= Palos Township, Illinois =

Palos Township
- Township
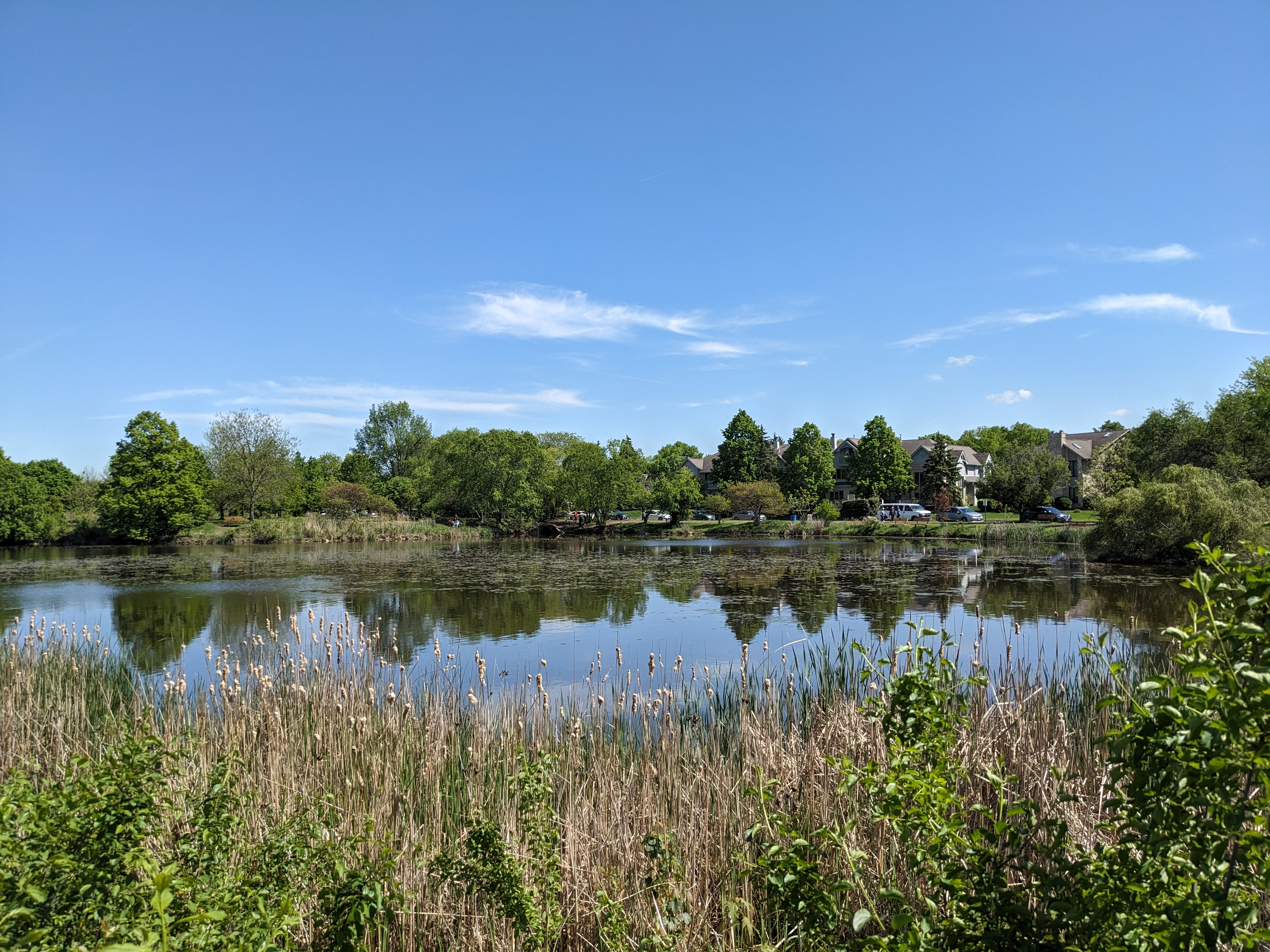
- Lake Katherine, Palos Heights

- Seal

- Location in Cook County

- Cook County's location in Illinois
- Coordinates: 41°41′05″N 87°51′11″W
- Country: United States
- State: Illinois
- County: Cook

Area
  - Total: 35.39 sq mi (91.7 km^{2})
  - Land: 33.74 sq mi (87.4 km^{2})
  - Water: 1.65 sq mi (4.3 km^{2}) 4.66%
- Elevation: 590 ft (180 m)

Population (2020)
  - Total: 56,836
  - Density: 1,685/sq mi (650.4/km^{2})
- Time zone: UTC-6 (CST)
  - Summer (DST): UTC-5 (CDT)
- ZIP codes: 60457, 60462, 60463, 60464, 60465, 60480, 60482
- FIPS code: 17-031-57355
- Website: www.palostownship.org

Palos Township is one of 29 townships in Cook County, Illinois. As of the 2020 census, its population was 56,836, with its most populous municipality being Palos Hills (pop. 17,484). The vast majority of the township's population resides in its eastern half; the half west of La Grange Road consists of the Palos Forest Preserves, a section of the Cook County Forest Preserves. In 1850 the small town of Trenton, Illinois changed its name to Palos; this recommendation was made by M. S. Powell, the local postmaster, whose ancestor supposedly sailed with Christopher Columbus from Palos de la Frontera. When it incorporated as a village in 1914, Palos officially became Palos Park. Nearby communities incorporated later: Hickory Hills, in 1951, and Palos Hills, in 1958. All three municipalities lie completely or substantially within Palos Township. Palos Heights, partially in Worth Township, incorporated in 1959.

Township offices are located at 10802 S. Roberts Road in Palos Hills. The municipalities of Worth and Bridgeview also lie partially in the township. Palos Township's approximate borders are Harlem Avenue (Illinois Route 43) on the east, 135th Street on the south, Will-Cook Road extended to the DuPage County line on the west, and 87th Street on the north; in the northwest, the township border follows the Des Plaines River from 87th Street to DuPage County's southeast corner. The Chicago Sanitary and Ship Canal, designated a National Historic District in 2011, passes through the township just south of the river, and the Cal-Sag Channel roughly bisects the township from east to west.

== Township services ==
According to Illinois law, townships are responsible for the maintenance of township roadways, the governance of the General Assistance program and the assessment of real property. In Cook County, townships are not responsible for assessing real property as the Cook County Assessor performs that function.

Some townships have adopted other duties, including the provision of health services. Palos Township runs a health service providing low- or no-cost physical examinations, sick visits, cholesterol tests and screenings, pregnancy tests, blood pressure screening, immunizations, podiatry services for senior citizens and other services.

Other services provided by Palos Township include free tax preparation for senior citizens, temporary handicapped placards, voter services, speaker's bureau, and much more.

== Geography ==
According to the 2021 census gazetteer files, Palos Township has a total area of 35.39 square miles (91.66 km^{2}), of which 33.74 square miles (87.39 km^{2}) (or 95.34%) is land and 1.65 square miles (4.27 km^{2}) (or 4.66%) is water.

=== Borders ===
Palos Township is bordered on the north by Lyons Township, on the east by Worth Township, on the south by Orland Township, and on the west by Lemont Township. The northwest border with Lyons Township follows the Des Plaines River, directly adjacent to the Chicago Sanitary and Ship Canal (managed by the Metropolitan Water Reclamation District of Greater Chicago) which connects Lake Michigan with the Mississippi River.

Other bordering township include Homer Township (Will County) on the southwest corner; Bremen Township (Cook County) on the southeast corner; Stickney Township (Cook County) on the northeast corner and Downers Grove Township (DuPage County) on the northwest corner.

=== Cities, towns, villages ===
- Bridgeview (the quarter southwest of 87th Street and Harlem Avenue)
- Hickory Hills (all but the small portion north of 87th Street)
- Orland Park (the small area north of 135th Street)
- Palos Heights (the half west of Harlem)
- Palos Hills
- Palos Park (all but a small area west of Will-Cook Road)
- Willow Springs (the largely non-residential portion south of 87th Street and east of the Des Plaines River, and east of the DuPage County line)
- Worth (the third west of Harlem)

=== Unincorporated Towns ===
- Southmoor at 41.652534°N 87.829773°W

=== Adjacent townships ===
- Lyons Township (north)
- Stickney Township (northeast)
- Worth Township (east)
- Bremen Township (southeast)
- Orland Township (south)
- Homer Township, Will County (southwest)
- Lemont Township (west)
- Downers Grove Township, DuPage County (northwest)

=== Cemeteries ===
The township contains three cemeteries: Fairmount-Willow Hills, Oak Hill and Sacred Heart Catholic.

=== Major highways ===
- Interstate 294
- U.S. Route 12
- U.S. Route 20
- U.S. Route 45
- Illinois Route 7
- Illinois Route 43
- Illinois Route 83
- Illinois Route 171

=== Airports and landing strips ===
- Palos Community Hospital Heliport

=== Lakes ===
- Bullfrog Lake
- Hambone Lake
- Horsetail Lake
- Lake Katherine
- Maple Lake
- Papoose Lake
- Tampier Lake
- Tuma Lake

=== Landmarks ===
- Orland Grove Forest Preserve
- Palos Sag-Valley Forest Preserve

These Cook County Forest Preserves woods:

- Burr Oak Woods (west quarter)
- Cherry Hill Woods
- Crooked Creek Woods
- Forty Acres Woods
- Groundhog Slough Woods
- Henry De Tonty
- Hickory Hills Woods
- Hidden Pond Woods
- Mcclaughry Springs Woods
- Mcmahon Woods
- Paddock Woods
- Palos Park Woods
- Paw Paw Woods
- Pioneer Woods
- Pulaski Woods
- Saganashkee Slough Woods
- Spears Woods
- Swallow Cliff Woods
- Tampier Slough Woods (east half)
- White Oak Woods
- Willow Springs Woods
- Wolf Road Woods

== Demographics ==
As of the 2020 census there were 56,836 people, 21,168 households, and 13,852 families residing in the township. The population density was 1,605.85 inhabitants per square mile (620.02/km^{2}). There were 23,107 housing units at an average density of 652.87 per square mile (252.07/km^{2}). The racial makeup of the township was 81.74% White, 3.49% African American, 0.26% Native American, 2.97% Asian, 0.02% Pacific Islander, 4.18% from other races, and 7.34% from two or more races. Hispanic or Latino of any race were 11.27% of the population.

There were 21,168 households, out of which 26.00% had children under the age of 18 living with them, 52.04% were married couples living together, 8.71% had a female householder with no spouse present, and 34.56% were non-families. 29.50% of all households were made up of individuals, and 15.60% had someone living alone who was 65 years of age or older. The average household size was 2.51 and the average family size was 3.17.

The township's age distribution consisted of 20.9% under the age of 18, 7.0% from 18 to 24, 23.6% from 25 to 44, 26.8% from 45 to 64, and 21.7% who were 65 years of age or older. The median age was 44.1 years. For every 100 females, there were 95.1 males. For every 100 females age 18 and over, there were 92.2 males.

The median income for a household in the township was $72,067, and the median income for a family was $90,042. Males had a median income of $56,924 versus $38,459 for females. The per capita income for the township was $38,372. About 7.0% of families and 9.6% of the population were below the poverty line, including 12.8% of those under age 18 and 8.5% of those age 65 or over.

Historical population
Census	Pop.	Note	%±
1930	1,436		—
1940	1,907		32.8%
1950	5,707		199.3%
1960	17,728		210.6%
1970	33,100		86.7%
1980	46,412		40.2%
1990	50,916		9.7%
2000	53,419		4.9%
2010	54,615		2.2%
2020	56,836		4.1%
U.S. Decennial Census

== Governance ==
Palos Township is governed by a township board of trustees sometimes called the township board or town board. The town board consists of five voting members and includes the elected township supervisor and four elected township trustees.

The town board is responsible for providing a budget and taxes sufficient to run the operations of the township government each year. The supervisor is a voting member of the town board but is also the chief executive officer and the chief financial officer of the township.

The township clerk, assessor and highway commissioner are elected officials; however, they do not have a vote on the town board.

Duties and powers of the supervisor

The township supervisor is the chief executive officer of the township and is responsible for the day-to-day operations of the township along with the following other duties:

- Chairing all meetings of the township board;
- Serving as township treasurer;
- Serving as supervisor of General Assistance;
- Serving as supervisor of buildings and grounds.

Current township elected officials
Name	Elected position	Party affiliation & village
Colleen Grant-Schumann	Supervisor	Republican - Palos Heights
Jane Nolan	Clerk	Democrat - Palos Hills
Robert E. Maloney	Assessor	Democrat - Palos Hills
Gene Adams	Highway Commissioner	Republican - Palos Park
Brent Woods	Trustee and Supervisor Pro-Tem	Republican - Worth
Richard C. Riley	Trustee	Republican - Palos Hills
Tasneem Abuzir	Trustee	Independent - Bridgeview
Pam Jeanes	Trustee	Republican - Orland Park

== Education ==
- Moraine Valley Community College
- Amos Alonzo Stagg High School – Consolidated High School District 230
- Carl Sandburg High School – Consolidated High School District 230
- Conrady Junior High School – North Palos School District 117
- Glen Oaks Elementary School – North Palos School District 117
- Oak Ridge Elementary School – North Palos School District 117
- Dorn Elementary School – North Palos School District 117
- Sorrick Elementary School – North Palos School District 117
- Palos East Elementary School – Palos School District 118
- Palos West Elementary School – Palos School District 118
- Palos South Elementary School – Palos School District 118
- Worthwoods Elementary School – Worth School District 127

== Political districts ==
- Illinois's 6th congressional district – Congressman Sean Casten (D-Downers Grove)
- State Senate District 16 – Senator Willie Preston (D-Chicago)
- State Senate District 18 – Senator William Cunnigham (D-Chicago)
- State Senate District 41 – Senator John F. Curran (R-Lemont)
- State House District 31 – Representative Mary E. Flowers (D-Chicago)
- State House District 32 – Representative Cyril Nichols (D-Chicago)
- State House District 35 – Representative Fran Hurley (D-Chicago)
- State House District 36 – Representative Kelly Burke (D-Evergreen Park)
- State House District 82 – Representative John Egofske (R-Lemont)
- Cook County Board District 6 – Commissioner Donna Miller (D-Lynwood)
- Cook County Board District 17 – Commissioner Sean M. Morrison (R-Palos Park)
- Cook County Board of (Tax) Review District 1 – Commissioner George Cardenas (D-Chicago)
- Cook County Board of (Tax) Review District 3 – Commissioner Larry Rodgers (D-Chicago)
- 4th Judicial Sub-Circuit
- 15th Judicial Sub-Circuit

== Voting history ==
Palos Township has been a generally Republican jurisdiction in presidential elections, having voted for ten of the last eleven Republican presidential candidates.

Palos township vote by party in presidential elections
Year	Democratic	Republican	Third Parties
2024	42.33% 9,992	56.35% 13,303	1.32% 312
2020	46.95% 12,577	51.44% 13,779	1.61% 432
2016	45.46% 11,021	48.68% 11,802	5.86% 1,422
2012	46.47% 10,476	51.88% 11,697	1.65% 372
2008	50.30% 12,004	48.44% 11,560	1.27% 302
2004	47.06% 11,251	52.28% 12,500	0.66% 158
2000	44.15% 9,701	52.52% 11,540	3.32% 730
1996	42.15% 8,862	48.45% 10,187	9.40% 1,975
1992	32.51% 8,083	46.04% 11,448	21.45% 5,335
1988	32.02% 7,189	67.98% 15,266	0.00% 0
1984	25.88% 5,301	74.12% 15,179	0.00% 0
