= 95th Street (Chicago) =

East–west highway in Chicago, Illinois, US

- 9500 South
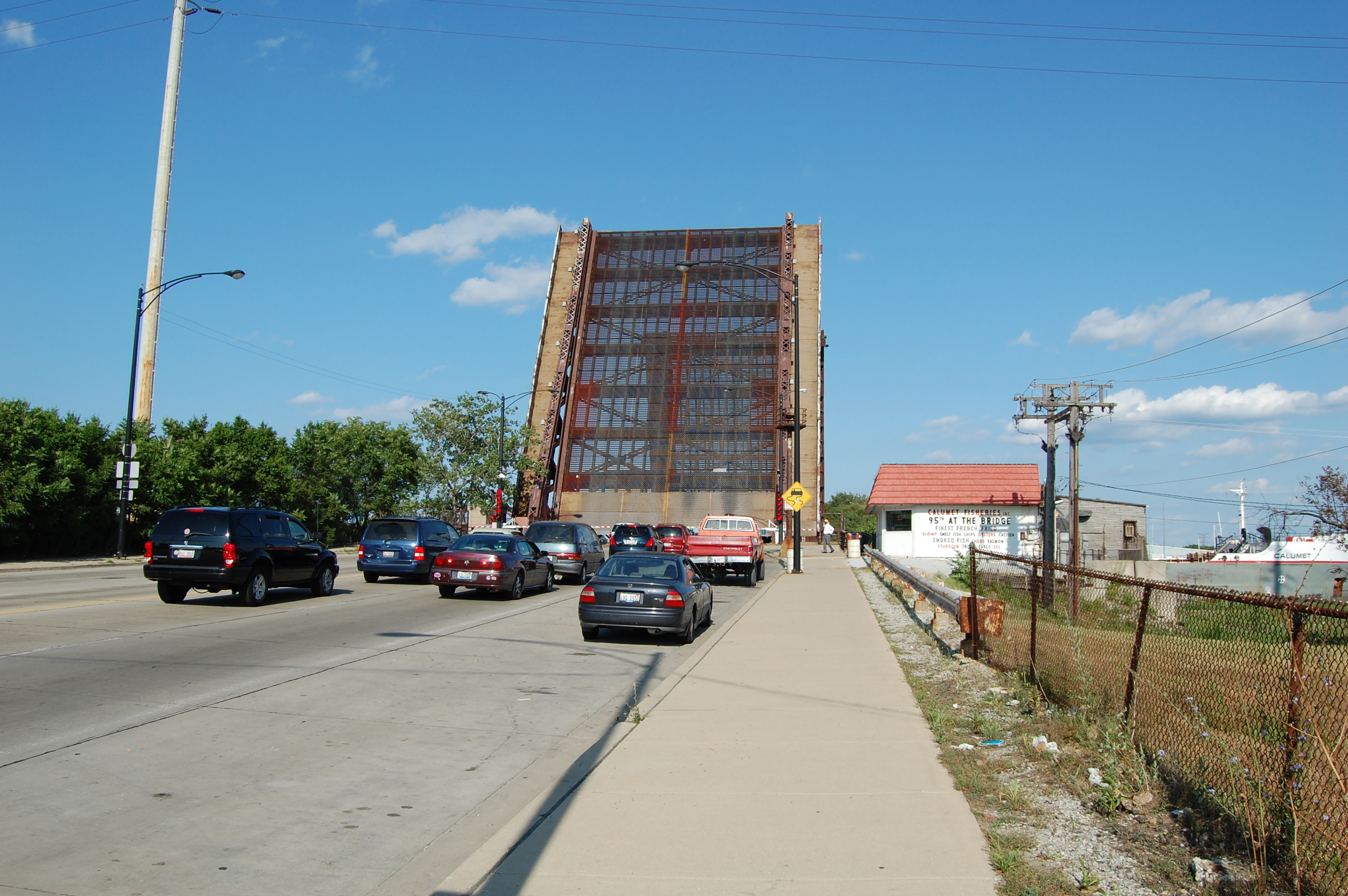
- 95th Street Bridge at the Calumet River
- Interactive map of 95th Street
- Part of: US 12 / US 20 / CR 89
- Length: 18.88 mi (30.38 km)
- Location: Chicago
- West end: Wolf's Crossing Road in Naperville
- East end: US 12 / US 20 / US 41 S. Ewing Avenue/Avenue L (3600 E) in Chicago

95th Street is a major east–west highway on Chicago's South Side, and in the southwest suburbs, is designated as 9500 South in Chicago's address system. 95th Street is 11 miles (18 km) south of Madison Street.

== Route description ==
95th Street begins at Wolf's Crossing Road in Naperville and continues east, becoming Will County Highway 89 from Plainfield-Naperville Road, curving southeast upon entering Bolingbrook, ending the county highway at DuPage River bridge. Its eastern terminus of western section of 95th Street is at Boughton Road, continuing as Kings Road.

The street resumes in Cook County at IL 171 (Archer Avenue) in Willow Springs, east of the Des Plaines River, in Palos Township. From there it runs through Spears Woods, part of the Palos Forest Preserves. Before exiting the preserves, it intersects La Grange Road (US 12/US 20/US 45). US 12 and 20 turn onto 95th Street, making it a much bigger road. Route 45 continues south on La Grange Road. Continuing east, 95th Street crosses major interstate and state routes, including: Interstate 294 (Tri-State Tollway, Harlem Avenue (Illinois Route 43), Cicero Avenue (Illinois Route 50), Pulaski Road, Kedzie Avenue, Halsted Street (Illinois Route 1). At State Street, 95th crosses Interstate 94 (the Dan Ryan Expressway). It is just south of 95th that Interstate 57 ends at I-94. Continuing east, 95th Street crosses Interstate 90 (Chicago Skyway), the Calumet River, before ending at Ewing Avenue/Avenue L (US 41) on Lake Michigan.

== Communities and sites ==
In the city of Chicago, 95th Street passes through the neighborhoods of Beverly, Washington Heights and Roseland, then marks the borders between Burnside and Pullman and between Calumet Heights and South Deering before crossing the Calumet River to enter the East Side neighborhood. Chicago State University is located on 95th Street between Cottage Grove and King Drive.

== Transportation ==
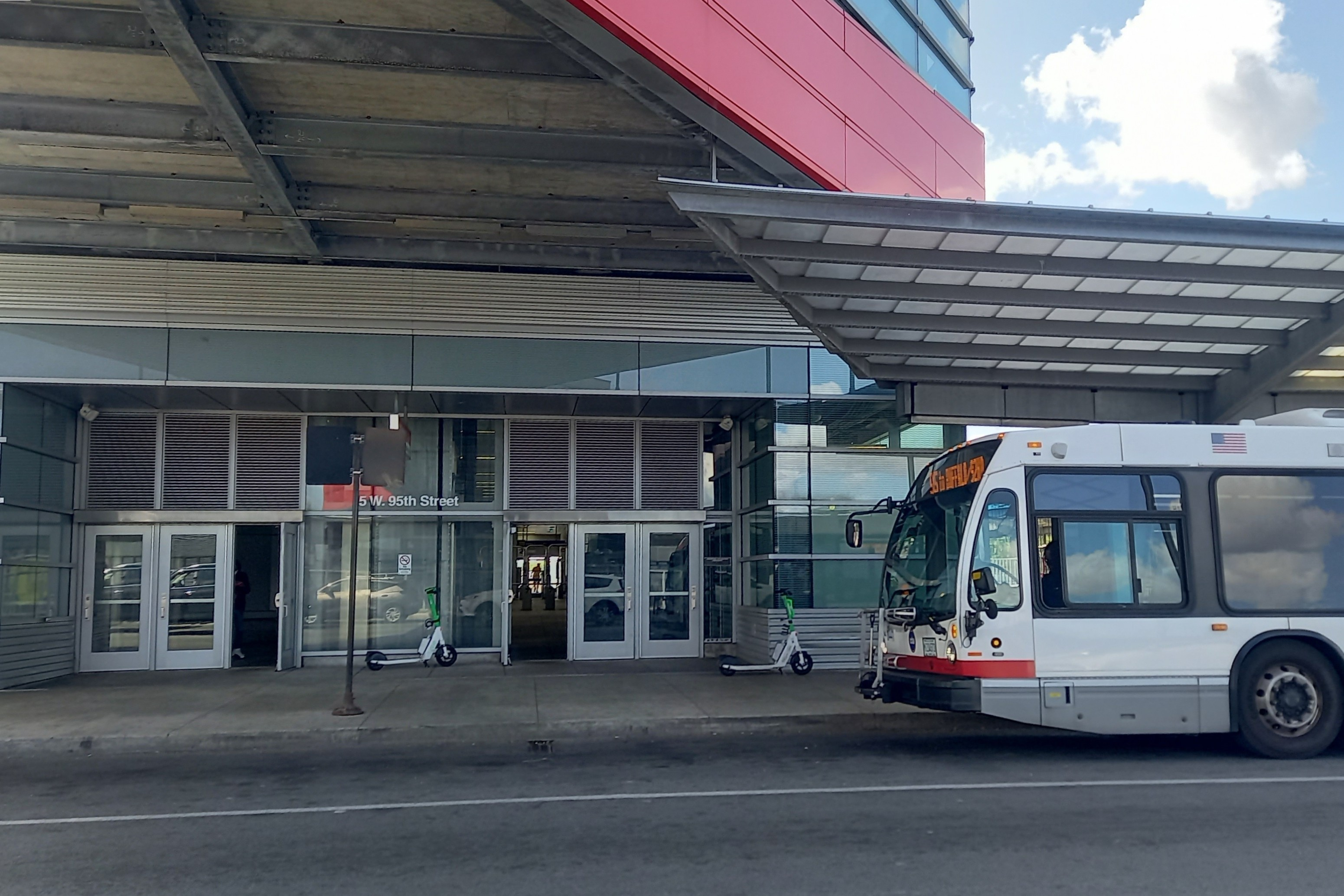
CTA route 95 bus stopping at 95th/Dan Ryan station

Taking into account its entire length, 95th Street is the longest east–west road on Chicago's South Side, and is served by a number of trains and buses (75th Street is longer as a whole, but has its majority in DuPage County rather than Chicago and Cook County.) The 95th/Dan Ryan terminal of the Red Line is one of the busiest in the system. It is a transfer point for people living on the far south side or in the suburbs. The CTA 95 95th and Pace 381 buses run along 95th Street. Additionally, the 29 State, 34 South Michigan, 100 Jeffery Manor Express, 103 West 103rd, 106 East 103rd, 108 Halsted/95th, 111 111th/King Drive, 112 Vincennes/111th, 115 Pullman/115th, and 119 Michigan/119th buses, as well as the Pace 352 Halsted, 353 95th/Dan Ryan CTA/Calumet City/Homewood, 359 Robbins/South Kedzie Avenue, and 395 95th/Dan Ryan CTA/UPS Hodgkins buses, start and end at 95th/Dan Ryan station. A number of Metra lines cross 95th Street, including: two stops on the Rock Island District line at 95th Street–Longwood and 95th Street–Beverly Hills, the Electric Main and Blue Island branches at 95th Street/CSU, and the SouthWest Service at Oak Lawn. The South Shore Line also crosses 95th Street at the Metra Electric station but does not stop there.

== In popular culture ==
The 95th Street bridge over the Calumet River is the one used for the "Draw Bridge Jump" scene in Blues Brothers at the beginning of the film.

== Major intersections ==
County	Location	mi	km	Destinations	Notes
Will	Naperville	0.0	0.0	Wolf's Crossing Road	Western terminus
Will	Naperville	1.2	1.9	IL 59	
Will	Naperville	3.2	5.1	CR 89 begins / CR 14 (Plainfield-Naperville Road)	
Will	Bolingbrook	4.4	7.1	CR 89 ends	County road ends at DuPage River bridge
Will	Bolingbrook	4.8	7.7	Boughton Road	Western section continues as Kings Road
Gap in route
Cook	Willow Springs	4.8	7.7	IL 171 (Archer Avenue)	
Cook	Palos Township	7.3	11.7	US 12 west / US 20 west / US 45 (La Grange Road)	Western end of US 12/US 20 concurrency
Cook	Hickory Hills–Palos Hills line	8.1	13.0	CR W30 (88th Avenue)	
Cook	Hickory Hills	9.1	14.6	CR W32 (Roberts Road)	
Cook	Hickory Hills–Bridgeview line	9.7	15.6	I-294 Toll (Tri-State Tollway) – Indiana, Wisconsin	
Cook	Bridgeview–Oak Lawn– Chicago Ridge tripoint	10.1	16.3	IL 43 (Harlem Avenue)	
Cook	Oak Lawn–Chicago Ridge line	11.1	17.9	CR W37 (Ridgeland Avenue)	
Cook	Oak Lawn	12.1	19.5	CR W39 (Central Avenue)	
Cook	Oak Lawn	13.1	21.1	IL 50 (Cicero Avenue)	
Cook	Chicago	17.1	27.5	CR W48 north (Ashland Avenue)	
Cook	Chicago	18.1	29.1	South Halsted Street to IL 1 / I-57 / I-94 east	
Cook	Chicago	19.1	30.7	I-94 west (Dan Ryan Expressway)	
Cook	Chicago	19.6	31.5	CR W55 (Dr. Martin Luther King Drive)	
Cook	Chicago	20.2	32.5	CR W57 south (Cottage Grove Avenue)	
Cook	Chicago	21.1	34.0	South Stony Island Avenue to I-94	
Cook	Chicago	23.6	38.0	US 12 east / US 20 east / US 41 / LMCT (South Ewing Avenue)	Eastern terminus; eastern end of US 12/US 20 concurrency
Cook	1.000 mi = 1.609 km; 1.000 km = 0.621 mi: Concurrency terminus; Incomplete access; Tolled				
