= Amos Alonzo Stagg High School =

Location
- 8015 W. 111th Street; Palos Hills, Illinois 60465; United States; 41.6877°N 87.8186°W

Information
- School type: Public Secondary
- Opened: 1964
- School district: Consolidated H.S. 230
- Superintendent: Dr. Robert Nolting
- CEEB code: 143357
- Principal: Mr. Eric Olsen
- Faculty: 207
- Teaching staff: 173.98 (FTE)
- Grades: 9–12
- Gender: Coed
- Enrollment: 2,583 (2023-2024)
  - Grade 9: 654 students
  - Grade 10: 627 students
  - Grade 11: 622 students
  - Grade 12: 635 students
- Average class size: 23
- Student to teacher ratio: 14.85
- Area: Southwest Suburbs
- Campus type: Suburban
- Colors: Navy Blue; Burnt Orange
- Slogan: Driving Excellence
- Athletics conference: Southwest Suburban Conference
- Mascot: Charger
- Team name: Chargers
- Accreditation: Illinois State Board of Education
- Newspaper: Staggline
- Yearbook: Kaleidoscope
- Communities served: Palos Hills, Palos Park, Hickory Hills, Worth, Bridgeview, Willow Springs and Orland Park
- Radio: WSHS 88.9 FM
- Website: http://stagg.d230.org/

Amos Alonzo Stagg High School, Stagg, or AAS, is a public four-year high school located at the intersection of S. Roberts Rd. and W. 111th Street in Palos Hills, Illinois, a southwest suburb of Chicago, Illinois, in the United States. It is part of Consolidated High School District 230, which also includes Victor J. Andrew High School and Carl Sandburg High School.

It serves several areas: sections of Palos Hills, Palos Park, Bridgeview, Hickory Hills, Orland Park, Palos Heights, Willow Springs, and Worth. There is an area including a portion of Orland Park and a part of Palos Park which is zoned to Stagg but has Carl Sandburg High as an option.

== History ==
In the spring of 1962, voters in Consolidated High School district 230 approved a US$2.1 million bond issue to construct the district's second high school, which was projected to have an initial student population of 1,200.

The school district chose to name the school for former University of Chicago American football coach Amos Alonzo Stagg. Stagg was chosen "in recognition of his century of devotion to young men to help them understand the powers they possess". The original building contained 16 classrooms, a gymnasium capable of seating 1,600, a band and choir room, a cafeteria and small theater, 7 laboratories, and 3 industrial arts rooms.

The general design saw the school built as three separate buildings, connected by glass corridors.

Like its sister school, Carl Sandburg, Stagg High School was designed specifically to be expanded in future years. The fall 1966 enrollment saw the school reach its capacity, a few months after the first expansion plans were revealed, calling for a swimming pool and more room for art and industrial education, among other additions.

== Academics ==
In 2008, Stagg had an average composite ACT score of 21.6 and graduated 96.2% of its senior class. The average class size is 22.4. Stagg has made Adequate Yearly Progress on the Prairie State Achievement Examination, the test used in Illinois to fulfill the federal No Child Left Behind Act.

== Student life ==
=== Activities ===
The school sponsors over 70 clubs and activities for students, ranging from athletics and fine arts to leadership and special interest. Among the student groups which are local chapters of national organizations are: Key Club, National Honor Society, Relay for Life, and Operation Snowball.

The Individual events team finished second in the IHSA state championship tournament in 1986.

Stagg Fight Song
MIDI sequenced by Christian Ponte — 21 KB

The Amos Alonzo Stagg Marching Chargers are Stagg's largest competitive extracurricular activity. Following a two-week band camp program, the marching band enters a fall season of contests and often tri-weekly rehearsals for the duration of the season. They participate in roughly 4–6 marching competitions each year across the state of Illinois, including an exhibition performance at their home competition, the Stagg Marching Band Jamboree (annual since 1979). The Marching Chargers generally end their yearly seasons by participating in the Illinois State University Invitational Marching Band Championships or the University of Illinois Illini Marching Festival.

=== Athletics ===
Stagg competes in the Southwest Suburban Conference (SWSC) and is a member of the Illinois High School Association (IHSA), which governs most interscholastic high school sports and competitive activities in the state of Illinois. Teams are stylized as the Chargers.

The school sponsors interscholastic sports teams for young men and women in basketball, bowling, cross country, golf, gymnastics, soccer, swimming & diving, tennis, track & field, volleyball, and water polo. Young men may compete in baseball, football, and wrestling, while young women may compete in badminton, cheerleading, and softball. While not sponsored by the IHSA, the school also sponsors a competitive poms team.

The following teams have placed in the top four of their respective IHSA sponsored state championship tournament or meet:

- Cross Country (Boys): 2nd place (1989–90); 4th place (1988–89)
- Football: Semifinals (2002–03)
- Softball: 3rd Place (1996–97); 4th Place (1994–95)
- Volleyball (Girls): 3rd place (1996–97)
- Wrestling: Team State Champions (1983–84) Individual State Champions: Kevin Malarick (2009–2010) & Kevin Moylan (2011–2012)
- Co-ed Cheerleading 3rd Place IHSA State Finals (2015)

== Feeder districts ==
Feeder districts include:

- Willow Springs School District 108
- North Palos School District 117
- Palos School District 118
- Worth School District 127

== Notable alumni ==
- Tom Pukstys (1986), six-time U.S. national champion in javelin; competed at 1992 Barcelona Olympics and 1996 Atlanta Olympics.
- Marty Casey, Bob Kourelis, and Dino Kourelis, members of the alternative rock band the Lovehammers,
- Katie Eberling (2006), U.S. Olympic bobsledder.
- T. J. McFarland (2007), Major League Baseball pitcher for the Oakland Athletics.
- Matthew Haag (2010), former professional Call of Duty player; founder, co-owner and CEO of esports team 100 Thieves (100T)
- Max Strus (2014), National Basketball Association player for the Cleveland Cavaliers.
