= Consolidated High School District 230 =

School district in Orland Park, Illinois, USA

Address
- 15100 South 94th Avenue Orland Park, Illinois, 60462; United States

District information
- Type: Public
- Grades: 9–12
- Established: May 2, 1952
- NCES District ID: 1708400

Students and staff
- Students: 7,719 (2023–2024)

Other information
- Website: www.d230.org

Consolidated High School District 230 is a public high school district headquartered in Orland Park, Illinois in the Chicago metropolitan area. It has over 8,300 students in three high schools.

Communities served by the district include all or parts of: Orland Park, Bridgeview, Hickory Hills, Oak Forest, Orland Hills, Palos Heights, Palos Hills, Palos Park, Tinley Park, Willow Springs, and Worth.

== Schools ==
- Victor J. Andrew High School
- Carl Sandburg High School
- Amos Alonzo Stagg High School

Former schools:

- Benjamin Franklin High School - from 1993 to 1998, District 230 operated Benjamin Franklin High School, a small laboratory school enrolling approximately 150 students. Franklin was established to be a center for staff development, a catalyst for school restructuring, and an alternative to the traditional high school experience. Students from each of the district's comprehensive high schools volunteered to attend Franklin.
- Orland High School - from 1917 to 1954, Orland High School was the original District 230 high school. The school served high school students in Orland and Palos Township who were ineligible to attend Chicago high schools. The school was founded by Dorothy Emily Davis, who was a graduate of the University of Chicago, who had come to the Orland/Palos area to establish a high school. The school was established in 1917 with funding from a provision from the Community High School Law of 1917. The school began with 13 students and existed in one room of the Orland Park village hall. The school received accreditation in 1920. The next year, the school would grow to 28 students and move to the old bank building. For roughly the next thirty years the school would make use of make-shift facilities until the opening of Carl Sandburg High School.
- Willow Grove School - An alternative school, it was in an unincorporated area. It was on a property that had 36 acres (15 ha) of land.

== Feeder districts ==
They are:

- Kirby District 140
- North Palos School District 117
- Orland Elementary District 135
- Palos School District 118
- Tinley Park Community Consolidated School District 146
- Willow Springs School District 108
- Worth School District 127
