= Mannheim Road =

Major street in the near-western suburbs of Chicago

- La Grange Road
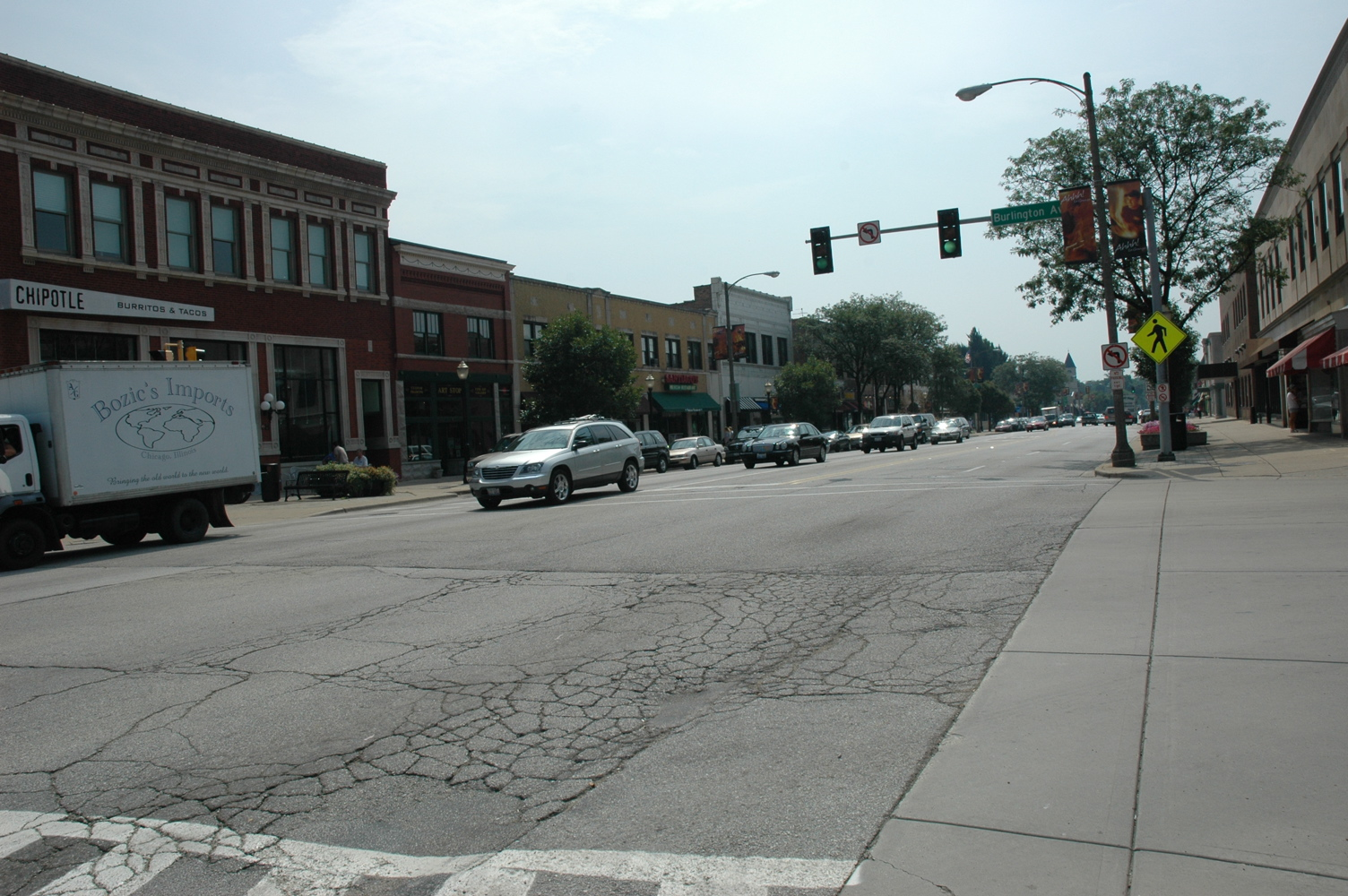
- La Grange Road as it passes through downtown La Grange
- Interactive map of Mannheim Road
- Part of: US 12 / US 20 / US 45
- South end: US 30 / US 45 in Frankfort
- North end: US 12 / US 45 (Lee Street) in Des Plaines

Mannheim Road, also known as La Grange Road from Cermak Road to U.S. Route 30 (US 30; Lincoln Highway), is a north–south major street in the near-western suburbs of Chicago. It carries US 12 from Des Plaines to 95th St near Hickory Hills, US 45 between Des Plaines on southwards past Frankfort, Illinois and carries US 20 between Lake Street in Stone Park, Illinois and 95th St. near Hickory Hills.

== History ==
The road is named after a former town called Mannheim that was founded by German farmers in what is now Franklin Park. From Cermak Road on the Westchester–La Grange Park border and points to the south, it is known as La Grange Road. On some small intersections on the part named La Grange Road, the street signs still call the road Mannheim or Manheim.

== Route description ==
Mannheim Road skirts along the eastern edge of O'Hare International Airport; numerous airport hotels and rental car services are located on the street near the airport. One major landmark of Mannheim Road is the Allstate Arena at the intersection of Mannheim Road and Lunt Avenue in Rosemont. Mannheim Road is known for its distinctive utility poles erected on the east side beginning at North Avenue. These poles are rectangular instead of cylindrical and have diagonal crossarms with street lights at the ends of some of them. Recently, as of 2026, most of the diagonal crossarms were replaced with standard horizontal crossarms by Commonwealth Edison.

There is a Metra station on the Milwaukee District West Line at Mannheim Road; in addition, Amtrak's Illinois Zephyr and Carl Sandburg and Metra's BNSF Line has a stop on La Grange Road in La Grange. Mannheim Road rises over a couple of freight railroad yards before skirting along the eastern edge of O'Hare Airport: Union Pacific's Proviso rail yard and CPKC's Bensenville railroad yard. At the northern descent of the latter, the road goes under the Tri-State Tollway. In Stone Park, US Route 20 branches off west on Lake Street.

There is also a school district on the left side of the street named Mannheim School District 83 on the intersection of Grand Avenue and Mannheim Road itself in Franklin Park. North Avenue also passes under Mannheim Road in Melrose Park.

In the southwest suburbs, the street (under the name LaGrange Road) acts as the main commercial street for the suburb of Orland Park, the area's major commercial center. The road continues as a major commercial arterial for Frankfort, where it veers southwest past Route 30 and continues south through Green Garden Township under various signage before picking up Route 52 south of Andres, in Peotone Township, from where it continues to its final termination at IL Route 102 in Bourbonnais.

== Major intersections ==
County	Location	mi	km	Destinations	Notes
Will	Frankfort	0.0	0.0	US 30 / US 45 south / Lincoln Highway	Southern terminus; south end of US 45 concurrency; road continues south
Will	Mokena	2.5	4.0	CR 84 east (191st Street)	
Will	Mokena	3.2	5.1	I-80 – Iowa, Indiana	I-80 exit 145
Cook	Orland Park	5.1	8.2	CR B60 east (171st Street)	
Cook	Orland Park	6.6	10.6	US 6 (159th Street)	
Cook	Orland Park	8.6	13.8	143rd Street to IL 7	
Cook	Palos Hills	12.2	19.6	IL 83 (Calumet Sag Road)	Interchange
Cook	Hickory Hills	14.7	23.7	US 12 east / US 20 east (95th Street)	South end of US 12/US 20 concurrency
Cook	Willow Springs	16.5	26.6	IL 171 to I-294 Toll south – Indiana, Joliet	Interchange; left exit southbound
Cook	Hodgkins	18.0	29.0	I-55 to I-294 Toll north – Wisconsin, Chicago, St. Louis	I-55 exit 279
Cook	Hodgkins	19.3	31.1	Historic US 66 (Joliet Road)	
Cook	La Grange	22.0	35.4	US 34 (Ogden Avenue)	
Cook	Westchester	25.2	40.6	IL 38 west (Roosevelt Road)	
Cook	Westchester	25.6	41.2	I-290 / IL 110 (CKC) – Chicago, Rockford	I-290 exit 17
Cook	Bellwood	26.5	42.6	IL 56 west (Washington Boulevard)	
Cook	Stone Park	27.5	44.3	US 20 west (Lake Street)	North end of US 20 concurrency
Cook	Stone Park	28.2	45.4	IL 64 (North Avenue)	Interchange
Cook	Schiller Park	31.7	51.0	IL 19 (Irving Park Road)	
Cook	Schiller Park	32.6	52.5	Balmoral Avenue	South end of expressway segment
Cook	Chicago	33.5	53.9	I-190 – Chicago, O'Hare	I-190 exits 2A-B
Cook	Chicago	34.4	55.4	Coffey Road	North end of expressway; no southbound exit
Cook	Rosemont	34.8	56.0	IL 72 to I-90 Toll east – Chicago, Rockford	
Cook	Des Plaines	36.6	58.9	US 12 west / US 45 north (Lee Street)	Northern terminus; north end of US 12/US 45 concurrency
1.000 mi = 1.609 km; 1.000 km = 0.621 mi: Concurrency terminus; Incomplete access
