= School District 108 =

School District 108 may refer to:

- Pekin Public Schools District 108
- Willow Springs School District 108
- Lake Park Community High School District 108
