= Max Strus =

American basketball player (born 1996)

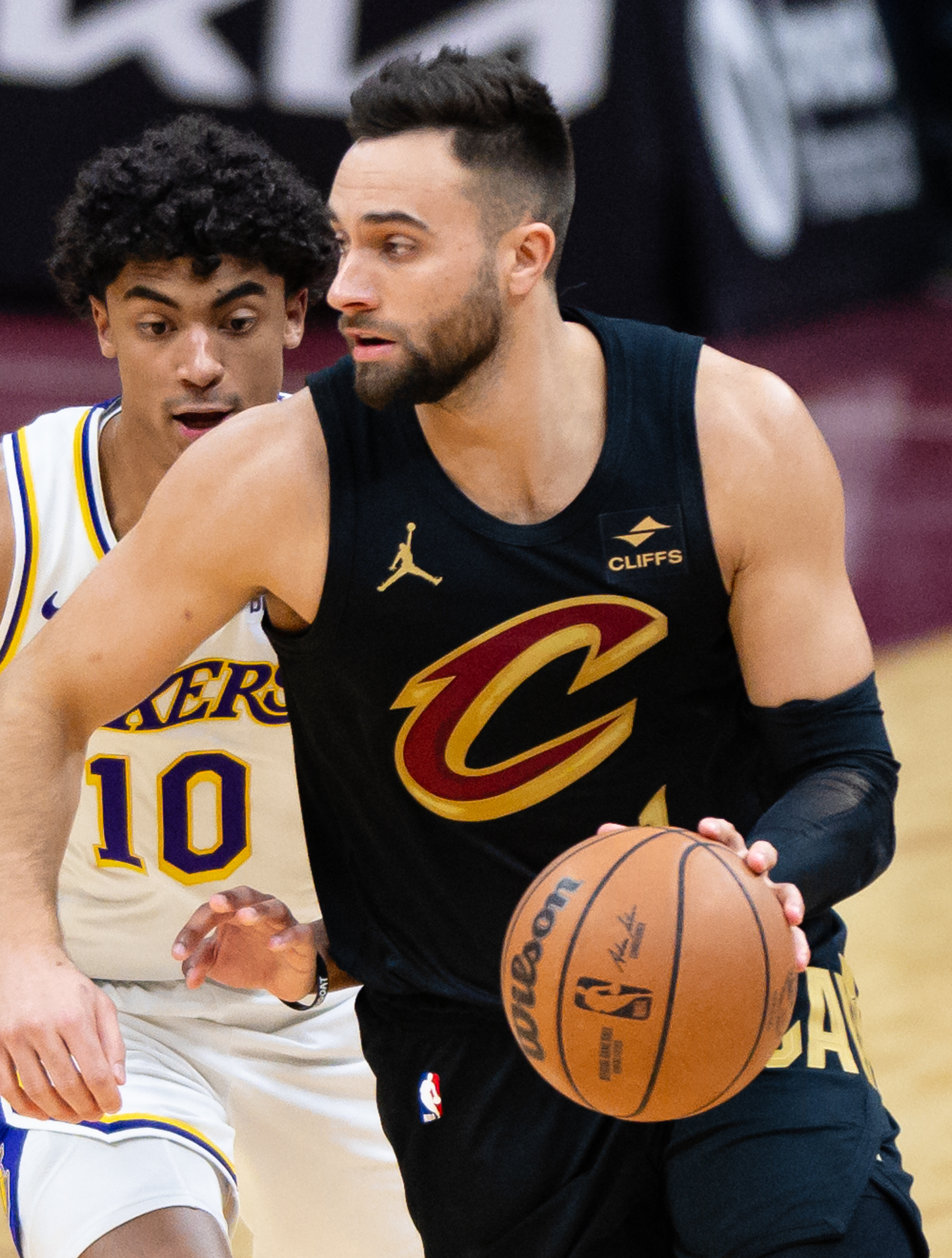
- Strus with the Cleveland Cavaliers in 2023

No. 31 – Los Angeles Clippers
- Position: Small forward / shooting guard
- League: NBA

Personal information
- Born: March 28, 1996 (age 30) Hickory Hills, Illinois, U.S.
- Listed height: 6 ft 5 in (1.96 m)
- Listed weight: 215 lb (98 kg)

Career information
- High school: Amos Alonzo Stagg (Palos Hills, Illinois)
- College: Lewis (2014–2016); DePaul (2017–2019)
- NBA draft: 2019: undrafted
- Playing career: 2019–present

Career history
- 2019–2020: Chicago Bulls
- 2019–2020: →Windy City Bulls
- 2020–2023: Miami Heat
- 2023–2026: Cleveland Cavaliers
- 2026–present: Los Angeles Clippers

Career highlights
- Second-team All-Big East (2019); First-team All-GLVC (2016); Second-team All-GLVC (2015)
- Stats at NBA.com
- Stats at Basketball Reference

Max Strus (/struːs/ STROOSS; born March 28, 1996) is an American professional basketball player for the Los Angeles Clippers of the National Basketball Association (NBA). He played college basketball for the Lewis Flyers and the DePaul Blue Demons. Prior to the Cavaliers, Strus played two games for the Chicago Bulls in his rookie season before signing with the Miami Heat, with whom he reached the NBA Finals in 2023.

== Early life ==
Strus was born in the Chicago suburb of Hickory Hills, Illinois, and is of Slovenian and German descent. He attended Amos Alonzo Stagg High School, where he was a member of the baseball and basketball teams. Although he entered his sophomore year at 5'9", he had a late growth spurt and was 6'5" by the end of high school. As a senior, Strus averaged 19 points and nine rebounds per game and was named the area player of the year by The Reporter, All-Southwest Suburban Conference, All-Area by the SouthtownStar and third team All-State. After having only received one Division I offer (Chicago State), Strus committed to play at Division II Lewis University, where his older brother Marty had played.

== College career ==
=== Lewis ===
Strus began his collegiate career at Lewis University. As a freshman, Strus averaged 13.3 points and 5.3 rebounds per game and started all 31 of the Flyers' games and was named second team All-Great Lakes Valley Conference (GLVC). As a sophomore, Strus averaged 20.2 points, 8.4 rebounds, and 3.5 assists per game-all team highs-and was named first team all-GLVC and an honorable mention Division II All-American. He also set school records with 167 free throws made and 666 points scored in a single season and points scored in a game with 52 (14 for 18 shooting) against Zach Allread and Northwood University on November 24, 2015. Following the season, Strus announced that he would be leaving the program in order to play at the Division I level. Strus scored 1,078 points in his two seasons at Lewis.

=== DePaul ===
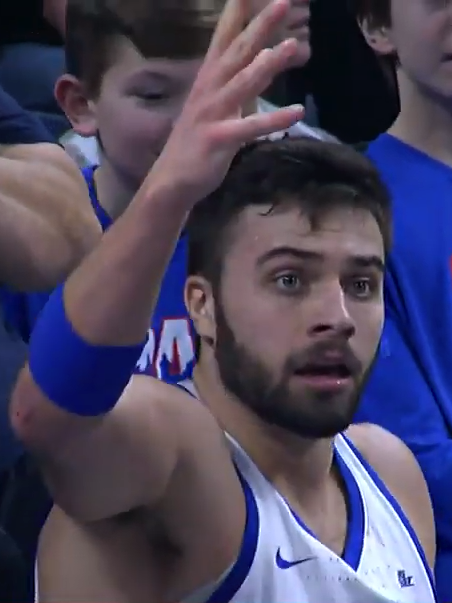
Strus with DePaul in 2018

Strus transferred to DePaul after his sophomore year. After sitting out one season due to NCAA transfer rules, Strus started throughout the season and led the team with 16.8 points per game, scoring in double figures in 26 of the 31 games he played in, and made 81 three-pointers, which was the second-most made in a season in program history. The team finished the season with an 11-20 record, 4-14 in Big East play. He declared for the 2018 NBA Draft, but returned to school for his final season.

In his final season, Strus averaged 20.1 points, 5.9 rebounds, 2.2 assists, and 0.9 steals per game and was named second team All-Big East Conference. The DePaul team finished 19-17, 7-11 in Big East play and accepted a bid to the College Basketball Invitational, where the team lost in the finals. He became only the second Blue Demons player ever to score 700 points in a season, after Mark Aguirre with 705 points, and set single season school records for three-point shots taken (311) and made (113). In two seasons at DePaul, Strus scored 1,226 points (29th in school history), 554 three-point attempts (second), and 194 three-pointers made (third) and finished with the fifth-highest free throw percentage at .825 (226-274).

== Professional career ==
=== Chicago Bulls (2019–2020) ===
After going undrafted in the 2019 NBA draft, Strus was named to the Boston Celtics Summer League roster. He averaged 9.8 points per game and shot 45 percent from three for the Celtics. On July 22, 2019, Strus signed a two-way contract with the team. On October 13, the Celtics announced that they had signed Strus to a standard NBA contract in order to sign Tacko Fall to one of the team's two two-way roster spots. The roster move put Strus in direct competition with Javonte Green for the final spot on the Celtics' Opening Day roster. He was ultimately cut shortly before the start of the regular season.

After being waived by the Celtics, Strus signed a two-way contract with his hometown Chicago Bulls on October 22, 2019. Strus made his NBA debut on November 22, against the Miami Heat, playing the final five minutes of a 116-108 loss and scoring five points with one rebound. On December 23, the Bulls announced that Strus had suffered a torn anterior cruciate ligament and bone bruise on his left knee in an NBA G League game for Windy City Bulls in a 92–85 win over the Lakeland Magic two days prior; he was subsequently ruled out for 8-to-12 months. Strus ended his rookie season with five points scored in two games played, also averaging 18.2 points, 5.8 rebounds, and 3.2 assists in 13 games with Windy City.

=== Miami Heat (2020–2023) ===
On November 30, 2020, Strus signed a training camp contract with the Miami Heat. The Heat converted his contract into a two-way contract on December 19, towards the end of training camp. On February 11, 2021, Strus came into a game against the Houston Rockets and scored 21 points on 5-of-8 three-point shooting. He made 39 total appearances for Miami during the 2021–22 NBA season, recording averages of 6.1 points, 1.1 rebounds, and 0.6 assists.

On August 1, 2021, Strus joined the Heat for the NBA Summer League and five days later, he signed a two-year contract worth $3.5 million to remain with the Heat. Strus played in 68 games (including 16 starts) for the Heat during the 2021–22 season, averaging 10.6 points, 3.0 rebounds, and 1.4 assists.

Strus made 80 appearances (including 33 starts) for Miami during the 2022–23 regular season, logging averages of 11.5 points, 3.2 rebounds, and 2.1 assists. On April 14, 2023, Strus scored 31 points against the Chicago Bulls after a loss against the Hawks in the play-in game. Short one point of his career high, he and Jimmy Butler combined for 62 points in a 102–91 win, sending the team to the 2023 playoffs. On May 6, Strus scored 19 points during a 105–86 Eastern Conference Semifinals Game 3 win against the New York Knicks. On June 1, Strus finished scoreless after going 0–of–10 in a Game 1 NBA Finals loss against the Denver Nuggets. He struggled in the Finals, where he averaged only 5.8 points a game on 23% shooting as the Heat lost the series in 5 games.

=== Cleveland Cavaliers (2023–2026) ===
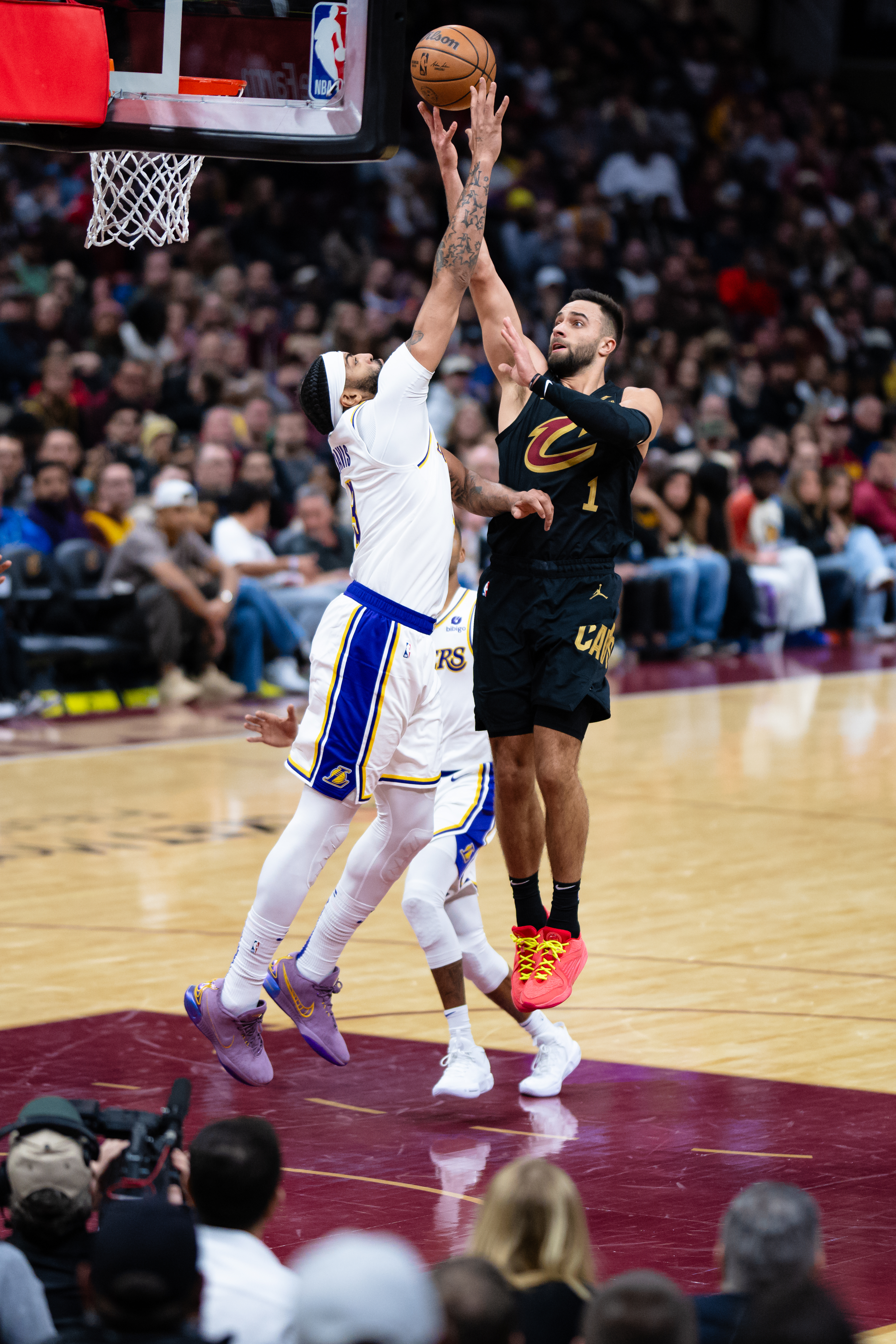
Strus with the Cavaliers in 2023

On July 6, 2023, Strus signed a four–year, $63 million contract with the Cleveland Cavaliers in a sign-and-trade agreement. On October 25, Strus made his Cavaliers debut, putting up 27 points with seven three-pointers made and 12 rebounds in a 114–113 win over the Brooklyn Nets. His seven three-pointers made were the most achieved by a player in a debut in Cavaliers history. On February 27, 2024, Strus scored 21 points in a 121–119 win against the Dallas Mavericks. In the span of 67 seconds late in the fourth quarter, Strus made five three-pointers including a buzzer-beating, game-winning shot from 59 feet. It was the second longest game-winning buzzer beater since 1979, and Strus became the fourth player in the last 25 years to connect on five three-pointers in the last four minutes of a game. Strus started 70 games for Cleveland during the 2023–24 NBA season, recording averages of 12.2 points, 4.8 rebounds, and 4.0 assists (all career–highs).

On October 19, 2024, the Cavaliers announced that Strus would miss the beginning of the season due to a right ankle sprain suffered in individual workouts during the preseason; he was held out for six weeks. Strus had already missed two preseason games from a right hip contusion. He made 50 appearances (37 starts) for the Cavaliers during the 2024–25 NBA season, averaging 9.4 points, 4.3 rebounds, and 3.2 assists.

On August 26, 2025, it was announced that Strus would miss 3-to-4 months after undergoing surgery to repair a Jones fracture in his left foot. On March 15, 2026, Strus made his return from injury, putting up 24 points, eight rebounds, and one assist in a 130–120 loss to the Dallas Mavericks.

=== Los Angeles Clippers (2026–present) ===
On August 20, 2026, Strus was traded to the Los Angeles Clippers in a five-team deal.

== Career statistics ==
Legend
GP	Games played	GS	Games started	MPG	Minutes per game
FG%	Field goal percentage	3P%	3-point field goal percentage	FT%	Free throw percentage
RPG	Rebounds per game	APG	Assists per game	SPG	Steals per game
BPG	Blocks per game	PPG	Points per game	**Bold**	Career high

=== NBA ===
==== Regular season ====
Year	Team	GP	GS	MPG	FG%	3P%	FT%	RPG	APG	SPG	BPG	PPG
2019–20	Chicago	2	0	3.1	**.667**	.000	**1.000**	.5	.0	.0	.0	2.5
2020–21	Miami	39	0	13.0	.455	.338	.667	1.1	.6	.3	.1	6.1
2021–22	Miami	68	16	23.3	.441	**.410**	.792	3.0	1.4	.4	.2	10.6
2022–23	Miami	**80**	33	28.4	.410	.350	.876	3.2	2.1	.5	.2	11.5
2023–24	Cleveland	70	**70**	**32.0**	.418	.351	.794	4.8	**4.0**	**.9**	**.4**	**12.2**
2024–25	Cleveland	50	37	25.5	.442	.386	.824	4.3	3.2	.5	.2	9.4
2025–26	Cleveland	12	5	24.0	.443	.402	.778	**5.4**	2.0	.3	.0	11.2
Career		321	161	25.5	.427	.370	.811	3.5	2.3	.5	.2	10.4

==== Playoffs ====
Year	Team	GP	GS	MPG	FG%	3P%	FT%	RPG	APG	SPG	BPG	PPG
2021	Miami	2	0	2.9	.000	—	—	.0	.0	.0	.0	.0
2022	Miami	18	18	29.0	.374	.331	.722	4.1	2.1	**.8**	**.4**	10.9
2023	Miami	**23**	**23**	28.1	.402	.319	.800	3.6	1.4	.3	.3	9.3
2024	Cleveland	12	12	**36.1**	.408	.347	**1.000**	5.3	2.9	**.8**	.0	9.5
2025	Cleveland	9	9	28.1	**.416**	**.388**	.833	**5.7**	**3.9**	.7	.2	**11.7**
2026	Cleveland	18	4	26.7	.406	.358	.917	4.8	2.1	**.8**	.2	9.6
Career		82	66	28.6	.397	.343	.833	4.4	2.2	.6	.3	9.8

=== College ===
==== NCAA Division I ====
Year	Team	GP	GS	MPG	FG%	3P%	FT%	RPG	APG	SPG	BPG	PPG
2017–18	DePaul	31	31	35.6	.408	.333	.803	5.7	**2.7**	**1.3**	**.5**	16.8
2018–19	DePaul	**35**	**35**	**37.4**	**.429**	**.363**	**.842**	**5.9**	2.2	.9	**.5**	**20.1**
Career		66	66	36.6	.420	.350	.825	5.8	2.5	1.1	.5	18.6

==== NCAA Division II ====
Year	Team	GP	GS	MPG	FG%	3P%	FT%	RPG	APG	SPG	BPG	PPG
2014–15	Lewis	31	31	28.8	**.521**	.352	.773	5.3	2.2	**1.5**	**.8**	13.3
2015–16	Lewis	**33**	**33**	**36.2**	.455	**.360**	**.823**	**8.4**	**3.5**	1.2	**.8**	**20.2**
Career		64	64	32.6	.479	.357	.807	6.9	2.9	1.4	.8	16.8

== Personal life ==
Strus's father, John, played college baseball as a pitcher for Eastern Illinois and his mother, Debra, played basketball and volleyball at DePaul and was inducted into the school's Athletic Hall of Fame in 2000. His older brother, Marty, also played basketball at Lewis and is currently the head coach at Stagg High School. He also has an older sister, Maggie, who played college volleyball at the University of Illinois at Chicago and is currently an assistant volleyball coach at DePaul.
