= Ben Skora =

American inventor (died 2018)

- Born: March 12, 1937
- Died: October 12, 2018 (aged 81)

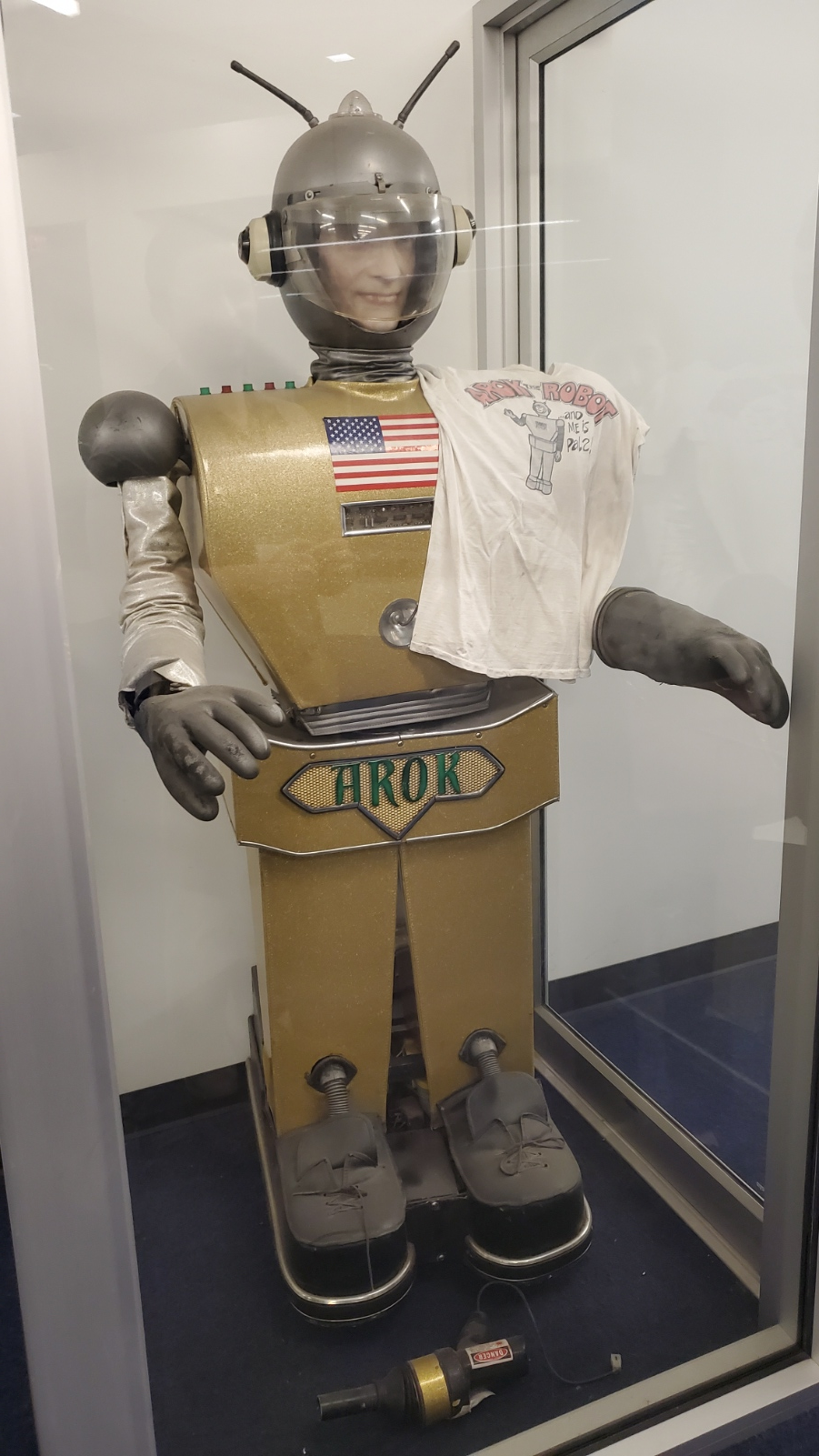
Arok at Moraine Valley Community College

Benjamin J. Skora was an American inventor residing in Palos Hills, Illinois, who specialized in robotics and home automation. He often worked with spare parts obtained from junk yards or discarded by others. He was best known for building Arok, a humanoid robot which was highly advanced for its time in the late 1970s. Arok was able to move in any direction at up to 3 mph, lift 125 pounds and bend 45 degrees at the waist. It was able to perform routine household tasks such as serving drinks, taking out the trash and walking the dog.

His home included many of his creations including a drivable motorized easy chair, an automatic retractable soap dispenser, dressers that slide away to reveal a hallway to another room, and a ski slope from the roof.

He appeared in the magazines People and Cosmopolitan, on the TV shows Real People and Ripley's Believe It or Not! and the Chris Smith film Home Movie (2001).

His home in Palos Hills was torn down on November 28, 2014.

On October 9, 2015, his cousin Tom Skora donated Arok (the name comes from Skora's last named spelled backward minus the S) to Moraine Valley Community College in Palos Hills.

== Health ==
In 2013 Skora, who had Alzheimer's disease, was moved into an assisted-care center in Hickory Hills, Illinois, by his family. His cousin Tom Skora had Ben's power of attorney. Skora died in October 2018.
