= Anne S. Zickus =

American businesswoman and politician (born 1939)

Anne S. Zickus (born April 6, 1939) is a former American businesswoman and politician. From Palos Hills, Illinois, Zickus worked in the real estate business. She served on the Palos Hills City Council and was involved with the Republican Party. Zickus served in the Illinois House of Representatives from 1989 to 1991 and from 1993 to 2003.
