= Katie Eberling =

American bobsledder (born 1988)

Personal information
- Born: August 7, 1988 (age 37)
- Education: Western Michigan University (BS)

Sport
- Country: United States
- Sport: Bobsleigh
Medal record
Women's Bobsleigh
Representing United States
World Championships
Silver medal – second place	2013 St. Moritz	Two-woman
Bronze medal – third place	2012 Lake Placid	Two-woman

Katie F. Eberling (born August 7, 1988) is an American retired bobsledder. She medaled at the 2012 and 2013 FIBT World Championships, and was an alternate on the United States team at the 2014 Winter Olympics in Sochi.

Raised in Palos Hills, Illinois, Eberling attended Amos Alonzo Stagg High School before playing four seasons of volleyball for the Western Michigan Broncos. She graduated from the university in April 2011 with a Bachelor of Science degree in early childhood education. In December 2010, Elana Meyers reached out to Eberling to recruit her for bobsled tryouts. In 2011, Eberling began training in the sport.

Eberling began her bobsled career as a brakeman. She was the 2011 United States bobsled push champion. At the FIBT World Championships 2012, she placed third in the two-woman bobsleigh with Elana Taylor as driver. In 2013, the same duo won a silver medal at the World Championships. That year, the U.S. Bobsled and Skeleton Federation named Eberling the women's bobsled athlete of the year.

In April 2013, Eberling, a lifelong Chicago Cubs fan, threw the ceremonial first pitch at a Cubs game.

In January 2014, the U.S. Bobsled and Skeleton Federation announced their picks for the Team USA delegation to the 2014 Winter Olympics; Eberling was not named. Track and field athlete Lolo Jones was chosen as the third-pick brakeman in place of Eberling, who was made an alternate. Selena Roberts, writing for USA Today, described Eberling's cut as a "snub" while other journalists called the decision a publicity stunt, arguing Eberling was more qualified than Jones. She traveled with the team to Sochi, Russia, and practiced as a backup athlete. Following the Olympics, because of the "subjective decision-making and the lack of control" she faced as a brakeman, Eberling switched to competing as a driver.

She announced her retirement from bobsledding in 2017 following an injury of two hamstring tears during a preseason camp. She was in contention for a place as a driver on the Olympic team to the 2018 Winter Olympics until her injury.
