= Palos Heights, Illinois =

- City
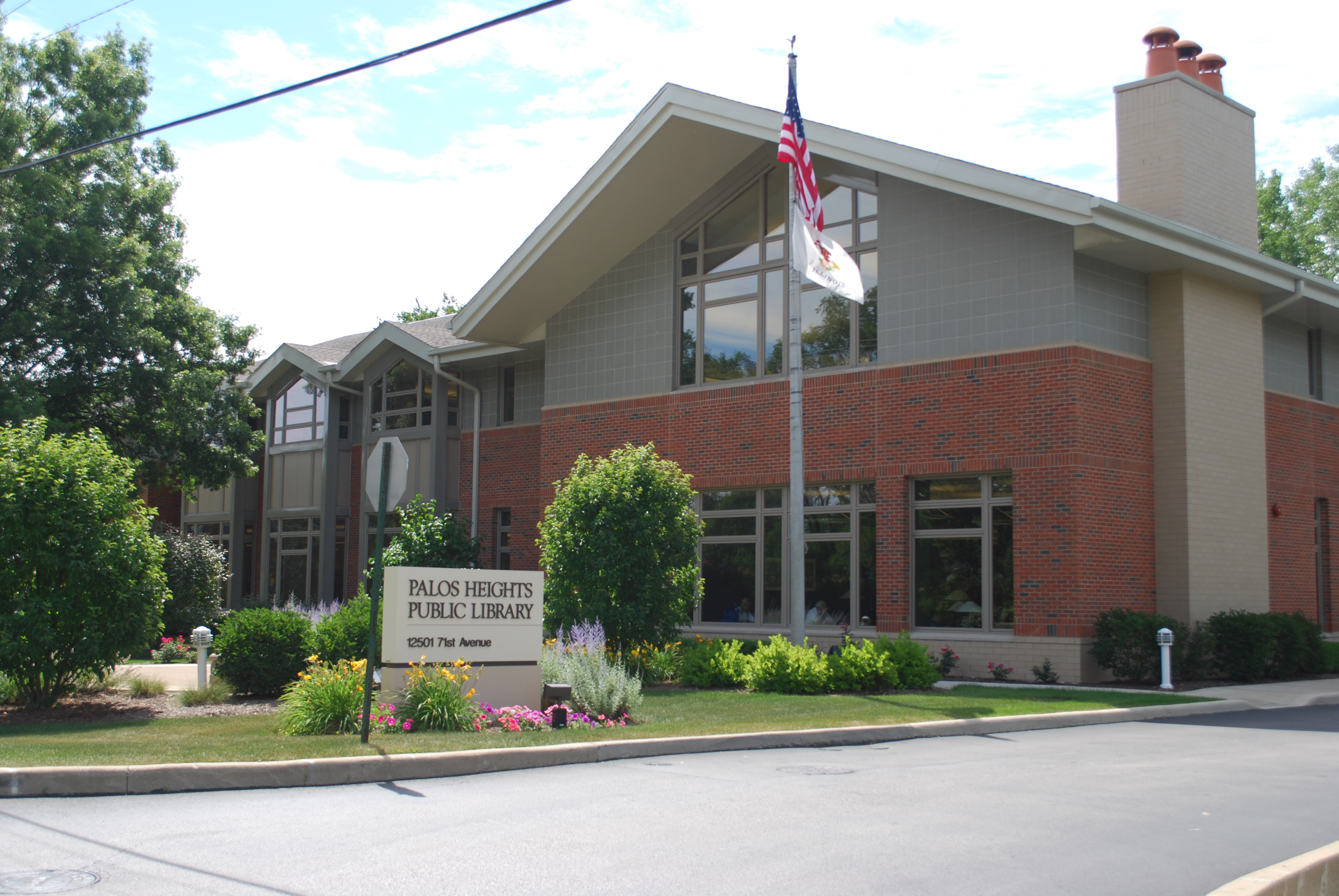
- Palos Heights Public Library

- Flag Seal

- Location of Palos Heights in Cook County, Illinois.

- Location within Greater Chicago Location within Illinois Location within the United States
- Coordinates: 41°39′55″N 87°47′50″W
- Country: United States
- State: Illinois
- County: Cook
- Township: Palos, Worth
- Incorporated: 1959

Government
  - Type: Mayor–council
  - Mayor: Robert Straz

Area
  - Total: 3.87 sq mi (10.03 km^{2})
  - Land: 3.77 sq mi (9.77 km^{2})
  - Water: 0.097 sq mi (0.25 km^{2}) 2.58%

Population (2020)
  - Total: 12,068
  - Density: 3,198.0/sq mi (1,234.77/km^{2})

Standard of living (2007-11)
  - Per capita income: $39,954
  - Median home value: $301,300
- ZIP code(s): 60463
- Area code(s): 708
- Geocode: 57381
- FIPS code: 17-57381
- Website: www.palosheights.org

Palos Heights is a city in Cook County, Illinois, United States. It is a southwest suburb of Chicago. Per the 2020 census, the population was 12,068.

== History ==
Palos Heights was incorporated on April 11, 1959, on its fourth attempt at the ballot with the results 850 to 684. It officially became a city on April 16, 1959. Shortly thereafter, Z. Erol Smith was elected its first mayor and was re-elected three times, serving until 1973. The city’s name derives from the surrounding Palos Township, which was renamed in 1850—on the recommendation of early postmaster Melanchan A. Powell—after Palos de la Frontera, Spain.

In 1965, a group of scholars met in Palos Heights to discuss the need for a contemporary translation of the Bible. The necessity of the project was agreed upon, and shortly thereafter, the New International Version (NIV) was initiated in Palos Heights.

Beginning in the late 1980s under Mayor Eugene Simpson, the city redeveloped land along the Cal-Sag Channel into what became Lake Katherine; a nonprofit nature center was formalized in 2005 to manage the site.

In 2000, plans by the Al Salam Mosque Foundation to purchase a former church building in Palos Heights drew regional and national attention after the city council voted to offer the group money to abandon the sale; Mayor Dean Koldenhoven vetoed the payout. The foundation sued the city, and in May 2005 a federal jury found Palos Heights did not violate the group’s civil rights. Koldenhoven received a 2002 John F. Kennedy Profile in Courage Award for his stance during the dispute.

In the aftermath of the September 11 attacks, Cook County prosecutors filed a hate-crime case after a 39-year-old man attacked a gas-station worker in Palos Heights; the defendant pleaded guilty to aggravated battery, unlawful use of a weapon, and a hate crime.

== Geography ==
According to the 2021 census gazetteer files, Palos Heights has a total area of 3.87 square miles (10.02 km^{2}), of which 3.77 square miles (9.76 km^{2}) (or 97.47%) is land and 0.10 square miles (0.26 km^{2}) (or 2.53%) is water.

=== Neighborhoods ===
Palos Heights has the following neighborhoods, each with distinct characteristics:

- Lake Katherine
- Colonial Heights/Old Palos
- Downtown
- Ishnala
- Laurel Glen
- Navajo Hills
- Oak Hills Country Club Village
- Old Westgate
- Palos Pines
- Westgate Valley

== Demographics ==
Historical population
Census	Pop.	Note	%±
1960	3,775		—
1970	8,544		126.3%
1980	11,096		29.9%
1990	11,478		3.4%
2000	11,260		−1.9%
2010	12,515		11.1%
2020	12,068		−3.6%
U.S. Decennial Census; 2010 2020

=== Racial and ethnic composition ===
Palos Heights city, Illinois – Racial and ethnic composition Note: the US Census treats Hispanic/Latino as an ethnic category. This table excludes Latinos from the racial categories and assigns them to a separate category. Hispanics/Latinos may be of any race.
Race / Ethnicity (NH = Non-Hispanic)	Pop 2000	Pop 2010	Pop 2020	% 2000	% 2010	% 2020
White alone (NH)	10,727	11,456	10,734	95.27%	91.54%	88.95%
Black or African American alone (NH)	47	208	196	0.42%	1.66%	1.62%
Native American or Alaska Native alone (NH)	9	6	4	0.08%	0.05%	0.03%
Asian alone (NH)	232	249	224	2.06%	1.99%	1.86%
Pacific Islander alone (NH)	0	1	0	0.00%	0.01%	0.00%
Other race alone (NH)	6	13	29	0.05%	0.10%	0.24%
Mixed race or Multiracial (NH)	78	108	235	0.69%	0.86%	1.95%
Hispanic or Latino (any race)	161	474	646	1.43%	3.79%	5.35%
Total	11,260	12,515	12,068	100.00%	100.00%	100.00%

=== 2020 census ===
As of the 2020 census, Palos Heights had a population of 12,068. The median age was 54.3 years. 17.7% of residents were under the age of 18 and 32.5% of residents were 65 years of age or older. For every 100 females there were 87.2 males, and for every 100 females age 18 and over there were 83.4 males age 18 and over.

100.0% of residents lived in urban areas, while 0.0% lived in rural areas.

There were 4,910 households in Palos Heights, of which 22.1% had children under the age of 18 living in them. Of all households, 58.8% were married-couple households, 11.2% were households with a male householder and no spouse or partner present, and 26.9% were households with a female householder and no spouse or partner present. About 27.4% of all households were made up of individuals and 18.9% had someone living alone who was 65 years of age or older.

There were 5,114 housing units, of which 4.0% were vacant. The homeowner vacancy rate was 1.6% and the rental vacancy rate was 4.6%.

=== 2000 census ===
As of the 2000 census, there were 11,561 people, 4,123 households, and 3,133 families residing in the city. The population density was 2,978.6 people per square mile (1,150.0 people/km^{2}). There were 4,268 housing units at an average density of 1,129.0 per square mile (435.9/km^{2}). The racial makeup of the city was 96.39% White, 0.44% African American, 0.09% Native American, 2.06% Asian, 0.25% from other races, and 0.78% from two or more races. Hispanic or Latino of any race were 1.43% of the population.

The top five ancestries reported in Palos as of the 2000 census were Irish (27.2%), German (20.5%), Polish (14.1%), Italian (10.5%) and Dutch (9.1%).

There were 4,123 households, out of which 25.0% had children under the age of 18 living with them, 67.0% were married couples living together, 6.6% had a female householder with no husband present, and 24.0% were non-families. 22.2% of all households were made up of individuals, and 14.2% had someone living alone who was 65 years of age or older. The average household size was 2.54 and the average family size was 2.98.

In the city, the population was spread out, with 20.2% under the age of 18, 8.2% from 18 to 24, 18.6% from 25 to 44, 27.5% from 45 to 64, and 25.5% who were 65 years of age or older. The median age was 47 years. For every 100 females, there were 86.2 males. For every 100 females age 18 and over, there were 81.8 males.

The median income for a household in the city was $69,907, and the median income for a family was $81,100. Males had a median income of $61,786 versus $37,188 for females. The per capita income for the city was $32,895. About 2.6% of families and 3.2% of the population were below the poverty line, including 4.0% of those under age 18 and 4.1% of those age 65 or over.

== Government ==
Palos Heights is divided between three congressional districts. Most of the city, including all the area in Worth Township, is in Illinois's 1st congressional district; most of the area in Palos Township, excepting some of the southern portions (generally south of 131st Street) are in the 3rd district; an area under 0.05 square miles (100,000 m^{2}) northeast of 131st Street and 80th Avenue, along with a small area around Palos Community Hospital, is in the 13th district. The City Council is made up of a mayor, city clerk, city treasurer and eight aldermen from wards.

== Education ==
=== Primary and secondary schools ===
Palos Heights is served by four school districts. The four districts are: Palos Heights School District 128, Palos Community Consolidated School District 118, Community High School District 218, and Consolidated High School District 230.

District 128 operates one pre-school (Indian Hill), two elementary schools (Chippewa and Navajo Heights), and a junior high school (Independence). District 118 also operates two elementary schools (Palos East and Palos West) and a middle school (Palos South). The district's Palos East elementary is situated within the city's boundaries.

Community High School District 218's Alan B. Shepard High School serves Palos Heights and several neighboring communities. Students can choose from more than 200 different courses, including advanced placement courses, foreign language, computer programming, computer-aided design, robotics, graphic design, and desktop publishing. In addition, students can participate in a full roster of sports.

Consolidated High School District 230's Amos Alonzo Stagg High School, located in Palos Hills, serves Palos Heights students living west of Harlem Avenue (Illinois Route 43). It also offers more than 200 courses designed to meet the academic needs of college-bound students and the training needs of career-oriented students.

Several private and parochial schools in Palos Heights offer alternatives to public school education. Among the schools are St. Alexander Catholic School, Palos Evangelical Lutheran Elementary School, Elim Christian School, Chicago Christian High School, and Stone Church Christian Academy. The latter offers the full range of college preparatory, business, and technology courses. Kennedy School is in nearby Palos Hills. The Roman Catholic Archdiocese of Chicago operates the Catholic schools. Incarnation Catholic School closed in 2018.

=== Colleges and universities ===
Palos Heights students can readily commute to Moraine Valley Community College in nearby Palos Hills. Moraine Valley serves the local residents through classes, seminars, lectures, concerts, plays, and other activities. Trinity Christian College is also located in Palos Heights.

=== Public library ===
Palos Heights Public Library serves the community.

== Transportation ==
Palos Heights has a station on Metra's SouthWest Service, which provides daily rail service between the village of Manhattan and Chicago Union Station. Palos Heights is served by three Pace bus routes.

== Notable people ==
- Brian Bogusevic, outfielder with Houston Astros and Chicago Cubs
- Peter Brown, singer-songwriter, co-wrote Madonna's "Material Girl", was raised in Palos Heights
- Kendall Coyne Schofield, ice hockey Olympic gold medallist and forward with the PWHPA
- David Dombrowski, president of baseball operations for the Philadelphia Phillies
- Brendan Houlihan, former member of the Cook County Board of Review
- Jim Hughes, pitcher with Brooklyn Dodgers, Chicago Cubs and Chicago White Sox
- Arlene Kotil, professional baseball player
- Jennifer Lien, actress (Star Trek: Voyager)
- Christine Magnuson, two-time Olympic swimming medalist
- Ryan Murphy, USA Olympic swimmer
- Ed Olczyk, member of USA hockey team at 1984 Olympics, NHL player, coach and broadcaster
- Tony Pashos, retired professional football player
- Quentin Richardson, forward and guard with the Miami Heat
- Herb Schumann, former Cook County commissioner
- Robin Tunney, actress (The Craft, The Mentalist)
- Paul Vallas, candidate in 2023 Chicago mayoral election, lists a home in Palos Heights as his primary residence.
