= Victor J. Andrew High School =

Location
- 9001 W. 171st Street; Tinley Park, Illinois 60487; United States; 41.5775°N 87.8391°W

Information
- School type: Public Secondary
- Motto: Innovation. Empathy. Leadership.
- Opened: 1977
- School district: Consolidated H.S. 230
- Superintendent: Robert Nolting
- CEEB code: 144117
- Principal: Abir Othman
- Faculty: 184
- Teaching staff: 142.90 (FTE)
- Grades: 9–12
- Gender: Coed
- Enrollment: 2,213 (2024-2025)
- Average class size: 21.4
- Student to teacher ratio: 15.49
- Campus type: Suburban
- Colors: Black; Gold
- Athletics conference: Southwest Suburban Conference
- Mascot: Thunderbolt
- Team name: Thunderbolts
- Accreditation: Illinois State Board of Education
- Publication: Illusions
- Newspaper: The Circuit
- Communities served: Tinley Park, Orland Park, Orland Hills and Oak Forest
- Website: andrew.d230.org

Victor J. Andrew High School, Andrew, or VJA, is a public four-year high school located in Tinley Park, Illinois, a southwest suburb of Chicago, Illinois, in the United States. It is named for Victor J. Andrew, of Andrew Corporation fame. It is the third school to become part of Consolidated High School District 230, which also includes Amos Alonzo Stagg High School and Carl Sandburg High School.

== Academics ==
In 2023, Andrew had an average math SAT score of 486.3, and an average ELA SAT score of 503.7. Andrew also had a graduation rate of 93.7% and in 2021, 80% of students enrolled in college within one year of graduation.

== Student life ==
=== Athletics ===
Andrew competes in the Southwest Suburban Conference (SWSC), and is a member of the Illinois High School Association (IHSA), which governs most sports and competitive activities in the state. The school's teams are nicknamed the Thunderbolts. The Thunderbolt name and logo was based on the "Flash" trademark of the Andrew Corporation.

The school sponsors interscholastic teams for young men and women in basketball, bowling, cross country, golf, gymnastics, soccer, swimming & diving, tennis, track & field, volleyball, and water polo. Young men may compete in baseball, football, and wrestling, while young women may compete in badminton, cheerleading, and softball.

The following teams have won or placed top four in their respective IHSA sponsored state championship tournament or meet:

- Badminton (Girls): State Champions (1982–83, 1993–94, 1999–00, 2000–01, 2001–02, 2004–05); 2nd Place (1992–93, 2002–03, 2006–07); 3rd Place (1988–89, 1991–92, 1998–99, 2003–04, 2005–06)
- Baseball: State Champions (1991–92); 2nd Place (1997–98); 3rd Place (1998–99, 2001–02)
- Bowling (Boys): State Champions (2004–05, 2005–06, 2011–12) 2nd Place (2013–14)
- Bowling (Girls): State Champions (2011–12)
- Volleyball (Girls): 2nd Place (1989–90)

=== Activities ===
==== Marching Band ====
Students decorate a window on the south end of the building during the 2007 Homecoming week.

The marching band is a nationally recognized field show marching band.

The first director of the Victor J. Andrew High School Marching band was Patrick Culler in 1977. During Culler's tenure, he wanted his band to strive for excellence and the current principal wanted the band to start competing. Thus, the band started competing in 1979. Later in 1982, Dan Romano inherited the band program including the marching band and all concert bands; he directed the program until 2010.

In the 1980s, the band struggled both financially and in its performance. Romano decided to try a new approach, and after many years the band began to see success in their marching competitions. He is known for starting the band's tradition of reciting their motto, "feet together, shoulders back, chins up, and eyes with pride" before taking the field.

In 1987, the Victor J. Andrew High School Marching Band started going to band camp at Pilgrim Park, a church camp located in Princeton, Illinois (Near Peoria, Illinois). Since then the band annually goes to Pilgrim Park to prepare for the upcoming season. While they're there they learn marching drill, visuals, marching techniques and keep trying to improve their music. The Victor J. Andrew High School Marching Band has attended many Bands Of America competitions. During their fall season they have traveled out of state to Cincinnati, Ohio, Centerville, Ohio, Pontiac, Michigan, St. Louis and Indianapolis, Indiana. They also attend many competitions in state. These have included Illinois State University Marching Band Invitational, Lake Park Joust, Amos Alonzo Stagg Band Jamboree, Lincoln Way East Marching Band Invitational, Mount Prospect Marching Knights. Knight of Champions Marching Band Competition, and Wheeling Marching Band Competition. Every year starting in 2010 (every other year from 1994 to 2008) the band competes in BOA Grand National Championships, held in the Lucas Oil Stadium in Indianapolis. During their spring season they have traveled to California, Nashville, and Orlando, Florida. While in Orlando, the band usually competes in parades and concert performances. The band travels to Orlando every three years. The band has also performed in the 6abc Dunkin' Donuts Thanksgiving Day Parade and in front of the Lincoln Memorial in Washington, D.C.

The Winter Percussion Ensemble is a 12 time Winter Guard International Finalist. The Ensemble has won 2 gold, 3 silver, and 2 bronze medals since 2011.

===== Relay For Life Fundraiser =====
The district also has a Relay For Life event that donates money towards the American Cancer Society. In 2010, the Relay For Life of District 230 raised nearly $400,000. This placed them first in the state of youth events and boosted the event to the second-largest youth event in the country. This 2nd in the nation was behind one large university, Virginia Tech. The relay has been going on for the past 13 years and was the first event of its kind in the country.

==== Theater ====
In fall 2018, the fall play, “The Night Thoreau Spent in Jail”, was selected to perform at the Illinois Theatrefest.

== Notable alumni ==
- Bill Bealles was an American football tackle in the National Football League (NFL).
- Keith Edmier is an artist.
- Armando Estrada (Hazem Ali) is a former professional wrestler/manager for the WWE.
- Gina Glocksen is a singer and 9th place finalist on the sixth season of American Idol.
- Garrett Jones is a former Major League Baseball player, and also played two seasons for the Yomiuri Giants.
- Nathan Everhart is a former tag team wrestling champion known under his stage name Jason Jordan
- Ben Kotwica is a football coach in the NFL.
- Christine Magnuson is a competitive swimmer, specializing in the butterfly stroke. She won 2 silver medals in swimming at the 2008 Summer Olympics.
- Ken Rutkowski is the host of Business Rockstars, an entrepreneurial business show based in Los Angeles, California.
- Kevin Sefcik is a former Major League Baseball player (1995–2001), playing most of his career with the Philadelphia Phillies.
- Michael Hastings a member of the Illinois Senate.
- Bonnie Tholl is the Head Softball Coach at the University of Michigan.
- Tatumn Milazzo is a professional soccer player. She currently plays for the Chicago Red Stars.
