= Lemont Township, Cook County, Illinois =

Lemont Township
- Township
- logo

- Location in Cook County

- Cook County's location in Illinois
- Coordinates: 41°39′52″N 87°57′49″W
- Country: United States
- State: Illinois
- County: Cook

Area
  - Total: 21.02 sq mi (54.4 km^{2})
  - Land: 20.37 sq mi (52.8 km^{2})
  - Water: 0.65 sq mi (1.7 km^{2}) 3.10%
- Elevation: 732 ft (223 m)

Population (2020)
  - Total: 22,645
  - Density: 1,112/sq mi (429.2/km^{2})
- Time zone: UTC-6 (CST)
  - Summer (DST): UTC-5 (CDT)
- ZIP codes: 60439, 60464, 60480
- FIPS code: 17-031-42808
- Website: www.lemonttownship.org

Lemont Township is one of 29 townships in Cook County, Illinois, USA. As of the 2020 census, its population was 22,645 and it contained 8,580 housing units.

== Geography ==
According to the 2021 census gazetteer files, Lemont Township has a total area of 21.02 square miles (54.44 km^{2}), of which 20.37 square miles (52.76 km^{2}) (or 96.90%) is land and 0.65 square miles (1.68 km^{2}) (or 3.10%) is water.

=== Cities, towns, villages ===
- Lemont (most)
- Palos Park (west edge)
- Willow Springs (west edge)
- Woodridge (partial)

=== Unincorporated towns ===
- Hastings at 41.681141°N 87.971725°W
- Sag Bridge at 41.688244°N 87.93182°W

=== Adjacent townships ===
- Downers Grove Township, DuPage County (north)
- Lyons Township (northeast)
- Palos Township (east)
- Orland Township (southeast)
- Homer Township, Will County (south)
- Lockport Township, Will County (southwest)
- DuPage Township, Will County (west)

=== Cemeteries ===
The township contains these four cemeteries: Bethany Lutheran, Danish, Mount Vernon Memorial Park and Saint Matthew Evangelical Lutheran.

=== Major highways ===
- Illinois Route 83
- Illinois Route 171

=== Airports and landing strips ===
- Lemont Fire Department Heliport
- Lemont Industrial Park Airport

(Closed and demolished for residential subdivision)

=== Rivers ===
- Des Plaines River

=== Lakes ===
- Goose Lake
- Holy Family Villa Lake

=== Landmarks ===
- Black Partridge Forest
- Red Gate Woods (Cook County Forest Preserves)
- Sag Quarries Forest Preserve
- Tampier Slough Woods (Cook County Forest Preserves)

== Demographics ==
As of the 2020 census there were 22,645 people, 7,500 households, and 5,927 families residing in the township. The population density was 1,077.41 inhabitants per square mile (415.99/km^{2}). There were 8,580 housing units at an average density of 408.22 per square mile (157.61/km^{2}). The racial makeup of the township was 89.41% White, 0.91% African American, 0.09% Native American, 2.43% Asian, 0.03% Pacific Islander, 1.37% from other races, and 5.76% from two or more races. Hispanic or Latino of any race were 6.81% of the population.

There were 7,500 households, out of which 36.50% had children under the age of 18 living with them, 69.39% were married couples living together, 7.51% had a female householder with no spouse present, and 20.97% were non-families. 17.30% of all households were made up of individuals, and 10.70% had someone living alone who was 65 years of age or older. The average household size was 2.90 and the average family size was 3.29.

The township's age distribution consisted of 23.1% under the age of 18, 7.4% from 18 to 24, 20.8% from 25 to 44, 28.9% from 45 to 64, and 19.7% who were 65 years of age or older. The median age was 43.9 years. For every 100 females, there were 100.2 males. For every 100 females age 18 and over, there were 94.5 males.

The median income for a household in the township was $117,900, and the median income for a family was $135,191. Males had a median income of $72,618 versus $43,533 for females. The per capita income for the township was $45,465. About 4.5% of families and 5.3% of the population were below the poverty line, including 6.6% of those under age 18 and 4.9% of those age 65 or over.

Historical population
Census	Pop.	Note	%±
1960	6,732		—
1970	8,314		23.5%
1980	8,850		6.4%
1990	11,537		30.4%
2000	18,002		56.0%
2010	21,113		17.3%
2020	22,645		7.3%
U.S. Decennial Census

== Politics ==
Lemont Township is split between Illinois' 1st congressional district in the southeast, a district which extends far into Chicago's South Side and suburbs, and the 11th district in the northwest, which extends deep into the city's far western suburbs; although Democrats won both races easily in 2024 by margins of 31 and 11 points respectively, Lemont Township voters favored Republicans with 62% of the vote. In the 2024 presidential election, Donald Trump received 60% of the vote in Lemont Township, his highest percentage in any township in Cook County, winning all 14 precincts.

- State House District 82
- State Senate District 41
