= Worth Township, Cook County, Illinois =

Worth Township
- Township
- Seal

- Location in Cook County

- Cook County's location in Illinois
- Coordinates: 41°41′21″N 87°44′43″W
- Country: United States
- State: Illinois
- County: Cook

Government
  - Supervisor: Patricia J Murphy (D)

Area
  - Total: 32.15 sq mi (83.3 km^{2})
  - Land: 31.81 sq mi (82.4 km^{2})
  - Water: 0.34 sq mi (0.88 km^{2}) 1.05%
- Elevation: 594 ft (181 m)

Population (2020)
  - Total: 152,934
  - Density: 4,808/sq mi (1,856/km^{2})
- Time zone: UTC-6 (CST)
  - Summer (DST): UTC-5 (CDT)
- ZIP codes: 60406, 60415, 60445, 60453, 60455, 60456, 60459, 60463, 60472, 60482 60655, 60803, 60805
- FIPS code: 17-031-83531
- Website: www.worthtownship.com

Worth Township is one of 29 townships in Cook County, Illinois. As of the 2020 census, its population was 152,934, with its most populous municipalities including Oak Lawn (pop. 58,362), Evergreen Park (19,943), Alsip (pop. 19,063), and Chicago Ridge (pop. 14,433). It was founded in 1849, when the county voted to subdivide itself into townships.

The township hall is located at 11601 S. Pulaski Road in Alsip. Other township municipalities include Hometown and Merrionette Park, as well as portions of Blue Island, Crestwood, Worth, Palos Heights, Robbins and Bridgeview. Worth Township's approximate borders are Harlem Avenue (Illinois Route 43) on the west, 87th Street on the north, Western Avenue on the east and 135th Street on the south. The township, however, does not include the parts of the city of Chicago (namely, zip code 60655, which is mostly the Mount Greenwood neighborhood) that lie within these boundaries. Near its southern boundary, the township is crossed by the Cal-Sag Channel.

== Geography ==
According to the 2021 census gazetteer files, Worth Township has a total area of 32.15 square miles (83.27 km^{2}), of which 31.81 square miles (82.39 km^{2}) (or 98.95%) is land and 0.34 square miles (0.88 km^{2}) (or 1.05%) is water.

=== Borders ===
Worth Township is bordered on the north by Stickney Township and the Chicago community of Ashburn, on the west by Palos Township, on the south by Bremen Township, and on the east by Calumet Township and the Chicago communities of Beverly, Mount Greenwood and Morgan Park.

=== Cities, towns, villages ===
- Alsip
- Blue Island (approximately 40% of the city, northwest of 135th Street and Western Avenue)
- Bridgeview (approximately one-half square mile, east of Harlem Avenue)
- Chicago (Beverly Country Club, Mount Greenwood and Mount Hope Cemeteries)
- Chicago Ridge
- Crestwood (nearly half the village, north of 135th Street)
- Evergreen Park
- Hometown
- Merrionette Park
- Oak Lawn
- Palos Heights (half the city, east of Harlem)
- Robbins (one quarter of the village, north of 135th Street)
- Worth (two thirds of the village, east of Harlem)

The south edge of the city of Chicago is within this township geographically but is a separate entity, with exception of two cemeteries and a golf course.

=== Unincorporated Towns ===
- Garden Homes at 41.681798°N 87.712642°W
- Hazel Green at 41.681931°N 87.743675°W

=== Adjacent townships ===
- Stickney Township (north)
- Calumet Township (east)
- Thornton Township (southeast)
- Bremen Township (south)
- Orland Township (southwest)
- Palos Township (west)
- Lyons Township (northwest)

=== Cemeteries ===
The township contains these sixteen cemeteries: Beverly Memorial Park, Burr Oak Cemetery, Chapel Hills Gardens South, Ever Rest (historical), Evergreen, First Evangelical Lutheran, Hazel Green, Holy Sepulchre Cemetery, Lincoln Cemetery, Mount Greenwood, Mount Hope, Oak Hill, Restvale Cemetery, Saint Benedict Catholic, Saint Mary's and Sauerbier-Burkhardt.

=== Major highways ===
- Interstate 294
- U.S. Route 12
- U.S. Route 20
- Illinois Route 43
- Illinois Route 50
- Illinois Route 83

=== Airports and landing strips ===
- Alsip Fire Department Heliport
- Christ Hospital Heliport

=== Landmarks ===
- Burr Oak Woods (Cook County Forest Preserves) (east half)
- Elizabeth A Conkey Forest (Cook County Forest Preserves)
- Joshua P. Young House

=== Lakes ===
- Lake Arrowhead

== Demographics ==
Worth Township, Illinois – Racial and ethnic composition Note: the US Census treats Hispanic/Latino as an ethnic category. This table excludes Latinos from the racial categories and assigns them to a separate category. Hispanics/Latinos may be of any race.
Race / Ethnicity (NH = Non-Hispanic)	Pop 2000	Pop 2010	Pop 2020	% 2000	% 2010	% 2020
White alone (NH)	127,523	108,825	92,391	83.77%	71.30%	60.41%
Black or African American alone (NH)	7,797	14,935	18,728	5.12%	9.78%	12.25%
Native American or Alaska Native alone (NH)	173	189	149	0.11%	0.12%	0.10%
Asian alone (NH)	2,109	2,541	3,069	1.39%	1.66%	2.01%
Native Hawaiian or Pacific Islander alone (NH)	17	33	34	0.01%	0.02%	0.02%
Other race alone (NH)	123	200	528	0.08%	0.13%	0.35%
Mixed race or Multiracial (NH)	2,663	1,890	3,782	1.75%	1.24%	2.47%
Hispanic or Latino (any race)	11,834	24,020	34,253	7.77%	15.74%	22.40%
Total	152,239	152,633	152,934	100.00%	100.00%	100.00%

As of the 2020 census there were 152,934 people, 57,145 households, and 36,413 families residing in the township. The population density was 4,756.59 inhabitants per square mile (1,836.53/km^{2}). There were 62,150 housing units at an average density of 1,933.01 units per square mile (746.34 units/km^{2}). The racial makeup of the township was 64.53% White, 12.50% African American, 0.71% Native American, 2.04% Asian, 0.04% Pacific Islander, 9.93% from other races, and 10.26% from two or more races. Hispanic or Latino of any race were 22.40% of the population.

There were 57,145 households, out of which 29.30% had children under the age of 18 living with them, 46.42% were married couples living together, 12.45% had a female householder with no spouse present, and 36.28% were non-families. 32.40% of all households were made up of individuals, and 14.90% had someone living alone who was 65 years of age or older. The average household size was 2.58 and the average family size was 3.32.

The township's age distribution consisted of 22.4% under the age of 18, 7.6% from 18 to 24, 26% from 25 to 44, 26.3% from 45 to 64, and 17.7% who were 65 years of age or older. The median age was 39.9 years. For every 100 females, there were 95.2 males. For every 100 females age 18 and over, there were 90.4 males.

The median income for a household in the township was $64,333, and the median income for a family was $80,145. Males had a median income of $50,240 versus $36,108 for females. The per capita income for the township was $31,359. About 8.5% of families and 11.1% of the population were below the poverty line, including 14.3% of those under age 18 and 9.6% of those age 65 or over.

Historical population
Census	Pop.	Note	%±
1930	13,729		—
1940	20,737		51.0%
1950	42,345		104.2%
1960	107,761		154.5%
1970	155,834		44.6%
1980	158,157		1.5%
1990	151,144		−4.4%
2000	152,239		0.7%
2010	152,633		0.3%
2020	152,934		0.2%
U.S. Decennial Census

== Governance ==
Worth Township is governed by 8 elected officials, chosen every four years. The current administration is:

Current township elected officials
Name	Elected position	Party affiliation & village	Other Party Affiliation
Patricia Joan Murphy	Supervisor	Democrat- Crestwood	Worth Township Community First
Eamon J. McMahon	Clerk	Independent- Oak Lawn	Worth Township Community First
Shaun C. Murphy	Assessor	Republican- Evergreen Park	Worth Township Community First
Vicki Moody	Highway Commissioner	Democrat- Chicago Ridge	Worth Township Community First
Jerry Hurckes	Trustee	Democrat- Oak Lawn	Worth Township Community First
Kelly Sexton-Kelly	Trustee	Independent- Evergreen Park	Worth Township Community First
Mychal J. Toscas	Trustee	Independent - Crestwood	Worth Township Community First
Richard Lewandowski	Trustee	Democrat- Palos Heights	Worth Township Community First

== Education ==
Worth Township is served by three public high school districts: Community High School District 218 (Dwight D. Eisenhower High School, Harold L. Richards High School and Alan B. Shepard High School), Oak Lawn Community High School District 229 and Evergreen Park Community High School District 231.

- Chicago Public Schools (some students)

Trinity Christian College is located in Worth Township, in Palos Heights.

== Political districts ==
- Illinois's 1st congressional district
- Illinois's 4th congressional district
- Illinois's 6th congressional district
- State House District 27
- State House District 28
- State House District 31
- State House District 35
- State House District 36
- State Senate District 14
- State Senate District 16
- State Senate District 18

== Record pension ==
In 2002, Lawrence Hupe, the Worth Township school treasurer, retired with one of the largest government pensions in Illinois after receiving annual bonuses exceeding 25% of his salary in the last five years of his 25-year service. At $153,835, Hupe's pension exceeded the state governor's salary. His employer, the Worth Township Board of School Trustees, reported to the Illinois Municipal Retirement Fund that Hupe took home an extra $302,000 above his salary between 1998 and 2002. Hupe claimed that the additional payments were in lieu of unused annual leave. Hupe's successor was paid a salary of $87,500, just 57% of Hupe's pension.
