= Worth, Illinois =

- Village
- Seal
- Motto: The Friendly Village, It's Worth a Trip
- Location of Worth in Cook County, Illinois.

- Location within Greater Chicago Location within Illinois Location within the United States
- Coordinates: 41°41′20″N 87°47′34″W
- Country: United States
- State: Illinois
- County: Cook
- Townships: Worth, Palos
- Incorporated: 1914

Government
  - Type: Trustee-village
  - President: Mary Werner (IND)

Area
  - Total: 2.38 sq mi (6.17 km^{2})
  - Land: 2.37 sq mi (6.13 km^{2})
  - Water: 0.012 sq mi (0.03 km^{2}) 0.42%

Population (2020)
  - Total: 10,970
  - Density: 4,631.2/sq mi (1,788.12/km^{2})

Standard of living (2007-11)
  - Per capita income: $27,271
  - Median home value: $193,200
- ZIP code(s): 60482
- Area code(s): 708
- Geocode: 83518
- FIPS code: 17-83518
- Website: www.villageofworth.com

Worth is a village in Cook County, Illinois, United States, a suburb of Chicago. As of the 2020 census, the population was 10,970.

== Geography ==
Worth is located at 41°41′20″N 87°47′34″W (41.688827, -87.792659).

According to the 2010 census, Worth has a total area of 2.383 square miles (6.17 km^{2}), of which 2.37 square miles (6.14 km^{2}) (or 99.45%) is land and 0.013 square miles (0.03 km^{2}) (or 0.55%) is water.

== Demographics ==
Historical population
Census	Pop.	Note	%±
1920	240		—
1930	411		71.3%
1940	702		70.8%
1950	1,472		109.7%
1960	8,196		456.8%
1970	11,999		46.4%
1980	11,592		−3.4%
1990	11,208		−3.3%
2000	11,047		−1.4%
2010	10,789		−2.3%
2020	10,970		1.7%
U.S. Decennial Census; 2010 2020

=== Racial and ethnic composition ===
Worth village, Illinois – Racial and ethnic composition Note: the US Census treats Hispanic/Latino as an ethnic category. This table excludes Latinos from the racial categories and assigns them to a separate category. Hispanics/Latinos may be of any race.
Race / Ethnicity (NH = Non-Hispanic)	Pop 2000	Pop 2010	Pop 2020	% 2000	% 2010	% 2020
White alone (NH)	9,850	8,942	8,138	89.16%	82.88%	74.18%
Black or African American alone (NH)	175	266	466	1.58%	2.47%	4.25%
Native American or Alaska Native alone (NH)	11	13	5	0.10%	0.12%	0.05%
Asian alone (NH)	133	198	242	1.20%	1.84%	2.21%
Native Hawaiian or Pacific Islander alone (NH)	1	1	4	0.01%	0.01%	0.04%
Other race alone (NH)	17	17	63	0.15%	0.16%	0.57%
Mixed race or Multiracial (NH)	191	122	344	1.73%	1.13%	3.14%
Hispanic or Latino (any race)	669	1,230	1,708	6.06%	11.40%	15.57%
Total	11,047	10,789	10,970	100.00%	100.00%	100.00%

=== 2020 census ===
As of the 2020 census, Worth had a population of 10,970. The population density was 4,605.37 inhabitants per square mile (1,778.14/km^{2}).

The median age was 38.6 years. 21.6% of residents were under the age of 18 and 15.0% of residents were 65 years of age or older. For every 100 females, there were 100.3 males, and for every 100 females age 18 and over there were 100.1 males age 18 and over.

100.0% of residents lived in urban areas, while 0.0% lived in rural areas.

There were 4,416 households in Worth, of which 29.5% had children under the age of 18 living in them. Of all households, 41.3% were married-couple households, 24.0% were households with a male householder and no spouse or partner present, and 27.6% were households with a female householder and no spouse or partner present. About 30.7% of all households were made up of individuals and 10.6% had someone living alone who was 65 years of age or older. There were 2,670 families. The average household size was 3.27 and the average family size was 2.60.

There were 4,611 housing units at an average density of 1,935.77 per square mile (747.40/km^{2}), of which 4.2% were vacant. The homeowner vacancy rate was 1.9% and the rental vacancy rate was 4.6%.

=== Income and poverty ===
The median income for a household in the village was $59,464, and the median income for a family was $68,936. Males had a median income of $43,617 versus $29,739 for females. The per capita income for the village was $28,284. About 10.6% of families and 13.3% of the population were below the poverty line, including 24.2% of those under age 18 and 6.1% of those age 65 or over.

== Government ==
=== Village government ===
The Village of Worth operates under a President-Trustee form of Government with a Village President (Mayor) and a Village Board composed of six Village Trustees (Councilmen / Aldermen) elected at large.

The elected officials are:

- President Mary Werner (Independent) - Current term expires in April 2025
- Clerk Bonnie M. Price (Independent) - Current term expires in April 2025
- Trustee Rich Dziedzic (Independent), - Current term expires in April 2025
- Trustee Pete Kats (Independent), - Current term expires in April 2023
- Trustee Tedd Muersch Jr. (Independent), - Current term expires in April 2025
- Trustee Laura Packwood (Independent), - Current term expires in April 2023
- Trustee Kevin Ryan (Independent), - Current term expires in April 2023
- Trustee Brad Urban (Independent), - Current term expires in April 2025

All six trustees are elected at large with three being elected at the same time as the President and three being elected two years later.

The Village of Worth has separately elected boards, independent of the Village to administer:

- Worth Park District
- Worth Public Library District
- Worth School District 127

=== State and federal government ===
Worth is located in Illinois's 6th congressional district which is represented by Sean Casten (D-Downers Grove).

Worth is located within 18th State Senate District, which is represented by William Cunningham (D-Chicago); and located in the 35th Representative District, which is represented by Fran Hurley (D-Chicago), and the 36th Representative District, which is represented by Kelly Burke (D-Evergreen Park).

=== Township and county government ===
The village of Worth is located in the 6th and 17th County Board Districts. Worth is in two townships - east of Harlem Avenue is Worth Township, and west of Harlem Avenue is Palos Township.

== Infrastructure ==
The North Palos Fire Protection District operates Station #3 in Worth.

== Education ==
Worth is served by several public school districts. Worth School District 127 operates public elementary and middle schools.

Some residents are zoned to Alan B. Shepard High School of Community High School District 218 and others are zoned to Amos Alonzo Stagg High School of Consolidated High School District 230.

Moraine Valley Community College is the area community college.

Worth Public Library District operates public libraries.

== Transportation ==
Worth has a station on Metra's SouthWest Service, which provides weekday rail service between Manhattan, Illinois and Chicago Union Station. Additionally, the Palos Heights station serves the southwest side of the village. Pace provides bus service on multiple routes connecting Worth to destinations across the Southland.
