= Willow Springs, Illinois =

- Village
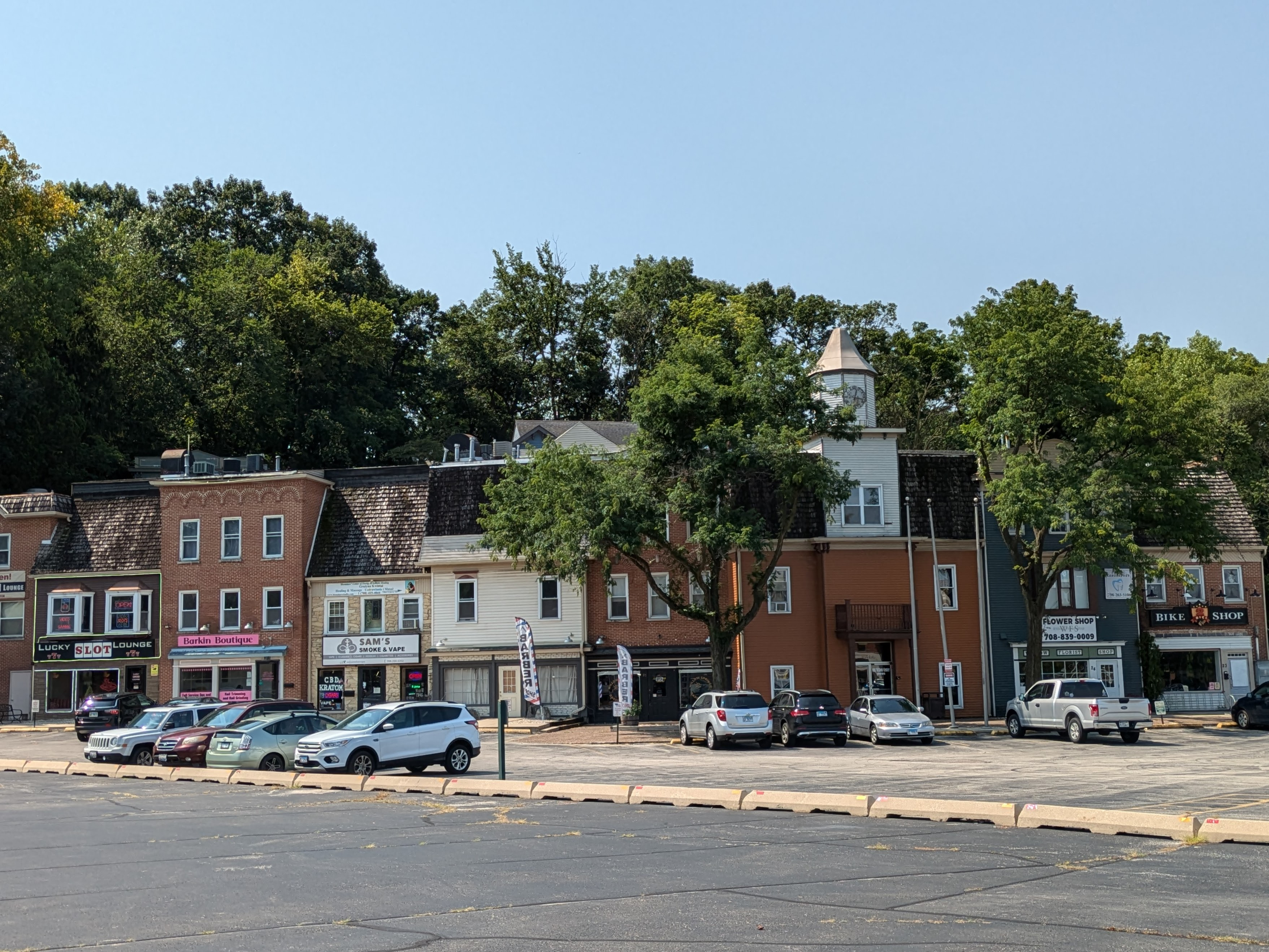
- Old Willow Shopping Center on Archer, by the Palos Forest Preserves

- Seal

- Location of Willow Springs in Cook County, Illinois.

- Location within Greater Chicago Location within Illinois Location within the United States
- Coordinates: 41°44′30″N 87°52′40″W
- Country: United States
- State: Illinois
- Counties: Cook, DuPage
- Townships: Lyons, Palos, Lemont, Downers Grove

Government
  - Type: Council–manager
  - Mayor: Melissa N. Neddermeyer

Area
  - Total: 4.25 sq mi (11.02 km^{2})
  - Land: 4.15 sq mi (10.75 km^{2})
  - Water: 0.10 sq mi (0.27 km^{2})
- Elevation: 594 ft (181 m)

Population (2020)
  - Total: 5,857
  - Density: 1,410/sq mi (545/km^{2})
- Time zone: UTC-6 (CST)
  - Summer (DST): UTC-5 (CDT)
- ZIP code: 60480
- Area codes: 708/464, 630/331
- FIPS code: 17-82049
- GNIS feature ID: 2399701
- Website: www.willowsprings-il.gov

Willow Springs is a village in Cook County, Illinois, United States, with a small portion extending into DuPage County. The village was founded in 1892 and was named for the springs along the Des Plaines River. In 2020, the population was 5,857.

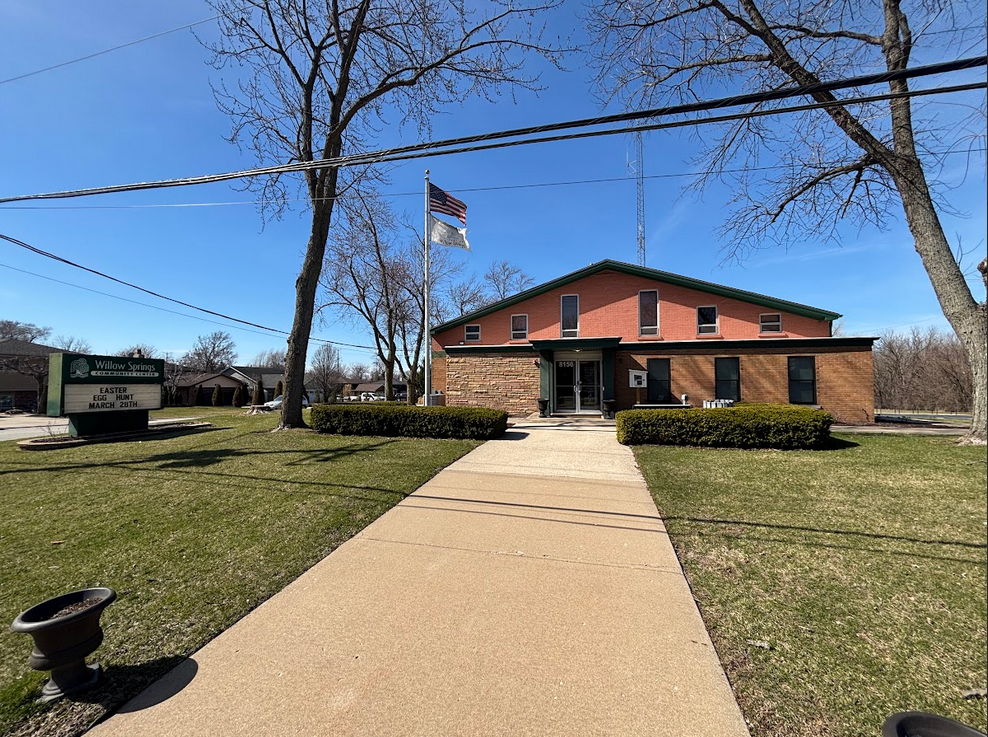
Community Center

== History ==
As the French began to explore the region, its position on the Des Plaines River made it a part of the Chicago portage. In would later gain the I&M Canal and the Sanitary and Ship Canal in 1848 and 1900 respectively.

In 1957, the Grimes sisters were found dead in Willow Springs. In 1987, former chief of police Michael J. Corbitt was arrested and convicted of racketeering and murder.

Willowbrook Ballroom was destroyed by fire in 2016.

== Geography ==
Willow Springs is located on the banks of the Des Plaines River and the Chicago Sanitary and Ship Canal, adjacent to the Palos Forest Preserves.

According to the 2021 census gazetteer files, Willow Springs has a total area of 4.25 square miles (11.01 km^{2}), of which 4.15 square miles (10.75 km^{2}) (or 97.55%) is land and 0.10 square miles (0.26 km^{2}) (or 2.45%) is water.

Neighboring communities are Hickory Hills, Justice, Hodgkins, and Burr Ridge.

== Demographics ==
=== Racial and ethnic composition ===
Willow Springs village, Illinois – Racial and ethnic composition Note: the US Census treats Hispanic/Latino as an ethnic category. This table excludes Latinos from the racial categories and assigns them to a separate category. Hispanics/Latinos may be of any race.
Race / Ethnicity (NH = Non-Hispanic)	Pop 2000	Pop 2010	Pop 2020	% 2000	% 2010	% 2020
White alone (NH)	4,542	4,794	4,679	90.35%	86.78%	79.89%
Black or African American alone (NH)	36	56	77	0.72%	1.01%	1.31%
Native American or Alaska Native alone (NH)	5	0	15	0.10%	0.00%	0.26%
Asian alone (NH)	93	145	202	1.85%	2.62%	3.45%
Native Hawaiian or Pacific Islander alone (NH)	0	0	0	0.00%	0.00%	0.00%
Other race alone (NH)	0	2	15	0.00%	0.04%	0.26%
Mixed race or Multiracial (NH)	97	56	154	1.93%	1.01%	2.63%
Hispanic or Latino (any race)	254	471	715	5.05%	8.53%	12.21%
Total	5,027	5,524	5,857	100.00%	100.00%	100.00%

=== 2020 census ===
As of the 2020 census, Willow Springs had a population of 5,857. The median age was 47.1 years. 18.0% of residents were under the age of 18 and 21.6% were 65 years of age or older. For every 100 females, there were 99.1 males, and for every 100 females age 18 and over, there were 98.0 males age 18 and over.

99.8% of residents lived in urban areas, while 0.2% lived in rural areas.

There were 2,426 households in Willow Springs, including 1,494 families. Of all households, 25.4% had children under the age of 18 living in them, 53.7% were married-couple households, 19.3% were households with a male householder and no spouse or partner present, and 22.0% were households with a female householder and no spouse or partner present. About 26.3% of all households were made up of individuals and 10.6% had someone living alone who was 65 years of age or older.

The population density was 1,377.15 inhabitants per square mile (531.72/km^{2}). There were 2,545 housing units at an average density of 598.40 per square mile (231.04/km^{2}), of which 4.7% were vacant. The homeowner vacancy rate was 1.4% and the rental vacancy rate was 6.6%.

=== Income and poverty ===
The median income for a household in the village was $98,664, and the median income for a family was $123,531. Males had a median income of $61,136 versus $58,704 for females. The per capita income for the village was $51,333. About 3.1% of families and 2.6% of the population were below the poverty line, including 2.6% of those under age 18 and 2.3% of those age 65 or over.

Historical population
Census	Pop.	Note	%±
1900	378		—
1910	334		−11.6%
1920	134		−59.9%
1930	733		447.0%
1940	948		29.3%
1950	1,314		38.6%
1960	2,348		78.7%
1970	3,318		41.3%
1980	4,147		25.0%
1990	4,509		8.7%
2000	5,027		11.5%
2010	5,524		9.9%
2020	5,857		6.0%
U.S. Decennial Census; 2010 2020

== Government ==
Most of Willow Springs is in Illinois's 3rd congressional district, while the northwestern portion is in the 6th district. The current mayor is Melissa Neddermeyer. The current Board of Village Trustees are: Michael Kennedy (Term Expires 2025); Rick Mika (Term Expires 2025); Tom Arra (Term Expires 2025); Terrence M. Carr (Term Expires 2027); Ernie Moon (Term Expires 2027); and Fred Posch (Term Expires 2027).

== Education ==
Public elementary and middle school students living south of the Des Plaines River and the canals attend Willow Springs School District 108, while those living north attend Pleasantdale Elementary and Pleasantdale Middle School in Pleasantdale School District 107. At the high school level, all District 107 students move onto Lyons Township High School (District 204) in La Grange/Western Springs, IL. Some District 108 students move onto Argo Community High School (District 217) in Summit, Illinois. Another portion of District 108 students attend Amos Alonzo Stagg High School (Consolidated High School District 230) in Palos Hills, Illinois. Trinity Lutheran School is also in the area.

The College of DuPage serves residents north of the river while Moraine Valley Community College serves those south of the river.

== Infrastructure ==
=== Transportation ===
Willow Springs station is on Metra's Heritage Corridor line, which provides weekday rail service between Joliet and Chicago Union Station.

Pace provides bus service on Route 390 connecting Willow Springs to Burbank, Chicago, and other destinations.

== Movie location ==
Willow Springs was used as a set location for the film The Lake House, starring Sandra Bullock and Keanu Reeves.
