= Hickory Hills, Illinois =

City in Cook County, Illinois, United States

- City
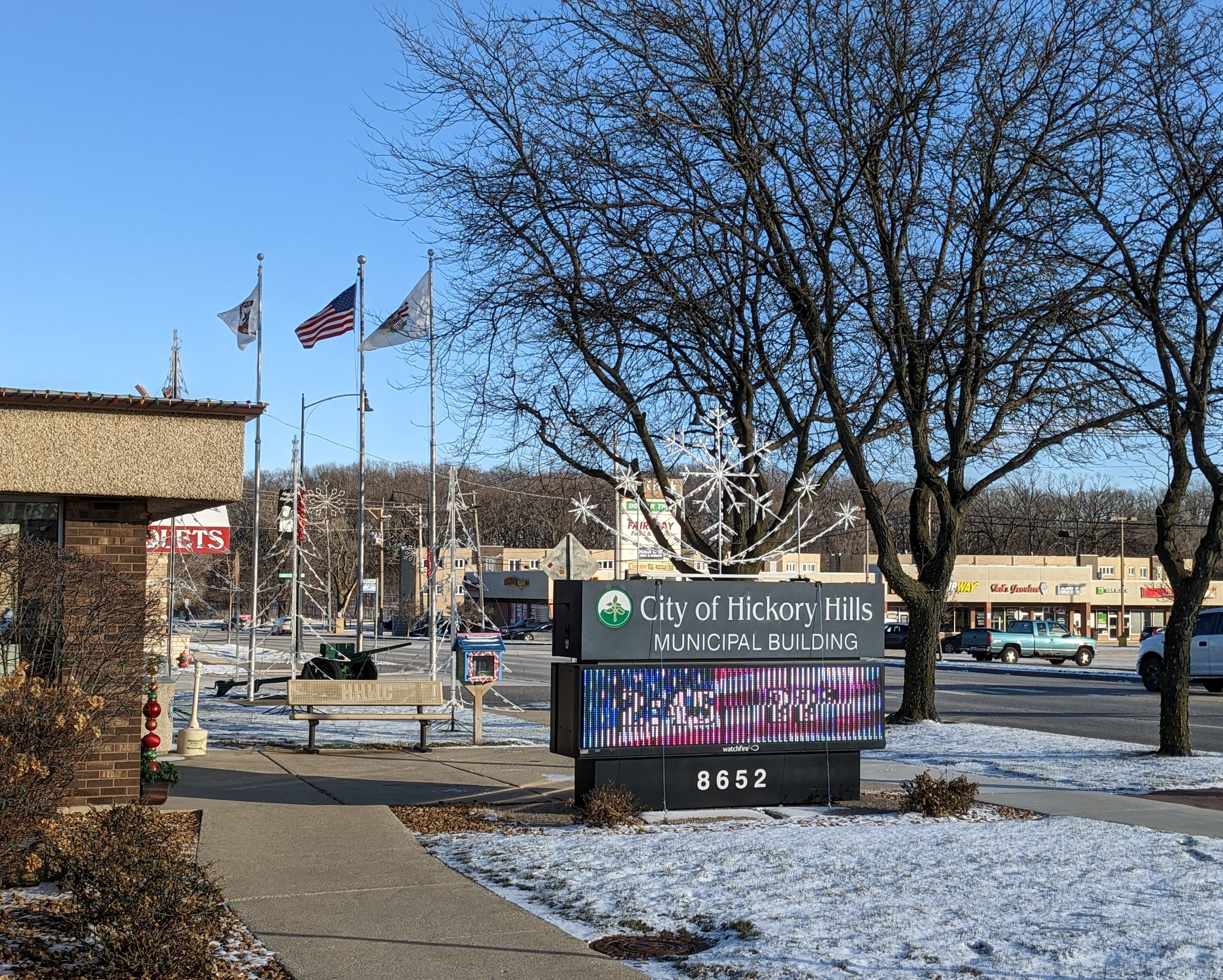
- 95th Street, Hickory Hills

- Seal

- Location of Hickory Hills in Cook County, Illinois.

- Location within Greater Chicago Location within Illinois Location within the United States
- Coordinates: 41°43′26″N 87°49′37″W
- Country: United States
- State: Illinois
- County: Cook
- Townships: Palos, Lyons
- Incorporated: 1951

Government
  - Type: Mayor–council
  - Mayor: Mike Howley

Area
  - Total: 2.85 sq mi (7.37 km^{2})
  - Land: 2.85 sq mi (7.37 km^{2})
  - Water: 0 sq mi (0.00 km^{2}) 0%
- Elevation: 680 ft (210 m)

Population (2020)
  - Total: 14,505
  - Density: 5,100/sq mi (1,969/km^{2})

Standard of living (2022)
  - Per capita income: $35,000
  - Median home value: $250,000
- ZIP code(s): 60457
- Area code(s): 708
- Geocode: 34514
- FIPS code: 17-34514
- Website: www.hickoryhillsil.org

Hickory Hills is a city in Cook County, Illinois, United States. Located principally in Palos Township, it is a suburb of Chicago. The population in 2020 was 14,505.

== History ==
The Hickory Hills Country Club was founded in 1917 in the area of the present-day city, with an 18-hole golf course designed by Scottish-American golfer James Foulis. The club exists to the present day.

The village of Hickory Hills was incorporated in September 1951 from the territory between 91st to 95th street, and between 80th to 88th avenue. The village at the time of incorporation had around 600 residents. Voters approved a change from village to city form of government in October 1966.

In 1961, the Poor Clares nuns, a branch of the Franciscan order, acquired 20 acres of land at 89th street and Keane avenue with which to establish a new monastery. However, the monastery closed in 1992 due to dwindling numbers. The order returned to Chicago in 1999, moving to a new monastery in nearby Palos Park in 2003.

== Geography ==
Hickory Hills lies on the relatively hilly Tinley Moraine, a belt of ridges laid down about 14,000 years ago during the Wisconsin glaciation.

Most of present-day Hickory Hills lies in the northern part of Palos Township, excepting those parts north of 87th Street which lie in Lyons Township. The city's main east–west thoroughfares are 87th Street and 95th Street, the latter carrying U.S. Route 12 and Route 20 across the South Chicago suburbs. The city is bounded on the west by the Palos Forest Preserves, a nature reserve, and on the east by the Tri-State Tollway (Interstate 294). Neighboring communities are Palos Hills, Bridgeview, Justice, and Willow Springs.

== Demographics ==
Historical population
Census	Pop.	Note	%±
1960	2,707		—
1970	13,176		386.7%
1980	13,778		4.6%
1990	13,021		−5.5%
2000	13,926		7.0%
2010	14,049		0.9%
2020	14,505		3.2%
U.S. Decennial Census; 2010 2020

=== Racial and ethnic composition ===
Hickory Hills city, Illinois – Racial and ethnic composition Note: the US Census treats Hispanic/Latino as an ethnic category. This table excludes Latinos from the racial categories and assigns them to a separate category. Hispanics/Latinos may be of any race.
Race / Ethnicity (NH = Non-Hispanic)	Pop 2000	Pop 2010	Pop 2020	% 2000	% 2010	% 2020
White alone (NH)	11,949	11,241	10,947	85.80%	80.01%	75.47%
Black or African American alone (NH)	161	449	462	1.16%	3.20%	3.19%
Native American or Alaska Native alone (NH)	20	10	10	0.14%	0.07%	0.07%
Asian alone (NH)	288	359	389	2.07%	2.56%	2.68%
Pacific Islander alone (NH)	1	0	0	0.01%	0.00%	0.00%
Other race alone (NH)	20	21	39	0.14%	0.15%	0.27%
Mixed Race or Multiracial (NH)	358	192	329	2.57%	1.37%	2.27%
Hispanic or Latino (any race)	1,129	1,777	2,329	8.11%	12.65%	16.06%
Total	13,926	14,049	14,505	100.00%	100.00%	100.00%

=== 2020 census ===
As of the 2020 census, Hickory Hills had a population of 14,505, with 5,342 households and 3,517 families. The population density was 5,100.21 inhabitants per square mile (1,969.20/km^{2}), and there were 5,543 housing units at an average density of 1,949.02 per square mile (752.52/km^{2}).

The median age was 39.3 years. About 21.9% of residents were under the age of 18 and 16.8% were 65 years of age or older. For every 100 females there were 99.8 males, and for every 100 females age 18 and over there were 99.8 males age 18 and over.

There were 5,342 households, of which 31.3% had children under the age of 18 living in them. Of all households, 52.9% were married-couple households, 18.8% were households with a male householder and no spouse or partner present, and 24.1% were households with a female householder and no spouse or partner present. About 25.1% of all households were made up of individuals and 11.4% had someone living alone who was 65 years of age or older.

There were 5,543 housing units, of which 3.6% were vacant. The homeowner vacancy rate was 1.2% and the rental vacancy rate was 5.9%. 100.0% of residents lived in urban areas, while 0.0% lived in rural areas.

=== Ancestry ===
The top five ancestries reported in Hickory Hills as of 2020 were Polish (24.7%), Arab (11.5%), Irish (6.8%), Lithuanian (6.7%), and German (5.9%).

== Government ==
Since the 2021 redistricting, Hickory Hills has been in Illinois's 6th congressional district. It was in the 3rd congressional district from 2011 to 2021.

== Education ==
School districts serving Hickory Hills include:

- North Palos School District 117
- Indian Springs District 109
- Amos Alonzo Stagg High School of Consolidated High School District 230 - Students in the District 117 zone attend Stagg
- Argo Community High School - Students in the District 109 zone attend Argo
- Moraine Valley Community College District 524

St. Patricia School, a private Catholic school, is in the area.

Hickory Hills is home to a satellite campus of Lewis University located near 95th street and Roberts Road.

== Infrastructure ==
The Roberts Park Fire Protection District serves the community.

=== Transportation ===
Pace provides bus service on routes 379, 381 and 385 connecting Hickory Hills to destinations across the Southland.

== Notable people ==
- James Hickey, (born 1960), United States Army soldier notable for his leadership role in Operation Red Dawn, the military effort that captured Saddam Hussein. He was raised in Hickory Hills.
- Marty Casey (born 1973), rock musician
- Max Strus (born 1996), professional basketball player.
