= North Palos School District 117 =

School district in Palos Heights, Illinois, USA

Address
- 7825 West 103rd Street Palos Hills, Illinois, 60465; United States

District information
- Type: Public
- Grades: PreK–8
- NCES District ID: 1728890

Students and staff
- Students: 3,472

Other information
- Website: www.npd117.net

North Palos School District 117 (NPD 117) is a school district headquartered in Palos Hills, Illinois, in the Chicago metropolitan area.

It serves Palos Hills, Hickory Hills, and a section of Bridgeview.

== History ==
It was first established as the Palos School District No. 4 around 1858. Its first school was the North Palos School. In 1900 the name changed to Cook County School District 117 as school districts became numbered according to the county instead of according to the township.

== Schools ==
Middle Schools:

- Conrady Junior High School (Hickory Hills)
- Elementary schools:
  - Dorn Elementary School (Hickory Hills)
  - Glen Oaks Elementary School (Hickory Hills)
  - Oak Ridge Elementary School (Palos Hills)
  - Sorrick Elementary School (Palos Hills)
