= Willow Springs School District 108 =

School district in Illinois, United States

Address
- 8345 Archer Avenue Willow Springs, Illinois, 60480; United States

District information
- Type: Public
- Grades: K–8
- NCES District ID: 1742570

Students and staff
- Students: 383

Other information
- Website: www.willowspringsschool.org

Willow Springs School District 108 is a school district headquartered in Willow Springs, Illinois, in the Chicago metropolitan area. It serves Willow Springs and unincorporated areas with Justice, Illinois addresses. It has a single school, Willow Springs School, which was initially located in a school building with four rooms. It began occupying its current site in the 1920s and the school building received an addition on its west side in 2005; this addition added main offices, computer labs, and a learning resource center.
