= Worth School District 127 =

School district in Illinois, United States

Address
- 11218 South Ridgeland Avenue Cook County, Illinois, 60482; United States

District information
- Type: Public school district
- Grades: PreK–8
- NCES District ID: 1743380

Students and staff
- Students: 1,084

Other information
- Website: www.worthschools.org

Worth School District 127 is an elementary school district based in Worth, a southern Chicago suburb located in Cook County, Illinois. District 127 is composed of two elementary schools, one junior high school, and a preschool institution; all schools are located within the village of Worth. Students may begin their careers in the district as preschoolers at Worthridge School. They may alternatively enter the district as kindergarteners in either Worth Elementary School or Worthwoods Elementary School, which serve kindergarteners and students between grades one and five under, respectively, principals Joe Zampillo and Tim Hathhorn. Graduates of the two elementary schools move on to attend Worth Junior High School, which is headed by its principal, Dr. Peter Yuska. The district superintendent is Dr. Rita Wojtylewski.
