= Palos Hills, Illinois =

- City
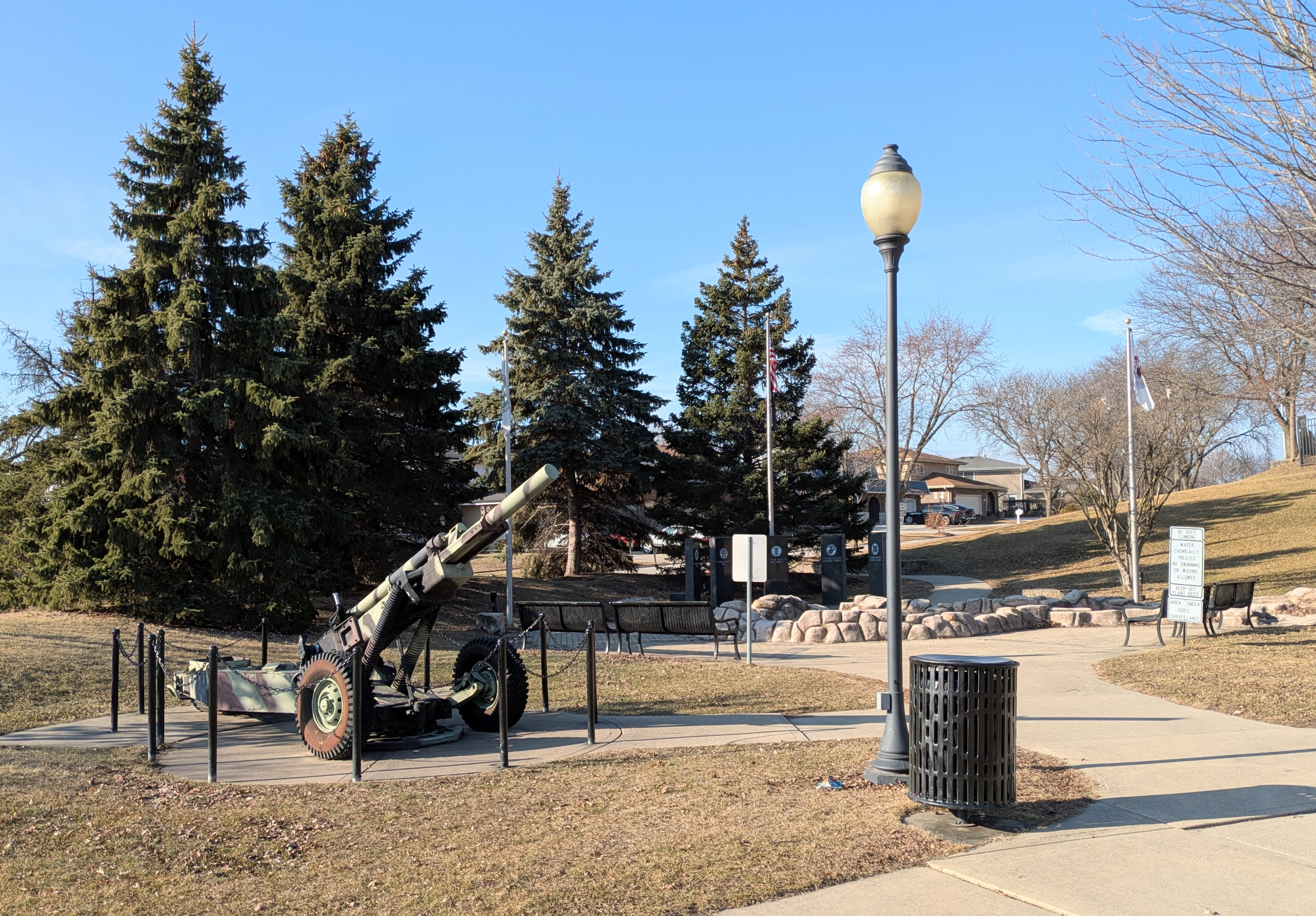
- Town Square Park, Palos Hills

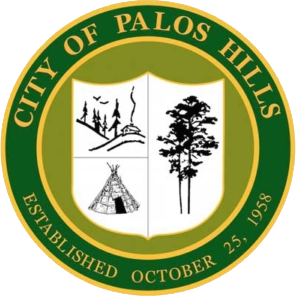
- Seal
- Motto: "Pride In Progress"
- Location of Palos Hills in Cook County, Illinois.

- Location within Greater Chicago Location within Illinois Location within the United States
- Coordinates: 41°41′57″N 87°49′35″W
- Country: United States
- State: Illinois
- County: Cook
- Township: Palos
- Incorporated: 1958

Government
  - Type: Mayor–council
  - Mayor: Gerald Bennett

Area
  - Total: 4.29 sq mi (11.11 km^{2})
  - Land: 4.25 sq mi (11.00 km^{2})
  - Water: 0.042 sq mi (0.11 km^{2}) 0.93%

Population (2020)
  - Total: 18,530
  - Density: 4,363.8/sq mi (1,684.87/km^{2})

Standard of living (2007-11)
  - Per capita income: $29,783
  - Median home value: $223,200
- ZIP code(s): 60465
- Area code(s): 708
- Geocode: 57394
- FIPS code: 17-57394
- Website: www.paloshillsweb.org

Palos Hills is a city in Cook County, Illinois, United States. It is a southwest suburb of Chicago. The city was established in 1958 and had reached a population of 18,530 in the 2020 census. It is named after Palos de la Frontera, Spain, from which Christopher Columbus set sail to North America. Moraine Valley Community College and Amos Alonzo Stagg High School are its main schools.

== Geography ==
According to the 2021 census gazetteer files, Palos Hills has a total area of 4.29 square miles (11.11 km^{2}), of which 4.25 square miles (11.01 km^{2}) (or 98.97%) is land and 0.04 square miles (0.10 km^{2}) (or 1.03%) is water.

Neighboring communities are Palos Park, Palos Heights, Worth, Bridgeview and Hickory Hills.

== Demographics ==
Historical population
Census	Pop.	Note	%±
1960	3,766		—
1970	6,629		76.0%
1980	16,654		151.2%
1990	17,803		6.9%
2000	17,665		−0.8%
2010	17,484		−1.0%
2020	18,530		6.0%
U.S. Decennial Census; 2010 2020

=== Racial and ethnic composition ===
Palos Hills city, Illinois – Racial and ethnic composition Note: the US Census treats Hispanic/Latino as an ethnic category. This table excludes Latinos from the racial categories and assigns them to a separate category. Hispanics/Latinos may be of any race.
Race / Ethnicity (NH = Non-Hispanic)	Pop 2000	Pop 2010	Pop 2020	% 2000	% 2010	% 2020
White alone (NH)	14,897	14,591	14,729	84.33%	83.45%	79.49%
Black or African American alone (NH)	960	926	1,040	5.43%	5.30%	5.61%
Native American or Alaska Native alone (NH)	12	14	9	0.07%	0.08%	0.05%
Asian alone (NH)	468	450	392	2.65%	2.57%	2.12%
Pacific Islander alone (NH)	2	4	0	0.01%	0.02%	0.00%
Other race alone (NH)	19	14	85	0.11%	0.00%	0.46%
Mixed race or Multiracial (NH)	453	193	386	2.56%	1.10%	2.08%
Hispanic or Latino (any race)	854	1,292	1,889	4.83%	7.39%	10.19%
Total	17,665	17,484	18,530	100.00%	100.00%	100.00%

=== 2020 census ===
As of the 2020 census, Palos Hills had a population of 18,530. There were 7,375 households and 4,209 families residing in the city. The population density was 4,319.35 inhabitants per square mile (1,667.71/km^{2}). The city contained 7,697 housing units at an average density of 1,794.17 per square mile (692.73/km^{2}).

The median age was 41.6 years. 20.5% of residents were under the age of 18 and 20.2% were 65 years of age or older. For every 100 females there were 92.4 males, and for every 100 females age 18 and over there were 89.4 males age 18 and over.

99.9% of residents lived in urban areas, while 0.1% lived in rural areas.

There were 7,375 households in Palos Hills, of which 28.2% had children under the age of 18 living in them. Of all households, 46.7% were married-couple households, 18.2% were households with a male householder and no spouse or partner present, and 29.9% were households with a female householder and no spouse or partner present. About 30.1% of all households were made up of individuals and 14.4% had someone living alone who was 65 years of age or older.

There were 7,697 housing units, of which 4.2% were vacant. The homeowner vacancy rate was 1.3% and the rental vacancy rate was 7.5%.

Racial composition as of the 2020 census
Race	Number	Percent
White	15,139	81.7%
Black or African American	1,070	5.8%
American Indian and Alaska Native	34	0.2%
Asian	402	2.2%
Native Hawaiian and Other Pacific Islander	1	0.0%
Some other race	629	3.4%
Two or more races	1,255	6.8%
Hispanic or Latino (of any race)	1,889	10.2%

=== Ancestry ===
The top reported ancestries as of 2020 were Polish (29.3%), German (12.7%), Irish (12.6%), Arab (9.6%), and Italian (8.3%).

=== Income ===
The median income for a household in the city was $64,364, and the median income for a family was $81,045. Males had a median income of $57,339 versus $37,926 for females. The per capita income for the city was $34,564. About 9.3% of families and 12.0% of the population were below the poverty line, including 15.1% of those under age 18 and 11.6% of those age 65 or over.

== Government ==
Palos Hills is in Illinois's 3rd congressional district.

The City of Palos Hills operates under a Mayor/Council form of government with a Mayor, Clerk and City Treasurer elected at large and 10 Aldermen elected from 5 dual member wards.

- Mayor Gerald R. Bennett
- City Clerk Rudy Mulderink
- City Treasurer Kenneth Nolan.

Aldermen:

- Ward 1: Martin Kleefisch and Michael Price
- Ward 2: Pauline Stratton and Mark Brachman
- Ward 3: A.J. Pasek and Michael Lebarre
- Ward 4: Joseph Marrotta and Phil Abed
- Ward 5: Dawn Nowak and Donna O'Connel

North Palos Fire Protection District operates Station 1 and Station 2 in Palos Hills.

== Education ==
Elementary school districts serving Palos Hills:

- North Palos School District 117
- Palos School District 118
  - All sections are zoned to Palos South Middle School in Palos Park. Currently sections of Palos Hills in District 118 are divided between Palos East Elementary in Palos Heights and Palos West Elementary in Palos Park. Prior to 2016-2017 all of the District 118 portion of Palos Hills was in the Palos East zone.

Amos Alonzo Stagg High School of the Consolidated High School District 230 serves Palos Hills.

There is also a private PK - 8 school in Palos Hills called Koraes Elementary School.

Moraine Valley Community College is the area community college.

== Transportation ==
Pace provides bus service on multiple routes connecting Palos Hills to destinations across the Southland.

== Notable people ==
- Leslie Cichocki, Paralympic swimmer
- Nick Drnaso, cartoonist and illustrator
- Christian Dvorak, professional ice hockey player
- Katie Eberling, bobsledder
- Tim Kopinski, tennis player
- T. J. McFarland, professional baseball pitcher
- Nadeshot, content creator, founder of 100 Thieves and former professional Call of Duty player
- Herb Schumann, former Cook County commissioner
- Ben Skora, inventor who specialized in robotics and home automation
- Anne S. Zickus, businesswoman and former Illinois House of Representatives member
