= Palos School District 118 =

School district in Illinois, United States

Address
- 8800 West 119th Street Palos Park, Illinois, 60464; United States

District information
- Type: Public
- Grades: PreK–8
- NCES District ID: 1730600

Students and staff
- Students: 1,979

Other information
- Website: www.palos118.org

Palos School District 118 (Palos 118) is a school district headquartered in Palos Park, Illinois, in the Chicago metropolitan area.

The district serves these areas: Palos Park, Palos Heights, and a southern section of Palos Hills. It also serves unincorporated areas with "Orland Park, Illinois" postal addresses.

For the 2016–2017 school year the district transferred about 150 families to Palos West to rebalance elementary school enrollment. As of the fall of 2020, 1,958 students were enrolled in the district. The current superintendent is Anthony M. Scarsella.

The spirit colors of the district's schools are Red, Black, and White.

The mascot of the district is a Northern Cardinal.

== Schools ==
- Palos East Elementary School - Palos Heights, Principal Robert Szklanecki
- Palos West Elementary School - Palos Park, Principal Jennifer Peloquin
- Palos South Middle School - Palos Park, Principal Stuart Wrzesinski
