= The Cytokine Society =

Non-profit organization

The Cytokine Society, formerly known as the International Cytokine & Interferon Society is a non-profit organization composed of researchers of cytokines, interferons and chemokine cell biology, molecular biology, biochemistry, and the use of biological response modifiers clinically. As the premier organization in the field of cytokine and chemokine biology, this group has more than 950 member scientists and holds annual conferences around the world.

== Cytokine Society Leadership ==
The Cytokine Society has an elected Council that oversees operations. Curt M. Horvath (Northwestern University, USA) is President (2025-2027), and Karen Mossman (McMaster University, Canada) is President-Elect. Sarah Gaffen (University of Pittsburgh, USA) is immediate Past-President.

== History ==
The Cytokine Society has historical origins. The precursor ICIS was created from two founder groups: The International Cytokine Society (ICS) and the International Society for Interferon and Cytokine Research (ISICR). The two organizations merged to become the International Cytokine and Interferon Society in 2013. In 2025, the membership voted to change the name of the society to "The Cytokine Society" which went into effect at Cytokines2026.

== Annual Meetings ==
The Cytokine Society holds annual conferences around the world, usually in October or November. The 2024 conference was held jointly with the Korean Association of Immunology at the COEX Convention & Exhibition Center Seoul, Korea. The conference featured keynote speakers Professors Judi Allen (University of Manchester) and Nobel Laureate Drew Weissman (University of Pennsylvania). The 2025 ICIS meeting was held Nov 2-5 in Seattle Washington and featured Nobel Laureates David Baker (University of Washington) and Charlie Rice (Rockefeller University), and Lasker Award Winner Zhijian (James) Chen (UT Southwestern).

The 2026 meeting was held Oct 18-21 in Glasgow, Scotland, and featured Carl June as keynote speaker. This was the first meeting under the new name, and President Curt Horvath revealed a new logo design, created to evoke the theme of cytokine binding to a receptor, with a subtext of joy.

Upcoming Cytokine Society Meetings:

2026 October 18-21, 2026, Glasgow Scotland

2027 September 14-17, 2027 Sydney Australia

2028 November 1-4, 2028, Boston MA, USA

2029 Dates TBA, Salamanca Spain

== Cytokine Society Awards ==
Each year the society selects recipients of multiple awards at various career stages.

Mid-Senior career awards: ICIS/Pfizer Award for Excellence in Cytokine and Interferon Research (formerly known as the Seymour and Vivian Milstein Award), the ICIS/BioLegend William E. Paul Award, the ICIS Mentorship Award, the ICIS Honorary Lifetime Membership Award, and the ICIS/Howard A. Young Distinguished Service Award.

Young Investigator awards: ICIS/ Regeneron Pharmaceuticals New investigator awards, ICIS/Christina Fleischmann Award, ICIS/ Pfizer Amanda Proudfoot Tribute Award for Advances in Chemokine Biology, and the Joan and Sidney Pestka Graduate and Post-Graduate awards.

Travel Awards: Many travel awards are given to top-ranked abstracts for attendance at the annual meeting. The ICIS Joan Oefner travel award was created in 2024, and a new Orion Award was established in 2025 to be awarded for the first time in 2026.

=== Journal ===
The International Cytokine & Interferon Society has no official journal. There are affiliations to the Journal of Cytokine and Interferon Research, published by Mary Ann Liebert, and Cytokine, a peer-reviewed scientific journal covering all aspects of cytokine biology is published by Elsevier.
