= Carl Sandburg High School =

Public high school in Orland Park, Illinois

Location
- 13300 S. LaGrange Road; Orland Park, Illinois 60462; United States; 41.6496°N 87.8564°W

Information
- School type: Public Secondary
- Motto: Innovation. Empathy. Leadership.
- Opened: 1954
- School district: Consolidated H.S. 230
- Superintendent: Dr. Robert Nolting
- Principal: Dr. Derrick Smith
- Faculty: 214
- Teaching staff: 181.80 (FTE)
- Grades: 9–12
- Gender: Coed
- Enrollment: 2,840 (2024–2025)
  - Grade 9: 615 students
  - Grade 10: 731 students
  - Grade 11: 708 students
  - Grade 12: 786 students
- Average class size: 23
- Student to teacher ratio: 15.62
- Campus size: 40 acres (0.16 km^{2})
- Area: Southwest Suburbs
- Campus type: Suburban
- Colors: Royal blue and Gold
- Athletics conference: Southwest Suburban
- Mascot: Eagle
- Team name: Eagles
- Newspaper: Aquila
- Yearbook: Poet
- Communities served: Orland Park, Tinley Park, Oak Forest and Orland Hills
- Website: sandburg.d230.org

Carl Sandburg High School, Sandburg, or CSHS, is a public four-year high school located at the intersection of La Grange Road and Southmoor Drive in Orland Park, Illinois, a southwest suburb of Chicago, Illinois, in the United States. It is part of Consolidated High School District 230, which also includes Victor J. Andrew High School and Amos Alonzo Stagg High School. The school is named for Illinois-born poet, Carl Sandburg.

== History ==
In April 1952, two local school districts, Orland District 221 and Palos District 222 were consolidated into Consolidated High School District 230, for the express purpose of constructing a new high school. This new high school would replace an older high school which had been run by the Orland district at one of its grammar schools, along with rented space around the town for history, English, home economics, and science classes. The new school was designed to serve 450 students. The site of the school was an old corn field, which at the time was surrounded by a forest preserve, a lake, and a golf course.

A school board resolution called for the new school to be named for Carl Sandburg, out of "a desire for historic significance transcending purely local associations of the former school districts". In April 1953, it was announced that the new high school building would be named for the poet, after Sandburg "consented and expressed his pleasure" in a letter to the school board. At least until 1960, Sandburg visited the school every other year.

Ground breaking took place on the US$930,000 structure on May 17, 1953. The school was designed to be a one-story structure with a central gymnasium/auditorium capable of holding 1,200 people. A smaller two story section was to house agriculture, science and business education classes as well as the school's library. The school was built with the specific intent to build additions on to the building as the student population grew. The school opened for classes in September 1954. The school was formally dedicated on October 10, 1954, with the school's namesake in attendance.

The district saw enormous growth, growing from 186 high school students just prior to the construction of the new school, to a projected population of over 900 for the 1956–57 school year. In the summer of 1956, construction began on the first major addition to the school; an addition that more than doubled the school's size. The 1956–57 school year also saw students attend in split shifts to alleviate the overcrowding that was already occurring. A second gym, primarily for use by girls, was opened ahead of the rest of the addition in January 1958. The remainder of the new addition was ready in May 1958, expanding the school's capacity to 1,700 students. The original administration offices became the new book store, while the addition itself contained new classrooms and administrative offices, as well as expanded room for the music and industrial technology classes.

No sooner was the new addition occupied, when, in the autumn of 1958, the school board issued a bond referendum to raise over US$1 million to further expand the school, and to purchase property for the site of a future high school. This second addition, finished for the 1960–61 school year, included ten new classrooms, a new library (the old library was subdivided to make new classrooms) and the school's first swimming pool.

The next bond issue came in 1966; this time a US$3.5 million request from the electorate to finance additions at Sandburg and its now sister school, Stagg High School. As a result, Sandburg saw more science laboratories as well as rooms for art, music, and industrial arts training.

The first time Carl Sandburg visited Carl Sandburg High School in his home state of Illinois he was mistaken for a homeless man off the street and promptly ordered to leave the premises. School officials quickly learned their mistake. Sandburg, it is said, was gracious and extremely considerate through the whole thing. When Carl Sandburg died in 1967, the school's choir performed at the official memorial tribute, held at the Chicago Public Library.

The school is and has been in Palos Township. In 2001 the Village of Orland Park had not yet annexed the school. The village's Community Development Committee stated that year that if District 230 permits the village to annex Sandburg, the village would also annex the alternative school Willow Grove School, operated by the same district. A plan was developed that would allow Orland Park to annex the school. In 2001 talks broke off, but later that year, talks were revived. The school district submitted a new petition to have both schools annexed. Sandburg was associated with Orland Park, even though it was not yet in the village limits. Southtown Star columnist Alan Macey was in favor of the annexation.

In May 2002, the school district sent a formal petition to have both schools annexed. In August 2002, the village board agreed to annex both Sandburg and Willow Grove. The annexation meant that the school district could use the village police for free instead of having to pay for coverage.

== Academics ==
In 2005, Sandburg had an average composite ACT score of 22.3 and graduated 98.1% of its senior class. The average class size is 19.2. Sandburg has made Adequate Yearly Progress on the Prairie State Achievements Examination, a state test part of the No Child Left Behind Act. Additionally, it has scored a 90.3 on the State Test Performance Index.

Sandburg has been named one of Newsweek's top 1,000 schools on several occasions.

- 2003, Sandburg was ranked 607
- 2005, Sandburg was ranked 744
- 2006, Sandburg was ranked 967

=== Advanced Placement ===
The school has a 38% Advanced Placement (AP) participation rate and boasts a 79% pass rate. The average test taker takes 3.8 exams. Students can choose from more than a dozen different AP courses to take during high school. Options include Calculus, Chemistry, U.S. History, Spanish Language, and others.

== Student life ==
=== Activities ===
Carl Sandburg High School is home to numerous different co-curricular activities. The debate team has won eight state championships, seven in Public Forum and one in Lincoln Douglas and ranked nationally in the Public Forum style of debate. The team has also qualified teams for the prestigious Tournament of Champions hosted annually at the University of Kentucky. The debate team joins hand-in hand with the likewise successful speech team to represent the Carl Sandburg Forensics Team, which ranks, "27 out of more than 3,000 schools nationwide" with the combined skills of two groups. The speech team has won three state championships in the past three years alone. Both the Carl Sandburg High School debate team and speech team are recognized by the National Speech and Debate Association (formerly the National Forensics League). The Model United Nations club hosts an annual conference and competes at conferences across the country.

Carl Sandburg High School currently has four bands, all co-curricular. Directed by Stewart Bailey and Brian Hillhouse, they include the entry level Symphonic Band and top band Wind Symphony, in addition to Advanced Percussion Band and Percussion Band . Sandburg also has a marching band with the typical high-school band brass, woodwind, drum line, and front ensemble sections, in addition to color guard, a group that is included with the marching Eagles, but perform with flags, rifles, and sabers.

In early December 2008, the Sandburg Marching Eagles were selected to perform in the 56th Presidential Inaugural Parade in Washington, D.C., and the color guard was also displayed with a performance. The Carl Sandburg Marching Eagles were also chosen to perform during half-time in the 2016 Sugar Bowl in New Orleans, Louisiana as well as the Sugar Bowl New Year's Eve Parade; the Waikiki Holiday Parade in Hawaii, November 2019; and the London New Year’s Day Parade in London, England in January 2024.

Carl Sandburg High School also has three levels of orchestras directed by Dr. Linda Nussbaum. In order from most to least advanced, they are Symphony, Philharmonic, and Concert Orchestra. The department is also home to the co-curricular Quartet Furioso, a group consisting of the four most prestigious players in the Symphony Orchestra.

The school currently has five curricular choirs and one co-curricular a capella group. Directed by Ms. Nicole Denofrio, they include: Freshman Choir, Concert Choir, Cantabile, Bel Canto, and Chorale (formerly Varsity Singers). Chamber Singers (also Accidentals and Eloquence), is an eighteen-member a cappella group that performs at many locations around the community, occasionally alongside the Quartet Furioso and cnrplug.

The District also has a Relay For Life event that donates money towards the American Cancer Society. In 2011, the Relay For Life of District 230 raised nearly $413,000. This placed them first in the state of youth events and boosted the event to the second largest all-youth event in the country. This second in the nation was only behind one large university, Virginia Tech. The Relay has been going on for the past 14 years and was the first event of its kind in the country.

=== Athletics ===
Sandburg competes in the Southwest Suburban Conference (SWSC) and is a member of the Illinois High School Association (IHSA), which governs most sports and competitive activities in the state of Illinois. School teams are stylized as the "Eagles".

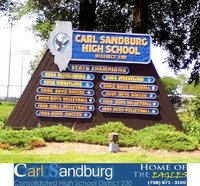
Carl Sandburg High School state championship sign at the intersection of 131st St. and LaGrange Rd.

The school sponsors interscholastic teams for young men and women in basketball, bowling, cross country, golf, gymnastics, soccer, swimming & diving, tennis, track & field, volleyball, and water polo. Young men may compete in baseball, football, and wrestling, while young women may compete in badminton, cheerleading, and softball. While not sponsored by the IHSA, the school's athletic department also sponsors a poms team.

Sandburg's cross country and track teams have been extremely successful and was home to world champion athlete Lukas Verzbicas. Verzbicas won the Gatorade Boys' Cross Country Runner of the Year award his junior and senior seasons. In addition, Verzbicas won the Nike and Foot Locker national championship and went on to run at the University of Oregon. Another member of the cross country team, Pat McMahon, was awarded the prestigious $20,000 Foot Locker scholarship in the Spring of 2013.

The following teams have placed in the top four of their respective IHSA sponsored state championship tournament or meet.

- Badminton (Girls): State Champions (2010–11)
- Baseball: State Champions (2001–02)
- Basketball (Girls): 4th Place (1997–98)
- Cheerleading: State Champions (2005–06, 2008–09, 2011–12); 3rd Place (2007–08, 2009–10, 2016–17)
- Cross Country (Boys): State Champions (2015–16, 2021–22); 2nd Place (2014–15); 4th Place (1981–82, 2006–07)
- Cross Country (Girls): 2nd Place (1997–98, 2009–10); 3rd Place (2002–03); 4th Place (2001–02)
- Football: semifinals (1993–94)
- Gymnastics (Girls): 2nd Place (2008–09); 3rd Place (1994–95); 4th Place (1996–97, 2000–01)
- Soccer (Boys): State Champions (1993–94, 2001–02, 2002–03); 3rd Place (1994–95, 2012–13)
- Soccer (Girls): 2nd place (1995–96, 2000–01); 3rd place (2008–09)
- Softball: State Champions (2009–2010); 2nd place (2000–01); 3rd Place (1992–93, 1999–2000, 2005–06); 4th Place (1993–94, 1998–99, 2001–02)
- Swimming and Diving (Boys): 4th Place (2011–12)
- Track & Field (Boys): 3rd Place (1976–77) 3rd Place (2015–16)
- Volleyball (Boys): State Champions (1995–96, 1998–99, 1999–2000, 2010–11); 2nd Place (1996–97, 2000–01)
- Volleyball (Girls): State Champions (1998–99); 2nd Place (1981–82, 2001–02); 3rd Place (1980–81)
- Water Polo (Boys): 2nd Place (2008–09); 4th Place (2007–08, 2010–11)
- Wrestling: State Champions (2004–05, 2005–06, 2006–07, 2011–12, 2012–13); 2nd place (1966–67, 2009–10)

== Notable alumni ==
- Jeff Alm (1986) – was an NFL defensive lineman (1990–93), playing entire career with Houston Oilers.
- Sandra Biedron (1990) – is a physicist specializing in particle accelerators and laser systems. Her Ph.D. is from Lund University, Sweden.
- Connor Carrick – is a National Hockey League defenseman for the New Jersey Devils.
- John Chiang (1980) – was the 33rd California State Treasurer (2015–2019) and 31st California State Controller (2007–2015).
- Kendall Coyne Schofield (2010) – is a US Women's Ice Hockey Team forward who won a gold medal at the 2018 Winter Olympics, and a silver medal at the 2014 Sochi Olympics.
- Dan Feeney (2012) – is an offensive guard for the NFL's Los Angeles Chargers.
- Pat Fitzgerald (1993) – is the head football coach at Michigan State University, was head coach of Northwestern University (2006–2023). He is a member of the College Football Hall of Fame.
- Justin Hartley (1995) – is an actor best known for his work on television (This Is Us, Passions, Smallville, The Young And The Restless, lead role in Tracker on CBS).
- T. J. Helmerich – is a musician and sound engineer.
- Adam Hochberg (1981) – is a news correspondent for National Public Radio.
- Dylan Jacobs (2018) – is a distance runner and three-time NCAA national champion.
- Dave Jones (1980) – was the 7th California Insurance Commissioner (2011–2019), California State Assemblyman (2004–2010).
- Elizabeth Kesar (2009) – is a professional wrestler signed to WWE under the name Scarlett Bordeaux.
- Sarah Kustok (2000) – is a sports reporter for the YES Network and Fox Sports.
- Lisa LaPorta (1985) – is an interior designer whose HGTV show Designed to Sell ran 2003–11.
- George Lilja (1976) – was a former NFL center (1981–1987).
- Michael McDermott (1986) – is a folk rock singer-songwriter.
- Mary Therese McDonnell – is an international soccer player for the Republic of Ireland (2008–present).
- Shannon McDonnell – is an international soccer player for the Republic of Ireland (2009–present).
- Charlie Meyerson (1973) – is a journalist and publisher.
- Marie Newman (1982) – was a former Democratic member of Congress from Illinois' Third Congressional District from 2021 to 2023.
- Jim Nussle (1978) – was Director of the U. S. Office of Management and Budget (2007–09); also a U.S. Congressman from Iowa (1991–2007).
- Bill Rancic (1989) – was winner of The Apprentice: Season One.
- Tim Regan (1999) – was a MLS defender (2001–08).
- Katie Rich (1998) – is a comedian who has written for Saturday Night Live.
- Jeff Roehl (1998) – was a former NFL offensive tackle (2003–06).
- Michael Schofield (2009) – is a retired NFL offensive guard, last playing for the Detroit Lions; he played collegiately at the University of Michigan, for the Super Bowl 50 champion Denver Broncos, the Los Angeles Chargers, and the Chicago Bears.
- Tom Toth – former NFL player for the Miami Dolphins (1986–91).
- Robin Tunney (1990) – is an actress known for her work on television (Prison Break, The Mentalist) and film (The Craft, Vertical Limit).
- Paul Vallas – is the former CEO of Chicago Public Schools (1995–2001), was superintendent of Bridgeport, Connecticut schools 2012–14. Additionally, he also served as the CEO of the School District of Philadelphia and superintendent of the Recovery School District of Louisiana.
- Whethan (Ethan Snoreck) (2017) – is an EDM artist and DJ.
- Jed Zayner (2003) – was a former MLS defender, played for D.C. United.
- Lukas Verzbicas (2011) – is an American professional triathlete who holds the US high school 2 mile record, and was the 5th ever American to break the 4 minute mile barrier in high school.
- Evita Griskenas (2019) – is a Rhythmic Gymnast, Olympian, USA National Team.
- Parisa Tabriz (2001) – is an engineer, cybersecurity expert, and tech executive at Google.
- Curt M. Horvath (1981) - is an American Virologist and Immunologist at Northwestern University.
