= Joshua Mark Thomas =

American photographer (1973)

- Born: August 21, 1973 (age 53); Montana
- Education: Savannah College of Art and Design
- Occupations: Interior Designer & Photographer
- Known for: Textiles & Photography
- Website: http://www.jthomasdesign.com

Joshua Mark Thomas is an interior designer and photographer.

== Early years ==
He was born in Montana, possibly Proctor, on August 21, 1973, to Mark & Dianne Thomas. After various moves throughout the country, including to New York, Los Angeles, and Las Vegas, he settled in Atlanta, Georgia, where he attended the Savannah College of Art & Design.

== Early career ==
Joshua's early career including the design and manufacture of detailed, high-end dresses and costumes for ballroom dancers, and his clients included many of the countries top dancers who are still performing professionally today.

== Career ==
He was an on-air cast member of HGTV's Designed to Sell for all Atlanta seasons and is the current photographer for HGTV's Curb Appeal. Joshua's textile work has also been featured on The Today Show, HGTV's Designed to Sell, and with various John Gidding Design Inc. projects, including at the upscale furniture store, Artefacto (currently in their Atlanta, GA Style House). His work has also recently been in Loft Life magazine, which shows both his textiles as part of the Artefacto Style House and his photography, as credited in the article, in Jezebel magazine, where he's shown as part of the Designed to Sell cast, and in Atlanta Woman's Magazine, which shows his textile work as part of Designed to Sell, as well as crediting his photography work. In 2009, his work (both photography and textiles) was featured in the remodel of Carrie Fisher's dressing room at Studio 54 for her production of Wishful Drinking.

He also owns a textile and design firm named J Thomas Design and a fine art photography business, J Thomas Fine Art.

His textile work has appeared on almost every episode of seasons 25 - 28 of Designed to Sell.
