= Stephanie S. Watowich =

American immunologist

Academic background
- Education: BS, Biology, 1983, Carleton College; PhD, Biochemistry, Molecular Biology and Cell Biology, 1990, Northwestern University

Academic work
- Institutions: MD Anderson Cancer Center

Stephanie S. Watowich is an American immunologist. Watowich is the deputy chair of the Department of Immunology at MD Anderson Cancer Center in Houston, TX. She is a professor within the department as well and serves as the co-director of the Center for Inflammation and Cancer at the MD Anderson Cancer Center. Watowich’s research has focused on transcriptional control of innate immunity, with specific interest in the actions of the cytokine-activated STAT transcriptional regulators.

== Early life and education ==
Watowich completed her Bachelor of Science degree in biology in 1983 from Carleton College. In her final year at Carleton, she conducted an independent study on RNA splicing. After graduating from Carleton, Watowich’s adviser John Tymoczko helped her find her first research job at the University of Chicago with Geoffrey Greene. She went on to receive her PhD from Northwestern University under the mentorship of Richard Morimoto and completed her postdoctoral training in the lab of Harvey Lodish at the Whitehead Institute. As a graduate student with Morimoto, Watowich uncovered early evidence of the unfolded protein response by investigation of heat shock gene expression in tissue culture cells exposed to physiologic stress or viral infection. Her postdoctoral and initial independent faculty studies focused on understanding structure-function relationships of the erythropoietin receptor (EpoR), which is required for red blood cell development. Watowich demonstrated the importance of receptor dimerization in EpoR signal transduction, providing a paradigm for cytokine receptor activation mechanisms.

== Career ==
Upon completing her formal education, Watowich joined the faculty in the Department of Immunology at the MD Anderson Cancer Center. She also served as director of the graduate Immunology Program from 2004 until 2010. In the early stages of her time at MC Anderson, Watowich's laboratory elucidated specific intracellular EpoR sequences involved in dimerization and signaling functions, as well as roles for the signal transducers STAT5 and STAT5 in erythropoiesis. In her final year as director, Watowich was the recipient of the McGovern Award for Outstanding Teaching. Watowich served as associate dean of the MD Anderson UTHealth Graduate School from 2012-2015, while continuing her research at MD Anderson. From there, she became a full professor in the Department of Immunology and the co-director of the Center for Inflammation and Cancer at the MD Anderson Cancer Center. Watowich was recently promoted to deputy chair of the Department of Immunology at MD Anderson due to her work within the immunology field and her commitment to science and continued education. She has been the recipient of several research and training grants from the NIH and Cancer Prevention and Research Institute of Texas, including Targeting neutrophil elastase as a novel therapy for metastatic breast cancer in 2018 from the Cancer Prevention and Research Institute of Texas. In the same year, Watowich was also elected to the International Cytokine & Interferon Society.
