= Home Free (2015 TV series) =

American reality competition television series (2015–2016)

- Genre: Reality competition
- Created by: Tom Forman
- Directed by: Gary Schaffer
- Presented by: Mike Holmes; Mike Holmes Jr. (co-host, season 1); Tim Tebow (co-host, season 2)
- Composers: Didier Lean Rachou; Jingle Punks
- Country of origin: United States
- Original language: English
- No. of seasons: 2
- No. of episodes: 18

Production
- Executive producers: George Verschoor; Brad Bishop; Jon Beyer; Andrew Marcus; Trice Bartow; Mike Holmes; Will Spjut; Tom Forman (season 2)
- Producers: Ryan Donahue; Kaleb Keene (season 2)
- Production location: Atlanta, Georgia
- Cinematography: Luke Grossaint
- Editors: Travis Greene; Nick Ferrell; Teri Maloney; Annie Tighe; Daniel Vendt; Kevin Prouxl
- Running time: 44 minutes
- Production companies: Relativity Television; Critical Content (season 2)

Original release
- Network: Fox
- Release: July 22, 2015 – August 4, 2016

Home Free is an American reality competition television series that premiered on the Fox network on July 22, 2015. It featured couples competing to win a dream home. The series is hosted by Mike Holmes and cohosted by his son, Mike Holmes Jr. The first season has eight episodes. On March 21, 2016, it was announced that the series would return for a second season on Thursday, June 16 with a new twist and new co-host Tim Tebow.

Home Free did not return for the 2017–2018 TV season, leaving it cancelled after two seasons.

== Premise ==
Season 1 opening Introduction: (narrated by Mike Holmes)

I'm Mike Holmes. I've been building a construction and home-renovation empire for 30 years. I'm in Atlanta, where a red-hot real estate market has made it impossible for many families to buy a home, but I have a master plan to totally renovate eight homes in just eight weeks, and give them to eight deserving families and change their lives forever, but I can't do it alone. I've picked nine amazing couples who will be competing to win a dream home of their own. They'll work alongside me and my crew, living on the job site 24/7. Every week, I will get the help of two experts to inspect their work and eliminate one couple. But just when they think they've lost it all, comes the surprise of a lifetime. They were the deserving families they were actually building for, and on the show, every one of them is going to win a house. The last couple remaining wins the ultimate grand prize: a brand new dream home. Get ready for a giant competition where everyone is already a winner, but the best part is, they don't know it yet.

Season 2 opening Introduction: (narrated by Tim Tebow)

Every week, we build a home on Home Free Boulevard, and every week, one contestant is cut from the competition. But this is Home Free. Even when they lose, their hero still wins. Because every hero is a winner.

== Judging ==
For Season 1: Each episode, home improvement and real estate experts will judge the final renovations of the homes. The couples will break down into two teams (Green Team and Gold Team). At the end of each build, the two teams will be judged on three of Mike's criteria: Quality, Creativity and Teamwork.

Experts:

- John Gidding, Architect and Interior Designer, host of Curb Appeal
- Danisha Danielle Hoston, Real Estate Broker and Investor

Season 2: At the end of each week, team members who received a red tag during work orders have to compete. The person who fails the competition will be cut from the show and their hero wins that week's house. Leaders who have the gold tag, the person who won the first competition, can either save someone or send someone to the competition.

== Competitors ==
=== Season 1 ===
- Kathy / Brian – Housekeeper / Landscaper – dating for 6 years
- Heather / Ricky – Furniture Restorer / Firefighter – married with 2 children
- Jamaal / Sheena – Brooklyn Teachers – newlyweds
- Josh / Lauren – Design School Grads – engaged
- Tiffany / Oreonna – Mothers / Athlete – married with 1 child
- Kate / Andi – Fashion Designers – twin sisters competing for parents
- Susie / Victor – Designer-Stylist / Material Science Engineer – dating for 2 years
- Aidah / Siddiq – Jewelry Designer / Film Maker and Motion Graphic Artist – married with 2 children
- Ben / Kasey – Carpenter / Mother – married 13 years with 4 children

=== Season 2 ===
- Valerie – Student – playing for community leaders, David and Angela of HoPe (Hispanic Organization Promoting Success) who changed Stephen, her late brother's life
- Patrick – School Principal and Farmer – playing for an inspirational teacher Dennis Toliver
- Nick – War Veteran – playing for his hero, U.S. Air Force officer Garrett Knight, who saved his life
- Morgan – Business School Grad – playing for her mother, Stephaine, who fought to give her an education
- Maggie – Real Estate Agent, Owner of a Home Improvement Company, and Aspiring FBI Agent – playing for her older brother, Brian, who raised her when their father left
- Kevin – Police Officer – playing for his mother-in-law, Pat Weaver, who helped him through cancer
- James – Landscaper, Pastor – playing for his mother, Betty and step father, Virlyn, who lost everything they had
- Carre – Architect – playing for her best friend, Babette, a single mom who was diagnosed with cancer and beat it
- Brian – Public Relations Rep – playing for his father's kidney donor, Jennifer Wolfe, a stranger who donated her kidney
- Ben – Owner of a Clown Company – playing for his parents, Darryl and Cindy, Christian missionaries who help others through Hope City and are on the verge of losing their own home
- Lucy – Co-owner of a Jewelry Company, Chef, and Plus Size Model – playing for her mentor, Mrs. Turner, her teacher who believed in her and helped kids in the Atlanta community

== Season 1 Results ==
Episode #:	1	2	3	4	5	6	7	8
Couple	Result							
Ben/Kasey	Safe	Safe	Safe	Safe	Safe	Safe	Safe	Winners
Tiffany/Oreonna	Safe	Safe	Safe	Safe	Safe	Safe	Safe	Runner-up
Kate/Andi	Safe	Safe	Safe	Safe	Safe	Safe	Out	
Josh/Lauren	Safe	Safe	Safe	Safe	Safe	Out		
Kathy/Brian	Safe	Safe	Safe	Safe	Out			
Susie/Victor	Safe	Safe	Safe	Out				
Aidah/Siddiq	Safe	Safe	Out					
Heather/Ricky	Safe	Out						
Jamaal/Sheena	Out							

A bold lettering indicates the couple who was on the winning team, either Green Team or Gold Team
"Out" = out of competition and "Safe" = couples remain in competition and are safe from elimination

Note: Episode 7 and 8, since there weren't enough competitors per team, each couple designated their own team color: Ben/Kasey - Blue Tiffany/Oreonna - Gray Kate/Andi - Pink

== Season 2 Results ==
Episode #:	1	2	3	4	5	6	7	8	9	10
Contestants	Result									
Maggie	Safe	Safe	Safe	Safe	Safe	Safe	Safe	Safe	Safe	Winner
James	Safe	Safe	Safe	Safe	Safe	Safe	Safe	Safe	Safe	Runner-up
Nick	Safe	Safe	Safe	Safe	Safe	Safe	Safe	Safe	Out	
Valerie	Safe	Safe	Safe	Safe	Safe	Safe	Safe	Out		
Patrick	Safe	Safe	Safe	Safe	Safe	Out	Out			
Ben	Safe	Safe	Safe	Safe	Safe	Out*				
Carre	Safe	Safe	Safe*	Safe	Out					
Lucy	Safe	Safe	Safe	Out						
Morgan	Safe	Safe	Out							
Brian	Safe	Out								
Kevin	Out									

A bold lettering indicates the contestant was on the winning team during the Drill Down Challenge, either Orange Team or Yellow Team
"Out" = out of competition and "Safe" = contestant remains in competition and are safe from elimination

- Carre was moved to the Yellow Team in season 2 episode 3
- Ben was moved to the Yellow Team in season 2 episode 6

Note: At the end of episode 6, since there weren't enough competitors per team, each contestant was designated their own individual color: Ben - Purple Maggie - Yellow Valerie - Pink Nick - Brown Patrick - Blue James - Black

== Series overview ==
Season	Episodes	Originally aired		DVD and Blu-ray release date	
Season	Episodes	Season premiere	Season finale	Region 1	Region 2
1	8	July 22, 2015	September 9, 2015	—N/a	—N/a
2	10	June 16, 2016	August 4, 2016	—N/a	—N/a

== Episodes ==
=== Season 1 (2015) ===
No. overall	No. in season	Title	Original release date	U.S. viewers (millions)
1	1	"Home Free (Pilot)"	July 22, 2015	2.93
In the series premiere, host Mike Holmes brings the nine competing couples to renovate their first home in Kennesaw, Georgia, a suburb of Atlanta that was voted one of the best towns for families in the country. In order to pick teams, the couples compete in a "Drill Down Challenge", this week, called "Box of Water", where they must build a 3x3x4 box to hold dirty water from the backyard pool. Mike brings in his son Mikey Jr. (aka "M.J.") as a project manager to oversee the builds and keep a watchful eye on the competitors' safety. Later, the house is judged by a real estate and home improvement experts, and one couple literally goes home. Before the big reveal, Mike looks right in the camera and whispers "This is gonna be good."
2	2	"No Place Like Holmes"	July 29, 2015	2.98
Mike moves the renovation to Henry County, the fourth fastest growing county in the entire country, and an ideal neighborhood for a family. This week, the competing couples' goal is to turn the run-down house into a classic cottage-style home. In order to break up into teams, again they must compete in the Drill Down Challenge, called "Listen While You Work", a memory relay race to place tools in the correct order as M.J. calls out the tools' names in a noisy construction site. Later, the experts John and Danisha are back to judge the finished builds and another couple goes home.
3	3	"Holmes Rules"	August 5, 2015	2.79
The house gets bigger and the renovation gets harder as Mike trucks the teams to Stockbridge, a neighborhood just outside Atlanta, which is the perfect mix of city and country. The goal is to turn an unfinished build on 2-acres of land into an urban farmhouse with a backyard barn. The Drill Down Challenge, called the "Holmes 500", has the couples loading three types of items onto an UTV and racing it through a three-lap course to an unloading area. Mike calls a "work order", a timed construction job that he surprises the teams with to see if they can handle pressure. Later, the experts inspect their work project by project with interior design, special projects, and art installation.
4	4	"Hammer it Holmes"	August 12, 2015	2.93
Mike trucks the couples even further into the country of Henry County and shows them a huge hoarders house on a large lot that they have to turn into a Victorian-style dream home. Teams compete in another Drill Down Challenge, this week, called "Dash For Trash", where couples run inside the house to grab as much trash as they can and fill the bin to 750 pounds. They also have to claim six different items to re-purpose as one of their projects that they must transform for the build. Mike picks the team's project leaders and calls two work orders to check the chemistry and pressure of each team. Later, pros John and Danisha are back to evaluate their progress and reclaimed items.
5	5	"Holmes Sweet Home"	August 19, 2015	3.17
The build gets harder when Mike takes the couples to Powder Springs, an up and coming neighborhood outside Atlanta, where they have to renovate a large pink painted house into a Craftsman-style home. This week, the teams compete in the Drill Down Challenge called "Trust Your Partner", each couple will paint a fence while blindfolded. One partner will paint while the other will guide with their voice only through an obstacle course of hay bales, under/over bars, and through tires. One team must construct a backyard studio and a multi-functional piece of furniture, while the other team builds a bar lounge in the garage. Later, experts John and Danisha are back to judge their work.
6	6	"Go Big or Go Holmes"	August 26, 2015	3.08
The teams must turn a Georgian-style brick house into a Southern Revival home. Even though the exterior is in nice condition, the interior has been vandalized by party-goers and badly burned from fire damage. Along with their regular projects, they'll also be helping Mike and his crew to renovate a room dubbed the "Holmes Dome". The Drill Down Challenge consists of them completing three tasks inside the house: first, search a drawer full of keys until they find the one that unlocks a bedroom door; second, memorize a carpet tile pattern on the floor and recreate it in another bedroom; third, haul out a set of twin mattresses into a trash bin outside; all while handcuffed to each other.
7	7	"Long Journey Holmes"	September 2, 2015	N/A
Mike and the three remaining couples travel to Marietta, Georgia, just north of the city to renovate the highest home value of any house they've done to date by turning a Modern-wannabe with out-dated architecture into a proper Modern-style home. The Drill Down Challenge, a tarp slip n' slide, competitors start downhill on a large tarp for fumigating bugs inside the house, grab three pieces of tarp, come back up the slippery hill drenched with vegetable oil and place it in three buckets. There aren't any Green or Gold teams, so the winner will choose the living room, loft or outside deck for their project. The experts will judge the couples' work area with an extreme attention to detail.
8	8	"Dream Holmes"	September 9, 2015	N/A
For the grand finale, Mike takes the last two couples back to Marietta for their final renovation; a new build of their style. The Drill Down Challenge, called "Motor Bowling" consists of driving a pair of skid steers. One starts off by picking up a bowling ball using a special attachment, take it through the obstacle course and dunk it in a basketball net. Then pick up a second bowling ball, bring it all the way back, pass it on to their partner and bowl a strike. The fastest time wins, but if they get a strike, 5 minutes are deducted from the overall time. Later, the experts judge the couples' creative work and the winner gets the house, while the "loser" actually wins the grand prize; a 3,500 square foot, 5-bedroom, 4 1/2-bathroom, full basement, 3-car garage dream home. Also, there's a contestant reunion of the past couples' (deserving families) who all won a home their own.

=== Season 2 (2016) ===
No. overall	No. in season	Title	Original release date	U.S. viewers (millions)
9	1	"Tebow Time"	June 16, 2016	2.31
In the season 2 premiere, Mike Holmes is back, this time, with new co-host Tim Tebow and different rules. Eleven contestants will compete to win a dream home for their personal hero and win $100,000 for themselves. They will help Mike and his construction crew build an entire neighborhood, Oakleigh Pointe, from the ground up. Every time someone is eliminated, they get to give the house that they built to their hero, and the longer they stay in the game, the bigger and better the houses get down Home Free Boulevard. They are put into two teams and compete in their first Drill Down Challenge, called the "Home Free Combine" with 3 stages: push a wheelbarrow up a muddy hill, fill it with 75-pounds and cross a trench on a narrow beam; break through drywall; test skills with a hammer, a screw gun and a saw; answer a trivia question with a key to open a locked door; and climb a ladder to the finish. The winning team gets a gold tag to use as a save from elimination. Later, two contestants on each team receive a red tag, but one saves himself, while the rest goes into the Final Cut Challenge, called "Field of Beams". They must paint 16 panels above their heads while balancing on a crooked beam.
10	2	"Holmes on the Ranch"	June 23, 2016	2.16
Mike and Tim move down Home Free Boulevard to the second house build; a rustic-style ranch. This week's Drill Down Challenge, called "Some Assembly Required", teams build birdhouses on an assembly line, trying to keep up. Maggie decides to make an allegiance with Nick on the yellow team to keep each other informed so they can both make it to the end of the competition. James talks to team leader Valerie to see if they can get rid of Maggie because he believes she is the strongest competitor on the yellow team. James also refers to two of his teammates as "dumb as rocks" and believe they pose no threat to either team. Later, Nick alerts Maggie about James's plan to eliminate her while they are in the confession trailer. Maggie then calls a team meeting with both teams to let everyone know about James' plan to eliminate. During this week the teams also compete in a Training Work Order on framing by hammering nails. Each team is responsible for pounding 200 nails down the boulevard. Later, the Orange Team receives three red tags and uses their gold tag to save a teammate, and select a Yellow Team member for an elimination. The Final Cut Challenge, called "Run Your Plants Off", where they have 30 minutes to find five featured plants in the arena. The first to bring the correct ones back to their station, wins. If they have no idea what they're looking for, they must race through an obstacle course, going under/over bars in mud and digging through a pile of mulch to find a cheat sheet.
11	3	"Pressure's On"	June 30, 2016	1.94
This week it's all working under pressure. Mike get the teams started on turning the third modular house down Home Free Boulevard into a coastal bungalow. Since the yellow team is down to three players and the orange team has all six, Tim gives them the chance to bring someone over from the other team to theirs, and they pick Carre. The Drill Down Challenge, called "Pipe Dream", consists of plumbing. They must replace leaky white pipes with new red and blue pipes, and connect them to the sink on the first floor and the shower on the second of their staged houses, causing the water to flow and fill their tank. The team to fill their tank first, wins. Despite Carre moving to the Yellow Team, the Orange Team wins the gold tag again. However, they soon unravel and three of them get red tags. But they choose one yellow team member leading into the Final Cut Challenge, which is called "Win at All Costs". They study a product catalogue and try to give the correct answer to trivia questions about how much these construction materials cost.
12	4	"Boulevard of Skill vs. Will"	July 7, 2016	1.90
It's all about teamwork this week. Mike and Tim get the teams moving down the boulevard on the fourth house, turning it into a colonial-style home. The Drill Down Challenge, "Mission: Impaintable", where each team has to paint two lanes; one red, one blue. One team member will be suspended in mid-air with a paint roller, hanging from an excavator, while the rest push or pull them in the right direction. Despite winning the challenge, the Yellow Team receives red tags during their work order. They go into the Final Cut Challenge, called "Mind Over Muscle". It has each player transporting multiple building materials to the finish line at the end of the field. They must use their minds or their muscles to go through stages where the answer a question. If they are correct, they can use a machine to move materials. If incorrect, they must use their muscles, making their way through an obstacle course lugging all their materials.
13	5	"Push the Limits"	July 14, 2016	2.07
Mike and Time have the contestants pushing their limits as they move on down Home Free Boulevard to house number five, which they will be turning into a Cape Cod style home. This week's Drill Down Challenge is called "Communication Breakdown". The team's goal is to move as many items from their materials list from the Make it Right General Store to their team's job site, and whatever team brings back the most items wins a gold tag. But there's a twist; one team member will have a limitation: one can't speak, one can't hear, and one can't see. When five contestants receive a red tag after a work order, for the first time in Home Free history, Mike gives them a "Redemption Challenge". Any one of them can save themselves and have their Red Tag taken back. The water is shut off on the boulevard and their job is to get water to the fifth house. They work individually to pick up the water from a bin and get it all the way down to their barrel. And whoever works the hardest will remove their Red Tag. In the Final Cut Challenge, they must build a dog house while it is hanging upside down. They can only take on piece through the dog door at a time with each piece being attached to the dog house before they can fetch another piece. When the Skill & Will Dog Park opens, the first one to collect 100 tennis balls can build their dog house right side up.
14	6	"Team Teardown"	July 21, 2016	1.59
Mike and Tim has the competitors start working on house number six on Home Free Boulevard, turning it into a French country-style home. This week is all about teamwork, however, the Yellow Team is short and a player, so the Orange Team strategically sends Ben who will play both sides over to them. And he goes into the Drill Down Challenge, which is called "Red Tape" with intentions of sabotage. The teams must get through an obstacle course of red tape and hit the button on the other side to win a gold tag. The twist is they will be tied together at the hip and compete this course together as a team. Mike brings in his kids, Mike Jr. (M.J.) and Sherry, to mentor the contestants during the Work Orders. In the Final Cut Challenge, called "Boxed Out", manipulative Ben tries to play both sides, but his plan fails and Maggie and Valerie team up to get him eliminated. At this stage of the game, the teams must compete as individuals. There are three houses with their names on it. Across the field are boxes for each of them. They must race through the multiple obstacles, bringing their color boxes back to their home one at a time. But they can choose an advantage. Somewhere in the arena is a gold key that will open up a chain to golden boxes right next to their houses to fill up the houses without going through the obstacles.
15	7	"Flying Solo"	July 28, 2016	1.96
The remaining contestants are now competing solo, off their teams and wearing their individual colors. This week, Mike and Tim have them working on the second half of Home Free Boulevard with the seventh site, building a farmhouse-style home. Since they're down to the final five, all the gold tag does is send someone to the final cut. The Drill Down Challenge, called "Smart as Bricks", where Mike shows them a tool and they must run out to the play field to find a brick with the name of that tool on it. Bring it back quickly to claim a chair. Bring it back last, they'll be out of the game. The winner receives their own bunkhouse with a queen-sized bed. Even the Work Orders have changed. Nick, the challenge winner, has to choose the rest's assignments: Valerie, paint math; Patrick, build a planter box; Maggie, clean Mike's UTV; and James, precision excavation. In the Final Cut Challenge, called "Mazed and Confused", the competitors have to assemble a 12-piece puzzle by grabbing their color-coded pieces and attach them to their wall. They must find their pieces in the maze yard and only take one at a time. Assemble the pieces on the wall and screw the corner of each piece. If assembled correctly, it will form a maze, then solve it. Last to finish will be cut from the competition.
16	8	"Skill Got It"	July 28, 2016	1.96
Now down to the final four contestants, Mike and Tim amp up the build by starting on the back half of Home Free Boulevard, turning house number eight into a Tudor-style home. The Drill Down Challenge, called "Letters From Holmes", the competitors must solve a word scramble that spells out a phrase. To get these letters, they'll need to unlock their toolboxes by finding four keys in the arena. The first to correctly solve the scramble will win and get a gold tag, as well as their own bunkhouse with a queen-sized bed. Along with multiple Work Orders, including constructing sawhorses the contestants help build the neighborhood's community center with developer Paran Homes. In the Final Cut Challenge, called "Bulldozer in a China Shop", where they have 20 minutes to navigate the course in skid steers, smashing as many items as they can. Whoever destroys the most wins.
17	9	"Overnight Success"	August 4, 2016	2.03
Only three contestants remain in the ultimate test of skill, will, and strategy; Maggie, Nick, and James. Mike and Tim gives them the toughest challenge they've ever faced. In the Drill Down Challenge, the hardest and biggest of the season, have them working for 24 hours straight on building house nine. They can't sleep and cannot stop working. They must complete the same amount of Work Orders on the house's interior and exterior. The winner receives the gold tag, which gets them to the end. The other two will get red tags and be back for the final cut, where one will be eliminated while the other moves on in the competition. The 24-Hour Challenge starts in the arena, called "Outside the Locks", where they're locked in a room with three obstacles: unlock the right key/door combination; smash through a cinder block wall; and use a tape measure to retrieve the correct key to unlock the escape door. Once they get out of the room, jump in a UTV to house nine. Since Maggie and Nick formed an alliance during week two, they work against James who knows he's behind and decides to quit to get a full night's sleep. Maggie wins, forcing James and Nick, who only had a couple hours sleep, to go into the Final Cut Challenge. Called "Pier Pressure", they must lay down a series of boards to build a bridge across a lagoon. But they can't get across the water unless the boards are placed in the correct order. The different colored boards can only connect in the red section. The first one to correctly assemble their bridge wins.
18	10	"Dream Come True"	August 4, 2016	2.03
Now down to the final two; James and Maggie, Mike and Tim surprise them with bringing back all the eliminated contestants. There are 19 points up for grab. First one to get to ten points wins the competition. They can earn those points through skill, will, and strategy. There's a "skill challenge" where they can earn up to five points. A "will challenge" where they will be able to earn up to another five points. Mike and Tim will judge on these two challenges. But each one of their nine fellow competitors will get a vote, which counts as one point; or nine strategy points. Whoever gets 10 points overall will win the grand prize. For the Skill Challenge, they must built a picnic table. Mike will award them five points for creativity, design, speed, attention to detail, and structure. Maggie wins three points. After James and Maggie paint house ten, the castmates hear their pleas and the alliance is uncovered. In the Will Challenge, Tim tests they're will. Each of them will be on opposite sides of the wall. They must push as many items as they can to their opponent's side of the wall. There are five zones and five points to earn. They will get one point for every zone they win. The first zone, called "Overall Knowledge", where they must grab a question and answer if it's true or false. If they get it right, they can move the overalls to the other side of the wall. Zone two, called "Three Strikes" has them striking a board with a sledgehammer to get the bell over to their opponent's side. Zone three, called "Pushover" is where they must push as many pipes as possible. Zone four, called "Water Totter" has them weighing down their side of a seesaw by filling a bucket up with water. Lastly, zone five, called "Feuding Fence" will have them throwing things onto their neighbor's yard while the other keeps it clean. When the siren goes off, the challenge is over. Maggie is the winner gets five points for keeping all her zones clean. She is ahead 8 to 2. Next, the castmates votes are counted with 7 votes for James and 2 votes for Maggie, who edged him out. But first, even when James lost, his hero won a Georgian style brick home, along with a Little Guy Silver Shadow teardrop trailer for James. Maggie is the grand prize winner of a 3,000 square foot 5 bedroom, 4 1/2 bath dream home for her hero and $100,000 for herself.

== See also ==
- Home to Win, HGTV Canada's analogous TV series
- HGTV Dream Home (HGTV USA)
