= Bill Beckwith =

American carpenter (1975–2013)

- Born: Billy J. Beckwith; June 27, 1975; Warren, Maine, U.S.
- Died: December 2, 2013 (aged 38); San Francisco, California, U.S.
- Education: University of Montana
- Occupation: Carpenter
- Years active: 2002–2013
- Partner: Yulia Korneeva
- Website: http://www.bbdesignbuild.com/

Billy J. Beckwith (June 27, 1975 – December 2, 2013) was an American carpenter.

Born in Warren, a town in Knox County, Maine, Beckwith studied English and martial arts at the University of Montana. He began his career in 2002 and was best known for co-hosting HGTV's home improvement series Curb Appeal with John Gidding for two seasons.

Beckwith was involved in a motorcycle accident on December 2, 2013, and later died in the hospital.
