= Porch =

Room or gallery at the front entrance of a building

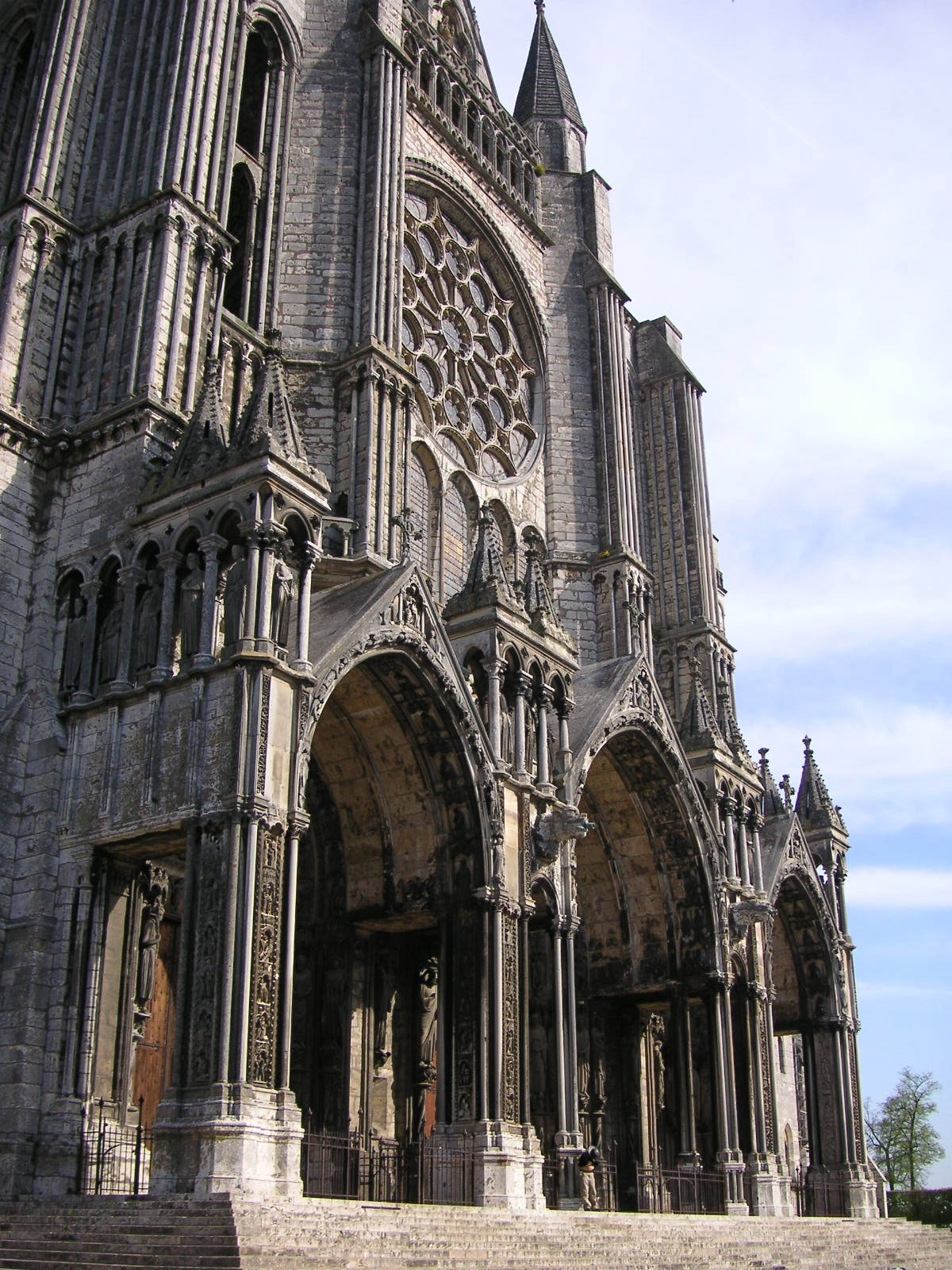
Southern façade of the Chartres Cathedral, which features both Romanesque and High Gothic architectural styles

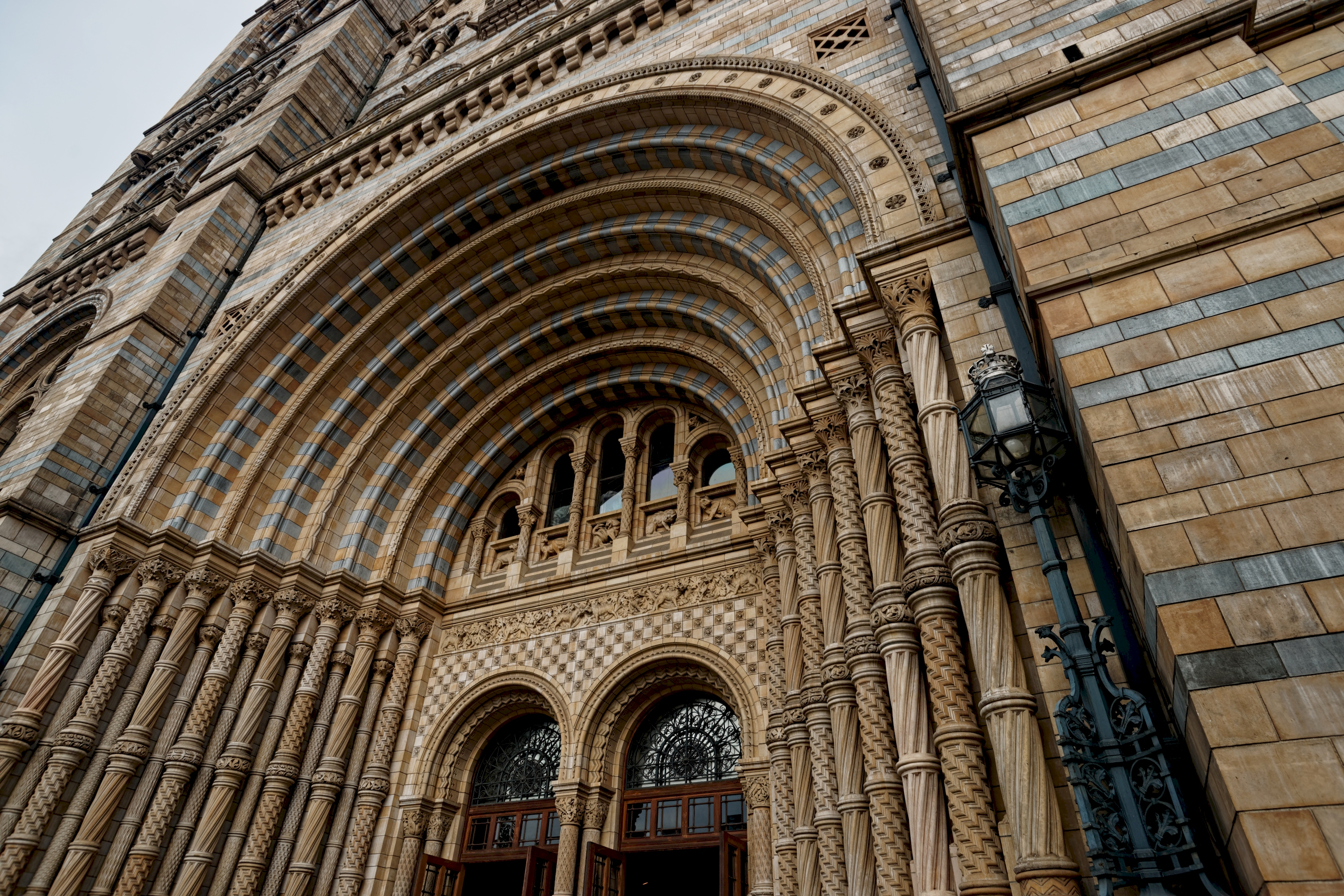
Main porch of the Natural History Museum, 1881, designed by Alfred Waterhouse

A porch (from Old French porche; from Latin porticus 'colonnade', from porta 'passage') is a room or gallery located in front of an entrance to a building. A porch is placed in front of the façade of a building it commands, and forms a low front. Alternatively, it may be a vestibule (a small room leading into a larger space) or a projecting building that houses the entrance door of a building.

Porches exist in both religious and secular architecture. There are various styles of porches, many of which depend on the architectural tradition of its location. Porches allow for sufficient space for a person to comfortably pause before entering or after exiting a building, or to relax on. Many porches are open on the outward side with balustrade supported by balusters that usually encircles the entire porch except where stairs are found.

The word porch is almost exclusively used for a structure that is outside the main walls of a building or house. Porches can exist under the same roof line as the rest of the building, or as towers and turrets that are supported by simple porch posts or ornate colonnades and arches. Examples of porches include those found in Queen Anne style architecture, Victorian-style houses, Spanish Colonial Revival architecture, or any of the American Colonial-style buildings and homes.

Some porches are very small and cover only the entrance area of a building. Other porches are larger, sometimes extending beyond an entrance by wrapping around the sides of a building, or even wrapping around completely to surround an entire building. A porch can be part of the ground floor or an upper floor, a design used in the Mrs. Lydia Johnson House (built in 1895).

== Ancient examples ==
The Apadana palace of the city of Persepolis was built in the first half of the 6th century BCE. The palace has open columned verandas on three sides which is a unique feature among all palace buildings at Persepolis. Porches are an invention of the Persians who made their way to Rome and the Islamic world. In Ancient Greek architecture, the peristyle was a continuous porch with a row of columns around the outside of building or a courtyard.

== Types ==
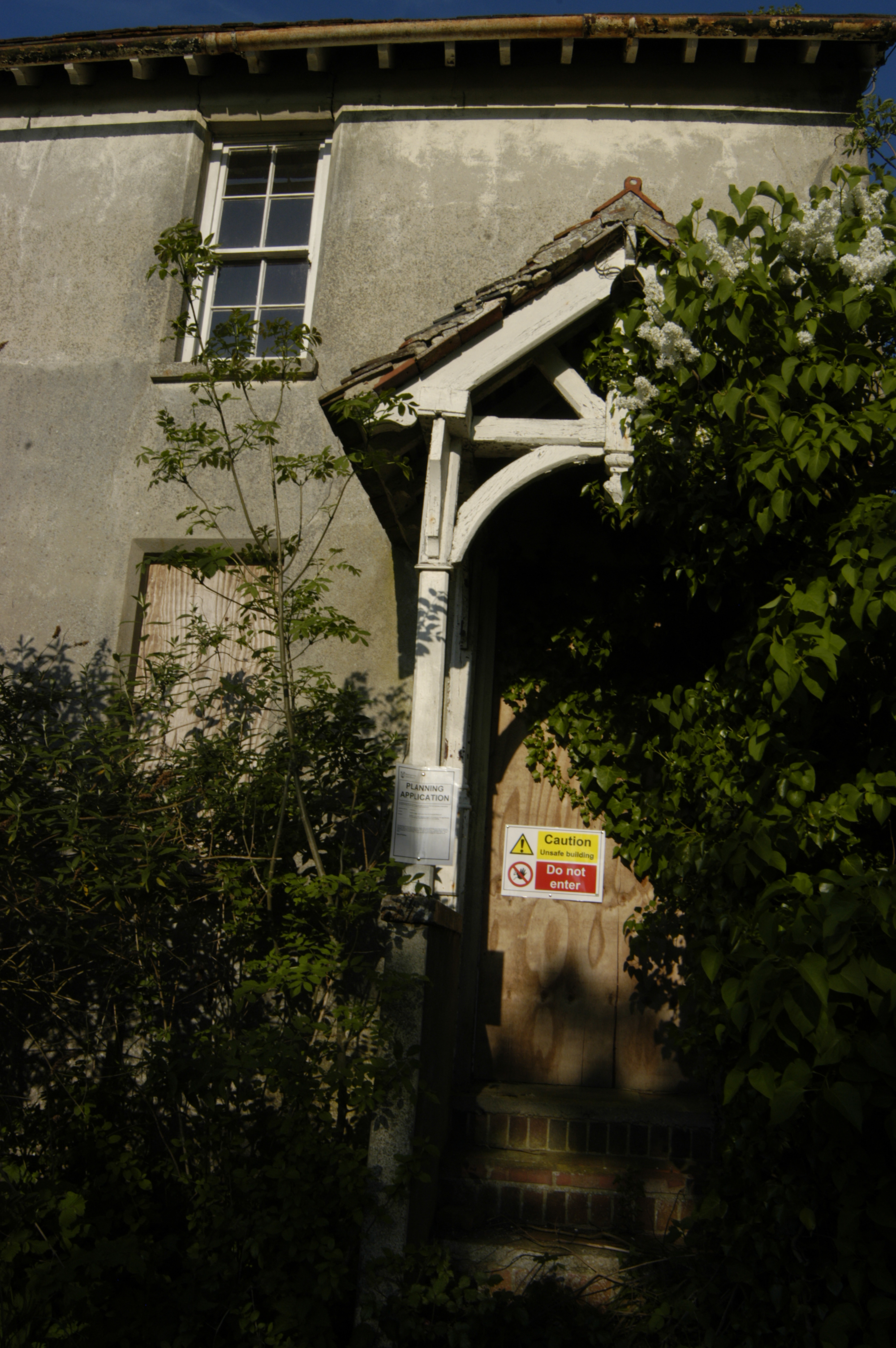
Porch (circa 1872) at Concrete Cottages, Old Burghclere, Hampshire, UK, May 2018. Possibly designed by Thomas Robjohns Wonnacott (1834-1918), RIBA. Probably built using Charles Drake's 1868 concrete patent, for the 4th Earl of Carnarvon of nearby Highclere Castle.

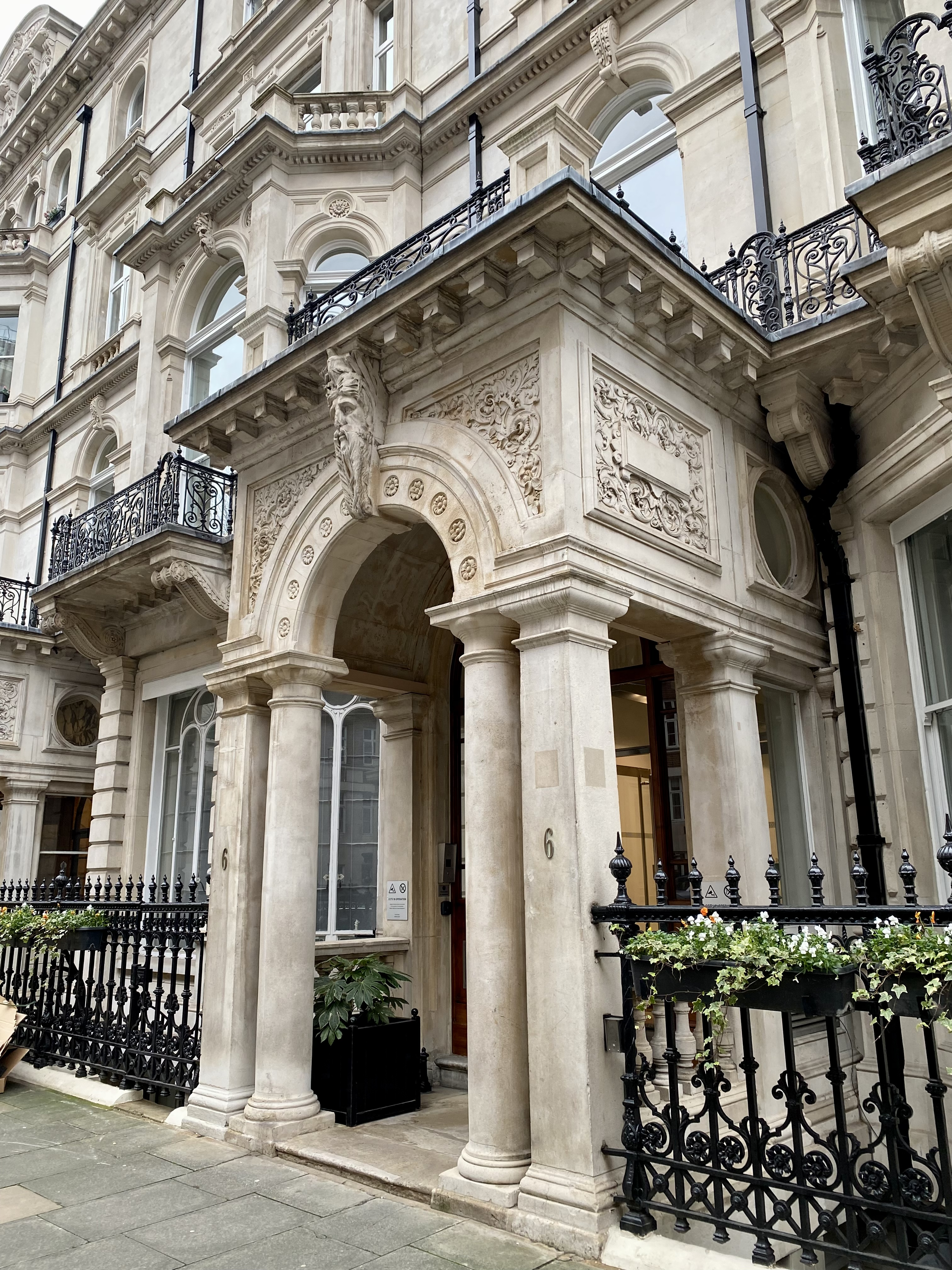
Entrance porch to 6 Chesterfield Gardens in Mayfair, London.

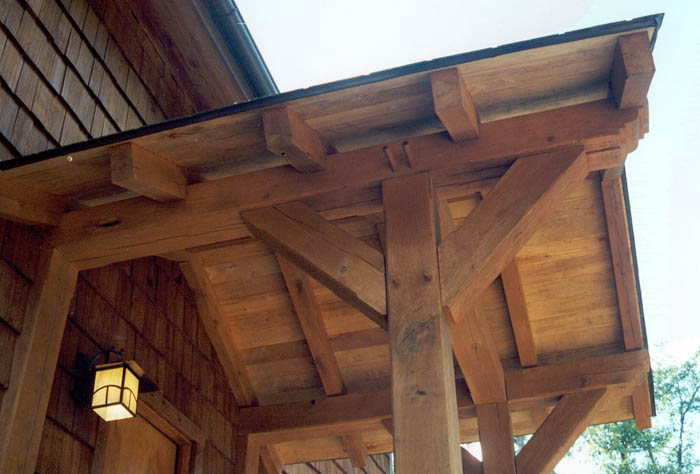
Detail of a porch in a modern timber-framed house

=== Arizona room ===
An Arizona room is a type of screened porch commonly found in Arizona.

=== Screened porch ===
A screened porch, also called a screened-in-porch, is a porch that was built or altered to be enclosed with screens that effectively creates an outdoor type room.

=== Sleeping porch ===
A sleeping porch is a porch that was built or modified to be a type of semi-outdoor sleeping area. A sleeping porch can be an ordinary open porch, screened or with screened windows that can be opened.

=== Rain porch ===
A rain porch is a type of porch with the roof and columns extended past the deck and reaching the ground. The roof may extend several feet past the porch creating a covered patio. A rain porch, also referred to as a Carolina porch, is usually found in the Southeastern United States.

=== Portico ===
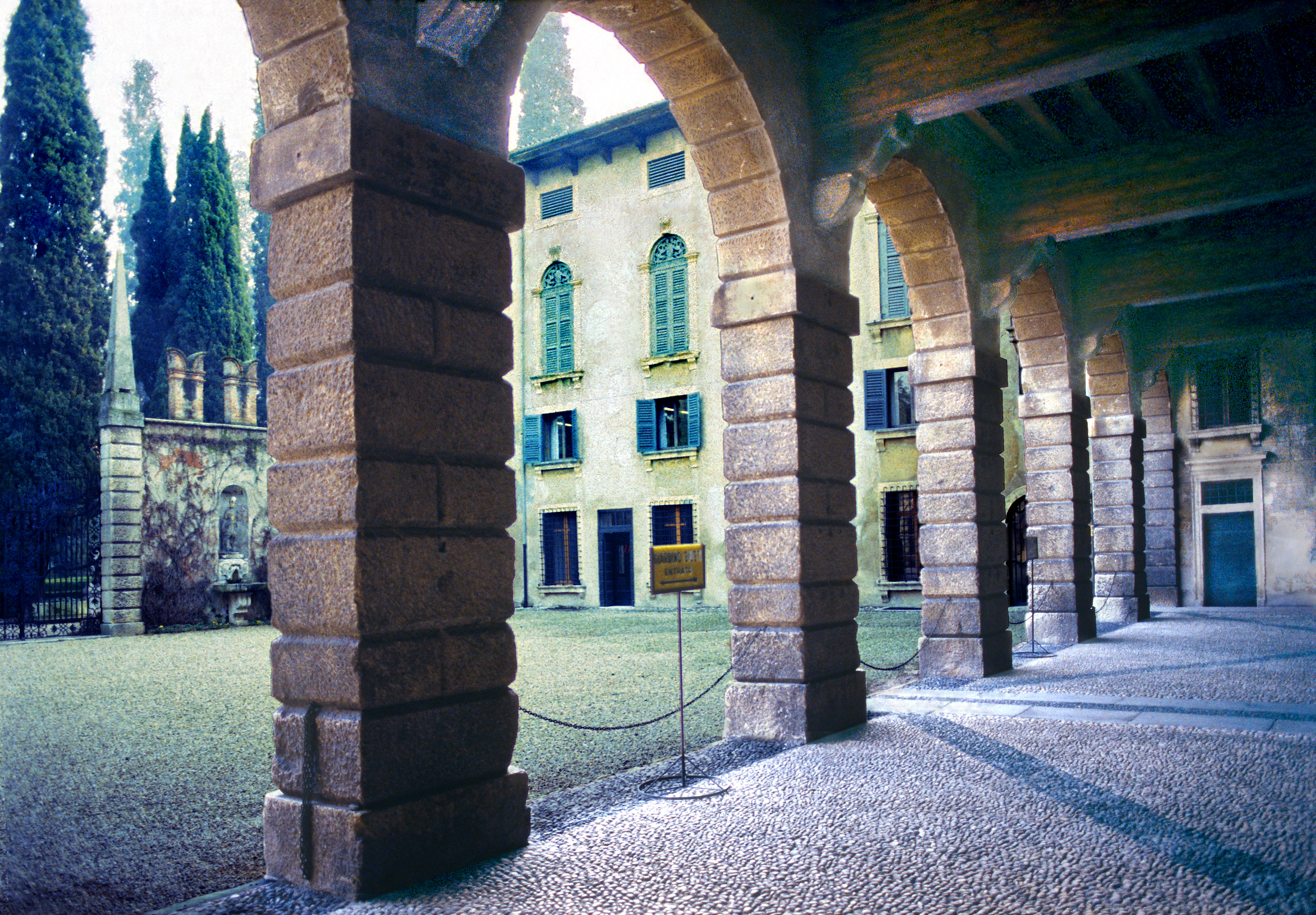
Palazzo Giusti's Portico

A portico (Italian) is a porch style that utilizes columns or colonnades, and even arches, such as used in Italian modern and contemporary architecture.

=== Loggia ===
A loggia is a covered exterior corridor or porch that is part of the ground floor or can be elevated on another level. The roof is supported by columns or arches and the outer side is open to the elements.

=== Veranda ===
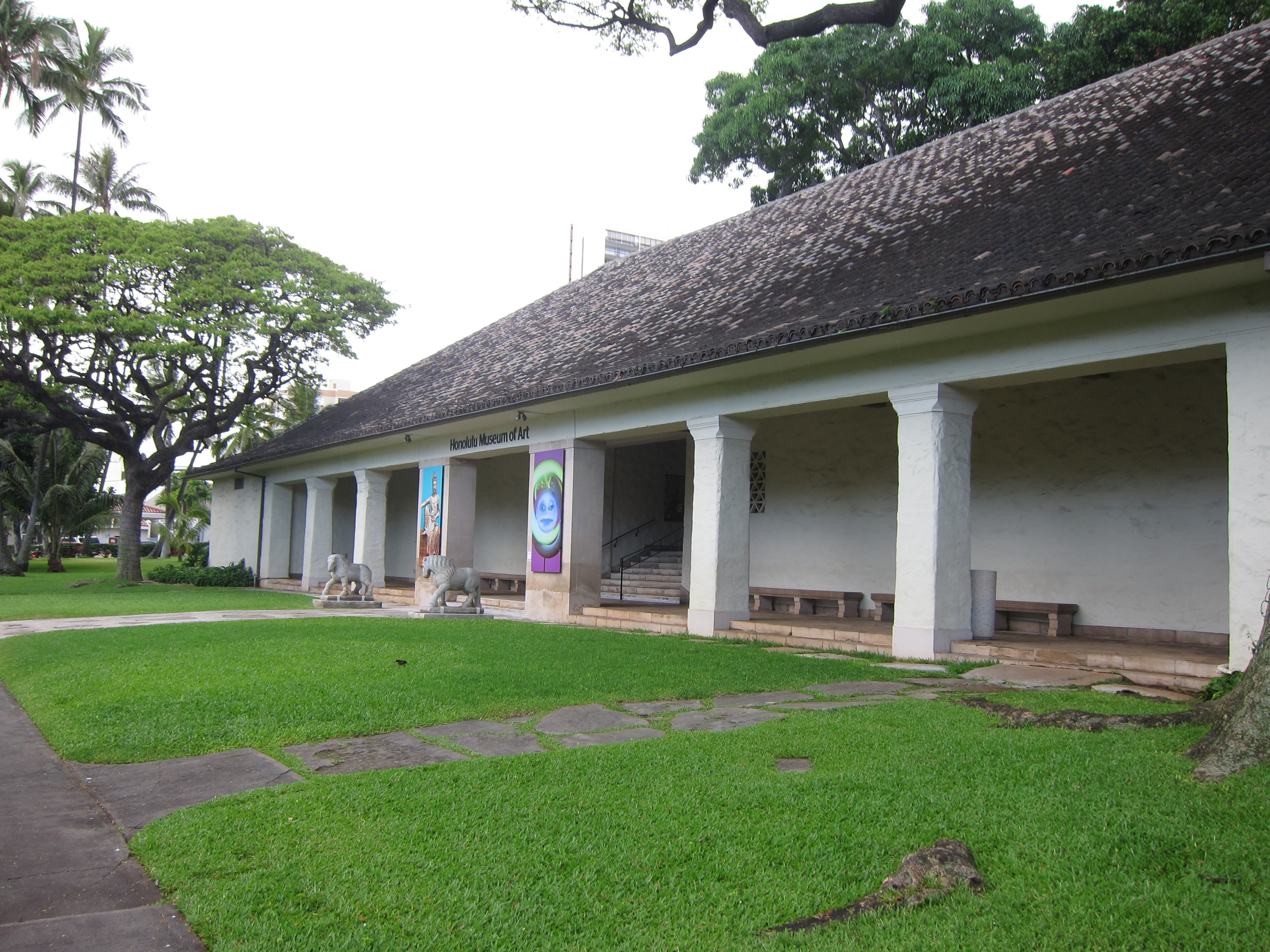
Honolulu Museum of Art - entrance veranda

A veranda (also spelled 'verandah') style porch is usually large and may encompass the entire façade as well as the sides of a structure. An extreme example is the Grand Hotel on Mackinac Island, Michigan, which has the longest porch in the world at 660 feet (200 m) in length.

=== Lanai ===
A lanai is a roofed, open-sided veranda, patio, or porch originating in Hawaii.

=== Sun porch ===
A sun porch, or sun room, also referred to as a Florida room, can be any room or separate structure, usually enclosed with glass, but can be an enclosed porch.

=== Stoop ===
A stoop is a landing, usually small, at the top of steps and when covered by a roof is a small porch.

== North America ==
See also: Veranda

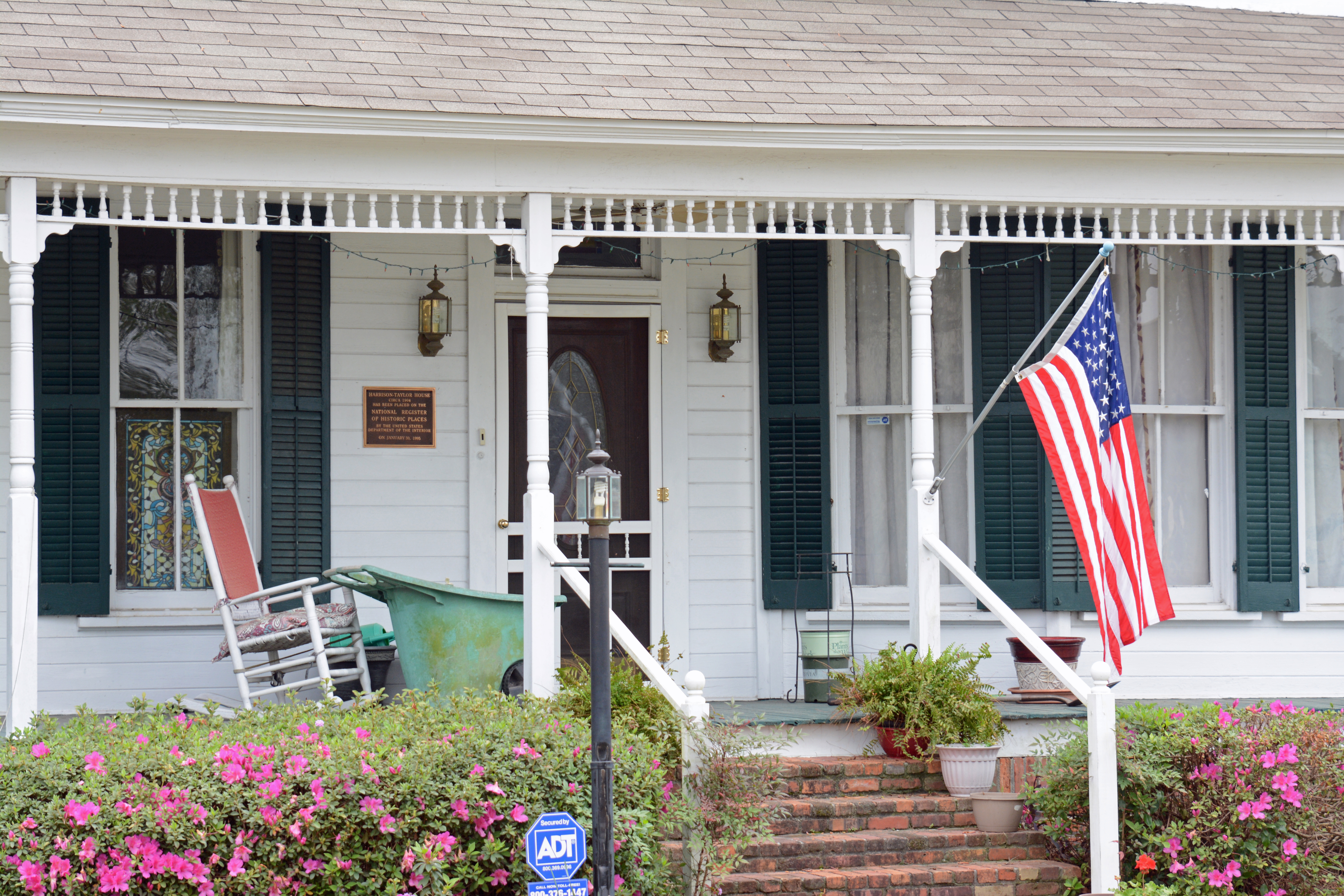
Porch of the Queen Anne style cottage William G. Harrison House

In northeastern North America, a porch is a small area, usually unenclosed, at the main-floor height and used as a sitting area or for the removal of working clothes so as not to get the home's interior dirty, when the entrance door is accessed via the porch. In the Southwestern United States, ranch-style homes often use a porch to provide shade for the entrance and southern wall of the residence.

In the Southern United States and Southern Ontario, Canada, a porch is often at least as broad as it is deep, and it may provide sufficient space for residents to entertain guests or gather on special occasions. Adobe-style homes in Santa Fe, New Mexico, often include large porches for entertainment called "portals", which are not usually seen in the more traditional adobe homes.

Older American homes, particularly those built during the era of Victorian architecture, or built in the Queen Anne style, often include a porch in both the front and the back of the home. The back porch is used as another sitting space. However, many American homes built with a porch since the 1940s have only a token one, usually too small for comfortable social use and adding only to the visual impression of the building.

The New Urbanism movement in architecture urges a reversal in this trend, recommending a large front porch, to help build community ties.

When spacious enough, a covered porch not only provides protection from sun or rain but comprises, in effect, extra living space for the home during pleasant weather—accommodating chairs or benches, tables, plants, and traditional porch furnishings such as a porch swing, rocking chairs, or ceiling fans.

Porches may be screened to exclude flying insects. Normally, the porch is architecturally unified with the rest of the house, using similar design elements. It may be integrated into the roof line.

Many porch railings are designed with importance to the design of the building as well as curb appeal but local, state, or federal zoning laws usually mandate the height of the railing and spacing of balusters. There are exemptions for houses in historic districts or that are on the National Register of Historic Places. The National Park Service produced a pamphlet or brief concerning Preserving Historic Wood Porches.

The world’s longest front porch is located in on the Grand Hotel on Mackinac Island, Michigan. The entire hotel is an example of Queen Anne architecture. The porch is approximately 660 feet long.

== Britain ==
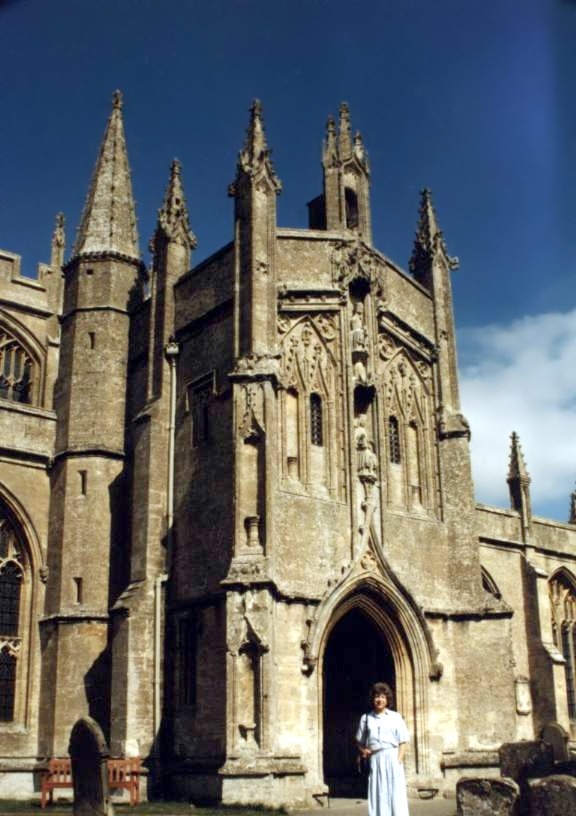
Highly decorated two-storey south porch of 1480 at Northleach Parish Church, England.

In Great Britain, the projecting porch had come into common use in churches by early medieval times. They were usually built of stone but occasionally were of timber. Normally they were placed on the south side of the church, but also on the west and north sides, sometimes in multiple. The porches served to give cover to worshipers, but they also had a liturgical use. At a baptism, the priest would receive the sponsors, with the infant, in the porch and the service began there. A common and similar function could be served at weddings, where the marriage was officiated in the porch, and then blessed inside the church.

In later medieval times, the porch sometimes had two storeys, with a room above the entrance which was used as a local school, meeting room, storeroom, or even armoury. If the village or town possessed a collection of books, it would be housed there.

Sometimes the church custodian lived in the upper storey and a window into the church would allow supervision of the main church interior. Some British churches have highly ornamented porches, both externally and internally. The south porch at Northleach, Gloucestershire, in the Cotswolds, built in 1480, is a well-known example, and there are several others in East Anglia and elsewhere in the UK.

== India ==
In India, porches and verandahs are popular elements of secular and religious architecture. In Hindu temples, the mandapa is a porch-like structure that connects the gopuram (ornate gateway) to the temple. It is used for religious dancing and music, and is a part of the basic temple compound. Examples of Indian buildings with porches include:

- Kailash Temple
- Cooch Behar Palace
- Ajanta Caves
- Chennakesava Temple at Somanathapura
- Hoysaleswara Temple
- Dholpur House

The term sit-out is used to describe the porch of a residential building.

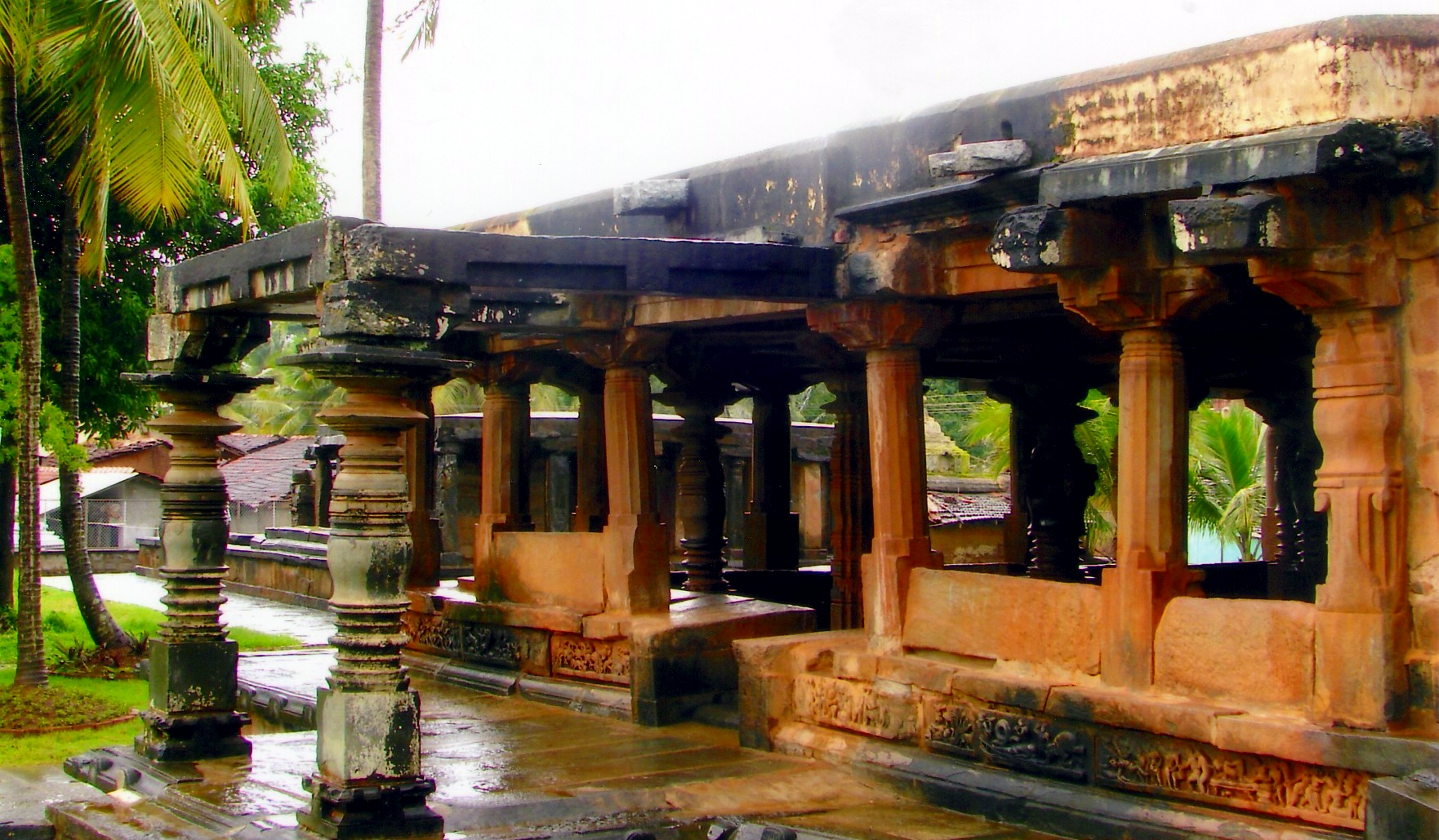
Ancient temple porch to a mandapa, India

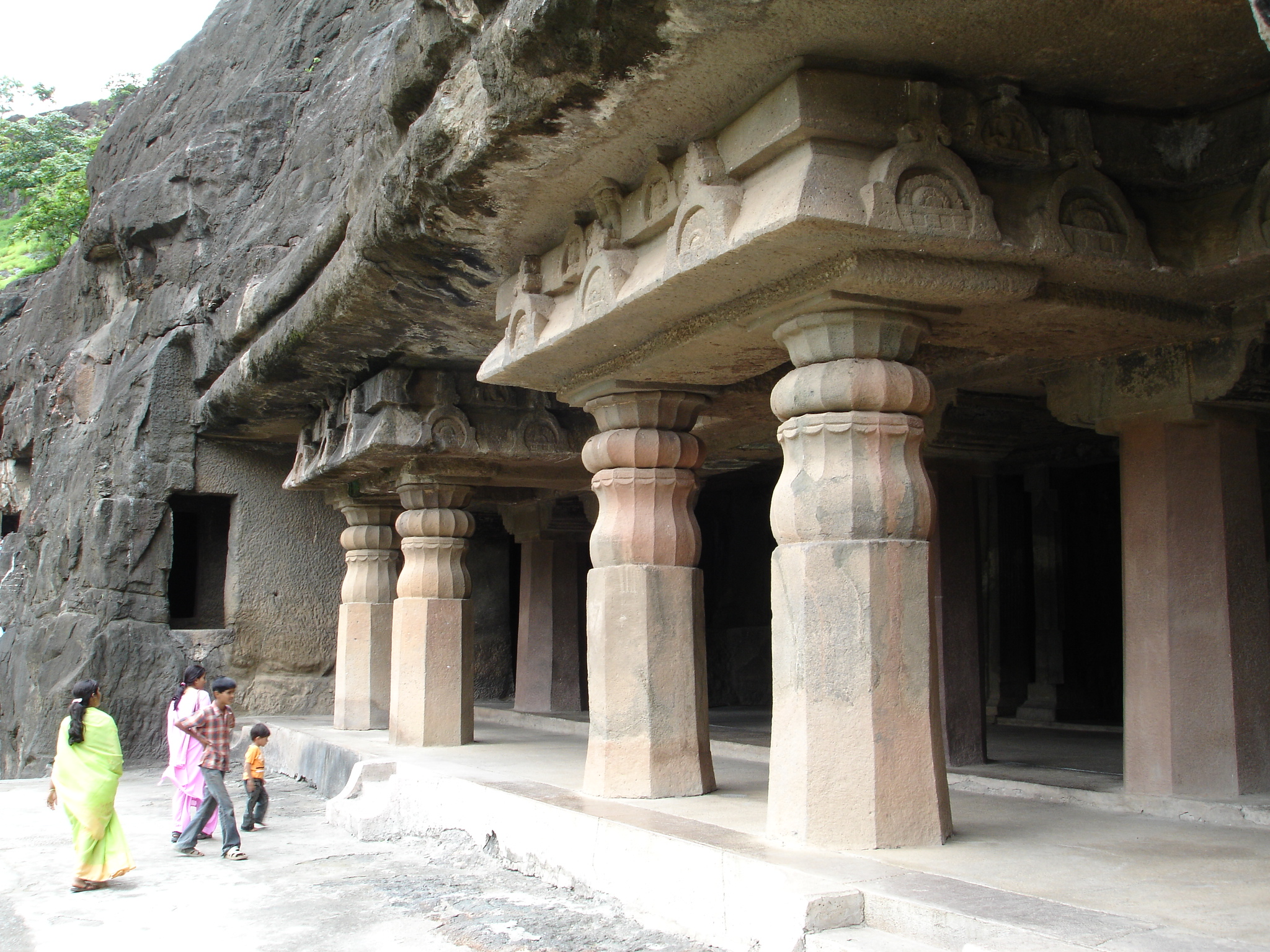
The porch to the entrance to Cave Two, Ajanta Caves, India

== See also ==
- Balcony
- Church porch
- Deck
- Engawa
- Iwan
- Patio
- Porte-cochère
- Porch sitting
- Talar
