= Henryk Stepien =

Polish endocrinologist, neurologist and researcher

Professor Henryk Stepien
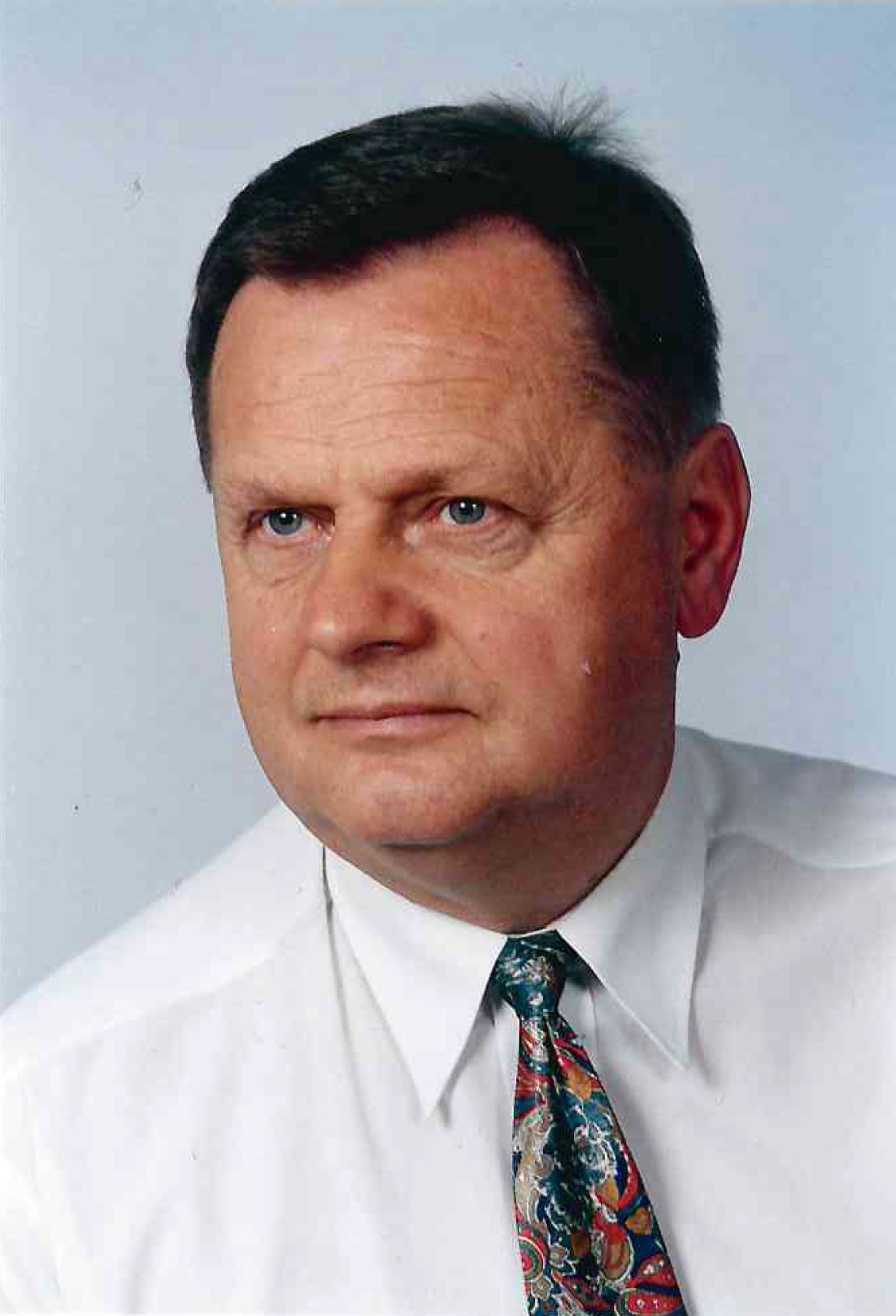
- Born: 6 December 1948 (age 77); Tomaszow Mazowiecki
- Education: Medical Academy of Lodz
- Awards: Silver Cross of Merit; Knight's Cross - Order of Polonia Restituta; Officer's Cross - Order of Polonia Restituta; Honorary Badge of the Polish Red Cross; Medal of Merit for National Defence
- Scientific career
- Fields: Endocrinology, Neurology
- Workplaces: Medical University of Lodz, McMaster University, Hamilton University of Texas, Austin

Henryk Mikołaj Stępień (Polish: [ˈxɛnrɨk miˈkɔwaj ˈstɛmpjɛj̃]; born 6 December 1948 in Tomaszow Mazowiecki) is a Polish endocrinologist, neurologist and professor of medicine who is head of the Department of Endocrinology at the Medical University of Lodz and was rector of the Medical Academy of Lodz from 1996 to 2002.

== Career as a doctor ==
Henryk Stepien graduated with honors from the Medical Academy of Lodz, where he studied medicine between 1966 and 1972. He received his Ph.D. in 1976 after completing his doctoral studies at the Institute of Endocrinology of the Medical Academy of Lodz. He then worked as a senior lecturer and an associate professor at the Department of Experimental Endocrinology and Hormonal Diagnostics of the Institute of Endocrinology in Lodz, where in 1984, he received his habilitation and in 1992 became a professor.

Henryk Stepien completed his scientific internships in the United States at the Institute of Biomedical Research of the University of Texas in Austin, where he worked with the biochemist, professor Karl Folkers between 1980 and 1982. In 1991 he worked as a visiting professor at McMaster University in Hamilton, Canada, with the team of a Canadian immunologist, professor Jack Gauldie.

During his academic career, he also held various managerial positions at the University of Lodz. Between 1987 and 1990, he was the vice-dean of the Faculty of Medicine, and from 1993 to 1996, the vice-rector for didactics and education. In 1996 he was elected Rector of the Medical University of Lodz, position which he held for two terms, until 2002.

In 2002 Professor Stepien initiated establishment by the Parliament of the Republic of Poland, of the first Medical University in Poland (merging Medical Academy and Military Medical Academy in Lodz).

In the years 2008–2019, he was the head of the Department of Immunoendocrinology and the Department of Endocrinology of the Medical University in Lodz.

== Scientific career ==
Professor Stepien's academic achievements encompass over 300 publications, including 193 peer-reviewed articles in full version. The vast majority of papers have been published in international journals (i.e., Endocrinology, Neuroendocrinology, European Journal of Endocrinology, Cytokine). His research papers have been cited in the world literature over 2,500 times. His scientific and research activity focuses mainly on neuroimmunoendocrinology - an interdisciplinary field of research, dealing with connections between the nervous, immune and endocrine systems. That includes research on the effect of cytokines on the activity of the hypothalamic-pituitary system, pathogenesis and diagnostics of immune-related endocrinopathies and the role of neoangiogenesis in the development of endocrine glands.

Professor Stepien has also significantly contributed to the organization of science and the development of higher medical education in Poland - he led the transformation of the Medical Academy of Lodz into the Medical University of Lodz in 2002.

During 2007–2012, he was the head of the European Union's COST ACTION National Research Programme.

He is a member of many scientific societies including, the American Endocrine Society, European Neuroendocrine Association, Polish Society of Endocrinology and Polish Neurological Society. He is on the board of several editorial committees of national and international medical journals. Between 2012 and 2015, he held the position of an advisor to the National Science Center in Krakow, Poland.

== Awards and distinctions ==
Decorated with Honorary Badge of the Polish Red Cross (1995), Silver Cross of Merit (1996), Knight's Cross (2007) and Officer's Cross of the Order of Polonia Restituta (2012), and Medal of Merit for National Defence (2000). He also received multiple scientific awards from the Ministry of Health, Polish Endocrinological Society and the Medical University of Lodz.
