= Kimberly Lacy =

American TV personality, stylist and designer (born 1981)

- Born: 2 April 1981 (age 45); Dumas, Arkansas, United States
- Occupations: Artisan painter Stylist; Co-host/project manager Humanitarian; Motivational speaker
- Years active: 1999–Present
- Website: http://www.KimberlyLacy.com

Kimberly Lacy (born April 2, 1981) is an American television personality, wardrobe stylist, landscape designer and is the owner operator of a construction company. Born in Dumas, Arkansas, United States, she currently resides in Atlanta, Georgia.

She is the project manager on HGTV's Curb Appeal: The Block, where she shares her practical painting tips, techniques and demonstrations with viewers. Prior to joining the show, Lacy served as the lead painter on the HGTV series Designed to Sell.

As celebrity stylist, Lacy has worked with the likes of Wilhelmina and Elite Models, celebrity photographer Derek Blanks, and publications Essence and Black Elegance. She owns and operates her own design and artisan paint company Anatomy of Design. She contributes monthly articles for Sister 2 Sister magazine's Home Improvement section.

Lacy is an ambassador for a non-profit organization, The Fuller Center for Housing, The organization increases the quality of living in impoverished neighborhoods. Most recently, Lay has been appointed to the 3M Construction & Home Improvement Division's Influencer Team and spokesperson for EarthShare California. (Note: De La Paz%5d%5d-Kimberly-Lacy-and-Jimmy-DiResta-Join-the-3M-Construction-and-Home-Impr-13622996/ "3M Construction and Home Improvement Influencer Team". Press release. TV Rage.)
