= Designed to Sell =

- Genre: Reality; Home improvement
- Starring: Clive Pearse; Shane Tallant; Michael Johnson; Rachel Reenstra; Bethany Souza
- Country of origin: United States
- Original language: English

Production
- Running time: 30 minutes

Original release
- Network: HGTV
- Release: 2004 – 2011

Designed to Sell is an American HGTV reality television show produced by Pie Town Productions in Los Angeles and Chicago and Edelman Productions in Washington, D.C., and Atlanta. Each 30-minute episode focuses on fixing up a home that is about to go on the market or that has been on the market but has not attracted buyers. The show began airing in 2004 and was canceled in 2011.

The show provides expert real estate and design advice and general contractors, who are given a $2,000 budget for materials to get a maximum offer for the house. To add excitement to the show, the renovations generally take place over a period of three to seven days, before the home's open house, generally spread out over the course of three or four weeks. The show pays the contractor's fees and the salaries of the carpenters, landscapers, painters, plumbers, and other workers. Most changes are cosmetic, but some require drastic demolition and reconstruction.

== Description ==
Each show follows the same general format:

1. Homeowner introduction
2. Recognized problems
3. Professional real estate agent appraisal
4. Redesign plan
5. Demolition, if any
6. Construction, painting, etc.
7. Review of changes
8. Budget breakdown
9. Home Staging
10. Open house
11. Result

At the beginning of each episode, the homeowners are introduced and explain why they are selling. The most common reasons are upsizing for growing families, downsizing for empty-nesters, and job transfers. The homeowners may discuss their views on why the property is not selling.

The host and a real estate expert walk through the property while the homeowners watch on closed-circuit television from a neighbor's home. Because the goal is to get the most money for the house in the shortest possible time, they are very direct in their opinion of the home's assets and flaws and recommend three rooms or areas to be re-done. If the property has been neglected or the décor is too eccentric for the most likely home-buyers, their assessments can be brutal.

After the appraisal, the designer reviews the main defects the real estate expert pointed out and describes their plan to fix them. Then the homeowners, the host, the designer, and the laborers get to work, usually explaining to the audience what they are doing. This often includes some demolition and building and/or installation of new features, such as shelves, awnings, etc. While the episode's budget pays for materials, it does not include any carpentry labor costs.

Often, as the date for the open house nears, they may run into unanticipated problems and may have to work around them or work longer in order to meet the deadline.

After all the changes are complete, the designer reviews the changes with the homeowners and the viewers are shown "before" and "after" views of the improved areas. This is often accompanied by host voiceover.

Afterwards, the host discusses how the $2,000 budget was spent, such as for paint, construction materials, accents, etc. The show normally comes in within $10 of the $2,000 limit.

The homeowners and designer leave before the open house commences. The host stays and asks prospective buyers their opinions of the home, which are almost universally gushing. The host often also asks if the visitors are considering making an offer.

After the open house, the host tells the homeowners the general opinions of the open house viewers and any offers they've already received. The show ends describing how quickly the house was sold. Often the house sells above the asking price. While the asking price is never revealed, the host or homeowners usually disclose how much above the asking price the house sold for.

== Locations ==
Designed to Sell features homes in four real estate markets (and nearby suburbs): Los Angeles, California, Washington, D.C., Chicago, Illinois, and Atlanta, Georgia. Each location has its own specific host, designer, carpenters, and real estate experts.

The first three seasons of the show took place solely in Los Angeles. Later more locations were added. Four metro areas were featured regularly, the Los Angeles team still being the marquee crew, with HGTV regularly running short segments called "Lisa La Pointers" and "Clive Unleashed" during commercial breaks. Clive and Lisa are also featured in most ads and promos for the show. Even though the Washington D.C., Chicago, and Atlanta episodes have their own hosts who talk to the homeowners and help in the transformation of the home, Clive Pearse narrates many of the non-L.A. episodes from off-location. When Clive was unavailable for hosting in L.A., Michael Johnson or Shane Tallant were the guest host.

=== Los Angeles ===
- Host: Clive Pearse
- Designer: Lisa LaPorta
- Carpenters: Jim Collins (2004–05), Brad Haviland (2004–05), Marcus Hunt (2008), Jason Eslinger, Steve Hanneman, Brooks Utley, Sean Anthony Moran, Deus Xavier Scott and Greg Plitt
- Real Estate Experts: Donna Freeman and Shannon Freeman

=== Chicago ===
- Host: Michael Johnson
- Designer: Monica Pedersen
- Carpenters: Robert North, Jeff Alba, Chad Lopez and Lynn Kegan
- Real Estate Experts: Kathy Quaid, Brandie Malay and Bethany Souza
- Producers: Sarah Patton, Jennifer Bernardi
- Production Assistants: Becky McCallum, Melanie Pot, Jerry Goodwin, Leslie Weiner, Robert Dressel

=== Washington, D.C. ===
- Host: Shane Tallant
- Designer: Taniya Nayak
- Carpenters: John Allen (thru 2007), Matt Steele (thru 2007), Barr Huefner, Lynn Kegan, Simon Ley
- Real Estate Experts: Shirley Mattam-Male and Terry Haas

=== Atlanta ===
- Host: Rachel Reenstra (thru 2010), Chi-Lan Lieu
- Designer: John Gidding
- Carpenters: David Wint and Chip Wade (now with Gidding on Curb Appeal: The Block)
- Real Estate Experts: Heyward Young and Tonya M. Williams
- Photography & Seamster: Joshua Mark Thomas

== Designed to Sell: Room by Room ==
In April 2008, Designed to Sell: Room by Room debuted on HGTV's real estate website, FrontDoor.com with more than 80 video clips and slideshows cut from episode archives. Users are able to search by room type for home staging ideas and inspiration delivered in short three- to four-minute webisodes and before-and-after slideshows.

== See also ==
- Restaurant: Impossible
