= Rachel Reenstra =

American actress, comedian and television personality (born 1970)

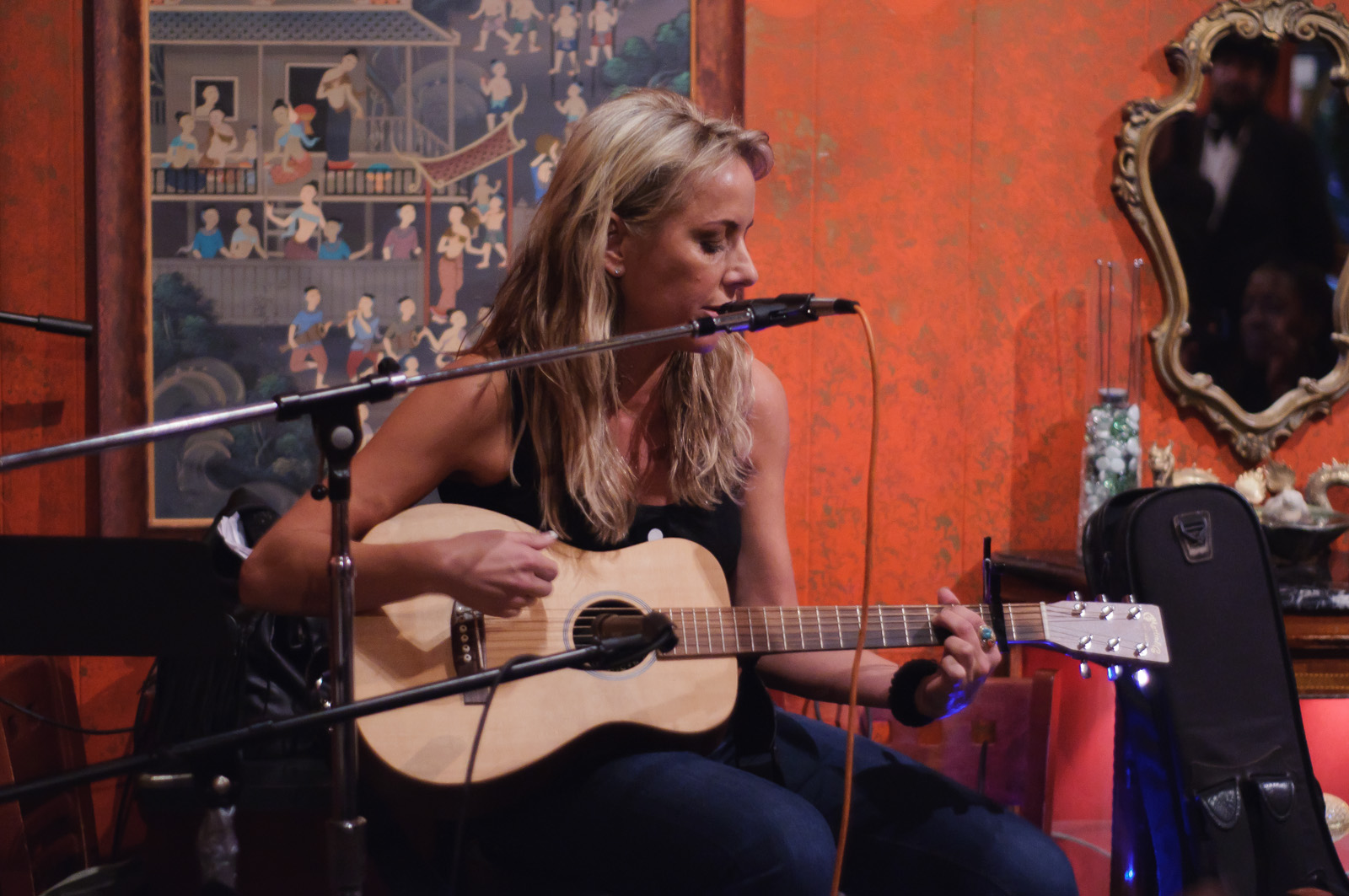
Reenstra in 2012

Rachel Reenstra (born February 16, 1970) is an American actress, comedian, television personslity and wildlife conservationist from Saugatuck, Michigan.

== Education ==
Reenstra earned a Bachelor of Arts degree in theatre from Hope College in 1991 and a Master of Arts in spiritual psychology in 2001.

== Career ==
Reenstra has played roles in various movies and television shows, including numerous sitcoms, dozens of commercials and has performed hundreds of voice overs and is a public speaker as well as a stand-up comedian. She is the current host of the weekend Disney–ABC Television Group Three time Emmy-nominated series The Wildlife Docs in its fifth season filmed at Busch Gardens (Tampa) and on location at field sites around the world. Reenstra was also the hostess of the Animal Planet reality television series and travel program Ms. Adventure which was a personality based program where she traveled the world comparing animal and human behavior. Reenstra is also known for hosting Designed to Sell (Atlanta team), which aired through 2010 for HGTV.

== Filmography ==
=== Film ===
| Year | Title | Role | Notex |
|---|---|---|---|
| 1996 | Secret Places | Model #11 | |
| 1998 | 30, Still Single: Contemplating Suicide | Margaret / Megan | |
| 1999 | Nice Guys Sleep Alone | Janet | |
| 2011 | Sedona | Linda | |

=== Television ===
| Year | Title | Role | Notex |
|---|---|---|---|
| 1996 | A Case for Life | Audience member | Television film |
| 1997 | Mad TV | Woman | Episode #2.19 |
| 1997 | The Naked Truth | Laura | Episode: "Bridesface Revisited" |
| 1998 | Oh Baby | Co-worker | Episode: "Pilot" |
| 1999–2002 | Beyond Belief: Fact or Fiction | Various role | 3 episodes |
| 2000 | Becker | Lana, Drug Rep | Episode: "Old Yeller" |
| 2001 | Primetime Glick | Interviewer | Episode: "Bill Maher/Steve Martin" |
| 2002 | The District | News Anchor | Episode: "Drug Money" |
| 2003 | Sabrina the Teenage Witch | Woman with Baby | Episode: "In Sabrina We Trust" |
| 2004 | Rock Me Baby | Stage Mom | Episode: "Pretty Baby" |
| 2006 | Still Standing | Attractive Woman #1 | Episode: "Still Deceitful" |

=== Video games ===
| Year | Title | Role |
|---|---|---|
| 1997 | Herc's Adventures | Atlanta |
| 1997 | Outlaws | Anna Anderson |
| 1998 | Grim Fandango | Eva |
| 1999 | Star Wars: X-Wing Alliance | Rebel Pilot |
| 2001 | Star Wars: Galactic Battlegrounds | Various voices |
| 2005 | Star Wars: Battlefront II | Various voices |
| 2006 | Tom Clancy's Splinter Cell: Double Agent | Enrica Villablanca |
