= HGTV Dream Home =

American television programming

HGTV Dream Home is the American cable television network HGTV's annual project house and sweepstakes, held since 1997. The sweepstakes commences with a January 1st television special showcasing the fully furnished, custom-built home valued in excess of one million dollars; viewers are invited to enter online. The 2012 contest drew over 81 million entries.

Starting with the 2004 Dream Home in St. Marys, Georgia, public tours have been offered, with some of the ticket proceeds benefiting local charitable groups. The 2012 proceeds went to the Make-A-Wish Foundation of Utah.

Most of the Dream Home winners have sold their prizes, largely due to the accompanying property taxes and bills. As of 2006, only two winners had lived in their houses. 2005 winner Don Cruz initially planned to keep the house, located on Lake Tyler, after having his plan to rent out the dockhouse and master bedroom suite on a nightly basis rejected by Tyler, Texas's city government; however, he decided to sell after receiving tax forms showing the house had a higher value than he originally thought.

== Dream Home locations ==
- 1997 - Jackson, Wyoming
- 1998 - Beaufort, South Carolina
- 1999 - Rosemary Beach, Florida
- 2000 - Nehalem, Oregon
- 2001 - Camden, Maine
- 2002 - Sherwood, Maryland
- 2003 - Mexico Beach, Florida
- 2004 - St. Mary's, Georgia
- 2005 - Tyler, Texas
- 2006 - Lake Lure, North Carolina
- 2007 - Winter Park, Colorado
- 2008 - Islamorada, Florida
- 2009 - Sonoma, California
- 2010 - Sandia Park, New Mexico
- 2011 - Stowe, Vermont
- 2012 - Midway, Utah
- 2013 - Kiawah Island, South Carolina
- 2014 - Truckee, California
- 2015 - Martha's Vineyard, Massachusetts
- 2016 - Merritt Island, Florida
- 2017 - St. Simons, Georgia
- 2018 - Gig Harbor, Washington
- 2019 - Whitefish, Montana
- 2020 - Hilton Head Island, South Carolina
- 2021 - Portsmouth, Rhode Island
- 2022 - Warren, Vermont
- 2023 - Morrison, Colorado
- 2024 - Anastasia Island, Florida
- 2025 - Bluffton, South Carolina
- 2026 - Charlotte, North Carolina

== See also ==
- Home to Win (HGTV Canada)
- Home Free (2015 TV series) (Fox TV USA)
