= Knock First =

American reality television series

- Genre: Reality television
- Written by: David Collins
- Starring: John Gidding; Dwight E. Schultz; Dean L
- Country of origin: United States
- Original language: English
- No. of seasons: 2
- No. of episodes: 24

Production
- Running time: 30 minutes
- Production company: Scout Productions

Original release
- Network: ABC Family
- Release: October 6, 2003 – October 1, 2004

Knock First is an American reality television series in which an adolescent is chosen for a total room makeover by the Knock First crew. The series first aired in October 2003 on ABC Family.

The premise of the show was to shape the room in which the teenager lives into a space that represents them better. Teenagers who had been living in the same room since they were toddlers are able to redesign the room according to their desires. The series included four designers: Taniya Nayak, John Gidding, Kathy Kuo, Shane Booth, and two carpenters: Carrie Roy and Andy Hampton.

The first season of Knock First centered mainly around teenagers in and around the Northeast, whereas the second season expanded to homes in California, to a slightly older audience.

The show theme for the first season was titled "(This Is The Way) I Am", and was written and produced by Widelife, also creators of the theme for Bravo's Queer Eye, and performed by Faith Trent. The show theme for the second season was titled "Bring it to Life," written and performed by Kat Meoz.

The show was supposed to be redesigned for its third season, but was canceled after two seasons instead.
