= Judi Allen =

British scientist and academic

Judi Allen FRS FMedSci FRSE FRSB
- Born: Judith Elizabeth Allen
- Education: Bates College; University of California, Berkeley
- Awards: EMBO Member (2018)
- Scientific career
- Workplaces: University of Manchester; Imperial College London; University of Edinburgh
- Thesis: The cysteine-rich proteins of Chlamydia trachomatis in structure and immunity (1991)
- Website: research.manchester.ac.uk/en/persons/judi.allen

Judith Elizabeth Allen FRS FMedSci FRSE FRSB is a British scientist who is Professor of Immunobiology at the University of Manchester. She is an expert on macrophages activated during helminthiasis and was elected Fellow of the Royal Society (FRS) in 2023. She has also done extensive work into type 2 immunity and was awarded Honorary Professor at the University of Edinburgh in 2016.

== Early life and education ==
Allen earned her undergraduate degree at Bates College. She was a doctoral researcher at the University of California, Berkeley, where her PhD investigated cysteine-rich proteins of Chlamydia trachomatis.

== Research and career ==
Allen spent several years in the biotechnology sector before joining Imperial College London as a postdoctoral researcher. In 1997, she was awarded a fellowship from the Medical Research Council and moved to the University of Edinburgh. She was made Professor of Immunobiology there in 2005.

Allen studies helminthiasis, a disease caused by helminth (parasitic worm) infection. The infection is associated with the induction of a type 2 immune response in mammals. Allen has identified macrophages with a specific type 2 expression profile, which are found both at the site of the infection and in injured tissue. The macrophage phenotype is influenced by the genotype of the host and the infected site. Allen discovered a relationship between the chitinase-like protein 3 YM1 and Interleukin 17, an inflammatory cytokine associated with autoimmune disease.

Judi Allen has also completed some research explaining the relationship between a type 2 cytokine Interleukin 13, IL-13, and SARS-Cov-2 infection, better known as COVID-19. SARS-Cov-2 is a virus that affects the respiratory system and patients exhibit higher levels of inflammatory cytokines in response to infection. Allen helped discover that IL-13 encourages SARS-Cov-2 to progress in severity through the increased accumulation of hyaluronan polysaccharide (HA) in the lungs. In her study, Allen discovered Interleukin 13 neutralization resulted in a decrease in the amount of HA in the lungs and a decrease in the severity of the disease.

Allen then went on to join the University of Manchester faculty in 2016.

Allen also published a paper in 2023 concerning T helper 2 cells and nematode infection. Allen used mice with different immune genotypes to measure the different immune responses to Litomosoides sigmodontis, a nematode that infects the pleural cavity. Th2 cells, T helper 2, controlled the cell's pathway of the tissue-resident macrophages from monocytes which affected the infection response. C57BL/6 mice had a strong conversion to large cavity macrophage from the monocyte while BALB/c mice had a weak conversion. Therefore, Allen has made an impact in the adaptive immune response component of cells in immunobiology.

Judi Allen has helped to establish a relationship between the extracellular matrix in organisms and the immune system. The matrix and the immune system must work together to fight any infection or disease in organisms. There are many molecules and relationships that contribute to this working partnership. For example, the immune system will regulate the extracellular matrix through chemokines or cytokines, inflammatory signals, which will call for leukocyte extravasation to an injury site. Interleukin 13, a type 2 cytokine Allen has worked with previously, not only regulates hyaluronan polysaccharide but also mucus which is an important structure in the extracellular matrix as well. Allen has also emphasized the importance this relationship has for potential new immunotherapies.

== Awards and honours ==
- Fellow of the Royal Society of Edinburgh (FRSE)
- Fellow of the Royal Society of Biology (FRSB)
- Fellow of the Royal Society (FRS)
- Member of European Molecular Biology Organization
- Fellow of the Academy of Medical Sciences (FMedSci)
- Honorary Professor of University of Edinburgh

== Selected publications ==
- Donlan, Alexandra N.; Sutherland, Tara E.; Marie, Chelsea; Preissner, Saskia; Bradley, Benjamin T.; Carpenter, Rebecca M.; Sturek, Jeffrey M.; Ma, Jennie Z.; Moreau, G. Brett; Donowitz, Jeffrey R.; Buck, Gregory A.; Serrano, Myrna G.; Burgess, Stacey L.; Abhyankar, Mayuresh M.; Mura, Cameron (2021-08-09). "IL-13 is a driver of COVID-19 severity". JCI Insight. 6 (15). doi:10.1172/jci.insight.150107. ISSN 0021-9738.
- Finlay, Conor M.; Parkinson, James E.; Zhang, Lili; Chan, Brian H. K.; Ajendra, Jesuthas; Chenery, Alistair; Morrison, Anya; Kaymak, Irem; Houlder, Emma L.; Murtuza Baker, Syed; Dickie, Ben R.; Boon, Louis; Konkel, Joanne E.; Hepworth, Matthew R.; MacDonald, Andrew S. (2023-05-09). "T helper 2 cells control monocyte to tissue-resident macrophage differentiation during nematode infection of the pleural cavity". Immunity. 56 (5): 1064–1081.e10. doi:10.1016/j.immuni.2023.02.016. ISSN 1074-7613.
- Davies, Luke; Jenkins, Stephen; Allen, Judith; Taylor, Philip (2013). "Tissue-resident macrophages". Nature Immunology. 14 (10): 986–95. doi:10.1038/ni.2705. PMC 4045180. PMID 24048120. Wikidata Q26991488.
- Murray, Peter; Judith E. Allen; Subhra K. Biswas; et al. (2014). "Macrophage Activation and Polarization: Nomenclature and Experimental Guidelines". Immunity. 41 (2): 339–340. doi:10.1016/j.immuni.2014.07.009. Wikidata Q56942151.
- Jenkins, Stephen; Dominik Ruckerl; Cook, Peter; Lucy H Jones; Fred D Finkelman; Nico van Rooijen; MacDonald, Andrew; Allen, Judith (2011). "Local macrophage proliferation, rather than recruitment from the blood, is a signature of TH2 inflammation". Science. 332 (6035): 1284–1288. doi:10.1126/science.1204351. PMC 3128495. PMID 21566158. Wikidata Q35083309.
