= Charlie Meyerson =

American journalist

Charlie Meyerson is a radio and Internet journalist.

Meyerson was the morning news anchor and Chicago City Hall reporter for WXRT-FM from 1979 to 1989, during which he also served as an adjunct newswriting instructor at Columbia College Chicago from 1982 to 1986.

In October 1989, he left WXRT to become news director, morning news anchor and public affairs director at WNUA-FM, where he served until 1998, also freelancing as columnist for the Wednesday Journal newspaper of Oak Park, Illinois, from 1991 to 1993.

In 1998, he began an almost 11-year run as Tribune Daywatch columnist, editor and senior producer at chicagotribune.com, the Chicago Tribune Internet edition, and as a contributor to newscasts on WGN-AM 720 in Chicago. He became news director at WGN on August 6, 2009, and left on June 17, 2011.

From 2011 to 2012, he was Chicago bureau chief, based at Chicago City Hall, for FM News Chicago, WIQI-FM 101.1.

In August 2012, he signed on as adjunct professor of journalism at Roosevelt University.

In fall 2012, he served as adjunct lecturer in journalism at Northwestern University.

In June 2013, he joined the team preparing to launch HearHere Radio's smartphone-based news radio startup Rivet, as head of news. In April 2015, he signed on full-time as vice president of Rivet News for the newly renamed parent company, Rivet Radio Inc. In 2016, he transitioned to an advisory role as vice president for editorial and development. With his Rivet colleagues, he was awarded a U.S. patent in 2016 for delivering a "contextually relevant media content stream based on listener preference."

In January 2017, Meyerson launched an independent news site ("Chicago's new front page"), Chicago Public Square.

Among the awards for Meyerson's work: A national Edward R. Murrow Award for audio investigative reporting in 2016 from the Radio Television Digital News Association.
