= Curt M. Horvath =

American virologist

Curt M. Horvath, Ph.D.
- Education: BS, Illinois State University MS & PhD, Northwestern University Postdoctoral Studies, The Rockefeller University
- Known for: JAK-STAT Pathways Transcriptional Regulation Immunological RNA Sensing Interferon Signaling
- Scientific career
- Doctoral advisor: Robert A. Lamb (Ph.D. Advisor) James E. Darnell (Postdoc Advisor)

Curt M. Horvath is an American virologist and immunologist. Horvath is a Professor of Molecular Biosciences in the Weinberg College of Arts and Sciences at Northwestern University with secondary appointments in the Feinberg School of Medicine departments of Microbiology-Immunology and Medicine (Hematology / Oncology). He serves as the Director of both the NU High Throughput Analysis Laboratory, and the Northwestern University Center for Cell, Development, and Systems Biology.

== Education and career ==
Horvath attended Carl Sandburg High School and obtained a BS in Biology from Illinois State University. He earned a PhD in 1994 from Northwestern University in Biochemistry, Molecular Biology, and Cell Biology. He did postdoctoral work at The Rockefeller University. Horvath was an Assistant and Associate Professor at the Mount Sinai School of Medicine (now Icahn School of Medicine), in the Immunobiology Center from 1998 to 2004, after which he moved to Northwestern University in a joint position with Evanston Northwestern Healthcare Research Institute, where he was awarded the Jean Ruggles Rosomer Chair of Cancer Research. Horvath is the current President of the International Cytokine and Interferon Society.

== Research ==
In his Ph.D. thesis research, Horvath identified the influenza B virus ion channel protein, BM2 and its means of production by translational stop-start coupling and the role of the fusion peptide in paramyxovirus infection.

He is known for research on cytokine signal transduction, virus-host interactions, innate immunity, and gene regulation in human cells. He has researched the Cytokine-JAK-STAT signal transduction pathway and the RNA-RLR-Interferon signal transduction pathway, two immune recognition and response systems that underlie the primary human immune barriers to infection.

The lab has used genomic techniques to study virus and IFN-stimulated gene regulation and mechanisms of cytokine-inducible gene regulation in the human immune response, reveal fundamental features of RNA polymerase II regulation and epigenetic regulation in antiviral immunity, including identification of novel virus-induced small RNAs. His lab's work has connected cytokine signaling to breast cancer biology.

They were among the first to recognize viral immune antagonism and to characterize the molecular mechanisms underlying virus engagement with STAT proteins. In parallel, the lab uncovered cellular RNA sensors in paramyxovirus suppression, and uncovered their mechanisms of action in both non-self RNA recognition and signaling to drive IFN production. His H-index is 76

== Awards and honors ==
Horvath is an American Cancer Society Research Scholar, and was recipient of the Jean Ruggles Romoser Chair of Cancer Research in 2007. He has been recognized by the International Cytokine and Interferon Society for Distinguished Service in 2022 and presented the Jurg Tschopp Memorial Lecture in 2024. Horvath is the current President of the International Cytokine and Interferon Society (2025-2027).

== Selected publications ==
- Horvath CM, Williams MA, Lamb RA. Eukaryotic coupled translation of tandem cistrons: identification of the influenza B virus BM2 polypeptide. Embo J. 1990;9(8):2639-47. PubMed PMID: 2114979; PMCID: 552297.
- Horvath CM, Lamb RA. Studies on the fusion peptide of a paramyxovirus fusion glycoprotein: roles of conserved residues in cell fusion. J Virol. 1992;66(4):2443-55. Epub 1992/04/01. doi: 10.1128/JVI.66.4.2443-2455.1992. PubMed PMID: 1548771; PMCID: PMC289040.
- Horvath CM, Wen Z, Darnell JE, Jr. A STAT protein domain that determines DNA sequence recognition suggests a novel DNA-binding domain. Genes Dev. 1995;9(8):984-94. PubMed PMID: 7774815.
- Horvath CM, Darnell JE, Jr. The antiviral state induced by alpha interferon and gamma interferon requires transcriptionally active Stat1 protein. J Virol. 1996;70(1):647-50. PubMed PMID: 8523587; PMCID: 189860.
- Parisien J-P, Lau JF, Rodriguez JJ, Sullivan BM, Moscona A, Parks GD, Lamb RA, Horvath CM. The V protein of human parainfluenza virus 2 antagonizes type I interferon responses by destabilizing signal transducer and activator of transcription 2. Virology. 2001;283(2):230-9.
