= Peter Murray (immunologist) =

Australian-American immunologist and biochemist

Peter Jonathan Murray
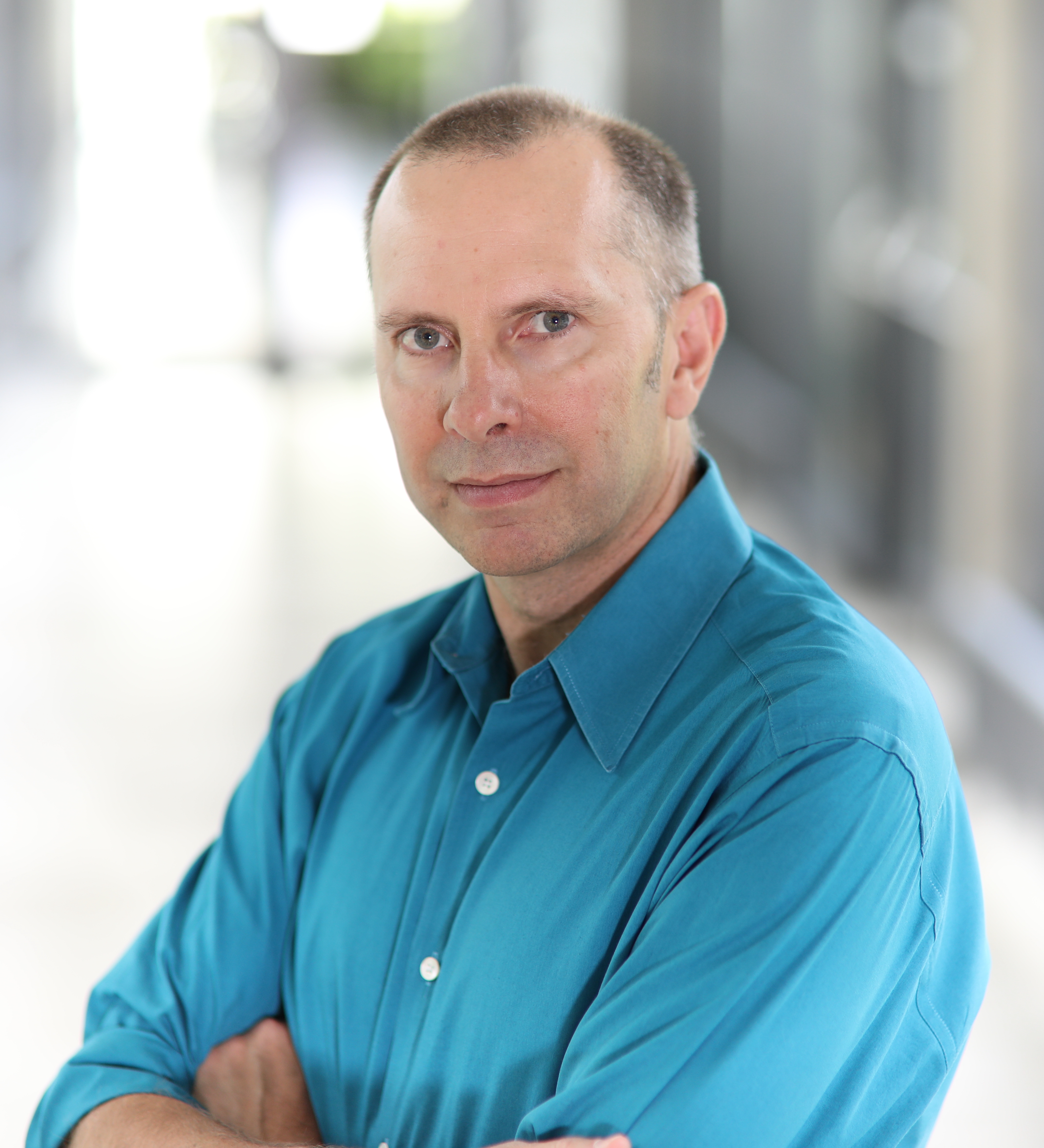
- Born: Melbourne, Australia
- Education: Yarra Valley Grammar Monash University, B.Sc. (Hons) University of Melbourne, PhD Whitehead Institute, Mentor: Richard A. Young
- Spouse(s): Brenda A. Schulman married 1999, Tucson, AZ
- Scientific career
- Fields: Immunology; Biochemistry; Cancer Research; Parasitology
- Website: https://www.biochem.mpg.de/de/murray

Peter Jonathan Murray is an Australian-American immunologist and biochemist. Since 2017, he has been the head of the Immunoregulation research group at the Max Planck Institute for Biochemistry in Martinsried, Germany. His research focuses on the control of immune responses by cytokines and metabolic pathways in the context of infection and cancer.

== Early life ==
Murray was born in the Melbourne suburb of Box Hill and grew up in the eastern suburbs of Croydon and Ringwood. Murray attended Yarra Valley Grammar from 1978-1983.

== Education ==
Murray began his tertiary education in the Faculty of Arts at Monash University. After his first year studying history, he transferred to the Faculty of Science where he focused on chemistry and biochemistry. He graduated with first class honors in Biochemistry 1987 and then began a PhD at the Walter and Eliza Hall Institute, University of Melbourne in parasitology, focusing on identification, gene structure and biology Leishmania cell surface proteins.

== Career ==
Murray performed postdoctoral research in Richard A. Young's laboratory at the Whitehead Institute/Department of Biology, MIT from 1991-1998. Murray joined the Department of Infectious Diseases at St. Jude Children's Research hospital in 1998 and remained there until May, 2017 when he moved to Germany. In addition to heading the Immunoregulation research group, Murray is also an honorary professor in the Faculty of Medicine, Technical University of Munich. At the start of 2024, Murray has published 180 papers and has an h-index of 90.

== Key discoveries ==
Murray is best known for discoveries in the area of how cells of the immune system are controlled by cytokines and metabolic signals, especially essential amino acids such as arginine and tryptophan. Murray's group published key findings about how the central anti-inflammatory cytokine IL-10 controls activated macrophages and the regulation of signaling from the IL-6 receptor, how the arginine hydrolase arginase-1 controls immune responses, and more recently, how immune cells deploy tryptophan metabolism via IL4i1 or IDO1 to suppress oxidative cell death or ferroptosis. Murray is a highly-cited researcher in immunology (Clarivate). In addition, Murray has contributed numerous key research reagents and resources to the field, including the widely-used arginase-1 conditional knockoutmouse.

== Standards in macrophage-related research ==
Murray has advocated for improved standards in research involving activated macrophages. Together with Alberto Mantovani, Thomas A. Wynn and many other collaborators and colleagues working to understand macrophage biology, Murray proposed basic experimental and reporting standards to describe the complexity of macrophage polarization in vitro and in vivo. These three key papers have been collectively cited over 13,000 times.
