= Lisa LaPorta =

American interior designer

Lisa LaPorta is an interior designer in Los Angeles who has appeared on several HGTV reality programs including Designed to Sell, Designers' Challenge, and Designing for the Sexes.

== Education ==
LaPorta received her professional training in design from the UCLA Department of Environmental Art and Design. Lisa has been featured on the many HGTV television shows including

- Designers Challenge,
- Designing for the Sexes,
- Designed to Sell,
- Home for the Holidays,
- Design Star,
- Showdown,
- Summer Showdown,
- Bang for your Buck,
- 25 Biggest Renovation Mistakes,
- 25 Biggest Selling Mistakes,
- and First Time Design.
