= Sarah Gaffen =

American immunologist

Sarah L. Gaffen
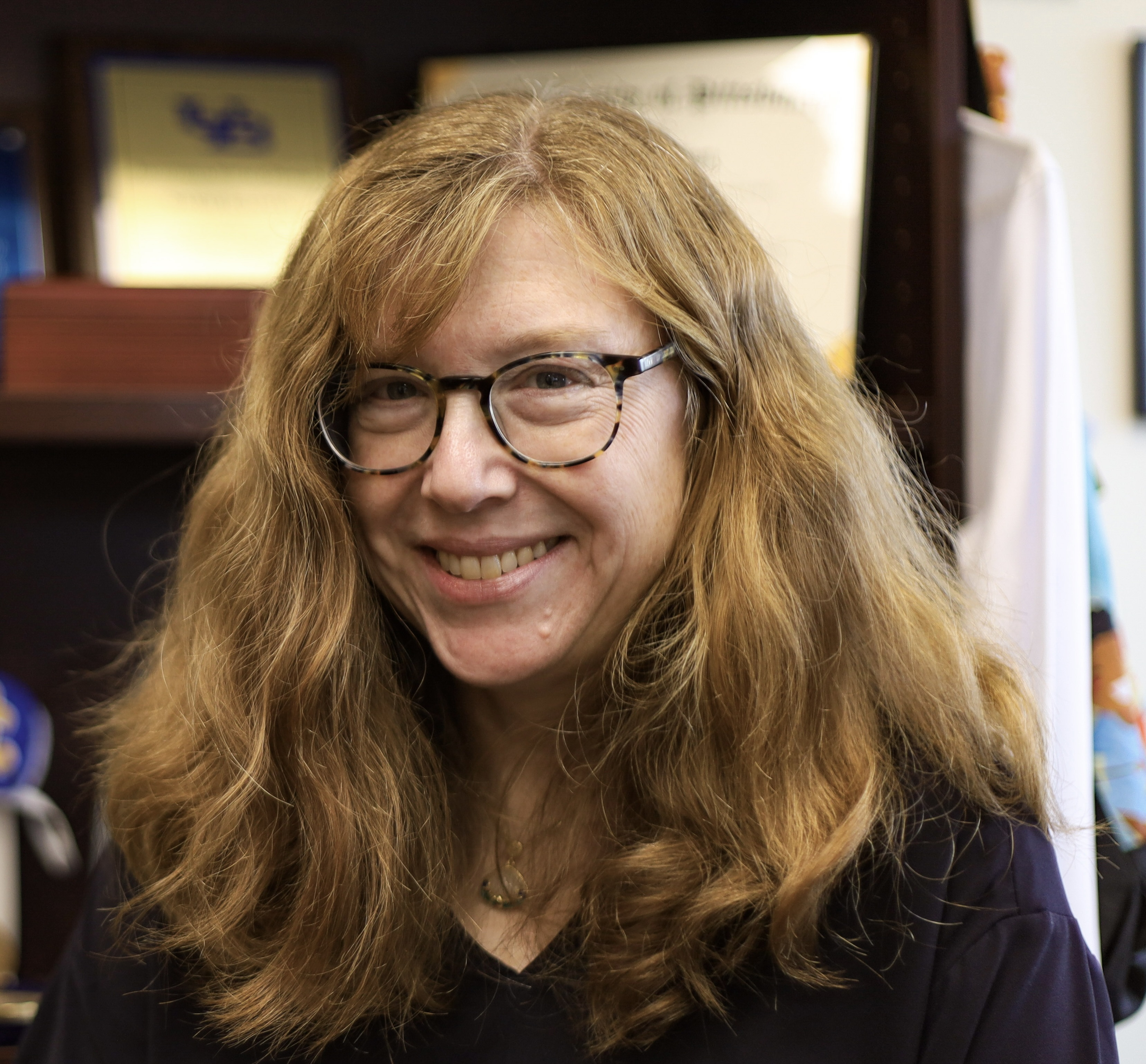
- Dr.Sarah L. Gaffen
- Education: Carnegie Mellon University; University of California, Berkeley
- Known for: Research on cytokines and fungal immunity, particularly interleukin-17 (IL-17)
- Awards: NIH MERIT Award (R37); University of Pittsburgh Chancellor’s Distinguished Senior Scholar Award (2018); International Cytokine and Interferon Society/BioLegend William E. Paul Award (2020); Alumni Achievement Award, Carnegie Mellon University (2025); Distinguished Fellow, American Association of Immunologists; Honorary Fellow of the AAAS and American Society of Microbiology
- Scientific career
- Fields: Immunology, Rheumatology
- Workplaces: University of Pittsburgh
- Doctoral advisor: Marian Koshland

Sarah L. Gaffen is an American immunologist. Gaffen is a Professor of Medicine and Director of Basic Rheumatology Research in the Division of Rheumatology and Clinical Immunology at the University of Pittsburgh School of Medicine.

== Education and career ==
Gaffen received a B.S. in Biological Sciences from Carnegie Mellon University in Pittsburgh, PA. She received a PhD in 1994 from the University of California at Berkeley under the supervision of Dr. Marian Koshland in the Department of Molecular and Cellular Biology. She did postdoctoral work at the Gladstone Institute for Virology and Immunology at University of California at San Francisco (UCSF) with Warner Greene and Mark Goldsmith. Gaffen was an Assistant and Associate Professor at the State University of New York at Buffalo in the Department of Oral Biology from 1999-2008, after which she moved to the University of Pittsburgh. She is a Professor in the Division of Rheumatology and Clinical Immunology, where she holds the Gerald P. Rodnan endowed chair. Gaffen also holds a secondary faculty appointment in the Department of Immunology. Gaffen served as President of the International Cytokine and Interferon Society from 2023-2025.

== Research ==
Gaffen is known for her research on cytokines and fungal immunity, particularly interleukin-17 (IL-17). Her group conducts research on the fundamental biology of cytokine signal transduction and how this applies to disease conditions where IL-17 plays a key role. In 2009, Gaffen’s team published results that signaling by the IL-17 receptor and IL-17-producing lymphocytes is essential to prevent opportunistic Candida albicans mucosal infections. Her team showed that IL-17 antifungal responses occur in the oral mucosa, and that the fungal toxin candidalysinis essential to activate early IL-17 responses to candidiasis. In autoimmune settings, Gaffen’s group identified roles for IL-17-inducible transcription factors and posttranscriptional pathways mediated by RNA binding proteins in inflammatory pathology.

== Awards and honors ==
As a Ph.D. student at University of California at Berkeley, Gaffen was supported by a National Science Foundation fellowship, and her postdoctoral work was supported by the A.P. Giannini Foundation. Gaffen holds an NIH MERIT award (R37). She was recognized with the University of Pittsburgh Chancellor’s Distinguished Senior Scholar Award in 2018, and is an Honorary Fellow of the AAAS and American Society of Microbiology. She received the 2020 International Cytokine and Interferon Society/BioLegend William E. Paul Award. She was an invited speaker at the 2021 University of Pittsburgh School of Medicine commencement. In 2025 she was a recipient of an Alumni Achievement Award from Carnegie Mellon University.. She was named a 2026 Distinguished Fellow of the American Association of Immunologists.

== Selected publications ==
- Gaffen SL, Lai S, Xu W, Gouilleux F, Groner B, Goldsmith MA, Greene WC. Signaling through the IL-2R chain activates a STAT-5-like DNA binding activity. Proc Natl Acad Sci, USA 1995; 92:7192-7196
- Ruddy MJ, Wong GC, Liu XK, Yamamoto H, Kasayama S, Kirkwood KL, Gaffen SL. Functional cooperation between interleukin-17 and tumor necrosis factor-alpha is mediated by CCAAT/enhancer-binding protein family members. J Biol Chem, 2004; 279:2559-2567.
- Conti HR, Shen F, Nayyar N, Stocum E, Sun JN, Lindemann MJ, Ho AW, Hai JH, Yu JJ, Jung JW, Filler SG, Masso-Welch P, Edgerton M, Gaffen SL. Th17 cells and IL-17 receptor signaling are essential for mucosal host defense against oral candidiasis. J Exp Med, 2009; 206:299-311.
- Conti HR, Bruno VM, Childs EC, Daugherty S, Hunter JP, Mengesha BG, Saevig DL, Hendricks MR, Coleman BM, Brane L, Solis N, Cruz JA, Verma AH, Garg AV, Hise AG, Richardson JP, Naglik JR, Filler SG, Kolls JK, Sinha S, Gaffen SL. IL-17RA signaling in oral epithelium is critical for protection against oropharyngeal candidiasis. Cell Host & Microbe, 2016; 20:606-617.
- Li X, Bechara R, Zhao J, McGeachy MJ, Gaffen SL. IL-17 receptor based signaling and implications for diseases. Nature Immunol, 2019; 20:1594-1602.
- Bechara R, Amatya N, Bailey RD, Li Y, Aggor FEY, Li D, Jawale CV, Coleman BM, Dai N, Gokhale NS, Taylor TC, Horner SM, Poholek AC, Bansal A, Biswas PS, Gaffen SL*. RNA m6A methylation guides IL-17-driven autoimmunity through IMP2-dependent regulation of C/EBP transcription factors. Science Immunology, 2021; 6:eabd1287.
- Li Y, Vyas SP, Mehta I, Asada N, Dey I, Taylor TC, Bechara R, Amatya N, Aggor FEY, Coleman BM, Li D, Yamamoto K, Ezenwa O, Sun Y, Sterneck E, McManus CJ, Panzer U, Biswas PS, Savan R, Das J, Gaffen SL*. The RNA binding protein Arid5a drives IL-17-dependent autoantibody-induced glomerulonephritis. J Exp Med, 2024; 221:e20240656.
