= Curb Appeal =

- Genre: Reality, home improvement
- Starring: Bill Beckwith, Kimberly Lacy, John Gidding
- Country of origin: United States
- Original language: English
- No. of seasons: 26
- No. of episodes: 338

Production
- Running time: 30 minutes

Original release
- Network: HGTV
- Release: September 30, 1999 – September 21, 2013

Curb Appeal was a half-hour television series that aired on HGTV in the United States from September 30, 1999 to September 21, 2013, exploring how a house's outside "curb appeal" will be updated. Various hosts over the years (including Sasha Andreev), talk the viewer through the planned improvements. Originally the new look was imagined by drawing the proposed changes over a still picture of the exterior but now computer-generated visualizations are created. Changes include painting, landscaping, and fences, as well as pruning or removing overgrown shrubs, and sometimes cutting down trees.

John Gidding was the only remaining host in 2013 and more recent episodes involve multiple homes on a San Francisco Bay Area block, and were titled Curb Appeal. There has also been at least one hour-long Christmas special, A Very Merry Curb Appeal, with two homes adorned with Christmas decorations.
