= John Gidding =

Turkish-American architect

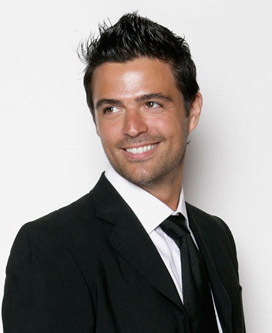
- Born: January 7, 1977 (age 49); Istanbul, Turkey
- Occupations: Television personality, designer, model
- Years active: 2000–present
- Spouse: Damian Smith (m. 2013, divorced)

John Gidding (born January 7, 1977) is a Turkish-American designer, television personality, and former fashion model.

Gidding started modeling in 2000 as a graduate student, performing runway shows for Armani, Gucci, and Hugo Boss before being represented by Wilhelmina Models in New York City. Before entering the design profession, Gidding was the spokesmodel for Jhane Barnes in 2004 and 2005. He has also been on the covers of numerous romance novels.

He was voted one of "Yale's 50 Most Beautiful People" in 1999 by Rumpus Magazine, one of "Boston's 50 Most Eligible Bachelors" by The Improper Bostonian in 2002, one of "Atlanta's 50 Most Beautiful People" by Jezebel Magazine and as one of Atlanta Homes and Lifestyles's "Emerging Talent: Twenty Under 40" in 2008.

== Biography ==
Gidding was born in Istanbul, Turkey, to an American father and a Turkish mother.

He lived in Turkey until moving to the United States for college after attending Leysin American School in Leysin, Switzerland. He graduated from Yale University in 1999 with a BA in architecture, then the Harvard Graduate School of Design with a Master's in architecture. At Yale he sang a cappella with The Society of Orpheus and Bacchus, and choral music with the Yale Glee Club, and at Harvard he sang with the Harvard-Radcliffe Collegium Musicum.

Gidding moved to New York City, where he started John Gidding Design, Inc. after working for two years as a designer for Michael Van Valkenburgh Associates.

Gidding's start in television was with the ABC Family TV show Knock First, where he and three other designers took turns making over teenagers' bedrooms. Designed to Sell (Giddings' previous show from 2006 to 2011) was cancelled in early 2011 by HGTV, and Knock First is still running in syndication internationally.

He is best known as the designer on Curb Appeal: The Block where his team spent $20,000 on improvements to the exterior and landscaping of chosen homeowners. Less expensive touch-ups were done for 2 or 3 nearby neighbors' homes to improve overall neighborhood property values. In 2015 he was one of the expert judges on the Fox TV show Home Free. He joined the reboot of Trading Spaces, joining the cast alongside Paige Davis and Vern Yip. He is currently back on HGTV, with a relaunch of the popular franchise, Curb Appeal Xtreme.

== Personal life ==
Gidding was married to ballet dancer Damian Smith. The two later divorced.
