= Cytokine (journal) =

- Discipline: Immunology, biochemistry
- Language: English
- Edited by: Dhan Kalvakolanu

Publication details
- History: 1989-present
- Publisher: Elsevier
- Frequency: Monthly
- Impact factor: 3.488 (2016)

Standard abbreviations
- ISO 4: Cytokine

Indexing
- CODEN: CYTIE9
- ISSN: 1043-4666 (print); 1096-0023 (web)
- LCCN: 2004206224
- OCLC no.: 19480996

Links
- Journal homepage; Online archive

Cytokine is a monthly peer-reviewed academic journal covering the study of cytokines as they relate to multiple disciplines, including molecular biology, immunology, and genetics. It was established in 1989 and is published by Elsevier. The editor-in-chief is Dhan Kalvakolanu (University of Maryland School of Medicine). According to the Journal Citation Reports, the journal has a 2016 impact factor of 3.488 .
