= Curb appeal =

Attractiveness of a property as viewed from the street

Curb appeal is attractiveness of the exterior of a residential or commercial property, as viewed from the street. The term was extensively used in the United States during the housing boom and continues to be used as an indicator of the initial appeal of a property to prospective buyers.

== Methods for increasing curb appeal ==
Curb appeal can be accomplished by any number of methods including the installation of exterior decorations, re-painting, or extensive attention to the landscaping. Several television programs have been created to explore ways for homeowners and building contractors to increase the curb appeal of their properties for a more profitable sale.

== See also ==
- Home staging
