= Illinois Route 171 =

State highway in Will and Cook Counties, Illinois, US

Illinois Route 171
- IL 171 highlighted in red

Route information
- Maintained by IDOT and CDOT
- Length: 38.61 mi (62.14 km)
- Existed: 1946–present

Major junctions
- South end: US 6 in Joliet
- I-355 Toll near Lockport; US 12 / US 20 / US 45 in Willow Springs I-294 Toll in Justice; I-55 in Summit; US 34 in Lyons I-290 / IL 110 (CKC) in Maywood; I-90 in Chicago
- North end: IL 72 in Chicago

Location
- Country: United States
- State: Illinois
- Counties: Will, Cook

Highway system
- Illinois State Highway System; Interstate; US; State; Tollways; Scenic
← IL 170	→ I-172

Illinois Route 171 (IL 171) is a 38.61-mile-long (62.14 km) north–south state highway in northeastern Illinois. It runs from U.S. Route 6 (US 6) in Joliet north to Illinois Route 72 at the Chicago–Park Ridge border. The section of IL 171 on Archer Avenue from Joliet to Summit is historically significant, originating as a Native American trail, and later serving for a time as part of the first numbered highway between St. Louis and Chicago.

The current Illinois Route 171 incorporates part or all of previous IL 4, IL 4A, and IL 213.

== Route description ==
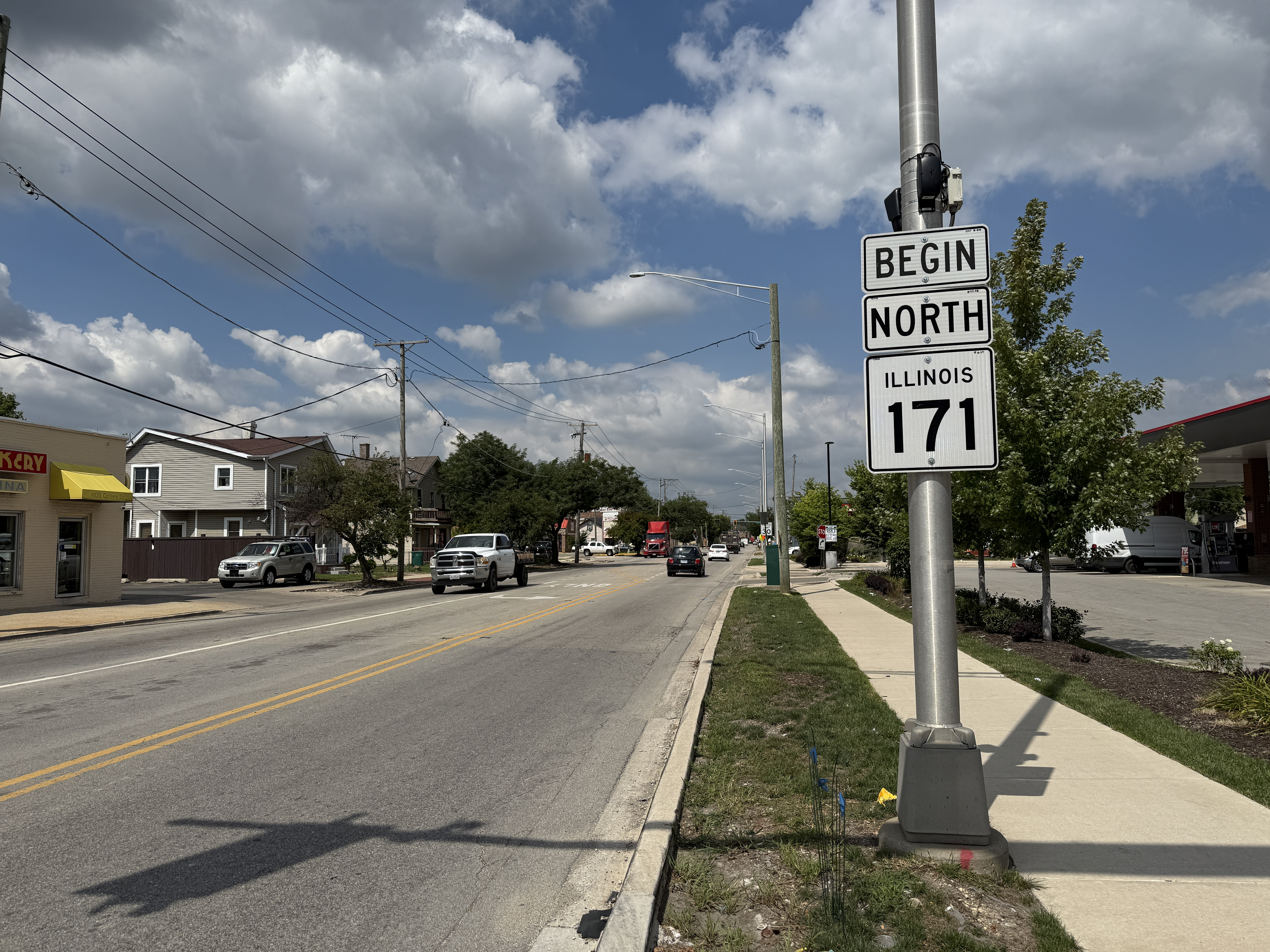
IL 171 northbound past southern terminus at US 6 in Joliet

IL 171 is mostly two lanes wide from Joliet to Willow Springs, and then four lanes wide to its northern endpoint in Chicago. It is a four-lane freeway for about 2 miles (3.2 km), from its intersection with West 55th Street and Archer Avenue in Summit, to its intersection with West 44th Place in Lyons.

=== Joliet to Lockport ===
IL 171 begins in Joliet as Collins Street, at an intersection with US 6 which is East Jackson Street. On its way out of town, it passes the historic Joliet Correctional Center, used as a location in several television shows and movies including The Blues Brothers. From Joliet to Lockport, it parallels the Des Plaines River, and IL 53 (which had formerly been US 66) on the other side of the river. It passes through historic Downtown Lockport as State Street, intersecting IL 7 at 9th Street.

=== Lockport to Summit ===
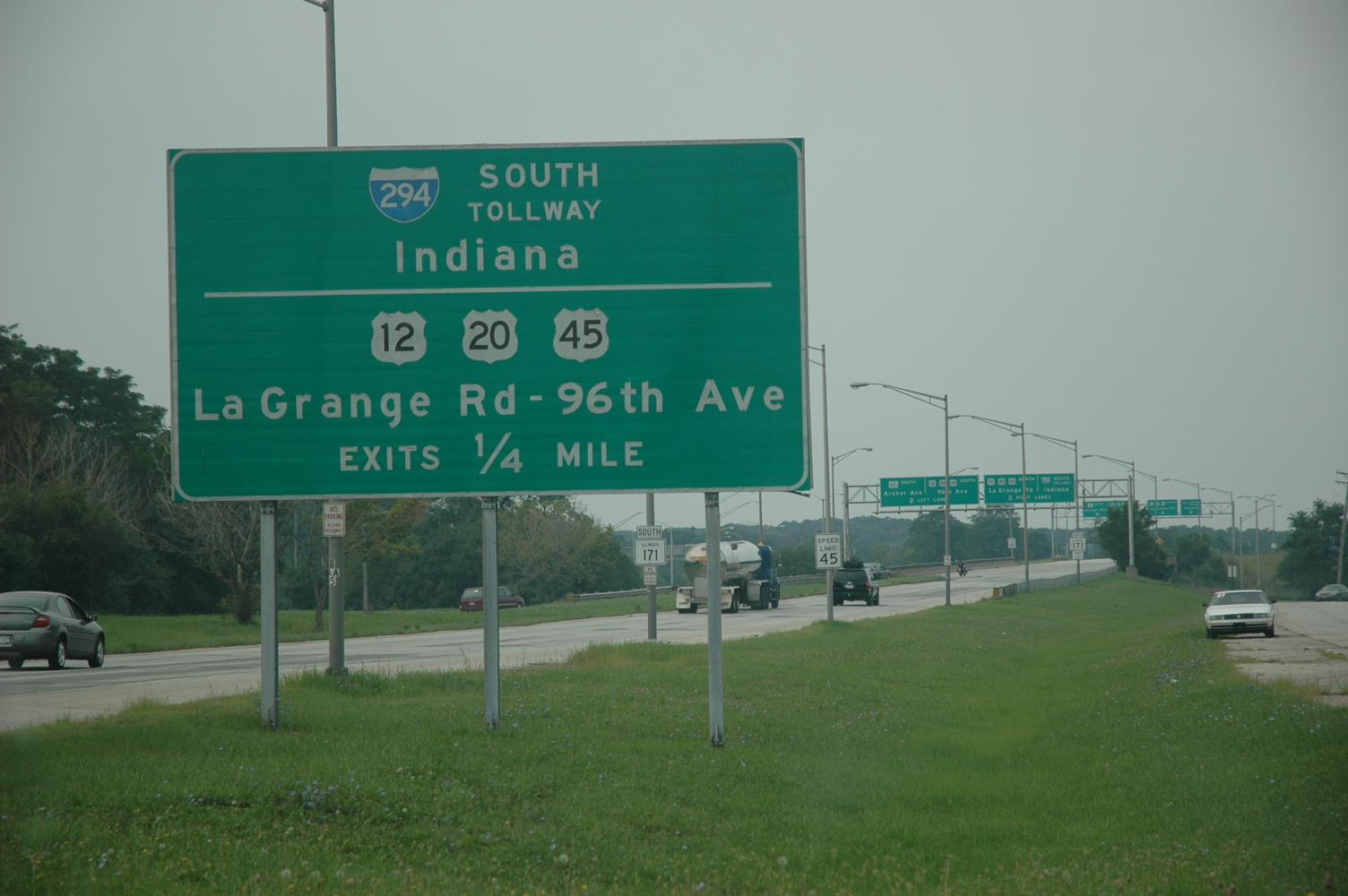
Northbound IL 171 in Willow Springs approaching US 12/US 20/US 45 and I-294

On the north side of Lockport, IL 171 bends northeast onto Archer Avenue. It intersects Interstate 355 (I-355, Veterans Memorial Tollway) just south of Lemont. At the community of Sag Bridge, it is joined by IL 83, and the two routes run concurrently for about one mile (1.6 km) to cross the Calumet Sag Channel on the Archer Avenue Bridge. The two routes split again immediately north of the bridge, as IL 83 continues north while IL 171 resumes its northeastward course, passing St. James at Sag Bridge Church and Cemetery, listed on the National Register of Historic Places. It then makes a scenic passage through the Palos Division of the Forest Preserve District of Cook County, a very large natural preserve. Leaving the forest preserve, it passes through the village of Willow Springs which was built strung out along the road. IL 171 has a complex interchange with US 12/US 20/US 45 (LaGrange Road) and I-294 (Tri-State Tollway) on the border between Willow Springs and Justice. At this point, it begins to parallel two roads to the east, Illinois Route 43 and Illinois Route 50. It will parallel these two roads for the rest of its route. It continues northeastward through Justice, passing Bethania and Resurrection Cemeteries. It then passes through small sections of Bridgeview and Bedford Park on its way into Summit.

=== Summit to Chicago ===
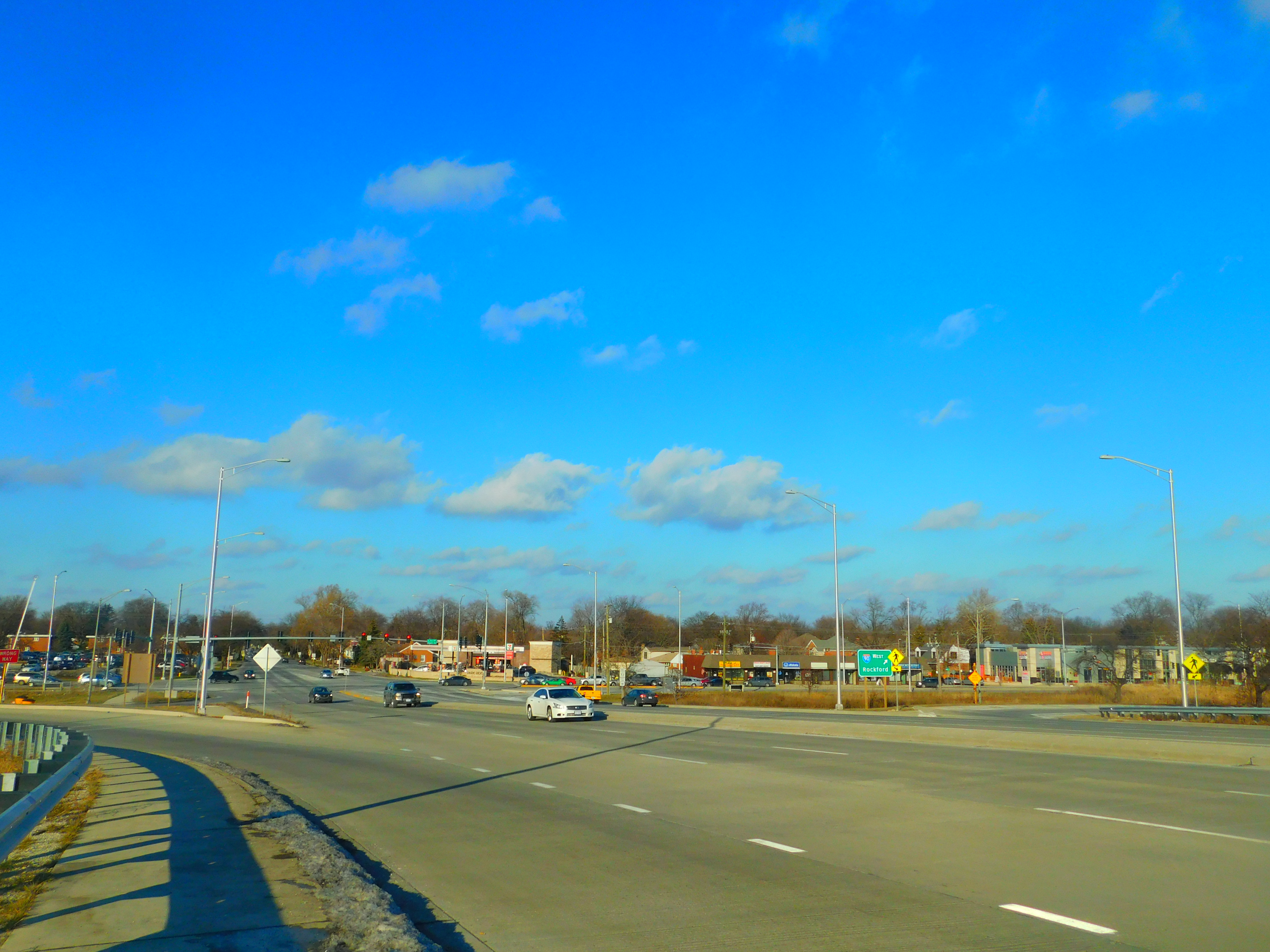
IL 171 approaching IL 72 in Chicago

At an intersection with West 55th Street in Summit, IL 171 bends sharply to the north, becoming a freeway for about two miles (3.2 km), crossing the Illinois and Michigan Canal, the Chicago Sanitary and Ship Canal, the Stevenson Expressway (I-55), and the Des Plaines River at a cloverleaf interchange whose ramps had to be built as bridges over these watercourses due to their close proximity to I-55. It then enters McCook and has interchanges with Joliet Road (Historic US 66), and West 47th Street at the border between McCook and Lyons, before the freeway ends at West 44th Place in Lyons. Continuing as First Avenue, IL 171 intersects US 34 at Ogden Avenue, and passes to the east of Brookfield Zoo in Brookfield. Continuing north into Maywood, it passes Loyola University Medical Center before intersecting I-290 (Eisenhower Expressway). It continues north through Melrose Park where it intersects IL 64 at North Avenue, and River Grove, where its name changes to Thatcher Avenue. At West Belmont Avenue, it enters the City of Chicago, becoming North Cumberland Avenue, at 8400 West in the Chicago address system. It intersects IL 19 at Irving Park Road. A half-mile further north, it enters the village of Norridge for just over one mile. It then has a cloverleaf interchange with I-90 (Kennedy Expressway) before ending at IL 72 (Higgins Road), at the border between Chicago and Park Ridge, near O'Hare Airport.

== History ==
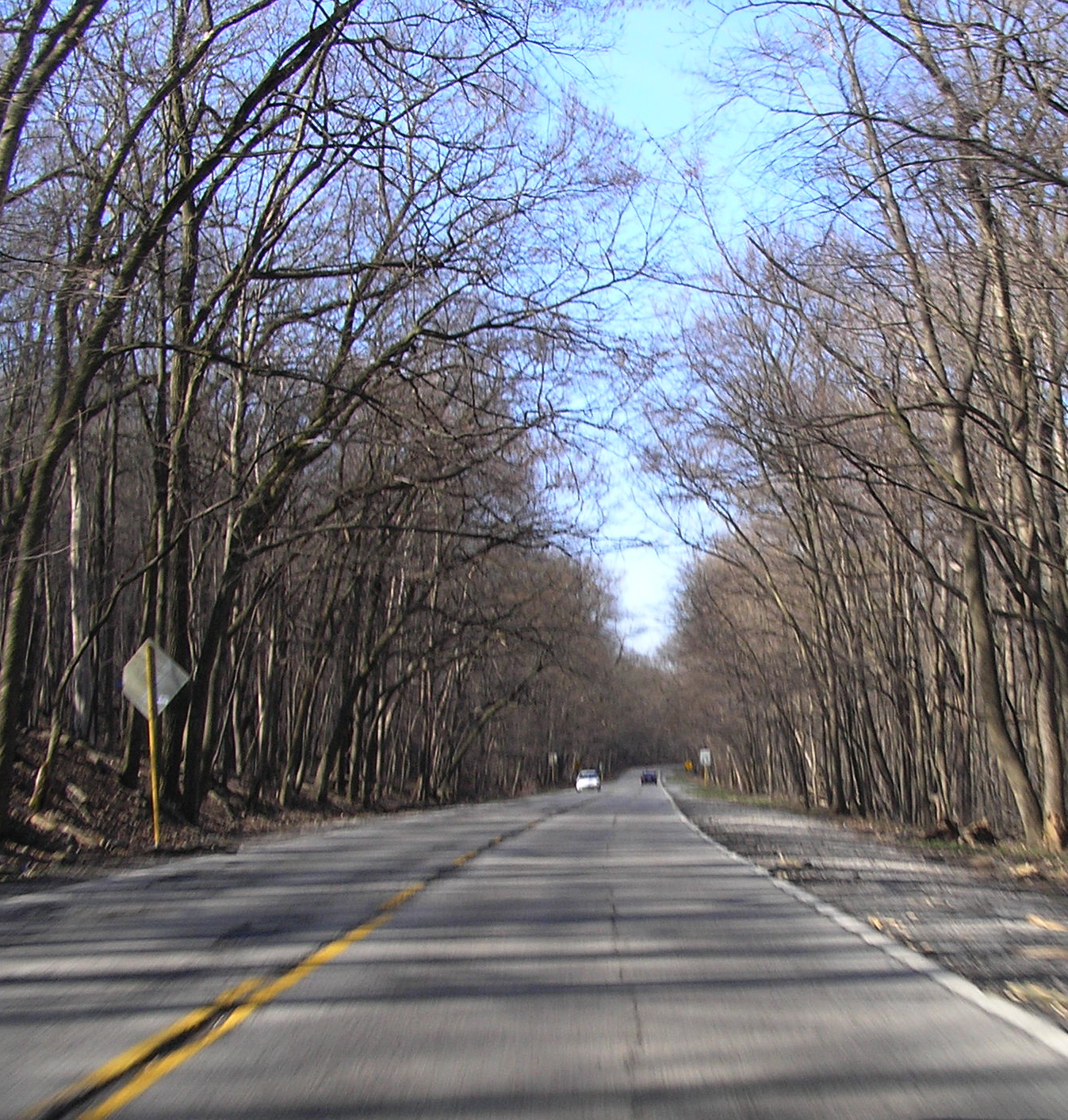
Scenic section of IL 171 in the Palos Forest Preserve

=== Before automobiles ===
The route followed by IL 171 from Joliet to Summit was originally a Native American trail. It can be found on a map from 1837. This original trail continued northeast beyond Summit around the southern shore of historic Mud Lake as a dry land route past the marshy Chicago Portage, ending where Downtown Chicago is now. This ancient trail is known today as Archer Avenue.

=== Original S.B.I. 171 ===
Illinois State Bond Issue Route 171 (S.B.I. 171) was established in 1924 in the northwestern part of the state, and ran from Thomson to S.B.I. 78, along what is now called the Argo-Fay Route. This first IL 171 appeared on maps starting in 1929, but was gone by 1931 and never reappeared on this alignment.

=== Original S.B.I. 4 ===
The first road from Joliet to Chicago was shown as "Lone Star Route" on early road maps. In 1924 S.B.I. 4 was designated as the first numbered route from Saint Louis to Chicago. From Joliet to Lyons, the original S.B.I 4 followed the route of modern IL 171, along Archer Avenue, except for a jog through Lemont on State and Main streets to bypass an unpaved section of Archer Avenue. It then rejoined Archer Avenue at Sag Bridge. At Summit, the original S.B.I. 4 continued along the modern alignment of IL 171 north to Lyons, where S.B.I. 4 turned east on Ogden Avenue towards Chicago.

=== Routes 4A and 213 ===
In 1926, a new alignment for the Saint Louis to Chicago through highway was opened as IL 4 on the northwest side of the Des Plaines River from Joliet to Lyons. This new alignment would later become US 66 and then I-55. Its previous alignment on Archer Avenue was renumbered as IL 4A. By 1932, Archer Avenue was completely paved, so IL 4A no longer detoured through Lemont.

In 1934, IL 4A was extended east into Chicago along 55th Street and Garfield Boulevard to South Park Boulevard (now called Martin Luther King Jr. Drive), where it turned north to end at Leif Erickson Drive (now called Lake Shore Drive), which was US 12/US 20/US 41 at the time. This 1934 endpoint was roughly at the site of today's McCormick Place.

The next year, the 1935 map shows that the section of former IL 4A from Summit to Lyons had been designated as IL 213. It also shows IL 4A truncated to the intersection of Garfield Boulevard and South Park Boulevard, which had been designated US 330. By 1939 IL 4A had been rerouted from 55th Street, more directly into Downtown Chicago on Archer Avenue. In 1935, IL 4, IL 4A's parent route, was truncated to end at Springfield, having been replaced by US 66 from Springfield to Chicago. This left IL 4A from Joliet to Chicago as an odd remote orphan of its Downstate parent route until it was eliminated in 1967.

=== Modern Route 171 ===
In 1946, IL 213 was renumbered IL 171, still connecting IL 4A in Summit to US 34 in Lyons. This is the first appearance of the modern IL 171. In the mid-1960s, as part of the construction of the new Stevenson Expressway, IL 171 was upgraded to a freeway between Summit and Lyons, including its interchange with I-55. In 1967, IL 4A was eliminated, and its section between Joliet and Summit became a southern extension of IL 171. In 1998, IL 171 was extended northward through several suburban communities and the Northwest Side of Chicago, crossing I-290 and I-90, to end at IL 72 (Higgins Road) on the border between Chicago and Park Ridge near O'Hare Airport.

=== Claims of supernatural occurrences ===
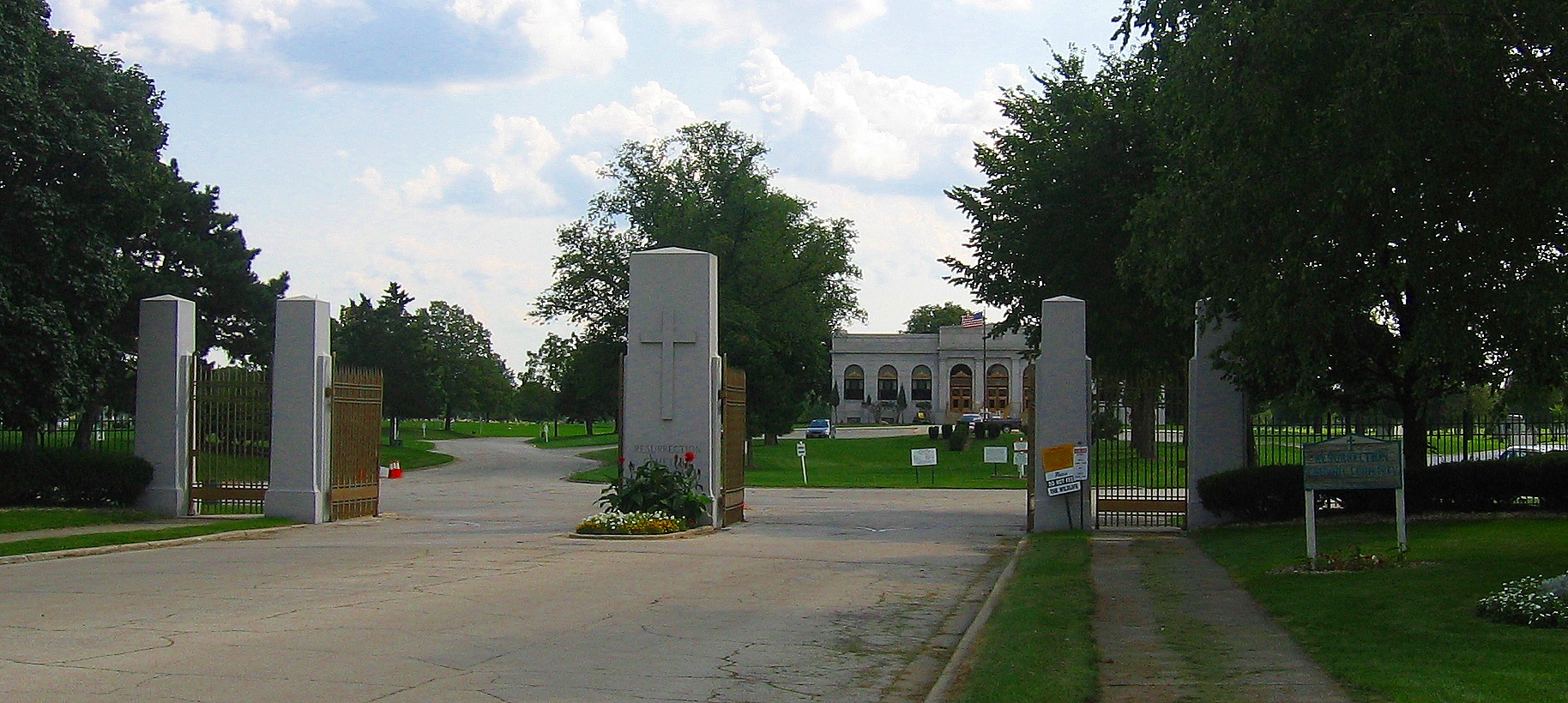
The main gate of Resurrection Cemetery on Archer Avenue, reputedly the home of Resurrection Mary

The section of IL 171 on Archer Avenue between Sag Bridge and Justice is reputed to be haunted. There have been reports of ghostly monks in the cemetery at St. James at Sag Bridge Church since the mid-1800s; in 1977 police are said to have chased a group of them into the cemetery. A vanishing hitchhiker known as Resurrection Mary is said to ask for rides between the Willowbrook Ballroom in Willow Springs and Resurrection Cemetery in Justice - and then disappear into the cemetery.

== Major intersections ==
County	Location	mi	km	Destinations	Notes
Will	Joliet	0.00	0.00	US 6 (Jackson Street / Collins Street) to US 30	Southern terminus
Will	Lockport	4.1	6.6	IL 7 (9th Street) / I&M Canal Passage west	South end of I&M Canal Passage overlap
Will	Lockport	5.0	8.0	I&M Canal Passage east (New Avenue)	North end of I&M Canal Passage overlap
Will	Lockport	7.4	11.9	CR 37 east (143rd Street)	
Will	Lockport	8.1	13.0	I-355 Toll (Veterans Memorial Tollway) – Southwest Suburbs, West Suburbs	I-355 exit 7
Will	Homer Township	8.6	13.8	I&M Canal Passage west (135th Street)	South end of I&M Canal Passage overlap
Cook	Lemont	9.0	14.5	I&M Canal Passage east (State Street)	North end of I&M Canal Passage overlap
Cook	Sag Bridge	13.8	22.2	IL 83 south (111th Street)	South end of IL 83 overlap
Cook	Sag Bridge	14.6	23.5	IL 83 north (Kingery Highway)	North end of IL 83 overlap
Cook	Willow Springs	20.1	32.3	US 12 / US 20 / US 45 (La Grange Road)	Interchange
Cook	Justice	20.6	33.2	I-294 Toll south (Tri-State Tollway) – Indiana	Access to southbound I-294 only
Cook	Justice	20.7	33.3	79th Street	Interchange; northbound exit and southbound entrance
Cook	Summit	24.2	38.9	Southern end of the freeway section at West 55th Street/Archer Avenue	
Cook	Summit	24.9	40.1	I-55 (Stevenson Expressway) – Chicago, St. Louis	I-55 exit 282
Cook	McCook	25.5	41.0	Historic US 66 (Joliet Road)	
Cook	Lyons	26.1	42.0	West 47th Street	
Cook	Lyons	26.4	42.5	Northern end of the freeway section at West 44th Place	
Cook	Lyons	26.8	43.1	US 34 (Ogden Avenue)	
Cook	Maywood	30.8	49.6	I-290 / IL 110 (CKC) (Eisenhower Expressway)	I-290 exit 20
Cook	Melrose Park	33.3	53.6	IL 64 (North Avenue)	
Cook	Chicago	36.4	58.6	IL 19 (Irving Park Road)	
Cook	Chicago	38.5	62.0	I-90 (Kennedy Expressway) to I-190 west – Chicago, O'Hare, Rockford	I-90 exit 79
Cook	Chicago	38.6	62.1	IL 72 (Higgins Road)	Northern terminus
1.000 mi = 1.609 km; 1.000 km = 0.621 mi: Concurrency terminus; Incomplete access
