= Martin Gorski =

American politician

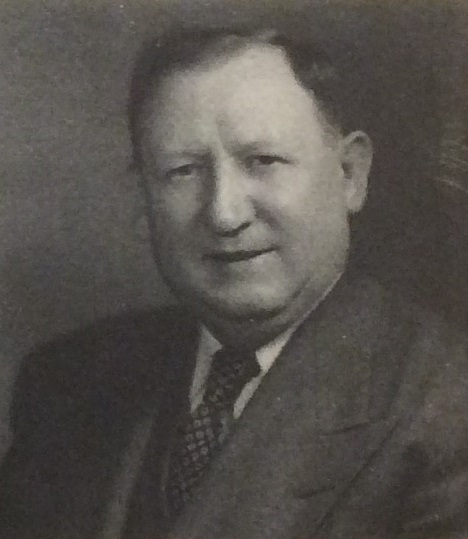
- From 1949's Pictorial Directory of the 81st Congress

Member of the U.S. House of Representatives from Illinois
- In office January 3, 1943 – December 4, 1949
- Preceded by: Harry P. Beam (4th); Adolph J. Sabath (5th)
- Succeeded by: James V. Buckley (4th); John C. Kluczynski (5th)
- Constituency: 4th district (1943-49); 5th district (1949)

Personal details
- Born: October 30, 1886 Poland
- Died: December 4, 1949 (aged 63) Chicago, Illinois, U.S.
- Party: Democratic

Martin Gorski (October 30, 1886 – December 4, 1949) was an American politician who served in the United States House of Representatives from 1943 to 1949, representing Illinois.

== Early life and career ==
Born in Poland, Gorski immigrated in 1889 to the United States with his parents, who settled in Chicago, Illinois. Gorski graduated from business college and from Chicago (Illinois) Law School in 1917. He was admitted to the bar in 1917 and set up a practice in Chicago, Illinois. Gorski served as assistant State's attorney 1918-1920 and then he served as master in chancery of the Superior Court of Cook County from 1929 to 1942.

== Tenure in Congress ==
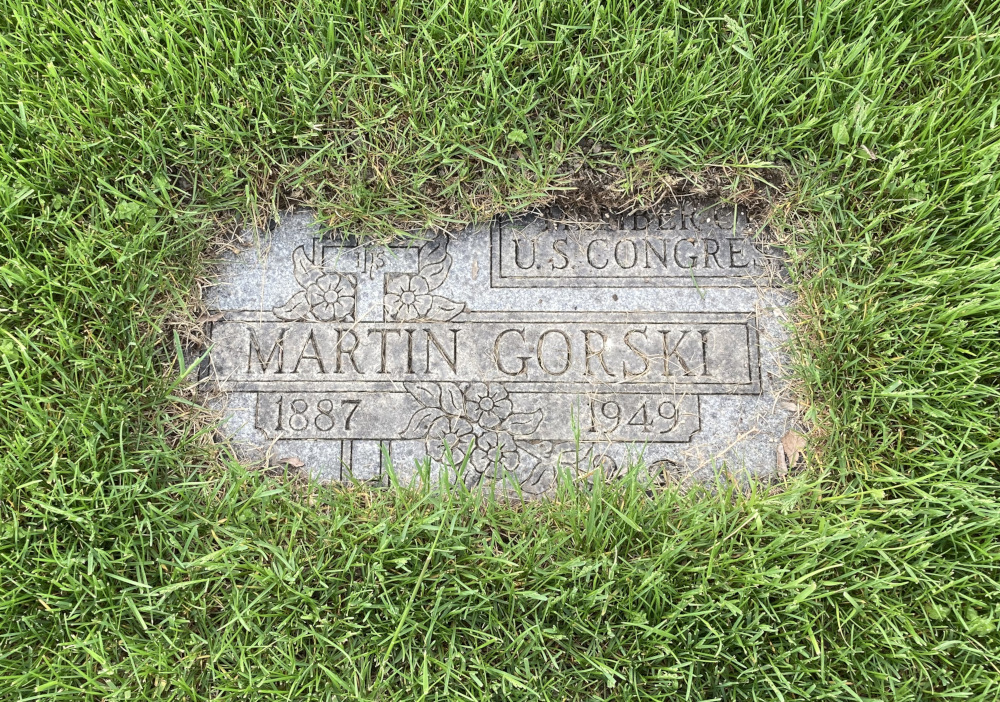
Gorski's grave at Resurrection Cemetery

Gorski was elected as a Democrat to the Seventy-eighth, Seventy-ninth, Eightieth and Eighty-first Congresses and served from January 3, 1943, until his death on December 4, 1949. He was interred in Resurrection Cemetery in Justice, Illinois.

== See also ==
- List of members of the United States Congress who died in office (1900–1949)

U.S. House of Representatives
Preceded by Harry P. Beam	Member of the U.S. House of Representatives from Illinois's 4th congressional district January 3, 1943 - January 3, 1949	Succeeded by James V. Buckley
Preceded by Adolph J. Sabath	Member of the U.S. House of Representatives from Illinois's 5th congressional district January 3, 1949 - December 4, 1949	Succeeded by John C. Kluczynski
