= School District 109 =

School District 109 may refer to:

- Indian Springs School District 109
- Deerfield Public School District 109
