= Resurrection Cemetery (Justice, Illinois) =

Cemetery in Justice, Illinois, United States

Resurrection Catholic Cemetery
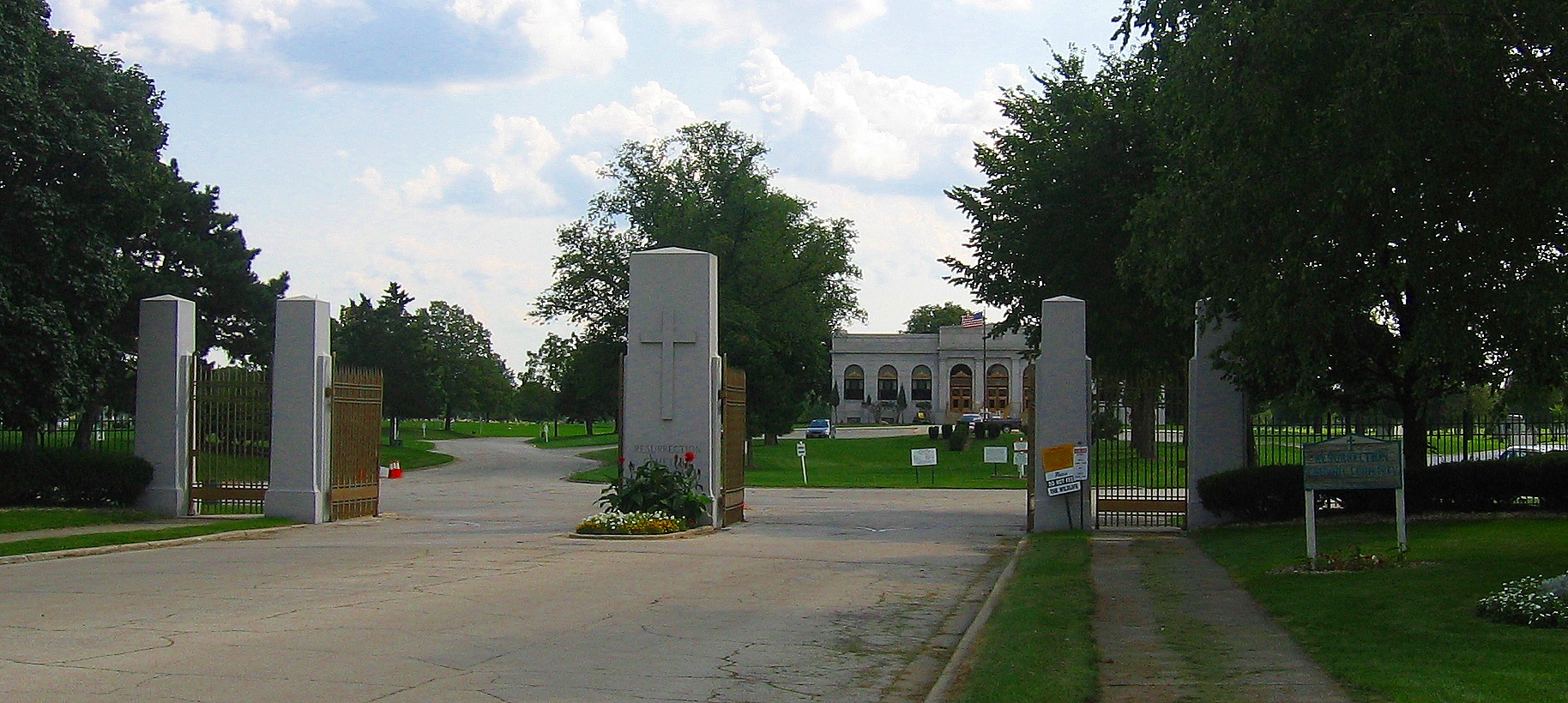
- Main gate on Archer Avenue
- Interactive map of Resurrection Catholic Cemetery

Details
- Established: 1904
- Location: 7201 Archer Road S. Justice, Illinois
- Coordinates: 41°45′35″N 87°49′39″W
- Type: Catholic
- Owned by: Archdiocese of Chicago
- Size: 397 acres (161 ha)
- No. of interments: 225,000
- Website: Official website
- Find a Grave: Resurrection Catholic Cemetery

Resurrection Catholic Cemetery is a Roman Catholic cemetery in Justice, Illinois, a south suburb of the Chicago metro area. Consecrated in 1904, the cemetery is maintained and owned by the Archdiocese of Chicago. Resurrection is the reputed resting place of Resurrection Mary, topic of a popular Chicago ghost story.

In 1969, Resurrection Mausoleum was constructed in the cemetery grounds. The 22,381 square feet stained glass window of the mausoleum, completed in 1971, is recognized by Guinness World Records as the largest in the world. The 2,400 panels of the glass depict the history of man's salvation, from the creation of man, until the second coming of Christ.

== Visit by Pope John Paul II ==
In 1969 prior to his papacy as a Cardinal, Pope John Paul II visited the cemetery once in 1969 during his time as Archbishop of Kraków, Poland to bless the Polish Millennium Shrine which celebrated the 1,000th anniversary of Christianity in Poland. He visited again in 1979 with 15 other Polish Bishops to tour the mausoleum which honors the history of Polish Christianity.

In 1983 a small indoor mausoleum was dedicated to Pope John Paul II opened contains 275 crypts and photos and memorabilia of the Pope's 1979 visit. On Memorial Day 2016 Archbishop of Chicago Blase Cupich celebrated Mass and blessed the 20 ft tall statue of John Paul II in front of 2,500 people. The statue stands on top of a 86,000 Lbs. of Black Granite Base and Catholic Cemeteries of Chicago commissioned Teresa Clark in 2013 for the statue.

== Architecture ==
Resurrection Mausoleum is an Art-Deco styled 3 story building built in 1969 by a small pond in the cemetery that has the world's largest amount of stain glass windows 2,448 to be exact. With the stained glass showing scenes of mankind's story on Earth from Dinosaurs and the Garden of Eden to Noah's Ark and an airplane flying and a mushroom cloud.

== Notable interments ==
- Victims of the Eastland Disaster (1915)
- Helen Repa (died 1938), SS Eastland first responder and heroine.
- A. F. Maciejewski (died 1942), U.S. representative
- Martin Gorski (died 1949), politician
- Edward C. Krzyzowski (died 1951), Medal of Honor recipient
- Arthur F. Albert (died 1970), Chicago alderman
- John C. Kluczynski (died 1975), U.S. representative
- Ron Haydock (died 1977), actor and rock musician
- Tony Piet (died 1981), baseball player
- John G. Fary (died 1984), U.S. Representative from Illinois
- Ray Jablonski (died 1985), American baseball player
- Johnny Ostrowski (died 1992), baseball player
- Eugene Record (died 2005), singer, songwriter
- Joe Krupa (died 2011), football player
- Ted Lapka (died 2011), football player
- Eddie Blazonczyk (died 2012), American polka musician
