= St. James Catholic Church and Cemetery (Lemont, Illinois) =

Historic site in Cook County, Illinois, US

- U.S. National Register of Historic Places
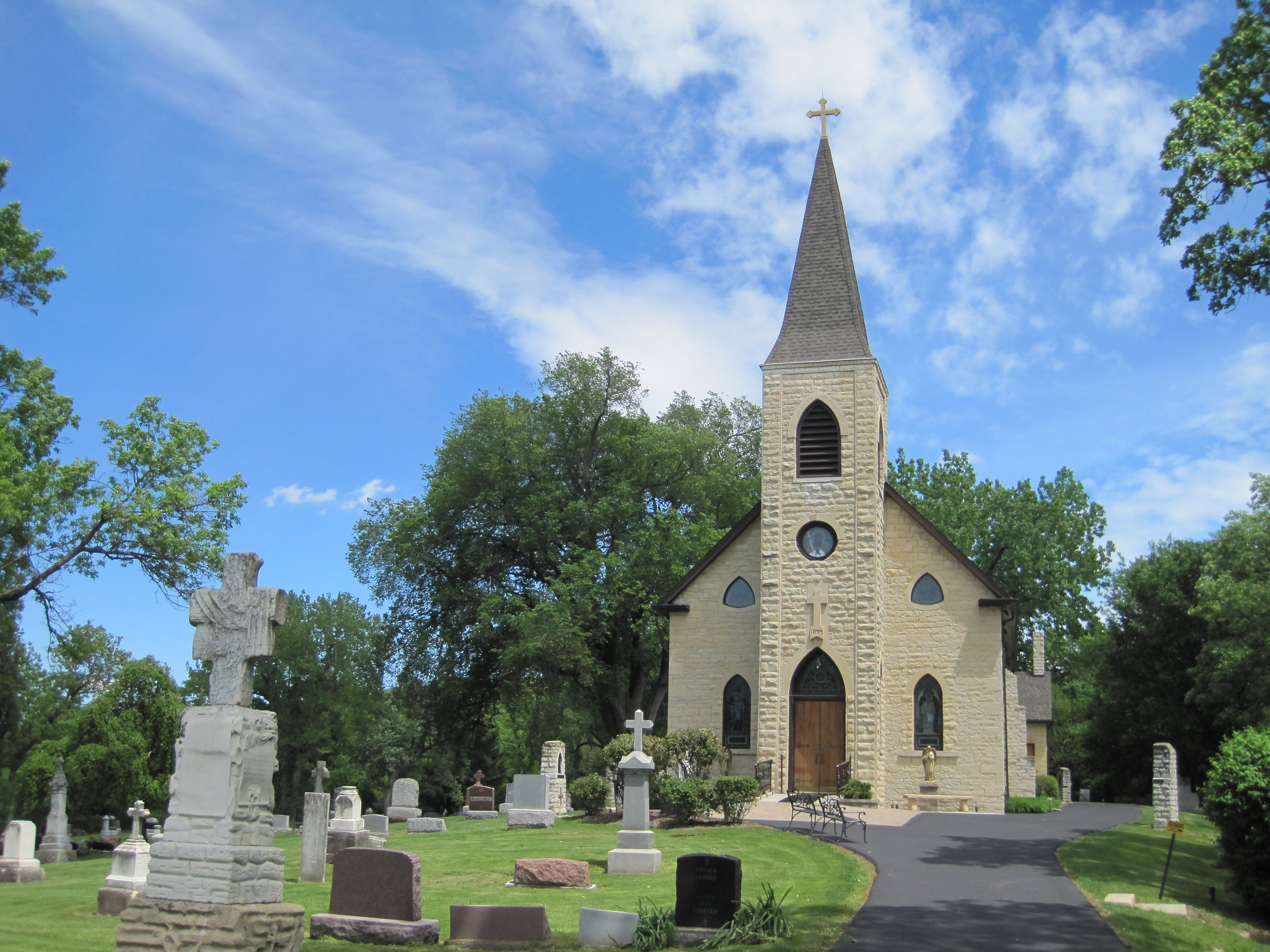

- Location within Illinois Location within the United States
- Location: 10600 South Archer Avenue, Lemont, Cook County, Illinois, USA
- Nearest city: Lemont, Illinois
- Coordinates: 41°41′55″N 87°55′57″W
- Area: 8 acres (3.2 ha)
- Built: 1853
- Architect: Carr, Martin
- NRHP reference No.: 84001047
- Added to NRHP: August 16, 1984

St. James Catholic Church and Cemetery, also known as St. James at Sag Bridge Church is a historic church and cemetery in the Sag Bridge area of Lemont Township, Illinois. It is situated on a high bluff at the western tip of the glacier-carved Mount Forest Island, overlooking the Calumet Sag Channel and the community of Sag Bridge.

== History ==
The site has been important for centuries as a lookout, including a French fort visited by Father Jacques Marquette on his journeys on the Des Plaines River several times in 1673; it is believed he conducted Catholic Mass at the fort.

The church was founded in 1833 by workers building the Illinois and Michigan Canal, and first met in a rough log cabin. The present church building was built from 1853 to 1858 of locally quarried limestone painstakingly dragged up the steep hill. It was built on an ancient Native American trail, which has evolved into today's Archer Avenue (Illinois Route 171).

On March 27, 1991, a tornado caused significant damage to Lemont and Sag Bridge, including the historic St. James church and cemetery. The tornado lifted up the roof of the church and dropped it back down askew, and knocked over numerous trees and tombstones in the cemetery. A group of dedicated parishioners banded together as the St. James Preservation Society to repair the damage and restore their church.

St. James at Sag Bridge Catholic Church continues today in its historic role as the center of the Sag Bridge community. It is the only county parish in the Roman Catholic Archdiocese of Chicago. It was added to the National Register of Historic Places on August 16, 1984, and is a contributing property of the Illinois and Michigan Canal National Heritage Corridor.
