= John C. Kluczynski =

American politician (1896–1975)

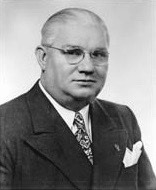

Member of the U.S. House of Representatives from Illinois's 5th district
- In office January 3, 1951 – January 26, 1975
- Preceded by: Martin Gorski
- Succeeded by: John G. Fary

Member of the Illinois Senate
- In office 1948–1949

Member of the Illinois House of Representatives
- In office 1933–1948

Personal details
- Born: John Carl Kluczynski; February 15, 1896 Chicago, Illinois, U.S.
- Died: January 26, 1975 (aged 78) Chicago, Illinois, U.S.
- Resting place: Resurrection Mausoleum, Justice, Illinois
- Party: Democratic

John Carl Kluczynski (February 15, 1896 – January 26, 1975) was an American World War I veteran who served 13 terms as a U.S. representative from Illinois, representing the 5th district from 1951 until his death from a heart attack in Chicago, Illinois in 1975.

== Early life and career ==
Born in Chicago, Illinois to Thomas Kluczynski and Mary Kluczynski, née Sulaski, Kluczynski attended public and parochial schools, and during the First World War served overseas as a corporal with the Eighth Field Artillery in 1918 and 1919.

He worked in the catering business upon returning to Chicago, and served in the Illinois House of Representatives from 1933 through 1948. In 1948, Kluczynski was elected to the Illinois Senate, in which he served until resigning in December 1949 to run as candidate for Congress.

== Tenure in Congress ==
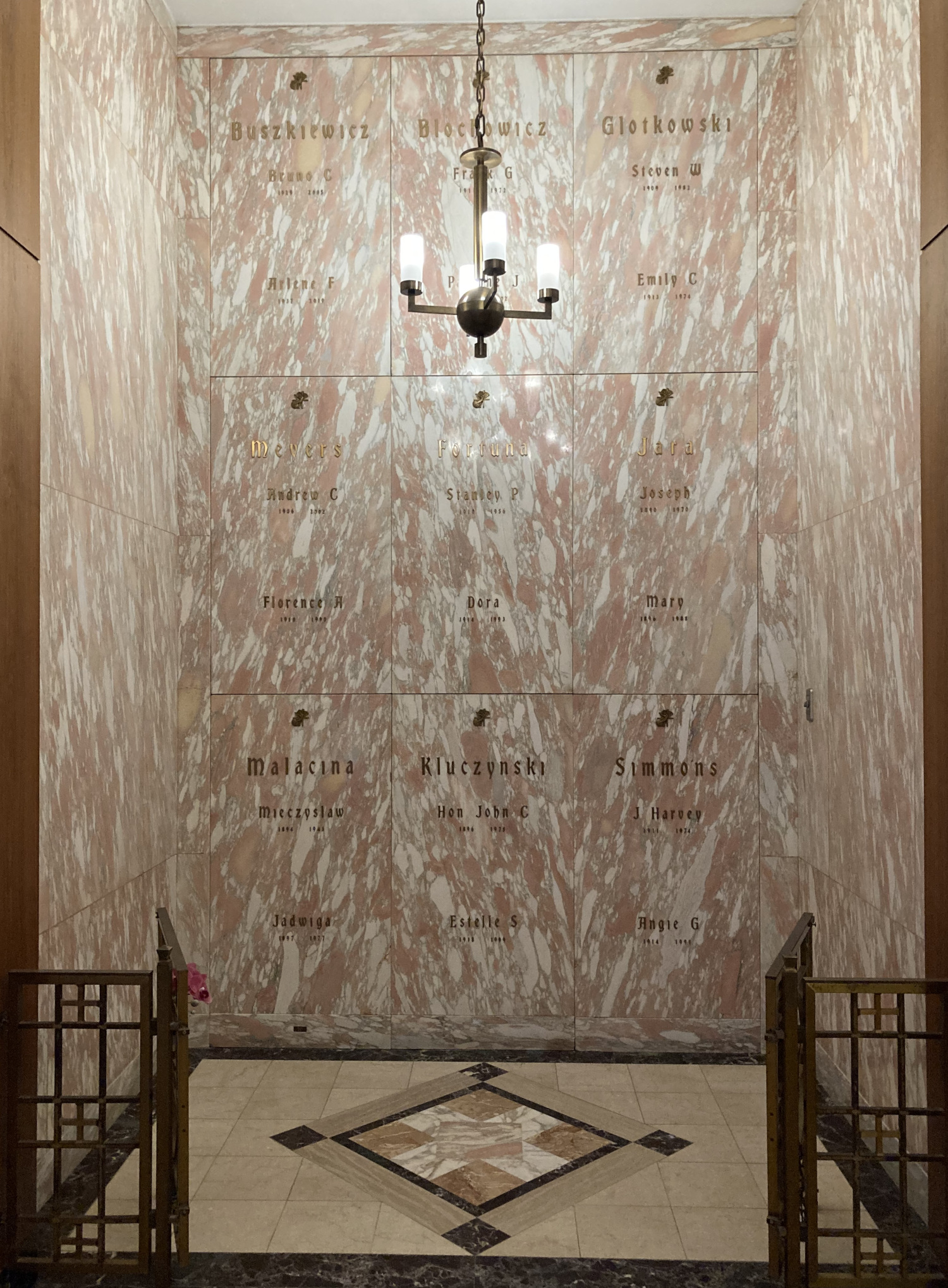
Kluczynski's grave (bottom center) at Resurrection Mausoleum

Kluczynski was elected as a Democrat to the Eighty-second Congress. He was reelected to the twelve succeeding Congresses, and served from January 3, 1951, until his death from a heart attack January 26, 1975, in Chicago.

He voted in favor of the Civil Rights Act of 1957.

While in Congress, he served as chairman of the Public Works subcommittee on transportation.

He was interred in Resurrection Mausoleum, Justice, Illinois.

== Legacy ==
The office building at the Chicago Federal Center, known as the Kluczynski Federal Building, was named in Kluczynski's honor after his death in 1975.

He was a Polish-American, active in the life of his community as a member of the Polish National Alliance and Polish Roman Catholic Union of America.

== See also ==
- List of members of the United States Congress who died in office (1950–1999)

== Sources ==
- United States Congress. "John C. Kluczynski (id: K000273)". Biographical Directory of the United States Congress.

U.S. House of Representatives
Preceded by Martin Gorski	Member of the U.S. House of Representatives from Illinois's 5th congressional district January 3, 1951 – January 26, 1975	Succeeded by John G. Fary
