= John G. Fary =

American politician

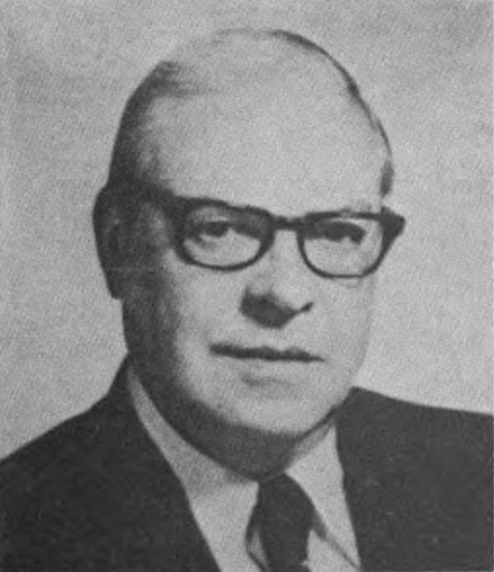

Member of the U.S. House of Representatives from Illinois's 5th district
- In office July 8, 1975 – January 3, 1983
- Preceded by: John C. Kluczynski
- Succeeded by: Bill Lipinski

Personal details
- Born: April 11, 1911 Chicago, Illinois, U.S.
- Died: June 7, 1984 (aged 73) Chicago, Illinois, U.S.
- Party: Democratic

John G. Fary (April 11, 1911 – June 7, 1984) was a U.S. representative from Illinois. He represented Illinois's 5th congressional district

== Biography ==
Fary was born in Chicago, Illinois, on April 11, 1911. He attended Saint Peter and Paul grammar school and graduated from Holy Trinity High School. His father was a tavern owner. He grew up in the "Back of the Yards"/McKinley Park neighborhood of Chicago's Southside. He attended Loyola University Chicago, Real Estate School of Illinois and Mid-West Institute. He served in the Illinois House of Representatives from 1955 to 1975.

The accomplishment he was most well known for was to relegalize the playing of bingo for charitable purposes in the state of Illinois in 1971. This game had been outlawed as a form of illegal gambling. Church and veterans' organizations had used the game as a source of revenue.

He was a member of the Knights of Columbus, LaSalle General Assembly, Moose, Eagles, Kiwanis, Lions, Polish National Alliance, Polish Roman Catholic Union and Chamber of Commerce. His hobbies were fishing, hunting and golfing.

Fary was elected as a Democrat to the Ninety-fourth Congress by special election, to fill the vacancy caused by the death of U.S. Representative John Kluczynski and reelected to the three succeeding Congresses (July 8, 1975 – January 3, 1983). He served on the Aviation Subcommittee and was instrumental in rebuilding Midway Airport. He was defeated in the 1982 Democratic primary by Chicago Alderman Bill Lipinski. He was named 1978 National Citizen of the year by a Polish newspaper in Buffalo, NY. In 1982, a railway bridge on 67th and Cicero in the Southside of Chicago was named in his honor.

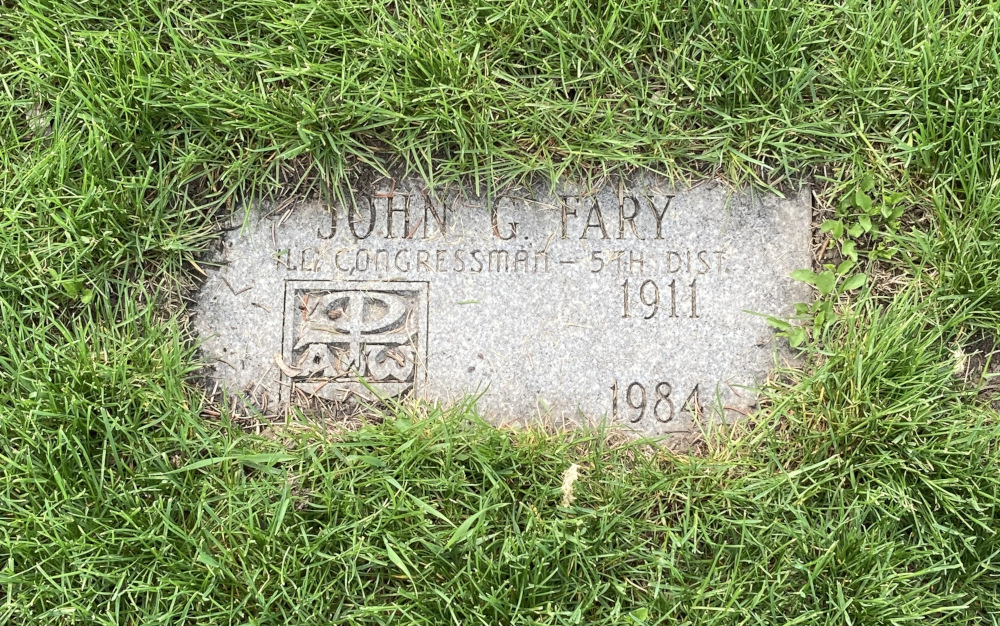
Fary's grave at Resurrection Cemetery

He died in Chicago on June 7, 1984, at Rush Presbyterian St Luke's Hospital. He was interred at Resurrection Cemetery, Justice, Illinois. The funeral procession of nearly 100 cars was escorted to the church by Chicago police. Seven Roman Catholic priests, led by Bishop Alfred Abramowicz, auxiliary bishop of Chicago and pastor of Five Holy Martyrs Church celebrated the requiem mass accompanied by the bishop's choir and violinists from the Civic Orchestra of Chicago. 250 mourners were in attendance.

U.S. House of Representatives
Preceded by John C. Kluczynski	Member of the U.S. House of Representatives from Illinois's 5th congressional district July 8, 1975 – January 3, 1983	Succeeded by Bill Lipinski
