= Resurrection Mary =

"Vanishing hitchhiker" type ghost story of the Chicago area

Coordinates: 41°45′35″N 87°49′39″W

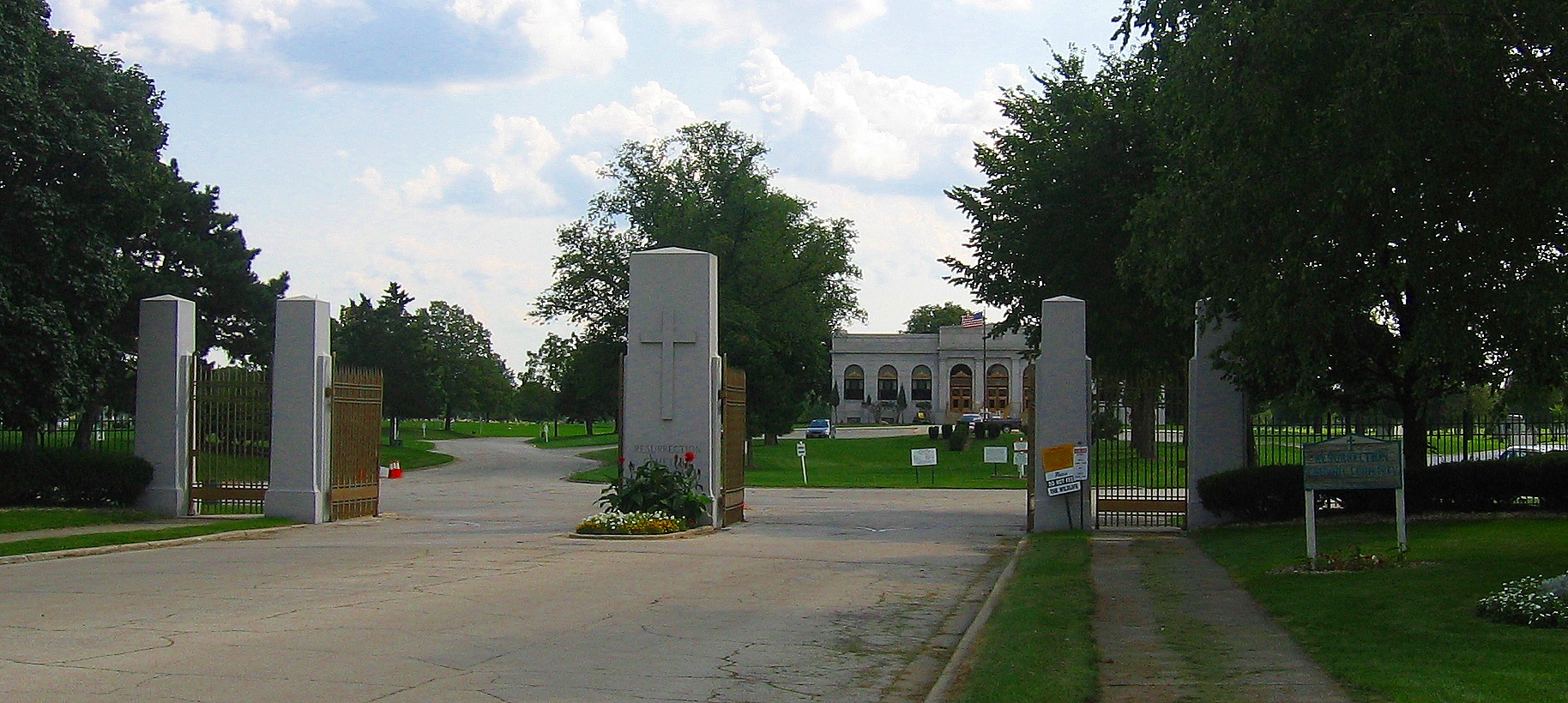
The main gate of Resurrection Cemetery on Archer Avenue in Justice, Illinois

Resurrection Mary is a well-known Chicago-area ghost story, of the "vanishing hitchhiker" type, a type of folklore that is known in many cultures. According to the story, the ghost resides in Resurrection Cemetery in Justice, Illinois, a few miles southwest of Chicago. Resurrection Mary is considered to be Chicago's most famous ghost.

Since the 1930s, several men driving northeast along Archer Avenue between the Willowbrook Ballroom and Resurrection Cemetery have reported picking up a young female hitchhiker. This young woman is dressed somewhat formally in a white party dress, and is said to have light blonde hair and blue eyes. Other reports indicate that she wears a thin shawl and dancing shoes, carries a small clutch purse, and possibly is very quiet. As the driver nears Resurrection Cemetery, she disappears into it. According to the Chicago Tribune, "full-time ghost hunter" Richard Crowe has collected "three dozen … substantiated" reports of Mary from the 1930s to the present.

== Legend ==
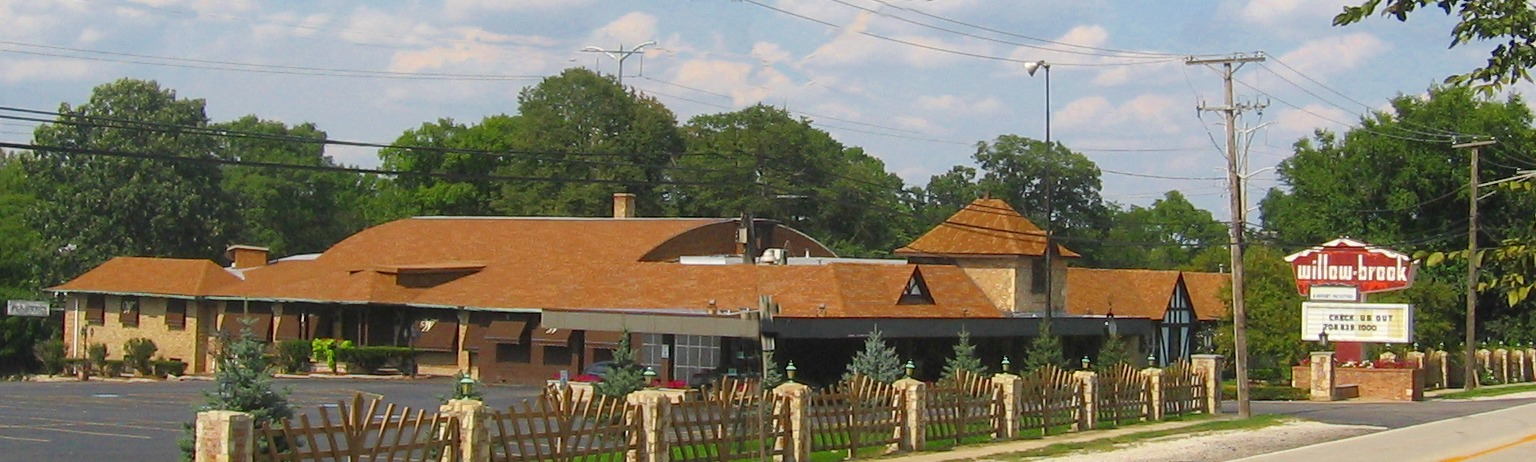
The Willowbrook Ballroom, formerly the Oh Henry Ballroom, in Willow Springs, Illinois

The story goes that Mary had spent the evening dancing with a boyfriend at the Oh Henry Ballroom. At some point, they got into an argument and Mary stormed out. She left the ballroom and started walking up Archer Avenue. She had not gone far when she was struck and killed by a hit-and-run driver, who fled the scene, leaving Mary to die. Her parents found her and were grief-stricken at the sight of her dead body. They buried her in Resurrection Cemetery, wearing a beautiful white dancing dress and matching dancing shoes. The hit-and-run driver was never found.

== Reported sightings ==
Jerry Palus, a Chicago southsider, reported that in 1939, he met a person whom he came to believe was Resurrection Mary at the Liberty Grove and Hall at 47th and Mozart (and not the Oh Henry/Willowbrook Ballroom). They danced and even kissed, and she asked him to drive her home along Archer Avenue, exiting the car and disappearing in front of Resurrection Cemetery.

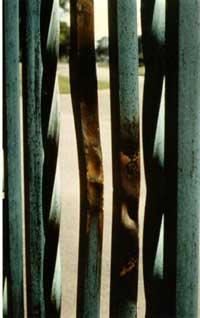
Burned section of the front gate bars

In 1973, Resurrection Mary was said to have shown up at Harlow's Nightclub, on Cicero Avenue on Chicago's southwest side. That same year, a cab driver came into Chet's Melody Lounge, across the street from Resurrection Cemetery, to inquire about a young lady who had left without paying her fare.

Sightings in 1976, 1978, 1980, and 1989, reportedly involved cars striking, or nearly striking, Mary outside Resurrection Cemetery. Mary disappears, however, by the time the motorist exits the car. She also reportedly burned her handprints into the wrought-iron fence around the cemetery in August 1976, although officials at the cemetery have stated that a truck had damaged the fence with no evidence of a ghost.

In a January 31, 1979, article in the Suburban Trib, columnist Bill Geist detailed the story of a cab driver, Ralph, who picked up a young woman – "a looker. A blonde. ... she was young enough to be my daughter — 21 tops" – near a small shopping center on Archer Avenue.

"A couple miles up Archer there, she jumped with a start like a horse and said, 'Here! Here!' I hit the brakes. I looked around and didn't see no kind of house. 'Where?' I said. And then she sticks out her arm and points across the road to my left and says 'There!'. And that's when it happened. I looked to my left — like this — at this little shack. And when I turned she was gone. Vanished! And the car door never opened. May the good Lord strike me dead, it never opened."

Geist described Ralph as "not an idiot or a maniac", but rather, in Ralph's own words, "a typical 52-year-old working guy, a veteran, father, Little League baseball coach, churchgoer, the whole shot". Geist goes on to say: "The simple explanation, Ralph, is that you picked up the Chicago area's pre-eminent ghost: Resurrection Mary."

== Identity of Mary ==
Some researchers have attempted to link Resurrection Mary to one of the many thousands of burials in Resurrection Cemetery. A particular focus of these efforts has been Mary Bregovy, who died in 1934, although her death came in an automobile accident in the downtown Chicago Loop. In 1999, Chicago author Ursula Bielski documented a possible connection to Anna "Marija" Norkus, who died in a 1927 auto accident while on her way home from the Oh Henry Ballroom, a theory that has gained popularity in recent years.Although burial records state that Anna "Marija" Norkus is interred in St. Casmiers Cemetery, not Resurrection Cemetery, which is why the ghost is called "Resurrection Mary" instead of "St. Casmiers Mary". Furthermore, Anna "Marija" Norkus was only twelve years old at the time of her death, several years younger than the Resurrection Mary that witnesses have described.
