= Archer Avenue =

Thoroughfare in Chicago, Illinois, United States

Archer Avenue (Archer Road)
- Ronald J. Bragassi Memorial Road; State Street (Lockport and Fairmont only)
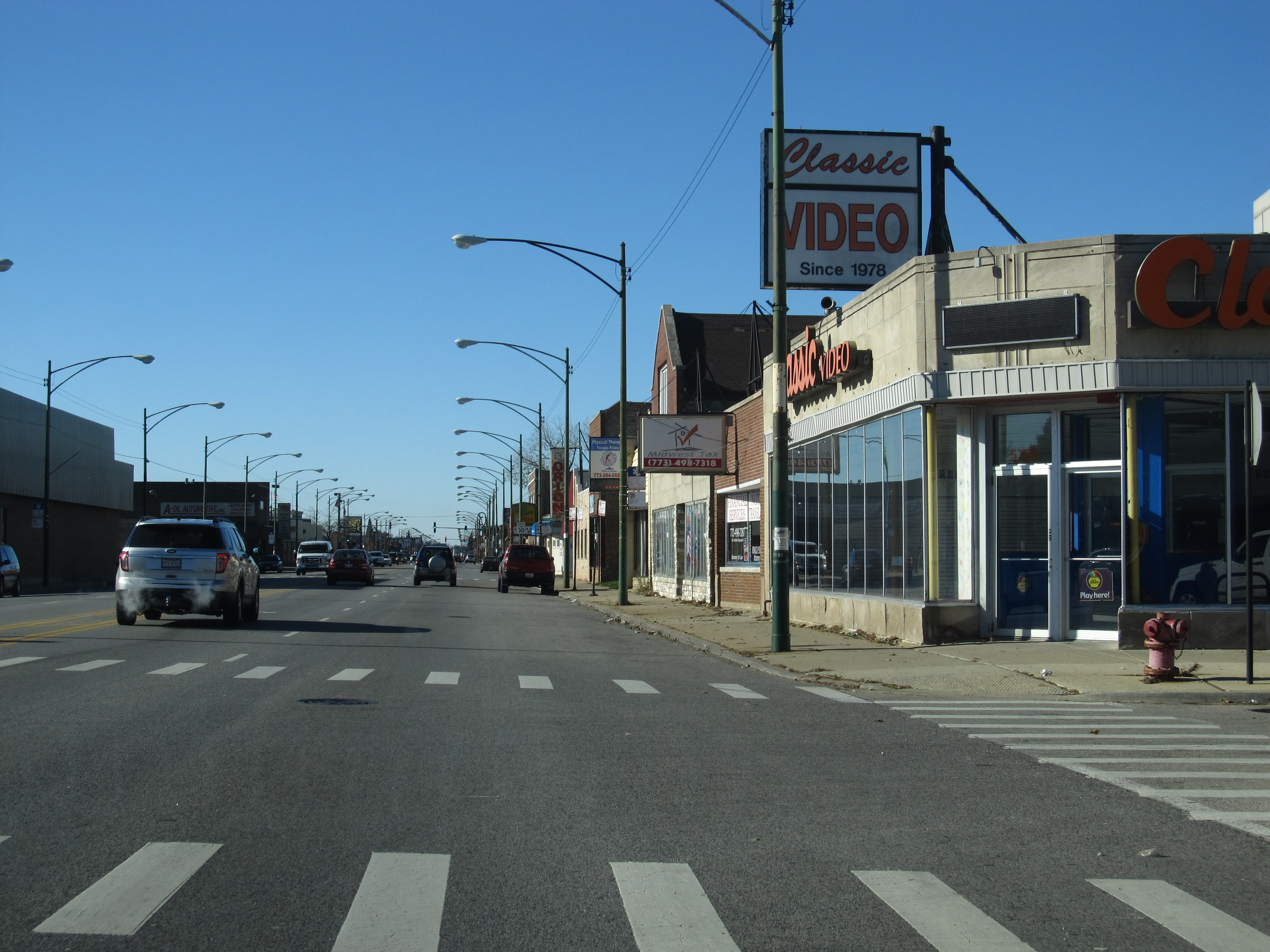
- Archer Avenue in Garfield Ridge, north of Midway Airport
- Part of: IL 171 from Joliet to Summit; IL 83 in Sag Bridge
- Length: 33.6 mi (54.1 km)
- Location: Joliet–Chicago, Illinois, United States
- Southwest end: Dartmouth Avenue (turns into Collins Street locally) in Joliet
- Major junctions: IL 7 in Lockport; I-355 Toll in Lockport; I-294 Toll / US 12 / US 20 / US 45 at the Willow Spring–Justice; IL 43 at the Garfield Ridge, Chicago–Summit line; IL 50 in Garfield Ridge, Chicago
- Northeast end: State Street (approx. 1900 South) in Near South Side, Chicago

Archer Avenue, sometimes known as Archer Road outside the Chicago, Illinois city limits, and also known as State Street only in Lockport, Illinois and Fairmont, Illinois city limits, is a street running northeast-to-southwest between Chicago's Chinatown and Lockport. Archer follows the original trail crossing the Chicago Portage between the Chicago River and the Des Plaines River, and parallels the path of the Illinois and Michigan Canal and the Joliet Subdivision of the Alton Railroad. As a main traffic artery, it has largely been replaced by the modern Stevenson Expressway.

The street was named after the first commissioner of the Illinois and Michigan Canal, William Beatty Archer. One early map of Chicago (ca. 1830) listed what may have been the future Archer Road as "The Road to Widow Brown's" (Note: "There is a dispute about the route taken from Chicago to Widow Brown's house in the woods on the north branch of Hickory Creek (east of Mokena). One historian asserts that it went southwest (on Archer Ave. to Justice Park), thence ... . Others assert that it went southward on State St. and Vincennes Ave. on the road to Blue Island, and thence southwesterly on what is now the Southwest Highway.").

== Route description ==
The east end of Archer begins in Chicago's Chinatown, then passes through the Bridgeport, McKinley Park and Brighton Park neighborhoods on its way to Archer Heights and Garfield Ridge. Outside Chicago, Archer Avenue/Road passes through the villages of Summit, Justice, Willow Springs, and the southern edge of Lemont before terminating on the north side of Lockport. Between Summit and Lockport, Archer Avenue is designated as a part of Illinois Route 171.

== History ==
Historically, this section of Archer was a part of Illinois Route 4, the original 1924 highway connecting St. Louis and Chicago. In 1926, Route 4 was rerouted to the north side of the Des Plaines River on an alignment that subsequently became U.S. Route 66, and its former route on Archer was redesignated as Illinois Route 4A. By 1939, Route 4A had been extended along most of Archer Avenue into Downtown Chicago. In 1967, Route 4A was truncated back to Summit and merged into Illinois Route 171.

== Points of interest ==
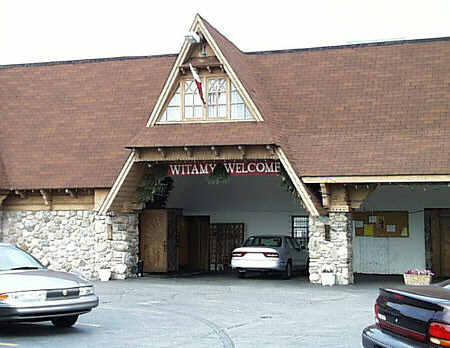
The seat of the Polish Highlanders Alliance of North America along Archer Avenue just northwest of its intersection with Pulaski.

Southwest of Lemont, Archer passes Cog Hill Golf & Country Club, the site of numerous Professional Golfers Association tournaments.

=== Historical sites ===
The former site of Argonne National Laboratory and its predecessor, the University of Chicago Metallurgical Laboratory in the forest preserve near Red Gate Woods, can be entered from an access road on Archer Avenue. This was once a secret Manhattan Project site, and is now known as the Site A/Plot M Disposal Site. Chicago Pile-1 (CP-1), the world's first nuclear reactor, was moved from Stagg Field to this site in 1943 and renamed Chicago Pile-2 (CP-2). The remains of CP-1, CP-2, and Chicago Pile-3 (CP-3) remain buried at this site.

A defunct Playland Amusement Park opened in mid-summer of 1950 which, at the time, was located in Willow Springs, Illinois. Back then, Willow Springs used to be an unincorporated community. The amusement park was located at 9300 West 79th Street in present-day Justice, Illinois.

== Transportation ==
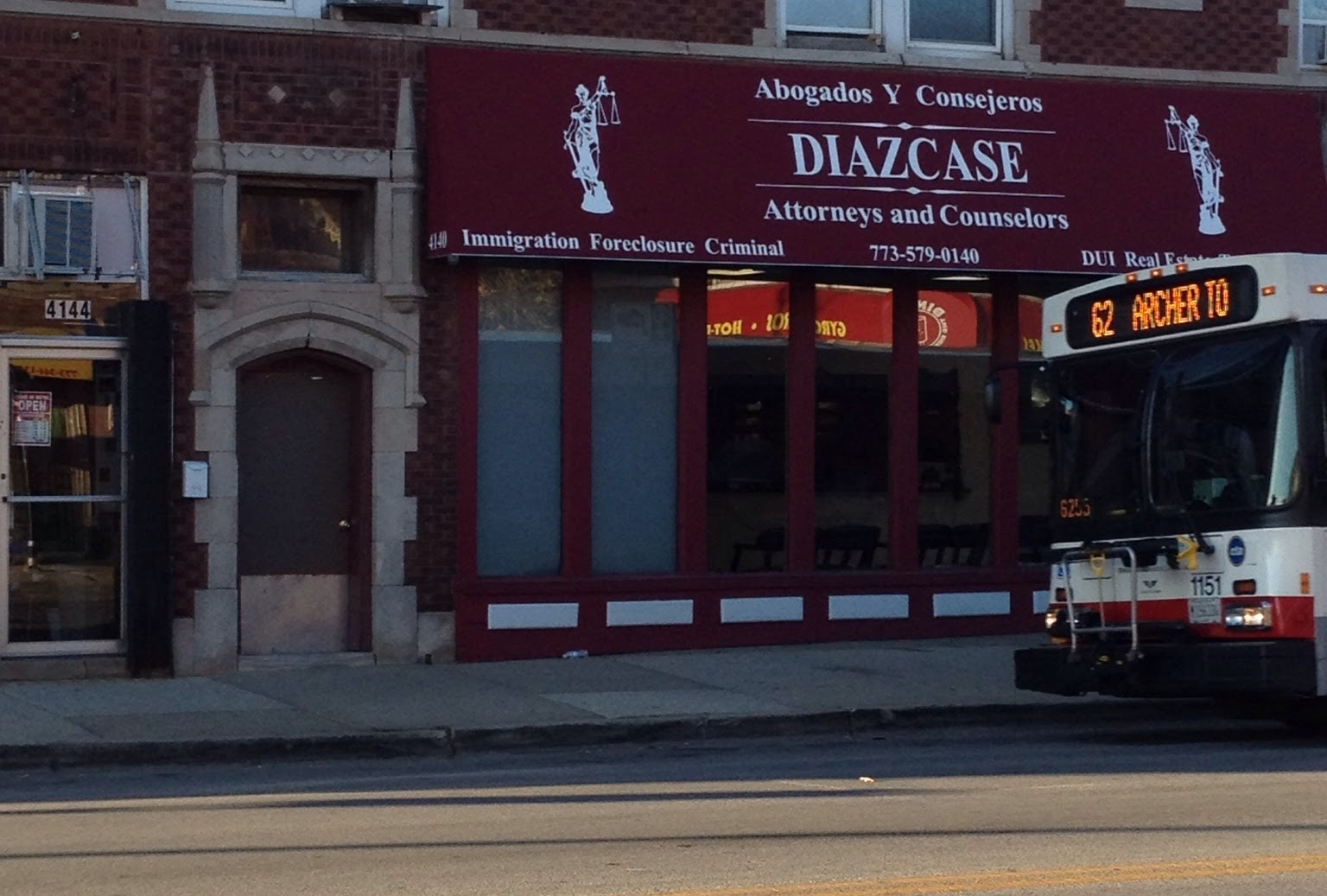
CTA route 62 bus in Brighton Park, Chicago

Archer Avenue is served by several transit corridors.

Much of the Orange Line parallels Archer Avenue with Pulaski, 35th/Archer, Ashland, and Halsted stations being located at the said road. Metra's Heritage Corridor also parallels Archer Avenue. Cermak–Chinatown station on the Red Line provides a direct connection to and from Archer Avenue.

62 Archer is a CTA bus route that complements the Orange Line for much of its route. The route travels from Neva Avenue, located east of Harlem Avenue in Garfield Ridge, to Kinzie Street in River North via Archer Avenue, State Street, and Dearborn Street. 62H Archer/Harlem runs from Midway station to 63rd Street/Archer Avenue via Cicero Avenue, Archer Avenue, Harlem Avenue, and 63rd Street.

In the southwest suburbs, Archer Avenue historically hosted an interurban line, the Chicago and Joliet Electric Railway.

== In popular culture ==
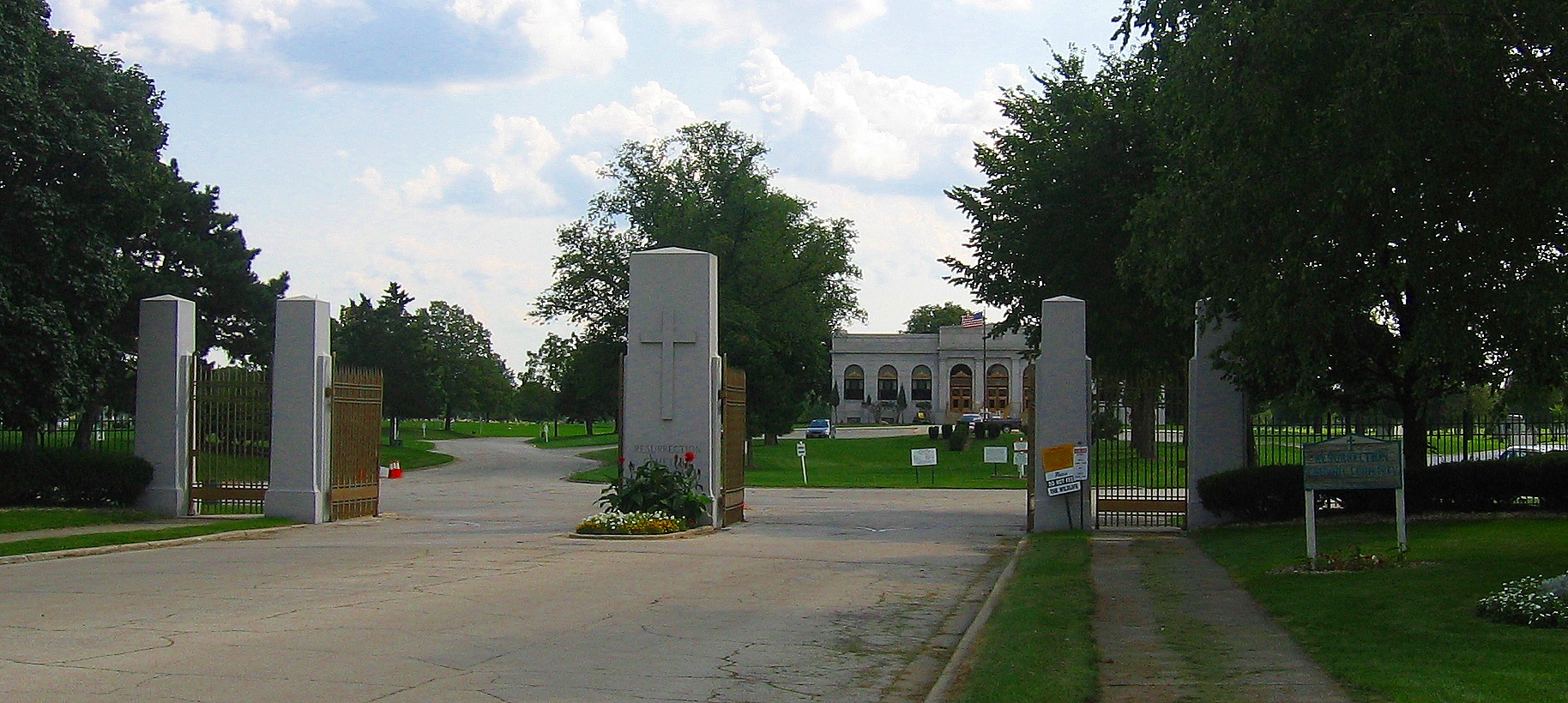
The main gate of Resurrection Cemetery on Archer Avenue, reputedly the home of Resurrection Mary

Archer Avenue was made famous by Finley Peter Dunne in his books and sketches about the fictional saloonkeeper Mr. Dooley, whose tavern was on "Archey Road". The fictional Dooley "lived" in the real-life Bridgeport, Chicago neighborhood.

Archer Avenue is also famous as the purported haunting place of Resurrection Mary, a vanishing hitchhiker who is said to travel between the Willowbrook Ballroom and Resurrection Cemetery.

== Major intersections ==
County	Location	mi	km	Destinations	Notes
Will	Joliet			IL 171 south (Collins Street)	Continuation beyond Dartmouth Avenue
Will	Joliet–Fairmont line	0.0	0.0	Dartmouth Avenue	Southwestern terminus
Will	Lockport	2.7	4.3	IL 7 (9th Street)	
Will	Lockport	6.7	10.8	I-355 Toll (Veterans Memorial Tollway)	
Will	Lemont	9.2	14.8	CR 35 west (135th Street - Romeo Road)	
Cook	Lemont	10.3	16.6	CR B51 east (131st Street)	
Cook	Lemont	11.2	18.0	CR B50 west (127th Street)	
Cook	Lemont Township	12.1	19.5	CR W18 south (Bell Road)	
Cook	Sag Bridge	12.3	19.8	IL 83 south (111th Street)	Southern end of IL 83 overlap
Cook	Sag Bridge	13.1	21.1	IL 83 north (Kingery Highway)	Northern end of IL 83 overlap
Cook	Willow Springs	17.7	28.5	CR W79 south (Nolton Avenue)	
Cook	Willow Springs–Justice line	18.7	30.1	US 12 / US 20 / US 45 (La Grange Road) / I-294 Toll south (Tri-State Tollway)	I-294 southbound entrance only; to mainline toll barrier
Cook	Justice	19.2	30.9	79th Street	Northbound IL 171 exit; southbound IL 171 entrance
Cook	Bedford Park–Bridgeview line	21.1	34.0	CR W32 south (Roberts Road)	
Cook	Summit	22.8	36.7	IL 171 north (1st Avenue)	Northern end of IL 171 overlap
Cook	Summit–Chicago line	23.2	37.3	IL 43 (South Harlem Avenue)	
Cook	Chicago	26.3	42.3	IL 50 (South Cicero Avenue)	
Cook	Chicago	29.3	47.2	CR W94 (California Avenue)	
Cook	Chicago	31.2	50.2	CR W48 south (Ashland Avenue)	
Cook	Chicago	33.6	54.1	South State Street	Northeastern terminus
1.000 mi = 1.609 km; 1.000 km = 0.621 mi: Concurrency terminus; Incomplete access
