= James V. Buckley =

American politician (1894–1954)

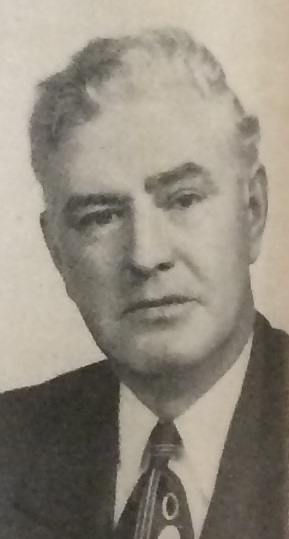
- From 1949's Pictorial Directory of the 81st Congress

Member of the U.S. House of Representatives from Illinois's 4th district
- In office January 3, 1949 – January 3, 1951
- Preceded by: Martin Gorski
- Succeeded by: William E. McVey

Personal details
- Born: May 15, 1894 Saginaw County, Michigan, US
- Died: July 30, 1954 (aged 60) Hammond, Indiana, US
- Party: Democratic

James Vincent Buckley (May 15, 1894 – July 30, 1954) was a U.S. representative from Illinois.

Born on a farm in Saginaw County, Michigan, Buckley attended the public schools of Saginaw County, Michigan. He moved to Chicago, Illinois, at an early age and worked in the automobile industry. He engaged in the real estate and building business in the Calumet region of Cook County, Illinois, and Lake County, Indiana. During the Second World War was active in war-plant production service and was elected president of Local Union 714, United Automobile Workers.

Buckley was elected as a Democrat to the Eighty-first Congress (January 3, 1949 – January 3, 1951). He was an unsuccessful candidate for reelection in 1950 to the Eighty-second Congress. He engaged in the real estate and building business at Calumet City, Illinois, from 1951 until his death. He died in Hammond, Indiana, July 30, 1954. He was interred in Calvary Cemetery, Gary, Indiana.

U.S. House of Representatives
| Preceded by Martin Gorski | Member of the U.S. House of Representatives from Illinois's 4th congressional district 1949-1951 | Succeeded by William E. McVey |
