= Bill Lipinski =

American politician (born 1937)

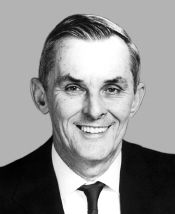

Member of the U.S. House of Representatives from Illinois
- In office January 3, 1983 – January 3, 2005
- Preceded by: John G. Fary
- Succeeded by: Dan Lipinski
- Constituency: 5th district (1983–1993); 3rd district (1993–2005)

Member of the Chicago City Council
- In office 1975–1983
- Preceded by: Joseph Potempa
- Succeeded by: William Krystyniak
- Constituency: 23rd ward

Personal details
- Born: William Oliver Lipinski; December 22, 1937 (age 88) Chicago, Illinois, U.S.
- Party: Democratic
- Spouse: Rose Lipinski
- Children: 2, including Dan
- Education: Loras College
- Lipinski's voice Lipinski on ending the sugar subsidy program. Recorded June 6, 2001

William Oliver Lipinski (born December 22, 1937) is an American politician and lobbyist who was a Democratic member of the United States House of Representatives from 1983 to 2005, representing a district in Chicago.

== Life and career ==
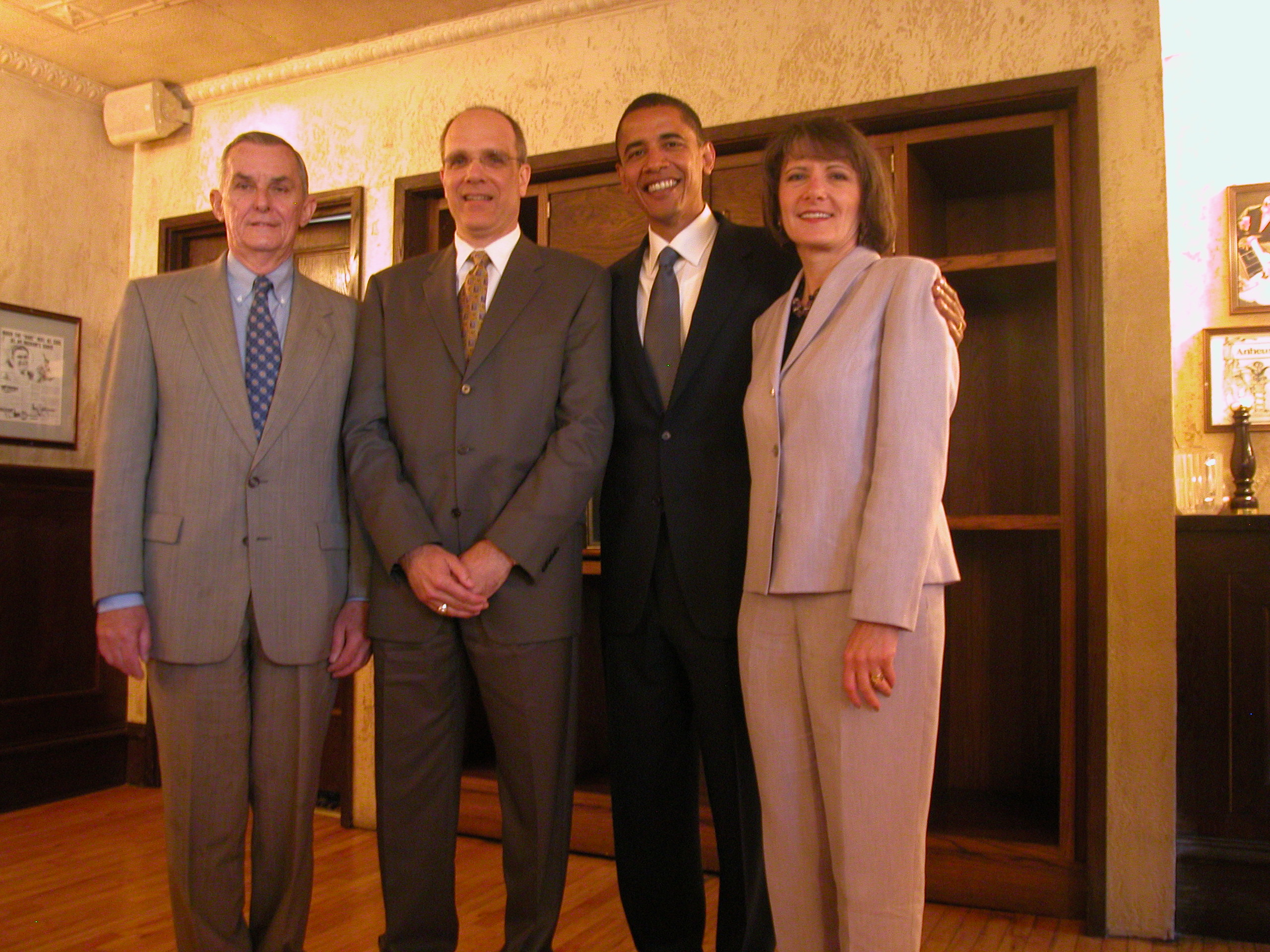
Lipinski (far left) in 2004 with RTA Executive Director Steve Schlickman and Illinois State Senator Barack Obama and State Representative Julie Hamos

=== Pre-congressional career ===
He was born in Chicago, and was educated at Loras College in Dubuque, Iowa. Lipinski served in the United States Army Reserve from 1961 to 1967. He was given a patronage job as public administrator with the Chicago Park District of the city of Chicago.

In 1975, Mayor Richard J. Daley named him as the Democratic committeeman for Chicago's 23rd Ward, in the southwestern portion of the city. In the same year, Lipinski was elected to the Chicago City Council as the alderman for the 23rd Ward. Lipinski remained an alderman until he became a congressman in 1983.

=== Congressional career ===
In 1982, he challenged incumbent Democrat John G. Fary in the primary for Illinois's 5th congressional district, which included most of southwestern Chicago. He won largely by running up the totals in his city council district, and was handily elected in November.

Lipinski became the mentor of future City Clerk of Chicago, James Laski, who by 1988 had become chief-of-staff of the joint Democrat Service Office for the city's southwest side, and acted as a personal aide to Lipinski.

Lipinski played an important role in getting federal funding for the CTA Orange Line.

Lipinski was reelected four times from the 5th Congressional District with almost no difficulty. After the 1990 census, however, his district was merged with the 3rd district, represented by a longtime friend, Marty Russo. Lipinski defeated Russo in the 1992 Democratic primary, mainly by running up his margins in the Chicago portion of the district—which is virtually coextensive with the 23rd Ward. This all but assured him of a sixth term. He was reelected five more times from this district, facing serious opposition only once, in 1994.

While in the House, Lipinski served on the Transportation Committee; his district included Midway Airport and also had more railroad crossings than any other district.

Lipinski was conservative by national Democratic standards. He strongly opposed abortion, and described himself as a staunch conservative on foreign policy. He was a member of the Blue Dog Coalition.

Lipinski endorsed Bill Bradley for the Democratic presidential nomination in 2000.

During the 2004 election cycle, Lipinski easily won the primary election, which practically assured him of a 12th term in Congress. On August 13, 2004, however, Lipinski withdrew his name from the November 2 general election ballot, announcing that he would retire at the end of his 11th term, which expired on January 3, 2005. As the 23rd Ward committeeman, he was able to persuade state Democratic party leaders to name his son, Dan Lipinski, a University of Tennessee professor, to replace him on the ballot. The younger Lipinski won all of his reelection bids up until 2020, when he lost his primary election in 2020 to Marie Newman.

=== Lobbying career ===
In 2007, after leaving the House of Representatives, Lipinski opened a one-man lobbying firm. In its first eight years, the firm was paid $4 million by clients with business before the House Transportation Committee: the Chicago Transit Authority, Metra, BNSF Railway, and the Association of American Railroads. Lipinski was an influential member of the Transportation Committee, and his son served on the committee. This was described as concerning by Public Citizen; the younger Lipinski said that his father has not lobbied him and has pledged not to do so.

U.S. House of Representatives
Preceded by John G. Fary	Member of the U.S. House of Representatives from Illinois's 5th congressional district 1983–1993	Succeeded by Dan Rostenkowski
Preceded by Marty Russo	Member of the U.S. House of Representatives from Illinois's 3rd congressional district 1993–2005	Succeeded by Dan Lipinski
U.S. order of precedence (ceremonial)
Preceded by Gene Taylor as Former U.S. Representative	Order of precedence of the United States as Former U.S. Representative	Succeeded by Spencer Bachus as Former U.S. Representative
