= William E. McVey =

American politician

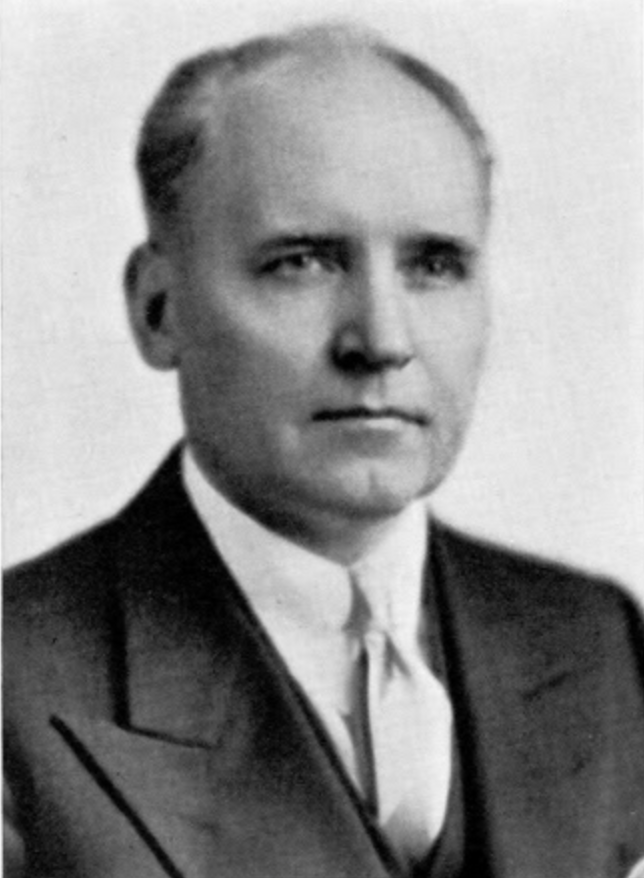

Member of the U.S. House of Representatives from Illinois's 4th district
- In office January 3, 1951 – August 10, 1958
- Preceded by: James V. Buckley
- Succeeded by: Ed Derwinski

Personal details
- Born: December 13, 1885 Clinton County, Ohio, U.S.
- Died: August 10, 1958 (aged 72) Washington, D.C., U.S.
- Party: Republican
- Spouse(s): Elizabeth King McVey, Katharine Johnson McVey

William Estus McVey (born on a farm near Lee’s Creek, Clinton County, Ohio, December 13, 1885 and died in Washington D.C. August 10, 1958) was a Republican member of the U.S. House of Representatives representing Illinois' 4th congressional district from 1951 until his death.

He attended public schools; graduated from Ohio University where he was a member of Phi Kappa Tau fraternity in 1916 and from the University of Chicago in 1919.

He was division superintendent in the Bureau of Education, Philippine Islands, 1908–1914; director of extension, Ohio University, 1916–1919; superintendent of Thornton Township High School and Junior College, Harvey, Illinois, 1919–1947; president of North Central Association of Colleges and Schools in 1943 and 1944; professor of education at De Paul University 1948-1950; author; elected assessor of Thornton Township in 1949; elected as a Republican to the Eighty-second and to the three succeeding Congresses until his death in 1958. McVey voted in favor of the Civil Rights Act of 1957. He had been renominated to the Eighty-sixth Congress but died before the 1958 elections. He is buried in Linwood Cemetery, Galesburg, Illinois.

His first wife, Elizabeth King McVey, died of appendicitis on December 30, 1923 in Harvey, Illinois at age 38. He was later married to Katharine Johnson and was a member of the Episcopal Church, Phi Beta Kappa, Phi Delta Kappa and Phi Kappa Tau.

== See also ==
- List of members of the United States Congress who died in office (1950–1999)

U.S. House of Representatives
Preceded by James V. Buckley	Member of the U.S. House of Representatives from Illinois's 4th congressional district 1951-1958	Succeeded by Ed Derwinski
