= Sag Bridge, Illinois =

Sag Bridge
- Unincorporated community
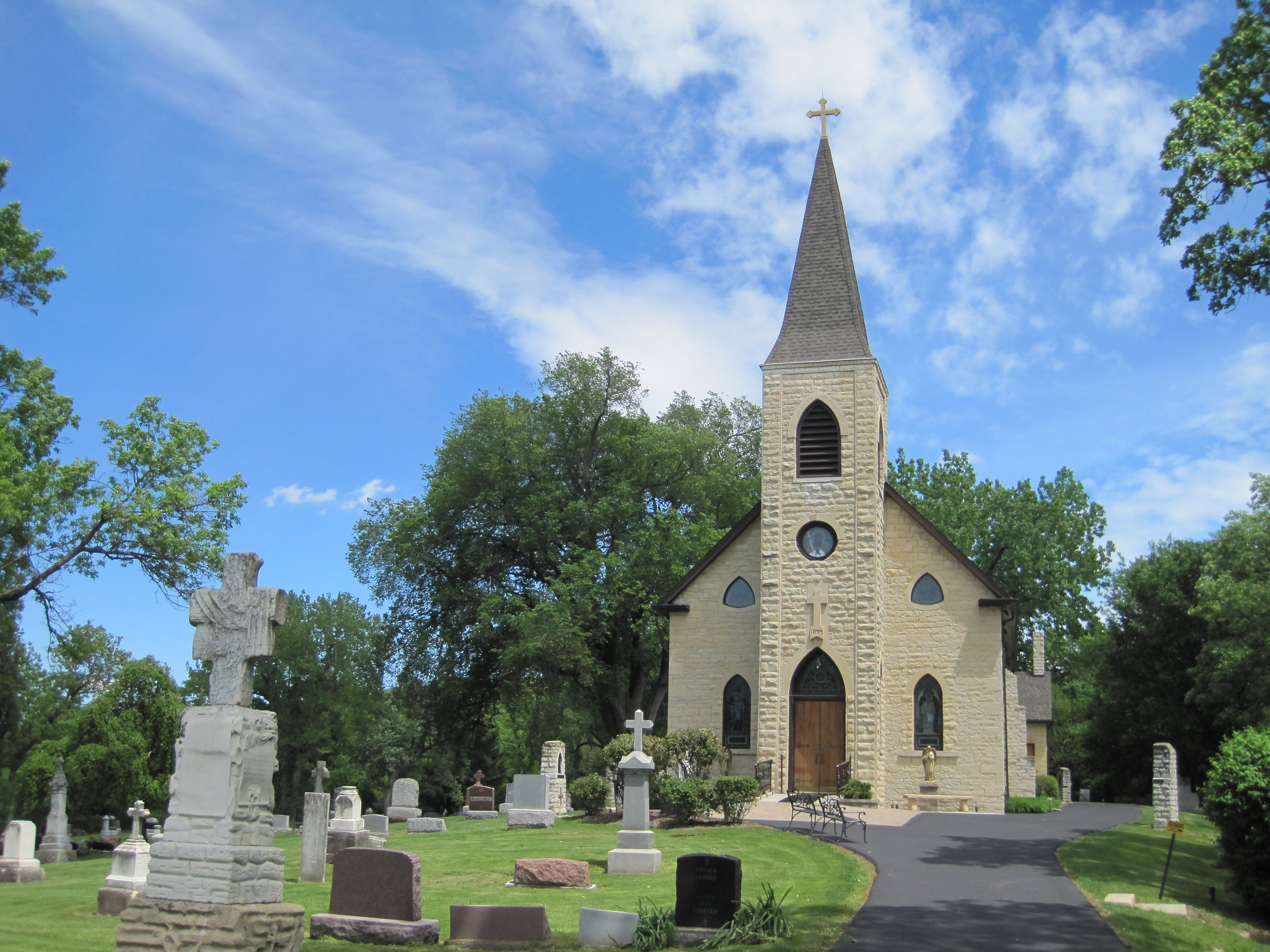
- St. James Catholic Church and Cemetery

- Location of Sag Bridge within Illinois
- Coordinates: 41°41′45″N 87°56′10″W
- Country: United States
- State: Illinois
- County: Cook
- Elevation: 623 ft (190 m)
- Time zone: UTC-6 (CST)
  - Summer (DST): UTC-5 (CDT)
- Postal code: 60439
- Area code: 708

Sag Bridge, Illinois is an Unincorporated community in Lemont Township in southwestern Cook County, Illinois, United States. Sag Bridge is an important waterway junction between the Calumet Sag Channel and the Chicago Sanitary and Ship Canal. It is also the junction of IL 83 (Kingery Highway) and IL 171 (Archer Avenue) which meet at Sag Bridge to cross the Calumet Sag Channel together on the eponymous bridge. The community was named for a predecessor of the present bridge. It is within the village limits and postal delivery zone of Lemont, Illinois.

Other than the bridge for which it was named and the canal that the bridge crosses, the most significant feature of the community is the historic St. James at Sag Bridge Catholic Church, listed on the National Register of Historic Places.

== History ==
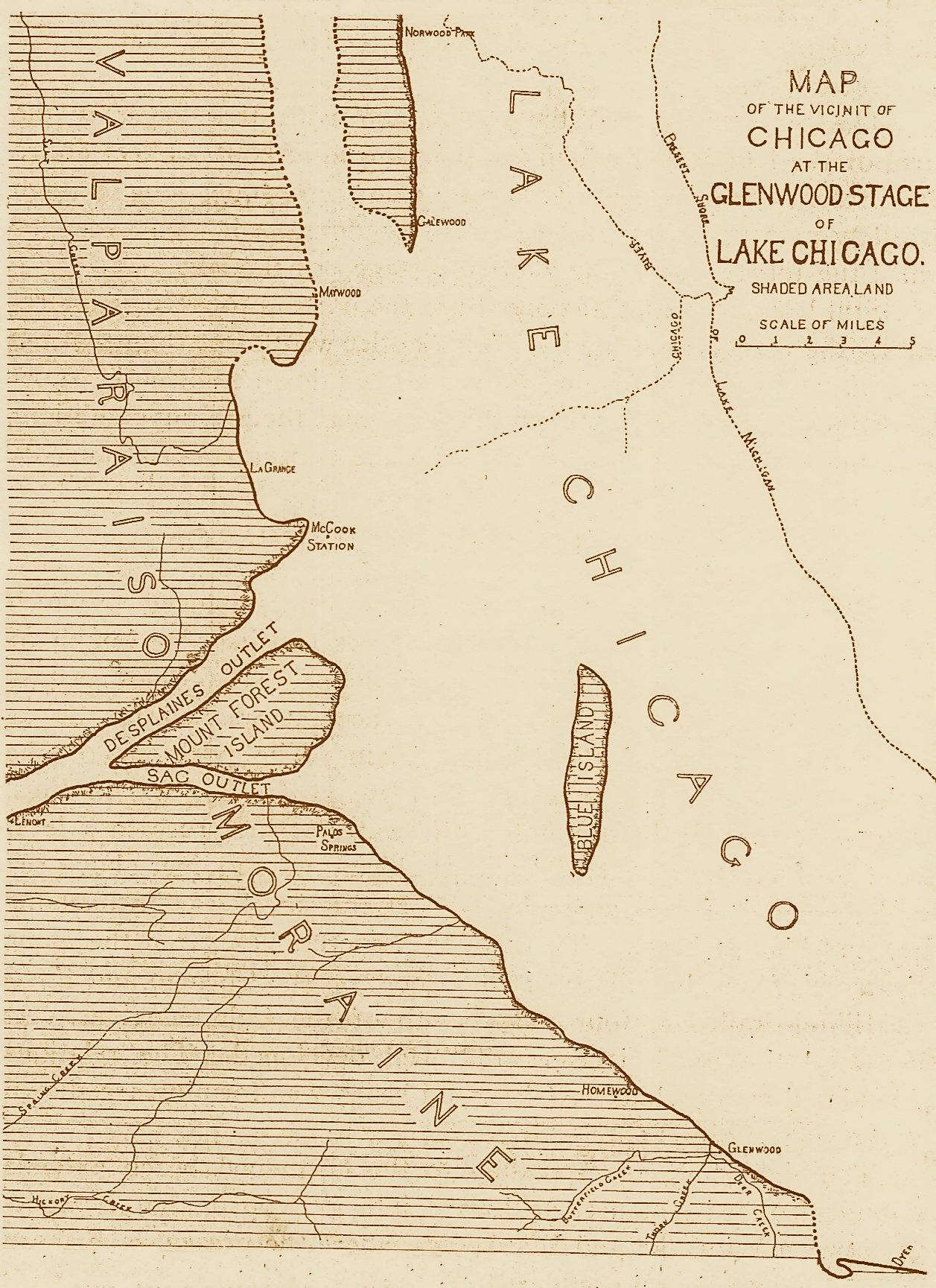

Sag Bridge exists at a significant geophysical point, at the confluence of the Sag Outlet and DesPlaines Outlet from historic Lake Chicago, which joined at this point to form the Chicago Outlet River and eventually flow into the Illinois River and the Mississippi River. Those two outlets isolated a portion of the Valparaiso Moraine called Mount Forest Island, which today forms part of the Palos Forest Preserves, part of the Forest Preserve District of Cook County.

Later, several Native American trails passed through the area, including the ancient trail that evolved into modern Archer Avenue (Illinois Route 171).

The high bluff of Mount Forest Island overlooking this critical location has served as a lookout for centuries. The French fort on the site was visited by Father Jacques Marquette on his journeys on the Des Plaines River several times in 1673.

The community was settled by workers building the Illinois and Michigan Canal, who established their historic church in 1833. Rock quarries developed there in the mid-19th century due to the combination of an abundant supply of quality stone, and convenient transportation on the nearby canal. Though the quarries themselves no longer operate, businesses selling stone products continue in the Sag Bridge area today.

Nothing remains of the original bridge at Sag Bridge, except for an isolated remnant of Old Archer Avenue leading to the south bank of its former site, which today provides access for fishing and hiking in the Sag Quarries area of the Forest Preserve District of Cook County.

On March 27, 1991, a tornado caused significant damage to Lemont and Sag Bridge, including the historic St. James Church and cemetery.

=== The Bridge at Sag Bridge ===
The most recent bridge at Sag Bridge was built in 1934, and carries both IL 83 and IL 171 across the Calumet Sag Channel. This classic, 4-lane Pennsylvania through truss bridge is still structurally sound today; however, it is rated "functionally obsolete" due to growing traffic volumes, especially at the congested awkward 5-way signalized intersection just north of the bridge where routes 83 and 171 diverge.
