= Fairmont, Illinois =

Fairmont
- Unincorporated community Census designated place
- Location in Will County and the state of Illinois.
- Coordinates: 41°33′46″N 88°3′44″W
- Country: United States
- State: Illinois
- County: Will

Area
  - Total: 1.39 sq mi (3.60 km^{2})
  - Land: 1.39 sq mi (3.60 km^{2})
  - Water: 0 sq mi (0.00 km^{2})

Population (2020)
  - Total: 2,389
  - Density: 1,717.4/sq mi (663.11/km^{2})
- Time zone: UTC-6 (CST)
  - Summer (DST): UTC-5 (CDT)
- ZIP code: 60441
- Area codes: 815, 779
- FIPS code: 17-24920

Fairmont is an unincorporated community and census-designated place (CDP) in Will County, Illinois, United States. The population was 2,389 at the 2020 census.

== Geography ==
Fairmont is located at 41°33′46″N 88°3′44″W (41.562673, -88.062305).

According to the United States Census Bureau, the CDP has a total area of 1.6 square miles (4.1 km^{2}), all land.

== Demographics ==
Historical population
Census	Pop.	Note	%±
2000	2,563		—
2010	2,459		−4.1%
2020	2,389		−2.8%
U.S. Decennial Census; 2020

=== Racial and ethnic composition ===
Fairmont CDP, Illinois – Racial and ethnic composition Note: the US Census treats Hispanic/Latino as an ethnic category. This table excludes Latinos from the racial categories and assigns them to a separate category. Hispanics/Latinos may be of any race.
Race / Ethnicity (NH = Non-Hispanic)	Pop 2000	Pop 2010	Pop 2020	% 2000	% 2010	% 2020
White alone (NH)	839	710	659	32.74%	28.87%	27.58%
Black or African American alone (NH)	1,373	1,133	768	53.57%	46.08%	32.15%
Native American or Alaska Native alone (NH)	4	9	6	0.16%	0.37%	0.25%
Asian alone (NH)	12	8	5	0.47%	0.33%	0.21%
Native Hawaiian or Pacific Islander alone (NH)	1	0	0	0.04%	0.00%	0.00%
Other race alone (NH)	0	3	14	0.00%	0.12%	0.59%
Mixed race or Multiracial (NH)	55	41	80	2.15%	1.67%	3.35%
Hispanic or Latino (any race)	279	555	857	10.89%	22.57%	35.87%
Total	2,563	2,459	2,389	100.00%	100.00%	100.00%

=== 2020 census ===
As of the 2020 census, Fairmont had a population of 2,389. The median age was 36.4 years. 26.0% of residents were under the age of 18 and 14.1% of residents were 65 years of age or older. For every 100 females, there were 100.1 males, and for every 100 females age 18 and over, there were 97.7 males age 18 and over.

97.0% of residents lived in urban areas, while 3.0% lived in rural areas.

There were 805 households in Fairmont, of which 34.0% had children under the age of 18 living in them. Of all households, 37.1% were married-couple households, 25.0% were households with a male householder and no spouse or partner present, and 30.9% were households with a female householder and no spouse or partner present. About 28.9% of all households were made up of individuals and 11.2% had someone living alone who was 65 years of age or older.

There were 910 housing units, of which 11.5% were vacant. The homeowner vacancy rate was 0.5% and the rental vacancy rate was 13.1%.

=== 2000 census ===
At the 2000 census, there were 2,563 people, 861 households and 626 families living in the CDP. The population density was 1,555.6 inhabitants per square mile (600.6/km^{2}). There were 901 housing units at an average density of 546.9 per square mile (211.2/km^{2}). The racial makeup of the CDP was 36.17% White, 53.61% African American, 0.23% Native American, 0.47% Asian, 0.04% Pacific Islander, 6.32% from other races, and 3.16% from two or more races. Hispanic or Latino of any race were 10.89% of the population.

There were 861 households, of which 30.0% had children under the age of 18 living with them, 43.2% were married couples living together, 20.4% had a female householder with no husband present, and 27.2% were non-families. 21.8% of all households were made up of individuals, and 7.2% had someone living alone who was 65 years of age or older. The average household size was 2.97 and the average family size was 3.48.

Age distribution was 27.6% under the age of 18, 11.0% from 18 to 24, 28.1% from 25 to 44, 21.2% from 45 to 64, and 12.1% who were 65 years of age or older. The median age was 34 years. For every 100 females, there were 103.1 males. For every 100 females age 18 and over, there were 102.4 males.

The median household income was $40,907, and the median family income was $47,257. Males had a median income of $28,438 versus $26,696 for females. The per capita income for the CDP was $17,260. About 7.5% of families and 14.0% of the population were below the poverty line, including 22.3% of those under age 18 and 7.6% of those age 65 or over.

== Transportation ==
Pace provides bus service on Routes 509 and 834 connecting Fairmont to downtown Joliet and other destinations.

== Education ==
It is mostly in the Fairmont School District 89, with a piece in the Taft School District 90. All of it is in the Lockport Township High School District 205.
