= Willowbrook Ballroom =

Ballroom and banquet facility in Illinois, US

Coordinates: 41°43′43″N 87°52′54″W

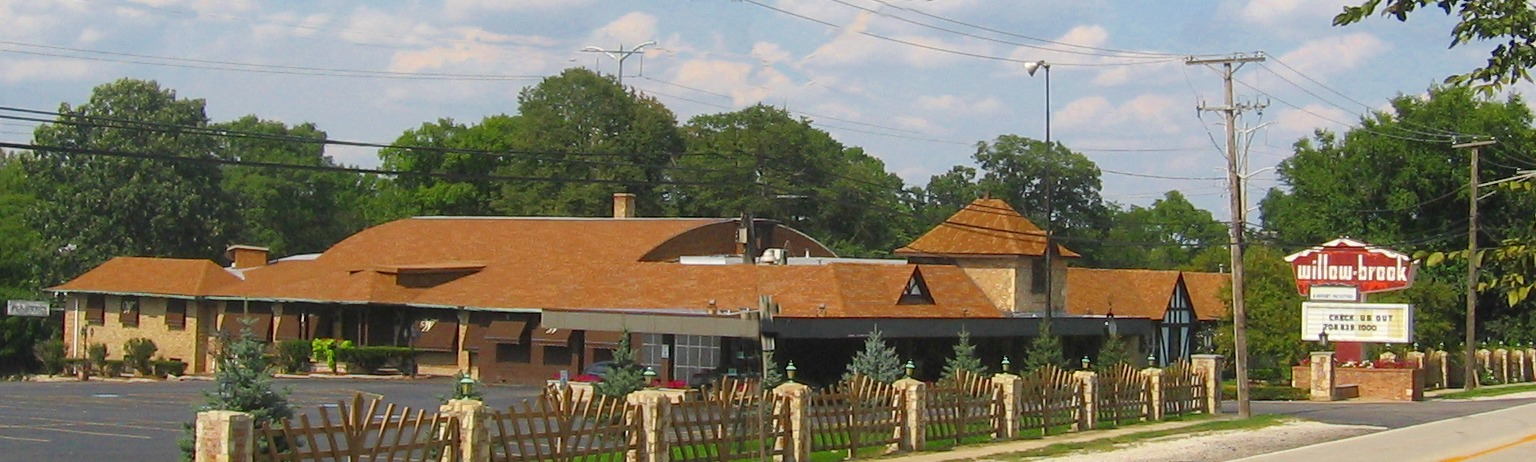
The Willowbrook Ballroom in Willow Springs, Illinois

The Willowbrook Ballroom was a dance ballroom and banquet facility located in Willow Springs, Illinois, along Archer Avenue. It was founded in 1921 by John Verderbar and named Oh Henry Park.

The Willowbrook Ballroom is often cited as the last place Resurrection Mary danced before her death. Her ghost is said to appear at the ballroom at times, dancing with the patrons.

On Friday, October 28, 2016, the Ballroom was gutted by a fire. The building was having work done on the roof where the fire was suspected of starting. Due to water pressure issues the fire department had to wait on tanker trucks, which caused a delay in getting the fire under control.

== History ==
Founded in 1921 by John Verderbar, an industrious Austrian immigrant. Verderbar purchased 5 acres (20,000 m^{2}) along wooded Archer Ave. He planned to build a peaceful weekend home.

His son, Rudy Verderbar, was one of the throngs of young people who danced at the nearly 400 ballrooms and dance halls that thrived in the Chicago area during the mid-to-late 1910s. After dancing in an outdoor pavilion in Michigan, Rudy waged a relentless campaign to scrap the idea of a summer home and build an outdoor dance pavilion. After some research, his father agreed, and in 1921, the all wooden Oh Henry Park was built. It proved so popular, in 1923, the open-air pavilion was enlarged and a new 10-cents-a-dance policy was implemented. The ballroom was supposedly named after the Oh Henry candy bar, manufactured in Chicago by the Williamson Candy Company, who paid Verderbar for the naming rights.

In 1930, the pavilion was destroyed in a devastating fire. Verderbar quickly assembled a team of 200 carpenters to construct an enormous outdoor dance floor in time for the next Saturday night. The remaining ten weeks of Oh Henry’s 1930 dance season drew even bigger crowds due to massive publicity touting the romantic aspects of "dancing under the stars."

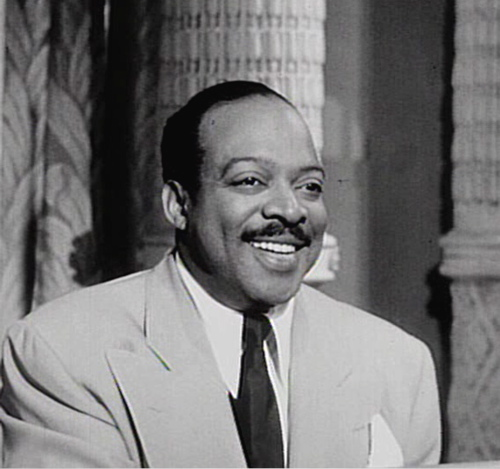
Count Basie played Willowbrook Ballroom in the 1940s.

On May 3, 1931, more than 1,700 invited guests and dignitaries danced the first dances in the new Oh Henry Ballroom. It had been built at the then-staggering Great Depression-era cost of $100,000 (equivalent to 2.1 million dollars in 2025).

As Big Band fever spread throughout 1940s America, the Oh Henry Ballroom, now with air conditioning, became a major force in the Midwest’s entertainment industry. Even during the Second World War, typical weekly attendance was about 10,000 dancers. The ballroom’s popularity was reason for Chicago bus lines to be rerouted to provide direct service to and from the ballroom.

Willowbrook Ballroom attracted some of the most popular bands of their times including Ozzie Nelson and his orchestra in the 1930s with lead singer Harriet Hilliard. The 1940s orchestras of Harry James, Les Brown and Count Basie played the ballroom, and singers Frank Sinatra, Doris Day And Helen O'Connell graced the stage, later so did Wayne King, Guy Lombardo, Sammy Kaye, Jimmy Dorsey, Bob Crosby, Dick Jurgens, Glenn Miller Orchestra and Gene Krupa. Theatre organist Hal Pearl known as "The King of the Organ" occasionally played in the ballroom between sets and sometimes offered his own concerts.

In 1955, as ballrooms across the country scaled down or closed, the Verderbars set out on a course to further expand their operations. A 20,000-foot (6,100 m) addition installed new kitchens, a restaurant and a private room for parties and banquets.

In 1959 the entire Oh Henry complex was renamed Willowbrook Ballroom. The 1960s were bringing record crowds to the ballroom, but toward the end of that decade, the public’s taste in entertainment underwent a radical change and fewer people took up ballroom dancing.

Willowbrook Ballroom survived by having contemporary bands share the stage on the same evening with the top ballroom bands.

As popular music changed, the entertainers on Willowbrook’s stage also changed, particularly on Friday night. Chubby Checker played the ballroom as did The Cryan' Shames, The Association, The Buckinghams, Otis Day and the Knights, Duke Tumatoe and The All Star Frogs, The Village People, and Martha Reeves. Songwriter James Holvay first saw Carl Bonafede at the age of 14 when Carl was singing at The Willowbrook Ballroom as a front man for the Gem-Tones. It was one of Jim Lounsbury's local record hops.

In the 1980's, the Sunday afternoon Tea Dance was "billed as an over-40 dance" said a fox-trotting patron interviewed by Ron Grossman for the Chicago Tribune. "But over 60 more accurately describes most of us." Many were divorced or widowed senior citizens.

In 1997 the Verderbar family sold the Ballroom to Birute and Gediminas Jodwalis. The Willowbrook Ballroom is located at 8900 Archer Avenue, Willow Springs, Illinois, 60480.

In 2000 The Willowbrook Ballroom was profiled as one of America's "Glorious, Historic, Legendary, Treasured Ballroom Dance Floors" in Amateur Dancers magazine. Criteria for being profiled as an Amateur Dancers magazine's "Finest Floor" is:

1. A minimum of 3,500 square feet (330 m^{2}) of danceable wood flooring, sprung preferred.
2. Sufficient room for 300 or more dancers.
3. Adequate sound and heating/cooling system.
4. Currently operating with a 25-year history or more.

On October 28, 2016 the Willowbrook Ballroom was again destroyed by a massive, multi-alarm fire.

As of early Spring 2017 the Dance of Life Foundation—a Burr Ridge-based nonprofit organization—claims to have raised nearly $2 million to rebuild the historic ballroom.

On Feb. 25, 2019 Crain's Chicago Business reported that suburban construction firm Westpoint Builders had purchased, on Feb. 13, 2019, half of the Willowbrook Ballroom site for 1.25 million dollars. When finished, the new construction on the site is said to include 168 condominiums and 42 townhomes. As of Oct. 28, 2021 there has been no announcement about the sale of the other half of the property, and the property as a whole is now apartments as of June 25, 2023.
