= Indian Springs School District 109 =

School district in Illinois, United States

Address
- 7540 South 86th Avenue Justice, Illinois, 60458; United States

District information
- Type: Public
- Grades: PreK–8
- NCES District ID: 1707170

Students and staff
- Students: 2,486

Other information
- Website: www.isd109.org

Indian Springs School District 109 (ISD 109) is a school district headquartered in Justice, Illinois, in the Chicago metropolitan area. It operates elementary schools and one junior high school.

== Schools ==
- Wilkins Junior High School (Justice)

Elementary schools:

- Bridgeview Elementary School (Bridgeview)
- Brodnicki Elementary School (Justice)
- Lyle Elementary School (Bridgeview)
- Wilkins Elementary School (Justice)

Early childhood:

- Gladness V. Player Early Childhood Center (Justice)
