= Justice, Illinois =

- Village
- logo
- Motto(s): Peaceful, pretty, and proud
- Location of Justice in Cook County, Illinois.

- Location within Greater Chicago Location within Illinois Location within the United States
- Coordinates: 41°44′47″N 87°50′4″W
- Country: United States
- State: Illinois
- County: Cook

Area
  - Total: 2.88 sq mi (7.47 km^{2})
  - Land: 2.84 sq mi (7.35 km^{2})
  - Water: 0.046 sq mi (0.12 km^{2})

Population (2020)
  - Total: 12,600
  - Density: 4,437.0/sq mi (1,713.15/km^{2})
- Time zone: UTC-6 (CST)
  - Summer (DST): UTC-5 (CDT)
- ZIP code: 60458
- Area code: 708
- FIPS code: 17-38830
- Wikimedia Commons: Justice, Illinois
- Website: www.villageofjustice.org

Justice is a village in Cook County, Illinois, United States, established in 1911. Per the 2020 census, the population was 12,600.

== Geography ==
According to the 2021 census gazetteer files, Justice has a total area of 2.89 square miles (7.49 km^{2}), of which 2.84 square miles (7.36 km^{2}) (or 98.44%) is land and 0.05 square miles (0.13 km^{2}) (or 1.56%) is water.

A major road running through the town is Archer Avenue (Illinois Route 171); in addition, Justice lies close to Interstate 55 (also called the Stevenson Expressway, after Adlai Stevenson) and Interstate 294 just east of La Grange Road (U.S. Route 45).

Justice is home to Resurrection Cemetery, a Roman Catholic Cemetery in the Archdiocese of Chicago, and the Lithuanian National Cemetery.

Neighboring communities are Hickory Hills, Bridgeview, Bedford Park and Willow Springs.

== Demographics ==
As of the 2020 census, there were 12,600 people residing in the village.

=== Racial and ethnic composition ===
Justice village, Illinois – Racial and ethnic composition Note: the US Census treats Hispanic/Latino as an ethnic category. This table excludes Latinos from the racial categories and assigns them to a separate category. Hispanics/Latinos may be of any race.
Race / Ethnicity (NH = Non-Hispanic)	Pop 2000	Pop 2010	Pop 2020	% 2000	% 2010	% 2020
White alone (NH)	8,127	8,038	7,442	66.65%	62.18%	59.06%
Black or African American alone (NH)	2,420	2,863	2,516	19.85%	22.15%	19.97%
Native American or Alaska Native alone (NH)	12	15	18	0.10%	0.12%	0.14%
Asian alone (NH)	207	222	224	1.70%	1.72%	1.78%
Pacific Islander alone (NH)	2	1	0	0.02%	0.01%	0.00%
Other race alone (NH)	22	11	29	0.18%	0.09%	0.23%
Mixed race or Multiracial (NH)	475	181	294	3.90%	1.40%	2.33%
Hispanic or Latino (any race)	928	1,595	2,077	7.61%	12.34%	16.48%
Total	12,193	12,926	12,600	100.00%	100.00%	100.00%

=== 2020 census ===
The median age was 36.5 years. 23.5% of residents were under the age of 18 and 13.2% of residents were 65 years of age or older. For every 100 females, there were 93.4 males, and for every 100 females age 18 and over, there were 91.3 males age 18 and over.

100.0% of residents lived in urban areas, while 0.0% lived in rural areas.

There were 4,810 households, of which 32.7% had children under the age of 18 living in them. Of all households, 40.2% were married-couple households, 21.2% were households with a male householder and no spouse or partner present, and 31.7% were households with a female householder and no spouse or partner present. About 27.3% of all households were made up of individuals and 9.1% had someone living alone who was 65 years of age or older.

The population density was 4,367.42 inhabitants per square mile (1,686.27/km^{2}). There were 5,160 housing units at an average density of 1,788.56 per square mile (690.57/km^{2}), of which 6.8% were vacant. The homeowner vacancy rate was 1.3% and the rental vacancy rate was 8.6%.

=== Income and poverty ===
The median income for a household in the village was $57,523, and the median income for a family was $64,258. Males had a median income of $40,647 versus $30,441 for females. The per capita income for the village was $27,526. About 16.1% of families and 18.8% of the population were below the poverty line, including 29.6% of those under age 18 and 20.2% of those age 65 or over.

Historical population
Census	Pop.	Note	%±
1920	183		—
1930	377		106.0%
1940	499		32.4%
1950	854		71.1%
1960	2,803		228.2%
1970	9,473		238.0%
1980	10,552		11.4%
1990	11,137		5.5%
2000	12,193		9.5%
2010	12,926		6.0%
2020	12,600		−2.5%
U.S. Decennial Census; 2010 2020

== Government ==
The Village President is Krzysztof (Kris) Wasowicz. The Village Clerk is David R. Kroll. Village Trustees are Jeffrey Allen, Gabriel Lopez, Melanie Kuban, Frances Mills, John Obrochta, and Stanislaw Ogorek.

Justice is in Illinois's 3rd congressional district.

== Education ==
Elementary and middle school students from Justice attend schools in Indian Springs School District 109. High school students go on to Argo Community High School District 217 in neighboring Summit.

== Transportation ==
Pace provides bus service on multiple routes connecting Justice to destinations across the Southland.
