= Boersma =

Boersma is a West Frisian occupational surname meaning "farmer('s son)". In 2007 6916 people in the Netherlands carried the name. Variant forms are Boorsma, Boerema, Boerma, Boersema. People with the name include:

- Age Hains Boersma (b. 1982), Dutch football player
- Anna Boersma (b. 2001), Dutch speed skater
- Cintha Boersma (b. 1969), Dutch volleyball player
- Emiel Boersma (b. 1980), Dutch volleyball player
- Femke Boersma (1935–2026), Dutch actress
- Francisco VanderHoff Boersma (b. 1939), Dutch missionary who cofounded the Fairtrade label in Latin America
- Gerard Boersma (b. 1976), Dutch painter
- Hans Boersma (b. 1961), Dutch-American theologian
- Jaap Boersma (1929–2012), Dutch politician
- Jan Boersma (b. 1968), Dutch sailboarder
- Jay W. Boersma (b. 1947), American photographer, designer, and creative director
- Johannes Boersma (1937–2004), Dutch mathematician
- Johannes Sipko Boersma (b. 1935), Dutch archaeologist
- P. Dee Boersma (b. 1946), American conservation biologist
- Paul Boersma (b. 1959), Dutch phonetician
- Phil Boersma (b. 1949), English footballer
- Tjeerd Boersma (1915–1985), Dutch sprinter

Boerma

- Addeke Hendrik Boerma (1912–1992), Dutch civil servant, first director of the UN World Food Programme
- Anthonius Cornelis Boerma (1852–1908), Dutch architect
- Marcella Boerma (b. 1970), Dutch snowboarder
- Scott Boerma (b. 1964), American composer
- Thomas Boerma (b. 1981), Dutch field hockey player

Boorsma

- Alie Boorsma (b. 1959), Dutch speed skater
