= Boerma =

Boerma is a surname. Notable people with the surname include:

- Addeke Hendrik Boerma (1912–1992), Dutch civil servant
- Anthonius Cornelis Boerma (1852–1908), Dutch architect
- Hanneke Boerma (born 1975), Dutch diplomat and politician
- Scott Boerma (born 1964), American composer
- Thomas Boerma (born 1981), Dutch field hockey player

== See also ==
- Boersma
