= Roman Catholic Diocese of Dolia =

Latin Catholic diocese in Italy

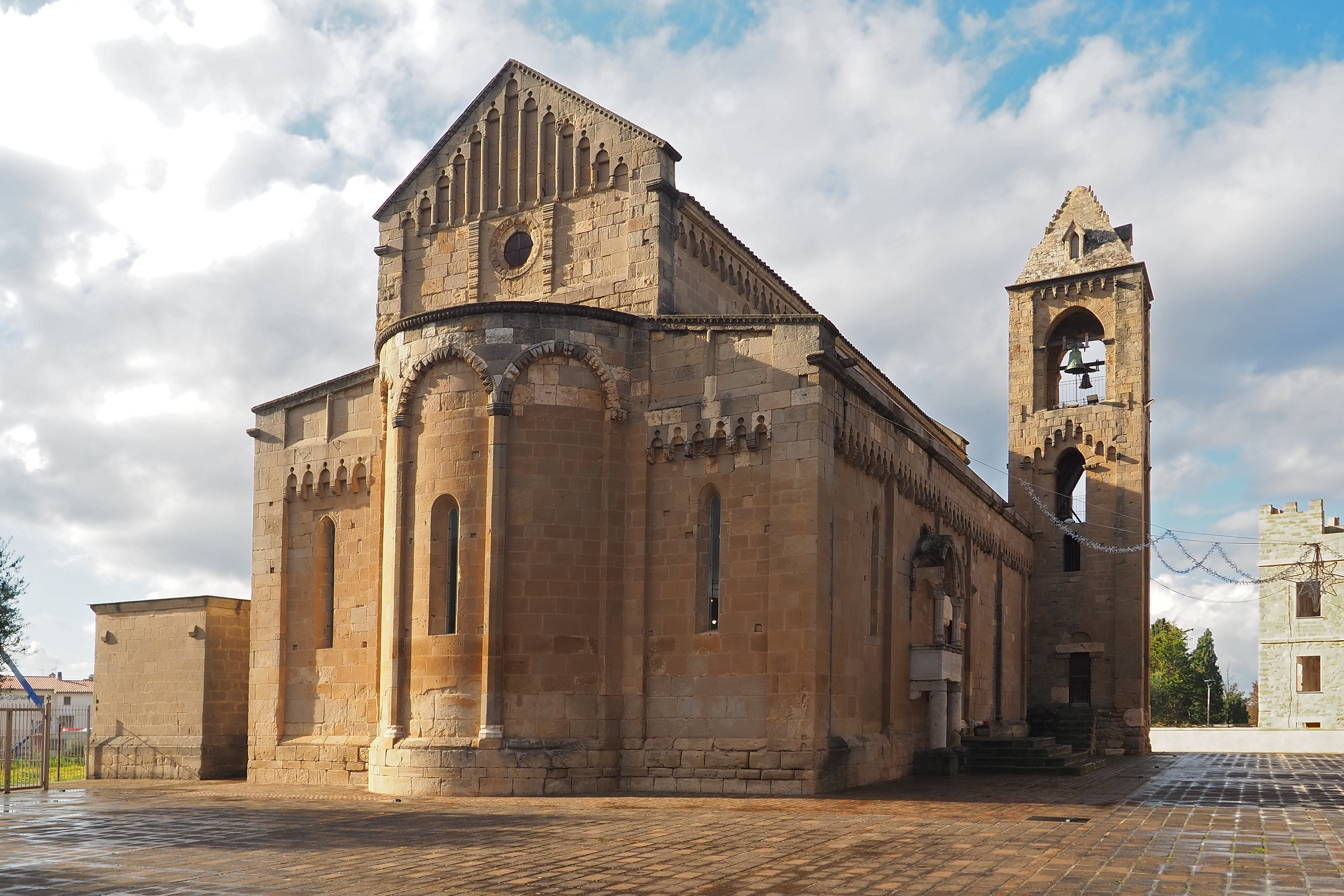
Former cathedral of S. Pantaleone, Dolianova

The Diocese of Dolia (Latin: Dioecesis Doliensis) was a Roman Catholic diocese, whose episcopal seat was located in the town of Dolianova in the Province of Cagliari in the Italian region Sardinia. Established in the 11th century, it was a suffragan (subordinate) of the metropolitan of Cagliari. The diocese was suppressed (abolished) in 1503 by Pope Julius II.

== History ==
The modern town of Dolianova was formerly the seat of a diocese called Dolia (Doglia). The diocese was established before the year 1100; Bishop Virgilio is attested on 31 May 1089.

=== Cathedral ===
The earliest reference to the cathedral of S. Pantaleon occurs in a document of 1112. An inscription above the lateral door indicates that it was a gift of Bishop Pietro di Cili in 1261. The medieval building was enlarged and renovated, and re-dedicated in 1289. The cathedral was staffed and administered by a corporation called the Chapter, which consisted of twelve canons, one of whom was the Dean.

In 1253, a general synod of the prelates of Sardinia was held at Santa Maria di Bonarcado, under the presidency of Archbishop Prospero of Torres, as papal legate. The bishop of Dolia, whose name is not recorded, attended.

Pope Innocent VI dealt a severe rebuke to the Chapter of the cathedral of S. Pantaleon in 1355. Following the death of Bishop Saladin, unaware or heedless of a papal decree reserving the appointment of the next bishop to the pope, the Chapter proceeded to conduct an election of Saladin's successor. They chose concorditer Fra Joannes de Bardaxino, who was also apparently unaware of the reservation; he obtained the license of his Franciscan Superior to accept the election, and only subsequently was told of the reservation. He immediately travelled to Avignon, where he related the whole business to the pope in consistory.Innocent VI immediately voided the election by the Chapter, ruling that no one except him had the right to make provision for the diocese on this occasion. After deliberation, however, he decided to appoint Fra Joannes de Bardaxino, and issued his ruling on 26 October 1355. No bishop of Dolia attended King Peter IV's first royal Court at Cagliari on 10 March 1355.

In 1358, during the uprisings in Sardinia against the Crown of Aragon, the archbishop of Torres (Sassari), who was serving as papal nuncio in Sardinia, and the bishops of Suelli and Dolia supported King Peter IV of Aragon in his efforts to use the taxes imposed on the church in Sardinia by Pope Innocent VI.

=== Western schism ===
Following the disruptive papal conclaves of 1378, the first of which was beset with fear and violence, governments had to choose which of the claimants to the papal throne they would support. King Peter IV of Aragon and Sardinia (1336–1387) chose to support neither claimant, stating that he was "indifferent." His uncertainty provided a legal pretext for sequestering the ecclesiastical funds due the papacy in the territories of the kingdom of Aragon, which were then used to finance royal projects, notably putting down the rebellion in Sardinia. His successors, John I (1387–1396) and Martin I (1396–1410), however, under the influence of the Cardinal of Aragon, Pedro de Luna, openly supported the Avignon Papacy; and when Pedro de Luna became Benedict XIII in 1394, he enjoyed the full support of the kings in governing the Church in Sardinia.

None of the Sardinian bishops attended the Council of Pisa (1409), though Archbishop Primus of Torres (Sassari) and Bishop Francisco of Terralba were represented by a procurator. On 5 June 1409, the ouncil excommunicated and deposed both Benedict XIII and Gregory XII. The Sardinian bishops, in any case, had more pressing problems. In his war of reconquest of Sicily King Martin I of Aragon and Sardinia had required troops from his vassals in Sardinia. When King Martin died on 31 May 1410, rebellion broke out, led by the notables of Arborea.

In 1435, Pope Eugenius IV, who had embarked on a project to repair the damages caused by the Western Schism (1378–1417), appointed the Bishop of Dolia, Nicholas de Pinu, his Nuncio, Visitator, and Reformator, along with the archdeacon of Agrigento (Grirenti), to conduct a thorough assessment of the eccclesiastical institutions in Sardinia, and to correct whatever abuses he was able.

In 1492, all Jews in Spain who had not converted to Christianity were expelled, and their property was confiscated. The orders applied to the island of Sardinia as well, and were enforced by the Viceroy, Juan Dusay. Synagogues were converted into Catholic churches, and were all named Santa Croce.

=== Suppression ===
The diocese's seat was vacant since the death of Bishop Pietro Ferrer in 1502. On 8 December 1503, after extensive consultations had taken place between King Ferdinand of Aragon and Sardinia, Isabella I of Castile, and Pope Alexander VI, and after discussions with members of the College of Cardinals (including Cardinal Giuliano della Rovere) and other interested parties, and after additional consultations by Pope Julius II, the diocese of Dolia was suppressed, and its territory united to the archdiocese of Cagliari.

It was revived as a Catholic titular see by Pope Paul VI in 1969.

== Bishops of Dolia ==
- Virgilius (c. 1089)
- Benedictus (c. 1112)
- Albertus (c. 1114–1120)

...

- Rudolfus (c. 1163)

...

- Gratianus Pizzolo (c. 1217–1236)
- Petrus (c. 1261)

...

- Orlandus, O.P. (c. 1317)
- Gabriele, O.S.B. (1319–1342?)
- Francesco di Doglia (1326–1334)
- Saladino Pisanello (1342–1355)
- Giovanni de Bardaxino, O.F.M. (26 Oct 1355–1362?)
- Nicola Aleri (4 Apr 1362 – )
- Juan (1366–1388)
- Giovanni (15 Jul 1389 – ), Avignon Obedience
- Secondo de Moris, O.F.M. (5 Dec 1390 – 1393), Roman Obedience
- Giacomo di Borgo, O.E.S.A. (28 Jul 1393 – 1397), Roman Obedience
- Nicola de Bonifacio, O.P. (12 Aug 1398 – ), Roman Obedience
- Ludovico de Turri, O.F.M. (27 Jan 1410 – ), Avignon Obedience
- Goffredo Sigarla, O.F.M. (27 Mar 1411 – )
- Giovanni di San Paolo, O.P. (23 Aug 1419 – )
- Bernardino Maja, O.P. (1422 – 1428)
- Nicolo de Pinu (14 Feb 1435 – 1443)
- Juan Anadon, O.F.M. (6 Sep 1443 – 1451 resigned)
- Antonio Proavus (26 May 1451 – after 1475)
- Pietro Pilares (1476–1484)
- Raimundo de Loaria (1484 – 1495)
- Pietro Ferrer, O.S.A. (1495–1502)

=== Titular Bishops ===
- Lorenzo Unfried Gimpel, M.F.S.C. (1969–1980)
- Friedrich Ostermann (1981–2018)
- Kevin Michael Birmingham (2020–2023)
- Flavio Pace (23 Feb 2024–pres.)

== See also ==
- Dolianova Cathedral
- Archdiocese of Cagliari
- Catholic Church in Italy

== Sources ==
=== Episcopal lists ===
- Eubel, Conradus, ed. (1913). Hierarchia catholica (in Latin). Vol. 1 (Tomus 1) (second ed.). Münster: Libreria Regensbergiana. p. 226.. Archived.
- Eubel, Conradus, ed. (1914). Hierarchia catholica (in Latin). Vol. 2 (Tomus 2) (second ed.). Münster: Libreria Regensbergiana. p. 145.. Archived.
- Gams, Pius Bonifatius (1873). Series episcoporum Ecclesiae catholicae: quotquot innotuerunt a beato Petro apostolo. Ratisbon: Typis et Sumptibus Georgii Josephi Manz. p. 837. (Use with caution; obsolete)

=== Studies ===
- Cappelletti, Giuseppe (1857). Le chiese d'Italia dalla loro origine sino ai nostri giorni (in Italian). Vol. decimoterzo (13). Venezia: Antonelli. pp. 74–75.. [a multitude of mistakes, not authoritative]
- Forci, Antonio. "Fra Giovanni de Formentera, vescovo agostiniano di Dolia in Sardegna (1389-1407)." (in Italian). In: Percorsi Agostiniani. Rivista degli Agostiniani d'Italia, vol. 11, no. 21 (Roma: Centro Culturale Agostiniano 2018), pp. 37–56.
- Kehr, Paul Fridolin. Italia Pontificia (in Latin), Vol. X: Calabria – Insulae (Turici: Weidmann 1975). (p. 417).
- Martini, Pietro (1841). Storia ecclesiastica di Sardegna. Volume 3 Cagliari: Stamperia Reale, 1841. (pp. 367-369)
- Mattei, Antonio Felice (1758). Sardinia sacra, seu De episcopis Sardis historia nunc primò confecta a F. Antonio Felice Matthaejo. (in Latin). Romae: ex typographia Joannis Zempel apud Montem Jordanum, 1758. Pp. 110-114.
- Usai, Nicoletta; Nonne, Claudio. [2018]. "L'antica cattedrale di San Pantaleo a Dolianova (Cagliari).", (in Italian), in: IV Ciclo di Studi Medievali, Atti del Convegno, Firenze, 4-5 giugno 2018 (Firenze: NUME 2018), pp. 497–504.
- Tola, Pasquale (1861). Codex diplomaticus Sardiniae, (in Latin) Vol. 1. Torino: e regia Typographeo 1861.

==== External links ====
- David M. Cheney, Catholic-Hierarchy.org, "Diocese of Dolia (Doglia);" retrieved 31 December 2025.
- Cheney, David M., Catholic-Hierarchy.org, "Dolia" (titular see).
- Acta Apostolicae Sedis (index)
