= Dwight D. Eisenhower High School (Blue Island, Illinois) =

Public high school in Illinois, United States

Location
- 12700 S. Sacramento Avenue; Blue Island, Illinois 60406; United States
- Coordinates: 41°39′39″N 87°41′50″W

Information
- School type: Public secondary
- Established: 1897; 129 years ago
- School district: Community HS 218
- Superintendent: Josh Barron
- Principal: Benjamin Blakeley
- Teaching staff: 135.90 (FTE)
- Grades: 9–12
- Gender: Coed
- Enrollment: 1,818 (2024–2025)
- Student to teacher ratio: 13.38
- Campus type: Suburban
- Colors: Cardinal Red; White
- Athletics conference: South Suburban
- Nickname: Cards
- Team name: Cardinals
- Newspaper: Red & White
- Yearbook: The Crest
- Website: eisenhower.chsd218.org

Dwight D. Eisenhower High School (Eisenhower, EHS, or Ike) is a public four-year high school located in Blue Island, Illinois, a southern suburb of Chicago, Illinois, in the United States. It is part of Community High School District 218 along with sister schools Alan B. Shepard High School and Harold L. Richards High School.

Eisenhower is a diverse school with a balanced student body of Caucasian, Hispanic and African American students. Eisenhower serves students from the communities of Blue Island, Calumet Park, Robbins, Alsip, Merrionette Park, Posen, Deer Pointe & Garden Homes. The current enrollment is over 1,800 students.

== History ==
The school was founded as Blue Island Community High School in 1897 and as such was the first constituent educational institution that today comprises Community High School District 218, which was established in 1927. Blue Island Community High School was accredited by the North Central Association of Colleges and Secondary Schools (now North Central Association - Commission on Accreditation and School Improvement) in 1899. As president of Columbia University, Dwight D. Eisenhower was the keynote speaker at the dedication of the current facility on Sacramento Ave. in 1951, and the building was renamed in his honor in 1962.

== Athletics ==
Eisenhower competes in the South Suburban Conference (SSC) and is a member of the Illinois High School Association (IHSA), the association which governs most sports and competitive activities in the state. School colors are Cardinal Red and White. Teams are stylized as the Cardinals.

The school sponsors interscholastic teams for young men and women in basketball, bowling, cross country, soccer, swimming & diving, tennis, track & field, and volleyball. Young men may compete in baseball, football, wrestling while young women may compete in softball. There is also a coed golf team. The school's athletic department supports the district teams which compete in the Special Olympics.

The following teams have finished in the top four of their respective IHSA sponsored state championship tournaments or meets:

- Tennis (Boys): State Champions (1949–50)
- Track & Field (Boys): State Champions (1954–55)
- Soccer (Boys): (2010–11)

== Notable alumni ==
- Jay W. Boersma (class of 1965), fine art and documentary photographer, mixed media artist, designer, and creative director
- Don Kolloway was a Major League Baseball infielder (1940–43, 1946–53), playing most of his career with the Chicago White Sox.
- Willie May is a former hurdler who won a silver medal in the 110 meter hurdles at the 1960 Summer Olympics.
- Douglas A. Melton is the co-director of the Harvard University Stem Cell Institute. He was listed as one of Time Magazine's 100 most influential people in the world (2007 & 2009).
- Rick Rizzs is a sportscaster, best known for his time with the Seattle Mariners.
- Jim Smith was a wide receiver for the University of Michigan and the Pittsburgh Steelers, winning two Super Bowl championships.
- Robert Thompson, NFL linebacker.
- Brandon Williams is a tight end with the NFL's Miami Dolphins.
