= Kevin M. Birmingham =

American Roman Catholic bishop (1971–2023)

His Excellency, The Most Reverend Kevin Michael Birmingham
- Auxiliary Bishop of Chicago
- See: Archdiocese of Chicago
- Appointed: September 11, 2020
- Installed: November 13, 2020
- Term ended: October 2, 2023
- Other post: Titular Bishop of Dolia (2020–2023)

Orders
- Ordination: May 24, 1997 by Francis George
- Consecration: November 13, 2020 by Blase J. Cupich, John R. Manz, and Joseph N. Perry

Personal details
- Born: October 7, 1971 Oak Lawn, Illinois, U.S.
- Died: October 2, 2023 (aged 51) Riverside, Illinois, U.S.
- Education: Loyola University Chicago; University of Saint Mary of the Lake; Niles College Seminary
- Motto: Tend my people

Styles of Kevin Michael Birmingham
- Reference style: His Excellency; The Most Reverend
- Spoken style: Your Excellency
- Religious style: Bishop

Kevin Michael Birmingham (October 7, 1971 – October 2, 2023) was an American prelate of the Roman Catholic Church who was named auxiliary bishop for the Archdiocese of Chicago in 2020.

== Biography ==
=== Early life ===
Kevin Birmingham was born on October 7, 1971, in Oak Lawn, Illinois, the seventh of ten children. He attended public primary school in the Chicago Ridge School District in Chicago Ridge, Illinois. Birmingham then entered Quigley Preparatory Seminary South in Chicago. To pay for bus transportation to Quigley, Birmingham worked a paper route and odd jobs.

After graduating from Quigley, Birmingham entered Loyola University Chicago in 1987. He was originally planning to major in computer science but soon decided to enter the priesthood. Birmingham transferred in 1989 to Niles College Seminary at Loyola, graduating in 1993 with a Bachelor of Philosophy degree. Birmingham then attended University of St. Mary of the Lake, obtaining a degree in 1997.

=== Priesthood ===
On May 24, 1997, Birmingham was ordained to the priesthood by Cardinal Francis George. After his ordination, Birmingham traveled to Mexico City, where he celebrated his second mass as a priest at the Basilica of Our Lady of Guadalupe.

Returning to Illinois, Birmingham was assigned as associated pastor for St. Peter Claver Mission Parish in Robbins, Illinois. He was transferred in 2001 to the same position at St. Benedict Parish in Blue Island, Illinois. In 2001, Birmingham started serving at St. Francis of Assisi Parish in Orland Park, Illinois. In 2005, Birmingham was named pastor of St. Anne Parish in Hazel Crest, Illinois, staying there until 2011. From 2005 to 2009, he also served on the Priests’ Placement Board for the archdiocese. Birmingham joined the Presbyteral Council in 2006. In 2011, he was appointed pastor of Maternity of the Blessed Virgin Mary Parish in Chicago and in 2013 dean of Deanery III-A.

=== Episcopal ministry ===
Pope Francis appointed Birmingham as an auxiliary bishop for the Archdiocese of Chicago and titular bishop of Dolia on September 11, 2020. On November 13, 2020, he was consecrated at Holy Name Cathedral in Chicago.

On weekends, Birmingham celebrated mass in Spanish at St. John Berchmans Parish in Chicago.

Birmingham was episcopal vicar of Vicariate IV in Chicago. When Pope Francis accepted the resignation of Auxiliary Bishop Joseph N. Perry on September 19, 2023, Blase Cardinal Cupich, archbishop of Chicago, appointed Birmingham to be Perry's replacement as episcopal vicar of Vicariate VI.

=== Death ===
Birmingham's grave at Holy Sepulchre Cemetery

Birmingham died in his sleep on October 2, 2023, at age 51. He was buried at Holy Sepulchre Cemetery in Alsip, Illinois.

== See also ==
- Catholic Church hierarchy
- Catholic Church in the United States
- Historical list of the Catholic bishops of the United States
- List of Catholic bishops of the United States
- Lists of patriarchs, archbishops, and bishops

Catholic Church titles
Preceded by —	Auxiliary Bishop of Chicago; 2020–2023	Succeeded by —
Preceded by Friedrich Ostermann	Titular Bishop of Dolia; 2020–2023	Succeeded by Vacant
