= Richards High School =

Richards High School may refer to:

- Harold L. Richards High School in Oak Lawn, Illinois
- Richards Career Academy in Chicago, Illinois
