= Cruquius =

Nicolaus Samuel Cruquius was a Dutch land-surveyor, cartographer, and land reclamation engineer.

Named in his honor are:

- Cruquius, Netherlands is a village in the Haarlemmermeer in the Netherlands.
- Museum De Cruquius - a former steam pumping station on the edge of the Haarlemmermeer, now made into a museum.
- Cruquiuseiland - an area of Amsterdam
