= Alan B. Shepard High School =

Public school in Palos Heights, Illinois, US

Location
- 13049 S. Ridgeland Avenue 6767; Palos Heights, Illinois 60463; United States
- Coordinates: 41.6551°N 87.7744°W

Information
- School type: public secondary
- Opened: 1976
- School district: Community HS 218
- Superintendent: Josh Barron
- Principal: Timothy Baker, Ed.D.
- Staff: 173
- Teaching staff: 121.60 (FTE)
- Grades: 9–12
- Gender: coed
- Enrollment: 1,960 (2023-2024)
- Average class size: 22.4
- Student to teacher ratio: 16.12
- Campus type: suburban
- Colors: Brown; Orange
- Song: We're the Astros
- Fight song: Fight, Fight for Shepard High
- Athletics conference: South Suburban Conference
- Team name: Astros; Lady Astros
- Publication: Spectrum
- Newspaper: Freedom 7
- Yearbook: Odyssey
- Alumni: http://shepardalumni.com/
- Website: http://shepard.chsd218.org/

Alan B. Shepard High School is a public secondary school located in Palos Heights, Illinois, a southwest suburb of Chicago. The school is part of Community High School District 218, along with Dwight D. Eisenhower High School and Harold L. Richards High School. Students who attend the school live in the communities of Palos Heights, Crestwood, Worth, Alsip, Robbins, and Calumet Park. The school is named in honor of Alan B. Shepard, the first American astronaut to travel into space and the fifth person to walk on the Moon.

== History ==
As early as 1966, District 218 began looking for a site for a third high school. The school and local residents argued between two sites located on either side of the intersection of 120th Street and Pulaski Avenue in Alsip. In 1972, the district asked voters in the district to approve a bond issue to raise money for a new school to be located in Palos Heights. Most recently Alan B. Shepard High School has ranked 54th in Illinois and 2,062nd nationally.

== Academics ==
In 2008, Shepard had an average composite ACT score of 19.7, and graduated 86.4% of its senior class. The school has not made Adequate Yearly Progress (AYP) on the Prairie State Achievement Examination, which is the state assessment used to fulfill mandates of the federal No Child Left Behind Act. Overall, the school failed to meet minimum standards in reading and mathematics, in addition to having three of the school's four student subgroups fail to meet expectations in reading and mathematics.

== Student life ==
=== Activities ===
The school offers over 30 extracurricular clubs ranging from student publications and academic competitions to service and special interest clubs. Clubs which are chapters or affiliates of nationally notable organizations include Future Educators of America, Key Club, Leo Club, and Quill and Scroll. The school also has an alumni organization serving graduates and faculty.

=== Extracurricular Success ===
The School's extracurricular success overshadows that of their athletic success. The Shepard Marching Astros, Shepard Mathletes, Shepard Show Choir, and Shepard Speech Team have been the most successful in their respective domains. The most notable of which being the Shepard speech sending state qualifiers to the IHSA state tournament every year. The Team hosting six recent state champions including: Kirsten LaMantia in Special Occasion Speaking (2003) Jasmine Lockett in Original Oratory (2009) Amy Ramelli in Original Comedy (2010) Leah Ellis in Special Occasions Speaking (2011) Glorielle Williams in Poetry Reading (2012) Lindsie Bliss in Informative Speaking (2014).

=== Athletics ===
Shepard competes in the South Suburban Conference and is a member of the Illinois High School Association (IHSA); the organization which governs most sports and competitive activities in the state. Teams are stylized as the Astros (for men) and Lady Astros (for women).

The school sponsors interscholastic teams for young men and women in basketball, bowling, cross country, soccer, swimming & diving, tennis, track & field, volleyball, and water polo. Young men may compete in baseball, football, golf, wrestling while young women may compete in badminton, cheerleading, and softball. While not sponsored by the IHSA, the school also sponsors a poms team for young women.

The school's badminton team is the only athletic team to place in the top four of their IHSA sponsored state tournament, placing third twice (1979–80, 1991–92) and second twice (1990–91, 1997–98).

== Notable alumni ==
- Matt Bellassai, comedian, People’s Choice Award winner
- Cliff Benson, National Football League tight end (1984–1988)
- David Knox, guitarist of pop-punk band Real Friends
- Ron Mahay, Major League Baseball relief pitcher (1995, 1997–2010)
- David Prychitko, economist of the Austrian school
