= Chicago Ridge School District =

School district in Illinois, United States

Address
- 6135 108th Street Chicago Ridge, Illinois, 60415; United States

District information
- Type: Public
- Grades: PreK–8
- NCES District ID: 1709990

Students and staff
- Students: 1,443

Other information
- Website: www.crsd1275.org

Chicago Ridge School District 127½ is a school district headquartered in the Dr. Bernard Jumbeck Administrative Center in Chicago Ridge, Illinois.

Most of Chicago Ridge and a portion of Oak Lawn are in the district boundaries. It operates three schools: Finley Junior High School, Ridge Central School (elementary), and Ridge Lawn School (elementary). Community High School District 218 covers areas covered by this school district, and therefore the feeder high school is Harold L. Richards High School.

== History ==
Finley Jr. High School opened in 1970. The superintendent was Elden Finley.

A strike occurred in 2005.

In 2025, the superintendent was Dr. Adam Thorns.

In March, Leighanne Kaczmarek was named the principal of Ridge Lawn School, after being assistant principal at the school for eight years.

On April 10th, Sarah Abdelhadi was named the principal of Ridge Central, following the resignation of previous principal Katy King.

== Student body ==
In 2005 it had about 1,300 students, and in 2020 it had about 1,550 students enrolled. In 2025, there were about 1,443 students enrolled in the district.
