= Benedict of Cagliari =

Italian bishop and saint

Saint Benedict of Cagliari

Bishop of Dolia
- Died: 1112; Dolia, Sardinia
- Venerated in: Roman Catholic Church
- Feast: 17 February

Benedict of Cagliari was a Benedictine Bishop of Dolia, Sardinia. He was a monk at the abbey of St. Saturninus, in that city when he was made bishop in 1107. Serving for five years, Benedict then retired to the basilica abbey.
