= Sebastian Castro (American football) =

American football player (born 2000)

No. 49 – Pittsburgh Steelers
- Position: Safety
- Roster status: Practice squad

Personal information
- Born: October 14, 2000 (age 26); Oak Lawn, Illinois, U.S.
- Listed height: 5 ft 11 in (1.80 m)
- Listed weight: 203 lb (92 kg)

Career information
- High school: Richards (Oak Lawn)
- College: Iowa (2019–2024)
- NFL draft: 2025: undrafted

Career history
- Pittsburgh Steelers (2025)*; Tampa Bay Buccaneers (2025); Pittsburgh Steelers (2025–present)
- * Offseason or practice squad member only

Awards and highlights
- Second-team All-Big Ten (2023); Third-team All-Big Ten (2024)

Career NFL statistics as of 2025
- Total tackles: 3
- Stats at Pro Football Reference

Sebastian Castro (born October 14, 2000) is an American professional football safety for the Pittsburgh Steelers of the National Football League (NFL). He played college football for the Iowa Hawkeyes.

== Early life ==
Castro attended Harold L. Richards High School in Oak Lawn, Illinois. As a senior, he notched 95 total tackles, with 6.5 tackles for loss, and six interceptions. Castro committed to play college football at the University of Iowa, for the Iowa Hawkeyes.

== College career ==
Castro took a redshirt season in 2019. In the 2021 season, he recorded six tackles in four games. In 2022, Castro notched 33 tackles, a sack, five pass deflections, and a pair of forced fumbles. In week two of the 2023 season, he had four tackles and his first career interception, which he returned 30 yards for a touchdown, as helped the Hawkeyes beat rival Iowa State. For his performance, Castro was named the Big Ten Conference defensive player of the week. In week seven, he tallied seven tackles with two going for a loss, a pass deflection, and the game sealing interception, as he helped Iowa beat Wisconsin. For his start to the season, Castro was named a second-team midseason All-American by the Associated Press.

== Professional career ==
Pre-draft measurables
Height	Weight	Arm length	Hand span	Wingspan	40-yard dash	10-yard split	20-yard split	20-yard shuttle	Three-cone drill	Vertical jump	Broad jump	Bench press
5 ft 11 1/4 in (1.81 m)	203 lb (92 kg)	30 3/4 in (0.78 m)	10 1/2 in (0.27 m)	6 ft 2 3/8 in (1.89 m)	4.59 s	1.59 s	2.66 s	4.31 s	7.11 s	32.0 in (0.81 m)	9 ft 9 in (2.97 m)	13 reps
All values from NFL Combine/Pro Day

=== Pittsburgh Steelers (first stint) ===
Castro signed with the Pittsburgh Steelers as an undrafted free agent on April 26, 2025. He was waived on August 26 as part of final roster cuts, and re-signed to the practice squad.

=== Tampa Bay Buccaneers ===
On September 30, 2025, Castro was signed by the Tampa Bay Buccaneers off the Steelers practice squad. He was waived on November 8.

=== Pittsburgh Steelers (second stint) ===
On November 10, 2025, Castro was claimed off waivers by the Steelers.

On August 30, 2026, Castro was waived by the Steelers as a part of final roster cuts; he was re-signed to the team's practice squad the following day.
