= Graziano Origa =

Italian artist (1952–2023)

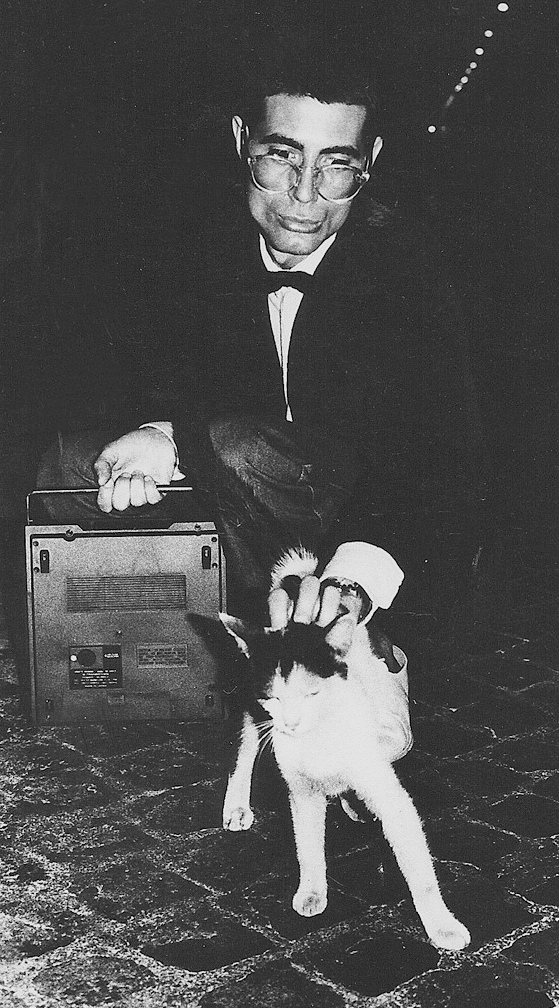
- Origa in 1980
- Born: 22 November 1952 Dolianova, Sardinia, Italy
- Died: 18 June 2023 (aged 70) Quartu Sant'Elena, Sardinia, Italy
- Areas: Author, artist, graphic Designer

Graziano Origa (22 November 1952 – 18 June 2023) was an Italian visual artist. In 1979, he founded the magazine Punk Artist.

== Career ==
Origa was born in the town of Dolianova, Italy, on the island of Sardinia on 22 November 1952.

His work was first published in 1971 in the newspaper L'Unione Sarda. He moved to Milan in 1972, where his art was published in the monthly magazine Scarpantibus. In 1974, he founded Studio Origa to foster and disseminate the talents of rising young artists.

He drew black and white pen/ink portraits of such cultural figures as Elvis Presley, Divine, Krisma, Eva Robin's, Armani, Fiorucci, Cadinot, Sid Vicious, Pasolini, and Andy Warhol.

From 1977 to 1979 he directed the monthly magazine of underground music Gong.

In the 1980s he lived in New York City, making illustrations for the Italian daily newspaper Progresso Italoamericano, also for the gay monthly The Advocate, Torso, Blueboy and the weekly Screw. Origa in Milan became friends with the painter Fernando Carcupino, with him discussed a lot about erotica arts in the tavern "Risotteria".

With his partner photographer, Joe Zattere, he founded fashion magazines such as Punk Artist (1979), Focus (1985), and Fumetti d'Italia (1992).

Origa died on 18 June 2023 at the age of 70.

== Books ==
- Enciclopedia del Fumetto, Ottaviano, due volumi, 1977
- Diary of a Punk Artist, Iride, 1980
- Origa Dessins, Ed. de la Mouette, Francia, 1991
- I mondi di Dylan Dog, Unilito, 1992
- Videomax, Scarabeo, 1994
- Monografia Corrado Roi, Borsa del Fumetto, 1994
- L'Isola dei fumetti, con Bepi Vigna, Scarabeo, 1994
- Magnus: Lo Sconosciuto, Edizioni ReM, 1999
- Magnus: 110 pillole Storyboard, Edizioni ReM, 2000
- Diavolo meridiano, con Giuseppe Pusceddu, Aipsa, 2001
- Edifumetto Index, Edizioni ReM, 2002
- Incredibili Comics!, Edizioni ReM, 2003
- Vietato ai minori, Rizzoli, 2007
