= Huis met de Kabouters =

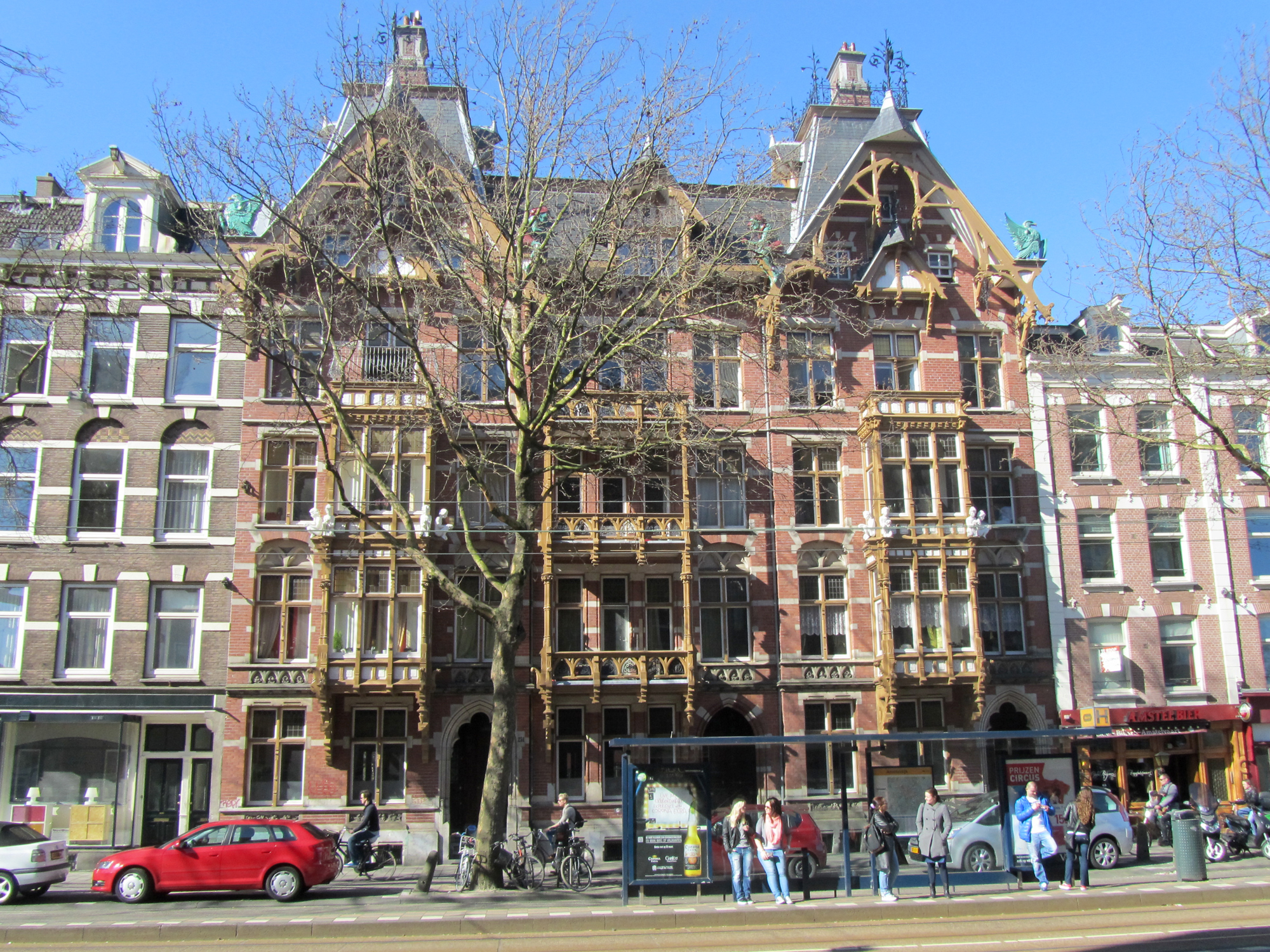
- Facade
- Interactive map of the Huis met de Kabouters area

General information
- Type: Residential building
- Architectural style: Gothic Revival, Renaissance Revival, Swiss chalet style
- Location: Ceintuurbaan 251-255, Amsterdam, Netherlands
- Coordinates: 52°21′21″N 4°54′16″E
- Completed: 1884

Design and construction
- Architect: A.C. Boerma

Website
- huismetdekabouters.nl

The Huis met de Kabouters (Dutch for "House with the Gnomes") is a 19th-century building in Amsterdam, so named because the facade is decorated with two figures of gnomes. The building has held rijksmonument status since 1984.

The house is at Ceintuurbaan 251–255 in the De Pijp district, near the Nieuwe Amstelbrug bridge across the river Amstel. The building is 27 metres in width, 13 metres in depth and 17 metres in height, and consists of three separate houses, each with a ground floor, three residential storeys and an attic storey. The building contains 12 separate apartments, seven of which are rented out and five of which are owned by the residents.

The richly ornate building dates to 1884. It was designed by A.C. Boerma in a mix of architectural styles. The building has Gothic Revival elements such as lancet windows and gargoyles, Renaissance Revival elements such as kruiskozijn windows (with a horizontal and vertical beam dividing them into four sections) and stone blocks, and Swiss chalet style elements such as abundant wood carving.

The facade is made of brick interspersed with sandstone elements, and features three wooden bay windows. The facade is decorated with a variety of ornaments, including gnomes, putti and eagles. The gnomes along the edge of the roof, each measuring two and half metres in height, appear to be tossing a ball back and forth. According to local legend, the ball switches hands from one gnome to the other at midnight daily or, in other versions, only on New Year's Eve or on 29 February in leap years. It is not known what the gnomes are meant to symbolize. According to one explanation, they represent two contractors who worked together on the building. Or they may represent the man who commissioned the building, as his last name was Van Ballegooijen ("Ballegooijen" literally means "ball toss").

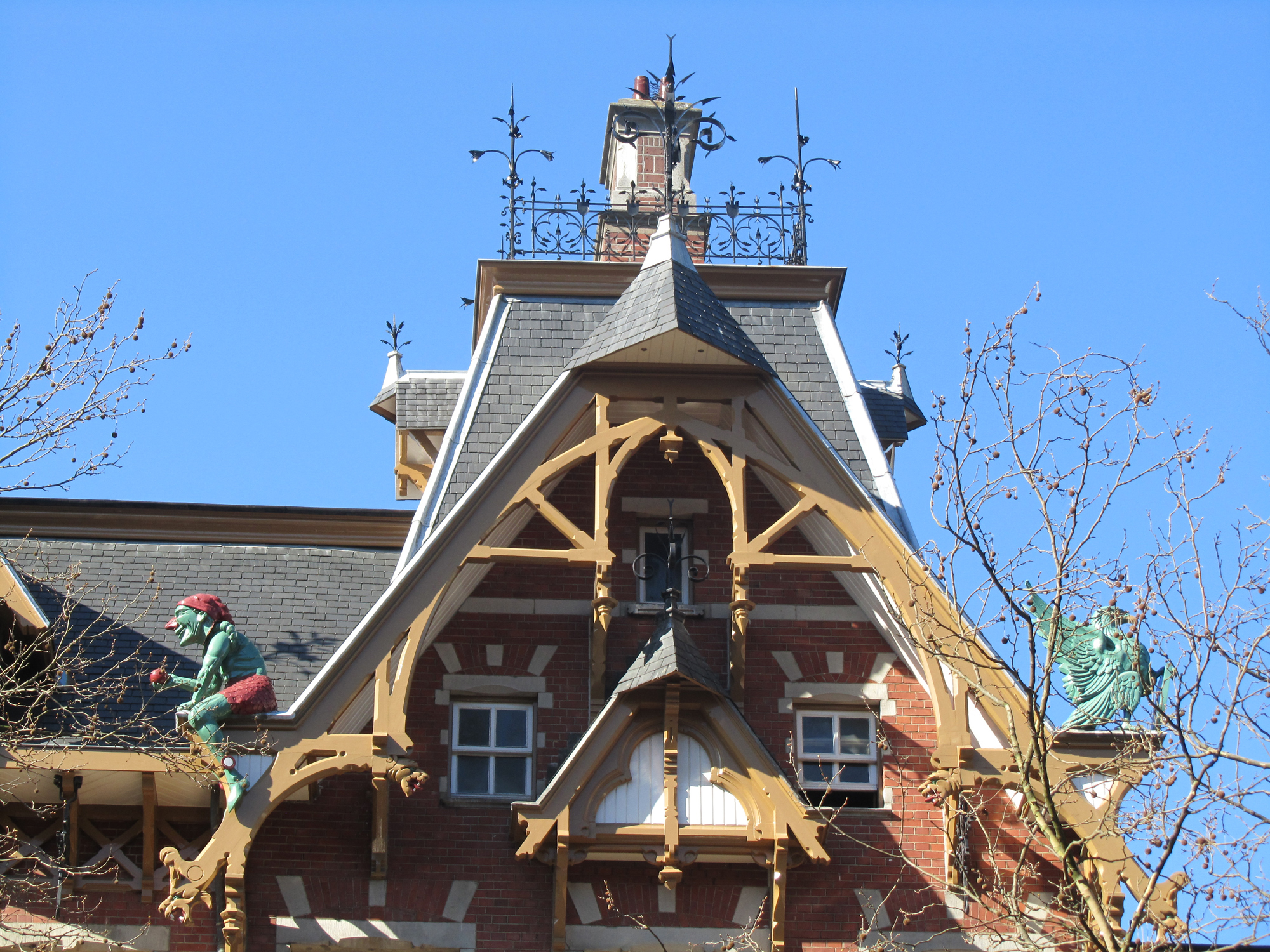
Detail of the roof with one of the gnomes
