= Dolianova =

Dolianova Patiolla
- Comune
- Comune di Dolianova
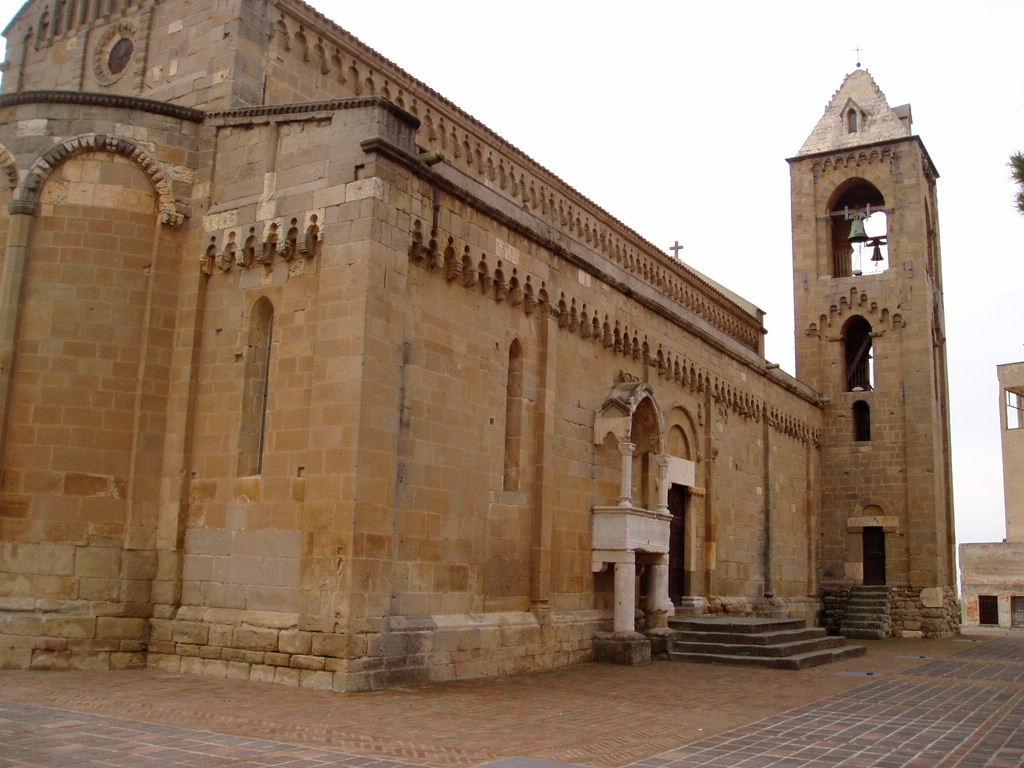
- Church of San Pantaleo

- Coat of arms

- Location within Sardinia
- Coordinates: 39°23′N 09°11′E
- Country: Italy
- Region: Sardinia
- Metropolitan city: Cagliari (CA)

Government
  - Mayor: Ivan Piras

Area
  - Total: 84.60 km^{2} (32.66 sq mi)
- Elevation: 212 m (696 ft)

Population (December 31, 2004)
  - Total: 8,223
  - Density: 97.20/km^{2} (251.7/sq mi)
- Demonym: Dolianovesi
- Time zone: UTC+1 (CET)
  - Summer (DST): UTC+2 (CEST)
- Postal code: 09041
- Dialing code: 070
- Patron saint: San Pantaleo and San Biagio
- Website: Official website

Dolianova (Sardinian: Patiolla) is an Italian town and comune in the Metropolitan City of Cagliari, Sardinia. The town was established on 25 June 1905 from the fusion of two centers: Sicci San Biagio and San Pantaleo. Its economy is based on agriculture (wine and olive oil). The name "Dolianova" has obscure origins. It is thought to be related to the Latin "Pars Olea" (Place of Oil).

== History ==
The first documents about Dolia date to 1089, when the bishop Virgilio signed the act of foundation of the monasteries of Saints Giorgio and Genesio, created by the will of Arzone, judge of Cagliari.

In 1503 the diocese of Dolia was united with the diocese of Cagliari.

At the end of the era of Giudicati, San Pantaleo and Sicci followed different roads: the first one became a fief of Suelli's bishop. Then, the archbishops of Cagliari, become barons, made San Pantaleo the most important centre of the zone, which exercised its power on the villages of Donori, Serdiana, Sicci, Soleminis, and Ussana.

The small village of Sicci San Biagio, during the Aragonese domination, was transformed into a baronage and assigned to Raimondo De Amburra. Sicci thenceforth became a fief of the dukes of Mandas y Tellez Giròn de Alcantara, who maintained it until the end of feudalism. In 1846 San Pantaleo had 1360 inhabitants, Sicci 727.

The two ancient villages of San Pantaleo and Sicci San Biagio, once separated by the great gardens of the villa of Marchioness Boyl of Putifigari (which is now the museum of oil "Sa Mola de su Notariu"), are the two quarters of the modern Dolianova.

=== Ecclesiastical history ===
Titular see of Dolia Doliensis

Location
- Country: Italy
- Territory: Sardinia

Information
- Denomination: Roman Catholic
- Rite: Latin Rite
- Established: 13 March 1969

Current leadership
- Pope: Leo XIV
- Titular bishop: Friedrich Ostermann

Under the name Dolia, Dolianova was the seat of a diocese. It is now the name given to a titular diocese. The diocese was established around the year 1100; the date 1112 can be found, but Benedetto of Dolia was bishop from around 1095, and 1112 is the year of his death. An even earlier date 1089, for bishop Virgilio, is attested.

The diocese was suppressed in 1503, its territory being incorporated in the diocese of Cagliari.

It was revived as a Catholic titular see in 1969. Kevin M. Birmingham was appointed titular bishop in 2020 and remained him until his death.

== Main sights ==
- The Cathedral of San Pantaleo, a Romanesque-Pisane-style church of the 12th century. The works for its construction began in 1160 and finished in 1289. Since the 14th century it has been bishop's seat.
- Roman Baths, in Sa Cora.
- Nuraghe sa dom'e S'Orcu (in Punta Bruncu Salamu)
- The Giant's tombs in Su Tiriaxiu
- The nuragic structures in Sant'Uanni, which fortresses are covered by trees
- The archaeological sites of Mitza salamu e Sa dom' 'e s'ossu.

== Culture ==
The most important events in Dolianova are dedicated to the two saints, which name is related to the ancient villages of San Pantaleo and Sicci San Biagio: the first one is characterized by a procession through the streets with the statue of the saint and a big candle (Su Xeru) transported to Saint Mary's church in Siurgus Donigala as a memory of a vow against the plague.

== Notable residents ==
- Graziano Origa (1952–2023), artist

== See also ==
- Roman Catholic Diocese of Dolia
