= Community High School District 218 =

School district in Illinois, United States

Location
- Illinois. United States

Other information
- Website: www.chsd218.org

The Community High School District 218 is a public high school district with offices in Oak Lawn, Illinois. As of 2017–18, there were 5,405 students enrolled in three high schools and an alternative high school. The district also owns two learning centers. The district's superintendent is Josh Barron.

== Schools and learning centers ==
- Dwight D. Eisenhower High
- Harold L. Richards High School
- Alan B. Shepard High School
- Delta & Summit Learning Center

== Feeder school districts ==
Feeder districts include:

- Ridgeland School District 122
- Oak Lawn-Hometown School District 123
- Atwood Heights School District 125
- Alsip, Hazelgreen, Oak Lawn School District 126
- Worth School District 127
- Chicago Ridge School District 127.5
- Palos Heights District 128
- Cook County School District 130
- Calumet Public School District 132
- Midlothian School District 143
- Posen-Robbins School District 143½
