= Praat =

Open source speech analysis software

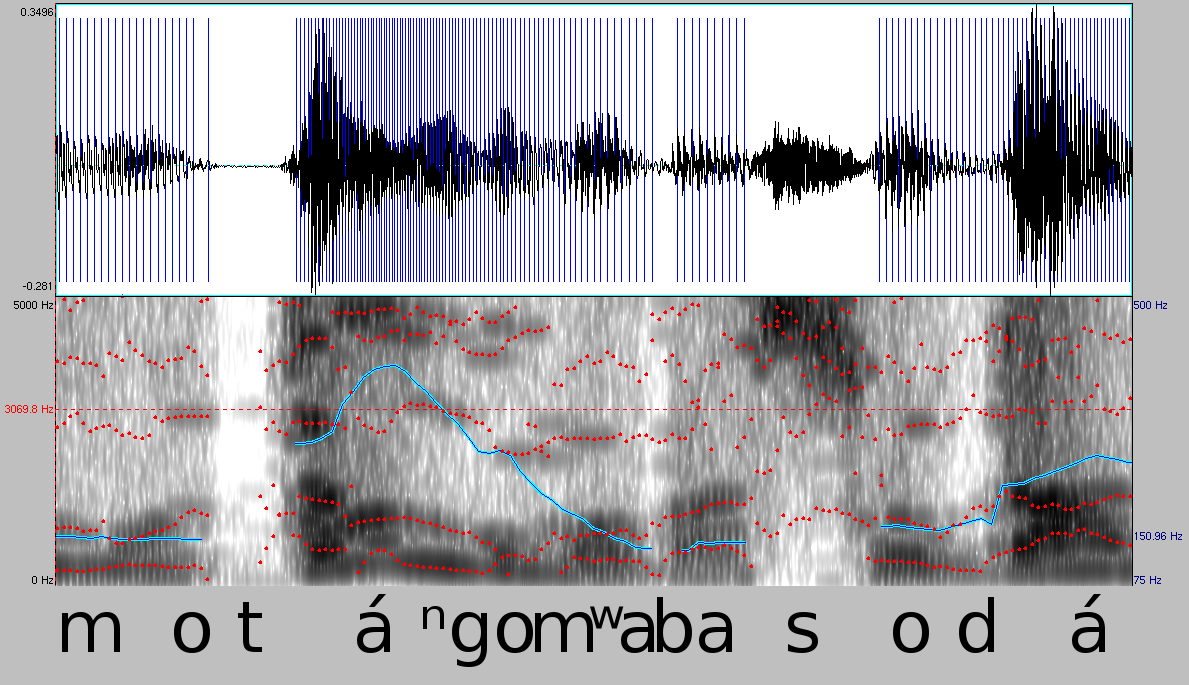
- Spectrogram of Lingala "motángo mwa basodá". Standard Lingala, pronounced by a female speaker. light blue line = pitch dark blue lines = pulses red dots = formants.
- Developers: Paul Boersma and David Weenink
- Release: 1992
- Stable release: 7.0.02 / 27 August 2026; 19 days ago
- Written in: C, C++, Objective-C
- Operating system: Windows, Linux, Macintosh, FreeBSD, Solaris
- Available in: English
- Type: Free software
- License: GPL-3.0-or-later
- Website: www.praat.org
- Repository: github.com/praat/praat

Praat (/prɑːt/ PRAHT; Dutch: [praːt] transl. "Talk") is a free, open-source computer software package widely used for speech analysis and synthesis in phonetics and other fields of linguistics. The software was developed and is maintained by Paul Boersma and David Weenink at the University of Amsterdam, and is compatible with most major operating systems, including Unix, Linux, Mac, and Microsoft Windows. Praat has been used in linguistic research on endangered and minority languages, as well as for analyzing regional accents and phonetic variation.

Praat's main uses are the analysis, manipulation, and synthesis of sounds. With a given sound, Praat allows users to extract information about vowel formants, prosodic details (including intonation and pitch), and visual information via spectrograms and waveforms, which includes voicing, as well as the presence or absence of a particular segment. Users can also annotate sounds and interact with them using the built-in GUI scripting language.

== Version history ==
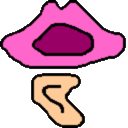
Praat icon until 2020

Version	Date	Main
3.1	5 December 1995	
4.0	15 October 2001	
4.1	5 June 2003	Mac OS X edition, More than 99 percent of the source code distributed under the General Public Licence.
5.0	10 December 2007	
5.1	31 January 2009	
5.2	29 October 2010	
5.3	15 October 2011	
5.4	4 October 2014	
6.0	28 October 2015	
6.1	13 July 2019	
6.2	15 November 2021	
6.3	15 November 2022	
6.4	15 November 2024	
6.6	30 June 2026	
7.0	4 August 2026	
