= Jay W. Boersma =

American photographer and creative director

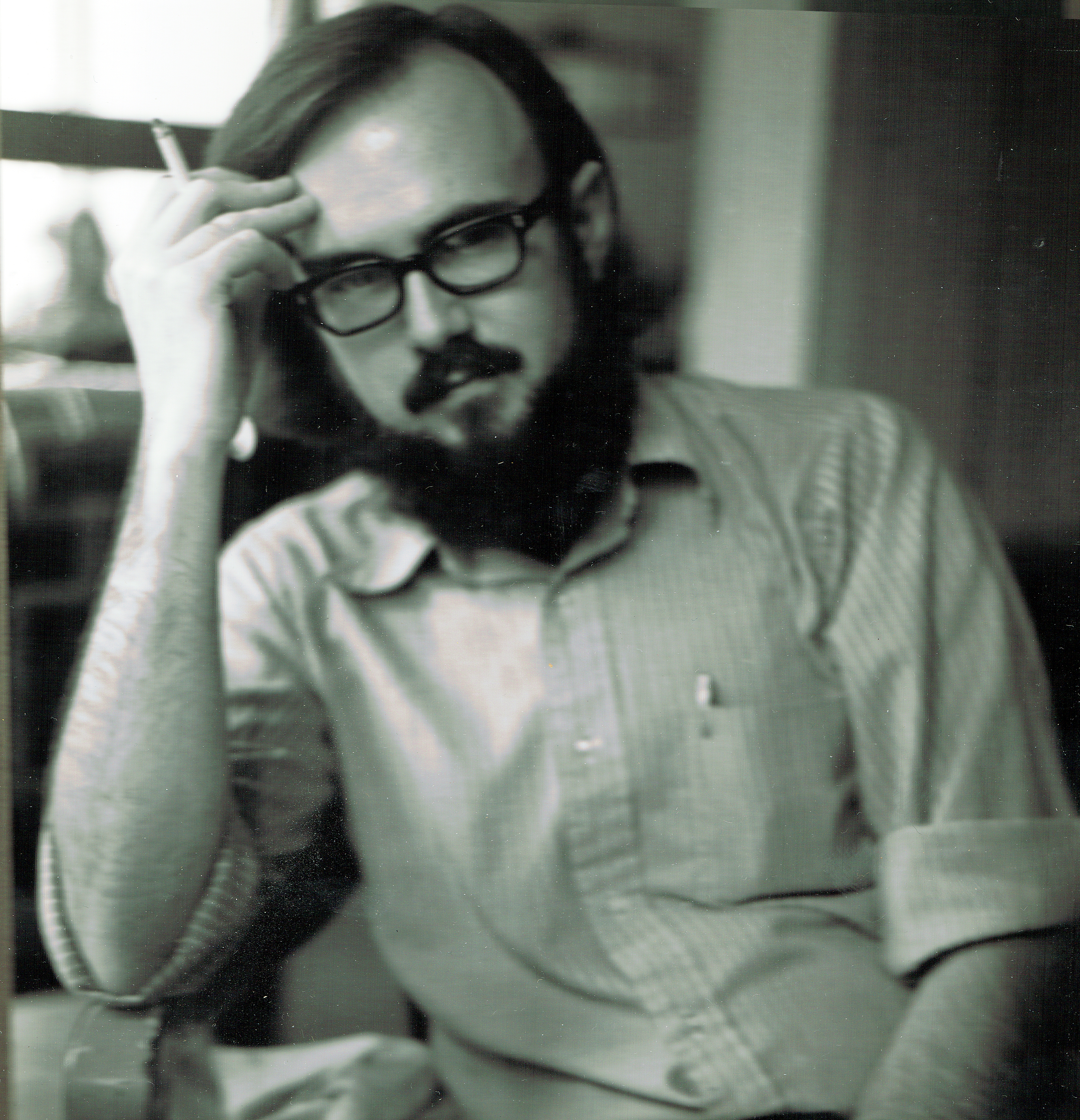
Jay, Chicago 1971 photo: Bruce Edwards

Jay Weaver Boersma (born September 7, 1947) is a fine art and documentary photographer, mixed media artist, designer, and creative director, and was Senior Creative Director at Playboy.com from 1996 to 2011.

He was born in Chicago, graduated in the class of 1965 from Eisenhower High School in Blue Island, Illinois and attended the University of Illinois at Chicago (then the University of Illinois at Chicago Circle). He worked as a Quality Control Technician at the Johnson and Johnson Midwest Surgical Dressing plant in Bedford Park, IL and later as a studio assistant at Shigeta-Wright Photography Studio in Chicago. He graduated with a Bachelor of Arts in 1974 from Columbia College Chicago with a concentration in photography and additional work in ceramics and printmaking. He received a MFA from the Rhode Island School of Design in 1976, after study with such noted photographers as Harry Callahan and Aaron Siskind.

Between 1979 and 1996, he taught photography and art at Bradley University, the University of Illinois at Urbana-Champaign and at Governors State University. He exhibited his work widely during that time and has work in the permanent collections of the Art Institute of Chicago, the Museum of Contemporary Photography in Chicago and several private collections.He is represented by Joseph Bellows Gallery in La Jolla, California.

After two decades of teaching, Boersma became increasingly involved with the Internet and the World Wide Web, which led to his changing careers in 1996 and becoming the Creative Director for Playboy Magazine's web presence, playboy.com.
