= Johannes Sipko Boersma =

Dutch archaeologist

Johannes Sipko Boersma (born 17 June 1935, in Groningen) is a Dutch archaeologist and emeritus professor at the Vrije Universiteit Amsterdam. He was elected a member of the Royal Netherlands Academy of Arts and Sciences in 1986. He obtained his PhD at the University of Groningen in 1970.
