= Cruquiuseiland =

- Neighborhood of Amsterdam
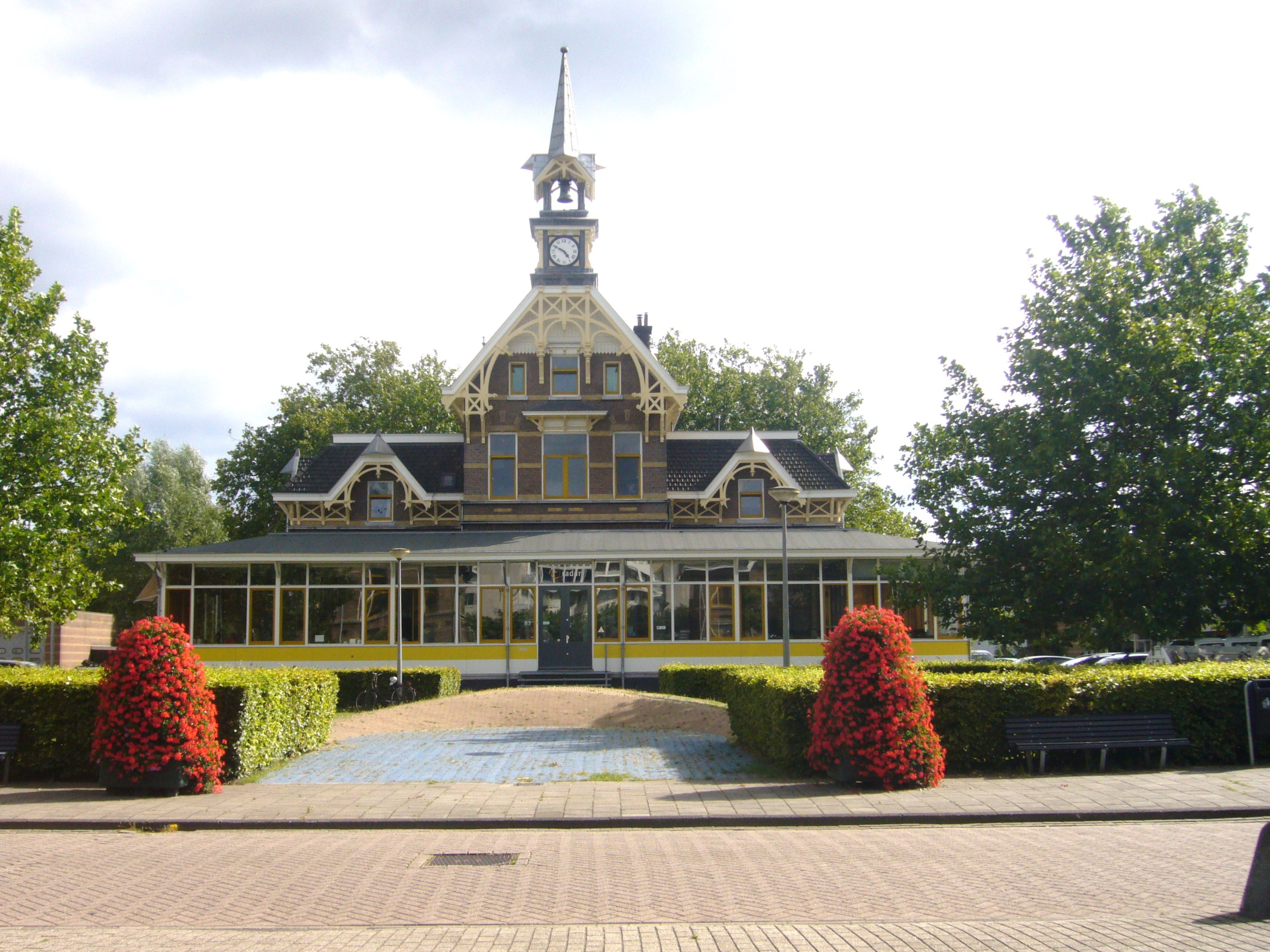
- The Veemarkt
- Interactive map of Cruquiuseiland
- Coordinates: 52°22′37″N 4°56′34″E
- Country: Netherlands
- City: Amsterdam
- Named for: Nicolaas Kruik, commonly known by the Latinized Nicolaus Samuelis Cruquius

Population (2011)
  - Total: 3,586
- Postal code: 1019
- Website: http://www.oost.amsterdam.nl/buurten-0/oostelijk/cruquiuseiland/

Cruquiuseiland (English: Cruquius Island) is a suburb the Eastern Docklands in the Zeeburg district of Amsterdam. The majority of the area is the man-made Cruquius Island itself, although some adjacent land is also part of the area. It is bordered on the north by Borneolaan (between Dirk Vreekenstraat and C. van Eesterenlaan), the west is near bounded by rail, the south by Lozingskanaal and the east by the Rijnkannel.

== History ==
Cruquius Island was built between 1875 and 1925 originally for the expansion of the Port of Amsterdam. Previous to this the area was a swampy wetlands, which was a popular smuggling route into Amsterdam.

The 19th century saw a movement away from private slaughterhouses, and toward public slaughterhouses. To this end, the Veemarkt (Cattle market) was provisioned in Cruquiuseiland. It was designed by the architects A.C. Boerma and E. Damen, and constructed in 1887. There was a marketplace and stables for cows, calves, horses, sheep and pigs. The area also included municipal customs warehouse, Huisje Insulinde (Office of the NV Oliefabrieken Insulinde, built in 1913, now a brewery) and an abattoir which was expanded in 1919. Only eight buildings have been preserved, including the homes of the market manager and the weigher, the canteen building with monumental gate and a police station. The buildings are the oldest building of the Eastern Docklands

== Redevelopment ==
Subsequently, the majority of the area has been converted into residential buildings, although there are many business premises, particularly to the east and to the southwest side. In the late 80s former warehouses along Zeeburgerkade were converted into 390 premium houses. From 2011 through 2030 the Eastern end of Cruquiuseiland is being transformed from an industrial estate to residential area.

The redevelopment is guided by the City of Amsterdam’s phased urban development strategy, which emphasizes gradual transformation while maintaining aspects of the area’s industrial character. Developers have been given flexibility to propose their own building programs, provided they conform to zoning regulations and design quality standards established by the municipality. New housing projects incorporate a mix of rental and owner-occupied units, including social housing. Many of the new buildings include green roofs, energy-efficient systems, and shared communal spaces. The public realm is being redesigned to include waterfront promenades, semi-public gardens, and improved pedestrian and cycling infrastructure.

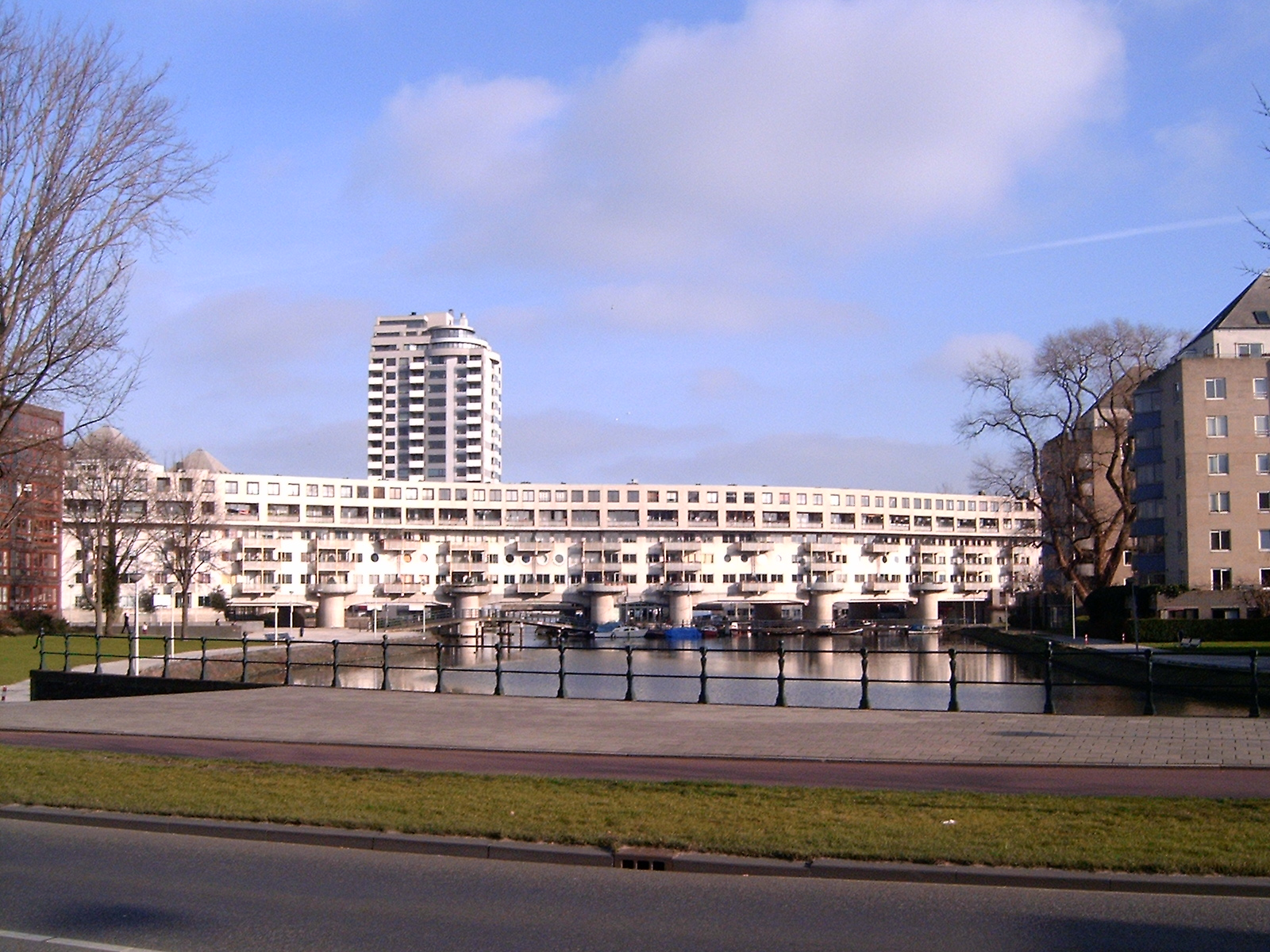
Two modern apartment buildings in Cruquiuseiland: The long winding Entrepotbrug building, with De Watertoren behind

== Museums ==
Cruquiuseiland hosts the Persmuseum ("The Press Museum") and the Museum Perron Oost
