= Dolianova Cathedral =

Church building in Dolianova, Italy

Coordinates: 39.381389°N 9.173889°E

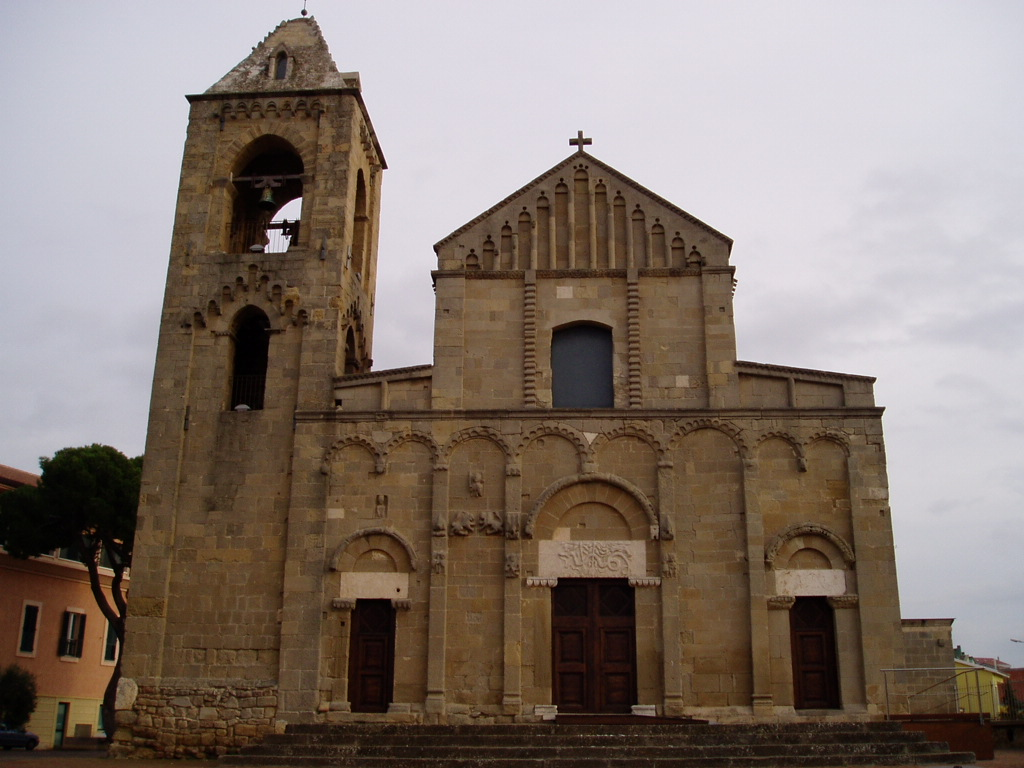
Dolianova Cathedral, west front

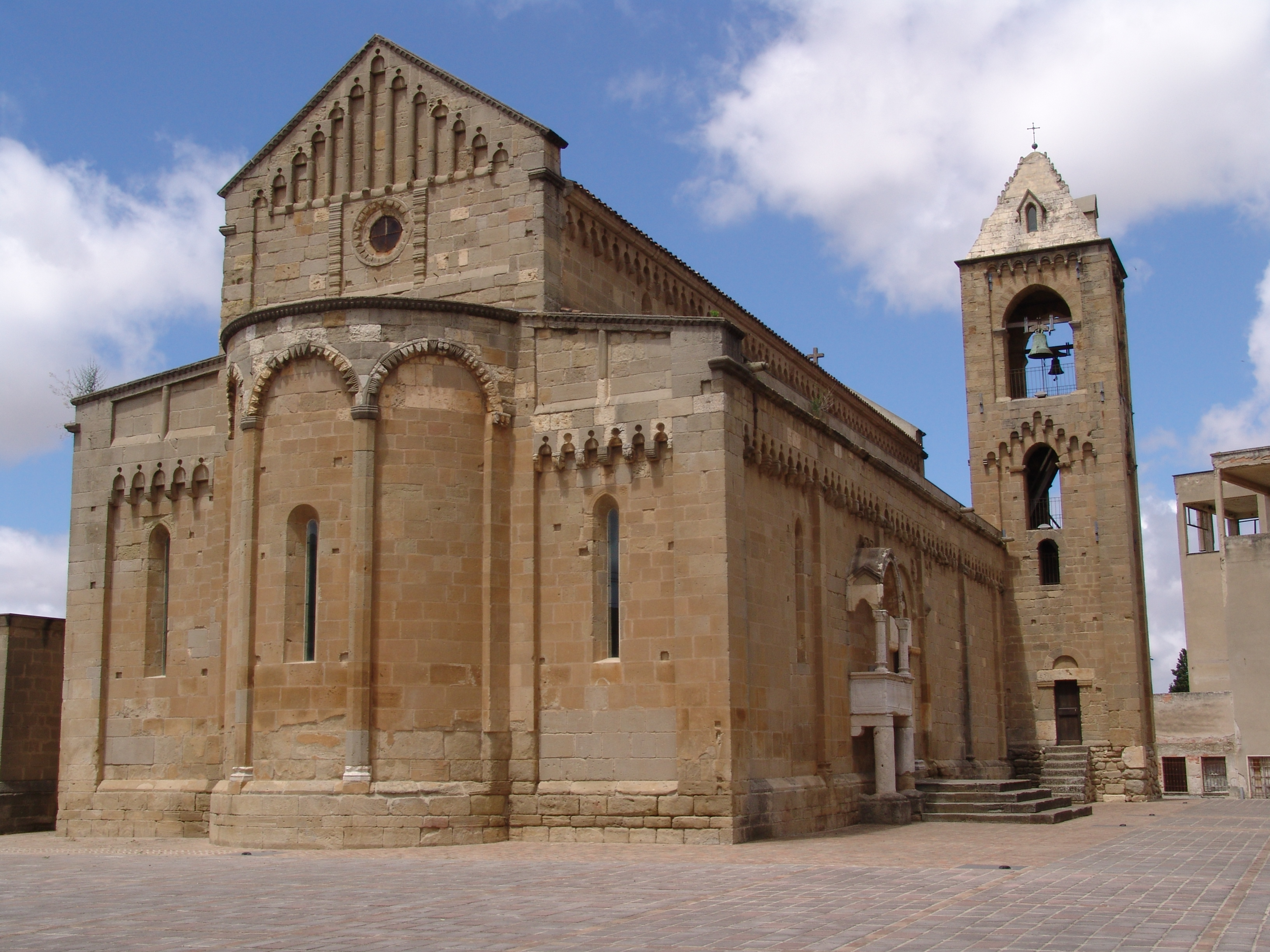
View

Dolianova Cathedral (Italian: Cattedrale di San Pantaleo; Duomo di Dolianova), dedicated to Saint Pantaleon, is a Roman Catholic cathedral church in the historical center of Dolianova, Sardinia, Italy. It is one of the main Romanesque buildings in the island. Formerly the episcopal seat of the diocese of Dolia, it is now a co-cathedral in the Archdiocese of Cagliari.

== History ==
The site of the church has been connected with Christian worship as early as the 6th century, as testified by a Palaeo-Christian baptismal font housed under the church's presbytery. The existence of the diocese of Dolia (the ancient name of Dolianova) is documented from 1089 until 1503, when it was merged into the archdiocese of Cagliari. The cathedral was erected between the 12th and the 13th centuries.

The church is in Pisan-Romanesque style with some Gothic elements (dating to the last construction phase, in the 13th century), and was built of sandstone. The façade, the sides, the apse and the bell tower are decorated with pilasters and Lombard bands featuring numerous different sculptured motifs, such as geometrical patterns, human figures and mythological animals.

The interior has a nave and two aisles, divided by cruciform pilasters, some of them of the Gothic polycolumn type. The sculpted capitals portray New Testament scenes, such as the Nativity and the Adoration of the Magi.

== Sources ==
- Coroneo, Roberto (1993). Architettura Romanica dalla metà del Mille al primo '300. Nuoro: Ilisso. ISBN 88-85098-24-X.
