= Johannes Boersma =

Dutch mathematician

- Born: 5 December 1937; Marrum, Netherlands
- Died: 29 November 2004 (aged 66); Eindhoven, Netherlands
- Education: University of Groningen
- Scientific career
- Fields: Mathematics
- Workplaces: Eindhoven University of Technology
- Doctoral advisor: Adriaan Isak van de Vooren

Johannes Boersma (5 December 1937 Marrum – 29 November 2004 Eindhoven) was a Dutch mathematician who specialized in mathematical analysis. His PhD advisor at the University of Groningen was Adriaan Isak van de Vooren.

== Selected publications ==
- Boersma, J.; Dempsey, J.P. (1992). "On the evaluation of Legendre's chi-function" (PDF). Mathematics of Computation. 59 (199): 157–163. doi:10.2307/2152987. JSTOR 2152987.
