= Paul Boersma =

Dutch professor of phonetic sciences (born 1959)

Paulus Petrus Gerardus "Paul" Boersma (born 15 November 1959, Sint Nicolaasga) is professor of phonetic sciences at the University of Amsterdam. His research and teaching focus on the relationship between phonology and phonetics. Together with David Weenink, he has developed the speech signal processing program Praat, which has become widely used.

Boersma finished a doctoral degree with distinction from the University of Amsterdam with the title Functional Phonology. In 2005, he became a professor of phonetics at the University of Amsterdam. Since February 2022, Boersma has been the director of the Netherlands Graduate School of Linguistics (LOT).
