= Friedrich Ostermann =

German auxiliary bishop

The Most Rev Friedrich Ostermann
- Titular Bishop of Dolia
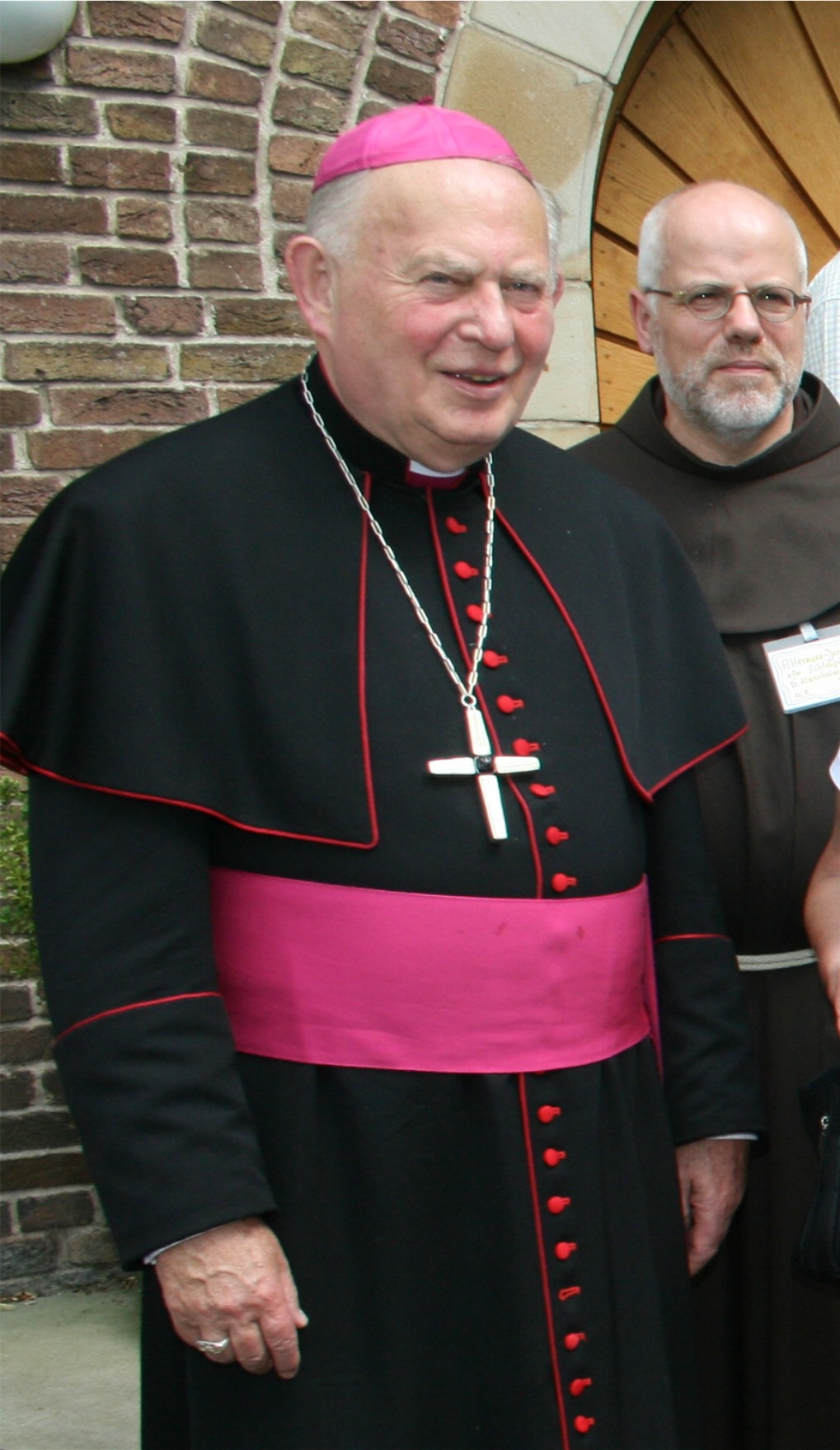
- Friedrich Ostermann on 27 July 2009.
- Appointed: 27 June 1981
- Installed: 13 September 1981
- Predecessor: Lorenzo Unfried Gimpel
- Previous post: Auxiliary Bishop of Münster (27 June 1981 – 18 July 2007)

Orders
- Ordination: 11 February 1958 by Michael Keller
- Consecration: 13 September 1981 by Reinhard Lettmann

Personal details
- Born: 21 June 1932 Münster, Germany
- Died: 22 October 2018 (aged 86) Münster, Germany
- Denomination: Roman Catholic
- Residence: Münster, Germany

Styles of Friedrich Ostermann
- Reference style: The Most Reverend
- Spoken style: Your Excellency
- Religious style: Bishop

Friedrich Ostermann (21 June 1932 – 22 October 2018) was an Auxiliary Bishop of the Roman Catholic Diocese of Münster.

Ostermann was ordained on 11 February 1958. After an initial temporary appointment in Bockum-Hövel he became a Chaplain in Emsdetten, and then a parish priest in Rheine (Sacred Heart) in 1969 and in 1975 a Dean in the Office of the Rhine Deanery.

Pope John Paul II appointed him as Titular Bishop of Dolia and Auxiliary Bishop of Münster (Suffragan Bishop of Warendorf in the diocese of Münster). On 13 September 1981, Ostermann was ordained as a bishop by Bishop Dr. Reinhard Lettmann; co-consecrators were Hermann Josef Spital (Bishop of Trier), and Alfons Demming (Auxiliary Bishop of Münster). In 1981 Ostermann was appointed a Canon Residentiary of Münster Cathedral and Head of the Agency of Missions, Development and Freedom of the Bishops' General Vicarage at Münster. Since 2003 he has been the Dean of the Cathedral of St Paul in Münster.

From 2001 – 2006, Ostermann was the Chairman of the Journalism Commission of the German Bishops' Conference.

On his 75th birthday he tendered his resignation to Pope Benedict XVI on 21 June 2007 which was accepted on 18 July that year.

== Dedication ==
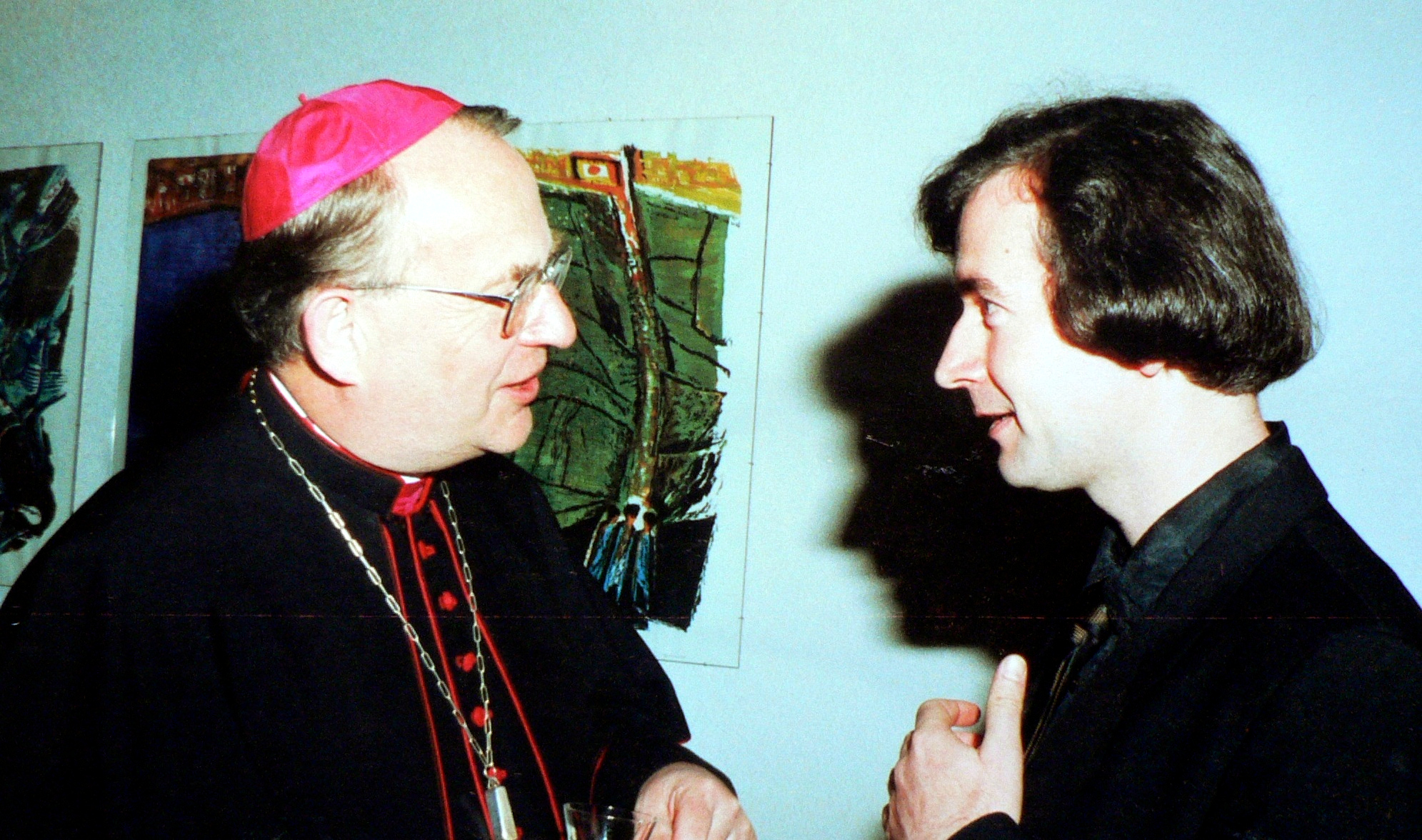
Bishop Ostermann and Ludger Stühlmeyer 1991

„Eure Güte werde allen Menschen bekannt“, for Choir (SATB). Text: Phil 4,5. Melodie and setting: Ludger Stühlmeyer. „Weihbischof Friedrich Ostermann zum diamantenen Priesterjubiläum“. Bishop Friedrich Ostermann for his diamond jubilee on 25 February 2018.

Catholic Church titles
Preceded by Hermann Josef Spital	Auxiliary Bishop of Münster; 1981–2007	Succeeded by Stefan Zekorn
Preceded by Lorenzo Unfried Gimpel	Titular Bishop of Dolia; 1981 – 2018	Succeeded by Vacant
