= Anthonius Cornelis Boerma =

Dutch architect

Anthonius Cornelis Boerma (Note: Also spelled Antonius) (17 August 1852, in Leiden – 26 August 1908, in Ede, Gelderland) was a Dutch architect. Raised in Leiden, he spent most of his life in Amsterdam.

In Amsterdam designed the Huis met de Kabouters, the Lutkie & Smit building on Nieuwendijk, the Bestelhuis van den Boekhandel on Spuistraat, the Café 'De Bisschop' on the corner of the Damrak, and he co-designed the Veemarkt in Cruquiuseiland. He also built many Catholic churches and buildings for institutions, both in Amsterdam and elsewhere in the Netherlands.

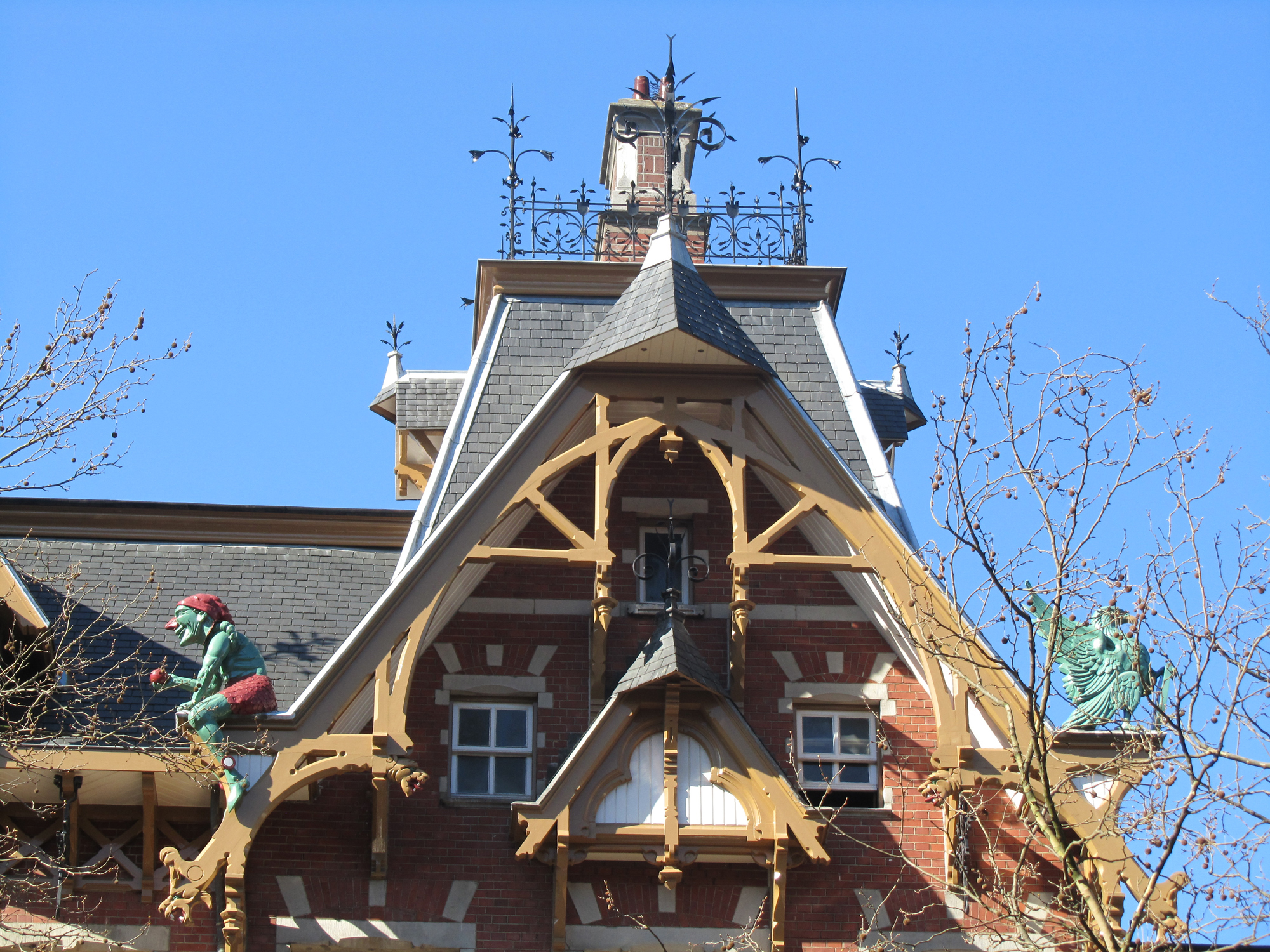
Detail of the roof with one of the gnomes
