= Harold L. Richards High School =

Location
- 10601 S. Central Avenue; Oak Lawn, Illinois 60453; United States; 41°41′59″N 87°45′26″W

Information
- Type: Public
- Motto: "There is Always More To Learn"
- School district: Community H.S. 218
- NCES District ID: 1706540
- Superintendent: Josh Barron
- NCES School ID: 170654000343
- Principal: Dr. MaLinda Majoch
- Teaching staff: 112.80 (FTE)
- Grades: 9–12
- Gender: Co-Ed
- Enrollment: 1,702 (2024–2025)
  - Grade 9: 400 students
  - Grade 10: 436 students
  - Grade 11: 403 students
  - Grade 12: 463 students
- Average class size: 23
- Student to teacher ratio: 15.09
- Campus type: Suburban
- Colors: Gold; Black; White
- Fight song: Oh, Richards High; Finest in the land We're Richards High; Named for the finest man. Let's go, let's fight For colors Gold and White; So hustle on to victory Let's fight team fight! Give it your all, give it your all We will ever fight for you Move it along, move it along, On the ball for Richards High!
- Athletics conference: South Suburban
- Nickname: Bulldogs
- Publication: Reflections
- Newspaper: The Richards Herald
- Yearbook: The Golden Year
- Website: richards.chsd218.org

Harold L. Richards High School is a co-ed public high school in Oak Lawn, Illinois, a suburb of Chicago, and is a member of Illinois School District 218.

The school opened in 1965, named for District Superintendent Dr. Harold Leland Richards who served in that capacity for 33 years from 1935–1968. Dr. Richards served as a private in the army in World War I, as a major in the Army Air Corp in World War II, and eventually rose to Lt. Colonel in the Reserves and called back into active duty during the Korean War. After graduating from Pennsylvania Military College in 1920, he taught in Indiana, was superintendent of Michigamme, Michigan schools, and headed the Iowa Military Academy in Epworth, Iowa before coming to District 218. In addition to PMC, he held multiple degrees from the University of Chicago. Dr. Richards died in January 1988 at the age of 88.

== Demographics ==
The demographic breakdown of the 1,588 students enrolled for the 2020–2021 school year is as follows:

- Male – 52.3%
- Female – 47.7%
- Native American/Alaskan – 0.4%
- Asian/Pacific islander – 2%
- Black – 24.1%
- Hispanic – 25.1%
- White – 45.2%
- Multiracial – 3.6%

== Athletics/Clubs ==
Richards competes in the South Suburban Conference (SSC) and is a member of the Illinois High School Association (IHSA), the body which governs most athletics and competitive activities in the state. Teams are stylized as the Bulldogs. The Athletic Director is Brian Wujcik and the Assistant Athletic Director is Sarah Ficaro.

Fall	Winter	Spring
Cheerleading	Boys' Basketball	Boys' Baseball
Girls' Cross Country	Girls' Basketball	Girls' Softball
Boys' Cross Country	Bowling	Boys' Tennis
Football	Cheerleading	Girls' Soccer
Golf	Goldies	Boys' Track
Girls' Volleyball	Boys' Swimming	Girls' Track
Boys' Soccer	Wrestling	Boys' Volleyball
Girls' Tennis		Girls' Water Polo
Girls' Swimming		Boys' Water Polo

The following Richards teams won or placed top four in their respective state championship tournaments sponsored by the IHSA:

- Basketball (Boys): State Champions (2007–08)
- Basketball (Girls): 4th Place (1985–86)
- Drama: State Champions (2022–23); 2nd Place (2014–15); 3rd Place (1990–91, 2008–09)
- Football: State Champions (1988–89, 1989–90); 2nd Place (2001–02, 2013–14)
- Softball: 2nd Place (1983–84)
- Track (Girls): 3rd Place (1972–73)
- Volleyball (Boys): State Champions (1991–92)
- Volleyball (Girls): State Champions (1986–87)
- Wrestling: State Champions (1974–75, 1976–77); 2nd Place (1975–76); 3rd Place (1977–78)

== Notable alumni ==
- Sebastian Castro, defensive back for the Iowa Hawkeyes
- John Cox, Republican 2008 presidential candidate and 2018 California gubernatorial candidate.
- Dave Dombrowski, President of Baseball Operations for the Philadelphia Phillies
- Dwayne Goodrich, former defensive back of the Dallas Cowboys
- Mike Jones, former offensive lineman of the Chicago Bears
- John Kass, Chicago Tribune columnist
- Sean Lewis, college football coach
- Joe Montgomery, former NFL football player for the New York Giants
- Dwyane Wade, former NBA player for the Miami Heat, co-owner of the Utah Jazz, 3× champion, Olympic gold medalist, and Hall of Famer
