= Adee =

Adee is both a surname and a given name. Notable people with the name include:

- Alvey A. Adee (1842–1924), American diplomat
- Bill Adee (born 1960s), American journalist
- George Adee (1874–1948), American football player and tennis official
- Adee Dodge (1912–1992), Navajo artist, linguist, and Navajo code talker
- Adee Suhardee Muhidin (born 1979), Bruneian footballer
