= Palos Park, Illinois =

- Village
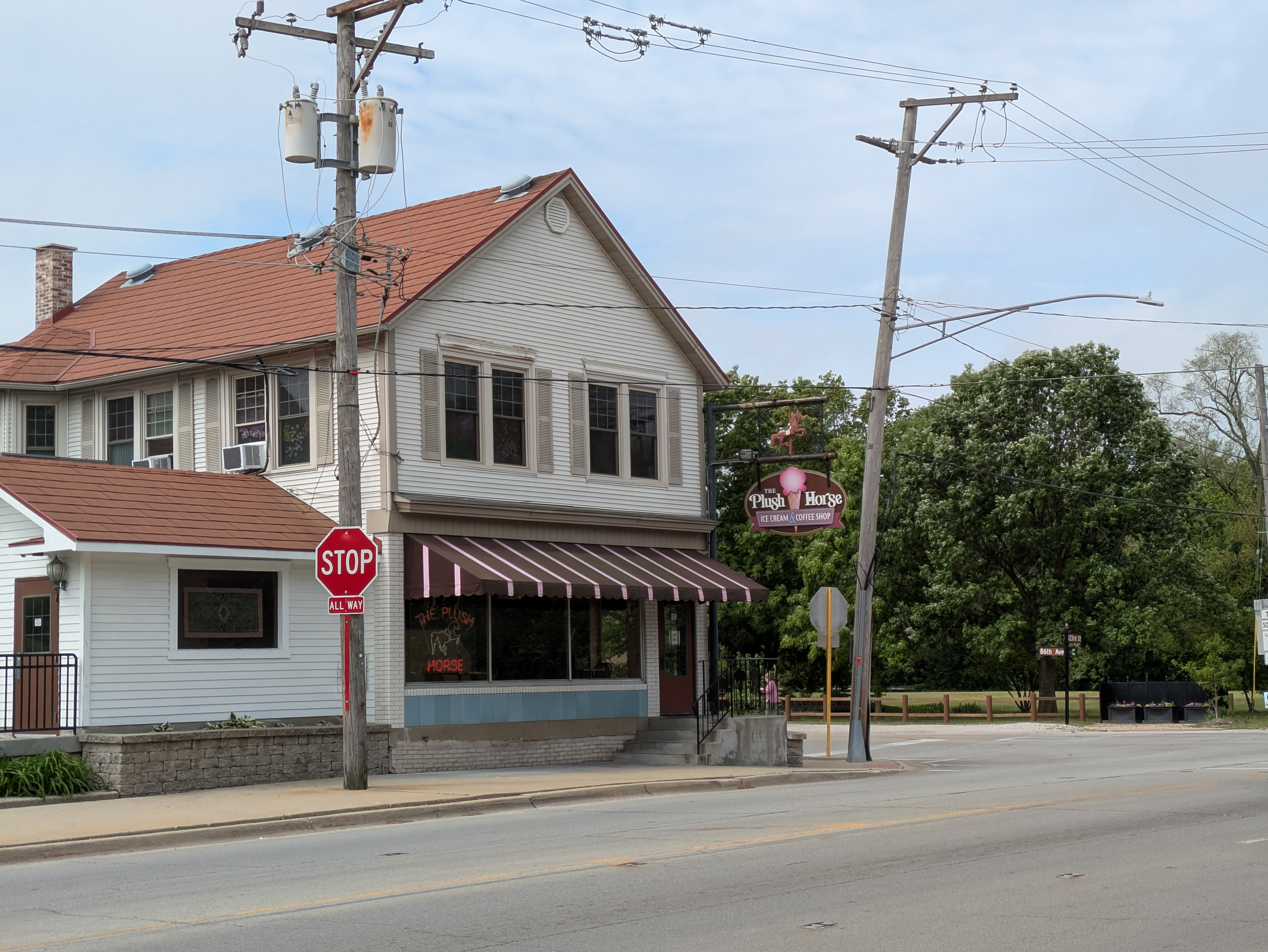
- Plush Horse ice cream shop

- Seal

- Location of Palos Park in Cook County, Illinois.

- Location within Greater Chicago Location within Illinois Location within the United States
- Coordinates: 41°39′56″N 87°50′12″W
- Country: United States
- State: Illinois
- County: Cook
- Township: Palos, Lemont
- Incorporated: 1914

Government
  - Type: Commission
  - Mayor: Nicole Milovich-Walters
  - Other Commissioners: G. Darryl Reed; Rebecca Petans; Dan Polk; Mike Wade

Area
  - Total: 6.57 sq mi (17.02 km^{2})
  - Land: 6.45 sq mi (16.70 km^{2})
  - Water: 0.12 sq mi (0.31 km^{2}) 1.01%

Population (2020)
  - Total: 4,899
  - Density: 759.7/sq mi (293.31/km^{2})

Standard of living
  - Median home value: $431,600
- ZIP code(s): 60464, 60465
- Area code(s): 708
- Geocode: 57407
- FIPS code: 17-57407
- Website: www.palospark.org

Palos Park is a village in southwestern Cook County, Illinois, United States. Per the 2020 census, the population was 4,899.

== Geography ==
Palos Park is located at 41°39′56″N 87°50′12″W (41.665682, -87.836633).

According to the 2021 census gazetteer files, Palos Park has a total area of 6.57 square miles (17.02 km^{2}), of which 6.45 square miles (16.71 km^{2}) (or 98.16%) is land and 0.12 square miles (0.31 km^{2}) (or 1.84%) is water.

== Demographics ==
Historical population
Census	Pop.	Note	%±
1920	240		—
1930	456		90.0%
1940	596		30.7%
1950	854		43.3%
1960	2,169		154.0%
1970	3,297		52.0%
1980	3,150		−4.5%
1990	4,199		33.3%
2000	4,689		11.7%
2010	4,847		3.4%
2020	4,899		1.1%
U.S. Decennial Census; 2010 2020

=== Racial and ethnic composition ===
Palos Park village, Illinois – Racial and ethnic composition Note: the US Census treats Hispanic/Latino as an ethnic category. This table excludes Latinos from the racial categories and assigns them to a separate category. Hispanics/Latinos may be of any race.
Race / Ethnicity (NH = Non-Hispanic)	Pop 2000	Pop 2010	Pop 2020	% 2000	% 2010	% 2020
White alone (NH)	4,466	4,468	4,247	95.24%	92.18%	86.69%
Black or African American alone (NH)	12	36	69	0.26%	0.74%	1.41%
Native American or Alaska Native alone (NH)	2	3	0	0.04%	0.06%	0.00%
Asian alone (NH)	81	82	102	1.73%	1.69%	2.08%
Pacific Islander alone (NH)	0	0	0	0.00%	0.00%	0.00%
Other race alone (NH)	5	6	23	0.11%	0.12%	0.47%
Mixed race or Multiracial (NH)	24	53	112	0.51%	1.09%	2.29%
Hispanic or Latino (any race)	99	199	346	2.11%	4.11%	7.06%
Total	4,689	4,847	4,899	100.00%	100.00%	100.00%

=== 2020 census ===
As of the 2020 census, Palos Park had a population of 4,899. The median age was 54.6 years. 16.2% of residents were under the age of 18 and 32.5% of residents were 65 years of age or older. For every 100 females there were 87.3 males, and for every 100 females age 18 and over there were 86.8 males age 18 and over.

99.8% of residents lived in urban areas, while 0.2% lived in rural areas.

There were 1,900 households in Palos Park, of which 22.7% had children under the age of 18 living in them. Of all households, 60.3% were married-couple households, 12.8% were households with a male householder and no spouse or partner present, and 22.5% were households with a female householder and no spouse or partner present. About 26.0% of all households were made up of individuals and 19.1% had someone living alone who was 65 years of age or older.

There were 2,023 housing units, of which 6.1% were vacant. The homeowner vacancy rate was 1.9% and the rental vacancy rate was 5.6%. The population density was 746.12 inhabitants per square mile (288.08/km^{2}). Housing density was 308.10 per square mile (118.96/km^{2}).

=== Income and poverty ===
The median income for a household in the village was $114,020, and the median income for a family was $135,625. Males had a median income of $101,420 versus $35,625 for females. The per capita income for the village was $63,500. About 0.7% of families and 3.1% of the population were below the poverty line, including 0.0% of those under age 18 and 6.5% of those age 65 or over.

== Government ==
The Village Council is composed of Nicole Milovich-Walters (Mayor), G. Darryl Reed (Commissioner of Accounts & Finances), Rebecca Petan (Commissioner of Streets & Public Improvements), Dan Polk (Commissioner of Police and Public Safety), and Mike Wade (Commissioner of Building and Public Property). Marie Arrigoni is the elected Clerk.

At the federal level, Palos Park is in the Illinois 6th congressional district. At the state level, it is divided among the 14th, 18th, and 41st Illinois Senate districts and the 26th, 35th, and 82nd Illinois House districts.

== Education ==
Residents in eastern portions are in Palos School District 118:

- Palos South Middle School
- Palos East Elementary School (in Palos Heights)
- Palos West Elementary School

High school students in eastern portions are served by Consolidated High School District 230's Amos Alonzo Stagg High School.

Southwest Suburban Montessori School is located in Palos Park.

Palos Park Public Library was founded in 1936 and has been part of the village government since 1945.

== Transportation ==
Palos Park has a station on Metra's SouthWest Service, which provides rail service to Chicago's Union Station on weekdays and Saturdays. Pace provides bus service on Route 379 connecting Palos Park to destinations across the Southland.

== Notable people ==
- Jane M. Barnes, Illinois state politician
- Sean M. Morrison, Cook County commissioner and chair of the Cook County Republican Party
- Zay N. Smith, columnist and author known for his work at the Chicago Sun-Times including the Mirage investigative series in 1978 and the QT column which ran from 1995 to 2008. Smith was raised in Palos Park.
