= Art Petacque =

American journalist

Art Petacque (July 20, 1924 – June 6, 2001) was a Chicago newspaper reporter for the Chicago Sun-Times who won the Pulitzer Prize in 1974. Petacque, who specialized in writing about crime and in particular about the Chicago Outfit shared the 1974 Pulitzer Prize for Local General or Spot News Reporting with his Chicago Sun-Times colleague, Hugh Hough. During the later part of his career, Petacque also worked concurrently as a commentator for WLS-TV in Chicago.

== Early life and education ==
Raised on the Northwest Side of Chicago, Petacque was the son of a well-known Chicago police captain. He graduated from Chicago's Austin High School in 1942.

== Career ==
Petacque began working as a copy boy in 1942 for the Chicago Sun, which was one of the predecessor newspapers to the Chicago Sun-Times. He was with the Sun-Times from its inception in 1948 until retiring in 1991.

From early in his career, Petacque covered the crime beat. He became an investigative reporter in 1957 and a columnist with Hough in 1974.

In 1974, Petacque and Hough won the Pulitzer Prize for their work in uncovering new information about the murder of Valerie Percy, the daughter of U.S. Sen. Charles H. Percy. She had been murdered in their family home in Kenilworth, Illinois, in 1966 during his senatorial campaign. Although the murder was never solved, Petacque and Hough's work prompted police to reopen a probe into the death.

Petacque often wrote about the mobsters of his day, including Joseph Ferriola, Sam Carlisi, Joey Aiuppa, Joseph Andriacchi, Jackie Cerone and Tony Accardo.

Petacque also worked for Chicago's WLS-TV as a commentator on the station's afternoon newscasts, and won a local Emmy in 1984.

After Petacque's death, Sun-Times reporter Neil Steinberg remembered him as "a colorful presence from a vanished age, with wild, unkempt eyebrows and a soggy cigar, drawing scraps of paper and matchbooks out of his pockets, reading notes on the doings of mobsters and madams...Art Petacque was a police captain when he needed to be a police captain, and a doctor when he needed to be a doctor. He could be a burglar, too, if necessary, slipping into a basement window to snatch a photo for a story."

Petacque retired from the Sun-Times in September 1991. The paper's editor at the time, Dennis Britton, told the Chicago Reader after Petacque's death that "I had problems with some of the ways Art pursued his job."

== Death ==
Petacque died on June 6, 2001, after suffering a heart attack.
