= Mirage Tavern =

Coordinates: 41.895600°N 87.634119°W

Brehon Pub
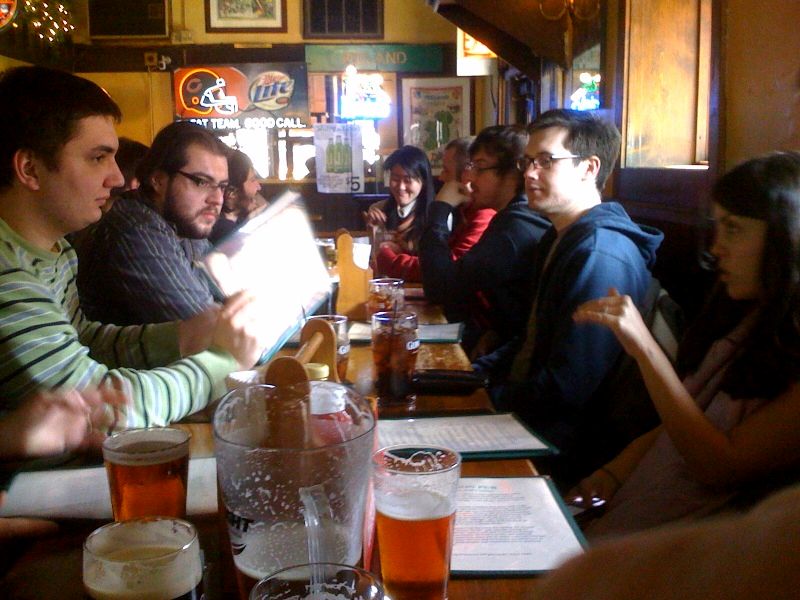
- Customers in 2009
- Interactive map of Brehon Pub

Restaurant information
- Established: 1977
- Location: Chicago, Illinois
- Other information: Sold and later renamed to Brehon Pub.

The Mirage Tavern was a drinking establishment at 731 N. Wells St. in Chicago purchased by the watchdog group Better Government Association and the Chicago Sun-Times in 1977 to investigate widespread allegations of official corruption and shakedowns visited on small businesses by city officials. The journalists used hidden cameras to help ensure that city inspectors caught accepting payoffs for ignoring safety hazards were all properly documented.

The tavern, which has had more than one owner since the Sun-Times investigation, is now known, after a number of improvements, as the Brehon Pub.

== Mirage Tavern investigation ==
The project was overseen by editors James Hoge, Ralph Otwell, Stuart H. Loory and Joseph Reilly. In May 1977, journalist Pam Zekman and Better Government Association chief investigator Bill Recktenwald purchased the tavern under the aliases Mr. and Mrs. Ray Patterson. Reporter Zay N. Smith, who wrote the series, and BGA investigator Jeff Allen posed as the bartender and manager, respectively. Sun-Times photographers Gene Pesek and Jim Frost posed as repairmen and were in charge of photographing the tavern's activities from a hidden section of the tavern built over the washrooms.

Corrupt practices ran the gamut from shakedowns to tax fraud. The shakedown amounts were small, typically less than $100, as the reporters learned of what they later called "the supermarket approach to graft--low prices, high volume" that inspectors tended to prefer as the safest way of doing illegal business.

Among others, a city electrical inspector agreed to overlook the tavern's faulty wiring. A fire department lieutenant agreed to sign off on the tavern's grand opening, despite the loose electrical wiring hanging from rafters and a basement piled high with trash against regulations. A city health inspector ignored maggots and sink drains that emptied down to the basement floor. A state liquor inspector ignored fruit flies in the liquor. (The tavern quietly corrected all its code violations, on its own, after the shakedown inspections.)

Also reported were illegal kickbacks from pinball operators and jukebox operators (A.A. Swingtime Music Company), as well as tax skimming. Philip J. Barasch, a local accountant, gave the new owners of the bar extensive lessons on how to keep two sets of account books to skim profits without paying tax and advised them exactly what time of day inspectors showed up and how much their shakedowns would typically cost. He also suggested including his business card with any payoffs to help smooth the shakedown process. The only officials he warned against bribing were the police, noting that "if you pay off a cop, they keep coming around every month, like flies, looking for a payoff". The Mirage, after hearing Barasch's tax advice, hired six more accountants specializing in small cash businesses and was counseled by all of them to commit fraud.

In 1978, the Sun-Times and BGA broke the story in a 25-part series that documented the many abuses and crimes committed at the tavern, which was shaken down repeatedly by state and local officials. The series was initially nominated for the Pulitzer Prize for general reporting, but the Pulitzer board decided not to award the Sun-Times/BGA collaboration after editor Ben Bradlee of the Washington Post led an attack on the grounds the reporters used undercover reporting, a form of deception, to report the story.

The Mirage gave rise to major reforms including city code revisions, new procedures in city inspections and investigations at federal, state and city levels. The IRS sent in 20 agents to take a closer look at tax fraud by cash businesses. The Illinois Department of Revenue formed a new investigative unit: the Mirage Audit Unit. An ongoing federal investigation, spurred by the Mirage findings, managed indictments of a third of the city’s electrical inspectors in 1978, with more indictments to come later.
