= Zay N. Smith =

American journalist (1949–2020)

Zay N. Smith (May 1, 1949 – May 11, 2020) was a columnist and author known for his work at the Chicago Sun-Times. He wrote a popular column from 1995 to 2008 called QT, which was a mixture of humor and comment.

== Early life and education ==
Born Zay Nockton Smith, Smith grew up in Palos Park, Illinois, the son of an English teacher mother and a father who was an airline pilot turned architect and designer. Smith was a graduate of Lawrence University, did postgraduate work at the University of Iowa and taught at Northwestern University.

== Professional career ==
Smith's first newspaper job was with the Worth-Palos Reporter.

Smith later joined the Chicago Sun-Times. In 1977, he was a member of a team of investigative reporters who participated in a newspaper-directed undercover purchase of a Chicago dive bar. The Sun-Times bought the bar and ran it undercover for four months to document payoffs and graft. Smith himself "worked" in the bar, under the pseudonym Norty the Bartender. The 25-part series was published starting in January 1978. Smith wrote every story in the series and then wrote a book, titled "The Mirage." The series was a finalist for the Pulitzer Prize, but did not win because the Pulitzer Prizes' board objected to the Sun-Times' use of undercover techniques.

Smith started writing the QT column in 1995. He continued writing the column online after leaving the Sun-Times in 2008.

He published his column on the Internet at ZaySmith.com.

Smith's column had many running features, which include the following:

- We Have Seen the Present, and It Does Not Work
- The Not Me Decade, in which everybody else is responsible for everything
- Modern Education + the Criminal Mind =
- QT Abridged Too Far Dictionary of the English Language
- Lest We Forget that the Dark Ages Were a Faith-Based Initiative
- QT Trickle-On Economics Update
- The Case for the San Andreas Fault
- QT Modern Corporate Gibberish of the Week
- The Case for Zero Tolerance of Modern School Administrators
- QT Grammar R Us Seminar on the English Language

Smith's column also featured a running gag in which readers report how many search engine hits they can find for the phrase "tap-dancing militant Islamic fundamentalists" (or some similar variation). The Los Angeles Times once referred to Smith as "our favorite Chicago columnist since Mike Royko."

Reader contributions play a significant role in QT's content. One frequent contributor topic is punned variations on current headlines or movie titles; the best (or worst) are rewarded with the admonition "Stop it. Stop it now".

Before starting the QT column, Smith worked as an investigative reporter on stories ranging from laetrile smuggling to religious cults, as a foreign correspondent on such stories as the pilgrimages of Pope John Paul II to Poland and as a writer of major features. He played a key role in the 1978 Mirage Tavern investigation, in which undercover reporters operated a bar on Chicago's Near North Side while hidden photographers took pictures of city officials accepting bribes.

== Death ==
Smith died of lung cancer on May 11, 2020.

== Personal life ==
He was the father of two sons, Bryant and Zachary.
