= James C. Tyree =

- Born: October 30, 1957
- Died: March 16, 2011 (aged 53)
- Education: Illinois State University
- Employer: Mesirow Financial
- Known for: Chicago Sun-Times acquisition
- Title: Chief Executive Officer
- Spouse: Eve Tyree

James C. Tyree (October 30, 1957 – March 16, 2011) was a Chicago financier who was chairman and chief executive officer of Mesirow Financial since 1994. In 2009, he led a team of investors that took control of the Chicago Sun-Times newspaper, which he owned until his death.

== Early life and education ==
Tyree grew up in the Beverly neighborhood on Chicago's South Side. He graduated from Marist High School in 1975.

Tyree earned his bachelor's and MBA degrees from Illinois State University in 1978 and 1980, respectively.

== Professional career ==
In 1980, Tyree joined Mesirow Financial fresh out of business school as a research analyst. In 1990, he became the firm's president, and in 1994, he became the firm's chairman and chief executive officer.

From 1990 until his death, Tyree oversaw 50 acquisitions by Mesirow.

== Bid for the Sun-Times ==
In September 2009, Tyree and a group of investors he was leading placed a $5 million bid, which was accepted to purchase the Chicago Sun-Times newspaper and its bankrupt company, Sun-Times Media Group Inc. As part of their offer, Tyree and his group also had agreed to assume $20 million in liabilities.

== Personal ==
Tyree married his second wife, Eve, in 1996, after a first marriage had ended in divorce. Eve had been Mesirow's chief financial officer. They owned a mansion on Chicago's Gold Coast and a lakefront summer house in Long Beach, Indiana. They also had children, a daughter and two sons: Jessica, Joseph and Matthew.

Tyree had type 1 diabetes.

On October 20, 2010, his diagnosis with stomach cancer was revealed. On March 16, 2011, Tyree died of unexplained complications.
