= Pam Zekman =

American journalist (born 1944)

Pam Zekman (born October 22, 1944, in Chicago) is an American journalist who had been an investigative reporter at WBBM-TV in Chicago from 1981 to 2020. A graduate of the University of California, Berkeley, Zekman spent over a decade as a newspaper reporter before working in television. Zekman is known for her aggressive investigative work, including the purchase of the Mirage Tavern. She has shared two Pulitzer Prizes for her reporting for the Chicago Tribune (1971–76) and the Chicago Sun-Times (1976–81).

As a young woman, Zekman was also a competitive figure skater, finishing fifth in junior ladies singles at the 1961 United States Figure Skating Championships.

Zekman, along with fellow WBBM personalities, police reporter John Drummond, chief correspondent Jay Levine, and then evening anchor/reporter Lester Holt appeared in the final scenes of the 1993 film The Fugitive, playing themselves. She, along with Drummond, also appeared in the 1996 film Chain Reaction.

Zekman was sued for defamation and libel by the chief toxicologist of the Cook County medical examiner's office after reporting the office was mishandling cases. The case was dismissed on both counts.

Zekman began working at WBBM in 1981, and in that time she has investigated Medicare fraud, dangerous cab and bus drivers, tax fraud, and government waste, among many other things. Zekman was laid off on May 27, 2020.

== Personal life ==
Zekman has been married twice. Her first husband was U.S. district judge James Zagel. The couple divorced in 1975. Her second husband, former Chicago newspaperman Rick Soll, died on April 22, 2016.

Zekman's father, Theodore N. Zekman, was a Chicago ophthalmologist.
