= Jane M. Barnes =

American politician

Jane M. Barnes (née Crowley) (January 4, 1928 – May 11, 2000) was an American politician.

Born in Chicago, Illinois, Barnes went to Notre Dame High School and Saint Xavier University. She lived in Palos Park, Illinois, and was involved with the Republican Party. From 1975 to 1993, Barnes served in the Illinois House of Representatives. Barnes died from cancer at her home in Palos Park, Illinois.
