= School District 118 =

School District 118 may refer to:

- Belleville School District 118
- Danville School District No. 118
- Palos School District 118
- Wauconda School District 118
