= Hugh Hough =

American journalist

- Born: April 15, 1924; Sandwich, Illinois, USA
- Died: April 18, 1986 (aged 62)
- Education: 1951, University of Illinois School of Journalism
- Occupation: Journalist
- Spouse: Ellen Marie Wasemann (m. 1948)
- Children: 4
- Awards: Pulitzer Prize for Breaking News Reporting

Hugh Frederick Hough (April 15, 1924 – April 18, 1986) was an American author. He received the Pulitzer Prize for Breaking News Reporting with Art Petacque for uncovering new evidence that led to the reopening of efforts to solve the 1966 murder of Valerie Percy.

== Early life and education ==
Hough was born in Sandwich, Illinois on April 15, 1924, to parents Forrest and Lila Hough. He attended the University of Illinois School of Journalism for his Bachelor of Arts degree. He met his future wife Ellen Marie Wasemann while at the University of Illinois and during the War she worked as a Junior Clerk-Typist in the university's Library School office.

== Career ==
Once World War II broke, Hough joined the United States Air Force from 1943 to 1945. He served in the 465th Bombardment Group as a staff sergeant.

Upon returning, Hough joined the staff at the Chicago Sun-Times in 1952, after working as a sports editor at the Dixon Evening Telegraph. In 1974, his reporting with Art Petacque uncovered new evidence that led to the reopening of the 1966 murder of Valerie Percy, earning them the Pulitzer Prize for Breaking News Reporting.

He eventually died on April 18, 1986, due to illness. Upon his death, the University of Illinois created a scholarship fund in his name for students enrolled in their College of Communications.
