= Bill Adee =

American journalist

Bill Adee is Chief Operating Officer for Vegas Stats and Information Network (VSiN) after joining the network in March 2017. Adee was formerly executive vice president of digital development and operations for the Chicago Tribune. He joined the news organization as its sports editor in the spring of 2002. He previously worked for the Chicago Sun-Times, Los Angeles Daily News, Akron Beacon Journal of Akron, Ohio, "The Virginian-Pilot" of Norfolk, Virginia, "The Daily Herald' in Arlington Heights, Illinois and the News Sun of Waukegan, Illinois.

== Biography ==
Adee was born in Kenosha, Wisconsin and grew up in Waukegan, Illinois. He is a graduate of Waukegan East High School and Northwestern University's Medill School of Journalism.

== Professional career ==
Adee earned his first byline at the Waukegan News Sun at age 16, where he covered high school sports. He became sports editor of Chicago Sun-Times in 1993 at age 29. While in the role, Adee was named to the 1999 "40 Under 40" list produced by Crain's Chicago Business with his then-wife, Joycelyn Winnecke.

Adee joined the Chicago Tribune as sports editor in 2002. In 2006, Adee became associate managing editor for innovation and was later promoted to vice president of digital in 2009.

In 2009, Adee created ChicagoNow, a blog network managed by Tribune Media Group.

In 2013, Adee was promoted to executive vice president of digital development and operations.

In 2017, Adee emerged as the COO of the Vegas Stats & Information Network. VSiN is a network which is dedicated to covering sports gambling news, and informing the public on how the sports gaming industry operates. The network broadcasts daily on iHeartRadio, Youtube TV and on the website VSiN.com.
