= Chicago Sun-Times =

Daily newspaper in Chicago, Illinois

- Front page on January 9, 2026
- Type: Daily newspaper
- Format: Tabloid
- Owner: Chicago Public Media
- Editor: Kimbriell Kelly
- Staff writers: 40
- Founded: 1948; 78 years ago
- Headquarters: 848 East Grand Avenue; Chicago, Illinois; 60611
- Country: United States
- Circulation: 57,222 average print circulation
- ISSN: 1553-8478
- OCLC number: 51500916
- Website: chicago.suntimes.com

Chicago Sun-Times logo used until 2018

Chicago Sun-Times logo in 2007

Chicago Sun-Times logo from 2003–2007

Chicago Sun-Times logo in 2003

The Chicago Sun-Times is a daily nonprofit newspaper published in Chicago, Illinois, United States. Since 2022, it is the flagship paper of Chicago Public Media, and has long held the second largest circulation among Chicago newspapers, after the Chicago Tribune.

The Sun-Times resulted from the 1948 merger of the Marshall Field III owned Chicago Sun and the Chicago Daily Times newspapers. (Note: The Chicago Sun was established in 1941, the Daily Times in 1929, although the Daily Times was founded from Daily Journal assets by the last owner of the Journal, which traced back to 1844.) Journalists at the paper have received eight Pulitzer Prizes, mostly in the 1970s; one recipient was the first film critic to receive the prize, Roger Ebert (1975), who worked at the paper from 1967 until his death in 2013. Long owned by the Marshall Field family, since the 1980s ownership of the paper has changed hands several times, including twice in the late 2010s. In 2022, the paper was acquired by Chicago Public Media—owner of public radio station WBEZ and transitioned to a non-profit model.

== History ==
The Chicago Sun-Times has claimed to be the oldest continuously published daily newspaper in the city. That claim is based on the 1844 founding of the Chicago Daily Journal, which was also the first newspaper to publish the rumor, now believed false, that a cow owned by Catherine O'Leary was responsible for the Chicago fire of 1871. The Journal, whose West Side building at 17–19 S. Canal was undamaged, gave the Chicago Tribune a temporary home until it could rebuild. Though many of the assets of the Journal were sold to the Chicago Daily News in 1929, its last owner Samuel Emory Thomason also immediately launched the tabloid Chicago Daily Illustrated Times from the same editorial offices with much the same editorial staff of the discontinued Journal.

The modern paper grew out of the 1948 merger of the Chicago Sun, founded by Marshall Field III on December 4, 1941, and the Chicago Daily Times (which had dropped the "Illustrated" from its title) published from 1929 to 1948. The newspaper was owned by Field Enterprises, controlled by the Marshall Field family, which acquired the afternoon Chicago Daily News in 1959 and launched WFLD television in 1966. When the Daily News ended its run in 1978, much of its staff, including Pulitzer Prize-winning columnist Mike Royko, were moved to the Sun-Times. During the Field period, the newspaper had a populist, progressive character that leaned Democratic but was independent of the city's Democratic establishment. Although the graphic style was urban tabloid, the paper was well regarded for journalistic quality and did not rely on sensational front-page stories. It also typically ran articles from The Washington Post/Los Angeles Times wire service.

=== 1940s, 1950s, and 1960s ===
Among the most prominent members of the newspaper's staff was cartoonist Jacob Burck, who was hired by the Chicago Times in 1938, won a Pulitzer Prize in 1941 and continued with the paper after it became the Sun-Times, drawing nearly 10,000 cartoons over a 44-year career.

The advice column Ask Ann Landers debuted in 1943. Ann Landers was the pseudonym of staff writer Ruth Crowley, who answered readers' letters until 1955. Eppie Lederer, sister of Dear Abby columnist Abigail van Buren, assumed the role thereafter as Ann Landers.

"Kup's Column", written by Irv Kupcinet, also made its first appearance in 1943.

Jack Olsen joined the Sun-Times as editor-in-chief in 1954, before moving on to Time and Sports Illustrated magazines and authoring true-crime books. Hired as literary editor in 1955 was Hoke Norris, who also covered the civil-rights movement for the Sun-Times.

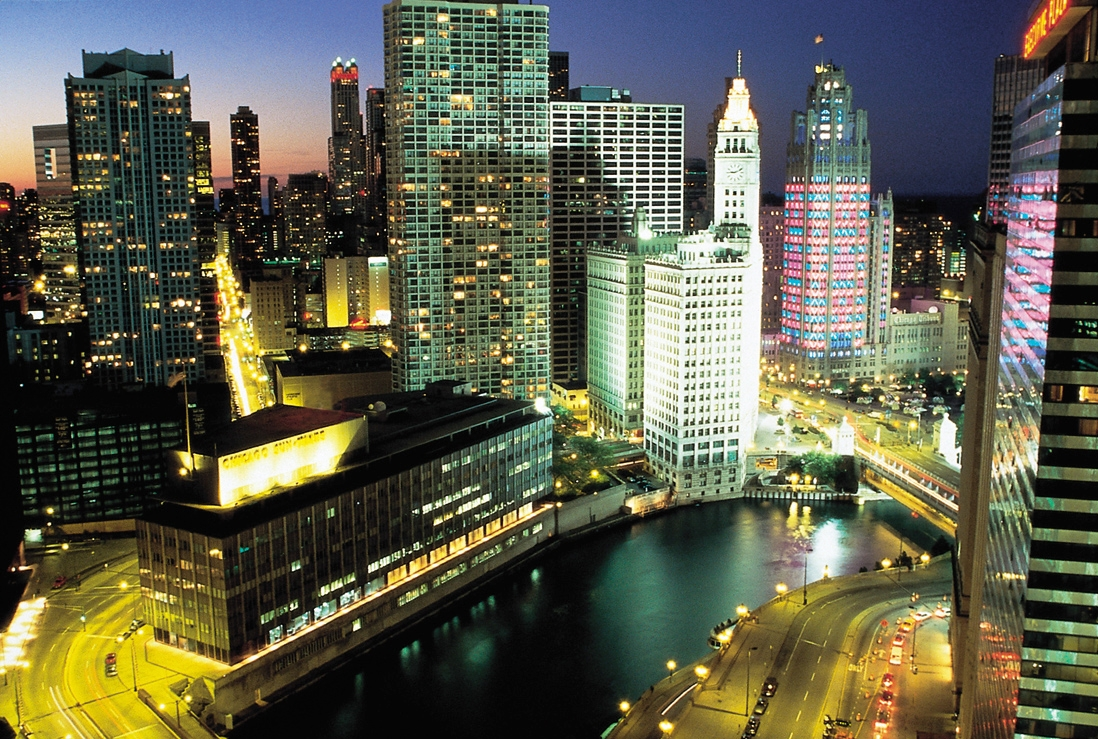
The Chicago Sun-Time press building from the 1950s to the early 2000s was a relatively low and long modernist building along the Chicago River next to the white Wrigley Building. (The Tribune Tower is farther to the right.)

Jerome Holtzman became a member of the Chicago Sun sports department after first being a copy boy for the Daily News in the 1940s. He and Edgar Munzel, another longtime sportswriter for the paper, both would end up honored by the Baseball Hall of Fame.

Famed for his World War II exploits, two-time Pulitzer Prize-winning cartoonist Bill Mauldin made the Sun-Times his home base in 1962. The following year, Mauldin drew one of his most renowned illustrations, depicting a mourning statue of Abraham Lincoln after the November 1963 assassination of John F. Kennedy.

Two years out of college, Roger Ebert became a staff writer in 1966, and a year later was named Sun-Times's film critic. He continued in this role for the remainder of his life.

=== 1970s ===
In 1975, a new sports editor at the Sun-Times, Lewis Grizzard, spiked some columns written by sportswriter Lacy J. Banks and took away a column Banks had been writing, prompting Banks to tell a friend at the Chicago Defender that Grizzard was a racist. After the friend wrote a story about it, Grizzard fired Banks. With that, the editorial employees union intervened, a federal arbitrator ruled for Banks, and 13 months later he got his job back.

A 25-part series on the Mirage Tavern, a saloon on Wells Street bought and operated by the Sun-Times in 1977, exposed a pattern of civic corruption and bribery, as city officials were investigated and photographed without their knowledge. The articles received considerable publicity and acclaim, but a nomination for the Pulitzer Prize met resistance from some who believed the Mirage series represented a form of entrapment.

In March 1978, the venerable afternoon publication the Chicago Daily News, sister paper of the Sun-Times, went out of business. The two newspapers shared the same ownership and office building. James F. Hoge, Jr., editor and publisher of the Daily News, assumed the same positions at the Sun-Times, which also retained a number of the Daily News's editorial personnel.

=== 1980s ===
In 1980, the Sun-Times hired syndicated TV columnist Gary Deeb away from the rival Chicago Tribune. Deeb then left the Sun-Times in the spring of 1983 to try his hand at TV. He joined Chicago's WLS-TV in September 1983.

In July 1981, prominent Sun-Times investigative reporter Pam Zekman, who had been part of a Pulitzer Prize-winning team with the Chicago Tribune in 1976, announced she was leaving the Sun-Times to join WBBM-TV in Chicago in August 1981 as chief of its new investigative unit. "Salary wasn't a factor," she told the Tribune. "The station showed a commitment to investigative journalism. It was something I wanted to try."

Pete Souza left the Sun-Times in 1983 to become official White House photographer for President Ronald Reagan until his second term's end in 1989. Souza returned to that position to be the official photographer for President Barack Obama.

Baseball writer Jerome Holtzman defected from the Sun-Times to the Tribune in late 1981, while Mike Downey also left Sun-Times sports in September 1981 to be a columnist at the Detroit Free Press.

In January 1984, noted Sun-Times business reporter James Warren quit to join the rival Chicago Tribune. He became the Tribune's Washington bureau chief and later its managing editor for features.

In 1984, Field Enterprises co-owners, half-brothers Marshall Field V and Ted Field, sold the paper to Rupert Murdoch's News Corporation, and the paper's style changed abruptly to mirror that of its suitemate, the New York Post. Its front pages tended more to the sensational, while its political stance shifted markedly to the right. This was in the era that the Chicago Tribune had begun softening its traditionally staunchly Republican editorial line, blurring the city's clear division between the two newspapers' politics. This shift was made all but official when Mike Royko defected to the Tribune.

Roger Ebert later reflected on the incident with disdain, stating in his blog,

On the first day of Murdoch's ownership, he walked into the newsroom and we all gathered around and he recited the usual blather and rolled up his shirtsleeves and started to lay out a new front page. Well, he was a real newspaperman, give him that. He threw out every meticulous detail of the beautiful design, ordered up big, garish headlines, and gave big play to a story about a North Shore rabbi accused of holding a sex slave. The story turned out to be fatally flawed, but so what? It sold papers. Well, actually, it didn't sell papers. There were hundreds of cancellations. Soon our precious page 3 was defaced by a daily Wingo girl, a pinup in a bikini promoting a cash giveaway. The Sun-Times, which had been placing above the Tribune in lists of the 10 best U.S. newspapers, never took that great step it was poised for.

Murdoch sold the paper in 1986 (to buy its former sister television station WFLD to launch the Fox network) for $145 million in cash in a leveraged buyout to an investor group led by the paper's publisher, Robert E. Page, and the New York investment firm Adler & Shaykin.

In 1984, Roger Simon, who had been a Sun-Times columnist for a decade, quit to join The Baltimore Sun, where he worked until 1995. Simon quit the paper because of Murdoch's purchase of it. Beginning in October 1984, Simon's columns from Baltimore began appearing in the rival Chicago Tribune.

In November 1986, The Sun-Times acquired Star Publications, a chain of 12 south and southwest suburban papers published twice weekly, for an undisclosed sum.

In December 1986, the Sun-Times hired high-profile gossip columnist Michael Sneed away from the rival Chicago Tribune, where she had been co-authoring the Tribune's own "Inc." gossip column with Kathy O'Malley. On December 3, 1986, O'Malley led off the Tribune's "Inc." column with the heading "The Last to Know Dept." and writing, "Dontcha just hate it when you write a gossip column and people think you know all the news about what's going on and your partner gets a new job and your column still has her name on it on the very same day that her new employer announces that she's going to work for him? Yeah, INC. just hates it when that happens."

In February 1987, the popular syndicated advice column Ask Ann Landers left the Sun-Times after 31 years to jump to the rival Chicago Tribune, effective March 15, 1987. The move sparked a nationwide hunt for a new advice columnist for the Sun-Times. After more than 12,000 responses from people aged 4 to 85, the paper ultimately hired two: Jeffrey Zaslow, then a 28-year-old Wall Street Journal reporter, and Diane Crowley, a 47-year-old lawyer, teacher and daughter of Ruth Crowley, who had been the original Ann Landers columnist from 1943 until 1955. Crowley left to return to the practice of law in 1993 and the paper decided not to renew Zaslow's contract in 2001.

By the summer of 1988, Page and Adler & Shaykin managing partner Leonard P. Shaykin had developed a conflict, and in August 1988, Page resigned as publisher and president and sold his interest in the paper to his fellow investors.

In January 1989, the Sun-Times company starts its plans to purchase The Pioneer Press and its 38 different weekly publications.

=== 1990s ===
In mid-1991, veteran crime reporter Art Petacque, who had won a Pulitzer Prize in 1974, left the paper. Almost ten years later, Dennis Britton, who had been the paper's editor at the time of Petacque's retirement, told the Chicago Reader that Petacque's departure, which was described at the time as a retirement, was involuntary. "I had problems with some of the ways Art pursued his job," Britton told the Reader.

In September 1992, Bill Zwecker joined the Sun-Times as a gossip columnist from the troubled Lerner Newspapers suburban weekly newspaper chain, where he had written the "VIPeople" column.

In September 1992, Sun-Times sports clerk Peter Anding was arrested in the Sun-Times' newsroom and held without bond after confessing to using his position to set up sexual encounters for male high school athletes. Anding was charged with aggravated criminal sexual assault and possession of child pornography. In September 1993, Anding pleaded guilty to arranging and videotaping sexual encounters with several teenage boys and fondling others. He was sentenced to 40 years in prison.

In 1993, the Sun-Times fired photographer Bob Black without severance for dozens of unauthorized uses of the company's Federal Express account and outside photo lab, going back more than three years and costing the company more than $1,400 (equivalent to $3,100 in 2025.) In February 1994, however, Black rejoined the paper's payroll after an arbitrator agreed with the paper's union that dismissal was too severe a penalty. At the same time, the arbitrator declined to award Black back pay.

In 1993, longtime Sun-Times reporter Larry Weintraub retired after 35 years at the paper. Weintraub had been best known for his "Weintraub's World" column, in which he worked a job and wrote about the experience. Weintraub died in 2001 at age 69.

In February 1994, the Adler & Shaykin investor group sold the Sun-Times to Hollinger Inc. for about $180 million. Hollinger was controlled, indirectly, by Canadian-born businessman Conrad Black. After Black and his associate David Radler were indicted for skimming money from Hollinger International, through retaining noncompete payments from the sale of Hollinger newspapers, they were removed from the board, and Hollinger International was renamed the Sun-Times Media Group.

In 1994, noted reporter M.W. Newman retired from the Sun-Times around the age of 77. Newman, who died of lung cancer in 2001, had been with the Sun-Times since the Chicago Daily News closed in 1978 and had focused his efforts on urban reporting. Among other things, Newman had been known for coining the term "Big John" to describe the John Hancock Center and the expression "Fortress Illini" for the concrete structures and plazas at the University of Illinois at Chicago.

On March 23, 1995, the Sun-Times announced that beginning April 2, 1995, veteran Sports Illustrated writer Rick Telander would join the paper and write four columns a week.

On March 24, 1995, the Sun-Times published an editorial by Mark Hornung, then the Sun-Times' editorial page editor, that plagiarized a Washington Post editorial that had appeared in that paper the day before. Hornung attributed the plagiarism to writer's block, deadline pressures and the demands of other duties. He resigned as editorial page editor, but remained with the paper, shifting to its business side and working first as director of distribution and then as vice president of circulation. In 2002, Hornung became president and publisher of Midwest Suburban Publishing, which was a company owned by then-Sun Times parent company Hollinger International. In June 2004, Hollinger International placed Hornung on administrative leave just two weeks after Hollinger revealed that the paper's sales figures had been inflated for several years. Hornung resigned from the company four days later.

On May 17, 1995, the Sun-Times' food section published a bogus letter from a reader named "Olga Fokyercelf" that Chicago Tribune columnist (and former Sun-Times columnist) Mike Royko called "an imaginative prank" in a column. In that same column, Royko criticized the paper's food writer, who edited the readers' column at the time, Olivia Wu, for not following better quality control. The Wall Street Journal then criticized Royko with an article of its own, titled, "Has a Curmudgeon Turned Into a Bully? Some Now Think So...Picking on a Food Writer." Although the Sun-Times began hiring a freelancer to edit the space and look for double entendres, another one made it into the same column on July 26, 1995, when the section published a letter from a "Phil McCraken." "This one was a little more subtle," a reporter outside the food department told the Chicago Reader.

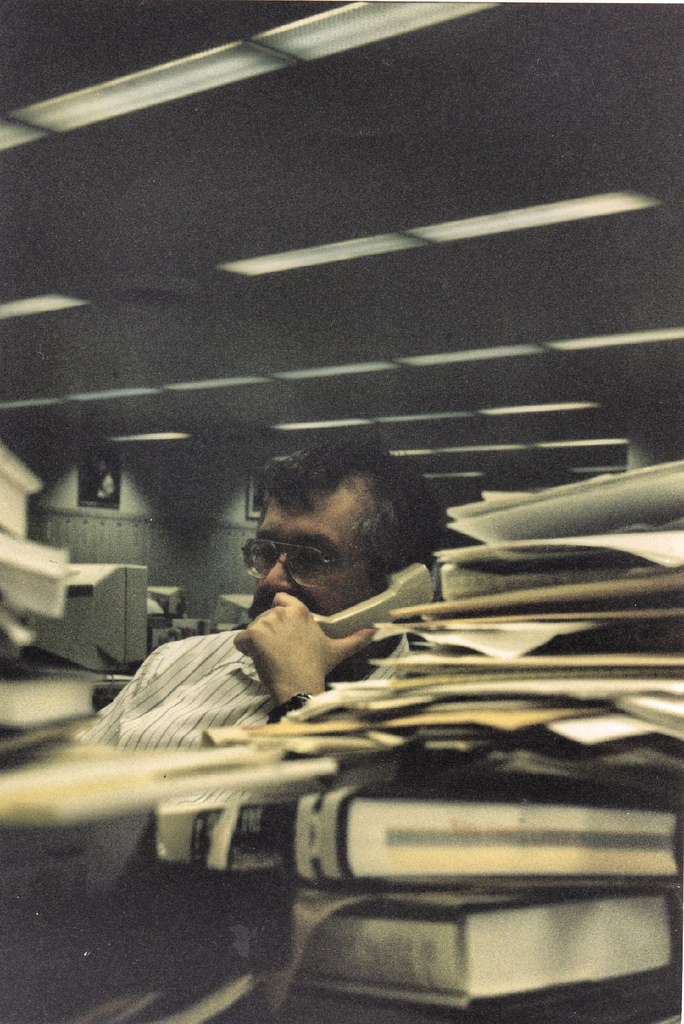
Chuck Neubauer in the former Chicago Sun-Times newsroom, 1998

In 1998, the Sun-Times demoted longtime TV critic Lon Grahnke, shifting him to covering education. Grahnke, who died in 2006 at age 56 of Alzheimer's disease, remained with the paper until 2001, when he retired following an extended medical leave.

=== 2000s ===
In 2000, the Sun-Times new editors, Michael Cooke and John Cruickshank, tapped longtime staff reporter Mark Brown, who had considered himself an investigative reporter, to write a column that would anchor page two of the paper.

In 2000, longtime investigative reporter Charles Nicodemus retired from the paper at age 69 and died in 2008 at age 77.

In 2001, Sun-Times investigative reporter Chuck Neubauer quit the paper to join the Los Angeles Times' Washington bureau. Neubauer and Brown had initiated the investigation into U.S. Rep. Dan Rostenkowski that uncovered a variety of misdeeds that ultimately had led to Rostenkowski's indictment, conviction and imprisonment.

In April 2001, Sun-Times architecture critic Lee Bey quit to join the administration of then-Chicago Mayor Richard M. Daley as Daley's deputy mayoral chief of staff, responsible for downtown planning, rewriting the city's zoning code and affordable housing issues.

In April 2001, longtime Sun-Times horse-racing writer Dave Feldman died at age 85 while still on the payroll.

In May 2002, Sun-Times editors Joycelyn Winnecke and Bill Adee, who were then husband and wife, both quit on the same day to join the rival Chicago Tribune. Winnecke had been the Sun-Times managing editor, and she left for a new post, associate managing editor for national news, while Adee, who had been the Sun-Times sports editor for nine years, became the Tribune's sports editor/news.

In October 2003, Sun-Times gossip columnist Irv Kupcinet began including the name of his longtime assistant of nearly 34 years, Stella Foster, as the coauthor of his column. After Kupcinet died the following month at age 91, the Sun-Times kept Foster on and gave her the sole byline on the column, which became known as "Stella's Column." Foster retired from the newspaper in 2012.

In 2004, the Sun-Times was censured by the Audit Bureau of Circulations for misrepresenting its circulation figures.

In February 2004, longtime Sun-Times political columnist Steve Neal died at his home in Hinsdale, Illinois, at age 54, of an apparent suicide.

In August 2004, longtime Chicago broadcast journalist Carol Marin began writing regular columns in the Sun-Times, mostly on political issues.

In March 2005, the Chicago Tribune hired away television critic Phil Rosenthal to become its media columnist. He eventually was replaced as TV critic by Doug Elfman.

On September 28, 2005, Sun-Times columnist and editorial board member Neil Steinberg was arrested in his home in Northbrook, Illinois and charged with domestic battery and with interfering with the reporting of domestic battery. With that, Steinberg, who had been at the Sun-Times since 1987, entered a treatment facility for alcohol abuse. On November 23, 2005, Cook County prosecutors dropped the charges against Steinberg after his wife said she no longer feared for her safety. On November 28, 2005, Steinberg returned to the Sun-Times' pages after going through a 28-day rehabilitation program at a nearby hospital, and he gave readers his version of the events that led to his arrest: "I got drunk and slapped my wife during an argument." Steinberg also reported that he and his wife were "on the mend," and that he was working toward sobriety.

In the spring of 2006, a variety of longtime Sun-Times writers and columnists took buyouts, including sports columnist Ron Rapoport, sports reporter Joe Goddard, society and gardening columnist Mary Cameron Frey, book editor Henry Kisor, page designer Roy Moody and photographer Bob Black. Classical music critic Wynne Delacoma also took a buyout, and left the paper later.

In August 2006, the Sun-Times dismissed longtime Chicago Cubs beat writer Mike Kiley. Then-Sun-Times sports editor Stu Courtney told the Tribune that the dismissal of Kiley, who had joined the Sun-Times from the Tribune in 1996, was a "personnel matter I can't comment on." The Tribune's Teddy Greenstein called Kiley "a fierce competitor."

In February 2007, noted Sun-Times columnist Debra Pickett quit upon returning from maternity leave. The reasons for her departure were differences with her editors over where her column appeared and the sorts of assignments being handed to her.

On July 10, 2007, newly appointed Editorial Page Editor Cheryl Reed announced: "We [the Chicago Sun-Times editorial page] are returning to our liberal, working-class roots, a position that pits us squarely opposite the Chicago Tribune—that Republican, George Bush—touting paper over on moneyed Michigan Avenue."

In January 2008, the Sun-Times underwent two rounds of layoffs. In its first round, the Sun-Times fired editorial board members Michael Gillis, Michelle Stevens and Lloyd Sachs, along with Sunday editor Marcia Frellick and assistant managing editor Avis Weathersbee.

On February 4, 2008, Editorial Page Editor Cheryl Reed resigned saying in a front-page Chicago Tribune story that she was "deeply troubled" that the paper's presidential primary endorsements of Barack Obama and John McCain were subjected to "wholesale rewrites" by editorial board outsiders. Cyrus Freidheim Jr., in his role as Sun-Times publisher, issued a statement reassuring staff that the endorsements did not change and that the rewrites only "deepened and strengthened the messages."

Later that month, the Sun-Times underwent more staff reductions, laying off columnist Esther Cepeda, religion reporter Susan Hogan/Albach, TV critic Doug Elfman, real estate editor Sally Duros, and onetime editor Garry Steckles, while giving buyouts to assistant city editors Robert C. Herguth and Nancy Moffett, environmental reporter Jim Ritter, copy editors Chris Whitehead and Bob Mutter, editorial columnist Steve Huntley (who remained with the paper as a freelance columnist), and special Barack Obama correspondent Jennifer Hunter. Also taking a buyout was longtime health and technology reporter Howard Wolinsky. Two other staffers, business editor Dan Miller and deputy metro editor Phyllis Gilchrist, resigned.

In August 2008, high-profile sports columnist Jay Mariotti resigned from the Sun-Times after concluding that the future of sports journalism was online.

In October 2008, the Sun-Times gave buyouts to noted TV/radio writer Robert Feder (a blogger with Time Out Chicago and then an independent writer on Chicago media) and longtime auto writer Dan Jedlicka. The paper also laid off two members of its editorial board: Teresa Puente and Deborah Douglas.

In November 2008, the Sun-Times dropped its "Quick Takes" column, which Sun-Times columnist Zay N. Smith had written since 1995. Smith wrote the column from home, and the Sun-Times discontinued the column and informed Smith that it needed him back in the newsroom as a general assignment reporter. The paper's union complained, noting that Smith had permanent physical disabilities that made it difficult for him to be mobile. Smith later left the paper.

In March 2009, sports columnist Greg Couch left the Sun-Times after 12 years to join AOL Sports.

On March 31, 2009, the newspaper filed for bankruptcy protection.

On October 9, 2009, the Sun Times unions agreed to concessions paving the way for Jim Tyree to buy the newspaper and its 50 suburban newspapers. Of the $25 million purchase price, $5 million was in cash, with the other $20 million to help pay off past debts.

In November 2009, Sun-Times sports editor Stu Courtney quit to join the rival Chicago Tribune's Chicago Breaking Sports website.

In December 2009, the Sun-Times hired sports columnist Rick Morrissey away from the rival Chicago Tribune.

=== 2010s ===
In April 2010, longtime Sun-Times pop music critic Jim DeRogatis resigned from the paper to join the faculty of Columbia College Chicago and to begin blogging at Vocalo.org.

In June 2010, the Sun-Times laid off a group of editorial employees, including longtime sports media columnist Jim O'Donnell and features writer Delia O'Hara.

In October 2010, the Sun-Times laid off longtime sports columnist Carol Slezak, who by that point had shifted to feature reporting.

At the end of June 2010, longtime Sun-Times sportswriter Len Ziehm, who covered many sports but largely focused on golf, retired after 41 years at the paper.

Sun-Times Media group chairman James C. Tyree died under sudden circumstances in March 2011. Jeremy Halbreich, chief executive, said that Tyree's will be greatly missed and that his death will make no changes in the media company's strategy.

Also in March 2011, the Sun-Times laid off six editorial reporters and writers: high school sports reporter Steve Tucker, reporter Misha Davenport, general assignment reporter Cheryl Jackson, media and marketing columnist Lewis Lazare, feature writer Celeste Busk and sportswriter John Jackson.

In May 2011, the Sun-Times laid off real estate writer Bill Cunniff, features reporter Jeff Johnson and gaming writer John Grochowski, along with graphic designer Char Searl.

In June 2011, the Sun-Times fired longtime TV critic Paige Wiser after she admitted to fabricating portions of a review of a Glee Live! In Concert! performance. She admitted to attending much of the concert but leaving early to tend to her children. The paper eventually tapped longtime travel writer Lori Rackl to replace Wiser as TV critic.

The Sun-Times announced in July 2011 that it would close its printing plant on Ashland Avenue in Chicago—eliminating 400 printing jobs—and would outsource the printing of the newspaper to the rival Chicago Tribune. The move was estimated to save $10 million a year. The Sun-Times already had been distributed by the Tribune since 2007.

In August 2011, the Sun-Times laid off three more reporters and writers: sportswriter Mike Mulligan, "Quick Hits" sports columnist Elliott Harris and photographer Keith Hale.

In September 2011, the Sun-Times fired longtime restaurant reviewer (and freelancer) Pat Bruno.

In October 2011, the Sun-Times discontinued the longtime comic strip Drabble (syndicated by Newspaper Enterprise Association), which the paper had run since the strip's inception in 1979. The comic strip was the victim of a reduced page size.

At the end of May 2013, the publication's photography department was dissolved as part of a restructuring that involves the use of freelance photographers and non-photographer journalists to provide visual content. Under the terms of a settlement with the paper's union, the Sun-Times reinstated four of those photographers as multimedia journalists in March 2014: Rich Chapman, Brian Jackson, Al Podgorski and Michael Schmidt.

In March 2014, pop culture reporter Dave Hoekstra left the Sun-Times in a buyout after 29 years with the paper. Concurrent with Hoekstra's departure, the company also laid off two Sun-Times editorial assistants, two editors at the SouthtownStar, a community editor at the Post-Tribune of Northwest Indiana and a weekend editor/designer at the company's west suburban newspaper group.

In March 2016, Shia Kapos signed on to bring her Taking Names column to the Sun-Times. She had been writing the gossip column since 2007 for Crain's Business.

On July 13, 2017, it was reported that a consortium consisting of private investors and the Chicago Federation of Labor led by businessman and former Chicago alderman Edwin Eisendrath through his company ST Acquisition Holdings, had acquired the paper and its parent company, Sun-Times Media Group, from then-owner Wrapports, beating out Chicago-based publishing company Tronc (formerly Tribune Publishing Company) for ownership.

In March 2019, a new ownership group took over and took control of the Sun-Times from the previous union ownership. The group, Sun-Times Investment Holdings LLC, was backed by prominent Chicago investors Michael Sacks and Rocky Wirtz.

=== 2020s ===
In September 2021, the board of directors of Chicago Public Media—operator of the city's National Public Radio affiliate WBEZ—approved a non-binding letter of intent to explore acquiring the Sun-Times, and transitioning it to a reader-supported non-profit model. The paper's CEO Nykia Wright stated that the proposed sale would allow it to "invest in our people, improve the news products we create and strengthen our digital future", while Chicago Public Media CEO Matt Moog stated that combining the Sun-Times' resources with those of WBEZ would create "the largest newsroom in the city of Chicago, and what we think might be the largest non-profit local newsroom in the country." The proposal was guided by Jim Friedlich (chief executive of the Lenfest Institute for Journalism, which had transitioned The Philadelphia Inquirer to a similar non-profit model), who stated that the sale could help contrast the "gutting" of Chicago's newspapers by "out-of-town hedge fund owners" (alluding to the sale of the Chicago Tribune to Alden Global Capital).

On January 18, 2022, the sale was approved by Chicago Public Media's board, and it was completed on January 31, 2022. There were no immediate plans to cut staff, and both WBEZ and the Sun-Times planned to maintain separate newsrooms while sharing resources and reporting. The sale was backed by $61 million in grants, including from Sacks, and donations by the Knight Foundation, the MacArthur Foundation, and the Chicago Community Trust among others. In June 2022, Jennifer Kho was appointed executive editor. She replaced veteran investigative reporter Steve Warmbir, who had shepherded the paper as interim editor during the COVID-19 pandemic and ownership changes, and initial integration with Chicago Public Media. In October 2022, the Sun-Times dropped its digital paywall and subscription model in favor of a voluntary, membership-based model, encouraging donations from readers and sponsors.

In 2021, Moog resigned as CEO; in 2024, he was succeeded as CEO of Chicago Public Media by Vox co-founder Melissa Bell. In March 2025, Chicago Public Media laid off 35 employees via voluntary buyouts, including 23 journalists from the Sun-Times. The cuts came amid $1.1 million in financial losses the paper faced in fiscal year 2024 That same month, the paper announced it will no longer publish editorials, but would continue to publish columns and op-eds.

== Facilities ==
The headquarters are in the Chicago Navy Pier. WBEZ, affiliated with the newspaper, is the lessee of 45,000 square feet (4,200 m^{2}) of space, which has radio and newspaper functions.

Prior to 2004, the headquarters were on Wabash Avenue. The newspaper had its headquarters in 350 North Orleans for a 13-year period, from 2004 to 2017. In 2017, the Sun-Times moved to a facility on Racine, and in 2022 it was to open a facility in the Old Chicago Main Post Office.

== Awards and notable stories ==
Journalists at the Sun-Times have won eight Pulitzer Prizes.

- 1970: Tom Fitzpatrick, General Reporting
- 1971: Jack Dykinga, Feature Photography
- 1973: Ron Powers, Criticism
- 1974: Art Petacque, Hugh Hough, General Reporting
- 1975: Roger Ebert, Criticism
- 1982: John H. White, Feature Photography
- 1989: Jack Higgins, Editorial Cartooning
- 2011: Frank Main, Mark Konkol and John J. Kim, Local Reporting

Doug Moench was nominated for a Chicago Newspaper Guild Award in 1972 for his stream-of-consciousness story on violence in the Chicago subway system. In 1978, the newspaper conducted the Mirage Tavern investigation, in which undercover reporters operated a bar and caught city officials taking bribes on camera.

In January 2004, after a six-month investigation written by Tim Novak and Steve Warmbir, the paper broke the story of the Hired Truck Program scandal.

After a Sun-Times article by Michael Sneed erroneously identified the perpetrator of the April 16, 2007 Virginia Tech massacre as an unnamed Chinese national, the People's Republic of China criticized the Chicago Sun-Times for publishing what it called "irresponsible reports." The newspaper later silently withdrew the story without making any apologies or excuses.

The Sunday, May 18, 2025 edition of the Sun-Times gained attention online for a "Summer Reading list for 2025" with AI-generated content that included nonexistent books and made-up quotes. The list was part of a 64-page "Best of Summer" promotional insert written by Marco Buscaglia, who admitted to 404 Media that he used AI and did not fact-check the material. The insert included other AI-fabricated material and quotes. The content was licensed from King Media, a subsidiary of Hearst, and also appeared in the Philadelphia Inquirer.

== Staff ==
The Sun-Times' best-known writer was film critic Roger Ebert, who died in April 2013. Chicago columnist Mike Royko, previously of the defunct Chicago Daily News, came to the paper in 1978 but left for the Chicago Tribune in 1984 when the Sun-Times was purchased by Rupert Murdoch's News Corp. Irv Kupcinet's daily column was a fixture from 1943 until his death in 2003. It was also the home base of famed cartoonist Bill Mauldin from 1962 to 1991, as well as advice columnist Ann Landers and the Washington veteran Robert Novak for many years. Lisa Myers, the Senior Investigative Correspondent for NBC News, was the publication's Washington correspondent from 1977 to 1979. Author Charles Dickinson worked as a copy editor for the publication from 1983 to 1989.

The newspaper gave a start in journalism to columnist Bob Greene, while other notable writers such as Mary Mitchell, Richard Roeper, Gary Houston, Michael Sneed, Mark Brown, Neil Steinberg, sportswriters Rick Telander and Rick Morrissey, theater critic Hedy Weiss, Carol Marin, Pulitzer Prize-winning reporters Frank Main and Mark Konkol, and technology expert Andy Ihnatko have written for the Sun-Times. As of October 2013, Lynn Sweet is the Washington Bureau Chief and Pulitzer Prize-winner Jack Higgins is the publication's editorial cartoonist.

John Cruickshank became the publisher in 2003 after David Radler, and on September 19, 2007, announced he was resigning to head the Canadian Broadcasting Corporation's news division.

On May 30, 2013, the Sun-Times laid off the vast majority of its photography staff as part of a change in its structure, opting instead to use photos and video shot by reporters, as well as content from freelancers, instead. Two staff photographers remained after the restructure: Rich Hein was named Photo Editor and Jessica Koscielniak, who was hired in January 2013, became the newspapers' only multimedia reporter. Among those photographers who were laid off was Pulitzer Prize winning photographer John White. In an official statement, the newspaper explained: "The Sun-Times business is changing rapidly and our audiences are consistently seeking more video content with their news. We have made great progress in meeting this demand and are focused on bolstering our reporting capabilities with video and other multimedia elements."

== Early Edition ==
The paper was featured in the CBS show Early Edition, where the lead character mysteriously receives each Chicago Sun-Times newspaper the day before it is actually published.

== Gallery ==
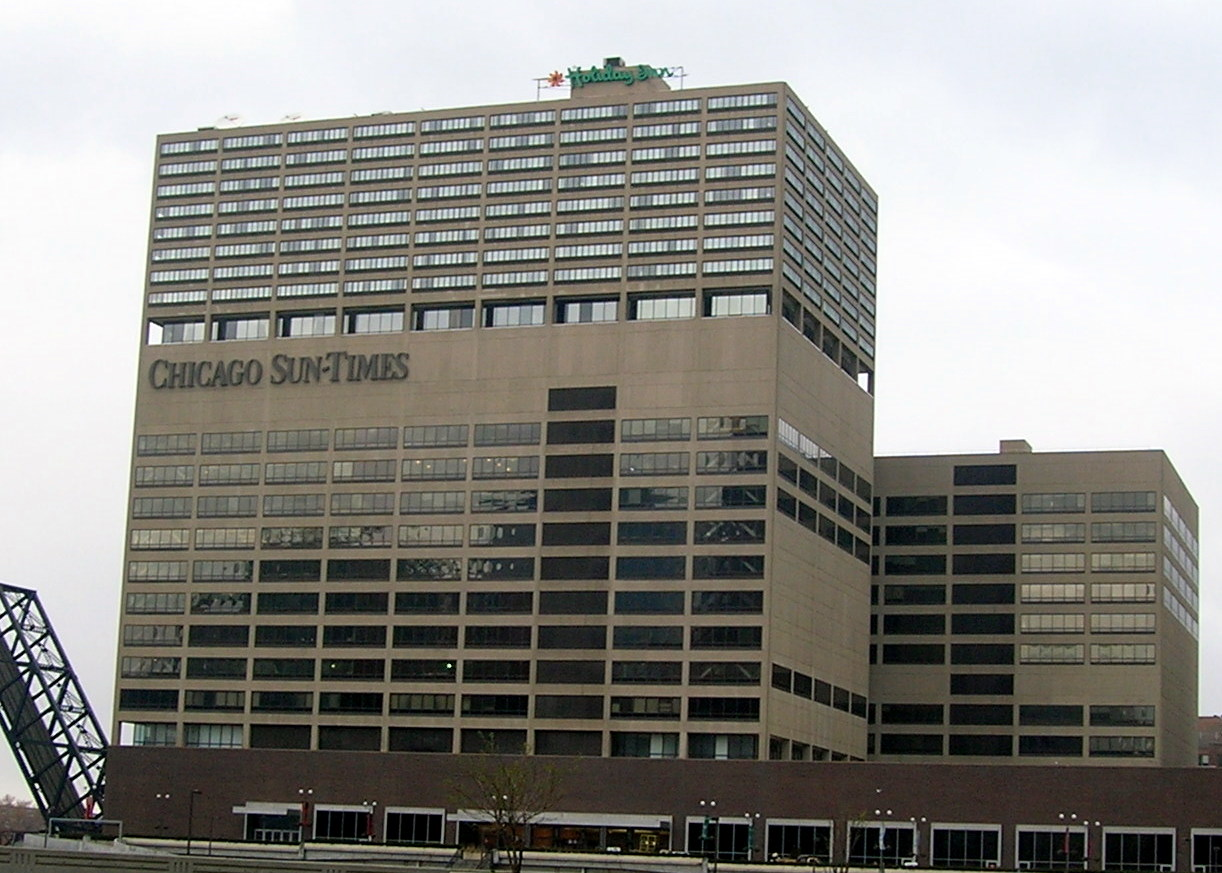
Former Chicago Sun-Times headquarters, located in the River North Point building at 350 North Orleans Street

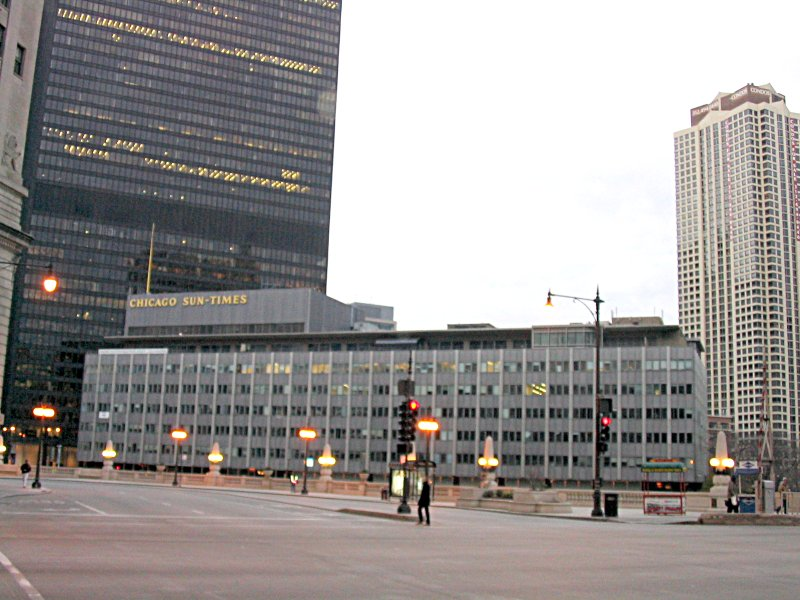
Former Chicago Sun-Times headquarters, demolished in 2004 to make way for the Trump Tower

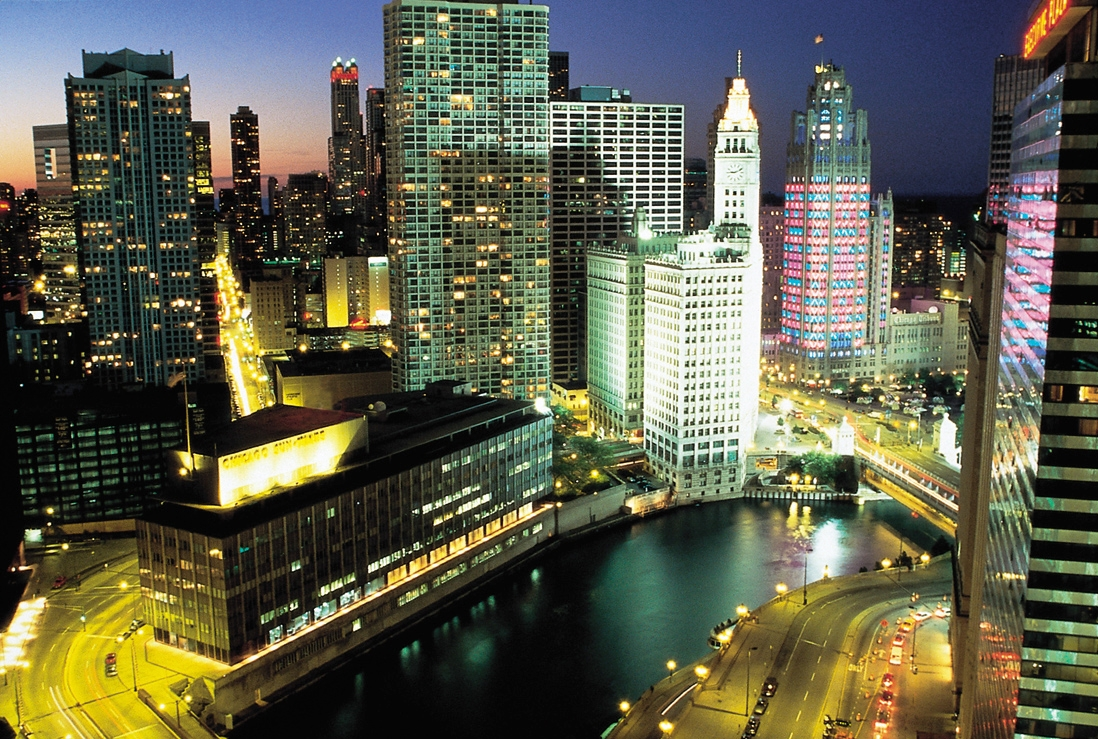
Former Chicago Sun-Times headquarters with Wrigley Building and Tribune Tower

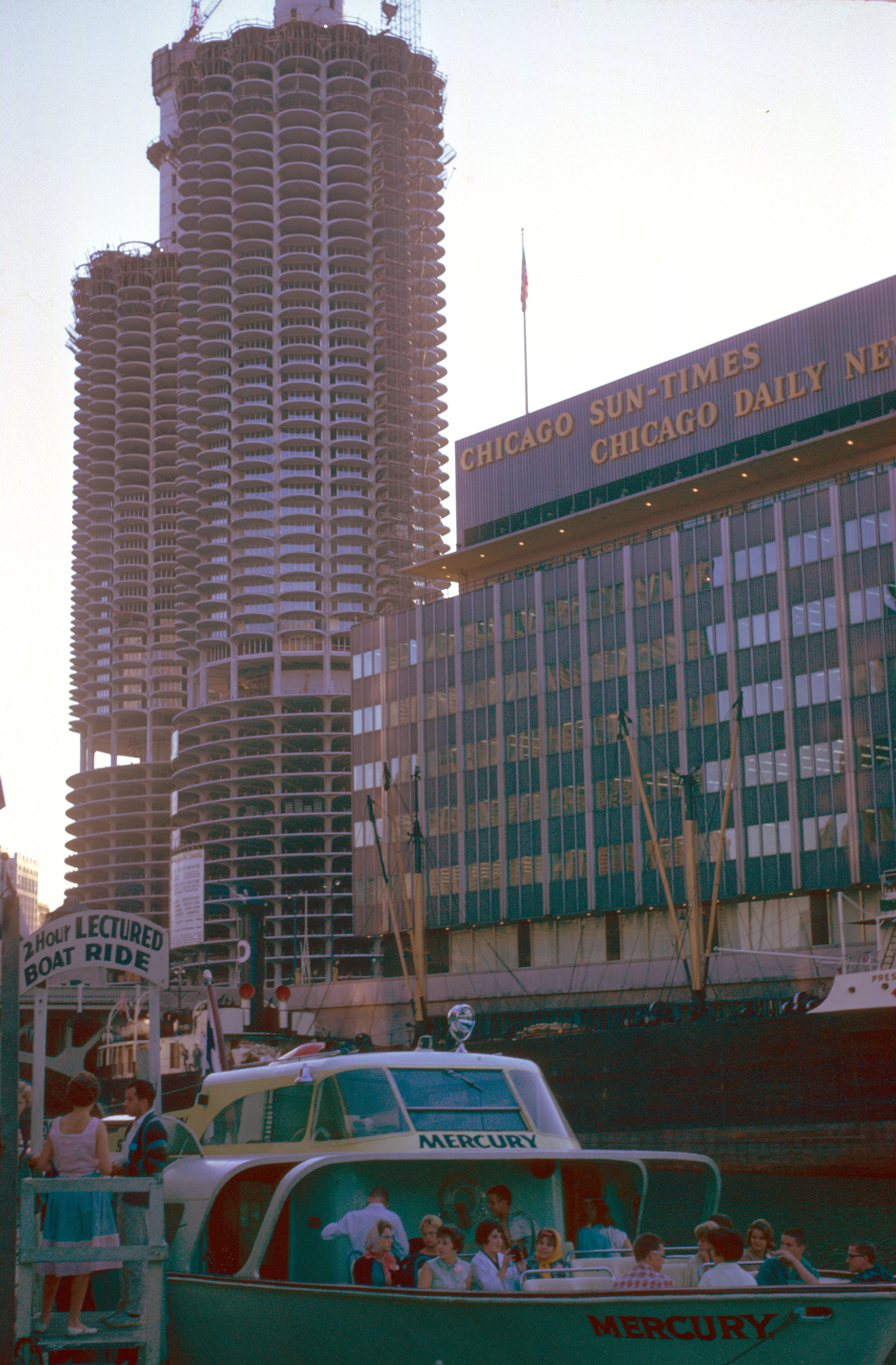
Former Sun Times and Daily News headquarters

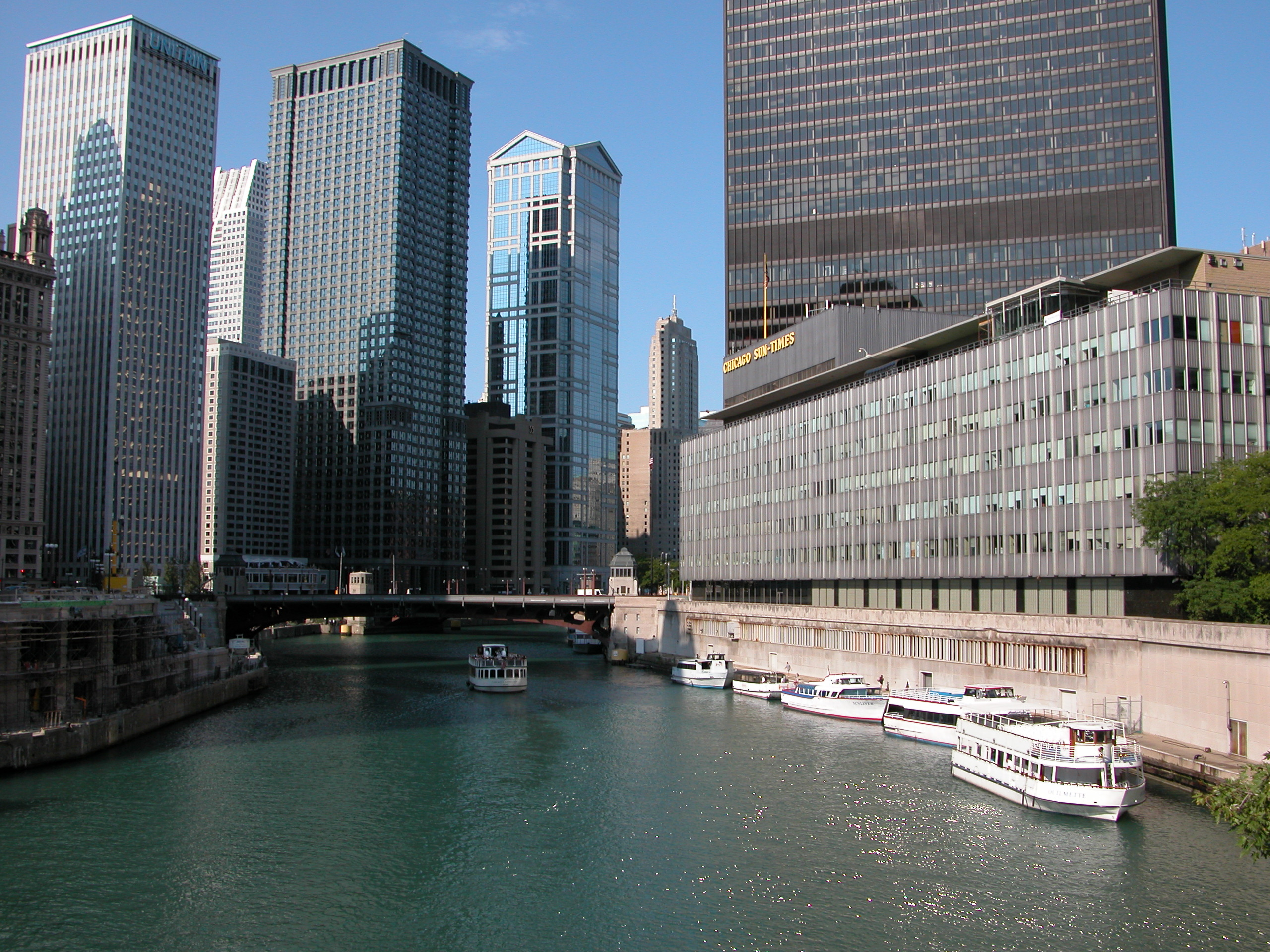
Viewed from Michigan Avenue Bridge with 330 North Wabash

=== Logos ===
2003

2007

2011

2015

2016–2018

2019
