= Margo McDermed =

American politician

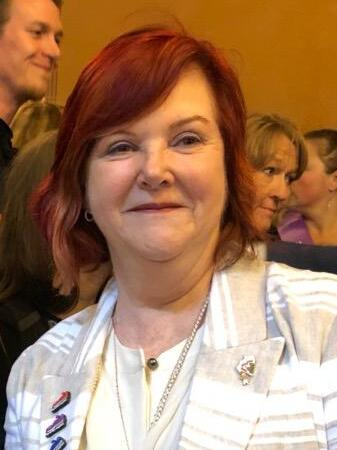
- McDermed in 2019

Member of the Illinois House of Representatives from the 37th district
- In office January 8, 2015 – January 4, 2021
- Preceded by: Renée Kosel
- Succeeded by: Tim Ozinga

Personal details
- Party: Republican
- Children: 2
- Education: Simmons College ( B.A.); DePaul University (J.D.)
- Profession: Attorney

Margo McDermed is an American politician.

== Education ==
In 1973, McDermed earned a BA in communications from Simmons College. In 1976, McDermed earned a JD in law from DePaul University College of Law.

== Career ==
McDermed is a Republican member of the Illinois House of Representatives who represents the 37th district. The 37th district, located in the Chicago metropolitan area, includes all or parts of Frankfort, Frankfort Square, Homer Glen, Ingalls Park, Mokena, New Lenox, Orland Park, and Tinley Park.

McDermed was an attorney working in the petroleum industry for thirty years before retiring. Prior to her election to the Illinois House of Representatives, she served as the Township Collector, a Township Trustee, and Township Clerk in Frankfort Township and a member of the Will County Board.

McDermed opted not to run for reelection in 2020 and stepped down on January 4, 2021, with several days remaining in the 101st General Assembly. The Republican Representative Committee of the Republican Party of the 37th Representative District appointed Tim Ozinga, winner of the 2020 general election to serve the remainder of McDermed's term.

== Electoral history ==
Illinois 37th State House District Republican Primary, 2014
Party	Candidate	Votes	%
Republican	Margo McDermed	5,630	55.55
Republican	Arthur Lukowski	2,438	24.06
Republican	Gayla Smith	2,067	20.39
Total votes		10,135	100.0

Illinois 37th State House District General Election, 2014
Party	Candidate	Votes	%
Republican	Margo McDermed	26,168	68.93
Democratic	Nichole Serbin	11,797	31.07
Total votes		37,965	100.0

Illinois 37th State House District General Election, 2016
Party	Candidate	Votes	%
Republican	Margo McDermed (incumbent)	45,721	100.0
Total votes		45,721	100.0

Illinois 37th State House District General Election, 2018
Party	Candidate	Votes	%
Republican	Margo McDermed (incumbent)	27,148	57.98
Democratic	Matthew J. Hunt	19,675	42.02
Total votes		46,823	100.0

== Personal life ==
McDermed's husband is Edward. They have two children.
