= 80th Avenue/Tinley Park station =

Commuter rail station in Tinley Park, Illinois

80th Avenue Tinley Park

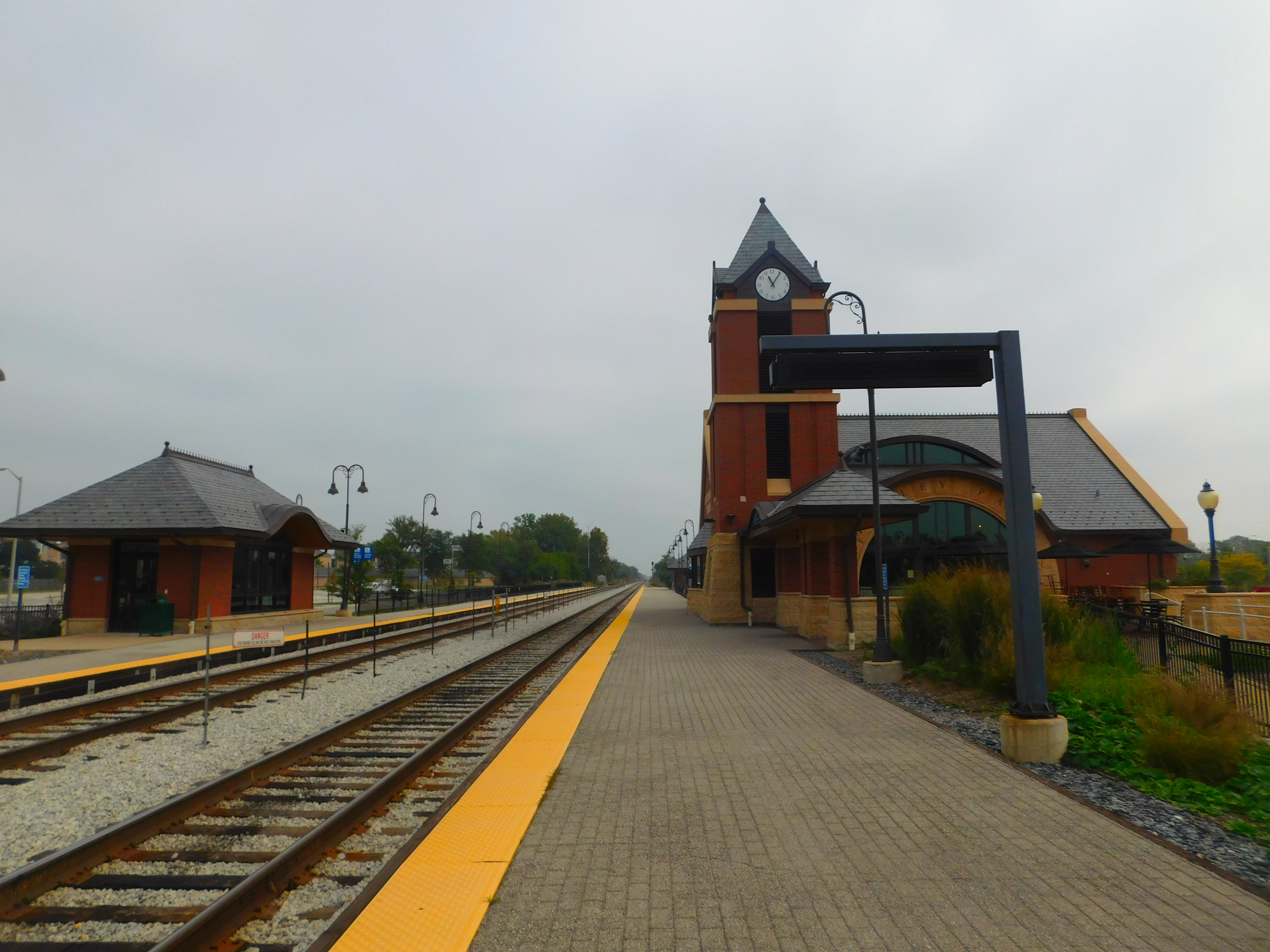
- The 80th Avenue depot in September 2016

General information
- Location: 18001 South 80th Avenue; Tinley Park, Illinois, U.S.
- Coordinates: 41.5643°N 87.8095°W
- Owner: Metra
- Line: Joliet Subdistrict
- Platforms: 2 side platforms
- Tracks: 2

Construction
- Structure type: At-grade
- Parking: 2,177 spaces
- Cycle facilities: Yes
- Accessible: Yes

Other information
- Fare zone: 4

History
- Opened: 1970
- Rebuilt: 2010–2012

Passengers
- October 2025: 1,210 (average weekday)
- Rank: 10 out of 236

Services
Preceding station	Metra	Following station
Hickory Creek toward Joliet	Rock Island	Tinley Park toward LaSalle
Track layout
Location

80th Avenue/Tinley Park is one of two commuter railroad stations along Metra's Rock Island District Line in Tinley Park, Illinois. The station is officially located on 18001 South 80th Avenue, lies 25.1 miles (40.4 km) away from LaSalle Street Station, the northern terminus of the line. Parking is available on both sides of the tracks. On the north side, where the station house resides, it is available in the east or west parking lots. On the south side, it is available in the Timber Road parking lot.

As of October 2025, 80th Avenue is the tenth busiest of Metra's 236 non-downtown stations, with an average of 1,210 weekday boardings.

As of 2022, 80th Avenue is served by 48 trains (24 in each direction) on weekdays, by 21 trains (10 inbound, 11 outbound) on Saturdays, and by 16 trains (eight in each direction) on Sundays and holidays. On weekdays, three inbound trains originate from 80th Avenue, and three outbound trains terminate at 80th Avenue.

== Train schedule ==
The full train schedule can be found on Metra's website. There are 68 trains from this station on weekdays, 20 on Saturday and 16 on Sunday.

All inbound trains to Chicago that stop at 80th Avenue, run to the terminus of the line; LaSalle Street Station. All outbound trains that stop at 80th Avenue, with the exception of train #413, run to Joliet. Train #413 terminates at the New Lenox station.

== Tracks ==
There are two tracks at Tinley Park–80th Avenue. Trains from Chicago run on track 2 (the north track) and trains to Chicago run on track 1 (the south track.)

== Station amenities ==
The station has a waiting room that is open from 4 a.m. through 4 p.m. A ticket agent is on duty from 5 a.m. until 12:45 p.m. during the week.

== Renovation ==
Recent analyses of financing arrangements for Tinley Park's new 80th Avenue train station have resulted in some delays in the original construction schedule, but the Village is now moving forward with design plans.

The project has been undergoing a close financial analysis to determine the amount of funding necessary to build the type of facility that is desired at that location. The earliest estimate for bidding procedures to begin on the project is the first quarter of 2010. Start of construction is dependent on how soon acceptable funding sources are identified.

Funding for the new facility will come from a variety of sources, including Metra, the Village of Tinley Park, and federal grants obtained by U. S. Rep. Judy Biggert (R-Ill). Rep. Biggert announced that an additional $500,000 in federal funding has been secured, amounting to more than $1.2 million in federal money targeted for project.

The Village will fund various construction upgrades. However, due to recent budgetary constraints brought on by the weak economy, the amount of those upgrades will be limited to available funds.

== Incidents ==
- On March 10, 2008, a commuter was killed at the station after jumping in front of an inbound Metra train to Chicago, Illinois.
- On November 15, 2013, a pedestrian was struck and killed by an inbound Metra train. Soon after, the death was ruled as a suicide and the man was identified as a fifth-grade teacher who was employed at School District 146 in Tinley Park, Illinois.
