= Patrick Sheehan (Illinois politician) =

American politician in Illinois

Member of the Illinois House of Representatives from the 37th district
- Incumbent
- Assumed office April 12, 2024
- Preceded by: Tim Ozinga

Personal details
- Party: Republican
- Profession: Police officer

Patrick Sheehan is an American politician who has served as a Republican member of the Illinois House of Representatives since April 12, 2024. Sheehan represents the 37th district which includes all or portions of Frankfort, Homer Glen, Joliet, Lockport, Mokena, New Lenox, Orland Park, and Tinley Park.

== Early life and career ==
Sheehan was a law enforcement officer for nearly 20 years. He served as an alderman on the Lockport City Council and a park commissioner on the Lockport Township Park District. In the 2022 Illinois Senate election, Sheehan was the Republican nominee for the 19th Illinois Senate district. He lost to Democratic incumbent Michael Hastings.

== Legislative career ==
On April 8, 2024, Tim Ozinga, who was first elected to the Illinois House of Representatives from the 37th district in 2020, announced his resignation effective that day. The Republican Representative Committee of the 37th Representative District, chaired by Ozinga in his capacity as chairman of the Will County Republican Party, appointed Patrick Sheehan to fill the vacancy. Sheehan took the oath of office on April 12, 2024. During the 103rd General Assembly, he was assigned to the following committees: Appropriations—Public Safety; Counties & Townships; Elementary & Secondary Education: Administration, Licensing & Charter Schools; Energy & Environment; Ethics & Elections; Restorative Justice; and Revenue & Finance. Sheehan won election to a full term in November 2024.

In 2026, Sheehan was elected to the Illinois Republican State Central Committee by a weighted vote of elected precinct committeemen in Illinois's 1st congressional district.
