= Tim Ozinga =

American politician (born 1986/1987)

Member of the Illinois House of Representatives from the 37th district
- In office January 5, 2021 – April 8, 2024
- Preceded by: Margo McDermed
- Succeeded by: Patrick Sheehan

Personal details
- Born: 1986 or 1987 (age 39–40)
- Party: Republican
- Spouse: Amanda (m. 2009)
- Children: 4
- Education: Trinity Christian College (BS); Northwestern University (MBA)
- Occupation: Business Owner

Tim Ozinga (born 1986/1987) is an American politician who was a Republican member of the Illinois House from the 37th district from 2021 to 2024. The 37th district, located in the Chicago area, includes parts of Frankfort, Frankfort Square, Homer Glen, Joliet, Lockport, Mokena, New Lenox, Orland Park, Orland Hills, and Tinley Park.

== Early life, education, and career ==
Tim Ozinga grew up in Mokena, Illinois. He attended Moraine Valley Community College and would attend Trinity Christian College, where he would earn a B.S. in business management and political science. Before earning his B.S., Ozinga took a short academic break to work on his father's congressional campaign in 2008. He earned an MBA from Kellogg School of Management and "completed the executive education program at Harvard Business School."

Ozinga is currently the co-owner and executive vice-president of Ozinga Bros, Inc., a "fourth-generation family business specializing in building materials and logistics" since 1928. Ozinga formerly served on the technology committee in Mokena, Illinois, as well as a commissioner on the economic development commission. He currently serves as board secretary for the Mokena Community Park District.

Ozinga is a member of the Illinois Republican Party's Central Committee as a representative from the Illinois's 1st congressional district He served as Chairman of the Will County Republican Party from 2022 to 2024.

== Illinois House of Representatives ==
In the 2020 general election, Ozinga was elected to succeed fellow Republican and retiring Representative Margo McDermed. After the election, McDermed resigned several days before the end of her term in the 101st General Assembly. The Republican Representative Committee of the Republican Party of the 37th Representative District appointed Representative-elect Ozinga to serve the remainder of McDermed's term. He was sworn into office on January 5, 2021.

As of July 3, 2022, Ozinga is a member of the following Illinois House committees:

On April 8, 2024, Ozinga announced his resignation effective that day. Patrick Sheehan, the Republican nominee in 2022 for State Senate, was appointed to succeed him.

- Appropriations - Public Safety Committee (HAPP)
- Clean Energy Subcommittee (HENG-CLEA)
- Energy & Environment Committee (HENG)
- Ethics & Elections Committee (SHEE)
- Housing Committee (SHOU)
- Revenue & Finance Committee (HREF)
- Sales, Amusements, & Other Taxes Subcommittee (HREF-SATX)

== Electoral history ==
Illinois 37th State House District Republican Primary, 2020
Party	Candidate	Votes	%
Republican	Tim Ozinga	5,862	100.0
Total votes		5,862	100.0

Illinois 37th State House District General Election, 2020
Party	Candidate	Votes	%
Republican	Tim Ozinga	41,115	63.67
Democratic	Michelle Fadeley	23,465	36.33
Total votes		64,580	100.0
Republican hold			
