= Tinley Park Public Library =

Library in Illinois, United States

Coordinates: 41.561752°N 87.810470°W

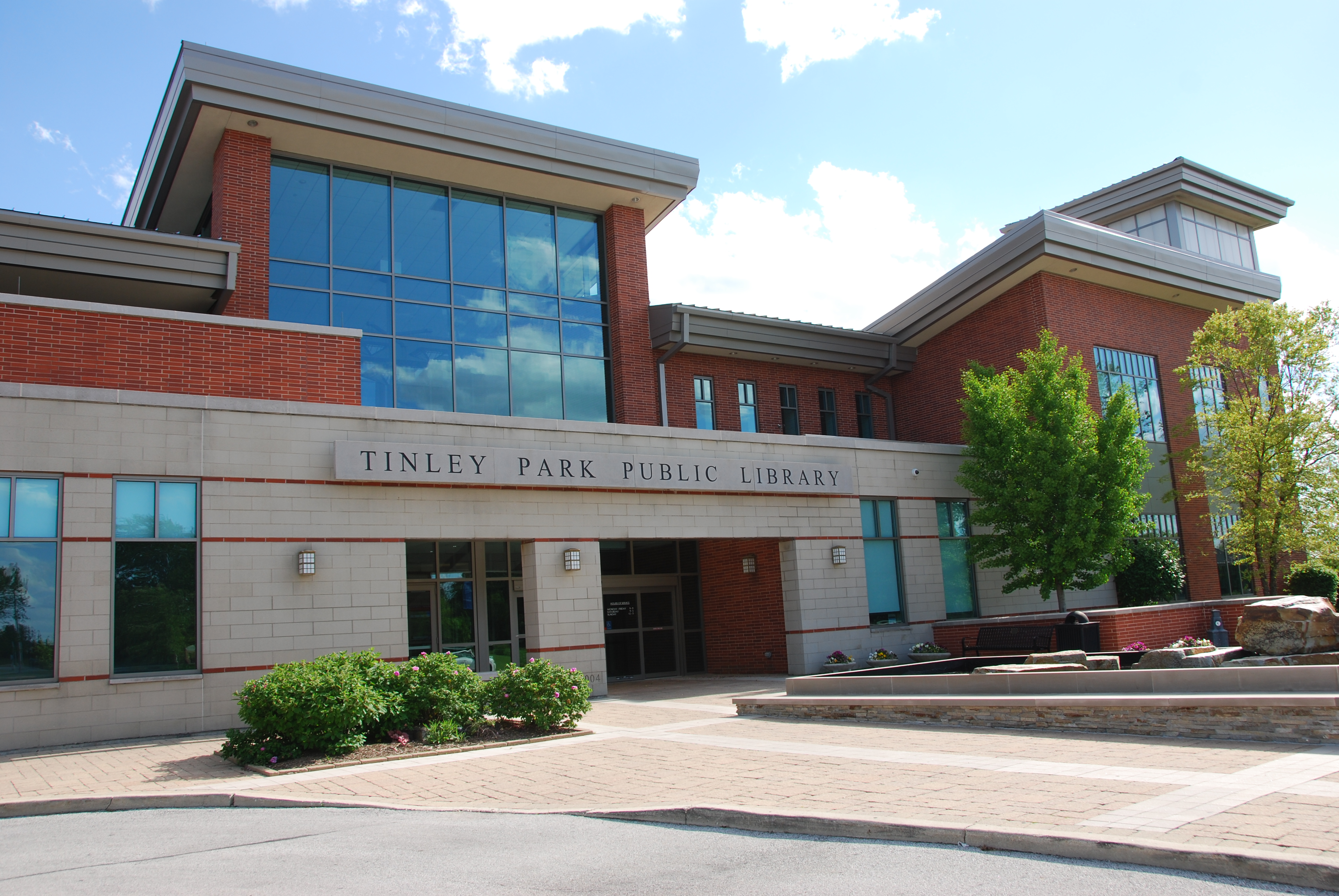
- Main entrance
- Location: 7851 Timber Drive; Tinley Park, Illinois, United States
- Type: Public
- Established: 1956

Collection
- Size: 227,097

Other information
- Website: www.tplibrary.org

The Tinley Park Public Library serves the communities of Tinley Park and Orland Hills, Illinois. The building has 58,700 square feet of space, and as of May 2018, houses 116,637 books, 12,911 videos/DVDs, 14,118 audio recordings, 270 print serials, 1,754 video games, and 83,407 children's holdings. Additionally, the library subscribes to 64 databases, and circulated 696,753 items to cardholders during FY 2017-2018.

== History ==
The Tinley Park Public Library's history dates back to 1956, when a temporary building, provided by George Hartman, was erected at 6871 W. 171st Street, a site donated by the Tinley Development Co. In 1957, the Friends of the Library group was formed to help support the operations of the library. The original, temporary building was replaced with a new building in 1959. At that time, the library— staffed entirely by volunteers and maintained by donations— had seating room for 18 persons.

In 1966, the Tinley Park Library became a member of the Suburban Library System, and in 1974 a new library building opened at 17101 71st Ave. The building contained 25,000 square feet of space, but only the upper floor was used initially. The lower level opened to the public in 1982, when it was dedicated as the new Children's department. This building housed the library's collections for forty years, until the current site at 7851 Timber Drive opened in 2004.
