= Oak Forest, Illinois =

- City
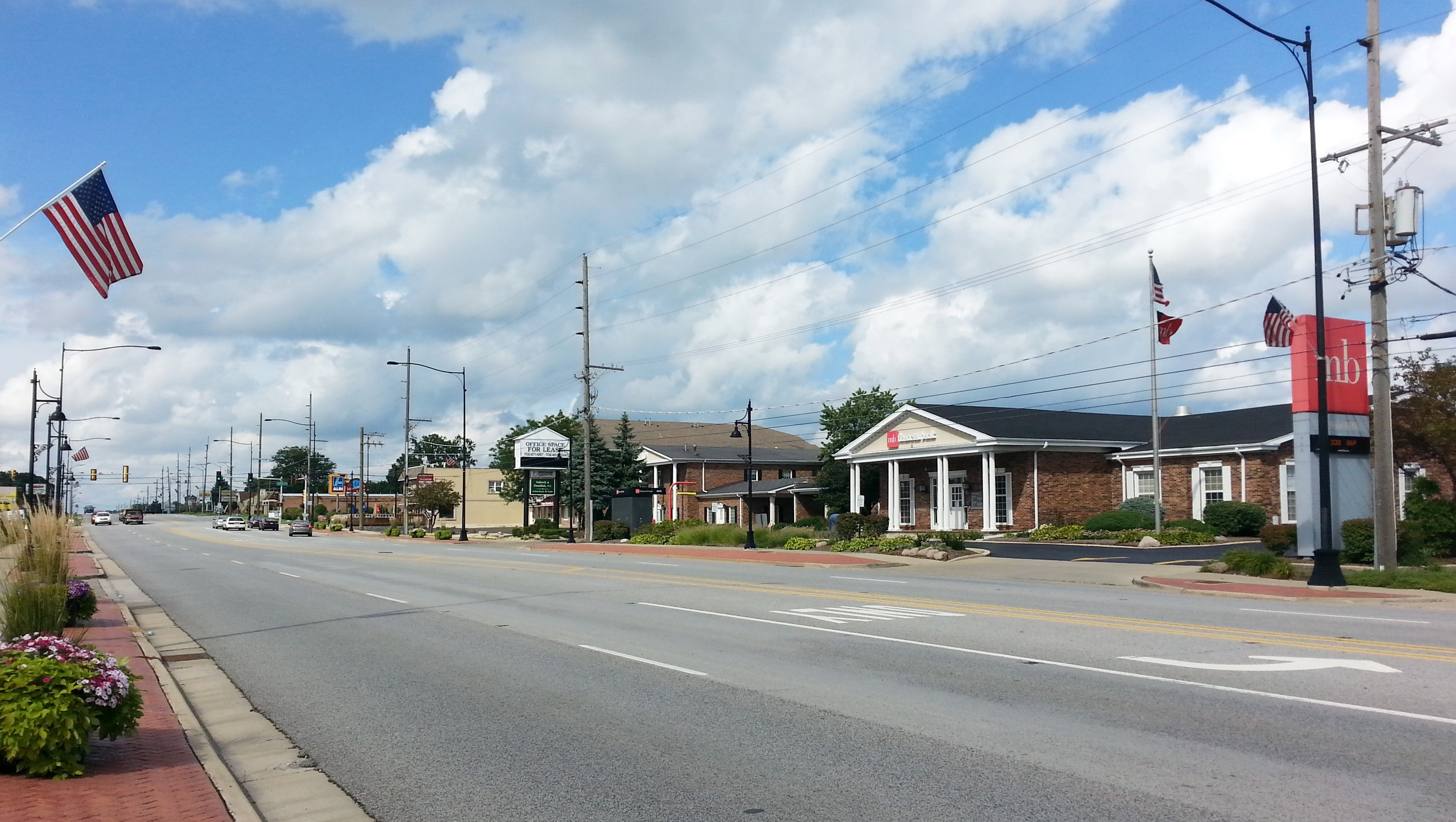
- Cicero Avenue in Oak Forest

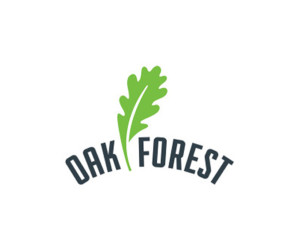
- Flag logo
- Motto: All Good Things Close To Home
- Location of Oak Forest in Cook County, Illinois

- Location within Greater Chicago Location within Illinois Location within the United States
- Coordinates: 41°36′27″N 87°45′2″W
- Country: United States
- State: Illinois
- County: Cook
- Township: Bremen
- Incorporated: 1800

Government
  - Type: Mayor–council
  - Mayor: Zac Maher

Area
  - Total: 6.07 sq mi (15.72 km^{2})
  - Land: 6.02 sq mi (15.60 km^{2})
  - Water: 0.046 sq mi (0.12 km^{2}) 0.83%

Population (2020)
  - Total: 27,478
  - Density: 4,563.4/sq mi (1,761.94/km^{2})

Standard of living (2009–11)
  - Per capita income: $26,199
  - Median home value: $216,200
- ZIP code(s): 60452
- Area code(s): 708
- Geocode: 54638
- FIPS code: 17-54638
- Website: www.oak-forest.org

Oak Forest is a city in Cook County, Illinois, United States. The city is out 24 miles (39 km) south-southwest of downtown Chicago in Bremen Township. Per the 2020 census, the population was 27,478.

== History ==
Human habitation in Oak Forest began during the early Holocene. This is made evident by the remains of hunting camps on what would become the grounds of the city's hospital. Several millennia later, the final known indigenous settlement in Oak Forest, a Potawatomi longhouse village, was established nearby. However, it was abandoned by the 1620s.

The origins of present-day Oak Forest begins with a railroad whistle stop on the Chicago, Rock Island and Pacific Railroad 1 block south of the intersection of 167th street and Central Avenue which primarily served area dairy farmers. This stop was located in a largely forested area of what was previously known as the Cooper's Grove Stand of Timber. By the 1880s this particular area of timber was being referred to as the "Oak Forest" due to its abundance of oak trees. A section of the former "Cooper's Grove Road" paralleling the railroad track from 66th Court to 167th Street in Tinley Park became known as "Oak Forest Avenue", because it was the road from the Village of Bremen/New Bremen (now Tinley Park) that lead to this "Oak Forest".

In 1907, Cook County approved construction of a second county poor farm and infirmary on a site generally at the southeast corner of 159th Street and Cicero Avenue to address overcrowding conditions at the County Poor Farm in Dunning on the northwest side of Chicago. This location was very near the Rock Island railroad and a new railroad station was constructed northwest of the present day intersection of 159th Street (US Route 6) and Cicero Avenue (Illinois Route 50), which provided convenient rail access to the facility. A railroad spur off of the Rock Island railroad line was also constructed onto the Oak Forest Hospital site that was used for both delivery of materials during its construction and delivery of coal for its heating plant and other goods used at the facility for many years. The Oak Forest Infirmary opened in 1910. Shortly after its opening, the facility accommodated close to 2,000 people suffering from poverty, mental illness, alcoholism, and other problems. The residents of the Infirmary helped maintain farmlands at and around the facility. By 1932, the Infirmary was serving more than 4,000 patients, including over 500 with tuberculosis. From 1911-1971, over 90,000 indigent and unidentified deceased people of Cook County were buried in the potter's field near the Oak Forest Hospital.

Over the ensuing years following the opening of the Oak Forest Infirmary, a small settlement developed near both the railroad stop and the Oak Forest Infirmary populated by both workers at the facility and relatives of individuals in the Oak Forest facility. By the 1920s there were several residential subdivisions developing near the facility. The 1940 census reflected 611 residents outside the hospital. The hospital provided other business opportunities. For example, several mortuaries/funeral homes were to be found just outside the facility.

In the 1930s, there were some efforts made to rename the community "Arbor Park". The proposed name did not gain much momentum, but the name did become memorialized in the name of the Arbor Park School District 145. In 1947, with a population of 1,618, the residents voted to incorporate as the Village of Oak Forest. It was reincorporated as a city in 1971.

Christian Goesel and several relatives settled near 147th and Oak Park Avenue (then Bachelor's Grove Road) beginning in about 1861. In 1884, the Goeselville post office was established (replacing the East Orland Post Office) to continue to serve the small settlement in that general vicinity (which had previously been part of the larger area of the earlier Batchelor Grove settlement). This post office operated as a satellite of the New Bremen/Tinley Park post office until it was discontinued in 1903. At its peak there were about 30 residents in the Goeselville area, with a few general stores to supply the farmers. Parts of the former Goeselville settlement are now within the far northwestern boundaries of the City of Oak Forest. Although that post office has been closed for over 100 years, the Goeselville name occasionally continues to be found on current maps.

== Geography ==
Oak Forest is part of the Chicago metropolitan area. It is mostly surrounded by Cook County Forest Preserves (hence the name). Some neighboring communities of Oak Forest include Crestwood to the north, Midlothian to the northeast, Markham to the east, Country Club Hills to the southeast, Tinley Park to the southwest, Orland Park to the west, and beyond Bachelor's Grove Cemetery and Forest Preserve is Palos Heights to the northwest.

According to the 2021 census gazetteer files, Oak Forest has a total area of 6.07 square miles (15.72 km^{2}), of which 6.02 square miles (15.59 km^{2}) (or 99.21%) is land and 0.05 square miles (0.13 km^{2}) (or 0.79%) is water.

=== Wards ===
The City of Oak Forest is split into 7 wards and each ward is represented by an Alderman.

Wards of Oak Forest

== Demographics ==
Historical population
Census	Pop.	Note	%±
1950	1,856		—
1960	3,724		100.6%
1970	19,271		417.5%
1980	25,040		29.9%
1990	26,203		4.6%
2000	28,051		7.1%
2010	27,962		−0.3%
2020	27,478		−1.7%
U.S. Decennial Census; 2010 2020

=== Racial and ethnic composition ===
Oak Forest city, Illinois – Racial and ethnic composition Note: the US Census treats Hispanic/Latino as an ethnic category. This table excludes Latinos from the racial categories and assigns them to a separate category. Hispanics/Latinos may be of any race.
Race / Ethnicity (NH = Non-Hispanic)	Pop 2000	Pop 2010	Pop 2020	% 2000	% 2010	% 2020
White alone (NH)	24,297	21,445	18,606	86.62%	76.69%	67.71%
Black or African American alone (NH)	1,006	1,248	2,012	3.59%	4.46%	7.32%
Native American or Alaska Native alone (NH)	30	29	67	0.11%	0.10%	0.24%
Asian alone (NH)	736	1,076	1,313	2.62%	3.85%	4.78%
Pacific Islander alone (NH)	4	1	3	0.01%	0.00%	0.01%
Other race alone (NH)	13	33	121	0.05%	0.12%	0.44%
Mixed race or Multiracial (NH)	320	377	815	1.14%	1.35%	2.97%
Hispanic or Latino (any race)	1,645	3,753	4,541	5.86%	13.42%	16.53%
Total	28,051	27,962	27,478	100.00%	100.00%	100.00%

=== 2020 census ===
As of the 2020 census, Oak Forest had a population of 27,478. The population density was 4,527.60 inhabitants per square mile (1,748.12/km^{2}). There were 10,750 housing units at an average density of 1,771.30 per square mile (683.90/km^{2}), and 100.0% of residents lived in urban areas while 0.0% lived in rural areas.

There were 10,409 households and 7,219 families in Oak Forest. Of all households, 30.9% had children under the age of 18 living in them, 51.7% were married-couple households, 17.1% were households with a male householder and no spouse or partner present, and 25.1% were households with a female householder and no spouse or partner present. About 24.9% of all households were made up of individuals and 10.5% had someone living alone who was 65 years of age or older.

The median age was 39.5 years; 21.6% of residents were under the age of 18, 8.7% were from 18 to 24, 23.2% were from 25 to 44, 30.2% were from 45 to 64, and 16.0% were 65 years of age or older. For every 100 females there were 98.0 males, and for every 100 females age 18 and over there were 94.6 males.

There were 10,750 housing units, of which 3.2% were vacant. The homeowner vacancy rate was 0.7% and the rental vacancy rate was 5.5%.

Racial composition as of the 2020 census
Race	Number	Percent
White	19,674	71.6%
Black or African American	2,065	7.5%
American Indian and Alaska Native	161	0.6%
Asian	1,325	4.8%
Native Hawaiian and Other Pacific Islander	6	0.0%
Some other race	1,816	6.6%
Two or more races	2,431	8.8%
Hispanic or Latino (of any race)	4,541	16.5%

=== Income ===
The median income for a household in the city was $78,865, and the median income for a family was $94,225. Males had a median income of $49,488 versus $35,735 for females. The per capita income for the city was $35,289. About 2.8% of families and 4.6% of the population were below the poverty line, including 4.7% of those under age 18 and 6.2% of those age 65 or over.

== Arts and culture ==
From 1987 to 2019 the city hosted Oak Fest. The festival, held in early July, featured music, carnival attractions, fireworks and more. In 2020 the commission responsible for the event dissolved and announced that after 32 years, Oak Fest would not continue.

== Education ==
Public grade school districts in Oak Forest include Forest Ridge School District 142, Arbor Park School District 145, and Tinley Park Community Consolidated School District 146.

The city also includes one parochial Pre-K through 8 elementary school, St. Damian School, named for its connection to Oak Forest Hospital.

Oak Forest is home to Oak Forest High School, one of four high schools in Bremen Community High School District 228. Some of Oak Forest feeds into Tinley Park High School. A portion of Oak Forest west of Ridgeland Avenue feeds into Victor J. Andrew High School. A small portion of Oak Forest feeds into Carl Sandburg High School.

Oak Forest is part of Community College District 510 (South Suburban College). Higher education is also readily available at the South Suburban College University and College Center, and there are branches of University of St. Francis, Chicago State University, Governors State University and Illinois Institute of Technology.

== Notable places ==
- Oak Forest Hospital of Cook County, a large hospital specializing in long-term care and some other varieties of care
- Bachelor's Grove Cemetery, near Oak Forest in the Rubio Forest Preserve

== Politics ==
Most of Oak Forest is part of Illinois's 1st congressional district and is represented in the U.S. House of Representatives by Democrat Jonathan Jackson. Some very small areas totaling under 0.05 square miles (100,000 m^{2}) at the city's southeast edge are in the 2nd district.

Oak Forest is a part of three state legislative districts of the Illinois General Assembly. The 14th senate/28th house district, which lies west of Central Ave. and north of 159th St., the 15th senate/30th house district, which lies east of Central Ave., and the 19th senate/38th house district, which lies west of Long Ave. and south of 159th St. These districts are represented by state senators Emil Jones, III, Napoleon Harris, and Michael Hastings; and representatives Robert Rita, William Davis, and Al Riley, respectively.

== Transportation ==
Oak Forest is served by U.S. Route 6 (159th Street) and Illinois Route 50 (Cicero Avenue). Central Avenue serves as a sort of Main Street for Oak Forest, where the local Jewel-Osco, Food 4 Less, post office, Acorn Public Library, Oak Forest Park District, Police Station/Fire Department/City Hall, and Oak Forest High School are all located.

Interstate 57 crosses the southeast corner of Oak Forest, just north of its intersection with Interstate 80. Exit 346 on I-57 (167th Street) is the closest access point, while Exit 348 (U.S. Route 6) is just to the east, across Pulaski Road/Crawford Avenue. The Tri-State Tollway (I-294) is also accessible a few miles east of Oak Forest.

Pace (transit) bus route 354 runs from Harvey down 147th and Central Avenue through Oak Forest to Tinley Park. Pace bus route 364 runs from Hammond, Indiana, to Orland Square Mall in Orland Park down 159th Street (U.S. Route 6) through Oak Forest and other south suburbs. Pace bus route 383 runs down Cicero Avenue (Illinois Route 50) from Chicago Midway International Airport in the south side of Chicago to 159th Street at Oak Forest Hospital.

The Oak Forest station of the Metra commuter rail line, located at 159th and Cicero, is a popular option for commuters to Chicago. This station is part of the Rock Island District Metra line that runs between Joliet and the LaSalle Street Station in the Chicago Loop.

== Recent developments ==
=== Gateway Project ===
In spring 2005, Mayor Patrick M. Gordon with the assistance from ZPDA, Baxter and Woodman and city staff announced plans for a "Gateway Project", consisting of a mixed-use commercial and residential development at the corner of Illinois Route 50 (Cicero Avenue) and 159th Street. The project is said to provide the community with a transit-oriented development at the METRA commuter rail line. The development was promoted by the mayor as greatly enhancing the tax base of the city and generating additional commercial interest in the Cicero Avenue Corridor.

In 2008, the city broke ground on the Gateway Development at the northwest corner of 159th Street and Cicero Avenue. Construction of the mixed-use development will bring more than 50,000 square feet (5,000 m^{2}) of new retail and restaurant space and approximately 80 residential units to the city. By 2012, the Gateway Project still had the same two buildings built in 2008. In 2016, a two unit building was added.

=== Fresenius Medical Care Center ===
In June 2012 a developer proposed to the city council to develop the Fresenius Medical Care Center. Later that month, the city council approved it to be developed. The city council chose a suitable location for it, near 159th on Lorel Avenue. The Medical Center is to serve as a kidney dialysis center. In October 2012, the builder Net3 Real Estate bought the land for $270,000. Later that month, the builder broke ground. The center is due to be complete in spring 2013.

== Notable people ==
- Robbie Avila, current basketball player at Saint Louis University; graduate of Oak Forest High School (2022)
- Tim Byrdak, former Major League baseball pitcher for the New York Mets and Kansas City Royals; graduate of Oak Forest High School (1991)
- Tevin Coleman, NFL running back for the New York Jets; graduate of Oak Forest High School
- Jason Frasor, former Major League baseball pitcher for the Kansas City Royals and Chicago White Sox; graduate of Oak Forest High School (1995)
- Virginia Frederick, Illinois state representative
- Tom Gorzelanny, former Major League Baseball pitcher for the Pittsburgh Pirates and Chicago Cubs, grew up in Oak Forest
- Lee Martin, Pulitzer Prize Finalist and author of The Bright Forever lived in Oak Forest and attended Kimberly Heights Elementary and Arbor Park Middle School from 1963 until 1969
- Chris Medina, competed on 2011 American Idol; lived in Oak Forest
- Bob O'Dekirk, Former Mayor of Joliet, Illinois
- Garry Meier, Chicago radio personality; lived in Oak Forest
- Jimmy Pardo, comedian and host of the podcast Never Not Funny; graduate of Oak Forest High School (1984)
- Rick Paulas, writer; born in Oak Forest
- Paul Runge, serial killer
- George Saunders, short story writer and essayist; graduate of Oak Forest High School
- Lisa Joann Thompson, dancer, actress, choreographer (In Living Color, Fame L.A., and Motown Live)
- Rick Gorecki, former Major League baseball pitcher for the Los Angeles Dodgers and Tampa Bay Devil Rays; graduate of Oak Forest High School (1991)
