= John J. Szaton =

Polish-American sculptor (1907–1966)

John J. Szaton (1907, in Ludlow, Massachusetts – 1966) was a Polish-American sculptor.

== Career ==
Szaton apprenticed under well-known Illinois sculptor Lorado Taft, who invited Szaton to come to Chicago after meeting him on a lecture tour of various high schools and art schools in Massachusetts. Szaton, who became known for his sculpture, studied at the Art Institute of Chicago and at the now-defunct National Academy of Art in Chicago. He also worked on project for Taft and other artists, including the Lincoln Trail State Memorial by Nellie Walker, his wife's aunt. Szaton also exhibited with the Polish Arts Club of Chicago

During the 1940s, Szaton created several other sculptures: a War Memorial (1940) at the Northwest Armory, Chicago; Indian Shooting the Stars (1947) for Lane Tech High School, Chicago, as a tribute to students who died in World War II; and Now I Lay Me Down to Sleep (1947) for Cedar Park Cemetery, Calumet Park, Illinois. Szaton continued to work at Taft's studio until it disbanded in 1947, then moved his family to Tinley Park, at that time a small rural suburb of Chicago, and commuted to Chicago to work during the week as a greeting card engraver; income from art commissions was not sufficient to sustain his family. In 1948 Szaton built a large, vaulted-ceiling garage studio behind his home and continued to work on art projects.

== The Coal Miner ==
In 1963, Szaton collaborated with artist Vachel Davis to reinterpret Davis's iconic 1946 painting American Coal Miner into a permanent, sculptural memorial to coal miners. Szaton's 7-ft. bronze statue, The Coal Miner, is displayed on the lawn of the Illinois State Capitol in Springfield. It was dedicated on October 16, 1964, and became his most widely known sculpture. A second The Coal Miner statue, cast in 1966, is installed on the west side of the Indiana Statehouse and was dedicated in 1967.

== Death ==
Szaton died in 1966, and is buried in Cedar Park Cemetery, Calumet Park, Illinois.
