= Coal Miner (statue) =

Statue by John J. Szaton

- Artist: John J. Szaton
- Medium: Bronze sculpture
- Dimensions: 220 cm × 67 cm × 71 cm (85 in × 26.5 in × 28 in)
- Location: Springfield, Illinois (original); Indianapolis, Indiana (copy); 39°46′8.33″N 86°9′47.3″W (copy)
- Owner: State of Illinois and State of Indiana

Coal Miner is a public artwork by Polish American artist John J. Szaton (1907–1966) which is located in two US state capitals; the original, commissioned in 1963 in Springfield, Illinois, as well as a copy on the west lawn of the Indiana State House in Indianapolis, Indiana. The statues commemorate coal miners who had lost their lives in those states' mining industries. The 7-foot (2.1 m) tall statue rests on a 3-foot (0.91 m) square, granite base supported by a cement foundation that is 4–6 inches (100–150 mm) thick.

== Historical information ==
=== Illinois ===
The Coal Miner statue was originally commissioned in 1963 by the State of Illinois, after 15 years of advocacy work by coal miner, artist, and poet Vachel Davis (1898–1966). The Illinois legislature appropriated $15,000 for the construction and casting of a memorial to Illinois coal miners. Davis, who was acquainted with artist John J. Szaton, recommended that he submit a sketch for the monument based on Davis's 1946 painting American Coal Miner. The legislature accepted Szaton's initial sketch. After submitting an 18-inch (460 mm) model of the sculpture, which was approved, Szaton received a contract to create the full-scale piece. Szaton created a full-scale plaster sculpture in his Tinley Park studio before casting the statue in bronze. The plaster sculpture is still able to be viewed in the Tinley Park Historical Society Museum. The sculpture, dedicated in Illinois in 1964, was intended to commemorate the Illinois coal miners who had been killed in the state's coal mines. It is installed on the north end of the Illinois State Capitol's lawn in Springfield, Illinois, and faces Second Street. The dedication ceremony took place on October 16, 1964, with speeches from Illinois governor Otto Kerner, Jr. and Paul Powell, former speaker of the Illinois House of Representatives. Michael F. Widman Jr. represented the United Mine Workers of America at the dedication ceremony, standing in for John L. Lewis, president of the United Mine Workers, who was ill and unable to attend. A letter from Lewis commended the State of Illinois for being the first to honor their coal miners with such a memorial. A plaque was added in 1981 citing Szaton as its sculptor. The Illinois statue is owned and administered by the State of Illinois.

=== Indiana ===
In 1965 the Indiana General Assembly appropriated funds to commission a copy of the sculpture to memorialize Hoosier coal miners who had been killed on the job. The Indiana statue was dedicated in 1967. As with the Illinois sculpture, it is a public artwork. Indiana's statue of The Coal Miner is owned and administered by the State of Indiana, Department of Administration.

Szaton's wife donated the full-scale plaster sculpture to the Tinley Park Historical Society in 1986.

Reproductions of small-scale versions of the monument have been mass-produced; over 200 have been given as gifts by the coal industry over the years.

== Artist ==
John J. Szaton was born in 1907 in Ludlow, Massachusetts. He apprenticed under well-known Illinois sculptor Lorado Taft, who invited Szaton to come to Chicago after meeting him on a lecture tour of various high schools and art schools in Massachusetts. Szaton, who became known for his sculpture, studied at the Art Institute of Chicago and at the now-defunct National Academy of Art in Chicago. He also worked on project for Taft and other artists, including the Lincoln Trail State Memorial by Nellie Walker, his wife's aunt. During the 1940s Szaton created several other sculptures: a War Memorial (1940) at the Northwest Armory, Chicago; Indian Shooting the Stars (1947) for Lane Tech High School, Chicago, as a tribute to students who died in World War II; and Now I Lay Me Down to Sleep (1947) for Cedar Park Cemetery, Calumet Park, Illinois. Szaton continued to work at Taft's studio until it disbanded in 1947, then moved his family to Tinley Park, at that time a small rural suburb of Chicago, and commuted to Chicago to work during the week as a greeting card engraver; income from art commissions was not sufficient to sustain his family. In 1948 Szaton built a large, vaulted-ceiling garage studio behind his home and continued to work on art projects.

In 1963 Szaton collaborated with artist Vachel Davis to reinterpret Davis's iconic 1946 painting American Coal Miner into a permanent, sculptural memorial to coal miners. Szaton's 7-ft. bronze statue, The Coal Miner, is displayed on the lawn of the Illinois State Capitol in Springfield. It was dedicated on October 16, 1964, and became his most widely known sculpture. A second The Coal Miner statue, cast in 1966, is installed on the west side of the Indiana Statehouse and was dedicated in 1967. Szaton died in 1966 and is buried in Cedar Park Cemetery, Calumet Park, Illinois.

== Statue ==
=== Process ===
The statue was first sculpted in plaster and then cast in bronze to create the Illinois statue, which was dedicated in 1964; the Indiana statue was cast later, in 1966, and dedicated in 1967. Both statues were cast at the Spampinato Art Workshop foundry in Chicago.

=== Description ===
The Coal Miner, which measures 85 by 26 1/2 by 28 inches (2,160 mm × 670 mm × 710 mm), is installed in the northwest corner of the Indiana Statehouse lawn and faces west. The figure wears overalls, boots, a belt, a long-sleeve shirt, and a miner's hat. He has a contrapposto stance with his proper left foot forward. He carries a miner's fire safety lamp, or "bug light", in his proper left hand, which is at his side. His proper right hand is raised, gripping the base of a miner's pick axe that rests on his proper right shoulder. The shirt-sleeve on his proper right arm is unbuttoned and hangs open on his forearm. The belt hanging at his waist has three visible belt punches. He wears a MSA Comfo Cap Model P miner's hat with its battery pack clipped to the backside of his belt. The artist's signature, "John Szaton, Sc." appears on the proper left side of the base, toward the front. On the proper left side of the base, toward the back, a foundry mark reads, "Cast by Spaminato [sic] Art Foundry Chicago, Ill. 1966".

The square, granite base measures 35 7/8 by 35 1/2 by 36 inches (910 mm × 900 mm × 910 mm). Its front-facing side has a bronze, bas-relief plaque depicting a drag-line mining crane at work in a strip mine. A cement foundation, 4 to 6 inches (100 to 150 mm) thick, supports the base.

The plaque on the rear-facing side reads:

Without coal the marvelous social and industrial progress which marks our civilization could not have been achieved. But the production of this vital commodity, so essential to the world's progress, has cost the lives of thousands of "coal miners" in Indiana. It is to the supreme sacrifice of these men that this memorial is dedicated.

=== Condition ===
The Indiana sculpture was assessed in November 1992 and added to the Smithsonian American Art Museum's Inventories of American Painting and Sculpture database. The statue was considered well maintained at the time of the assessment. Photos taken of the sculpture in 2005 show ample presence of lime scale, which was removed between late 2005 and October 2010.

== See also ==
- Workers' Memorial Sculpture
