= Oak Forest station =

Commuter rail station in Oak Forest, Illinois

Oak Forest

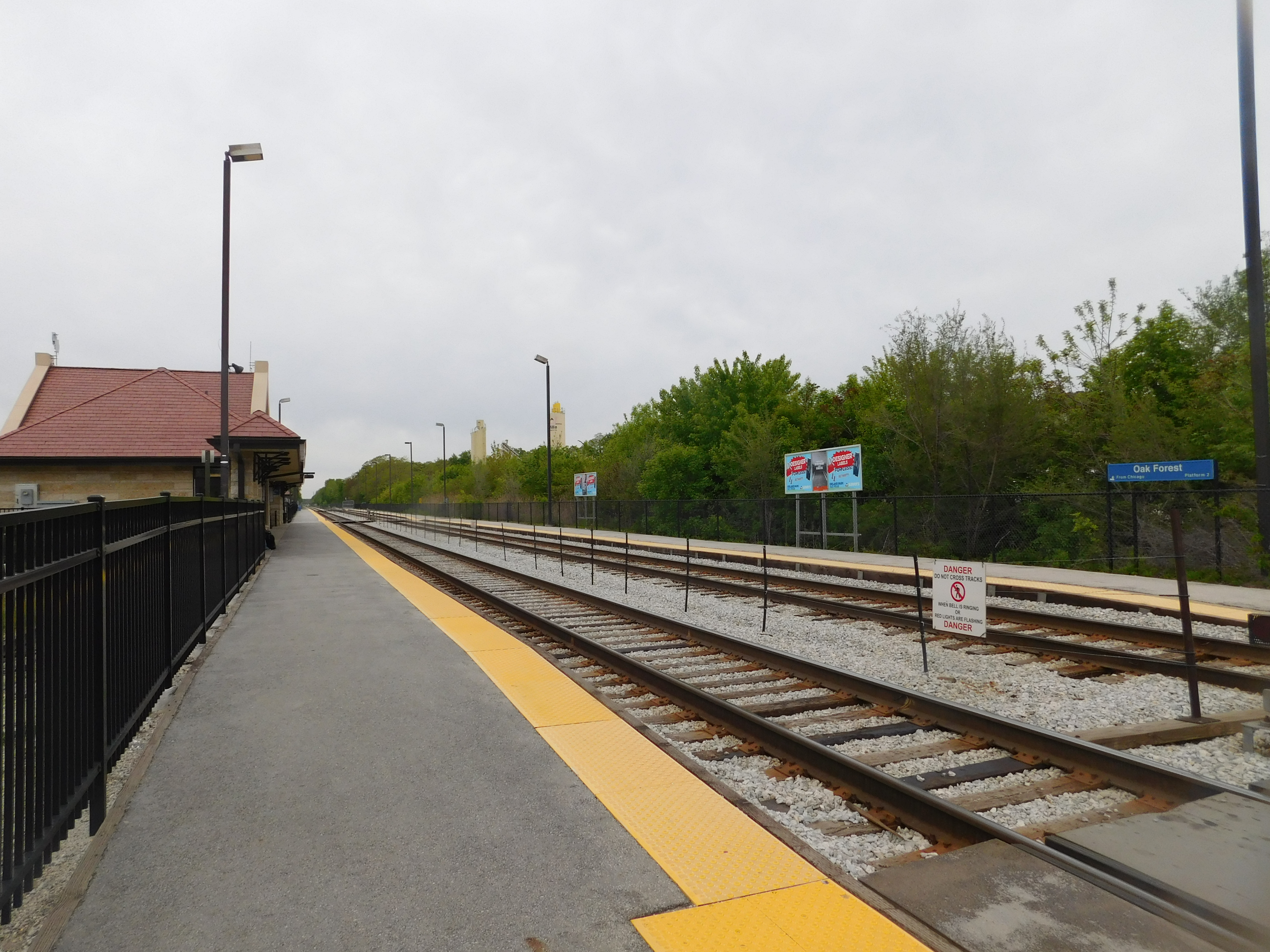
- Oak Forest station in May 2016

General information
- Location: 4850 West 159th Street; Oak Forest, Illinois
- Coordinates: 41.6043°N 87.7385°W
- Owner: Metra
- Line: Joliet Subdistrict
- Platforms: 2 side platforms
- Tracks: 2
- Connections: Pace Bus

Construction
- Parking: Yes
- Accessible: Yes

Other information
- Fare zone: 3

History
- Opened: 1900
- Rebuilt: 1950, 2013

Passengers
- 2018: 1,091 (average weekday) ▼4%
- Rank: 42 out of 236

Services
Preceding station	Metra	Following station
Tinley Park toward Joliet	Rock Island	Midlothian toward LaSalle
Former services
Preceding station	Chicago, Rock Island and Pacific Railroad	Following station
Tinley Park toward Joliet	Suburban Service	Midlothian toward Chicago
Track layout
Location

Oak Forest is a train station located in Oak Forest, Illinois on Metra's Rock Island District line, which runs between Joliet, Illinois and LaSalle Street Station in downtown Chicago, Illinois. It is in Zone 3 according to Metra fare schedules based on distance from downtown Chicago. As of 2018, Oak Forest is the 42nd busiest of Metra's 236 non-downtown stations, with an average of 1,091 weekday boardings.

As of 2022, Oak Forest is served by 42 trains (21 in each direction) on weekdays, by 21 trains (10 inbound, 11 outbound) on Saturdays, and by 16 trains (eight in each direction) on Sundays and holidays.

The station is located at 159th Street (U.S. Route 6) and Cicero Avenue (Illinois Route 50). There are several parking lots adjacent to the station, though they are being removed and relocated further away from the train station as part of Oak Forest Mayor JoAnn Kelly's Gateway Project.

In 2011, Oak Forest, then the second-busiest station on the Rock Island line with 1,500 daily commuters and 23 trains, received a $1.3 million grant from the United States Department of Transportation for modernization.

== Tracks ==
There are two tracks at Oak Forest. Trains from Chicago run on track 2 (the north track) and trains to Chicago run on track 1 (the south track.)

== Bus connections ==
Pace

- 354 Harvey/Oak Forest Loop
- 364 159th Street
- 383 South Cicero
