= Tinley Park station =

Commuter rail station in Tinley Park, Illinois

Tinley Park

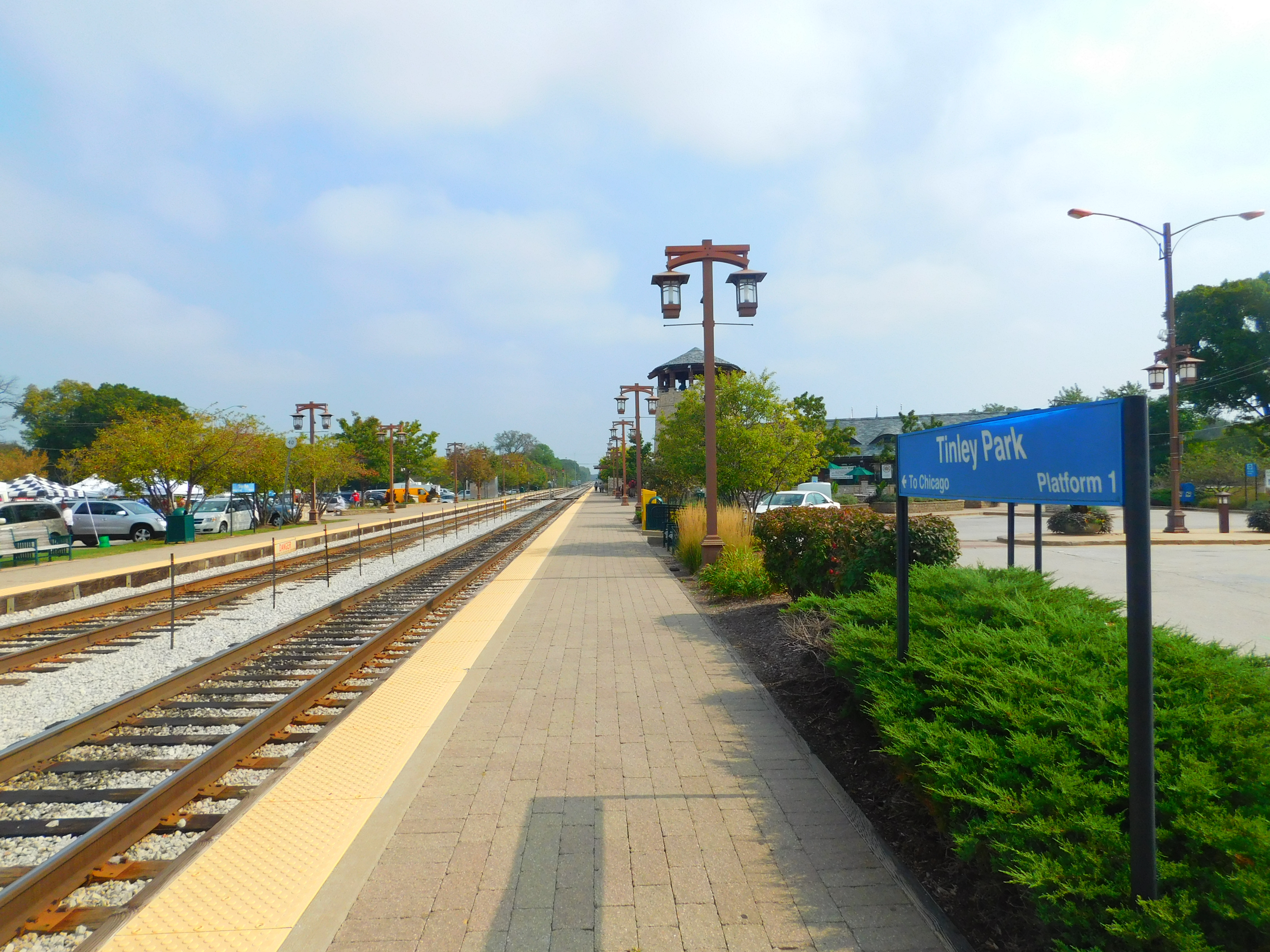
- Tinley Park station in September 2016

General information
- Location: 6700 South Street; Tinley Park, Illinois
- Coordinates: 41.5758°N 87.7828°W
- Owner: Metra
- Line: Joliet Subdistrict
- Platforms: 2 side platforms
- Tracks: 2
- Connections: Pace Bus

Construction
- Structure type: Above-ground station
- Parking: 738 spaces
- Cycle facilities: No
- Accessible: Yes

Other information
- Fare zone: 3

History
- Opened: 1890
- Rebuilt: 2002–2005

Passengers
- 2018: 917 (average weekday) ▼13.5%
- Rank: 57 out of 236

Services
Preceding station	Metra	Following station
80th Avenue/Tinley Park toward Joliet	Rock Island	Oak Forest toward LaSalle
Former services
Preceding station	Chicago, Rock Island and Pacific Railroad	Following station
Mokena toward Joliet	Suburban Service	Oak Forest toward Chicago
Track layout
Location

Tinley Park is a commuter railroad station along Metra's Rock Island District line in Tinley Park, Illinois. The station is 23.5 miles (37.8 km) from LaSalle Street Station, the northern terminus of the line. As of 2018, Tinley Park is the 57th busiest of Metra's 236 non-downtown stations, with an average of 917 weekday boardings.

The station is officially located at 6700 South Street between Oak Park Avenue and 66th Court, however parking is also available on the opposite side of the station along North Street between Oak Park Avenue and 67th Avenue, as well as the center of the block of Oak Park Avenue, 173rd Street, 67th Court and 172nd Street. A gravel lot on South Street, across from the station entrance, is used as temporary commuter parking for approximately 100 vehicles. A large transit-oriented development (TOD) is slated to replace the temporary parking spaces in early 2019.

As of 2022, Tinley Park is served by 42 trains (21 in each direction) on weekdays, by 21 trains (10 inbound, 11 outbound) on Saturdays, and by 16 trains (eight in each direction) on Sundays and holidays.

Tinley Park Metra's elaborate 3,600-square-foot (330 m^{2}) station features exterior stone, a roof, and wood rafters. A three-story clock tower offers views of Tinley Park and the adjacent Zabrocki Plaza, and contains Roman numerals engraved beneath four clocks in a circular fashion. It also contains an indoor/outdoor café that includes custom furnishings and internet jacks for laptop computers. Large glass windows provide a full view of the train tracks and promenade area. The station was honored by the American Institute of Architects as one of the 150 Great Places of Illinois.

== Tracks ==
There are two tracks at Tinley Park. Trains from Chicago run on track 2 (the north track) and trains to Chicago run on track 1 (the south track.)

== Bus connections ==
Pace

- 386 South Harlem
