= Orland Hills, Illinois =

- Village
- Flag Seal

- Location of Orland Hills in Cook County, Illinois.

- Location within Greater Chicago Location within Illinois Location within the United States
- Coordinates: 41°35′19″N 87°50′27″W
- Country: United States
- State: Illinois
- County: Cook
- Township: Orland
- Incorporated: June 30, 1961

Government
  - Type: Council–manager
  - Mayor: Kyle R. Hastings

Area
  - Total: 1.15 sq mi (2.98 km^{2})
  - Land: 1.14 sq mi (2.96 km^{2})
  - Water: 0.0077 sq mi (0.02 km^{2}) 0.87%

Population (2020)
  - Total: 6,893
  - Density: 6,021.6/sq mi (2,324.97/km^{2})
- Up 5.46% from 2000

Standard of living (2007-11)
  - Per capita income: $28,411
  - Median home value: $240,800
- ZIP code(s): 60487
- Area code(s): 708
- Geocode: 56627
- FIPS code: 17-56627
- Website: www.orlandhills.org

Orland Hills (formerly Westhaven) is a village in Cook County, Illinois, United States. Per the 2020 census, the population was 6,893, and as of 2022, the total number of households was 2,330.

== Geography ==
Orland Hills is located between Orland Park and Tinley Park. Orland Hills has two lakes: Lake Ashbourne and Lake Lorin. It is also home to Kelly Park.

According to the 2021 census gazetteer files, Orland Hills has a total area of 1.15 square miles (2.98 km^{2}), of which 1.15 square miles (2.98 km^{2}) (or 99.31%) is land and 0.01 square miles (0.03 km^{2}) (or 0.69%) is water.

== Demographics ==
Historical population
Census	Pop.	Note	%±
1970	470		—
1980	2,784		492.3%
1990	5,510		97.9%
2000	6,779		23.0%
2010	7,149		5.5%
2020	6,893		−3.6%
U.S. Decennial Census; 2010 2020

=== Racial and ethnic composition ===
Orland Hills village, Illinois – Racial and ethnic composition Note: the US Census treats Hispanic/Latino as an ethnic category. This table excludes Latinos from the racial categories and assigns them to a separate category. Hispanics/Latinos may be of any race.
Race / Ethnicity (NH = Non-Hispanic)	Pop 2000	Pop 2010	Pop 2020	% 2000	% 2010	% 2020
White alone (NH)	5,649	5,353	4,897	83.33%	74.88%	71.04%
Black or African American alone (NH)	345	538	604	5.09%	7.53%	8.76%
Native American or Alaska Native alone (NH)	10	9	4	0.15%	0.13%	0.06%
Asian alone (NH)	224	343	336	3.30%	4.80%	4.87%
Pacific Islander alone (NH)	0	3	0	0.00%	0.04%	0.00%
Other race alone (NH)	6	14	15	0.09%	0.20%	0.22%
Mixed race or Multiracial (NH)	136	90	183	2.01%	1.26%	2.65%
Hispanic or Latino (any race)	409	799	854	6.03%	11.18%	12.39%
Total	6,779	7,149	6,893	100.00%	100.00%	100.00%

=== 2020 census ===
As of the 2020 census, Orland Hills had a population of 6,893, including 1,804 families.

The median age was 37.5 years. 22.6% of residents were under the age of 18 and 11.7% were 65 years of age or older. For every 100 females there were 95.9 males, and for every 100 females age 18 and over there were 93.1 males age 18 and over.

There were 2,426 households and 2,477 housing units. The population density was 5,978.32 inhabitants per square mile (2,308.24/km^{2}), and there were 2,148.31 per square mile (829.47/km^{2}) housing units. 100.0% of residents lived in urban areas and 0.0% lived in rural areas.

Of the village's households, 35.2% had children under the age of 18 living in them. 56.5% were married-couple households, 13.7% were households with a male householder and no spouse or partner present, and 24.7% were households with a female householder and no spouse or partner present. About 19.6% of all households were made up of individuals, and 7.3% had someone living alone who was 65 years of age or older. Of all housing units, 2.1% were vacant; the homeowner vacancy rate was 0.4% and the rental vacancy rate was 2.6%.

=== Income and poverty ===
The median income for a household in the village was $82,337, and the median income for a family was $100,000. Males had a median income of $56,938 versus $36,944 for females. The per capita income for the village was $35,688. About 10.0% of families and 12.4% of the population were below the poverty line, including 35.7% of those under age 18 and 6.0% of those age 65 or over.

=== Ancestry ===
According to data compiled between the years of 2010 and 2014, Orland Hills has the third largest percentage of Arab Americans in its population in Illinois, behind only Bridgeview and Chicago Ridge. According to the study, roughly 16.9% of Orland Hill's population is Arab American. It should also be noted that the nearby communities of Orland Park and Tinley Park also have high Arab American populations.

== Government ==
As of 2023, Orland Hills is a part of Illinois' 6th Congressional District which is represented by democrat Sean Casten. Orland Hills has a village board with a mayor. The current mayor of Orland Hills is Kyle R. Hastings Sr. Hastings has been the mayor of Orland Hills since 1993.

As of 2023, Orland Hills is a part of the 37th legislative district in the Illinois House of Representatives, represented by Tim Ozinga, a republican. However, in 2024 Ozinga resigned from his position. He was succeeded by Patrick Sheehan a former police officer in Plainfield, Illinois and an unsuccessful candidate for the Illinois State Senate in 2022, where he lost to incumbent state senator Michael Hastings in the 19th district. The 19th district also encompasses Orland Hills. Sheehan is a republican and resides in Lockport, Illinois.

== Education ==
A majority of students from Orland Hills attend Victor J. Andrew High School (residents who live south of Meadowview Ave), while the rest attend Carl Sandburg High School (residents who live north of Meadowview Ave).

There are two elementary school districts that serve Orland Hills: Kirby School District 140 and the Orland School District 135.

Orland Hills is also home to Cardinal Joseph Bernadine Catholic School, or CJB for short. The school is run by the Roman Catholic Archdiocese of Chicago. Another school located in Orland Hills is a preschool thru 8th grade school is Christian Hills or CHS which is an extension of Christian Hills church.

== Transportation ==
Pace provides bus service on Route 364 connecting Orland Hills to destinations across the Southland.

== Notable people ==
- Michael E. Hastings, Illinois legislator and lawyer. Raised in Orland Hills, but now resides in Tinley Park. His district encompasses Orland Hills.
