= Mokena station =

Commuter rail station in Mokena, Illinois

Mokena

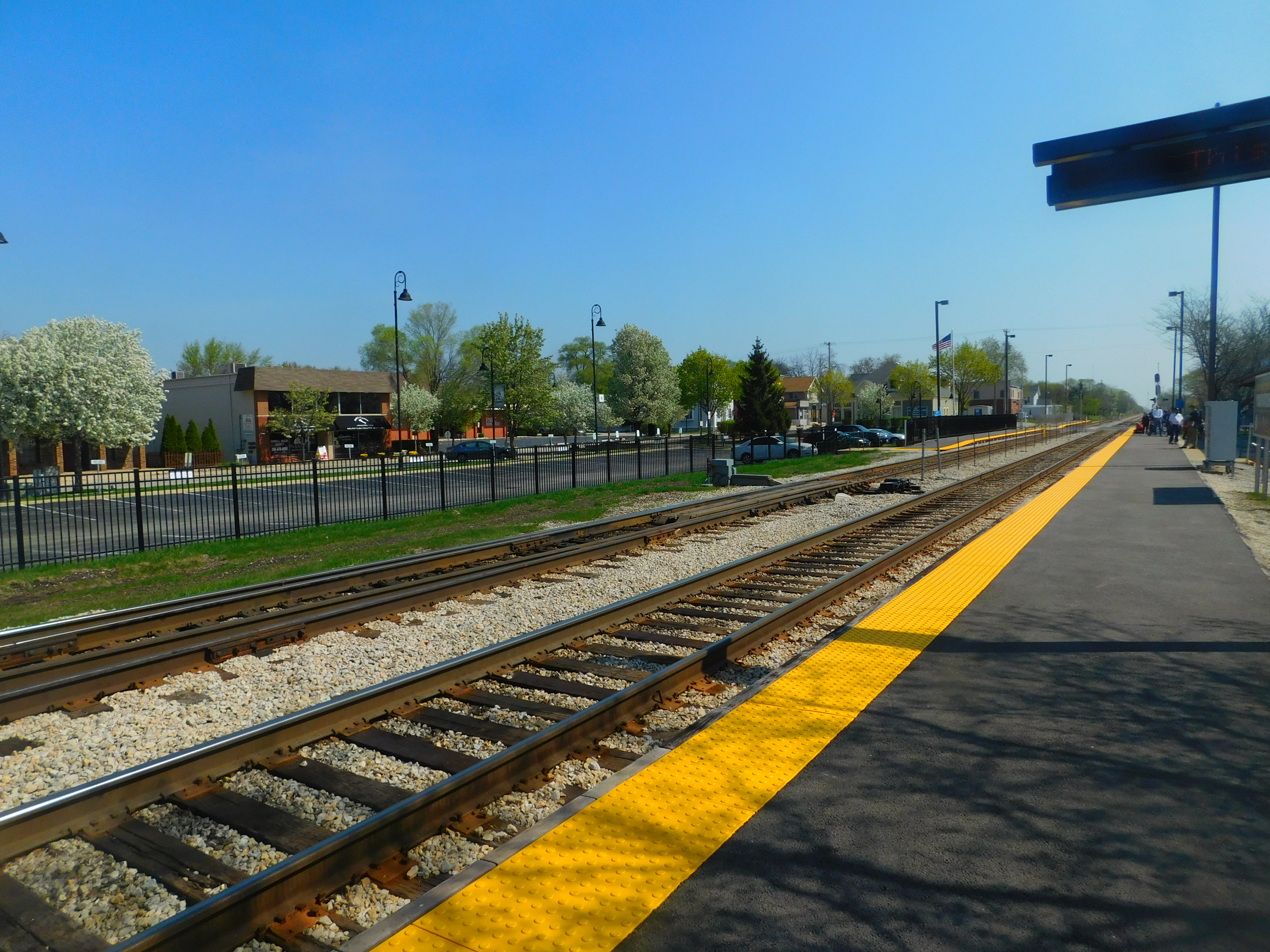
- Mokena station in September 2016

General information
- Location: Front Street and Mokena Street; Mokena, Illinois
- Coordinates: 41.5309°N 87.8866°W
- Owner: Village of Mokena
- Line: Joliet Subdistrict
- Platforms: 2 side platforms
- Tracks: 2

Construction
- Parking: Yes
- Accessible: Yes

Other information
- Fare zone: 4

Passengers
- 2018: 559 (average weekday) ▼7.5%
- Rank: 90 out of 236

Services
| Preceding station | Metra | Following station |
|---|---|---|
| New Lenox toward Joliet | Rock Island | Hickory Creek toward LaSalle |
Former services
| Preceding station | Chicago, Rock Island and Pacific Railroad | Following station |
|---|---|---|
| New Lenox toward Joliet | Suburban Service | Tinley Park toward Chicago |
Track layout
Location

Mokena is one of two commuter rail stations along Metra's Rock Island District line that are located in Mokena, Illinois. The station is located on Front Street and Mokena Street east of Wolf Road, and is 29.6 miles (47.6 km) away from LaSalle Street Station, the northern terminus of the line. In Metra's fare-based system, Mokena is in zone 4. As of 2018, Mokena is the 90th busiest of Metra's 236 non-downtown stations, with an average of 559 weekday boardings.

As of 2022, Mokena is served by 42 trains (21 in each direction) on weekdays, by 21 trains (10 inbound, 11 outbound) on Saturdays, and by 16 trains (eight in each direction) on Sundays and holidays.

Unlike Hickory Creek to the east, Mokena has both a waiting room and a ticket agency window. Parking is available on Front Street between Wolf Road and Mokena Street, as well as on the northwest corner of McGovney Street and Mokena Street. Additional parking can be found further northwest on Willow Crest Lane off of Wolf Road, and at the Village Hall to the northeast on the corners of Division, Third, and Carpenter Streets. Currently, no bus connections are available at the station.

== Tracks ==
There are two tracks at Mokena. Trains from Chicago run on track 2 (the north track) and trains to Chicago run on track 1 (the south track.)
