= Rick Paulas =

American author and journalist

- Born: 1981 (age 44–45); Oak Forest, Illinois
- Education: Michigan State University
- Occupation: Writer

Rick Paulas is an American author and journalist. He gained notoriety for his activism and for pioneering unique distribution methods of his works.

== Early life ==
Paulas was born in Oak Forest, Illinois, a suburb near Chicago, and was raised Catholic. He became a fan of the Chicago White Sox during his childhood.

== Career ==
=== Freelance journalism ===
Paulas began his writing career as a freelance journalist. He emailed editors at online publications seeking to get published and ultimately spent fifteen years writing for outlets such as The Awl, Wired, Vice, McSweeney's, Curbed and Longreads. By 2019, he had spent six years living in Oakland, writing articles about the widespread housing crisis and on topics such as the Ghost Ship warehouse fire.

=== Works of fiction ===
Eastern Span was Paulas' self-published debut work in fiction. It is a noir novel set in 2013 Oakland about a gig-economy investigator named Pug. The protagonist sets out on an adventure to find an acquaintance who disappeared. Along the way, he uncovers a conspiracy regarding the housing climate of the Bay Area that extends into local government and business.

Eastern Span was released in parts, with chapter one being released via the artist's fundraising website Patreon on January 6, 2018. The monthly donations he raised on Patreon contributed to a printing run of one thousand physical copies of the book, to which he added art by local Oakland creators to the beginning of each chapter.

The sale of physical copies of the book was launched in July 2019. To distribute them, Paulas made the unique choice to donate seven hundred to local street newspapers named Street Spirit in the East Bay and Street Sheet in San Francisco. The intent was for vendors to sell Eastern Span alongside their usual street newspaper for a separate price of $20. The vendors quickly sold all of the books that were donated and the unusual selling arrangement prompted several news organizations to publish stories noting the phenomenon.

Avatar of Rick Paulas

Rick Paulas
(@RickPaulas)
tweeted:

Anywho, Eastern Span, a neo-noir set in Oakland circa 2013...

May 25, 2021

Paulas moved to New York City in June 2019, living in the borough of Brooklyn. Looking to sell the remaining inventory of Eastern Span and to cover original printing costs, he began a new sales strategy by advertising on Twitter without actually purchasing promotional space. He would post a reply below viral tweets, giving users a short pitch on the story and how to purchase it. It started in January 2021, in response to a viral Stephen A. Smith tweet and "seven or eight people bought the book off of that one (reply)", according to Paulas. He continued posting these replies and eventually sold all the remaining copies of Eastern Span by September 2021.

Over the years, Paulas had composed and released short stories with a common setting, the fictional Palmer Hotel which is haunted. The short stories move from room to room in the downtown hotel. He collected the stories and re-released them in October 2020, aligning with the Halloween holiday, sending them in email form and in a PDF compilation. The following year, on the heels of selling out of his copies of Eastern Span, Paulas turned the short stories collection into a physical copy and sold it as The Palmer Hotel, using a similar Twitter-based advertising method.

In 2022, a multi-chapter fiction story named The Lady in Greenpoint was released. The story is part of a three-mile walking tour of a haunted Greenpoint starting at the Pulaski Bridge. Hand-drawn charcoal illustrations are combined with audio narration to tell the story.

In 2024, Paulas self-published his next novel, "Malinko," a story he describes as, "a newlywed couple on a Route 66 honeymoon who stumble onto a mysterious radio show." The same year, he also received a grant from the Brooklyn Arts Council to create, "Loups: A Prospect Park Walking Audio Story."

=== Greenpoint History Night ===
As part of his job at Greenpoint bar Oak & Iron, Paulas started Greenpoint History Night.

== Personal life ==
Paulas is a frequent recreational softball league player. One of his home runs was referenced in a On the Media segment by WNYC Studios.
