= Hickory Creek station =

Commuter rail station in Mokena, Illinois

Hickory Creek/Mokena

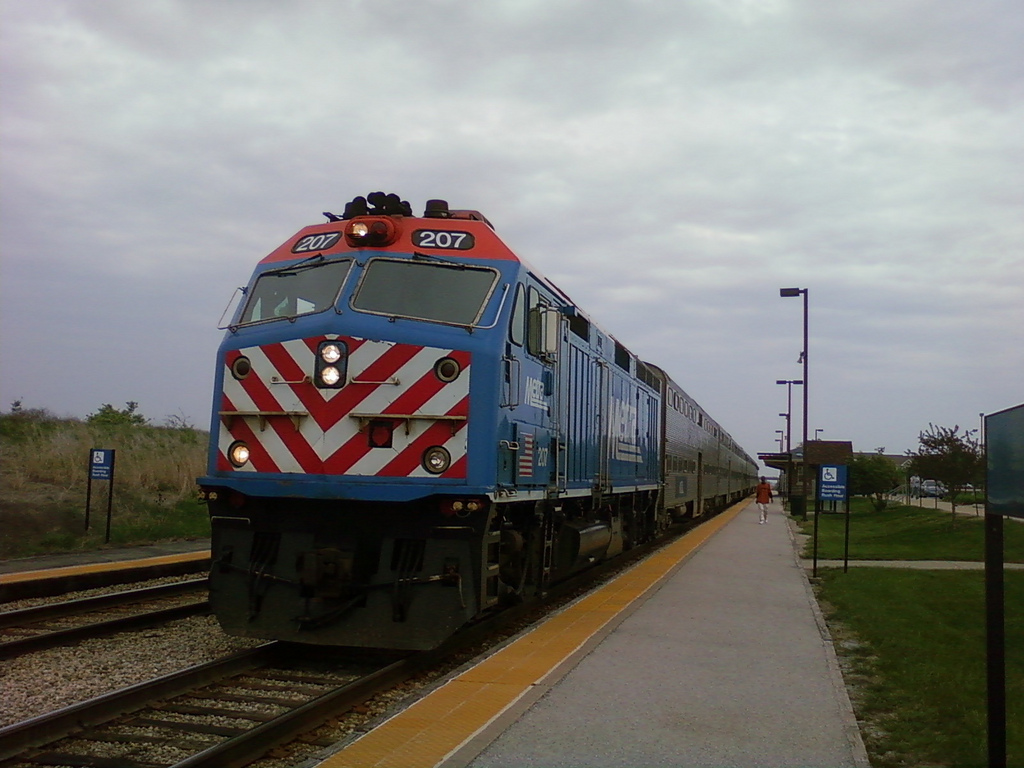

General information
- Location: 9430 Hickory Creek Drive; Mokena, Illinois
- Coordinates: 41.5487°N 87.8456°W
- Owner: Metra
- Line: Joliet Subdistrict
- Platforms: 2 side platforms
- Tracks: 2

Construction
- Parking: Yes
- Accessible: Yes

Other information
- Fare zone: 4

History
- Opened: January 4, 1993

Passengers
- 2018: 1,079 (average weekday) ▲8%
- Rank: 45 out of 236

Services
Preceding station	Metra	Following station
Mokena toward Joliet	Rock Island	80th Avenue/Tinley Park toward LaSalle
Track layout
Location

Hickory Creek, signed as Hickory Creek/Mokena is one of two commuter rail stations along Metra's Rock Island District line that are located in Mokena, Illinois. The station is located at 9430 Hickory Creek Drive east of a former section of US 45, near Exit 145A on Interstate 80, which is the current southbound exit to US 45. It is 27.2 miles (43.8 km) away from LaSalle Street Station, the northern terminus of the line. In Metra's fare-based system, Hickory Creek is in zone 4. As of 2018, Hickory Creek is the 45th busiest of Metra's 236 non-downtown stations, with an average of 1,079 weekday boardings.

As of 2022, Hickory Creek is served by 42 trains (21 in each direction) on weekdays, by 21 trains (10 inbound, 11 outbound) on Saturdays, and by 16 trains (eight in each direction) on Sundays and holidays.

Hickory Creek was built in 1993, and is a fully enclosed brick-faced shelter with no ticket agents. Parking is available in front of the station on Hickory Creek Drive. Currently, no bus connections are available at the station.

== Tracks ==
There are two tracks at Hickory Creek. Trains from Chicago run on track 2 (the north track) and trains to Chicago run on track 1 (the south track.)
