= Midlothian station =

Commuter rail station in Midlothian, Illinois

Midlothian

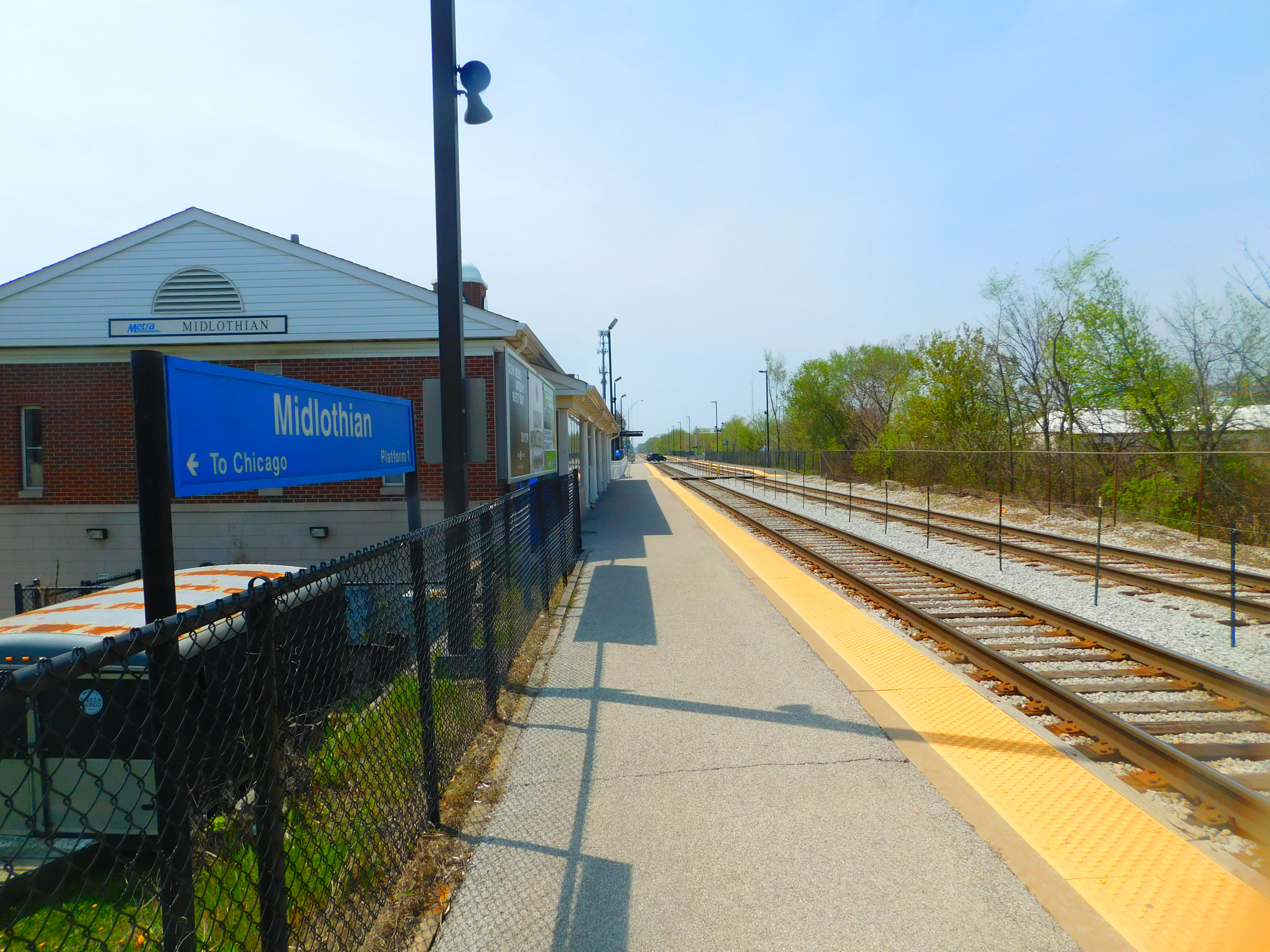
- Midlothian station in April 2016

General information
- Location: 3750 West 147th Street; Midlothian, Illinois
- Coordinates: 41.6264°N 87.7118°W
- Owner: Metra
- Line: Joliet Subdistrict
- Platforms: 2 side platforms
- Tracks: 2
- Connections: Pace Buses

Construction
- Parking: Yes
- Accessible: Yes

Other information
- Fare zone: 2

History
- Rebuilt: 2000

Passengers
- 2018: 938 (average weekday) ▼7.6%
- Rank: 56 out of 236

Services
| Preceding station | Metra | Following station |
|---|---|---|
| Oak Forest toward Joliet | Rock Island | Robbins toward LaSalle |
Former services
| Preceding station | Chicago, Rock Island and Pacific Railroad | Following station |
|---|---|---|
| Oak Forest toward Joliet | Suburban Service | Robbins toward Chicago |
Track layout
Location

Midlothian is a station on Metra's Rock Island District line located in Midlothian, Illinois. The station is located at 3750 West 147th Street (IL 83) Midlothian is 18.4 miles (29.6 km) away from LaSalle Street Station, the northern terminus of the Rock Island District line. In Metra's zone-based fare structure, Midlothian is located in zone 2. As of 2018, Midlothian is the 56th busiest of Metra's 236 non-downtown stations, with an average of 938 weekday boardings.

As of 2022, Midlothian is served by 42 trains (21 in each direction) on weekdays, by 21 trains (10 inbound, 11 outbound) on Saturdays, and by 16 trains (eight in each direction) on Sundays and holidays.

Midlothian is located at grade level and consists of two side platforms which serve two tracks. There is a station house on the inbound platform where tickets can be purchased. Parking is available at the station along 147th Street as well as Waverly Avenue, Prairie Avenue, Hamlin Avenue, and Abbottsford Road.

== Tracks ==
There are two tracks at Midlothian. Trains from Chicago run on track 2 (the north track) and trains to Chicago run on track 1 (the south track.)

== Bus connections ==
Pace

- 354 Harvey/Oak Forest Loop

A Metra train pulling into the Midlothian station
