= McGovney–Yunker Farmstead =

- U.S. National Register of Historic Places
- U.S. Historic district
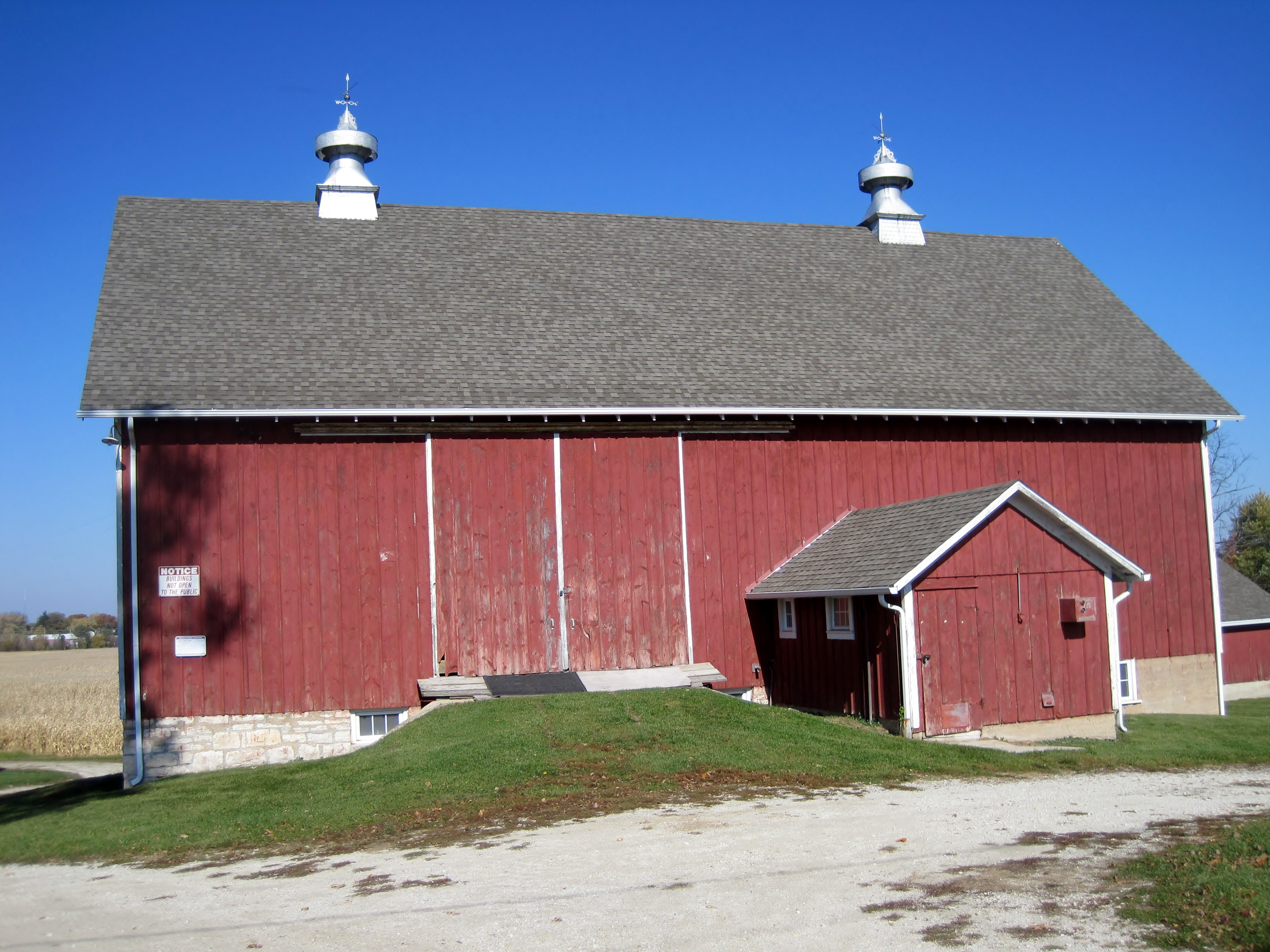
- The gable bank barn on the farmstead

- Location within Illinois Location within the United States
- Location: 10824 LaPorte Road; Mokena, Will County, Illinois, U.S.
- Coordinates: 41°31′36″N 87°52′53″W
- NRHP reference No.: 06000448
- Added to NRHP: May 31, 2006

The McGovney–Yunker Farmstead is a historic farm in Mokena, Illinois.

== History ==
John McGovney was one of the first settlers of Frankfort Township, first legally acquiring the land in 1841. His son Elijah McGovney took control of the property in the 1850s and began to expand the property in 1857. Both John and Elijah primarily harvested corn and oats. The 1854 completion of the Chicago and Rock Island Railroad enabled the McGovneys to conveniently move their products. In the early 1860s, Elijah built a farmhouse and barn on the property. In the late 19th century, Elijah McGovney added a chicken coop, well house, a smokehouse/wood shed, and a second barn/shed. The new structures allowed the family to focus on exporting milk. Following Elijah's death in 1921, the property again passed to his son L. Edward McGovney. He remodeled the farmhouse to conform with early 20th-century architectural trends.

L. Edward McGovney only held on to the farmland for three years, as fellow heirs Fred and Carrie Yunker claimed ownership in 1924. The Yunkers added a few improvements in the 1940s and 1950s, including a hog house, cattle shed, corn crib, and open-wire corn bins. Two doghouses, a garage/workshop, and a tool shed were added in the 1960s followed by a metal shed in the 1970s. Edwin Yunker, the son of the original Yunker owners, worked to ensure that the farm would be used to educate local children about the history of Mokena. Edwin Yunker formed the Mokena Community Park District in 1958 and sold his property to the new entity in the 1990s. The farmstead was listed on the National Register of Historic Places as a historical district on May 31, 2006.
