= Robbins station =

Commuter rail station in Robbins, Illinois

Robbins

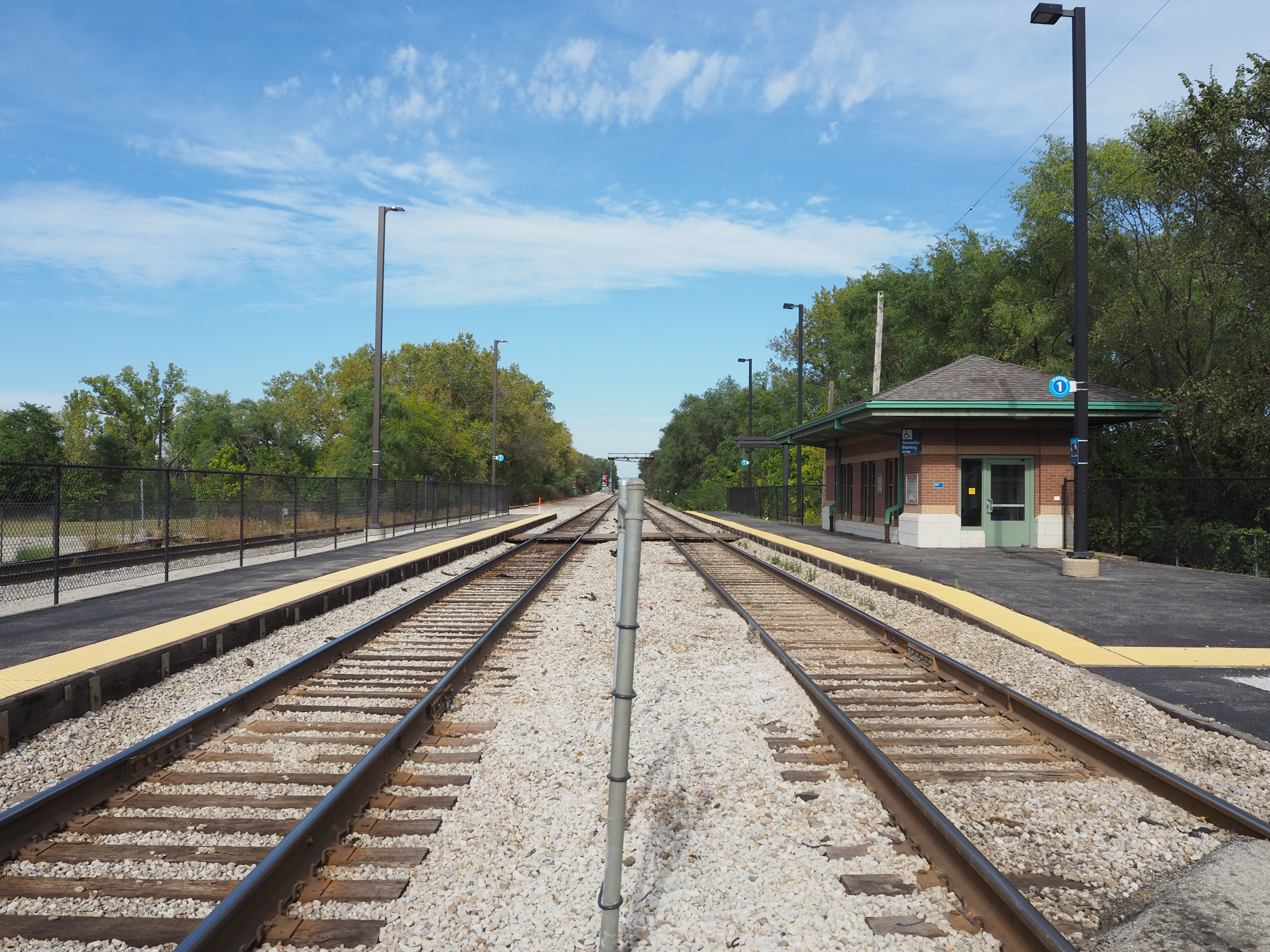
- Robbins station in September 2024

General information
- Location: 3000 West 139th Street; Robbins, Illinois
- Coordinates: 41.6408°N 87.6943°W
- Owner: Metra
- Line: Joliet Subdistrict
- Platforms: 2 side platforms
- Tracks: 2
- Connections: Pace bus

Construction
- Parking: Yes
- Accessible: Yes

Other information
- Fare zone: 2

History
- Rebuilt: 1967, 2007

Passengers
- 2018: 65 (average weekday) ▼27%
- Rank: 203 out of 236

Services
Preceding station	Metra	Following station
Midlothian toward Joliet	Rock Island	Blue Island/Vermont Street toward LaSalle
Former services
Preceding station	Chicago, Rock Island and Pacific Railroad	Following station
Midlothian toward Joliet	Suburban Service	Blue Island Vermont Street toward Chicago
Track layout
Location

Robbins is a station on Metra's Rock Island District line located in Robbins, Illinois. Robbins is located at 139th and Utica. The station is 17.2 miles (27.7 km) from LaSalle Street Station, the northern terminus of the Rock Island District line. In Metra's zone-based fare structure, Robbins is located in zone 2. As of 2018, Robbins is the 203rd busiest of Metra's 236 non-downtown stations, with an average of 65 weekday boardings. Robbins consists of two side platforms which serve two tracks. The station has a small station house on the inbound track, but there is no ticket agent. Parking is available in an adjacent lot.

As of June 2026, Robbins is served by 45 trains (22 inbound and 23 outbound) on weekdays and by 26 trains (13 in each direction) on weekends and holidays.

== Tracks ==
There are two tracks at Robbins. Trains from Chicago run on track 2 (the north track) and trains to Chicago run on track 1 (the south track.)

== Bus connections ==
Pace

- 359 Robbins/South Kedzie Avenue
