= Michael Hastings (politician) =

American politician

Michael E. Hastings
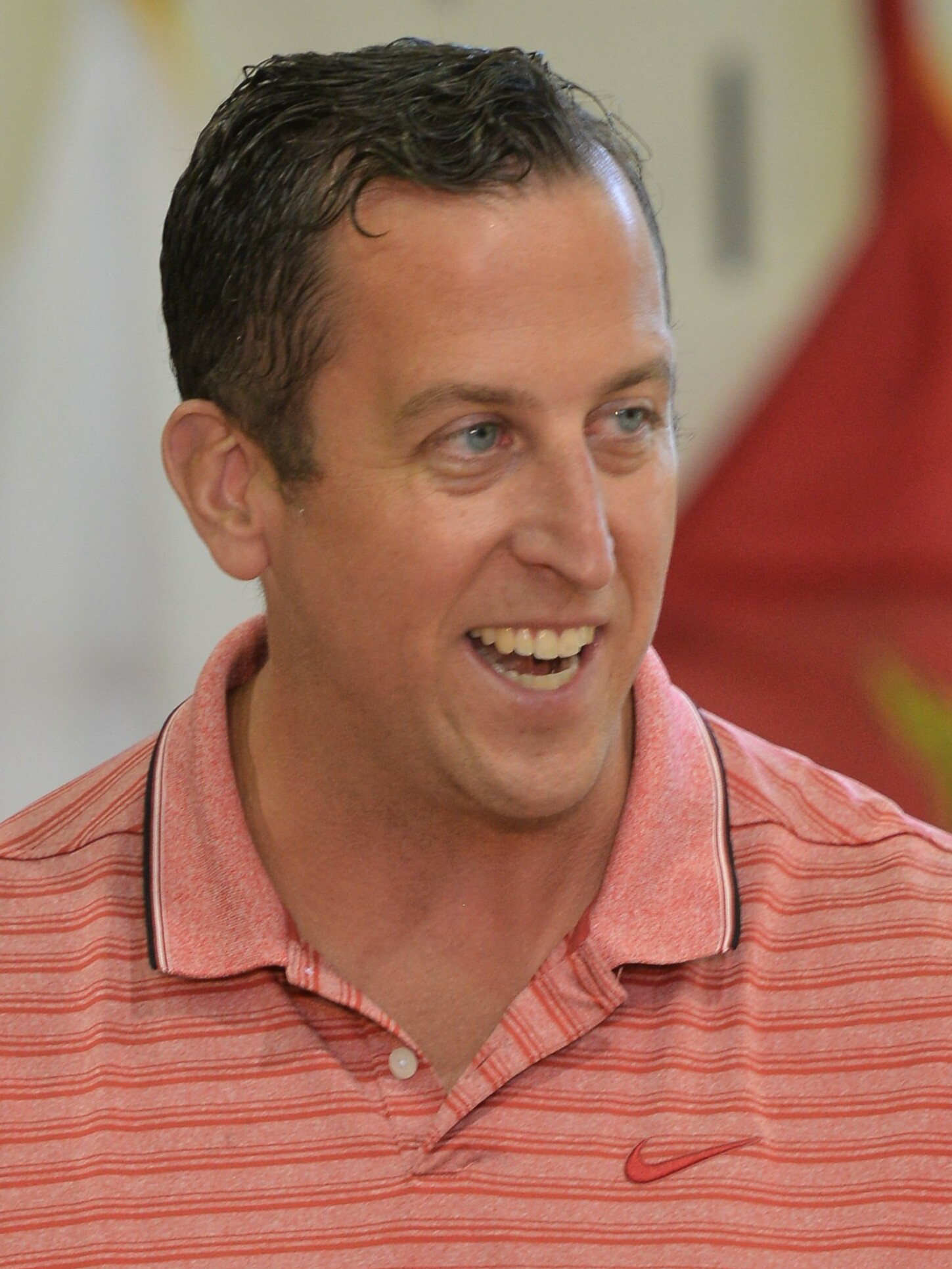

Member of the Illinois Senate from the 19th district
- Incumbent
- Assumed office January 9, 2013
- Preceded by: Maggie Crotty

Personal details
- Born: October 6, 1980 (age 46) Orland Hills, Illinois, U.S.
- Party: Democratic
- Education: U.S. Military Academy (BS); University of Illinois at Urbana–Champaign (MBA); John Marshall Law School (JD)
- Profession: Military officer Business executive Attorney
- Military career
- Allegiance: United States
- Branch: United States Army
- Years: 1998 — 2008
- Rank: Captain
- Units: United States Military Academy; 1st Infantry Division; Iraq Assistance Group; National Training Center
- Battles: Operation Iraqi Freedom
- Awards: Full list

Michael E. Hastings (born October 6, 1980) is a Democratic member of the Illinois Senate from the 19th Legislative District. The district includes all or parts of Lockport, New Lenox, Mokena, Orland Park, Tinley Park, Frankfort, Frankfort Square, Homer Glen, Joliet, Richton Park, Matteson, Olympia Fields, Country Club Hills, Hazel Crest, and Oak Forest.

Prior to his election as a State Senator, Hastings was an officer in the United States Army, businessman and a vice president of a school board of Consolidated High School District 230.

== Early life and education ==
Michael E. Hastings was born and raised in Orland Hills, Illinois as one of six children of Mary and Kyle Hastings. Hastings attended Victor J. Andrew High School where he was an Illinois All-State Football offensive lineman. He served as student government president of Victor J. Andrew High School, and then qualified for an appointment to the U.S. Military Academy at West Point.

Hastings earned his Bachelor of Science degree in leadership and management at West Point and played as an offensive lineman on Army's Division-I football team for four seasons, including the annual Army-Navy rivalry game in Washington D.C. Hastings graduated from West Point in 2003 and was commissioned as an officer in the U.S. Army. Hastings was at West Point when al-Qaida terrorists attacked the U.S. on September 11, 2001. He later served in Iraq, advanced to the rank of captain and served as aide-de-camp to the commanding general of the 1st Infantry Division. He earned a Bronze Star for meritorious service in a combat zone.

In 2008, Hastings joined Johnson & Johnson's Biosurgery sales division in Chicago serving hospitals, health care facilities and surgeons.

Hastings' public service career began with his election to the board of trustees for High School District 230 and then as vice president of the board. Hastings also served as co-chair of the district's finance and education committees. Hastings earned a master's degree in business administration with honors from the Gies College of Business at the University of Illinois at Urbana–Champaign and a Juris Doctor degree from John Marshall Law School in Chicago.

== Illinois Senate ==
=== Tinley Park Mental Health Center ===
In 2010, Governor Quinn shut down the Tinley Park Mental Health Center. Senator Hastings led the efforts for the State of Illinois to transfer the property to the Tinley Park Park District. In 2023, after months of negotiations, the State of Illinois agreed to sell the Tinley Park Mental Health Center (TPMHC) to the Tinley Park Park District for $1. Senator Hastings also helped assist the Tinley Park Park District by providing a $15 million grant to assist in the remediation and redevelopment of the property.

=== South Suburban Airport ===
Hastings co-sponsored Senate Bill 20, which was signed into law by Governor Quinn on July 25, 2014. The act, co-sponsored by Hastings, dedicated funding to the development of a new airport in Peotone. The airport will be built by the Illinois Department of Transportation and operate in a public-private partnership, known as a "P3".

In 2023, Senator Hastings sponsored House Bill 2531, which requires the Illinois Department of Transportation (IDOT) to enter into public-private agreements and to establish a prequalification process for vendors to participate in the development, financing, construction, management and the operation of the new airport. The Illinois Department of Transportation is mandated to complete the prequalification process by June 2024.

=== Serving Illinois Veterans ===
Senator Hastings was appointed to serve as the Chairman of the Illinois Senate Veterans Affairs Committee in 2023. From 2012 to 2022, Hastings has either introduced or co-sponsored legislation that improves the overall quality of live and expands benefits to veterans across Illinois. He sponsored Senate Bill 3762, which allows legally adopted dependents under the age of 18 at the time of adoption and step-children who were under the age of 18 at the time of marriage would be eligible for the MIA/POW Scholarship.

From 2015 to 2018, total of 14 people died and more than 60 have fell ill at Quincy Veterans Home from exposure to the Legionella bacterium since August 2015. Hastings authored Senate Bill 2481, which would remove a $100,000 cap for state payouts in civil litigation. The measure will allow families greater restitution for the loved ones who died as a result of state negligence and mismanagement. This piece of legislation passed both chambers of the General Assembly, but was vetoed by Governor Bruce Rauner. Hastings led the effort to override Governor Bruce Rauner's veto and the bill was enacted into law by a legislative override.

=== Pension reform ===
Hastings sponsored Senate Bill 2591 to help combat the state's nearly $100 billion pension shortfall. The plan, created with help from the University of Illinois Institute for Government and Public Affairs, calls for workers at state colleges and universities to kick in an additional two percent to their pension funds. The increase would be phased in over a four-year period. Also under the plan, the three percent compound interest on cost-of-living-adjustments, or COLAs, would change to one-half of the inflation rate. Although the proposal involves the State Universities Retirement System, Glenn Poshard, President of Southern Illinois University, said it could "serve as an example for a more comprehensive pension reform plan."

Hastings also sponsored HB 4691 which provides that, upon creation of a new downstate police pension fund by referendum or census, the Illinois Municipal Retirement Fund (IMRF) shall transfer to the new pension fund the employee contributions for service as a police officer of the municipality that is creating the new pension fund, plus interest, and an amount representing employer contributions, equal to the total amount determined under item (1). Provides that the transfer shall terminate any further rights of such employees under IMRF that arise out of that service. House Bill 4691 was signed into law by Governor Pat Quinn on July 16, 2014.

=== Committee assignments ===
Committee Assignments, 103rd General Assembly
- Veterans Affairs (Chairman)
- Judiciary
- Licensed Activities
- Special Issues

Committee Assignments, 102nd General Assembly
- Energy and Public Utilities (SENE) (Chairman)
- Critical Energy Infrastructure and Grid Reliability (SENE-ECEI) (Co-Chairman)
- Executive - Consolidation (SEXC-SECO) (Chairman)
- Judiciary - Property Law (SJUD-SJPL) (Chairman)
- Appropriations - Agriculture, Environment & Energy (SAPP)
- Appropriations - Higher Education (SAPP-SAHE)
- Education (SESE)
- Executive (SEXC)
- Insurance
- Redistricting - South Cook County

Committee Assignments, 101st General Assembly
- Executive (Chairperson)
- Executive Appointments
- Commerce and Economic Development
- Energy and Public Utilities
- Insurance
- Judiciary
- Subcommittee on Election Law
- Subcommittee on Gaming
- Subcommittee on Special Issues (Sub-Chairperson)
- Subcommittee on Firearms (Sub-Chairperson)
- Subcommittee on Tort Reform (Sub-Chairperson).

Committee Assignments, 100th General Assembly
- Energy and Public Utilities (Chairperson)
- Appropriations I
- Appropriations II
- Insurance
- Judiciary
- Veterans Affairs (Vice-Chairperson)
- Gaming
- Subcommittee on Cybersecurity (Sub-Chairperson)
- Subcommittee on Tort Reform
- Subcommittee on Business Entities

Committee Assignments, 99th General Assembly
- Judiciary (Vice Chairman)
- Appropriations I
- Appropriations II
- Financial Institutions
- Insurance
- Subcommittee on Special Issues (Sub-Chairperson)
- State Government & Veterans Affairs

Committee Assignments, 98th General Assembly
- Judiciary (Vice-Chairman)
- Appropriations II
- Financial Institutions
- Insurance
- Legislative Petitions
- State Government & Veterans Affairs

=== Legislative & Community Service awards ===
Senator Hastings has received the following legislative and community service awards:

- Distinguished Legislative Service Award, The Link & Option Center
- Excellence in Leadership Award, Chicago Southland Convention & Visitors Bureau
- Excellence in Leadership Award, South Suburban Park and Recreation Professional Association
- Environmental Champion, Illinois Environmental Council
- Elected Official of the Year, Matteson Chamber of Commerce
- Friend of Agriculture, Illinois Farm Bureau
- Humanitarian Award, Grand Prairie Services
- Legislator of the Year, Illinois Association of Family Physicians
- Legislator of the Year, Illinois Association of Park Districts
- Legislator of the Year, Illinois Municipal League
- Legislator of the Year, Illinois Public Transportation Association
- Legislator of the Year, Illinois Public Higher Education Cooperative
- Legislator of the Year, Illinois State Crime Commission
- Legislator of the Year, Illinois State Veterinary Medical Association
- Legislator of the Year, Mental Health Association of Illinois
- Legislator of the Year, Sangamon County Farm Bureau
- Legislator of the Year, Southwest Community Services Foundation
- Legislator of the Year, Southland Health Care Forum
- Legislative Excellence Award, Associated Beer Distributors of Illinois
- Martin Luther King Jr. Spirit of Excellence Award, Southland Ministerial Health Network
- Public Official of the Year, Illinois Association of Chiefs of Police
- Alumni of the Year, the University of Illinois College of Business
- Alumni Hall of Fame Recipient, Consolidated High School District #230

== 2022 Illinois secretary of state campaign ==
Hastings entered the race for Illinois secretary of state in the 2022 election on March 3, 2021, but withdrew in June 2021.

== Electoral history ==
Illinois State Senate 19th District General Election, 2022
Party	Candidate	Votes	%
Democratic	Michael E. Hastings	41,905	50.6
Republican	Patrick Sheehan	40,924	49.4

Illinois State Senate 19th District Primary Election, 2022
Party	Candidate	Votes	%
Democratic	Michael E. Hastings	17,360	100
Democratic	Unopposed		

Illinois State Senate 19th District General Election, 2020
Party	Candidate	Votes	%
Democratic	Michael E. Hastings	90,460	100
Republican	Unopposed		

Illinois State Senate 19th District Primary Election, 2020
Party	Candidate	Votes	%
Democratic	Michael E. Hastings	30,722	100
Democratic	Unopposed		

Illinois State Senate 19th District General Election, 2016
Party	Candidate	Votes	%
Democratic	Michael E. Hastings	83,628	100
Republican	Unopposed		

Illinois State Senate 19th District Primary Election, 2016
Party	Candidate	Votes	%
Democratic	Michael E. Hastings	32,084	81.1
Democratic	McStephen O.A. "Max" Solomon	7,474	18.9

Illinois State Senate 19th District General Election, 2012
Party	Candidate	Votes	%
Democratic	Michael E. Hastings	62,029	62.2
Republican	Edgar Montalvo	37,704	37.8

Illinois State Senate 19th District Primary Election, 2012
Party	Candidate	Votes	%
Democratic	Michael E. Hastings	11,480	76.8
Democratic	Gregory Hannon	3,476	23.2

Consolidated High School District 230 Election, 2009
Party	Candidate	Votes	%
Independent	Frank J. Grabowski	7,433	14.45
Independent	Carol Baker	6,453	12.54
Independent	Laura Murphy	8,569	16.66
Independent	Linda Peckham	6,290	12.23
Independent	Thomas E. Brennan	5,911	11.49
Independent	Kathleen J. Murphy-Peterson	6,417	12.47
Independent	Michael E. Hastings	6,679	12.98
Independent	Bob Shelstrom	3,696	7.18

== Military awards and decorations ==
U.S. military decorations
Bronze Star
Meritorious Service Medal
Army Commendation Medal (with 1 Oak Leaf Cluster)
Army Achievement Medal (with 1 Oak Leaf Cluster)
U.S. Unit Awards
Joint Meritorious Unit Award
Iraq Campaign Medal (with 2 Service Star)
Global War on Terrorism Service Medal
National Defense Service Medal
Army Service Ribbon
Army Overseas Service Ribbon
U.S. badges, patches and tabs
1st Infantry Division Shoulder Sleeve Insignia worn as his Combat Service Identification Badge
5th Field Artillery Regiment Distinctive Unit Insignia
2 Overseas Service Bars
