= New Lenox station =

Commuter rail station in New Lenox, Illinois

New Lenox

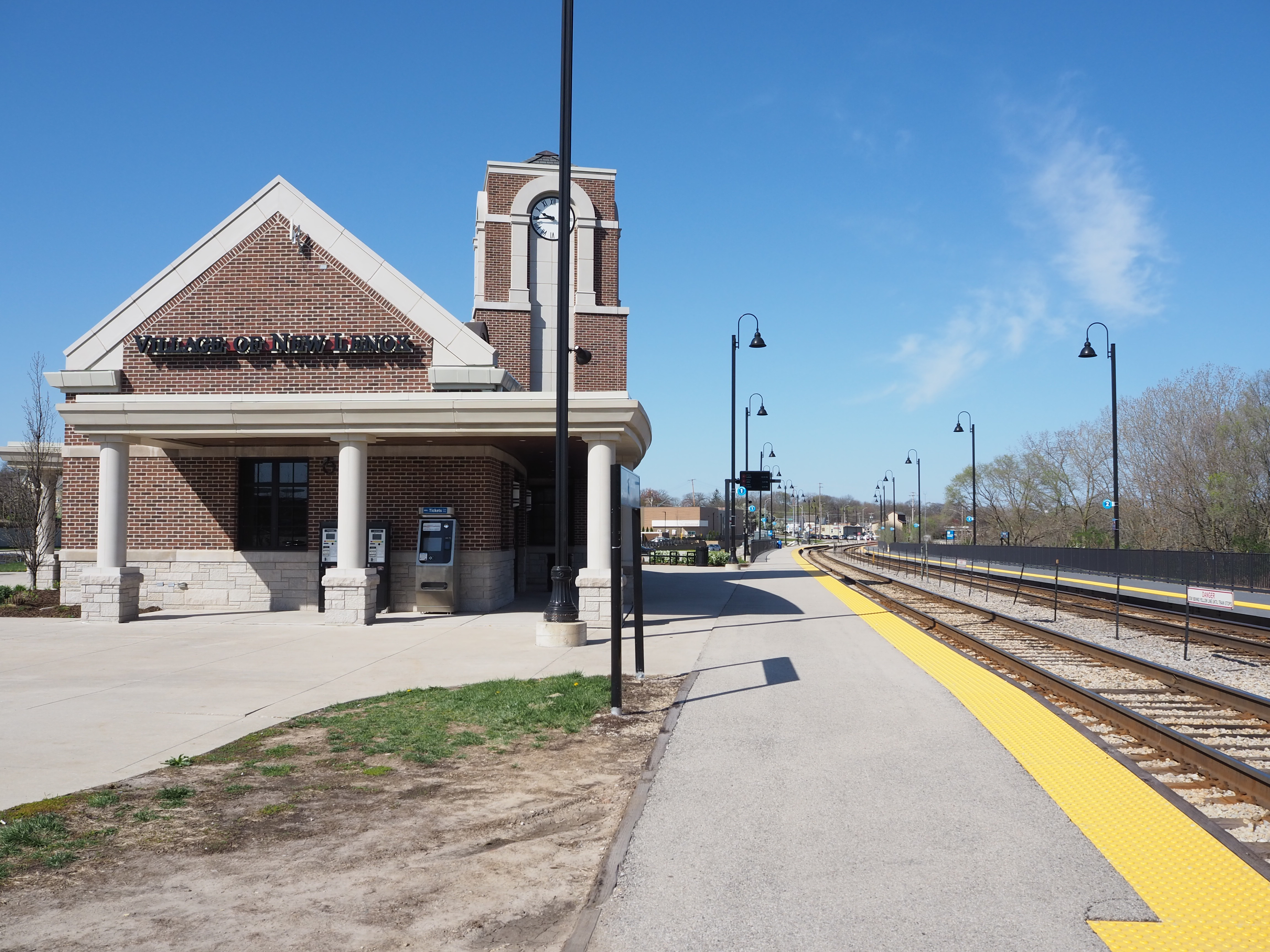
- New Lenox station in April 2024

General information
- Location: 300 North Church Street; New Lenox, Illinois
- Coordinates: 41.5144°N 87.9653°W
- Owner: Metra
- Line: Joliet Subdistrict
- Platforms: 2 side platforms
- Tracks: 2

Construction
- Parking: Yes
- Accessible: Yes

Other information
- Fare zone: 4

History
- Opened: 1852

Passengers
- 2018: 1,046 (average weekday) ▼6.2%
- Rank: 49 out of 236

Services
Preceding station	Metra	Following station
Joliet Terminus	Rock Island	Mokena toward LaSalle
Former services
Preceding station	Chicago, Rock Island and Pacific Railroad	Following station
Joliet Terminus	Suburban Service	Mokena toward Chicago
Track layout
Location

New Lenox is a commuter train station along Metra's Rock Island District line in New Lenox, a southern suburb of Chicago, Illinois. The station is officially located on 300 North Church Street, and lies 34.0 miles (54.7 km) away from LaSalle Street Station, the northern terminus of the line, however parking is available between Church Street and far northeast of Haven Avenue. It is also the penultimate station along the RID line before reaching the end of the line at Joliet Transportation Center. In Metra's fare-based system, New Lenox station is in zone 4. As of 2018, New Lenox is the 49th busiest of Metra's 236 non-downtown stations, with an average of 1,046 weekday boardings.

As of 2022, New Lenox is served by 42 trains (21 in each direction) on weekdays, by 21 trains (10 inbound, 11 outbound) on Saturdays, and by 16 trains (eight in each direction) on Sundays and holidays. It is located just north of U.S. Route 30.

New Lenox station was originally built by the Chicago, Rock Island & Pacific Railroad in 1852 with a small wooden depot. In 1900, the station received a larger brick depot which stood for over a century until it was relocated in 2018 to make way for a new depot on the site. At that time, the 1900-vintage depot was moved 6 miles (9.7 km) north by truck and now serves as a ticket office for a corn maze in Homer Glen.

The station is also west of a bridge that carries a former Wabash Railroad line which now serves as Metra's SouthWest Service line. A new station was built for that line at Laraway Road in 2006. There are no convenient transfers between these two stations. Like Laraway Road station, no bus connections are currently available at New Lenox.

== Tracks ==
There are two tracks at New Lenox. Trains from Chicago run on track 2 (the north track) and trains to Chicago run on track 1 (the south track.)
