= Tinley Park Community Consolidated School District 146 =

School district in Illinois, United States

Address
- 6611 171st Street Tinley Park, Illinois, 60477; United States

District information
- Type: Public
- Grades: PreK–8
- NCES District ID: 1739030

Students and staff
- Students: 2,320

Other information
- Website: www.district146.org

Community Consolidated School District 146 is located in the southwest suburbs of Chicago, Illinois, United States. It is home to approximately 2500 students.

The Administration Center is located at 6611 W 171st Street in Tinley Park, IL. The Superintendent for the CCSD146 is Dr. Jeff Stawick.

== Schools ==
The District has four elementary schools and one middle school. The Pre-k through 5th grade schools are:

- Fierke Education Center in Oak Forest, IL. The principal is Dr. Damien Aherne. Their mascot is the bee stinger and the school colors are black and yellow.
- Fulton School in Tinley Park, IL. The principal is Ms. Megan Mitera. The school mascot is the flames and the school color is royal blue.
- Kruse Education Center in Orland Park, IL. The principal is Mrs. Kim Hartnett. The mascot is a bear and the school colors are red and yellow.
- Memorial School in Tinley Park, IL. The principal is Mr. Joe Trsar. The mascot is an eagle and the school color is red.

The middle school is grades 6-8:

- Central Middle School is in Tinley Park, IL and the principal is Dr. Don Hantson. The school mascot is a twister and the school colors are navy blue and silver.
