= Lincoln Trail State Memorial =

Sculpture group

Coordinates: 38.683126°N 87.536264°W

The Lincoln Trail State Memorial is a sculpture group designed in 1937 by Nellie Verne Walker and erected in 1938 to commemorate the first entrance of Abraham Lincoln, then a destitute 21-year-old frontiersman, into Illinois. It is located at the west end of the Lincoln Memorial Bridge on U.S. Route 50 Business in rural Lawrence County, approximately 11 miles (18 km) east of Lawrenceville.

== Description ==
Lincoln's own memories, and independent records, point to the family of Thomas Lincoln entering Illinois in early March, 1830, crossing over the Wabash River by primitive flatboat or ferry from their former home in Indiana. After unloading themselves from the boat, the Lincoln family would have hitched up their oxen to the cart or wagon that carried their modest household goods, and begun to trudge northwest on the primitive trails that led to open, unclaimed farmland in central Illinois. Walker's sculptural installation depicts the scene, with the family, animals, and oxcart depicted in bas-relief carved in Bedford stone and a tall young man, representing the young Lincoln, cast in bronze and given a prominent place on the pedestal in front of the relief.

Following their entry into Illinois, the Lincoln family trekked to what is now known as the Lincoln Trail Homestead State Memorial near Decatur, Illinois, where young Abraham parted ways with his family. The Lincoln Trail State Memorial was installed in 1938 during the administration of Illinois Governor Henry Horner, an admirer of the Lincoln legacy. A bridge had replaced the old flatboats and ferries that had previously crossed the Wabash River. Horner hoped that the Memorial would both pay tribute to the young Lincoln and also serve as a sort of roadside welcome center to westward-bound drivers on U.S. Route 50, which was then a key east–west trunk route in the central U.S. states.

Less than thirty years after the installation, however, the federal Interstate highway system bypassed Lawrence County and its Memorial. As of 2011, the Lincoln Trail State Memorial continues to mark a bridge entry-point into Illinois; the Memorial is an unstaffed site operated by the Illinois Historic Preservation Agency.
