= Tinley Park, Illinois =

- Village
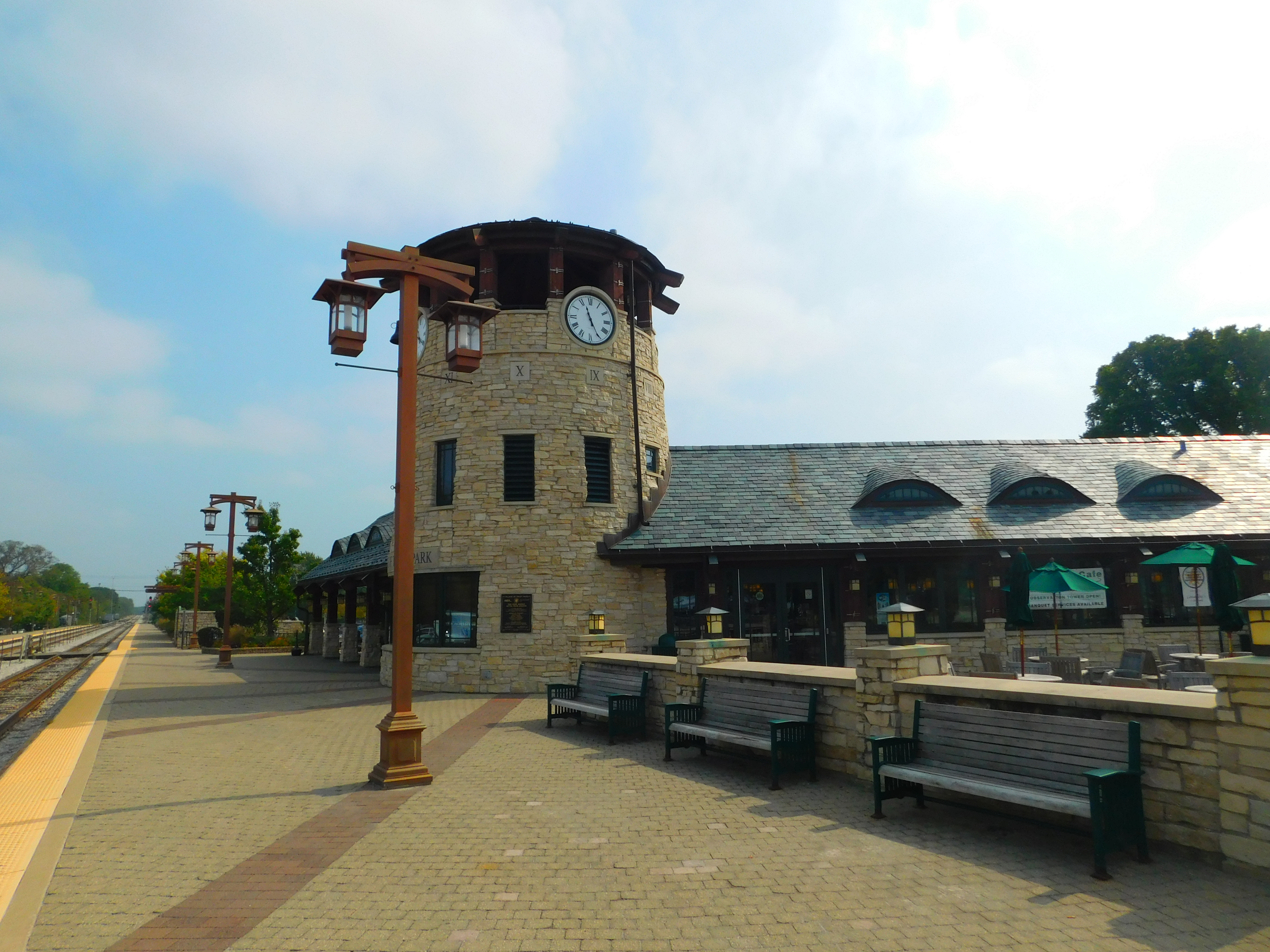
- Tinley Park station

- Flag Seal
- Nickname: Tinley
- Motto: "Life Amplified"
- Interactive map of Tinley Park, Illinois
- Location within Greater Chicago Location within Illinois Location within the United States
- Coordinates: 41.568579°N 87.804217°W
- Country: United States
- State: Illinois
- Counties: Cook, Will
- Townships: Cook: Bremen, Orland, Rich; Will: Frankfort
- Settled: 1853 as Bremen
- Incorporated: June 27, 1892

Government
  - Type: Council–Manager
  - Mayor: Michael W. Glotz

Area
  - Total: 16.188 sq mi (41.927 km^{2})
  - Land: 16.176 sq mi (41.896 km^{2})
  - Water: 0.012 sq mi (0.031 km^{2}) 0.07%
- Elevation: 738 ft (225 m)

Population (2020)
  - Total: 55,971
  - Estimate (2024): 54,856
  - Density: 3,460.1/sq mi (1,336.0/km^{2})
- Demonym: Tinley Parker
- Time zone: UTC–6 (Central (CST))
  - Summer (DST): UTC–5 (CDT)
- ZIP Codes: 60477, 60478, 60487
- Area codes: 708, 464, 815, and 779
- FIPS code: 17-75484
- GNIS feature ID: 2399987
- Website: tinleypark.org

Tinley Park is a village in Cook and Will counties in the U.S. state of Illinois. The population was 55,971 at the 2020 census, and was estimated at 54,856 in 2024. It is a southern suburb of the Chicago metropolitan area.

== History ==
=== 19th century ===
Modern settlement of the area now known as Tinley Park began in the 1820s as emigrants from Europe and the eastern United States arrived. By the 1840s, a significant population of German Americans had established themselves in the region. In recognition of their prominence, the village was officially named Bremen when it was founded in 1853. Other early settler groups included Irish, English, Scottish, Canadian immigrants.

In the late 19th century, the expansion of the American railroad network had a transformative effect on the area. Bremen was situated along the Chicago, Rock Island and Pacific Railroad, which played a pivotal role in the community's development. In 1890, the village was renamed Tinley Park in honor of Samuel Tinley Sr., the first station agent of the local railroad depot. The village was formally incorporated on June 27, 1892, when local residents voted 34–24 in favor of incorporation. Henry Vogt was elected as Tinley Park’s first mayor.

=== 20th century to present ===
The arrival of the railroad spurred industrial and commercial growth in Tinley Park. In 1905, the Diamond Spiral Washing Machine Company established its first factory in the village. Local businessmen established an electric utility in 1909. A cola bottling plant also operated in Tinley Park until the 1950s. During this period, inventor John Rauhoff developed ironite, a waterproofing additive for cement, later used in the construction of the Hoover Dam. The Tinley Park Public Library was constructed in 1956. In the latter half of the 20th century, Tinley Park experienced rapid suburban expansion, particularly to the west and south of the original village center. Between 1970 and 1994, more than 11,000 housing units were constructed.

After its centennial in 1992, Tinley Park has focused on the renovation of its historic downtown district, which encompasses the Village's original 1892 boundaries. In this district, landowners are encouraged to maintain the sites' historic edifices or to create new, but "historically-friendly", facades for otherwise modern buildings built in the last 30 years. Downtown renovation projects have included the opening of a park near the Oak Park Avenue Metra train station, as well as the recent South Street Project, a multimillion-dollar project that will create more than 220 apartments and 40,000 square feet (4,000 m^{2}) of commercial retail space.

Since its opening in 1990, the Credit Union 1 Amphitheatre (originally World Music Theater, among other names) has been a major outdoor music venue in the Chicago area, accommodating around 28,000 people per event. The amphitheater, which has hosted numerous musicians and festivals over its 30+ years in operation, features an overhead-covered seated section with open sides, and a large, sloping grass lawn area at the back.

On February 2, 2008, a mass shooting occurred at Lane Bryant in Brookside Marketplace on the Will County side of the village. The store closed after the shooting. The shooter has never been caught.

== Geography ==
According to the United States Census Bureau, the village has a total area of 16.188 square miles (41.93 km^{2}), of which 16.176 square miles (41.90 km^{2}) is land and 0.012 square miles (0.031 km^{2}) (0.07%) is water.

It is bordered by Oak Forest to the northeast, Orland Park to the northwest, Orland Hills and Mokena to the west, Country Club Hills to the east. Matteson to the southeast, Frankfort to the southwest and Frankfort Square to the south.

== Demographics ==
Historical population
Census	Pop.	Note	%±
1900	300		—
1910	309		3.0%
1920	493		59.5%
1930	823		66.9%
1940	1,136		38.0%
1950	2,326		104.8%
1960	6,392		174.8%
1970	12,572		96.7%
1980	26,178		108.2%
1990	37,121		41.8%
2000	48,401		30.4%
2010	56,703		17.2%
2020	55,971		−1.3%
2024 (est.)	54,856	▼	−2.0%
U.S. Decennial Census; 2020 Census

=== Racial and ethnic composition ===
Tinley Park, Illinois – racial and ethnic composition Note: the US Census treats Hispanic/Latino as an ethnic category. This table excludes Latinos from the racial categories and assigns them to a separate category. Hispanics/Latinos may be of any race.
Race / ethnicity (NH = non-Hispanic)	Pop. 1980	Pop. 1990	Pop. 2000	Pop. 2010	Pop. 2020
White alone (NH)	25,004 (95.52%)	35,036 (94.38%)	43,787 (90.47%)	47,858 (84.40%)	43,852 (78.35%)
Black or African American alone (NH)	442 (1.69%)	601 (1.62%)	923 (1.91%)	2,062 (3.64%)	3,540 (6.32%)
Native American or Alaska Native alone (NH)	37 (0.14%)	28 (0.08%)	34 (0.07%)	52 (0.09%)	7 (0.01%)
Asian alone (NH)	308 (1.18%)	507 (1.37%)	1,143 (2.36%)	2,199 (3.88%)	2,345 (4.19%)
Pacific Islander alone (NH)	—	—	8 (0.02%)	6 (0.01%)	5 (0.01%)
Other race alone (NH)	11 (0.04%)	5 (0.01%)	41 (0.08%)	29 (0.05%)	129 (0.23%)
Mixed race or multiracial (NH)	—	—	467 (0.96%)	599 (1.06%)	1,397 (2.50%)
Hispanic or Latino (any race)	367 (1.40%)	944 (2.54%)	1,998 (4.13%)	3,898 (6.87%)	4,696 (8.39%)
Total	26,178 (100.00%)	37,121 (100.00%)	48,401 (100.00%)	56,703 (100.00%)	55,971 (100.00%)

=== 2020 census ===
As of the 2020 census, there were 55,971 people and 15,009 families residing in the village. The median age was 43.0 years. 19.9% of residents were under the age of 18 and 19.5% of residents were 65 years of age or older. For every 100 females there were 93.1 males, and for every 100 females age 18 and over there were 89.5 males age 18 and over.

100.0% of residents lived in urban areas, while 0.0% lived in rural areas.

There were 22,006 households in Tinley Park, of which 27.7% had children under the age of 18 living in them. Of all households, 53.6% were married-couple households, 14.5% were households with a male householder and no spouse or partner present, and 27.0% were households with a female householder and no spouse or partner present. About 27.2% of all households were made up of individuals and 13.2% had someone living alone who was 65 years of age or older.

The population density was 3,477.32 inhabitants per square mile (1,342.6/km^{2}). There were 22,751 housing units at an average density of 1,413.46 per square mile (545.7/km^{2}). Of all housing units, 3.3% were vacant. The homeowner vacancy rate was 1.1% and the rental vacancy rate was 7.5%.

=== Income and poverty ===
The median income for a household in the village was $82,163, and the median income for a family was $103,902. Males had a median income of $61,179 versus $41,084 for females. The per capita income for the village was $40,955. About 4.2% of families and 5.8% of the population were below the poverty line, including 7.8% of those under age 18 and 5.8% of those age 65 or over.

=== 2024 estimate ===
As of the 2024 estimate, there were 54,856 people, 22,058 households, and _ families residing in the village. The population density was 3,391.20 inhabitants per square mile (1,309.3/km^{2}). There were 22,881 housing units at an average density of 1,414.50 per square mile (546.1/km^{2}). The racial makeup of the village was 79.2% White (76.8% NH White), 6.7% African American, 0.0% Native American, 3.6% Asian, 0.0% Pacific Islander, _% from some other races and 7.3% from two or more races. Hispanic or Latino people of any race were 10.6% of the population.

=== Demographic estimates ===
According to realtor website Zillow, the average price of a home as of December 31, 2025, in Tinley Park is $315,468.

As of the 2023 American Community Survey, there are 22,058 estimated households in Tinley Park with an average of 2.49 persons per household. The village has a median household income of $103,819. Approximately 5.2% of the village's population lives at or below the poverty line. Tinley Park has an estimated 62.8% employment rate, with 38.4% of the population holding a bachelor's degree or higher and 96.1% holding a high school diploma. There were 22,881 housing units at an average density of 1,414.50 per square mile (546.1/km^{2}).

The top five reported languages (people were allowed to report up to two languages, thus the figures will generally add to more than 100%) were English (84.4%), Spanish (4.4%), Indo-European (4.1%), Asian and Pacific Islander (1.8%), and Other (5.2%).

The median age in the village was 42.3 years.

== Government ==
Tinley Park is divided between two congressional districts. Most of the village, including all the area in Bremen Township and Rich Township, as well as the area in Will County, is in Illinois's 1st congressional district; the area in Orland Township south of 167th Street, as well as most of the area southwest of 163rd Street and Ozark Avenue, is in the 3rd district.

== Education ==
Tinley Park includes four public school districts – Kirby School District 140 (contains 5 grade schools, and 2 middle schools: Prairie View Middle School, and Virgil I. Grissom Middle School), Community Consolidated School District 146 (contains 4 grade schools, and Central Middle School), Summit Hill School District 161, (contains 5 grade schools, and Summit Hill Junior High School) and Elementary School District 159 (contains 4 grade schools, and Colin Powell Middle School).

The town also includes three parochial Pre-K through 8 elementary schools: St. George, which is Catholic; Trinity Lutheran, affiliated with the LCMS; and Southwest Chicago Christian School of Tinley Park.

Victor J. Andrew High School (Consolidated High School District 230) and Tinley Park High School (Bremen Community High School District 228) are both secondary schools located in Tinley Park. A small portion of Tinley Park students go to Lincoln-Way East High School. A small portion in the southwest part of the village also attends Rich Central High School.

Most residents of Tinley Park are located within the residency boundaries for Moraine Valley Community College; the rest reside in the community college district for South Suburban College. A very small portion of Tinley Park goes to Joliet Junior College.

== Transportation ==
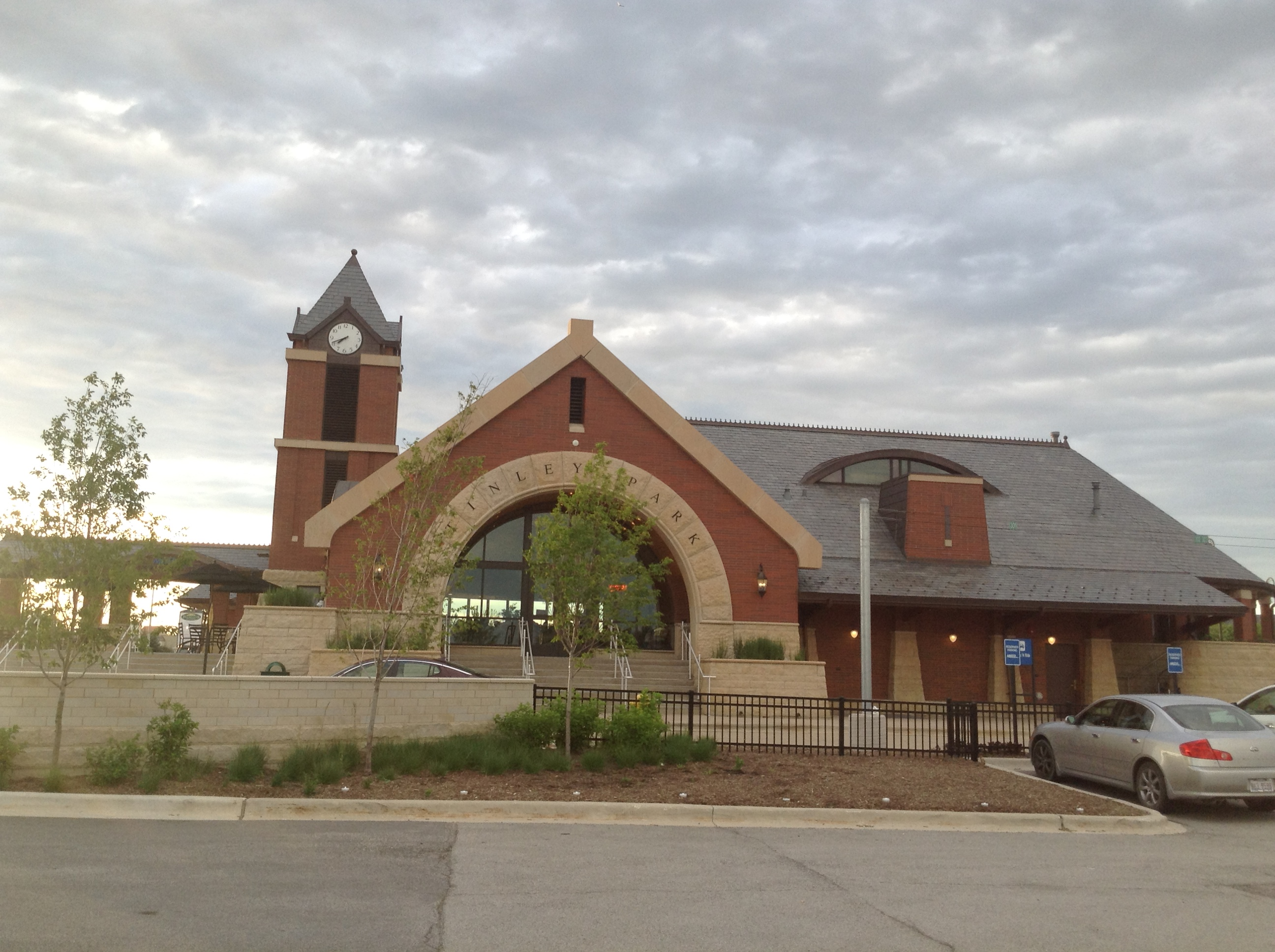
Tinley Park–80th Avenue station is one of two Metra stations in the village.

Metra trains access Tinley Park via the Rock Island District. There are two train stations in the village–Tinley Park station on Oak Park Avenue and 80th Avenue station. Pace provides bus service on Routes 356, 364 and 386 connecting Tinley Park to destinations throughout the Southland.

- I-80 the village's east–west thoroughfare.
- IL 43 (Harlem Avenue), the village's major north–south throughfare.
- US 45 (La Grange Road) on the western corner of the village.
- US 6 (159th Street) on the northern corner of the village.
- CR W32 (80th Avenue) the village's major north–south thoroughfare in Cook County.
- CR 84 (191st Street) the village's second major east–west thoroughfare.
- CR B60 (171st Street) located entirely in Tinley Park.

== Notable people ==
- Emil Andres, Indy and Sprint car driver
- Gary Bettenhausen, Indy and Sprint car driver
- Merle Bettenhausen, Sprint car driver
- Tony Bettenhausen, Indy car driver
- Tony Bettenhausen Jr., Indy car driver
- Miles Boykin, wide receiver for NFL's Chicago Bears
- Tevin Coleman, running back for NFL's Atlanta Falcons, San Francisco 49ers, New York Jets
- John Ericks, pitcher with Pittsburgh Pirates 1995–97
- Armando Estrada, former wrestler with WWE
- Nathan Everhart, wrestler with WWE
- Gina Glocksen, season six finalist on American Idol
- Michael Hastings, Illinois State Senator, 98th General Assembly
- Garrett Jones, outfielder, first baseman with Minnesota Twins, Pittsburgh Pirates, New York Yankees
- Stacie Juris, Miss Illinois Teen USA 2009 and Miss Illinois USA 2013
- Christine Magnuson, Olympic swimmer (two-time silver medalist)
- Real Friends, pop punk band
- Kevin Sefcik, utility player with Philadelphia Phillies and Colorado Rockies
- John J. Szaton, Polish-American sculptor and creator of Coal Miner
- Kanye West, musician, rapper, singer, songwriter, record producer, and fashion designer.
- Jeremiah Wright, former minister to Barack Obama

== Sister cities ==
- Büdingen, Germany
- Mallow, Ireland
- Nowy Sącz, Poland
