= Mokena, Illinois =

Village of Mokena
- Village
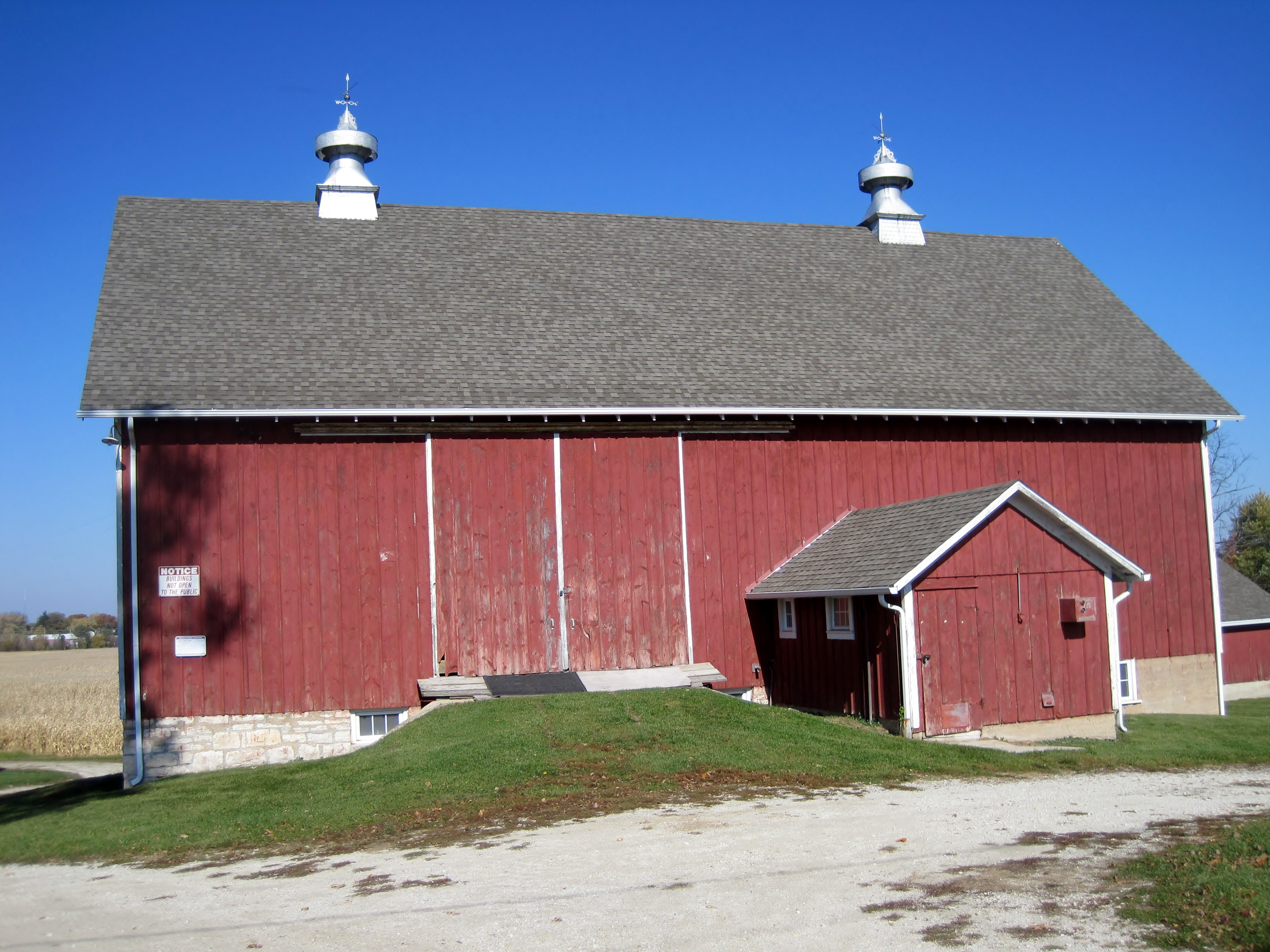
- The gable bank barn at the historic McGovney–Yunker Farmstead

- Flag Seal
- Motto(s): Planned Progress, Pleasant Living
- Location of Mokena in Will County, Illinois.

- Location of Illinois in the United States
- Coordinates: 41.534414°N 87.876873°W
- Country: United States
- State: Illinois
- County: Will
- Township: Frankfort, New Lenox
- Incorporated: 1880

Government
  - Type: Village

Area
  - Total: 8.68 sq mi (22.47 km^{2})
  - Land: 8.68 sq mi (22.47 km^{2})
  - Water: 0 sq mi (0.00 km^{2})

Population (2020)
  - Total: 19,887
  - Density: 2,292.3/sq mi (885.05/km^{2})
- Time zone: UTC-6 (CST)
  - Summer (DST): UTC-5 (CDT)
- ZIP code: 60448
- Area codes: 708
- FIPS code: 17-49854
- Website: http://www.mokena.org/

Mokena (/moʊˈkinə/ moh-KEE-nuh) is a village in Will County, Illinois, United States. It is a southwest suburb of Chicago. The population was 19,887 at the 2020 census. The Census Bureau's 2019 estimate found that the population had increased to 20,159.

== Etymology ==
Mokena is a name apparently derived from a Native American language meaning "mud turtle". While the particular language from which the name originates is not documented, likely candidates are Anishinaabemowin, whose word for "snapping turtle" is mikinaak, and its close sister language Potawatomi, in which the same animal is called mkenak. Both languages were once spoken in the area now occupied by the town.

Mokena is located at 41°32′4″N 87°52′37″W. According to the 2010 census, Mokena has an area of 8.893 square miles (23.03 km^{2}), of which 8.89 square miles (23.02 km^{2}) (or 99.97%) is land and 0.003 square miles (0.01 km^{2}) (or 0.03%) is water. It is bordered by Tinley Park to the northeast, Orland Park to the north, Homer Glen to the northwest, Frankfort to the south, and New Lenox to the west.

== Education ==
Elementary school services are provided by one of four school districts: Mokena School District 159, New Lenox School District 122, Frankfort School District 157C, and Summit Hill School District 161. Schools within District 159 include MES (Mokena Elementary School), MIS (Mokena Intermediate School), and MJHS (Mokena Junior High School). Mokena is served by Lincoln-Way Community High School District 210; students living in districts 159 or 122 attend Lincoln-Way Central High School, and students living in districts 157C or 161 attend Lincoln-Way East High School. Higher education is provided at Joliet Junior College, the nation's first public community college, and at Rasmussen College.

== Demographics ==
Historical population
Census	Pop.	Note	%±
1880	522		—
1890	364		−30.3%
1900	281		−22.8%
1910	359		27.8%
1920	475		32.3%
1930	562		18.3%
1940	657		16.9%
1950	903		37.4%
1960	1,332		47.5%
1970	1,643		23.3%
1980	4,578		178.6%
1990	6,128		33.9%
2000	14,583		138.0%
2010	18,740		28.5%
2020	19,887		6.1%
U.S. Decennial Census

=== Racial and ethnic composition ===
Mokena village, Illinois – Racial and ethnic composition Note: the US Census treats Hispanic/Latino as an ethnic category. This table excludes Latinos from the racial categories and assigns them to a separate category. Hispanics/Latinos may be of any race.
Race / Ethnicity (NH = Non-Hispanic)	Pop 2000	Pop 2010	Pop 2020	% 2000	% 2010	% 2020
White alone (NH)	13,812	17,046	17,317	94.71%	90.96%	87.08%
Black or African American alone (NH)	71	238	347	0.49%	1.27%	1.74%
Native American or Alaska Native alone (NH)	8	21	14	0.05%	0.11%	0.07%
Asian alone (NH)	183	381	398	1.25%	2.03%	2.00%
Native Hawaiian or Pacific Islander alone (NH)	5	5	2	0.03%	0.03%	0.01%
Other race alone (NH)	5	4	25	0.03%	0.02%	0.13%
Mixed race or Multiracial (NH)	78	142	470	0.53%	0.76%	2.36%
Hispanic or Latino (any race)	421	903	1,314	2.89%	4.82%	6.61%
Total	14,583	18,740	19,887	100.00%	100.00%	100.00%

=== 2020 census ===
As of the 2020 census, Mokena had a population of 19,887. The median age was 42.7 years. 22.5% of residents were under the age of 18 and 17.3% of residents were 65 years of age or older. For every 100 females, there were 97.1 males, and for every 100 females age 18 and over, there were 93.8 males age 18 and over.

100.0% of residents lived in urban areas, while 0.0% lived in rural areas.

There were 7,198 households in Mokena, of which 32.5% had children under the age of 18 living in them. Of all households, 64.8% were married-couple households, 11.8% were households with a male householder and no spouse or partner present, and 19.4% were households with a female householder and no spouse or partner present. About 19.7% of all households were made up of individuals and 9.3% had someone living alone who was 65 years of age or older.

There were 7,394 housing units, of which 2.7% were vacant. The homeowner vacancy rate was 1.0% and the rental vacancy rate was 5.7%.

=== 2010 census ===
As of the census of 2010, there were 18,740 people, 6,358 households, and 5,120 families residing in the village. The population density was 2,432.4 inhabitants per square mile (939.2/km^{2}). There were 4,848 housing units at an average density of 808.6 per square mile (312.2/km^{2}). The racial makeup of the village was 94.5% White, 1.3% African American, 0.01% Native American, 2.0% Asian, 0.01% Pacific Islander, 0.9% from other races, and 0.63% from two or more races. Hispanic or Latino of any race were 4.8% of the population.

=== 2000 census ===
As of the census of 2000, there were 4,703 households, out of which 48.5% had children under the age of 18 living with them, 73.7% were married couples living together, 7.3% had a female householder with no husband present, and 16.8% were non-families. 14.0% of all households were made up of individuals, and 3.3% had someone living alone who was 65 years of age or older. The average household size was 3.10 and the average family size was 3.46.

In the village, the population was spread out, with 32.4% under the age of 18, 7.1% from 18 to 24, 32.7% from 25 to 44, 21.5% from 45 to 64, and 6.2% who were 65 years of age or older. The median age was 34 years. For every 100 females, there were 101.5 males. For every 100 females age 18 and over, there were 97.3 males.

=== Income and poverty ===
The median family income is $82,596 and the median income for a household is $91,817. Males had a median income of $58,226 versus $31,522 for females. The per capita income for the village was $31,944. As of 2008, the median house value was $350,130, up from $211,300 in 2000.

About 0.7% of families and 1.0% of the population were below the poverty line, including 0.6% of those under age 18 and 4.6% of those age 65 or over.

== Transportation ==
The Village of Mokena is serviced by the Metra rail service Rock Island District. Mokena has two commuter rail stations, Hickory Creek and Front Street, providing service to downtown Chicago's LaSalle Street Station, connecting with components of the Chicago Transit Authority. Mokena is also served by I-80, which runs along its northern border. Through I-80 commuters have convenient access to I-355 (Veteran's Memorial Tollway) and I-57. The main north–south thoroughfares are US Route 45 (LaGrange Rd) and Wolf Rd. The main east–west thoroughfares are 191st St, LaPorte Rd., and US Route 30 (Lincoln Highway). Rail freight traffic travels along both the Metra RI District Railway (Metra RI) and the Canadian National Railway (CN). The CN tracks run east/west along Mokena's southern boundary, while the Metra Rock Island District (Metra) tracks approximately bisect the town in a northeastern/southwestern direction.

== Notable people ==
- Denise Richards, model and actress, lived in Mokena
- Mariano Sori-Marin, former Linebacker at the Minnesota Golden Gophers from 2018-2022; Linebackers Coach at the Minnesota Golden Gophers
- Dean Anna, former MLB player; born in Mokena
- James Augustine, former University of Illinois and NBA player
- Bryan Rekar, former MLB pitcher for the Colorado Rockies and Tampa Bay Rays
- Terry Boers, sports radio host and Chicago Sun-Times columnist
- Exene Cervenka, singer and writer; grew up in Mokena
- Karla DeVito, actress, voice actress, and singer; born in Mokena
- Clay Guida, mixed martial artist, Jason's brother
- Jason Guida, mixed martial artist, Clay's brother
- Don C. Hall, state actor and Wisconsin state legislator; lived in Mokena
- Ron Kittle, former MLB player, lives in Mokena
- Bob Strait, racing driver; born in Mokena
