= Hazel Crest, Illinois =

- Village
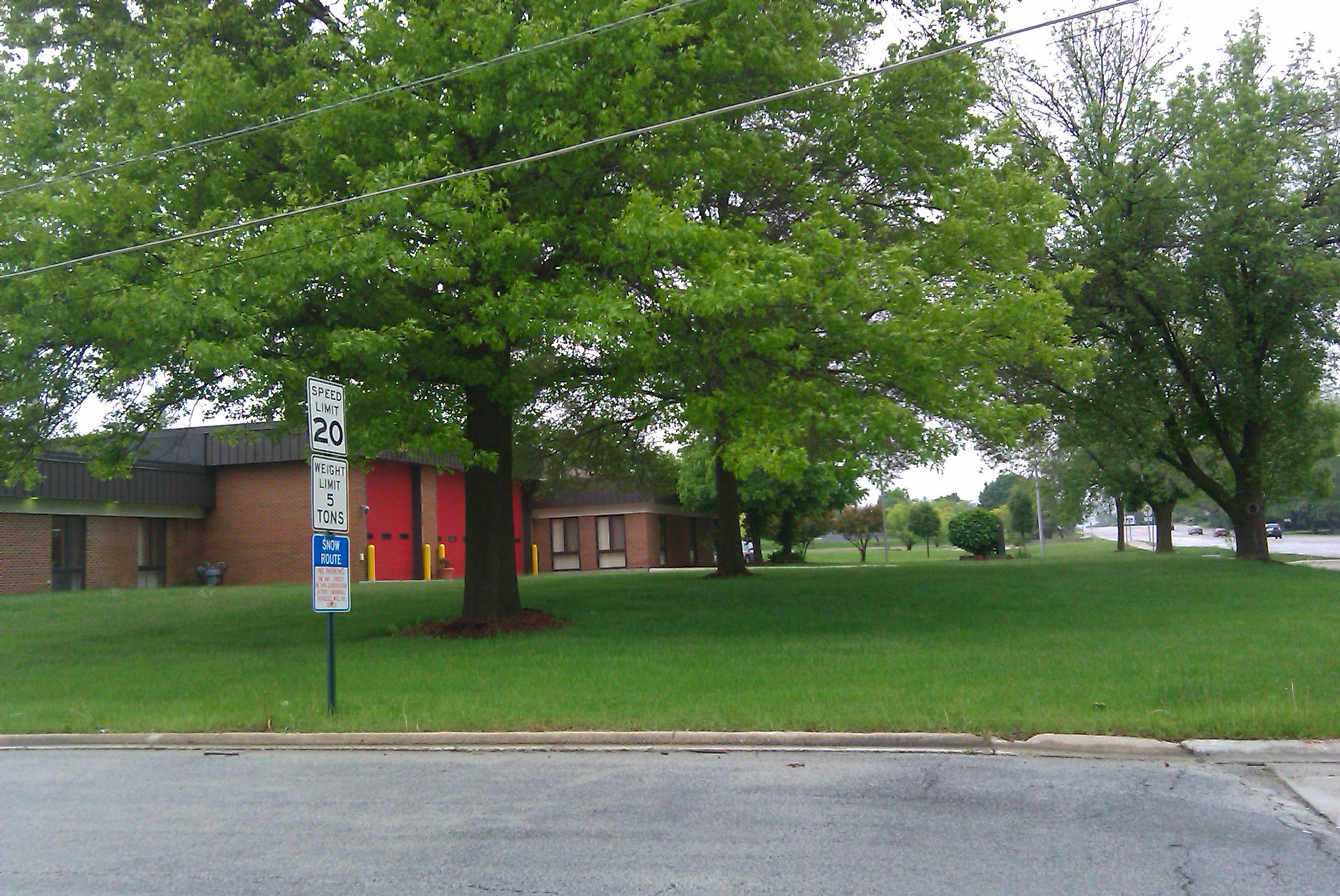
- Hazel Crest Fire Department

- Logo

- Location of Hazel Crest in Cook County, Illinois.

- Location within Greater Chicago Location within Illinois Location within the United States
- Coordinates: 41°34′23″N 87°41′9″W
- Country: United States
- State: Illinois
- County: Cook
- Townships: Bremen, Rich, Thornton
- Incorporated: 1911

Government
  - Type: Council–manager
  - Mayor: Sandra Alexander

Area
  - Total: 3.42 sq mi (8.85 km^{2})
  - Land: 3.40 sq mi (8.80 km^{2})
  - Water: 0.019 sq mi (0.05 km^{2}) 0.59%

Population (2020)
  - Total: 13,382
  - Density: 3,938.8/sq mi (1,520.78/km^{2})

Standard of living
  - Per capita income: $24,424
  - Median home value: $103,200
- ZIP code(s): 60429
- Area code(s): 708
- Geocode: 33695
- FIPS code: 17-33695
- Website: www.villageofhazelcrest.com

Hazel Crest is a village in Cook County, Illinois, United States. The population was 13,382 at the 2020 census. It is a south suburb of Chicago.

== History ==
Hazel Crest was first settled in 1870 in a farming community known as South Harvey. An enterprising newspaper editor named William McClintock moved here from Ohio in 1890, buying 80 acres (320,000 m^{2}) from farmer Fred Puhrman, McClintock named the town South Harvey, and the town would receive its modern name in 1895, after a referendum.

McClintock built a depot for a local milk train and subsequently opened transportation opportunities to Chicago and beyond. The depot also served as the area's first real estate office, public meeting place, Sunday school, day school, and post office.

In 1900, the name was changed to Hazel Crest to reflect the large numbers of hazelnut bushes that grew on a rise of land just south of town. At the time, the southern border was 175th Street and the western edge of the village was Kedzie Avenue.

Hazel Crest was incorporated in 1912. Many of the families of the early residents still live in the village.

Later on, the city would see the construction of a Community Church in 1894, then a 1984 adaptation of an elementary school building which has now become the Martin J. Kauchak Municipal Center, named for President Kauchak who served the village for twenty years (1973–1993).

== Geography ==
Hazel Crest is located at 41°34′23″N 87°41′09″W. The village is primarily located in Bremen Township, while the portion of the village south of 183rd Street is located in Rich Township and the portion east of I-80/94 is in Thornton Township. The village is located near Chicago in an area known as the Chicago Southland and is approximately 25 miles (40 km) south of the Chicago Loop.

The village is bordered by Markham to the north, Harvey to the northeast, East Hazel Crest to the east, Homewood to the southeast, Flossmoor to the south and Country Club Hills to the west.

According to the 2021 census gazetteer files, Hazel Crest has a total area of 3.42 square miles (8.86 km^{2}), of which 3.40 square miles (8.81 km^{2}) (or 99.39%) is land and 0.02 square miles (0.05 km^{2}) (or 0.61%) is water.

The village lies on the Tinley Moraine.

== Demographics ==
Historical population
Census	Pop.	Note	%±
1920	438		—
1930	1,162		165.3%
1940	1,299		11.8%
1950	2,129		63.9%
1960	6,205		191.5%
1970	10,329		66.5%
1980	13,973		35.3%
1990	13,334		−4.6%
2000	14,816		11.1%
2010	14,100		−4.8%
2020	13,382		−5.1%
U.S. Decennial Census; 2010 2020

=== Racial and ethnic composition ===
Hazel Crest, Illinois – Racial and ethnic composition Note: the US Census treats Hispanic/Latino as an ethnic category. This table excludes Latinos from the racial categories and assigns them to a separate category. Hispanics/Latinos may be of any race.
Race / Ethnicity (NH = Non-Hispanic)	Pop 2000	Pop 2010	Pop 2020	% 2000	% 2010	% 2020
White alone (NH)	2,708	1,269	758	18.28%	9.00%	5.66%
Black or African American alone (NH)	11,227	11,935	11,441	75.78%	84.65%	85.50%
Native American or Alaska Native alone (NH)	16	26	17	0.11%	0.18%	0.13%
Asian alone (NH)	138	91	49	0.93%	0.65%	0.37%
Pacific Islander alone (NH)	3	0	3	0.02%	0.00%	0.02%
Other race alone (NH)	15	20	68	0.10%	0.14%	0.51%
Mixed race or Multiracial (NH)	215	232	304	1.45%	1.65%	2.27%
Hispanic or Latino (any race)	494	527	742	3.33%	3.74%	5.54%
Total	14,816	14,100	13,382	100.00%	100.00%	100.00%

=== 2020 census ===
As of the 2020 census, Hazel Crest had a population of 13,382. The median age was 39.2 years. 24.5% of residents were under the age of 18 and 17.9% of residents were 65 years of age or older. For every 100 females there were 81.5 males, and for every 100 females age 18 and over there were 74.9 males age 18 and over.

100.0% of residents lived in urban areas, while 0.0% lived in rural areas.

There were 4,815 households in Hazel Crest, of which 34.4% had children under the age of 18 living in them. Of all households, 29.8% were married-couple households, 16.0% were households with a male householder and no spouse or partner present, and 48.8% were households with a female householder and no spouse or partner present. About 28.3% of all households were made up of individuals and 13.0% had someone living alone who was 65 years of age or older.

There were 5,307 housing units, of which 9.3% were vacant. The homeowner vacancy rate was 2.4% and the rental vacancy rate was 11.5%.

=== Demographic estimates ===
In data.census.gov profile estimates, there were 3,327 families residing in the village. The population density was 3,915.16 inhabitants per square mile (1,511.65/km^{2}), and the housing unit density was 1,552.66 per square mile (599.49/km^{2}).

In the same estimates, 33.61% of households were non-families. The average household size was 3.49 and the average family size was 2.77.

The estimated age distribution included 6.4% from 18 to 24, 23.8% from 25 to 44, and 25.6% from 45 to 64.

=== Income and poverty ===
The median income for a household in the village was $55,010, and the median income for a family was $65,477. Males had a median income of $36,922 versus $37,535 for females. The per capita income for the village was $29,372. About 17.0% of families and 15.4% of the population were below the poverty line, including 21.7% of those under age 18 and 7.7% of those age 65 or over.

== Government ==
=== Village board ===
- Village President / Local Liquor Commissioner Sandra Alexander (elected 2025)
- Clerk Jadie Peters (elected 2025)
- Trustee Sandra Slayton (elected 2015)
- Trustee Jonathan L. Cooper (elected 2025)
- Trustee Carmilla Malone (elected 2023)
- Trustee Marquita D. Marshall Motley (elected 2025)
- Trustee Merle Kimbrough-Huckabee (elected 2025)
- Trustee Mia C.Reed (appointed 2025; vacancy created my the election of Sandra Alexander as mayor)
- Village Manager(Interim) Donna Gayden

The village holds elections every odd-numbered year with all officials being elected at-large.

Terms for the village board are staggered, with the village president, village clerk and three trustees elected one year and the remaining three trustees elected two years following.

=== Federal ===
United States House of Representatives

- Congresswoman Robin Kelly D-Chicago, Illinois's 2nd congressional district

United States Senate

- Senator Dick Durbin D-Illinois (elected 1997)
- Senator Tammy Duckworth D-Illinois (elected 2017)

=== State legislature ===
Illinois State Senate

- State Senator Napoleon Harris D-Flossmoor, Illinois, 15th Legislative District (covers portions of the village east of I-80/94)
- State Senator Michael Hastings D-Tinley Park, Illinois, 19th Legislative District

Illinois State House of Representatives

- State Representative Will Davis D-East Hazel Crest, 30th Representative District (covers portions of the village east of I-80/94)
- State Representative Debbie Meyers-Martin D-Hazel Crest, 38th Representative District

== Transportation ==
Several modes of transportation serve the village of Hazel Crest. To the east, in Hazel Crest proper, are portions of the Canadian National Railway (former Illinois Central Railroad) intermodal facility. Along the train tracks is the Metra Electric District. Hazel Crest station moves commuters either north to downtown Chicago at Millennium Station or south to University Park, the last stop on the line.

Hazel Crest is the locale where Interstate 80 merges with the Tri-State Tollway (Interstate 294).

The village also has an extensive array of state highways. The intersection of 175th Street and Kedzie Avenue is located at the center of the village. 167th Street intersects with Kedzie Avenue on the north side of the village, and Kedzie Avenue also intersects at 183rd Street to the south; all are divided four-lane highways except for 167th Street before intersecting at Park Avenue.

Major arteries

- 167th Street
- 175th Street
- 183rd Street
- Kedzie Avenue
- Pulaski Road (Crawford Avenue)
- Wood Street
- Dixie Highway
- Governors Highway

Pace bus routes

- Route 750 – Country Club Hills

Provides rush hour feeder service from Country Club Hills to the Flossmoor Metra Station.

- Route 356 – Harvey-Homewood-Tinley Park

Provides daily service connecting Harvey, Markham, Homewood, Hazel Crest, Country Club Hills and Tinley Park via Park, 159th, Wood, Dixie and 183rd Street between the Harvey Transportation Center and the Tinley Park Mental Health Center.

- Route 359 – Robbins/South Kedzie Avenue

North–south route which operates from Homewood Metra Station to 95th/Dan Ryan (CTA) Station. Also serves the Blue Island Metra/Electric Station, Metro South Medical Center, Markham Courthouse, South Suburban Hospital, Lydia Health Care Center, Waterford Estates and Grenoble Square Shopping Center. Between CTA Red Line 95th St. & 124th/Halsted, buses serve posted stops only.

- Route 460 – Hazel Crest Feeder – ROUTE ELIMINATED as of February 8, 2010.
- Route 354 – Harvey-Oak Forest Loop

Clockwise and counter-clockwise loop service from the Harvey Transportation Center on 147th St, Cicero, 167th St, Dixie and 154th St through Harvey, Dixmoor, Posen, Midlothian, Oak Forest, Country Club Hills, Hazel Crest and Markham. Route provides direct service to South Suburban College's University and College Center in Oak Forest and also serves Pace South Division.

In addition, through Pace (transit), Hazel Crest offers Dial-A-Ride services, provided primarily to elderly and disabled residents for low fares.

== Population and employment ==
The Chicago Metropolitan Agency for Planning (CMAP), projects that by 2030, Hazel Crest will have 15,786 residents and 3,570 jobs compared to the 2000 U.S. census estimate of 14,816 and 2,933 respectively. Major employers in the village include:

- Mi-Jack
- Advocate South Suburban Hospital
- Graycor Construction
- Giercyzk Real Estate
- Waterford Estates Retirement

Two of the companies listed above are located within the Palmer Lake Corporate Business Park at 175th Street and Governors Highway.

== Education ==
Hazel Crest is served by three school districts: Prairie-Hills School District 144, Hazel Crest School District 152.5, and Flossmoor School District 161. Three high school districts serve the village:

- Bremen Community High School District 228
- Homewood-Flossmoor Community High School District 233
- Thornton Township High Schools District 205

Elementary schools

School District 144 operates Mae Jemison Elementary School, Highlands Elementary School, and Chateaux Elementary School in Hazel Crest and six others in surrounding suburbs. School District 152.5 operates Woodland Elementary School and Warren Palm School in Hazel Crest. The district also has schools in neighboring suburbs. School District 161 operates five elementary schools outside that serve the village, primarily neighborhoods south of 183rd Street.

Middle Schools

School District 144 operates Prairie-Hills Junior High School (which serves most of the village), located in Markham. School District 152.5 operates Robert Frost Middle School (which serves those east of California Ave.), also in Markham. School District 161 operates Parker Junior High School (which serves those south of 183rd St.), located in Flossmoor. There are no middle schools in Hazel Crest.

High schools

There are no high schools in Hazel Crest. High School District 205 operates three high schools: Thornton Township High School, Thornwood High School (which village residents east of California Avenue attend), and Thornridge High School. High School District 228 operates four high schools: Hillcrest High School, a combination of the names (Country Club Hills and Hazel Crest) in neighboring Country Club Hills (where the majority of Hazel Crest high school students attend), Bremen High School in Midlothian, Oak Forest High School in Oak Forest, and Tinley Park High School in Tinley Park. High School District 233 operates one high school, Homewood-Flossmoor High School in Flossmoor, which serves students residing in the village south of 175th Street.

Community colleges

Hazel Crest sits in two community college districts, South Suburban College in South Holland and Prairie State College in Chicago Heights.

Residents living north of 183rd Street reside in South Suburban Community College District 510, and those living south of 183rd Street reside in Prairie State Community College District 515.

== Housing ==
There are a number of subdivisions in Hazel Crest, most of which were constructed between the 1950s and 1980s. The largest within the village are Hazel Crest Proper, the oldest portion and original section of the village; Chateaux/Versailles, located just northwest of 183rd Street and Kedzie Avenue; Pottawatomie Hills/Twin Creeks, located just northeast of 175th Street and Kedzie Avenue; Highlands, located just northwest of 175th Street and Kedzie Avenue; Dynasty Lakes/Village West, just southwest of 183rd Street and Kedzie Avenue; and Pacesetter/Stonebridge/Carriage Hills, located southeast of 175th Street and Kedzie Avenue.

There are numerous condominiums in Hazel Crest; English Valley, Stonebridge, Gingko, Ironwood, and Water's Edge Condominiums range from $100,000 to $250,000 in pricing.

Hazel Crest has a multitude of dwellings in the form of single-family homes, apartments, townhomes and condominiums.

Housing prices range anywhere from $30,000 to $450,000.

== Hospital ==
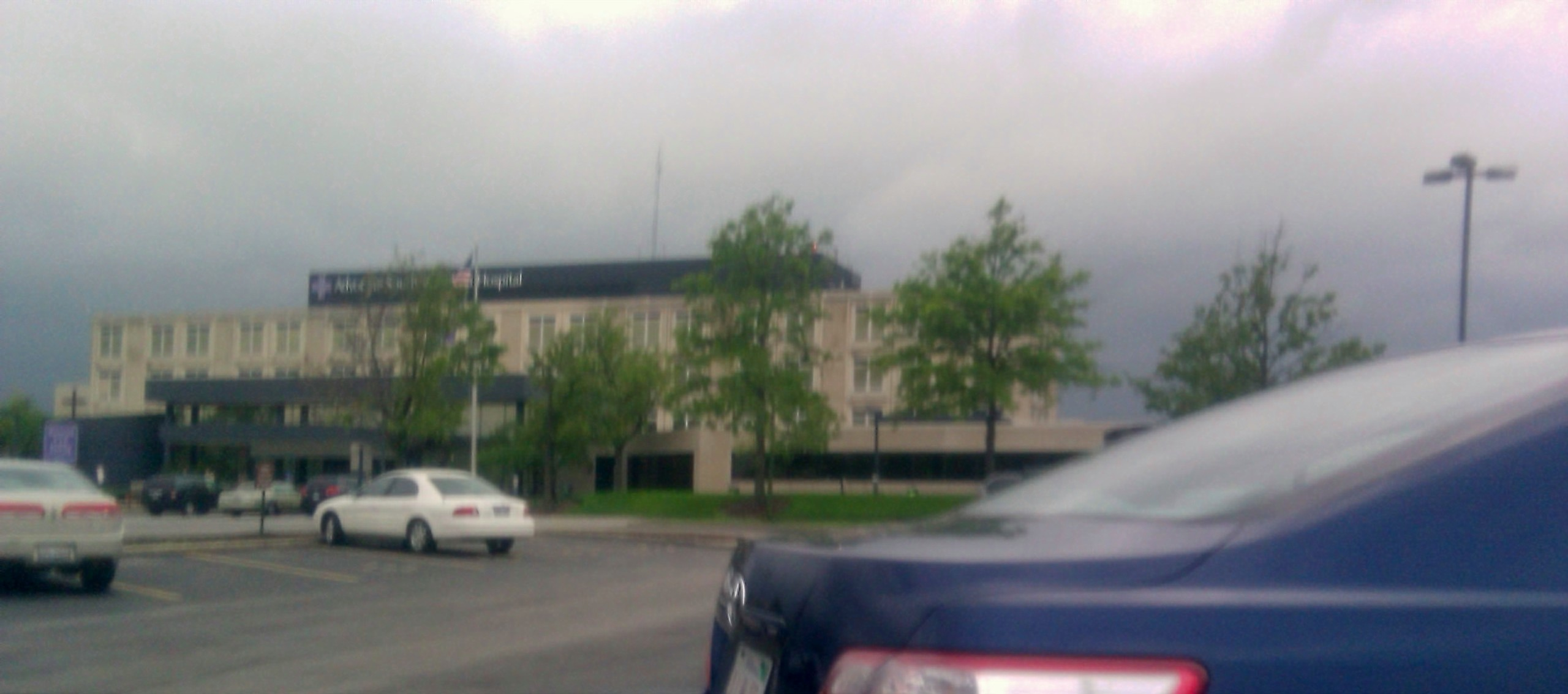
Advocate South Suburban Hospital 17800 Kedzie Avenue

Hazel Crest is home to the not-for-profit Advocate South Suburban Hospital, one of numerous hospitals owned and operated by Advocate Health Care, the state's largest hospital system. Advocate South Suburban Hospital is a 284-bed, acute care facility with nearly 400 doctors on staff. More than 1,000 newborn babies are delivered at its maternity center, which is a state-designated Level II+ perinatal hospital and provides 24-hour care for high-risk babies.

The hospital was once located at 171st Street and Dixie Highway in the original section of the village and opened in 1946 as Hazel Crest General Hospital with 16 beds. In 1971, the hospital opened at its current location at 17800 Kedzie Avenue, north of the village's Chateaux/Versailles neighborhood. The hospital merged with Advocate Health Care in 1996 and became Advocate South Suburban Hospital. In 2005, the hospital underwent a $20 million expansion project. In addition, the hospital broke ground on construction of its new, multimillion-dollar cardiac catheterization laboratory and is renovating its current laboratory with new state-of-the-art equipment.

== Library ==
Hazel Crest is part of the Grande Prairie Public Library District, which also includes the neighboring city of Country Club Hills. Grande Prairie Public Library is located at 3479 W. 183rd in Hazel Crest. The library is a member of the Metropolitan Library System. Residents of Hazel Crest and Country Club Hills are eligible for a free library card and numerous programs held by the library. In 2009, the library celebrated its 35th anniversary. The Library District is governed by a seven-member Board of Trustees, elected at-large between Country Club Hills and Hazel Crest.

== Parks and recreation ==
Parks in the village are operated by the Hazel Crest Park District, which is coterminous with the village boundaries but maintains separate governance and a five-member Board of Commissioners elected at-large during consolidated elections. The Park District operates more than 200 acres (0.81 km^{2}) of parks and provides recreational programming for the district's residents. The Park District celebrated its 50-year anniversary in 2007.
