= Oak Forest High School =

Public high school in Illinois, United States

Location
- 15201 S. Central Avenue; Oak Forest, Illinois 60452; United States; 41.61562°N 87.756232°W

Information
- School type: Public Secondary
- Motto: Academics plus Activities equal Excellence
- Opened: 1971
- School district: Bremen High School District 228
- Superintendent: Brad Sikora
- Principal: Jane Dempsey
- Teaching staff: 88.00 (FTE)
- Grades: 9–12
- Gender: Coed
- Enrollment: 1,361 (2023-2024)
- Average class size: 24.2
- Student to teacher ratio: 15.47
- Campus: Suburban
- Colors: Black; Vegas Gold
- Athletics conference: South Suburban Conference
- Nickname: Bengals
- Publication: Vedas
- Yearbook: Safari
- Communities served: Oak Forest, Country Club Hills, Crestwood, Hazel Crest, Markham, Midlothian
- Website: oakforest.bhsd228.com

Oak Forest High School is a public high school located in Oak Forest, Illinois. It is part of Bremen Community High School District 228 which also includes Tinley Park High School, Hillcrest High School and Bremen High School. It serves most of the community of Oak Forest, as well as portions of Midlothian and Crestwood in Bremen Township in the south suburbs of Chicago in Cook County.

== History ==
In March 1968, taxpayers of District 228 approved a US$1.3 million loan from the Illinois School Building Commission to begin first phase construction of the district's fourth high school. In August 1968, the Board of Education approved the new school's name, and in September, the architectural plans were approved. The construction contract was approved in March 1969, with the plan calling for an initial "first phase" of construction, and a second phase to be added on if necessary.

Oak Forest High School opened in 1971 as a remedy to the excessively high numbers of students attending the three other existing high schools in the district. Before the school had even opened, it became clear that the school would not be sufficient to contain the increasing student population. The district again turned to voters to approve a bond issue to add onto the school. After two failures, and threats of students needing to attend double shifts, the bond issue passed in December 1971.

On December 2, 1985, a fire broke out at the school causing severe damage to the school's electric systems. After missing a week of school, and with the building still inhabitable, Oak Forest students were required to temporarily attend classes at Tinley Park High School with split shifts set up (Tinley Park students from 7 am to noon, and Oak Forest students from 12:40 to 6 pm).

Construction to the building in the summer of 2005 created a new Instructional Materials Center (IMC), which serves as media lab and library. Additionally, the space occupied by the old IMC was re-structured into additional classrooms, a move towards solving the approaching five-year deadline of the outdoor portable classroom mobile units (commonly referred to as the "trailers").

== Academics ==
In 2007, Oak Forest High School had an average ACT score of 21.2 and graduated 97.3% of its senior class. The average class size was 20.2.

In accordance with the federal No Child Left Behind Act, Oak Forest has achieved Adequate Yearly Progress (AYP). The school has no subgroups that meet the minimum number to be included in testing.

As of January 17, 2022, OFHS has a rating of 9/10 on GreatSchools.

== Athletics ==
Oak Forest is a member of the South Suburban Conference, with its teams named as the Bengals. The school's teams participate in state championship tournaments sponsored by the Illinois High School Association (IHSA).

The school sponsors interscholastic teams for boys and girls in basketball, bowling, cross country, golf, soccer, swimming and diving, tennis, track and field, and volleyball. Boys may also compete in baseball, football, wrestling, while Girls may also compete in badminton, and softball. There are also district water polo and lacrosse teams which students from Oak Forest, Bremen, Hillcrest, and Tinley Park High Schools collectively compete.

The following teams placed in the top four of their respective class in their respective sports in IHSA sponsored state championship series:

- Baseball: State Champions (1984–85)
- Cheerleading: State Champions (2015–16, 2020–21)
- Softball: State Champions (2008–09)

== Notable alumni ==
- Daniel Martin (class of 1995) is an American magician and entertainer. His performances combine magic, psychological illusion, and improvisational comedy.
- David Vox Mullen (class of 1996) is an American comedian and film producer, known for producing the documentary The Herro's Journey: A Pro Wrestling Story.
- Bob O'Dekirk (class of 1987) was the mayor of Joliet, Illinois from 2015-2023.
- Tim Byrdak (class of 1991) is a Major League Baseball relief pitcher (1998–2000, 2005–2013).
- Jason Frasor (class of 1995) is a Major League Baseball relief pitcher (2004–present) with the Kansas City Royals.
- Rick Gorecki (class of 1991) is a former Major League Baseball pitcher. (1997–98).
- Jimmy Pardo (class of 1984) is a professional comedian.
- Kylie Rae (class of 2010) is an American professional wrestler who signed with Total Nonstop Action Wrestling.
- Tevin Coleman (class of 2012) is an American football running back who plays for the New York Jets National Football League (NFL).
- Kyle Funkhouser (class of 2012) is a baseball pitcher who was drafted by the Detroit Tigers in 2016.
- Robbie Avila (class of 2022) is known for playing basketball at Indiana State University and St. Louis University, where he became a viral sensation during the 2023–24 season.
- Mike Stoklasa (class of 1996), founder of the popular YouTube channel RedLetterMedia.
- George Saunders (class of 1977), Author of Tenth of December, Lincoln in the Bardo, (both of which were named New York Times Bestsellers) and numerous other titles.
