= History of Midlothian, Illinois =

Like many southwest suburbs of Chicago in the 1800s and early 1900s, the area now known as the Village of Midlothian consisted of a few area farmers being surrounded by large and small endeavors alike as the industrial age began its exponential expansion process in the Bremen Township in Cook County, Illinois community.

== The Illinois Central Railroad race to the feds for help ==
By 1854, the sprawling landscape comprising the township of Bremen had a trail of railroad track carrying both passengers and commodities between Chicago and Joliet on the Chicago, Rock Island and Pacific Railroad.

It had been a somewhat brutal battle for the Illinois Central Railroad over the decades, with Stephen A. Douglas and Abraham Lincoln working hard to establish the presence of the Illinois Central Railroad on a State level until Douglas moved to the federal level. By 1850, Douglas was busy working on federally mandated development of transportation plans into law at a federal level for the benefit of the Illinois Central Railroad.

According to the 1976 Bremen High School Bicentennial Book, there is evidence of existing plans to run the Illinois Central Railroad through the property that would eventually become the location of Bremen High School in 1953.

While plans existed as late as 1861 showing not only a surveyed plan for a railroad, a portion of property is set aside with the label "Washington" and nothing more than a relatively square outline around the name and that's it. Although it suggests plans for perhaps a station, there may have been a manufacturer or other business planning to set up shop in this particular location.

Had the Illinois Central Railroad managed to lay down their tracks through Midlothian in the 1850s and 1860s, the history of the Village would most likely look a lot different than what transpired with the one full-time railroad meeting the needs of the public and one temporary one meeting the needs of one of the first formal "members only" country clubs with golf in the nation.

== The private sector pursuit of railroad development ==
While significant time and resources were spent on the planning stages of a railroad through Bremen Township (and subsequently Midlothian) by both Stephens and Douglas, it was members of the private sector relying on approval at a state level to spur the development of a railroad connecting Rockford, Illinois to LaSalle, Illinois. The Rock Island and La Salle Railroad Company was incorporated on February 27, 1847 in the State of Illinois and an amended charter was approved by a special Act of the Illinois Legislature on February 7, 1851 where the name was changed to the Chicago and Rock Island Railroad amongst other modifications to the original corporation.

This approval at a State level came a year after Stephen A. Douglas passed legislation mandating the building of the Illinois Central Railroad on a federal level. The private sector apparently outpaced all existing plans held by their competitor at the time.

The first portion of the railroad connecting Chicago to Joliet was completed by October, 1852 and on October 10, 1852, an American-type locomotive (4-4-0) called the Rocket, was coupled to six newly built yellow coaches. At ten o'clock in the morning the Rocket belched a cloud of wood smoke from its balloon stack and headed west over the 58-pound iron rails that had been imported from England. The trip took two hours and the train was cheered by thousands along the way. It had to make the return trip as a back-up movement because there was yet no turning facilities at Joliet.

On February 22, 1854, the Chicago and Rock Island Railroad became the first railroad to connect Chicago with the Mississippi River.

There is no record of any tracks ever being laid by the Illinois Central Railroad in Midlothian.

== The DuPont connection ==
While commerce began centralizing in what would become Tinley Park, Illinois around the train station in what was once called New Bremen prior to 1892 (including the building of a grain elevator) the Midlothian area remained relatively farm land and untouched by the movement towards a more industrialized existence. The existing whistle stop known originally as Rexford Crossing was considered a milk stop and served local farmers and possibly materials and workers to and from the limestone quarry owned by a William Schwartz of Blue Island where the Secretary of State Midlothian DMV is now situated on Pulaski between 145th and 144th.

Opening in 1894, the DuPont Farm and Ammunition Storage facility had its own track spur off of the Chicago and Rock Island Railroad in between the Rexford Crossing and Oak Forest whistle stops as well as a listing in the train schedule as a recognized station. The primary product manufactured at the location was smokeless gunpowder, which was a clear game-changer in the ammunition industry, as well as forever altering the face of warfare. The DuPont station served as both a passenger drop off and pick up location for staff along with the occasion guest while providing a means to begin their distribution process of their product they were manufacturing.

Explosions were not uncommon in gunpowder factories and storage facilities and 12 years later in 1906, an explosion leveled the DuPont facility. Although there is currently no clear evidence as to the precise location of the facility, apparently the shock-waves from the explosion traveled a decent enough distance in which the windows of the Midlothian Country Club were shattered, according to a report on November 8, 1906 in the Charlotte News. It also appears the Associated Press distributed the geographical location of the facility to be situated in Tinley Park, however a 1900 Homesteader's Map shows the DuPont property to be closer to what would become Oak Forest in 1947 rather than Tinley Park.

Eventually the northern portion of the DuPont Farm and Ammunition Storage property was eventually annexed by the Village of Midlothian, while the rest of the DuPont property was acquired by Cook County, Illinois and developed into what is now the Midlothian Meadows Forest Preserve (part of the Cook County Forest Preserve system)

== The Midlothian - Blue Island Railroad ==
The Village Midlothian acquired a portion of a second railroad for a relatively short period of time, although when the Midlothian Country Club was annexed into the Village, its history became a part of the history of Midlothian not as a next door neighbor, but as a part of the community.

This means the Village of Midlothian with its present-day boundaries had two railroads for approximately 50 years, despite removal of all tracks and equipment in less than 30 years from the date of incorporation of the Midlothian - Blue Island Railroad.

Despite land speculation and sporadic development growing from the direction of what would become the Village of Robbins in 1917, dirt roads continued to act as an uncontrollable barrier to a variety of economic activities, such as delivering goods and services. While rain of any slight measure was a nuisance, it didn't take much to render the roadways virtually unusable by the wagons being pulled by horses.

The extremely and extraordinarily wealthy members of the Midlothian Country Club found such a method of transportation enough of an inconvenience, a group of individuals decided to petition the State of Illinois for a charter to form the Midlothian - Blue Island Railroad and to lay tracks from Blue Island straight to the front lawn of the country club.

Although some records suggest the country club was the owner of the railroad, the Secretary of State for Illinois incorporation papers from 1900 indicate ownership to be in the hands of a group of country club members as individual stockholders rather than the country club as a unique business entity.

The initial charter approved a separate track to begin in Blue Island, Illinois and ending on the Midlothian Country Club grounds. However, the Midlothian - Blue Island Railroad negotiated with the Chicago-Rock Island Railroad to build either the longest spur track or the Shortest Railroad in the World, as it became known as. Rather than laying new rails all the way from Blue Island, they would use Rexford Crossing as a turn around point and then lay track a short distance away to the country club.

As part of the arrangement, a station was erected in place of what constituted Rexford Crossing and the station was renamed to "Midlothian." Although it is unclear who exactly paid for the construction, ownership of the building was eventually acquired by the Chicago, Rock Island and Pacific while the stockholders of the Midlothian - Blue Island Railroad retained ownership of the rails and all of the rights and responsibilities associated with such ownership. All rail cars and engines were purchased by the Midlothian - Blue Island Railroad and not the Chicago, Rock Island and Pacific.

As the years went by, the Midlothian - Blue Island Railroad served only passengers to and from the country club, as it was a private club on private property and was the only known stop along the line. In some ways, this was contrary to the premise that a railroad represented a public highway and although the country club may not have arrested anyone arriving at the station on club property, most had no need to travel to such a destination. In addition, all railroad companies had a variety of police power layers, including conductors being deputized to act as police as the need might arise. Railroad companies could have private security officers patrol property owned by the company and they too, carried police powers.

As the development of the automobile began to spur construction on a variety of levels, including paved roadways, the need for the Midlothian - Blue Island Railroad began to waver. As early as March 1902, the American Automobile Association was formed in Chicago, which eventually spun off the Chicago Motor Club.

By 1909, the Burnham Plan of Chicago was already written, published and distributed across a wide vector of the public as to how the City of Chicago should proceed with its development and growth prospects, especially in light of the advancement of the automobile.

Despite the automobile gaining strength as the favored method of transportation of the masses, the Midlothian - Blue Island Railroad still seemed to remain relevant for a while by eventually switching to an electric rail car. Perhaps this move was considered due to Chicago, Blue Island and Joliet Traction Company announcing plans to extend electrified rails direct from Chicago to Joliet. It is unclear if their mention of a Midlothian "branch" beginning to undergo conversion to electric is referencing the Chicago, Rock Island and Pacific Railroad rails or the Midlothian - Blue Island Railroad rails leading to the country club.

There was an earlier effort to incorporate the Village of Midlothian (minus Bremen Heights, the country club and a few other locations) in 1924, which failed to acquire enough votes.

There is possibility the demands of Chapter 610 - Railroads and Chapter 630 - General of the Illinois Compiled Statutes which deals with the railroads and their responsibility toward government at a localized level may have influenced the eventual closure of the railway by 1928.

Although the club would not be annexed to Midlothian for a few decades, the Midlothian train station was located within the vicinity of the original boundaries for the village and eventually considered a part of the downtown area of Midlothian, which meant some of the tracks were to be governed by the municipal codes of the village. Bremen Township and Cook County may have had property-related laws the company was supposed to adhere to, but even more telling is the absence of the company in a number of Railway and Warehouse Commission annual reports.

By 1927, the Village of Midlothian was incorporated and at the end of the summer season in 1928, the Midlothian - Blue Island Railroad tracks were removed, thereby ending any potential track maintenance issues or conflicts with the village.

== The development of the village of Midlothian ==
=== The first signs of village development ===
By the turn of the century, the Village of Midlothian was still primarily a farming and forested area, despite activities conducted by the Midlothian Country Club creating a short layover for passenger traffic to and from the Midlothian train station. This stalling of development was partially driven by the housing speculation crash after the 1893 World's Columbian's Fair, especially the property that would eventually become the Village of Robbins in 1917.

In addition, a large swath of the southwest suburbs of Chicago can quickly become quite soggy from a variety of sources. Contemplating the odds of a flood or other natural disaster is a common contemplation when considering home ownership. The rolling hills surrounding Midlothian and the creeks running through its fabric have always presented a natural path downward for water to travel without much width to the creeks to contain a heavy and steady rainfall.

Therefore, until paved roads shifted from being a luxury to that of a necessity, families with names such as Woerheide, Largent, William Schwartz, Frank Coole, Benjamin Coole and William J. Shedd all had to contend with commerce-related issues all centering on roads that could be rendered virtually useless in a matter of minutes and potentially last for days.

Even the construction of the train station has not seemed to attract significant passenger traffic over the decades, with little commerce being conducted in Midlothian other than farming, harvesting limestone and gunpowder manufacturing. The first stationmaster was a woman and by 1912, R.K. Cummings was appointed first regular agent of the Chicago, Rock Island and Pacific Railroad. In that same year, Cummings and two monthly ticket holders lived in the vicinity.

==== The subdividing of Midlothian ====
By 1914, a few land developers saw opportunity in subdividing the farms into tracts of land for housing developments. The Arthur T. McIntosh & Co. was one of the first corporations to acquire and then subdivide property in the Village of Midlothian.

==== Economic, religious and social structures takes hold ====
A few commercial buildings began to show up such as the Woerheide Building at 147th and Kolin, home to Sam Wilson's General Store (formerly Peterman's) on the first floor and the second floor was the first home for the St. Christopher Parish in 1924.

On March 24, 1922, St. Christopher Parish opened its pulpit in a rented space to its followers and by September 3, 1924, they opened classrooms in which the first class to graduate in 1925 consisted of three students.

=== Incorporation efforts and first few years ===
The Midlothian Fire Department was organized in 1924, possibly in preparation for the first attempt at incorporating the village. However, for unknown reasons, the proposition was defeated and it wasn't until three years later in 1927 the residents would vote their approval of establishing the Village of Midlothian.

The Village of Midlothian was formally incorporated March 17, 1927. Although there are no clear records on why the name was chosen, there is common conclusion they adopted the name of the train station with perhaps hopes of garnering a sense of similar prestige for the village as was being generated by the golf club at the time, if not also marketing abilities.

The following month, John H. Hamilton was elected as the village's first president and by the end of summer 1928, all of the rails belonging to the Midlothian - Blue Island Railroad were removed, leaving Midlothian with one train line.

By 1929, Midlothian had its first newspaper, The Messenger owned by the Andrews brothers. Kevin McCann was the first Editor In chief of the publication located above the old Largent store located on 147th and Kildare, who later went on to serve as aide-de-camp to General Dwight Eisenhower during World War II as well as working with the General on his two books.

=== 1930s to 1950s - the first few decades ===
In the 1930s and '40s, homes continued to be built for people moving to and settling down in Midlothian. The Kreis Brothers opened the Ford Garage (where the village's fire engine was kept) and Chuck Cavallini began selling ice cream from his corner "Sweet Shop". The Cavallini family would later own and operate the renowned Cavallini's Restaurant - home of the "Chuck Wagon" dinners - which served patrons from Midlothian, surrounding communities and even Chicago for a half century before closing in 1989.

=== Establishing a village hall ===
In 1949, a Village Hall was constructed at the intersection of 148th and Pulaski, where village employees and officials still work out of as of 2020.

As part of the architecture, divisions of the Village such as the police and fire departments are attached to the main building. Across the parking lot along Waverly Avenue is the public works offices and garage while the VFW Hall is across from the entrance to the police department off of Pulaski.

=== Business organizations ===
As talks surrounding annexation of Bremen Heights began in the mid 1950s, there were discussions between the Bremen Heights Business Association and the Midlothian businesspeople as to how they would involve themselves in economic activities should such an effort actually come to reality.

On February 17, 1958, the Midlothian Chamber of Commerce was incorporated as a non-profit organization with Edward S. McPherson as President, Edward Pettijohn as Vice President, James C. McCoyne as Secretary/Manager and Norman Noel as Treasurer. The Chamber then began to absorb the role and responsibilities of the Bremen Heights Business Association, which ceased activities by the early 1960s.
