= Corey McPherrin =

American news anchor

Corey B. McPherrin (born March 10, 1955) is a former sportscaster, news anchor and morning show host best known for his work on WFLD-TV in Chicago from 1995 to 2023.

== Early life and education ==
A native of Markham, Illinois, McPherrin graduated from Hillcrest High School in Country Club Hills, Illinois. He then earned a bachelor's degree in radio and television from Butler University in Indianapolis, where he was president of Butler's chapter of the Sigma Chi fraternity and where he participated on the school's swim team and worked on Butler's radio station, WAJC.

== Professional career ==
McPherrin began his broadcasting career in 1977 at a television station in Davenport, Iowa, and then worked for TV stations in Quincy, Illinois, New Orleans, Denver and Atlanta.

=== WABC-TV ===
In 1984, McPherrin joined WABC-TV in New York City and became WABC's top sports anchor in 1986. McPherrin was on hand for the epic 16 inning long sixth game of the 1986 National League Championship Series between the New York Mets and Houston Astros (which was broadcast on ABC). Although the Astros wound up being eliminated following their 7–6 loss to the Mets in Game 6, Astros' ace pitcher Mike Scott was still named the NLCS' Most Valuable Player. McPherrin interviewed Scott following the trophy presentation.

During the late 1980s, McPherrin delivered in-game updates during ABC's Monday Night Baseball and Thursday Night Baseball broadcasts.

During the first season of ESPN Sunday Night Football (1987), the first game of the package, between the New York Giants and New England Patriots, had WABC (the American Broadcasting Company's flagship station out of New York City) produce a completely separate telecast from ESPN's (rather than an over-the-air station simply simulcasting ESPN's broadcast in the competing teams' home markets). The reason behind this was that WABC's union contract at the time, prohibited non-union workers, such as those at ESPN, from producing live events for WABC. As such, McPherrin would provide play-by-play while Monday Night Football's Frank Gifford and Lynn Swann would serve as his color commentators.

=== WBBM-TV and WFLD-TV (Chicago) ===
In 1991, McPherrin joined WBBM-TV in Chicago as the station's main sports anchor. He remained in that role until 1995, when he was bumped from being WBBM's lead sports anchor by the arrival of Tim Weigel. McPherrin then chose to leave WBBM-TV and join WFLD-TV in Chicago as its lead sports anchor. He appeared with former Chicago Bears player Tom Waddle on The Final Word, a weekly sports review segment. In July 2010, it was announced that McPherrin had been promoted to host Good Day Chicago weekdays from (7 a.m-10 a.m.). He officially retired on August 18, 2023.

== Personal ==
McPherrin and his ex-wife, Sally, have two children, Jack and Margaret. They lived in the Lake View neighborhood on Chicago's North Side. In February 2016, McPherrin listed his Lake View home for sale.
