= Markham, Illinois =

- City
- Seal
- Nickname: Prairie Capital of the Prairie State
- Motto: Unity for the Community
- Location of Markham in Cook County, Illinois.

- Location within Greater Chicago Location within Illinois Location within the United States
- Coordinates: 41°35′51″N 87°41′30″W
- Country: United States
- State: Illinois
- County: Cook
- Townships: Bremen, Thornton
- Incorporated: 1925

Government
  - Mayor: Roger Agpawa

Area
  - Total: 5.41 sq mi (14.00 km^{2})
  - Land: 5.41 sq mi (14.00 km^{2})
  - Water: 0 sq mi (0.00 km^{2}) 0%

Population (2020)
  - Total: 11,661
  - Density: 2,157.5/sq mi (833.01/km^{2})

Standard of living (2007-2011)
  - Per capita income: $19,318
  - Median home value: $120,300
- ZIP code(s): 60428
- Area code(s): 708
- Geocode: 47007
- FIPS code: 17-47007
- Website: www.cityofmarkham.net

Markham is a city and a south suburb of Chicago in Cook County, Illinois, United States. The population was 11,661 at the 2020 census.

== History ==
It is claimed this area was beach 10,000 years ago. After countless ages of geologic swamps, marshes and sloughs, the prairies dominated the landscape with groves of trees, flowers, and wildlife in abundance.

Markham, southwest of the southern tip of Lake Michigan, had been a crossroad for early pioneers. In 1816 a treaty was made with the Ottawa, Chippewa and Potawatomi tribes which ceded a corridor of land located between a point north of the Chicago River and the mouth of the Calumet River to the settlers. The southern boundary, one of two Indian Treaty Boundary Lines, was surveyed along a line from the Kankakee River to Lake Michigan. The line still appears on government maps and now includes a short portion of Interstate 57 near the US 6 interchange northwest of Markham.

The village of Markham was incorporated in 1925 with a population under 300. The village was named for Charles H. Markham, president of the Illinois Central Railroad 1911–1918, 1919–1926. In the mid-1930s, the Croissant Park subdivision was built and increased the population from 349 to 1,388. After World War II, Markham's population doubled to 2,753 residents by 1950. The village developed into a bedroom community as residents sought homes, not industry. An airport developed at 165th Street and Kedzie Avenue was the nearest field outside of Chicago. The airport site was located near what is now the Cook County Sixth Circuit Courthouse. On August 24, 1967, Markham was incorporated as a city.

=== The Lone Pine Tree ===
In 1860, a German immigrant named Lawrence Roesner made his way to the southern boundary and settled on land located in the northwest corner of Markham. He brought with him six seedlings from the Black Forest of Germany and planted them along the Indian Boundary Line. This "Lone Pine Tree" was adopted as the official city symbol in 1985. The lone survivor of six pine trees brought from the Black Forest in 1860 died in 1986. The Markham City Council appropriated money to get a replacement tree from the Black Forest, which the Markham Garden Club planted that year.

== Geography ==
Markham is located at 41°35′51″N 87°41′30″W (41.597467, -87.691570).

According to the 2021 census gazetteer files, Markham has a total area of 5.41 square miles (14.01 km^{2}), all land.

=== Markham Shkode Prairies ===
There are approximately 500 acres (2.0 km^{2}) of virgin and restored prairie land located within the boundary of Markham. There are four prairies known as "Dropseed", "Sundrop", "Paintbrush", and "Gensburg". The prairie is under the supervision of Northeastern Illinois University and The Nature Conservancy. The Gensburg-Markham Prairie portion has been designated a National Natural Landmark. The prairies continue to grow and flourish with the help of the Friends of the Indian Boundary Prairies.

=== Surrounding areas ===
Midlothian / Posen
Midlothian Harvey
Unincorporated Bremen Township Harvey
Oak Forest / Country Club Hills Harvey
Hazel Crest

== Demographics ==
Historical population
Census	Pop.	Note	%±
1930	349		—
1940	1,288		269.1%
1950	2,783		116.1%
1960	11,704		320.6%
1970	15,987		36.6%
1980	15,534		−2.8%
1990	13,136		−15.4%
2000	12,620		−3.9%
2010	12,508		−0.9%
2020	11,661		−6.8%
U.S. Decennial Census; 2010 2020

=== Racial and ethnic composition ===
Markham, Illinois – Racial and ethnic composition Note: the US Census treats Hispanic/Latino as an ethnic category. This table excludes Latinos from the racial categories and assigns them to a separate category. Hispanics/Latinos may be of any race.
Race / Ethnicity (NH = Non-Hispanic)	Pop 1970	Pop 1980	Pop 1990	Pop 2000	Pop 2010	Pop 2020	% 1970	% 1980	% 1990	% 2000	% 2010	% 2020
White alone (NH)	7,946	4,316	2,860	2,062	1,275	823	49.70%	28.45%	21.77%	16.34%	10.19%	7.06%
Black or African American alone (NH)	7,981	10,545	10,045	9,903	10,076	8,420	49.92%	69.50%	76.47%	78.47%	80.56%	72.21%
Native American or Alaska Native alone (NH)	27	25	41	13	15	11	0.17%	0.16%	0.31%	0.10%	0.12%	0.09%
Asian alone (NH)	8	24	0	75	84	103	0.05%	0.16%	0.00%	0.59%	0.67%	0.88%
Native Hawaiian or Pacific Islander alone (NH)	x	0	0	2	8	0	x	0.00%	0.00%	0.02%	0.06%	0.00%
Other race alone (NH)	25	45	9	7	22	32	0.16%	0.30%	0.07%	0.06%	0.18%	0.27%
Mixed race or Multiracial (NH)	x	x	x	162	191	258	x	x	x	1.28%	1.53%	2.21%
Hispanic or Latino (any race)	x	217	181	396	837	2,014	x	1.43%	1.38%	3.14%	6.69%	17.57%
Total	15,987	15,172	13,136	12,620	12,508	11,661	100.00%	100.00%	100.00%	100.00%	100.00%	100.00%

=== 2020 census ===
As of the 2020 census, Markham had a population of 11,661. There were 3,835 households and 2,821 families residing in the city. The median age was 36.6 years; 27.1% of residents were under the age of 18 and 16.1% were 65 years of age or older. For every 100 females, there were 87.8 males, and for every 100 females age 18 and over, there were 82.4 males.

100.0% of residents lived in urban areas, while 0.0% lived in rural areas.

The population density was 2,157.45 inhabitants per square mile (833.00/km^{2}). There were 4,283 housing units at an average density of 792.41 per square mile (305.95/km^{2}), of which 10.5% were vacant. The homeowner vacancy rate was 2.3% and the rental vacancy rate was 8.8%.

Of the 3,835 households, 39.2% had children under the age of 18 living in them. Of all households, 31.0% were married-couple households, 18.7% were households with a male householder and no spouse or partner present, and 44.0% were households with a female householder and no spouse or partner present. About 23.3% of all households were made up of individuals, and 10.3% had someone living alone who was 65 years of age or older.

== Government ==
In 2017, Roger Agpawa was elected mayor. He had previously served as fire chief in neighboring Country Club Hills. Having been convicted in 1999 of felony mail fraud in a federal health insurance case, he is one of the first convicted felons to have been elected mayor. Experts state that he would have been ineligible to serve in the highest office in that city, despite being sworn in as mayor in October 2018 after an 18-month legal battle.

Mayors of Markham, Illinois

Image	Mayor	Years	Notes
	William Sparger	1973–1985	
	Evans R Miller	1985–2001	First African-American mayor.
	David Webb Jr.	2001–2017	Second African American mayor. Sentenced to 2 years in prison for or $300,000 bribery scheme in 2021.
	Ernest Blevins	2017–2018	Acting mayor
	Roger Agpawa	2018–Present	

=== Federal representation ===
Markham is divided between two congressional districts. Most of the city is in Illinois's 2nd congressional district, consisting of the area south of the Dan Ryan Expressway (I-57) that is bordered on the west by Homan Avenue from 155th to 161st streets, Trumbull Avenue from 161st to 163rd, and Lawndale Avenue from 163rd to 167th; the rest of the city is part of the 1st district.

- 1st Congressional District-Congressman Jonathan Jackson-Democrat
- 2nd Congressional District-Congressman Robin Kelly-Democrat

=== State representation ===
In the Illinois State Senate Markham is split by two districts:

- 15th District-Senator Napoleon B. Harris III-Democrat
- 19th District-Senator Michael Hastings-Democrat

In the Illinois House of Representatives Markham is split by two districts:

- 30th District-Representative William Davis-Democrat
- 38th District-Representative Debbie Meyers-Martin-Democrat

== Education ==
Most of Markham is within Prairie-Hills School District 144, which includes 6 elementary schools, and Prairie-Hills Junior High School. A portion of Markham is within the Posen-Robbins School District 143½, which includes 4 elementary schools, and Thomas J. Kellar Middle School. Another Portion is within Hazel Crest School District 152.5, which includes 2 elementary schools, and Robert Frost Middle School. The remaining portion is within Harvey School District 152, which includes 5 elementary schools, and Brooks Middle School.

Most of Markham is served by Bremen High School, with another portion attending Hillcrest High School, and the remaining section goes to Tinley Park High School in Bremen Community High School District 228 The rest of the city is served by Thornwood High School within Thornton Township High School District 205.

== Infrastructure ==
=== Police department ===
The Markam Police Department is responsible for public safety and law enforcement.

Anthony "Tony" DeBois, the deputy police chief from 2008 to 2012 and described as an "ally of Markham Mayor David Webb Jr." by the Chicago Tribune, had been the subject to numerous lawsuits alleging brutality and misconduct from 2004 to 2011. In 2014 he was sentenced to 5 years in federal prison for raping a woman under arrest in 2010 and lying about it to the FBI in 2012.

=== Transportation ===
Pace provides bus service on multiple routes connecting Markham to destinations across the Southland.

== Notable people ==
- Randy Daniels, raised in Markham, secretary of state in New York, deputy mayor of New York City
- Floyd Fields, raised in Markham, retired safety for San Diego Chargers
- Cliff Floyd, raised in Markham, outfielder for San Diego Padres, Montreal Expos, Florida Marlins, and Chicago Cubs; pre- and post-game analyst for Marquee Sports Network
- Rodney Harrison, native of Markham, retired safety for New England Patriots and San Diego Chargers; NFL analyst for NBC
- Curtis Mayfield, solo artist and member of soul group the Impressions, once lived in Markham
- Denny McLain, raised in Markham, Major League Baseball player and Cy Young Award-winning pitcher
- Corey McPherrin, raised in Markham, news anchor and former sportscaster for WFLD-TV.
- Kid Sister, hip-hop artist, raised in Markham, "First Lady of Markham"
- Christopher "Tricky" Stewart, hip-hop artist and producer, born in Markham
