= Bremen Township, Illinois =

Bremen Township
- Township
- Seal

- Location in Cook County

- Cook County's location in Illinois
- Coordinates: 41°36′15″N 87°44′02″W
- Country: United States
- State: Illinois
- County: Cook

Area
  - Total: 37.8 sq mi (98.0 km^{2})
  - Land: 37.7 sq mi (97.7 km^{2})
  - Water: 0.12 sq mi (0.3 km^{2}) 0.30%
- Elevation: 640 ft (195 m)

Population (2020)
  - Total: 107,149
  - Density: 2,840/sq mi (1,100/km^{2})
- Time zone: UTC-6 (CST)
  - Summer (DST): UTC-5 (CDT)
- ZIP codes: 60406, 60426, 60428, 60429, 60430, 60445, 60452, 60462, 60463, 60469, 60472, 60477, 60478
- FIPS code: 17-031-07939
- Website: brementownship.org

Bremen Township is one of 29 townships in Cook County, Illinois, USA. As of the 2020 census, its population was 107,149 and it contained 42,611 housing units. It was organized in 1850 and is located southwest of Chicago in southern Cook County. An administrative office for Bremen Township is located at 16361 South Kedzie Parkway, Markham, Illinois. It is named after the State of the same name in Germany as this area was settled by primarily German settlers.

== Geography ==
According to the United States Census Bureau, Bremen Township covers an area of 37.8 square miles (98.0 km^{2}); of this, 37.7 square miles (97.7 km^{2}) is land and 0.12 square miles (0.3 km^{2}), or 0.30 percent, is water.

Bremen Township is bordered by Harlem Avenue (Illinois Route 43) on the west, 135th Street on the north, Western Avenue on the east and 183rd Street on the south.

=== Cities, towns and villages ===
- Blue Island (the remaining portion lies in Worth Township)
- Country Club Hills (the remaining portion lies in Rich Township)
- Crestwood (the remaining portion lies in Worth Township)
- Harvey (the extreme western edge of Harvey, the remaining 99% lies in Thornton Township)
- Hazel Crest (the remaining portion lies in both Thornton Township and Rich Township)
- Homewood (the remaining portion lies in both Thornton Township and Rich Township)
- Markham (the remaining portion lies in Thornton Township)
- Midlothian
- Oak Forest
- Orland Park (the extreme eastern edge of Orland Park, the remaining 99% lies in mostly Orland Township with small portions in Palos Township and Frankfort Township)
- Posen (the remaining portion lies in Thornton Township)
- Robbins (the remaining portion lies in Worth Township)
- Tinley Park (which also has a large portion in Orland Township with smaller sections in Rich Township and Frankfort Township, Will County)

=== Unincorporated towns ===
- Goeselville at 41.624199°N 87.785049°W

=== Adjacent townships ===
- Worth Township (north)
- Calumet Township (northeast)
- Thornton Township (east)
- Bloom Township (southeast)
- Rich Township (south)
- Frankfort Township, Will County (southwest)
- Orland Township (west)
- Palos Township (northwest)

=== Cemeteries ===
The township contains six cemeteries: Bachelor's Grove, County, Lewis Memorial Park, Saint Gabriel Catholic, Trinity Evangelical Lutheran and Zion Lutheran.

=== Major highways ===
- Interstate 57
- Interstate 80
- Interstate 294
- U.S. Route 6
- Illinois Route 43
- Illinois Route 50

=== Lakes ===
- Dolphin Lake
- Lake Dave
- Twin Lakes

== Demographics ==
Bremen Township, Illinois – Racial and ethnic composition Note: the US Census treats Hispanic/Latino as an ethnic category. This table excludes Latinos from the racial categories and assigns them to a separate category. Hispanics/Latinos may be of any race.
Race / Ethnicity (NH = Non-Hispanic)	Pop 2000	Pop 2010	Pop 2020	% 2000	% 2010	% 2020
White alone (NH)	67,674	56,728	47,087	61.76%	51.52%	43.95%
Black or African American alone (NH)	32,051	34,910	34,537	29.25%	31.70%	32.23%
Native American or Alaska Native alone (NH)	115	151	133	0.11%	0.14%	0.12%
Asian alone (NH)	1,590	2,052	2,435	1.45%	1.86%	2.27%
Native Hawaiian or Pacific Islander alone (NH)	13	26	9	0.01%	0.02%	0.01%
Other race alone (NH)	99	122	374	0.09%	0.11%	0.35%
Mixed race or Multiracial (NH)	1,248	1,383	2,889	1.14%	1.26%	2.70%
Hispanic or Latino (any race)	6,785	14,746	19,685	6.19%	13.39%	18.37%
Total	109,575	110,118	107,149	100.00%	100.00%	100.00%

Historical population
Census	Pop.	Note	%±
2000	109,575		—
2010	110,118		0.5%
2020	107,149		−2.7%
U.S. Decennial Census

As of the 2020 census there were 107,149 people, 40,406 households, and 26,490 families residing in the township. The population density was 2,830.29 inhabitants per square mile (1,092.78/km^{2}). There were 42,611 housing units at an average density of 1,125.55 units per square mile (434.58 units/km^{2}). The racial makeup of the township was 47.08% White, 32.61% African American, 0.62% Native American, 2.31% Asian, 0.02% Pacific Islander, 9.09% from other races, and 8.28% from two or more races. Hispanic or Latino of any race were 18.37% of the population.

There were 40,406 households, out of which 30.10% had children under the age of 18 living with them, 43.45% were married couples living together, 15.57% had a female householder with no spouse present, and 34.44% were non-families. 30.50% of all households were made up of individuals, and 12.80% had someone living alone who was 65 years of age or older. The average household size was 2.65 and the average family size was 3.34.

The township's age distribution consisted of 23.3% under the age of 18, 8.7% from 18 to 24, 25.6% from 25 to 44, 26.8% from 45 to 64, and 15.7% who were 65 years of age or older. The median age was 38.7 years. For every 100 females, there were 95.6 males. For every 100 females age 18 and over, there were 91.3 males.

The median income for a household in the township was $62,191, and the median income for a family was $75,850. Males had a median income of $42,482 versus $34,843 for females. The per capita income for the township was $29,114. About 8.9% of families and 11.2% of the population were below the poverty line, including 14.5% of those under age 18 and 10.9% of those age 65 or over.

== Education ==
The public high school district for most of Bremen Township is Bremen Community High School District 228 which includes Oak Forest High School, Bremen High School, Tinley Park High School, and Hillcrest High School.
