= Roger Agpawa =

American mayor (born 1961)

Roger A. Agpawa

Mayor of the City of Markham, Illinois
- Incumbent
- Assumed office September 25, 2018
- Preceded by: David Webb Jr. Ernest Blevins (acting)

Personal details
- Born: 1962 or 1963 (age 62–63)

Roger A. Agpawa (born 1961) is an American politician who serves as Mayor of Markham, Illinois, a small suburb of Chicago. He had previously served as fire chief.

== Biography ==
Agpawa has lived in Markham since the 1960s. He worked as the fire chief in neighboring Country Club Hills, Illinois before being hired as the first Black fire chief in Markham.

In April 2018, he won election as mayor succeeding Ernest Blevins (1931–2019) who had been appointed to serve as acting mayor by the City Council after the removal of mayor David Webb Jr. who was facing indictment on bribery charges. Having been convicted in 1999 of a felony mail fraud in a federal health insurance case, he is one of the first convicted felons to have been elected mayor. Because civil rights such as voting and holding public office are denied to convicted felons in many US states, experts stated that he would be ineligible to serve in the highest office in that city. He accepted responsibility for a crime 20 years earlier, completed his sentence, and has become a model citizen. The remedy that allowed Agpawa to take office was a “Restoration of Rights of Citizenship” signed on Sept 14, 2018, by the State of Illinois Governor Bruce Rauner. Agpawa was sworn into office on September 25, 2018.

On September 28, 2018, a Cook County judge vacated his earlier order that had prevented Agpawa from serving as mayor. A representative for the Cook County state's attorney's office said Agpawa found a “legally sufficient” way to hold office. Nothing like this has ever happened before, and the swearing-in ceremony was held.

In addition to serving residents of Markham, Agpawa is prominent among south suburban municipal officials. He's well known to legislators, politicians and business leaders through his role as fire chief.

In April 2021, he was re-elected to a 2nd term.

On August 26, 2021, the Supreme Court of Illinois published an opinion that the appellate court erred in holding that Roger Agpawa was not a qualified candidate for mayor of the City of Markham due to a 1999 federal felony mail fraud conviction, even though he obtained a document purporting to restore his citizenship rights from then-Governor Bruce Rauner, a Republican, in 2018.
