= Killing of Jemel Roberson =

Police killing in Robbins, Illinois, United States

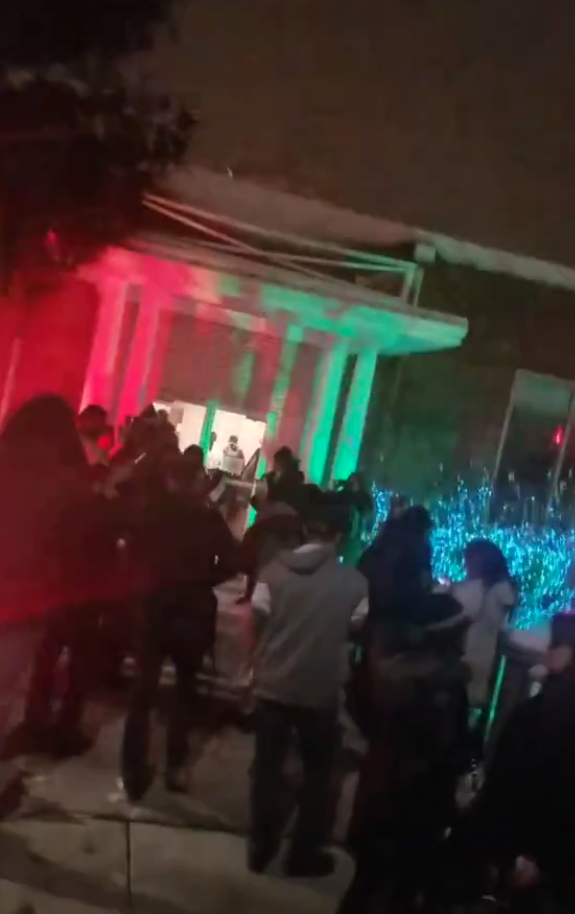
- Protestors outside of the Midlothian Village Hall shortly after protesting inside the Village Hall
- Date: November 11, 2018; 8 years ago
- Time: 4:00 a.m. (CDT)
- Location: Manny's Blue Room Bar, Robbins, Illinois, US
- Cause: Multiple gunshot wounds
- Participants: Jemel Roberson (deceased) Midlothian Police Officer Ian Covey
- Deaths: Jemel Roberson
- Injuries: Four unidentified individuals (includes original gunman)
- Inquiries: Illinois State Police
- Coroner: Cook County Medical Examiner
- Litigation: Federal lawsuit against the Midlothian Police Officer, and the Village of Midlothian which alleges excessive force during an unprovoked, unjustified, and unreasonable shooting

On November 11, 2018, Jemel Roberson, a 26-year-old security guard for Manny's Blue Room Bar in Robbins, Illinois, was fatally shot by Ian Covey, a Midlothian police officer responding to a call of shots fired at the bar. Roberson, an African American, was working for the bar as a security guard when four people were shot by a gunman. After Roberson subdued and pinned the shooter to the ground, he was shot by a Midlothian police officer arriving at the scene.

Covey was placed on paid administrative leave while the shooting was investigated. Witnesses stated that Roberson was wearing a vest that had the word "SECURITY" printed on it, while an Illinois State Police (ISP) preliminary investigation stated he was wearing plain black clothing with no markings identifying him as security. The ISP report stated the Midlothian officer gave Roberson "multiple verbal commands" to drop his gun and get on the ground, while witnesses said the officer shot Roberson "not even five seconds" after ordering Roberson to drop the gun he had in his hand. The State's Attorney's Office decided to not file criminal charges against the police officer.

== Jemel Roberson ==
Jemel Roberson was a security guard at the Manny's Blue Room bar in Robbins, Illinois, a suburb of Chicago. At the time of his death, Roberson had a 9-month-old son. Roberson himself was an aspiring police officer. He was a 2010 graduate from the Lane Tech High School in the Chicago area, where he had played on the school's basketball team. Apart from working as a security guard, Roberson was also an organist for several local churches, and was supposed to play at the New Spiritual Light Baptist Church later on the day of the shooting. According to the Cook County Sheriff's Office, Roberson was licensed to carry a gun.

== Shooting ==
Around 4 a.m., multiple law-enforcement agencies, including the Midlothian police, responded to 9-1-1 calls of a shooting at Manny's Blue Room Bar in Robbins, Illinois. Prior to police arrival, a security guard had requested a group of drunk men to leave the bar and an armed suspect had returned and opened fire. In response, armed security guards returned fire, and Roberson apprehended the suspect outside the bar. Eyewitnesses claimed that Roberson had the suspect pinned to the ground with his knee when Midlothian police officer Ian Covey arrived and fatally shot Roberson, after multiple bystanders had shouted warnings that Roberson was a security guard.

An eyewitness told reporters that after the shooting, another officer had turned to the officer involved and said, "Man you didn't have to do that, you didn't have to do that. We know these guys. We told you they're security."

A statement by the Midlothian police chief said, "Upon arrival, Officers learned there were several gunshot victims inside the bar. A Midlothian Officer encountered a subject with a gun and was involved in an officer involved shooting. The subject the officer shot was later pronounced dead at an area hospital."

== Investigation and legal proceedings ==
The Illinois State Police handled the investigation into the fatal shooting of Roberson by Ian Covey. Covey was placed on a paid administrative leave in the meantime. Covey had been with the Midlothian police department for almost seven years, assigned to the patrol division, and is also a SWAT team leader.

The police department initially argued that Roberson had ignored "verbal commands" before the shooting, but later released a second statement claiming that the shooting had been a case of "friendly fire," and that Roberson's death was a tragic accident. After previously identifying Roberson as an "armed subject" in reports, Midlothian Police Chief Daniel Delaney issued a November statement calling Roberson "a brave man who was doing his best to end an active shooter situation."

On November 12, 2018, an autopsy showed that Roberson had been shot multiple times, and the death was ruled a homicide. The same day, Roberson's mother filed a federal civil rights lawsuit against the Village of Midlothian and Ian Covey.

The Cook County State's Attorney's Office announced two years after the incident that no criminal charges would be filed against Covey.

The Roberson family hired national civil rights attorneys John Coyle of the McEldrew Purtell firm in Philadelphia and Lee Merritt of the Merritt Law Firm in Dallas to represent the family. The City of Midlothian reached a 7.5 million dollar settlement with Roberson's family in July 2022.

== Protests ==
Shortly after the death of Roberson, multiple protests ensued in Midlothian, but most were centered around the Midlothian Police Department and Village Hall. In 2020, Midlothian residents again protested the shooting of Roberson in light of the wider George Floyd protests.
