= Grande Prairie Public Library =

Library in Cook County, Illinois, US

- 41°33′23.51″N 87°42′3.06″W
- Location: 3479 W 183rd St, Hazel Crest, Illinois, USA
- Type: Public library
- Established: 1930
- Service area: Country Club Hills, Hazel Crest

Collection
- Size: 68,601

Access and use
- Circulation: 24,829
- Population served: 30,641

Other information
- Website: www.grandeprairie.org

The Grande Prairie Public Library serves the communities of Hazel Crest, Illinois, and Country Club Hills, Illinois. It is located at 3479 W. 183rd Street in Hazel Crest, in the south suburbs of Chicago. The library is a member of the Metropolitan Library System.

== Early history of the Hazel Crest Library ==
The original Hazel Crest Library was established in 1930 by the Professional Women's Club and housed in a room in the Roosevelt School. The library was staffed by volunteers. When the school was renovated and renamed the Warren Palm School in 1931, the library moved into a portable building on the school grounds. When the Warren Palm School continued its expansion in 1951, the library lost its space and discontinued service. The remaining books were donated to the school.

== Early history of the Country Club Hills Library ==
The original Country Club Hills Public Library, established in 1960, consisted of donated books and was located in one room of the old city hall building. In 1964, the library moved into the newly built Civic Center and expanded its space in 1966. The first full-time professional librarian was hired in 1973.

== History of the Grande Prairie Public Library ==
In September 1974, the city of Country Club Hills passed a referendum to establish the Country Club Hills Library District. The following year, the city of Hazel Crest was annexed to the district. In 1978, the library moved into a 3,000-square-foot (280 m^{2}) temporary space in the Stonebridge Shopping Center in Hazel Crest.

In May 1977, the name of the library district was changed to Grande Prairie Public Library District to better reflect the heritage of both communities.

In September 1979, residents of Hazel Crest and Country Club Hills approved a $1.1 million bond for the construction of a new 16,700-square-foot (1,550 m^{2}) library building. The building at 3479 W. 183rd Street, designed by the architectural firm Holabird & Root (originally Holabird & Roche), opened to the public on April 12, 1982.

== Floor plan of the library ==
The two-story building houses adult materials upstairs, including fiction and non-fiction, periodicals, DVDs, VHS cassettes, CDs, and Audiobooks on CD and cassette. Also located upstairs are ten, public-access internet computers (managed by reservation), three online catalogs, and black/white printing and copying capabilities. Downstairs, the library houses youth materials, including a variety similar to the adult materials. The youth department hosts five filtered internet computers and three online catalogs. Also located downstairs are the library's large meeting and small conference rooms, along with a color copier and an additional black/white copier.

Family restrooms are located on each floor. An elevator is available to serve patrons and staff.
