= Bremen Community High School District 228 =

School district in Illinois, United States

Coordinates: 41.598761°N 87.732475°W

Location
- 15233 Pulaski Road Midlothian, Illinois

District information
- Type: public secondary district
- Established: 1953
- Superintendent: Dr. Brad Sikora

Other information
- Website: www.bhsd228.com

Bremen High School District 228 is a public four year high school district covering about 29 square miles (75 km^{2}) in Bremen Township. It serves the communities of Midlothian, Posen, Tinley Park, Markham, Hazel Crest, Country Club Hills, and Oak Forest in southern Cook County, Illinois in the south suburbs of Chicago. The district serves over 5,000 students and employs roughly 800 full and part-time staff members. The four high schools this district operates are Bremen, Tinley Park, Hillcrest, and Oak Forest. The community college that serves District 228 is South Suburban College in South Holland, Illinois with a satellite campus in Oak Forest.

== History ==
Bremen High School District 228 was founded in 1953 to serve the area which had previously been assigned to Thornton Township public high schools. The first District 228 school to open was Bremen High School in Midlothian, Illinois, 1953.

Further population increases in the 1950s and 1960s resulted in the opening of three additional schools:

- Tinley Park High School in Tinley Park, Illinois, 1961
- Hillcrest High School in Country Club Hills, Illinois, 1967 (a portmanteau of two communities which it represents: Country Club Hills and Hazel Crest)
- Oak Forest High School in Oak Forest, Illinois, 1970
