= Bachelor's Grove Cemetery =

Cemetery in Cook County, Illinois, US

Coordinates: 41°37′51″N 87°46′15″W

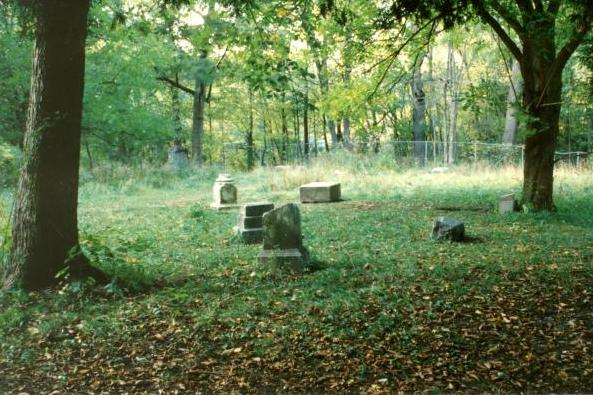
- Bachelor's Grove Cemetery
- Interactive map of Bachelor's Grove Cemetery

Details
- Location: Bremen Township, Cook County, Illinois

Bachelor's Grove Cemetery is a cemetery in Bremen Township, Cook County, Illinois, in Chicago's southwest suburbs. The cemetery has also been called Bachelor Grove, Batchelor Grove, Batchelder's Grove, and Everden (or Everdon). This cemetery is the setting for a number of ghostlore stories.

== Location ==
Bachelor's Grove Cemetery is just northwest of Midlothian and Oak Forest in the southwest Chicago suburbs. The cemetery is a roughly trapezoid-shaped area enclosed by the Rubio Woods forest preserve. One side is bordered by the remains of the Midlothian Turnpike, an early toll road that leads from Blue Island to points southwest.

== History ==
The land surrounding Bachelors Grove Cemetery was originally settled by English homesteaders who relocated to the area from New England, including Stephen Rexford, arguably the most well known of the first wave of Anglo settlers, around 1833. According to legal records, Edward M. Everden sold the property to Frederick Schmidt in 1864, "reserving and setting aside one acre of the land for use as a graveyard".

Historians are unsure of the origin of the name Bachelor's Grove. A family named Batchelder were known to be living in the area by 1845 which is one possibility. The other comes from claims by Rexford that he and three other single men settled the area, thus the name Bachelor. Variations of the name of the Grove include Bachelor, Batchelder, Bachelder, Berzel, Petzel, Bachlor, Bachellor, and Batchel. It is now strongly suspected that the original derivation of the name was from the family "Batchelder" who resided in the area at least as early as 1845. The first post office in the area was established in 1843 and named Bachelor's Grove.

According to a 1917 manuscript, the first burial was that of Eliza Scott in November 1844. Accounts published in the local newspaper Blue Island Sun-Standard list William B. Nobles as being buried in Bachelor's Grove in 1838. The last burial listed is of Robert Shields, who was buried in his family plot in 1989.

Some families have had bodies of relatives moved to other cemeteries, with relocations dating to the late 1880s. The cemetery is supervised by the Cemetery Trustees of the Cook County Board, who are entrusted to take charge of the care and maintenance of the property.

== Vandalism ==
During the 1970s, the cemetery gained fame among ghost hunters and legend trippers for claims that it was haunted. Due to its secluded location, young partygoers frequented the site, leading to significant vandalism of the grave sites. Consequently, few original markers remain from more than 200 burials dating from 1840 until the early 1960s. According to Brad Bettenhausen, president emeritus of the Tinley Park Historical Society, "Kids start going there to drink and to party. They leave their trash behind, and you get the scary stories told around a little campfire or what have you. This is where the legends start". Bettenhausen wrote that claims of floating lights, phantom cars, ghostly apparitions and other stories about the cemetery have been "told and retold by several generations of youths, however, few of these tales have any apparent basis in fact".

== Gallery ==
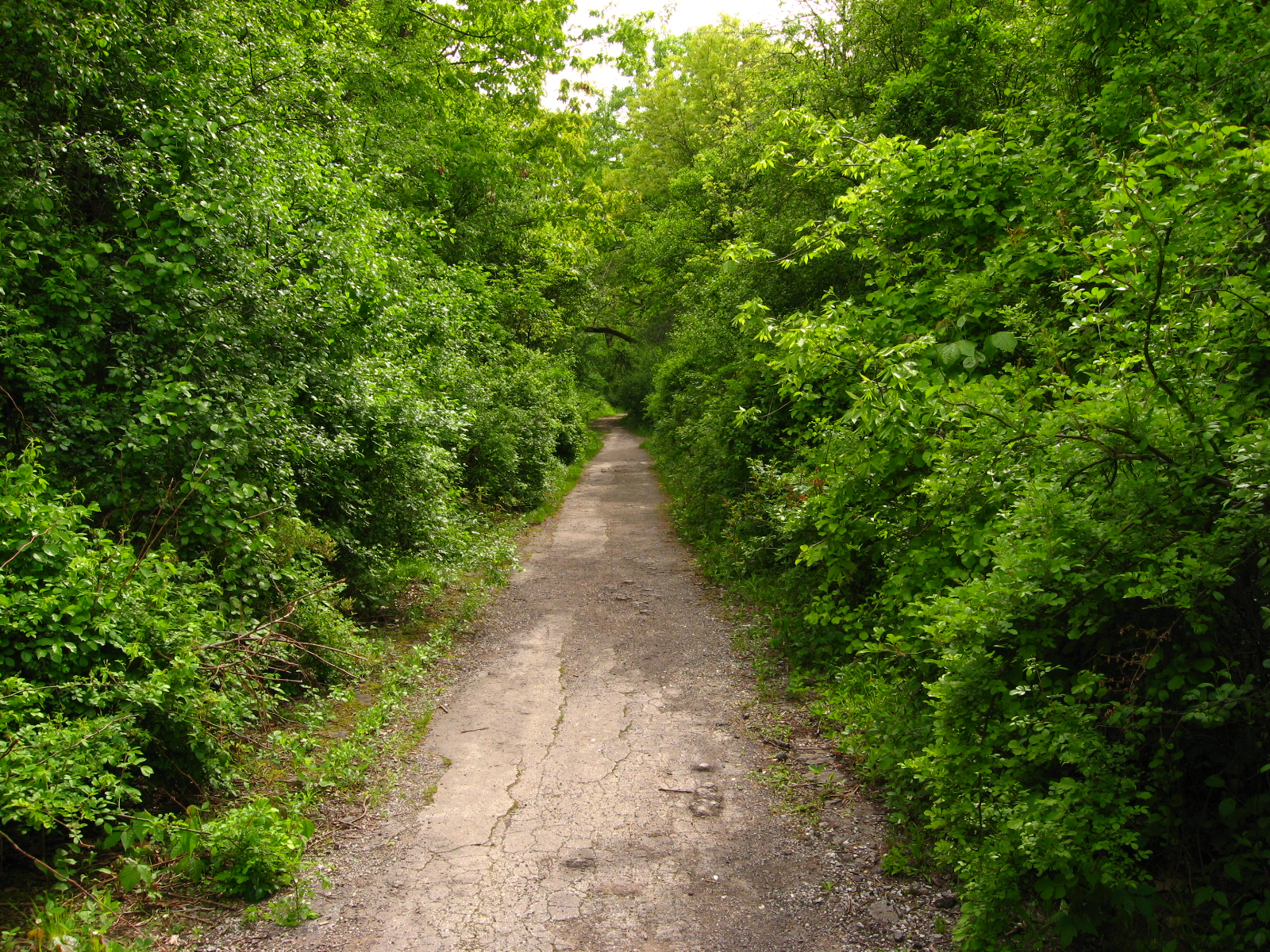
Pathway entrance

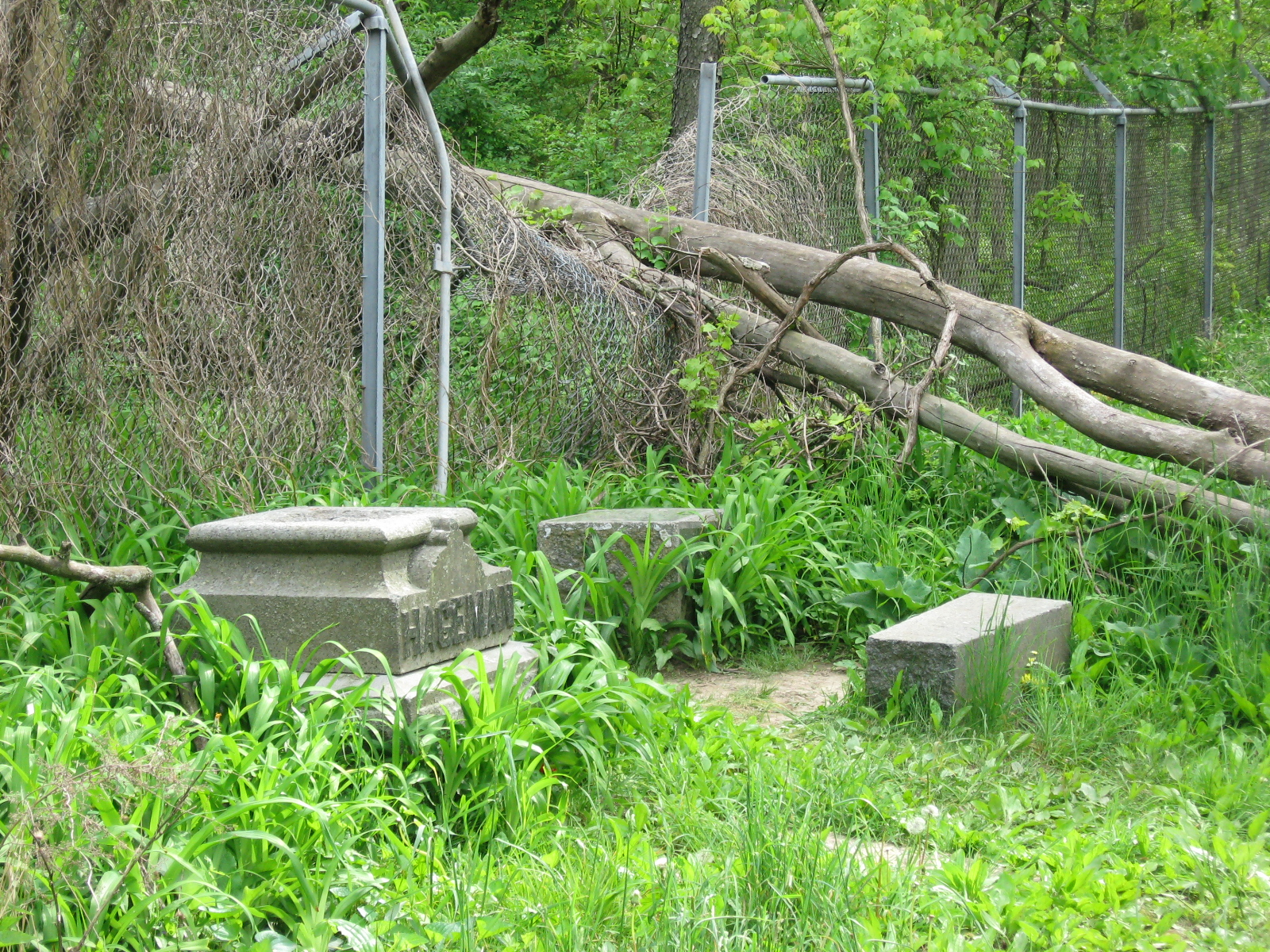
Fallen tree

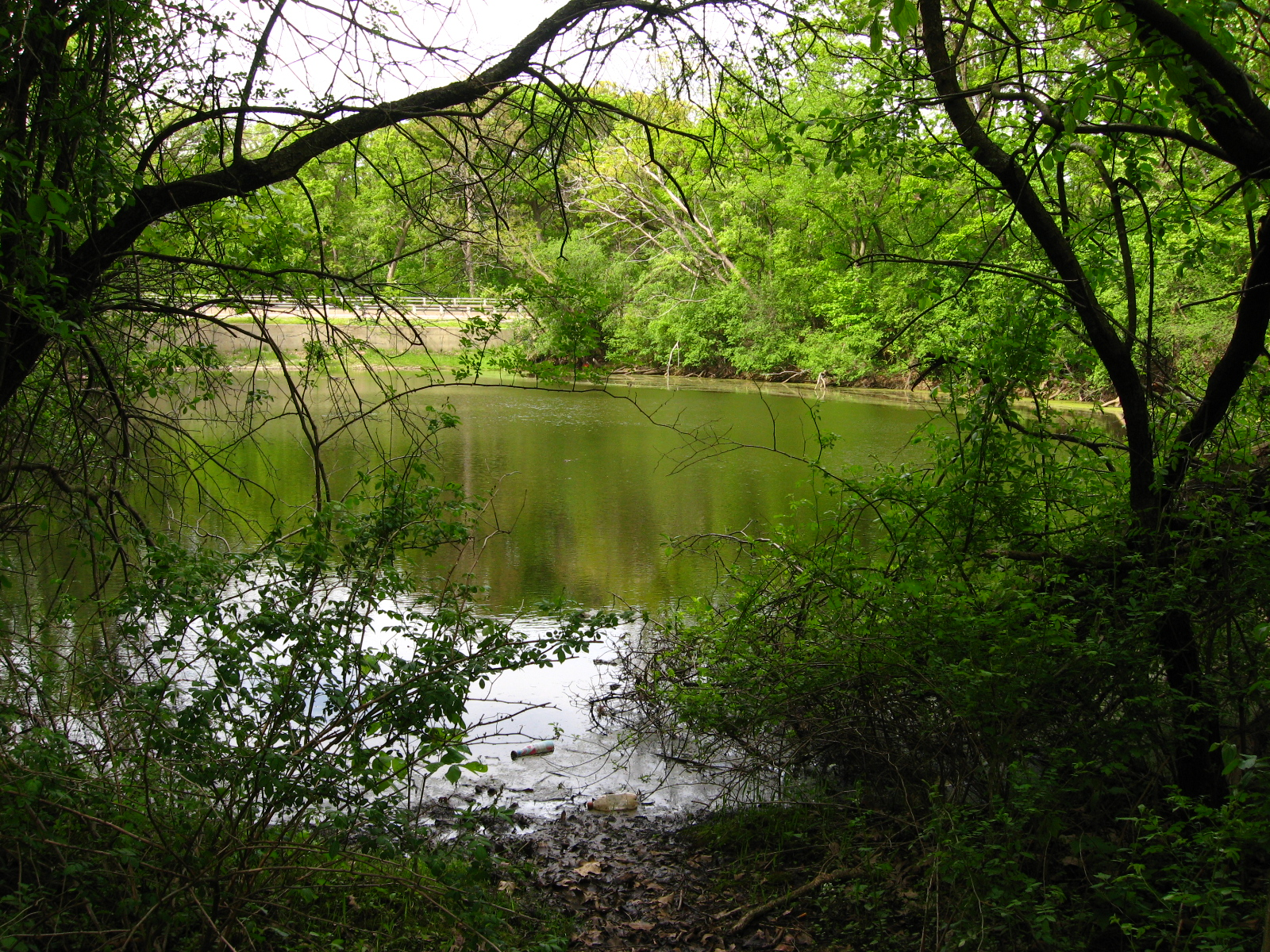
Cemetery pond

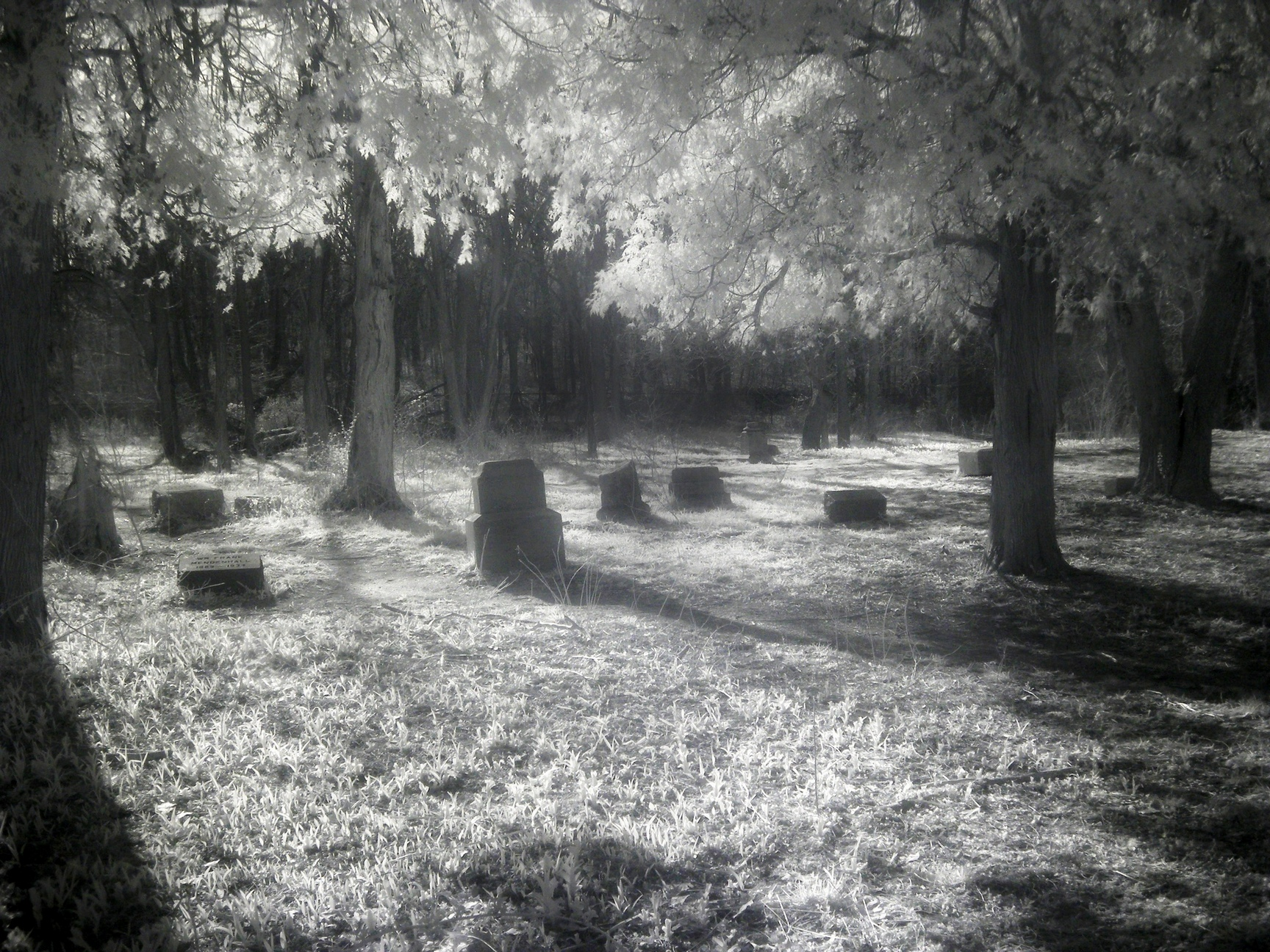
Bachelor's Grove in infrared (IR)

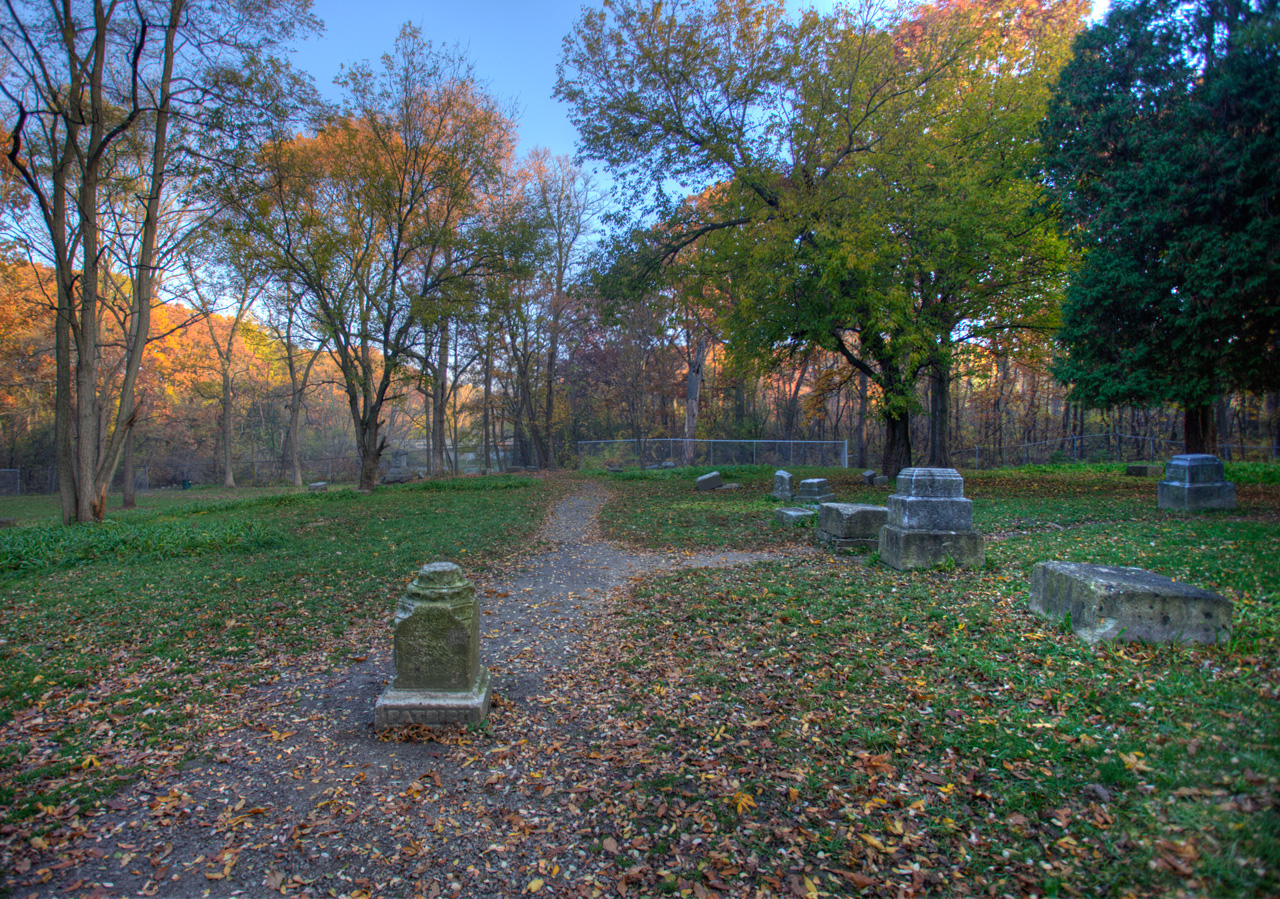
Bachelor's Grove Cemetery

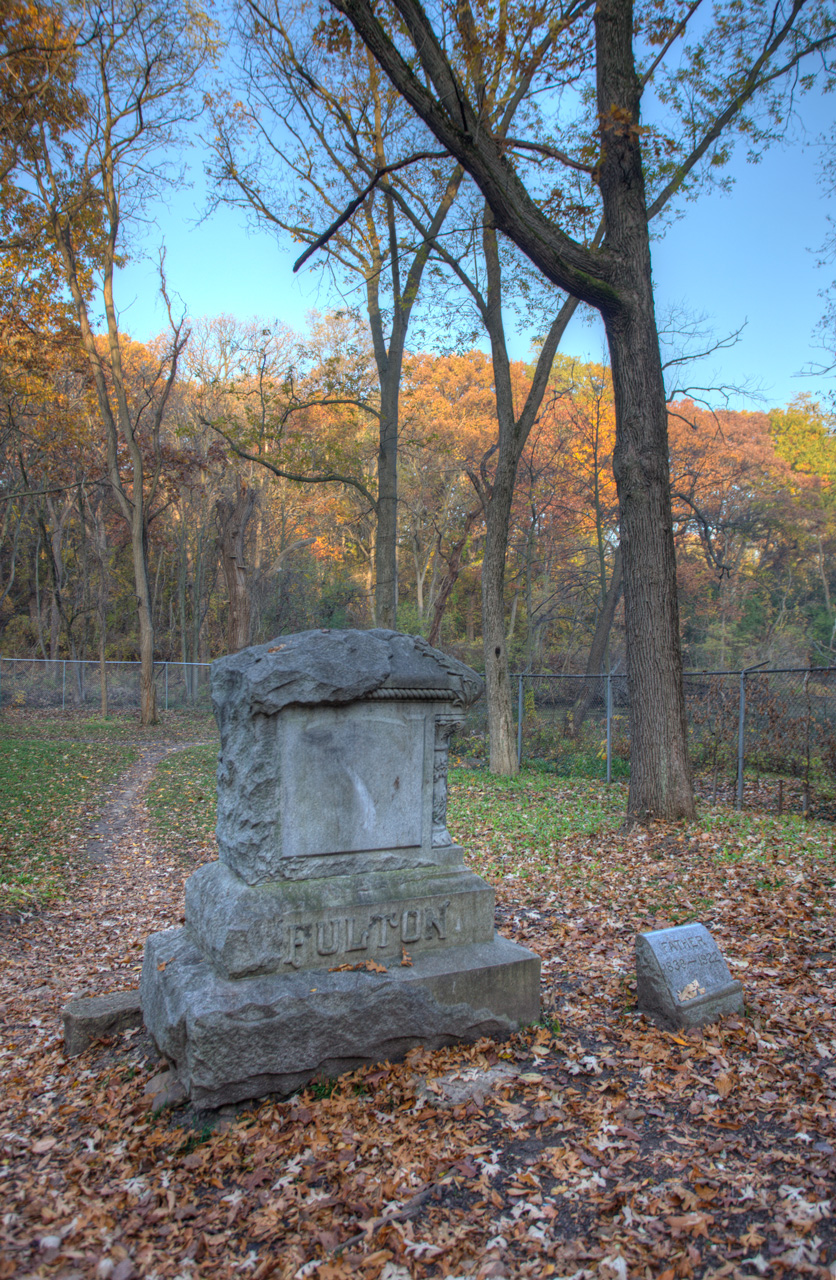
Bachelor's Grove Cemetery

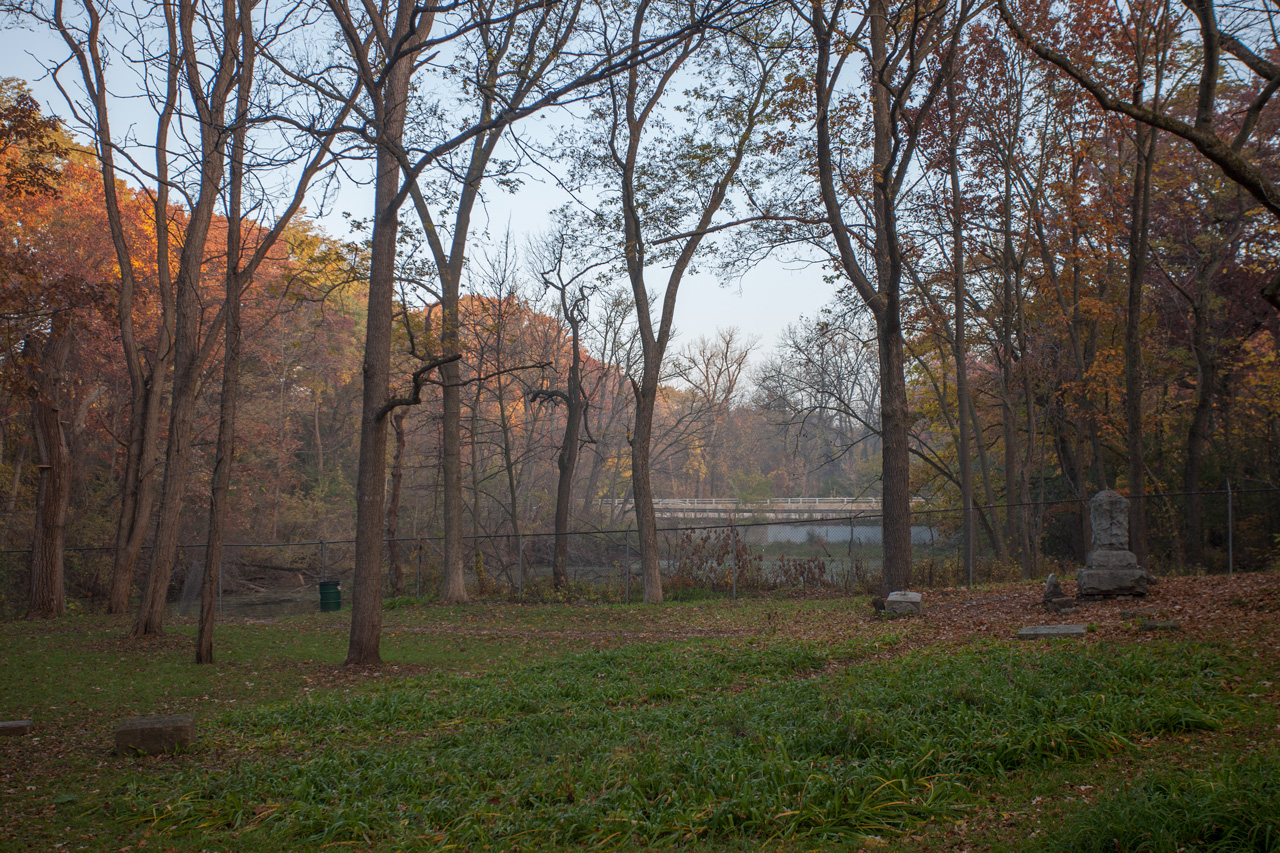
Bachelor's Grove Cemetery
