= Thirteendegrees =

American rapper

- Born: Jalen Hughes; Chicago, Illinois, U.S.
- Genres: Hip hop; trap
- Occupations: Rapper; singer; record producer; songwriter
- Years active: 2022–present
- Label: Island

Jalen Hughes, professionally known as Thirteendegrees (stylized as Thirteendegrees°), is an American rapper and record producer. Starting his career in 2023, he first gained significant attention after the release of his album Clique City Vol. 2.

== Early life and education ==
Jalen Hughes was born in Chicago and raised by his mother, grandmother, and aunt. He played basketball in the guard position at Hillcrest High School. He attended Moraine Valley Community College for two years before transferring to Our Lady of the Lake University in San Antonio where he played basketball in the NAIA division. He became depressed during the COVID-19 pandemic and quit basketball in 2021. He then moved back to Chicago and became interested in fashion and music.

== Career ==
Hughes began releasing music in 2022 and released his first two mixtapes, Urban Junkie and Metropolitan, in 2023. He released Uptown Dropout and Clique City Vol. 1 in 2024.

After releasing a slew of singles and tapes throughout the years, in January 2025, Hughes started gaining traction on social media with his breakout single "Da Problem Solva" off his fifth mixtape, Clique City, Vol 2, which would catch the attention of Rod Wave, who co-signed the rapper. Other underground acts such as midwxst, Summrs, and k3 would also co-sign the rapper, with the latter two hopping on the unreleased remixes of "Da Problem Solva." On Pitchfork's "100 best songs of the year" list, "Da Problem Solva" was at #77, while for The Fader's "50 best projects of 2025" list, Clique City, Vol 2 would be placed at #46.

To prevent fans from waiting on the release of his debut studio album, Hughes would release a mixtape titled Cyber Sundayz on July 20, 2025, consisting of leftover tracks dating back to 2023. On October 3, 2025, Hughes would release his seventh mixtape and debut commercial project Black Fridayz to critical acclaim. In July 2026, Hughes performed at Mike's Young World Festival. August 21, 2026, he would release his debut studio album, Ghetto Hipster, which has 16 tracks and a feature from Trippie Redd.

== Musical style ==
Hughes' music is often compared to that of the "swag era" and early 2010s hip-hop, blending R&B and trap, and including auto-tuned vocals, nostalgic visuals, and jerk-related sounds. He stated his influences were what he "grew up in—the trap era, the Tumblr era, early Instagram." He has cited Rich Kidz, Kanye West, Twista, and Santigold as influences on his music. He is considered to be at the forefront of the "New Chicago" movement, named as the successor to Chicago drill. Lyrically, Hughes often incorporates catchy choruses paired with hedonist lyricism within his tracks.

== Personal life ==
Hughes is interested in fashion, and creates clothing for himself.

== Discography ==
=== Studio albums ===
Title	Album details
Urban Junkie	Released: August 11, 2023; Label: Self-released; Format: Digital download, streaming
Metropolitan	Released: December 14, 2023; Label: Self-released; Format: Digital download, streaming
Uptown Dropout	Released: April 15, 2024; Label: Self-released; Format: Digital download, streaming
Clique City Vol. 1	Released: July 27, 2024; Label: Self-released (initial release); Island (re-release); Format: Digital download, streaming
Clique City Vol. 2	Released: January 13, 2025; Label: Self-released (initial release); Island (re-release); Format: Digital download, streaming
Black Fridayz	Released: October 3, 2025; Label: Island; Format: Digital download, streaming
Ghetto Hipster	Released: August 21, 2026; Label: Island; Format: Digital download, streaming

=== Singles ===
Title	Year	Album
"#Mirror"	2023	Non-album singles
"Go Gangsta"	2023	Non-album singles
"First Link"	2023	Non-album singles
"#Jacket"	2023	Non-album singles
"South Loop"	2023	Non-album singles
"Egokiller"	2023	Non-album singles
"Ms Gold Chainz"	2023	Non-album singles
"Chi-lanta"	2023	Metropolitan
"#Autopilot"	2023	Non-album singles
"How Da Game Go"	2023	Non-album singles
"#Cliquecity"	2024	Non-album singles
"I Get #Guap"	2024	Uptown Dropout
"Adrianna Anthem"	2024	Non-album singles
"Champ"	2024	Non-album singles
"Monsta"	2024	Non-album singles
"Giuseppe Heelz"	2024	Non-album singles
"Ms Avoidant"	2024	Non-album singles
"Tear Dropz"	2024	Non-album singles
"Da Problem Solva"	2025	Clique City Vol. 2
"Exotic Strippaz"	2025	Black Fridayz
"Palace"	2025	Black Fridayz
"Exotic Strippaz"	2025	Black Fridayz
"Champain"	2025	Black Fridayz
"Lyricz"	2026	Ghetto Hipster
"Dwntwn Luv"	2026	Ghetto Hipster
"Hipster Encore"	2026	Ghetto Hipster
