= Chicago Southland =

Suburban region of Chicago, Illinois

- Region
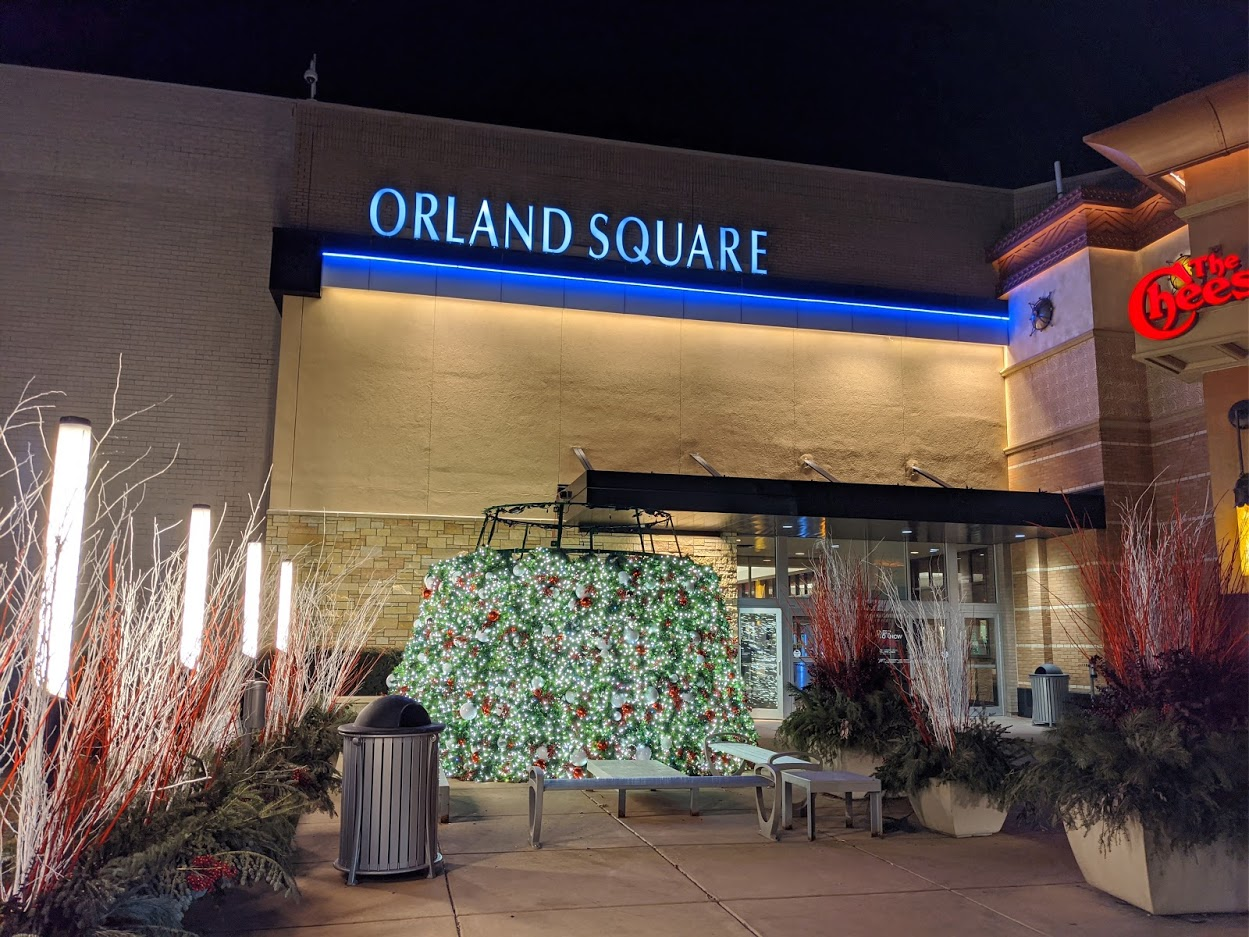
- Orland Square in Orland Park, Illinois
- Country: United States
- State: Illinois
- County: Cook
- City: Chicago
- Largest City: Orland Park

Population
  - Total: 2.5 million

The Chicago Southland is a region comprising the south and southwest suburbs of the City of Chicago in the U.S. state of Illinois. Home to roughly 2.5 million residents, this region has been known as the Southland by the local populace and regional media for over 20 years. Despite this relatively recent term, some older native Southlanders and current local advertisements colloquially refer to the Southland as the Southside, meaning on the southern side/border of Chicago as extended into the suburbs since some of them previously lived on Chicago's Southside but moved to the suburbs during post WWII white flight.

There is great racial and economic diversity in the Southland, with low and middle income areas to the north and higher income areas farther south and west.

The southland is home to much of the region's Black suburban population, with the overwhelming majority residing along Interstate 57, east to the Bishop Ford Expressway and the Indiana state border. The south suburbs are also home to the highest black homeownership rates in the country, with five of its communities ranked in the top ten in 2018.

The region is also home to a high Polish, Lithuanian, Palestinian, Irish, Dutch, German, and Mexican population.

== Municipalities ==
=== Cook County ===
- Alsip
- Bedford Park
- Blue Island
- Bridgeview
- Burbank
- Burnham
- Calumet City
- Calumet Park
- Chicago Heights
- Chicago Ridge
- Country Club Hills
- Crestwood
- Dixmoor
- Dolton
- East Hazel Crest
- Evergreen Park
- Flossmoor
- Ford Heights
- Forest View
- Glenwood
- Harvey
- Hazel Crest
- Hickory Hills
- Hometown
- Homewood
- Justice
- Lansing
- Lemont
- Lynwood
- Markham
- Matteson
- Merrionette Park
- Midlothian
- Oak Forest
- Oak Lawn
- Olympia Fields
- Orland Hills
- Orland Park (vast majority)
- Palos Heights
- Palos Hills
- Palos Park
- Park Forest (vast majority)
- Phoenix
- Posen
- Richton Park
- Riverdale
- Robbins
- Sauk Village (vast majority)
- South Chicago Heights
- South Holland
- Steger (partially)
- Summit
- Thornton
- Tinley Park (vast majority)
- Worth

=== Will County ===
- Beecher
- Crete
- Frankfort (vast majority)
- Homer Glen
- Mokena
- Monee
- New Lenox
- Peotone
- University Park (vast majority)

== Transportation ==
=== Air transit ===
The possibility of an airport in Peotone has been discussed since 1968, with official planning beginning in 1984. However, due to concerns that this would negatively impact the environment, the project has yet to be completed. As late as 2014, Illinois Governor Pat Quinn expressed intention to continue with the project, despite slowdown from the FAA.

=== Mass transit ===
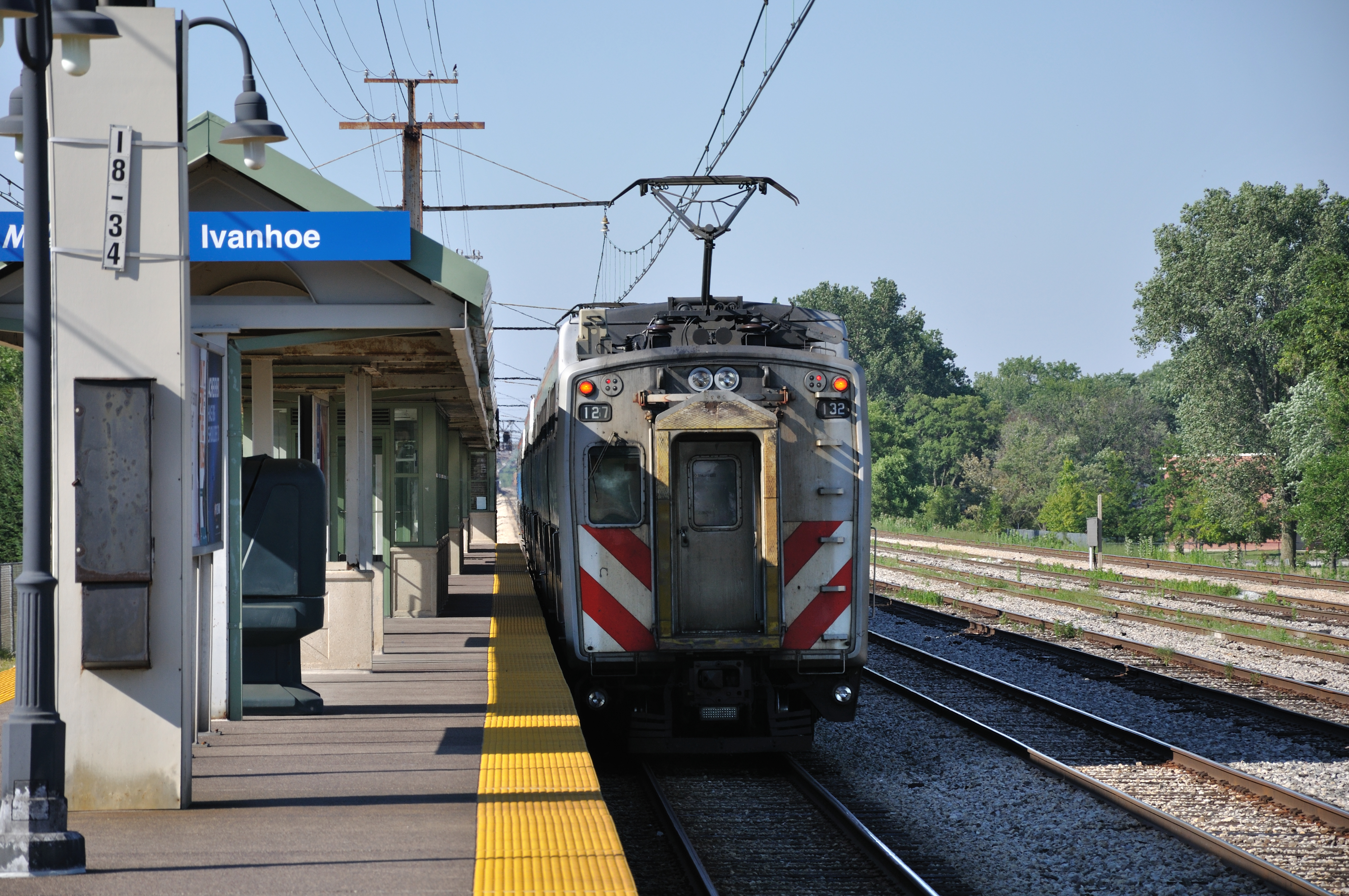
Metra Electric Train at Ivanhoe station in Riverdale, Illinois

- The Metra Electric District, Rock Island District and SouthWest Service Metra lines serve Chicago Southland commuters.
- Pace also operates several bus lines in the Chicago Southland, with operating divisions in Markham and a major facility in South Holland.

=== Interstate highways ===
- Interstate 55
- Interstate 57
- Interstate 80
- Interstate 94
- Interstate 294
- Interstate 355

== Crime ==
Generally, crime in the Southland tends to be slightly higher than the other suburban regions of Chicago. Most of the violent crime occurs in the south suburbs, such as Harvey, which in 2019, recorded 23 homicides, the most of any suburb in Cook County.

== Shopping centers/Malls ==
- Chicago Ridge Mall (Chicago Ridge, Illinois)
- Orland Park Place (Orland Park, Illinois)
- Orland Square Mall (Orland Park, Illinois)
- River Oaks Center (Calumet City, Illinois)

== Attractions ==
- SeatGeek Stadium (Bridgeview, Illinois)
- Hollywood Casino Amphitheatre (Tinley Park, Illinois)
- Thornton Quarry (Thornton, Illinois)
- Lincoln Oasis (South Holland, Illinois)

== Post-secondary education ==
There are a variety of community colleges and universities in the Chicago Southland including:

- Governors State University (University Park, Illinois)
- Moraine Valley Community College (Palos Hills, Illinois)
- Prairie State College (Chicago Heights, Illinois)
- South Suburban College (South Holland, Illinois)
- Trinity Christian College (Palos Heights, Illinois)
