= Hillcrest High School (Country Club Hills, Illinois) =

Public high school in Illinois, United States

Location
- 17401 S. Pulaski Road; Country Club Hills, Illinois 60478; United States; 41.5742°N 87.712°W

Information
- School type: Public Secondary
- Motto: Soaring with unity, pride, and excellence
- Opened: 1967
- School district: Bremen High School District 228
- Superintendent: Brad Sikora
- Principal: Ronald Towner
- Staff: 107
- Teaching staff: 75.10 (FTE)
- Grades: 9–12
- Gender: coed
- Enrollment: 1,100 (2024-25)
  - Grade 9: 234 students
  - Grade 10: 238 students
  - Grade 11: 302 students
  - Grade 12: 326 students
- Average class size: 23
- Student to teacher ratio: 14.65
- Area: South Suburbs
- Campus type: Suburban
- Colors: Columbia Blue; Navy Blue; White
- Athletics conference: South Suburban Conference
- Mascot: Henry the Hawk
- Team name: Hawks
- Publication: Flight
- Newspaper: Pinion
- Website: https://hillcrest.bhsd228.com

Hillcrest High School is a public four year high school located in Country Club Hills, Illinois. It is part of Bremen High School District 228 which also includes Tinley Park High School, Oak Forest High School, and Bremen High School. The name "Hillcrest" aside from the obvious connotation of being "the highest point of a hill", is a portmanteau of the two towns which the school primarily serves: Country Club Hills and Hazel Crest.

== History ==
The first principal of Hillcrest, William Henry Reeves, was appointed in May 1965, leaving his job as principal of Bremen High School to start the new school. Groundbreaking took place in November of that year, with a needed bond referendum passing in December 1966 to cover construction of an addition, even before the school was opened. The school opened in February 1967.

The early 1970s at Hillcrest saw a number of racially motivated incidents as the demographics of the school's attendance area began to shift. A late April 1970 incident, coupled with similar incidents in other local schools led to the spread of attacks beyond the school to the local community of Markham. In 1971, the school was temporarily closed after a racially motivated fight that resulted in 48 students being suspended. 1973 saw a 14 May riot that resulted in 34 suspensions and the recommendation for 20 expulsions. When the school board, under pressure from parents, decided to rescind some of the punishments without consulting the building staff or administration, the school's principal, Lee Cox, requested reassignment.

In 1990, the FBI investigated an incident involving several students from the school who claimed they had been harassed by a Forest Preserve officer while taking a day off from school illegally. Among those counseling parents at the time was R. Eugene Pincham.

In February 1994, the school cancelled planned parent-teacher conferences and a day off of school to accommodate a visit by President Bill Clinton. Students were banned from parking at the school that day to accommodate the president's helicopter, Marine One, landing in the parking lot. The visit coincided with the Brady Bill becoming law.

== Athletics ==
Hillcrest competes in the South Suburban Conference (SSC) and is a member of the Illinois High School Association (IHSA), which governs most sports and competitive activities in the state. Teams are stylized as the Hawks.

The school sponsors interscholastic sports teams for both men and women in basketball, bowling, cross country, golf, tennis, track & field, and wrestling. Men may also compete in baseball, football, and lacrosse while women may compete in cheerleading, softball, and volleyball.

The following teams won or placed top 4 in their respective IHSA sponsored state championship tournament/meet:

- Basketball (Boys): State Champions (2009–10);
- Track (Boys): State Champions (2008–09, 2009–10)

== Notable alumni ==
- Maurice Acker (2005), former college basketball player for the Marquette Golden Eagles.
- Maurice "Mobetta" Brown, jazz trumpeter, producer and composer. As a member of Tedeschi Trucks Band, he shared the 2011 Grammy for Best Blues Album (Revelator)
- Danny Clark, NFL linebacker, formerly playing for the New York Giants.
- Marquice Cole (2002), NFL cornerback, formerly playing for the New York Jets.
- Herb Coleman, former American football player
- Gary Dotson, convicted rapist whose conviction was overturned after his accuser recanted.
- Brady Dougan, CEO of Credit Suisse.
- Jalen Hughes, rapper known professionally as Thirteendegrees
- Bucky Irving (2021), NFL running back for the Tampa Bay Buccaneers
- Jerel McNeal (2005), former basketball player for the Marquette Golden Eagles.
- Corey McPherrin, television sports reporter.
