= Bremen High School (Midlothian, Illinois) =

Public high school in Illinois, United States

Coordinates: 41°36′55″N 87°42′58″W

- 15203 South Pulaski Road; Midlothian, Illinois 60445; United States

Information
- Type: Public Secondary
- Motto: We Have Pride
- Established: 1953
- Superintendent: Brad Sikora
- Principal: Jessica Rucinski
- Staff: 91.40 (FTE)
- Grades: 9-12
- Enrollment: 1,414 (2024-2025)
  - Grade 9: 304 students
  - Grade 10: 324 students
  - Grade 11: 376 students
  - Grade 12: 410 students
- Average class size: 23
- Student to teacher ratio: 15.47
- Campus: Suburban
- Colors: Red; Grey
- Athletics conference: South Suburban
- Mascot: Bremen Brave
- Newspaper: Echo
- Yearbook: Arrow
- Website: bremen.bhsd228.com

Bremen High School, BHS, or simply Bremen is a public four-year high school located in Midlothian, Illinois. It is the first school built as part of Bremen Community High School District 228 which also includes Tinley Park High School, Hillcrest High School and Oak Forest High School. Bremen High School was opened in 1953 along with the creation of Bremen High School District 228 to serve students in the newly developing areas at the time. Bremen High School is named after the township in which it is located, Bremen Township.

== History ==
Bremen High School was the first school to be built in district 228. The school mainly serves the communities of Midlothian, Posen, Markham and a small part of Harvey. William J. Stolz, class of 1956, was the first Bremen Graduate to be elected to the Board of Education and went to Washington D.C. as the youngest school board President in the Nation.

Prior to the opening of the school, students attended Thornton Township High School, Bloom Township High School, Blue Island High School, and Joliet Township High School. Bremen High School opened in September 1953, though it was not officially dedicated until November, with Senator Everett Dirksen presiding over the dedication. The staff consisted of 37 teachers and administrators and 732 students. Construction costs for the construction was $1,175,000.

== Athletics ==
Bremen competes in the South Suburban Conference and is a member of the Illinois High School Association (IHSA).

The school sponsors interscholastic teams for young men and women in baseball, basketball, cheerleading, cross country, football, golf, lacrosse, soccer, softball, swimming, tennis, track and field, volleyball, and wrestling. Bremen also hosts the district water polo team. While not sponsored by the IHSA, Bremen also sponsors a pom team.

The following teams won their respective IHSA sponsored state championship tournament/meet:

- Soccer (Boys): Regional Champions 2008-09 through 2011-12, 2013–14, 2015-16 through 2019-20; Sectional Champions 2008-09, 2017-18
- Poms: State Champions (2005-2006)

== Notable alumni ==
- Gary Bettenhausen, former auto racing driver
- Pete Lovrich, former MLB player (Kansas City Athletics)
- George H. Rieke, astronomer, elected to the National Academy of Sciences in 2011.
- Ken Wahl, former actor and TV star
