= Tinley Park High School =

Public high school in Illinois, United States

Location
- 6111 West 175th Street; Tinley Park, Illinois 60477; United States; 41°34′18″N 87°46′02″W

Information
- School type: Public Secondary
- Opened: 1961
- School district: Bremen Community High School District 228
- Superintendent: Dr. Brad Sikora
- CEEB code: 144118
- Principal: Dr. Theresa Nolan
- Teaching staff: 64.65 (FTE)
- Grades: 9–12
- Gender: Coed
- Enrollment: 1,042 (2024-2025)
  - Grade 9: 250 students
  - Grade 10: 239 students
  - Grade 11: 276 students
  - Grade 12: 277 students
- Average class size: 23.4
- Student to teacher ratio: 18.71
- Campus: Suburban
- Colors: Scarlet; Gold
- Athletics conference: South Suburban Conference
- Nickname: Titans
- Rival: Oak Forest High School
- Accreditation: Illinois State Board of Education
- Publication: Afterthoughts
- Newspaper: Titan Times
- Yearbook: Scythe
- Website: tinley.bhsd228.com

Tinley Park High School, TPHS or simply Tinley is a public high school located in Tinley Park, Illinois, approximately 30 miles southwest of Chicago. It is part of Bremen Community High School District 228 which also includes Oak Forest High School, Hillcrest High School and Bremen High School.

== Overview ==
Tinley Park High School is the second oldest school of the four high schools comprising Bremen High School District 228, opening in 1961. The 1,100 students at TPHS come from sections of the villages of Tinley Park, Oak Forest, Markham, and Country Club Hills, Illinois.

== Demographics ==
With approximately 67 teachers for the estimated 1100 student body, Tinley Park has a student/teacher ratio of roughly 17:1. In 2007, the student body composed of 56.8% caucasian students, 25.8% African-American students, 10.4% Hispanic students, 4.7% Asian-American students, 0.6% Native American students, and 1.6% multi-racial students.

== Academics ==
In 2016, the average composite ACT score for Titan students was 19.0. As of 2008, Tinley Park HS is making Adequate Yearly Progress (AYP) as described by the federal No Child Left Behind Act.

== Athletics ==
Tinley Park's athletic teams play in the South Suburban Conference, governed by the Illinois High School Association (IHSA).

The school sponsors interscholastic teams for young men and women in: basketball, bowling, cross country, golf, soccer, swimming & diving, tennis, and track & field. Young men may compete in baseball, football, and wrestling. Young women may compete in cheerleading, softball, and volleyball. While not sponsored by the IHSA, the school also sponsors a pom pom team (the Titanette Dancers).

The following teams have won or placed top four in their respective IHSA state tournaments or meets:

- Cheerleading: State Champions (2006–07, 2007–08)
- Football: State Champions (1986–87)

== Notable people ==
- Garry Meier, radio personality, 1968
- Ron Gora was a physical education teacher and swimming coach. He competed in swimming at the 1952 Summer Olympics.
- Denise Richards, American actress, freshman year
