= Country Club Hills, Illinois =

- City
- Flag Seal
- Nickname: "The Crossroads of Opportunity"
- Motto: "Honoring our heritage while embracing our future"
- Location of Country Club Hills in Cook County, Illinois.

- Location within Chicago metropolitan area Location within Illinois Location within the United States
- Coordinates: 41°33′44″N 87°43′15″W
- Country: United States
- State: Illinois
- County: Cook
- Townships: Bremen, Rich
- Incorporated: 1958

Government
  - Type: Mayor-Aldermanic council
  - Mayor: James W. Ford

Area
  - Total: 4.99 sq mi (12.92 km^{2})
  - Land: 4.97 sq mi (12.87 km^{2})
  - Water: 0.015 sq mi (0.04 km^{2}) 0.41%

Population (2020)
  - Total: 16,775
  - Density: 3,375.1/sq mi (1,303.14/km^{2})

Standard of living (2007-11)
  - Per capita income: $25,563
  - Median home value: $161,900
- ZIP code(s): 60478
- Area code(s): 708
- Geocode: 17-16691
- FIPS code: 17-16691
- Website: countryclubhills.org

Country Club Hills is a city in Cook County, Illinois, United States. It is a suburb south of Chicago. The population was 16,775 at the 2020 census.

== History ==
10,000 years ago, during a glacial period, there was a complex of moraines in this area, before modern times.

Country Club Hills was historically known as Copper's Grove, a German Farmer-based place, throughout the 1800s. It was used for growing crops, and a lot more at that time.

In the 1950s, Copper's Grove started to transition into present-day Country Club Hills, where farms started to move away, and started to get more populated. As a result, Country Club Hills became an incorporated city in 1958. The first town hall was located on a farmhouse on the southeastern corner of present-day Cicero Ave. and 183rd St. That building relocated to currently the Police Department building on 175th St in 1975.

The city has been developing rapidly since then, especially in 2006, where the city used a $16 million municipal bond to build a $5 million amphitheatre on the City Campus, a $2 million fire station, an upgraded community park, and various infrastructure improvement projects.

== Geography ==
According to the 2021 census gazetteer files, Country Club Hills has a total area of 4.99 square miles (12.92 km^{2}), of which 4.97 square miles (12.87 km^{2}) (or 99.66%) is land and 0.02 square miles (0.05 km^{2}) (or 0.34%) is water.

Country Club Hills is neighbored by Hazel Crest to the east, Flossmoor and Matteson to the south, Oak Forest to the northwest, Markham to the north, and the Cook County Forest Preserves and Tinley Park to the west.

== Demographics ==
Historical population
Census	Pop.	Note	%±
1960	3,421		—
1970	6,920		102.3%
1980	14,676		112.1%
1990	15,431		5.1%
2000	16,169		4.8%
2010	16,541		2.3%
2020	16,775		1.4%
U.S. Decennial Census

=== Racial and ethnic composition ===
Country Club Hills, Illinois – Racial and ethnic composition Note: the US Census treats Hispanic/Latino as an ethnic category. This table excludes Latinos from the racial categories and assigns them to a separate category. Hispanics/Latinos may be of any race.
Race / Ethnicity (NH = Non-Hispanic)	Pop 2000	Pop 2010	Pop 2020	% 2000	% 2010	% 2020
White alone (NH)	2,248	1,343	960	13.90%	8.12%	5.72%
Black or African American alone (NH)	13,167	14,299	14,365	81.43%	86.45%	85.63%
Native American or Alaska Native alone (NH)	19	34	20	0.12%	0.21%	0.12%
Asian alone (NH)	164	162	129	1.01%	0.98%	0.77%
Pacific Islander alone (NH)	0	2	1	0.00%	0.01%	0.01%
Other race alone (NH)	19	14	46	0.12%	0.08%	0.27%
Mixed Race or Multi-Racial (NH)	272	226	408	1.68%	1.37%	2.43%
Hispanic or Latino (any race)	280	461	846	1.73%	2.79%	5.04%
Total	16,169	16,541	16,775	100.00%	100.00%	100.00%

=== 2020 census ===
As of the 2020 census, Country Club Hills had a population of 16,775. The median age was 39.1 years. 25.7% of residents were under the age of 18 and 17.5% of residents were 65 years of age or older. For every 100 females there were 79.9 males, and for every 100 females age 18 and over there were 73.4 males age 18 and over.

100.0% of residents lived in urban areas, while 0.0% lived in rural areas.

There were 5,765 households in Country Club Hills, of which 35.8% had children under the age of 18 living in them. Of all households, 34.9% were married-couple households, 14.3% were households with a male householder and no spouse or partner present, and 45.9% were households with a female householder and no spouse or partner present. About 25.1% of all households were made up of individuals and 11.9% had someone living alone who was 65 years of age or older.

There were 6,164 housing units, of which 6.5% were vacant. The homeowner vacancy rate was 2.4% and the rental vacancy rate was 8.3%.

=== Income and poverty ===
The median income for a household in the city was $70,306, and the median income for a family was $85,357. Males had a median income of $51,563 versus $42,955 for females. The per capita income for the city was $30,318. About 11.2% of families and 12.3% of the population were below the poverty line, including 12.7% of those under age 18 and 10.8% of those age 65 or over.

== Arts and culture ==
In 2006, Country Club Hills became the location of Chicago metropolitan area's largest Wal-Mart Supercenter at over 203,000 square feet (18,900 m^{2}). The development was an anchor to the first phase of the Gatling Square Mile, Cook County's largest parcel of undeveloped land at about 400 acres (1.6 km^{2}).

Country Club Hills is part of the Grande Prairie Public Library District. The Grande Prairie Public Library is located in nearby Hazel Crest.

== Government ==
Country Club Hills is divided between two congressional districts. Nearly all of the city is in Illinois's 2nd congressional district, but some small areas along the city's western edge – primarily between 179th and 183rd Streets west of Lavergne Avenue – are in the 1st district.

== Education ==
Since 1967, Country Club Hills has been home to Bremen Community High School District 228's Hillcrest High School, located at 175th and Pulaski (Crawford), (which serves most of the city north of 183rd St.). The school has been on an academic watch list for 6 years, and is currently in a "restructuring plan" to increase school academics. Parts of the city west of Cicero Ave, and North of 183rd St/I-80 attends Tinley Park High School, also in Bremen Community High School District 228. The southern half of the city (South of 183rd St) attends Rich Central High School, which is in Rich Township School District 227.

Country Club Hills School District 160 serves most of the city, which contains 2 elementary schools, and Southwood Middle School. Prairie-Hills School District 144 serves portions of the city north of 175th St. and east of Pulaski Rd., which contains 6 elementary schools, and Prairie-Hills Junior High School in neighboring Markham.

== Transportation ==
Pace provides bus service on multiple routes connecting Country Club Hills to destinations across the Southland.

== Notable people ==
- Danny Clark, linebacker for the New York Giants
- Marquice Cole, defensive back for the New York Jets
- Herb Coleman, American player of gridiron football
- Dee Dee Davis, actress, best known in her role as Bryana “Baby Girl” Thomkins on the Bernie Mac Show
- Bucky Irving, running back for the Tampa Bay Buccaneers
- Koko Taylor, blues singer

== See also ==
- List of U.S. communities with African-American majority populations in 2020
