= Midlothian, Illinois =

- Village
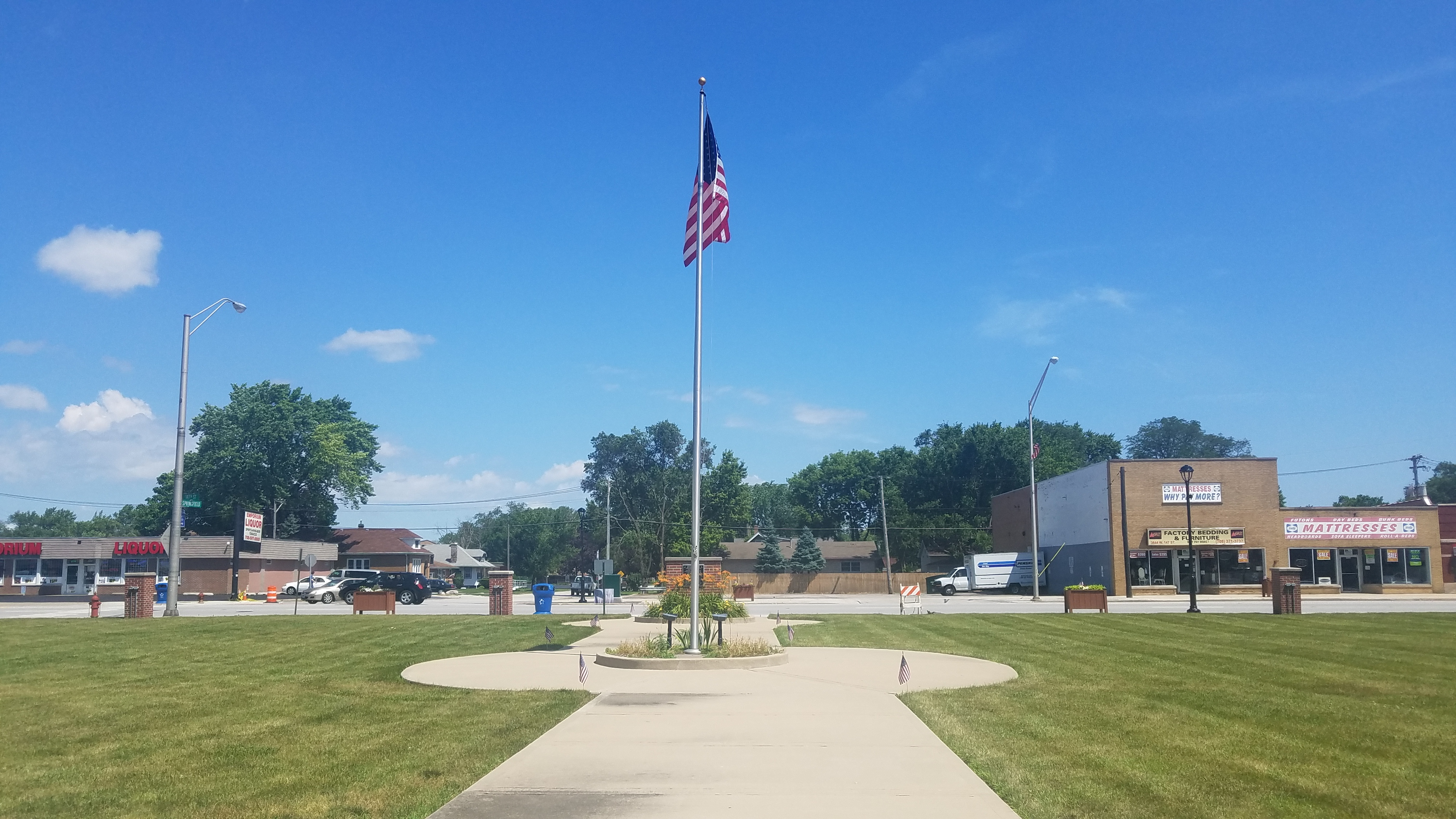
- A view of the US flag and 147th Street, in Downtown Midlothian.

- Flag Seal Logo
- Nickname: The community that pride built
- Location of Midlothian in Cook County, Illinois.

- Location within Greater Chicago Location within Illinois Location within the United States
- Coordinates: 41°37′35″N 87°43′17″W
- Country: United States
- State: Illinois
- County: Cook
- Township: Bremen
- Incorporated: March 17, 1927
- Named for: Midlothian, Scotland

Government
  - Type: Council-manager
  - President or Mayor: Gary L'Heureux (Unite Midlothian)
  - Clerk: Allen Moskal

Area
  - Total: 2.82 sq mi (7.30 km^{2})
  - Land: 2.82 sq mi (7.30 km^{2})
  - Water: 0 sq mi (0.00 km^{2}) 0%

Population (2020)
  - Total: 14,325
  - Density: 5,081.1/sq mi (1,961.84/km^{2})
- Demonym: Midlothianite

Standard of living (2007-11)
  - Per capita income: $22,945
  - Median home value: $100,000
- ZIP code(s): 60445
- Area code: 708
- Geocode: 48892
- FIPS code: 17-48892
- Website: villageofmidlothian.net

Midlothian (/mɪdˈloʊθiən/) is a village in Cook County, Illinois, United States. It is a southwestern suburb of Chicago. As of the 2020 census the population was 14,325.

== History ==
Statue of Saint Christopher outside St. Augustine Parish

Like many southwest suburbs of Chicago in the 1800s and early 1900s, the area now known as the Village of Midlothian consisted of a few area farmers being surrounded by large and small endeavors alike as the industrial age began its exponential expansion process in the Bremen Township in Cook County, Illinois community. By 1854, the sprawling landscape comprising the township of Bremen had a trail of railroad track carrying both passengers and commodities between Chicago and Joliet on the Chicago, Rock Island and Pacific Railroad. It had been a somewhat brutal battle for the Illinois Central Railroad over the decades, with Stephen A. Douglas and Abraham Lincoln working hard to establish the presence of the Illinois Central Railroad on a State level until Douglas moved to the federal level. By 1850, Douglas was busy working on federally mandated development of transportation plans into law at a federal level for the benefit of the Illinois Central Railroad.

Explosions were not uncommon in gunpowder factories and storage facilities and 12 years later in 1906, an explosion leveled the DuPont facility. Although there is currently no clear evidence as to the precise location of the facility, apparently the shock-waves from the explosion traveled a decent enough distance in which the windows of the Midlothian Country Club were shattered, according to a report on November 8, 1906, in the Charlotte News. It also appears the Associated Press distributed the geographical location of the facility to be situated in Tinley Park, however a 1900 Homesteader's Map shows the DuPont property to be closer to what would become Oak Forest in 1947 rather than Tinley Park. Eventually the northern portion of the DuPont Farm and Ammunition Storage property was eventually annexed by the Village of Midlothian, while the rest of the DuPont property was acquired by Cook County, Illinois and developed into what is now the Midlothian Meadows Forest Preserve (part of the Cook County Forest Preserve system)

Despite land speculation and sporadic development growing from the direction of what would become the Village of Robbins in 1917, dirt roads continued to act as an uncontrollable barrier to a variety of economic activities, such as delivering goods and services. While rain of any slight measure was a nuisance, it didn't take much to render the roadways virtually unusable by the wagons being pulled by horses. The extremely and extraordinarily wealthy members of the Midlothian Country Club found such a method of transportation enough of an inconvenience, a group of individuals decided to petition the State of Illinois for a charter to form the Midlothian - Blue Island Railroad and to lay tracks from Blue Island straight to the front lawn of the country club.

The initial charter approved a separate track to begin in Blue Island, Illinois and ending on the Midlothian Country Club grounds. However, the Midlothian - Blue Island Railroad negotiated with the Chicago-Rock Island Railroad to build either the longest spur track or the Shortest Railroad in the World, as it became known as. Rather than laying new rails all the way from Blue Island, they would use Rexford Crossing as a turn around point and then lay track a short distance away to the country club. As part of the arrangement, a station was erected in place of what constituted Rexford Crossing and the station was renamed to "Midlothian." Although it is unclear who exactly paid for the construction, ownership of the building was eventually acquired by the Chicago, Rock Island and Pacific while the stockholders of the Midlothian - Blue Island Railroad retained ownership of the rails and all of the rights and responsibilities associated with such ownership. All rail cars and engines were purchased by the Midlothian - Blue Island Railroad and not the Chicago, Rock Island and Pacific. Although the club would not be annexed to Midlothian for a few decades, the Midlothian train station was located within the vicinity of the original boundaries for the village and eventually considered a part of the downtown area of Midlothian, which meant some of the tracks were to be governed by the municipal codes of the village. Bremen Township and Cook County may have had property-related laws the company was supposed to adhere to, but even more telling is the absence of the company in a number of Railway and Warehouse Commission annual reports. By 1927, the Village of Midlothian was incorporated and at the end of the summer season in 1928, the Midlothian - Blue Island Railroad tracks were removed, thereby ending any potential track maintenance issues or conflicts with the village.

By the turn of the century, the Village of Midlothian was still primarily a farming and forested area, despite activities conducted by the Midlothian Country Club creating a short layover for passenger traffic to and from the Midlothian train station. This stalling of development was partially driven by the housing speculation crash after the 1893 World's Columbian's Fair, especially the property that would eventually become the Village of Robbins in 1917. In addition, a large swath of the southwest suburbs of Chicago can quickly become quite soggy from a variety of sources. Contemplating the odds of a flood or other natural disaster is a common contemplation when considering home ownership. The rolling hills surrounding Midlothian and the creeks running through its fabric have always presented a natural path downward for water to travel without much width to the creeks to contain a heavy and steady rainfall. Therefore, until paved roads shifted from being a luxury to that of a necessity, families with names such as Woerheide, Largent, William Schwartz, Frank Coole, Benjamin Coole and William J. Shedd all had to contend with commerce-related issues all centering on roads that could be rendered virtually useless in a matter of minutes and potentially last for days. Even the construction of the train station has not seemed to attract significant passenger traffic over the decades, with little commerce being conducted in Midlothian other than farming, harvesting limestone and gunpowder manufacturing. The first stationmaster was a woman and by 1912, R.K. Cummings was appointed first regular agent of the Chicago, Rock Island and Pacific Railroad. In that same year, Cummings and two monthly ticket holders lived in the vicinity.

The Midlothian Fire Department was organized in 1924, possibly in preparation for the first attempt at incorporating the village. However, for unknown reasons, the proposition was defeated and it wasn't until three years later in 1927 the residents would vote their approval of establishing the Village of Midlothian. The Village of Midlothian was formally incorporated March 17, 1927. Although there are no clear records on why the name was chosen, there is common conclusion they adopted the name of the train station with perhaps hopes of garnering a sense of similar prestige for the village as was being generated by the golf club at the time, if not also marketing abilities. The following month, John H. Hamilton was elected as the village's first president and by the end of summer 1928, all of the rails belonging to the Midlothian - Blue Island Railroad were removed, leaving Midlothian with one train line. By 1929, Midlothian had its first newspaper, The Messenger owned by the Andrews brothers. Kevin McCann was the first Editor In chief of the publication located above the old Largent store on 147th and Kildare, who later went on to serve as aide-de-camp to General Dwight Eisenhower during World War II as well as working with the General on his two books.

In the 1930s and '40s, homes continued to be built for people moving to and settling down in Midlothian. The Kreis Brothers opened the Ford Garage (where the village's fire engine was kept) and Chuck Cavallini began selling ice cream from his corner "Sweet Shop". In 1949, a Village Hall was constructed at the intersection of 148th and Pulaski, where village employees and officials still work out of as of 2014. As part of the architecture, divisions of the Village such as the police and fire departments are attached to the main building. Across the parking lot along Waverly Avenue is the public works offices and garage while the VFW Hall is across from the entrance to the police department on Pulaski.

== Geography ==
For genealogical purposes, historical government records frequently reference Midlothian property as Township 36 north, Range 13, East of 3rd Principal Meridian. Midlothian is home to the Cook County Forest Preserve of Midlothian Meadows, and home to Belly Button Hill, a sledding hill at 150th & Kilbourn. It is also home to Natalie Creek and the Midlothian Creek. Midlothian is part of the South Suburbs of Chicago and is in the Bremen Township.

According to the 2021 census gazetteer files, Midlothian has a total area of 2.82 square miles (7.30 km^{2}), all land.

=== Climate ===
Like most of Cook County, Midlothian can be expected to be very warm in the summer, but very cold in the winter.

Climate data for Midlothian, Illinois
Month	Jan	Feb	Mar	Apr	May	Jun	Jul	Aug	Sep	Oct	Nov	Dec	Year
Mean daily maximum °F (°C)	30 (−1)	35 (2)	46 (8)	59 (15)	70 (21)	80 (27)	84 (29)	82 (28)	75 (24)	63 (17)	48 (9)	35 (2)	59 (15)
Mean daily minimum °F (°C)	14 (−10)	18 (−8)	28 (−2)	39 (4)	49 (9)	59 (15)	64 (18)	62 (17)	55 (13)	42 (6)	32 (0)	21 (−6)	40 (5)

== Demographics ==
Historical population
Census	Pop.	Note	%±
1930	1,775		—
1940	2,430		36.9%
1950	3,216		32.3%
1960	6,605		105.4%
1970	14,422		118.3%
1980	14,274		−1.0%
1990	14,372		0.7%
2000	14,315		−0.4%
2010	14,819		3.5%
2020	14,325		−3.3%
U.S. Decennial Census

=== Racial and ethnic composition ===
Midlothian village, Illinois – Racial and ethnic composition Note: the US Census treats Hispanic/Latino as an ethnic category. This table excludes Latinos from the racial categories and assigns them to a separate category. Hispanics/Latinos may be of any race.
Race / Ethnicity (NH = Non-Hispanic)	Pop 2000	Pop 2010	Pop 2020	% 2000	% 2010	% 2020
White alone (NH)	12,037	9,682	7,107	84.09%	65.34%	49.61%
Black or African American alone (NH)	869	1,635	1,880	6.07%	11.03%	13.12%
Native American or Alaska Native alone (NH)	16	15	11	0.11%	0.10%	0.08%
Asian alone (NH)	233	206	196	1.63%	1.39%	1.37%
Pacific Islander alone (NH)	3	4	3	0.02%	0.03%	0.02%
Other race alone (NH)	23	18	41	0.16%	0.12%	0.29%
Mixed race or Multiracial (NH)	158	216	482	1.10%	1.46%	3.36%
Hispanic or Latino (any race)	976	3,043	4,605	6.82%	20.53%	32.15%
Total	14,135	14,819	14,325	100.00%	100.00%	100.00%

=== 2020 census ===
As of the 2020 census, Midlothian had a population of 14,325. The median age was 37.3 years. 23.0% of residents were under the age of 18 and 13.3% of residents were 65 years of age or older. For every 100 females there were 97.7 males, and for every 100 females age 18 and over there were 96.4 males age 18 and over.

100.0% of residents lived in urban areas, while 0.0% lived in rural areas.

There were 5,204 households in Midlothian, including 3,786 family households. Of all households, 33.6% had children under the age of 18 living in them, 44.8% were married-couple households, 19.5% were households with a male householder and no spouse or partner present, and 28.3% were households with a female householder and no spouse or partner present. About 25.6% of all households were made up of individuals and 9.1% had someone living alone who was 65 years of age or older.

There were 5,522 housing units, of which 5.8% were vacant. The homeowner vacancy rate was 2.0% and the rental vacancy rate was 7.9%.

=== Income and poverty ===
The median income for a household in the village was $61,067, and the median income for a family was $80,348. Males had a median income of $45,741 versus $34,098 for females. The per capita income for the village was $29,855. About 10.0% of families and 9.1% of the population were below the poverty line, including 7.2% of those under age 18 and 15.4% of those age 65 or over.

== Arts and culture ==
Midlothian is known in the area for hosting the annual Fiesta at the St. Augustine Catholic Church at 147th & Keeler.

== Parks and recreation ==
- Kostner Park
- Roesner Park
- Bremen Heights Park
- Waverly Park
- Memorial Park
- Scout Park

== Government ==
The Government of Midlothian is run by the Mayor & Village President, the Village Clerk, and 6 Village Trustees. Village Board Meetings are often held on the 2nd and 4th Wednesday of each month, and Committee Meetings are held on the 1st and 3rd Wednesday of each month at 7:00 PM.

Midlothian Elected Officials
Name	Elected position	Party affiliation
Gary L'Heureux	Mayor and Village President	Midlothian First Party
Allen Moskal	Village Clerk	Midlothian First Party
Kathy Johnson	Trustee	Midlothian First Party
Jack Hille	Trustee	Midlothian First Party
Kathleen Johnson	Trustee	Midlothian First Party
Sandra L. Crowley	Trustee	Independent
Anthony "Tony" Burbatt	Trustee	Independent
Donald Killelea	Trustee	Independent

Midlothian is governed by the Midlothian First Party, with the village board being split between Midlothian First and independents.

=== List of village presidents ===
Name	Term start	Term end	Political Party
John H. Hamilton	1927	1929	Independent
Richard J. White	1929	1946 (resigned)	Independent (1926), People's Party (1935), United Party (1941)
John S. Knight	1946 (appointed)	1947	Independent
Arthur Ladwig	1948	1952	Greater Midlothian Party
Henry Milen	1953	1961	Independent
Harry Raday	1961	1985	Independent
Thomas "Tom" J. Murawski	1985	2009	Independent
Terrence "Terry" Stephens	2009	2013	Independent
Sharon L. Rybak	2013	2017	Independent
Gary L'Heureux	2017	present	Unite Midlothian

== Infrastructure ==
=== Transportation ===
Midlothian is mainly known for the Midlothian station and being near the Tri-state Tollway (I-294) and I-57. The Midlothian station provides Metra commuter rail service along the Rock Island District. Trains travel north to LaSalle Street Station in Chicago, and south to Joliet Transportation Center. Pace provides bus service on multiple routes connecting Midlothian to destinations across the Southland.

== Notable people ==
- James Augustine - retired American professional basketball player, born in Midlothian
- Gary Bettenhausen - auto racer
- Jim Browne - former American professional basketball player active in the 1940s, born in Midlothian
- John Coyne - novelist, was caddie master at Midlothian Country Club
- John Curulewski - guitarist, original member of Styx
- Jaclyn Dowaliby - murder victim
- Pat Fitzgerald - Football player and coach, born in Midlothian
- Don A. Moore - Illinois judge, lawyer, and politician
- Johnny Mostil - outfielder for Chicago White Sox
- Ken Wahl (Anthony Calzaretta) - film and television actor, star of Wiseguy, Bremen High School graduate (1975)

== See also ==
- Shooting of Jemel Roberson by a Midlothian police officer
- Midlothian Country Club golf course designed by English golf course architect Herbert J. Tweedie; opened in 1898
- Bachelor's Grove Cemetery
