= Frankfort Square Park District =

Park district in Illinois, United States

The Frankfort Square Park District ("FSPD") is an Illinois organization that acquires funding, performs maintenance on parks, and serves members of the Frankfort Square community with recreation activities. It is located about 45 miles (72 km) south of Chicago. The Frankfort Square Park District oversees 27 parks with over 500 acres (2 km^{2}) of parkland. Many of the parks and facilities can be used year-round, including two outdoor ice rinks.

A number of the Frankfort Square Park District parks are located in the vicinity of several local public schools. The local school districts, Lincoln-Way Community High School District 210 and Summit Hill School District 161, have designated land and facilities for the park district to use for community participation. This symbiotic relationship allows the park district to offer more classes for the community, while also engaging the school districts’ community involvement.

In 2007, the Frankfort Square Park District won the Gold Medal Award from the National Recreation and Park Association.

The current executive director for the Frankfort Square Park District is Jim Randall.

== Services ==
The Frankfort Square Park District maintains over 500 acres (2 km^{2}) of parkland within the towns of Frankfort and Tinley Park, Illinois. The local school districts allocate land as well as rooms for park district programs to use.

=== L.A.P. ===
The Lincoln-Way Area Parks (L.A.P.) is a cooperative program at Lincoln-Way East High School that the Frankfort Square, Frankfort, and Mokena Park Districts offer to residents. An agreement was entered into by and between the 3-member districts and the Board of Education of Lincoln-Way High School District 210 in 1994. The agreement grants use of the Lincoln-Way East field house, swimming pool, fitness center, and gymnasium for the educational, recreational, and social purposes for park district residents and the Lincoln-Way High School community. L.A.P. will cease operations in August, 2008, and the Frankfort Square Park District will be granted exclusive use of the new Lincoln-Way North High School campus for a variety of park district programming, similar to the current L.A.P offerings.

=== SSSRA ===
The Frankfort Square Park District has been a member of the South Suburban Special Recreation Association (SSSRA) since 1989. The FSPD donated park property and was involved in the entire construction process from the initial planning stages through the completion of SSSRA's administrative offices and ongoing maintenance issues. FSPD's Executive Director drafted an agreement with ten member districts to complete the sale of alternate bonds in the amount of US$750,000.

Illinois State Representative, Kevin McCarthy additionally secured a US$500,000 State Line Item Grant for office construction. SSSRA's new home, completed in 2003, has given the association greater stability and visibility within the community as well has allowed for more programming to better serve residents.

=== Square Links Golf Course ===
In 2002, the Frankfort Square Park District purchased a 9-hole golf course located about two miles (3 km) from the park districts administration building. Square Links is a 1,749-yard (1,599 m), par 32 golf course. It features a 400,000-square-foot (37,000 m^{2}) driving range, an 18-hole natural grass putting course, practice sand bunker, and a practice chipping area. The park district also offers private and group golf lessons.

=== Athletic Leagues ===
Throughout the year, the Frankfort Square Park District offers community members the opportunity to participate in various athletic leagues. Kids can join teams playing indoor soccer and basketball throughout the winter. In the warmer months, leagues of baseball, softball, and outdoor soccer use many of the park district's playing fields. Classes in gymnastics are also offered at the Lincoln-Way East High School gymnasium for beginner and intermediate participants. Additionally, karate and dance classes are also offered. Adults can join athletic leagues of softball and bean bag tournaments.

=== Scholarships ===
The Frankfort Square Park District has offered scholarships to graduating high school seniors seeking a four-year college education since 2007. The College Scholarship Golf Tournament played at Square Links Golf Course helps to fund the scholarship fund. In the inaugural year, five students were awarded US$1,000 scholarships.

=== Early Learning Center ===
The Early Learning Center is a preschool program that is offered by the Frankfort Square Park District. The program was established in 1981. It is centered on developing the physical, social, emotional, and cognitive skills of children aged three to five. The Early Learning Center grew from two classes a day in 1989 to four classes when the new community center was constructed in 1991. After the passing of a referendum to expand the center, new classrooms were added, doubling the current space. Additionally, a new playground was built adjacent to the classrooms.

== History ==
=== Early years ===
The Frankfort Square Park District was incorporated in 1974. The first community meetings were held in local homes because no administration building had been established. Dennis O’Brien was hired part time in 1975 on a contractual basis and he worked as park director until 1981. He wrote 10 park programs per year and supervised the offerings. The staff began with one semi-full-time employee, Diane Veltman.

The first administration building was erected next to the old Summit Hill Junior High School. Today this building is still being used for group meetings as well as a concession stand.

In 1990, US$1 million in financing was provided to the park district to build the current community center located on Braemar Lane in Frankfort. The construction was completed in 1991.

=== 1991 - Today ===
In 2002, a majority of voters approved a US$5 million referendum, providing funds to meet master plan objectives including expansion of programming, facilities, and properties. The expansion of the Community Center provided for additional offices, board room, kitchen, and preschool classrooms and was completed in 2003.

In late 2007, the FSPD was awarded the Gold Medal Award from the National Recreation and Park Association (NRPA) for excellence in park and recreation management. The park district won for a Class V district, which includes all districts with less than 25,000 residents. The Frankfort Square Park District was the only winner from Illinois in 2007.

The current Frankfort Square Park District Board of Commissioners include:

- Pamela Kohlbacher, President
- Kenneth Blackburn, Vice President
- Robert Guler, Treasurer
- Jim Randall, Secretary
- Brian Mulheran, Commissioner (appointed to vacancy)
- Barb Libowitz, Commissioner
- Dave Macek, Commissioner
- Jeff Roach, Commissioner
- Jill Simmons, Commissioner

=== Distinguished Members ===
In November 2007, the current Executive Director, Jim Randall, completed 25 years of service to the Frankfort Square Park District community. He has acquired over US$12 million for park improvements.

In 2008, the Superintendent of the Early Learning Center, Brenda Kushner, completed her 26th year at the Frankfort Square Park District. She has developed the current preschool curriculum throughout her years as the Early Learning Center director.

== List of Parks ==
Park Name	Area (acres)	Notable Features
Brookside Glen East Park	12	Walking/bike path, picnic shelter, playground
Candle Creek Park	3	Walking/bike path, pond
Community Center/Island Prairie Park	55	3 Playgrounds, 1.9-mile (3.1 km) bike path, Department of Natural Resources stocked Pond
Community Park	19.5	Fishing pond with pier, 2 basketball and 2 tennis courts
Crystal Lake Park	10	Gazebo, walking path
Dr. Julian Rogus School	5	3 Playgrounds, developed in cooperation with Summit Hill School District 161
Frankfort Square School	7	2 Playgrounds, walking path
Greenway Park	5	Not yet dedicated
Hawthorne Lakes Park	1	Playground
Hoffman Park	3	Playground, first of "new" renovated parks
Hunter Prairie park	11	2 Playgrounds, 4 soccer fields, home to Pony League Baseball field
Indian Boundary South Park	36.75	4 Baseball fields, stocked pond, Frisbee golf course
Indian Trail School	19.5	4 Baseball fields
Kingston Park	9.5	Waling path, playground
Kiwanis Park	4.5	3 Baseball fields, playground
Lake in the Glens Park	55	2 Playgrounds, walking/bike path
Lakeside Park	7	Not yet dedicated
LaPorte Meadows	9	Not yet dedicated
Lighthouse Pointe	16.5	Not yet dedicated
Odyssey Park	0.5	Playground
Plank Trail Park	7	Pond, gazebo, walking/bike path
Richfield Park	18.5	Not yet dedicated
Summit Hill Park	20	2 Playgrounds, 3 baseball fields (1 lighted), Lighted tennis courts and outdoor ice rink
Union Creek Community Park	45	4 Playgrounds, 5 baseball fields (2 lighted), dog park, skate park, inline/ice hockey rink, band shell, 2 football fields
Walnut Creek Park	12	Not yet dedicated
White Oak Park	11	Bike path, 2 ponds
Woodlawn Park	10	Pond, bike path, 2 playgrounds
Splash Park	N/A	Interactive water fountains for young children
