= Lincoln-Way North High School =

Location
- 19900 South Harlem Avenue; Frankfort, Illinois 60423; United States; 41.525710°N 87.791515°W

Information
- Type: Public High School
- Motto: It's Good To Be Gold
- Established: 2008 (9-12)
- Closed: 2016
- School district: Lincoln-Way Community High School District 210
- Principal: Mark Cohen
- Faculty: 133
- Grades: 9–12
- Enrollment: 1972
- Campus: Suburban, 90 Acres
- Colors: Vegas Gold and Black
- Athletics: Southwest Suburban Conference
- Mascot: Phoenix
- Website: www.lw210.org/north/

Lincoln-Way North High School, or LWN, was a public four-year high school located approximately one mile south of Interstate 80 at the intersection of Illinois Route 43 (Harlem Avenue), Vollmer Road, Saint Francis Road and Cox Avenue in Frankfort Square, Illinois, a southwest suburb of Chicago, in the United States. LWN was part of Lincoln-Way Community High School District 210, which also includes Lincoln-Way East High School, Lincoln-Way Central High School, and Lincoln-Way West High School.

Lincoln-Way North drew students from Tinley Park, Frankfort, Mokena, and Frankfort Square. Summit Hill School District 161 was the only feeder district for Lincoln-Way North High School. The school closed in June 2016 due to a school board vote.

Lincoln Way North was temporarily reopened in November 2023 after a ceiling collapse at Lockport Township High School Central Campus to house the displaced freshmen students.

== History ==
Lincoln-Way North opened in 2008 after voters approved a $225 million building bond referendum to build two new high schools and update the two existing schools. Lincoln-Way West opened the following year and was designed similarly to North.

LWN had been consistently been ranked among America's Best High Schools by both Newsweek and U.S. News & World Report, and the high school had a 99 percent graduation rate, with 80 percent of graduates attending post-secondary education.

On Thursday, August 13, 2015, the Lincoln-Way District 210 school board voted 5–2 to close Lincoln-Way North upon the conclusion of the 2015–2016 school year. The school closure is part of a cost reduction initiative that was established by the board with the goal of removing District 210 from the Illinois State Board of Education Financial Watch List. The school district has been struggling financially due to declining enrollment and funding, as well as gross mismanagement of the districts finances. These factors have contributed to the current investigation of the district by the SEC and the Federal Department of Justice. In 2006, when the district voted to double the number of schools in the district from two buildings to four buildings by constructing North and West, projections showed continued rapid growth within district boundaries for years to come. However, the economic downturn led to a decrease in the district's total property value from more than $4 billion to $3.5 billion and a drop in enrollment and state aid.

All students who live within North's boundaries will instead attend Lincoln-Way East beginning with the 2016–2017 school year. Lincoln-Way East will consist of students from Summit Hill District 161 and Frankfort 157C.

== Music ==
The music department consisted of three bands: the Wind Ensemble, Wind Symphony, and Symphonic Band. The department also maintained a choir, and an orchestra. Each of these musical groups performed regularly in the school's state-of-the-art performing arts center.

In addition, Lincoln-Way North was home to the Illinois Philharmonic Orchestra. In 2008, the IPO decided to make the brand-new Lincoln-Way North Performing Arts Center its new home after residing at Governors State University for many years.

The Lincoln-Way North Marching Band, called the Marching Phoenix, consisted of about 100 members. The Lincoln-Way North Marching Phoenix won the 4A Marching Band State Championship in 2009–10, 2010-11 2011–12, 2012–2013. Additionally, the marching band took first place in the 2015 Northern Illinois University Band Invitational and placed 5th overall at the 2015 Illinois State Marching Band Championships.

== Notable alumni ==
Lauren Sajewich, professional soccer player for HB Køge Kvindeelite in Koge, Denmark. She graduated from Lincoln-Way North as the "Top 10 students from the Class of 2013".
