= Lincoln-Way Central High School =

Location
- 1801 E. Lincoln Highway; New Lenox, Will County, Illinois 60451; United States; 41.5138°N 87.9298°W

Information
- School type: Public Secondary
- Motto: "Once a Knight, Always a Knight"
- Established: 1954 (9–12) LW H.S. 1977 (11–12) LW H.S.-Central; 2001 (9–12) LWC H.S.
- School district: Lincoln-Way Community H.S. District 210
- Superintendent: Scott Tingley
- Principal: Beth McNamara
- Teaching staff: 136.30 (on an FTE basis)
- Grades: 9–12
- Gender: Coed
- Enrollment: 2,017 (2023–2024)
  - Grade 9: 498 students
  - Grade 10: 538 students
  - Grade 11: 469 students
  - Grade 12: 512 students
- Average class size: 22
- Student to teacher ratio: 14.80
- Campus size: 70 acres
- Campus type: Suburban
- Colors: Red; Black
- Fight song: "Lincoln-Way Loyalty"
- Athletics conference: Southwest Suburban
- Mascot: Knight
- Team name: Knights
- Accreditation: Illinois State Board of Education
- Newspaper: The Knight Times
- Yearbook: Aegis
- Website: www.lw210.org/o/central

Lincoln-Way Central High School, LWC, or Central is a public four-year high school about 3.5 miles south of Interstate 80 near the intersection of Schoolhouse Road and Lincoln Highway in New Lenox, Illinois, a southwest suburb of Chicago, Illinois, in the United States. It is the original school of Lincoln-Way Community High School District 210, which also includes Lincoln-Way East High School and Lincoln-Way West High School. Lincoln-Way Central and Lincoln-Way West are located in New Lenox, and Lincoln-Way East is located in Frankfort. Effective since the 2016–2017 school year, Lincoln-Way North High School, in Frankfort Square, closed due to financial troubles and the district is now a three-school district. District 210 offices are located at Lincoln-Way Central.

== History ==
In June 1952, another election provided for the approval and construction of Lincoln-Way High School. The new high school district combined Joliet Township High School, Bloom Township High School, Carl Sandburg High School, and Peotone High School. The cornerstone was ceremonially installed on October 25, 1953, after construction had begun. Lincoln-Way opened its doors to students on September 7, 1954. The name of the school was selected by Mrs. Florence Pittman and the board of education officially adopted it as "Lincoln-Way". The charter members of the student body voted to have red and black as their school colors. Lyrics to the Lincoln-Way Central school song were written by Robert Taylor and Betty Tryon, set to the tune of the University of Chicago pep song.

Bond issues for additions to the original building were approved in 1957, 1960, 1962, and 1969. The 1969 bond issue approved a ninth grade building which was built north of the main building. In 1971 the north building opened up, accommodating 700 students.

In 1994, a field house was added to the campus. Then in 1998, citizens of District No. 210 approved a $60 million building bond referendum to split the existing high school freshmen-sophomore / junior-senior configuration into two separate four-year high schools while adding to the existing two schools an academic wing with 50 classrooms at each campus and Olympic-sized swimming pools. Central also added a fine arts auditorium, music classrooms, nurse office, and administrative offices (PPS). The changeover became official for the 2001–02 school year as the Central Campus opened as Lincoln-Way Central High School.

Lincoln-Way Central is known as “Lincoln-Way” by area residents because it is the original of the four high schools. Students are noted for their exceeding pride. Phrases such as "We are Central", "Once a Knight, Always a Knight", and "Knight Pride" exemplify students' school spirit.

== Music ==
Lincoln-Way Central's Music Department consists of multiple extracurricular music groups, including the Wind Ensemble and Symphonic Concert Bands, two jazz ensembles, (Jazz I and II), pep band, orchestra, guitar studio, piano, multiple choirs, including Madrigal Singers, and the school's marching band, the Marching Knights.

The Marching Knights consisted of 101 student members as of the 2012–2013 season. The group marched in the 2005 Presidential Inaugural Parade. The band has been in existence since 1954. In 2017, the Marching Knights combined with the three other Lincoln-Way area High Schools to form the Lincoln-Way Marching Band.

Notable Music Department events include:

- 2026 – Rigsbapalooza main stage
- 2020 – Macy's Thanksgiving Day Parade (postponed to 2021 due to COVID-19)
- 2019 – Tournament of Roses Parade
- 2012 – Trip to San Diego (Big Bay Balloon Parade)
- 2010 – Trip to Orlando, FL (Citrus Bowl Parade)
- 2008 – Trip to Italy
- 2007 – Opening Ceremony for I-355
- 2007 – Guitar studio and orchestra tour of Toronto, Canada
- 2005 – Presidential Inaugural Parade Participants
- 2003 – Music Department tour of Toronto, Canada (canceled due to SARS outbreak)
- 2000 – Pasadena Tournament of Roses Parade
- 1999 – ISU State Champions
- 1996 – WGI – Percussion Scholastic World Class – 4th Place
- 1995 – WGI – Percussion Scholastic World Class – 2nd Place (Silver Medal)
- 1994 – WGI – Percussion Scholastic World Class – 1st Place (Gold Medal)
- 1993 – WGI – Percussion Scholastic World Class – 2nd Place (Silver Medal)
- 1987 – Performance at the Special Olympics in South Bend, IN
- 1984 – Orange Bowl Parade and Field competition, Miami, FL (3rd place National Field Show competition)
- 1982 – Pasadena Tournament of Roses Parade
- 1974 – Marching Knights formed
- 1968 – Opening Ceremony for I-80

== Athletics ==
Lincoln-Way Central competes as a member of the Southwest Suburban Conference. The school is a member of the Illinois High School Association (IHSA), which governs most athletics and competitive activities in Illinois. Teams are called the "Knights".

The school sponsors interscholastic teams for young men and women in basketball, bowling, cross country, golf, gymnastics, soccer, swimming & diving, tennis, track & field, volleyball, esports and water polo. Young women may compete in badminton, cheerleading, poms, and softball, while young men may also compete in baseball, football, and wrestling. Now recognized by the IHSA, the school's athletic department also oversees lacrosse teams for young men and women.

The following teams have won or finished in the top four of their respective IHSA sponsored state championship tournament or meet:

- Football: State Champions (1997–98)
- Gymnastics (Boys): State Champions (2005–2006, 2010–2011)
- Softball: State Champions (2007–08)

== Notable alumni ==
- James Augustine (2002), former NBA forward for Illinois' 2005 NCAA tournament runners-up who played for the NBA's Orlando Magic (2006–08).
- Christopher Bear (2000), drummer for the band Grizzly Bear.
- Cougars, rock band
- Tony Cingrani (2007), MLB pitcher who is currently a free agent; previously pitched for the Cincinnati Reds and Los Angeles Dodgers.
- Karla DeVito, singer, actress, and voice artist.
- Ned Grabavoy (2001), Major League Soccer midfielder (2004–16); helped Real Salt Lake win 2009 MLS Cup with kick in 5-4 penalty shootout following a 1–1 draw.
- Kevin Lynch (1984), vice president of technology, Apple, Inc.
- Rob Ninkovich (2002), NFL defensive end (2006–17) for Super Bowl champion New England Patriots, played in Super Bowl XLVI, XLIX and LI, winning twice; also played for Miami Dolphins.
- Casey Paus (2001), former University of Washington quarterback
- Cory Paus (1998), former quarterback for the UCLA Bruins and Calgary Stampeders of the CFL
- Johan Reinhard, author and explorer-in-residence with the National Geographic Society. He has studied the lands and people of the Andes Mountains and Himalaya Mountains in addition to other areas.
- Mark Suppelsa (1980), radio and television anchorman at WGN-TV.
