= Old Plank Road Trail =

Old Plank Road Trail may refer to:

- Old Plank Road Trail (Wisconsin), a trail in Fond du Lac County and Sheboygan County in Wisconsin
- Old Plank Road Trail (Illinois), a trail in Cook County and Will County in Illinois
