= New Lenox, Illinois =

New Lenox
- Village
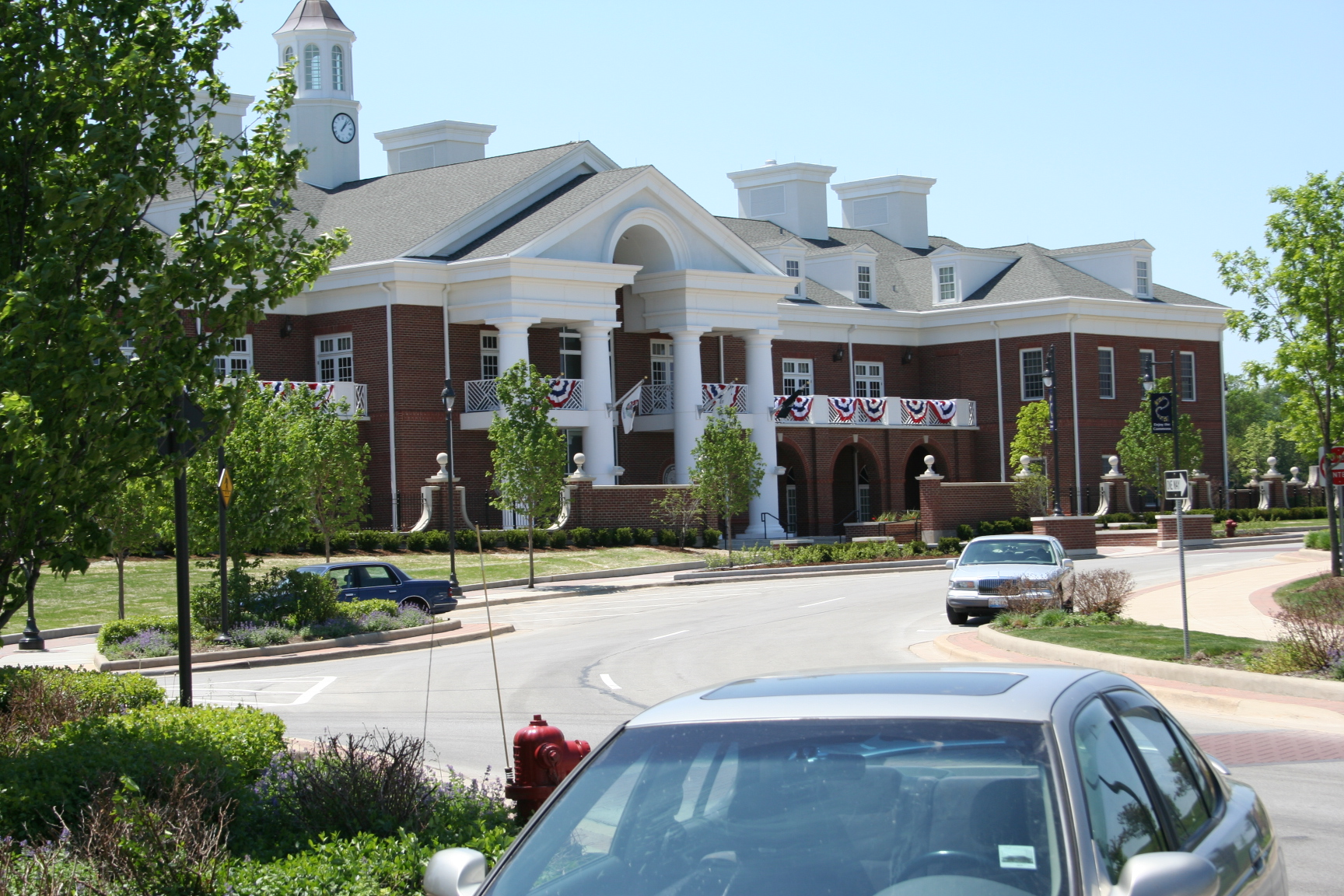
- New Lenox Village Hall

- Flag Logo
- Motto: Home of Proud Americans
- Location of New Lenox in Will County, Illinois.

- Location of Illinois in the United States
- Coordinates: 41.508251°N 87.970597°W
- Country: United States
- State: Illinois
- County: Will
- Incorporated: 1946

Government
  - Mayor: Tim Baldermann

Area
  - Total: 15.76 sq mi (40.81 km^{2})
  - Land: 15.73 sq mi (40.73 km^{2})
  - Water: 0.027 sq mi (0.07 km^{2})

Population (2020)
  - Total: 27,214
  - Density: 1,730.3/sq mi (668.08/km^{2})
- Time zone: UTC-6 (CST)
  - Summer (DST): UTC-5 (CDT)
- ZIP code: 60451
- Area codes: 815 and 779
- FIPS code: 17-52584
- Website: newlenox.net

New Lenox is a village in central Will County, Illinois, United States. It is a Southwest suburb of Chicago. The village population was 27,214 as of the 2020 census. New Lenox has schools like Lincoln-Way West High School, Providence Catholic High School, and Lincoln-Way Central High School.

== History ==
The first European settlement in the modern-day village of New Lenox was settled near the intersection of US-30 and Gougar Road as Van Horne Point. New Lenox Township was established when Will County was created in 1852 with the building of the Chicago, Rock Island and Pacific Railroad main line from Chicago to Omaha. Originally named Tracey in honor of the general superintendent of the Rock Island Railroad, the town was later renamed by New Lenox Township's first Rock Island Line supervisor, John van Duser, in honor of Lenox, New York, Van Duser's hometown, at the request of Tracey. The Village of New Lenox was incorporated on October 4, 1946 under the guidance of F. Carlton Cole, Walter Baers, and 44 other community leaders.

In 1829, fur traders Aaron Friend and Joseph Brown established an outpost along the north side of Hickory Creek (near today’s Gougar Road), which was one of the earliest settlements in Will County. Friend moved west with Black Hawk's British Band, Ho-Chunk, and Potawatomi after the Black Hawk War of 1832. In 1830, William Rice Sr. and William Rice Jr. arrived and began farming and building a log cabin, which they sold along with their land to John Gougar on behalf of his father William Gougar. In 1832, “Uncle Billy” Gougar established a post office at his farm where area residents would pick up their mail. The Gougar farm became the center of activity in the area.

Joseph Norman, who opened the second area sawmill in 1833, was also the father of Elizabeth Norman, born in 1832, and was the first child born in New Lenox Township. In 1852, the coming of the Rock Island Railroad changed the settlement of the Township. Before the railroad, farmers hauled their goods to the I & M Canal or by wagon all the way to larger cities like Chicago. The railroad brought distant markets to the farmer, along with more visitors and the mail. Later three additional railroads: the Wabash, the Michigan Central, and the Elgin, Joliet and Eastern all crossed New Lenox Township. Gradually the area east of Gougar Crossing along the railroad tracks became the new center of town and so the Village of New Lenox began.

The village was platted in 1858. The name Tracy was the name shown on the original plat to honor the general superintendent of the Rock Island Railroad. Tracy requested that another name be found. The first supervisor for New Lenox Township J. Van Duser had named the Township New Lenox from the town of Lenox, New York, which was Van Duser's home town. In 1863, the name for the new settlement officially became New Lenox after the Township. The coming of the Rock Island Railroad in 1852 changed the settlement of the Township considerably. Previously farmers could do "cash crop" farming by hauling the products to the I & M Canal or by wagon all the way to larger cities like Chicago. The presence of the railroad brought distant markets to the farmer. Eventually New Lenox Township was served by three additional railroads: the Wabash, the Michigan Central, and the Elgin, Joliet and Eastern.

The most prominent citizen of New Lenox at the turn of the century was H. N. Higinbotham. Although Mr. Higinbotham's home was located in New Lenox, he became famous in Chicago where he was a partner in Marshall Field's, a banker, and the organizing and supervising force behind the World's Columbian Exposition of 1893. He was a colleague and friend of most of Chicago's leaders, including George Pullman, Marshall Field, and the Palmers. Mr. Higinbotham once owned the farms that later became Pilcher Park. He owned and operated one of the largest carnation and rose greenhouse businesses in this area. In 1898, the first rural Bell telephone company in Illinois came to New Lenox. By 1905, there were 132 subscribers. The switchboard operators worked in homes so that 24 hour service could be given to customers to handle emergencies. The Deadmore home at 221 Haven Avenue was the first location for the switchboard.

New Lenox is known as "The Home of Proud Americans", which exemplifies the quality of life in the community.

== Geography ==
New Lenox is located approximately 36 miles southwest of downtown Chicago at 41°30′30″N 87°58′14″W (41.508251, -87.970597). According to the 2010 census, New Lenox has a total area of 15.683 square miles (40.62 km^{2}), of which 15.66 square miles (40.56 km^{2}) (or 99.85%) is land and 0.023 square miles (0.06 km^{2}) (or 0.15%) is water. It is bordered by Joliet to the northwest, Ingalls Park to the west, Mokena to the east, Frankfort to the southeast and Manhattan to the south.

=== Climate ===
The average temperatures in New Lenox range from 21 °F (-6 °C) in January to 73 °F (23 °C) in July. There are, on average, 137 days of the daily low temperature being below or at freezing, and 86 days when the daily high is above 80 °F (27 °C).

Climate data for New Lenox
Month	Jan	Feb	Mar	Apr	May	Jun	Jul	Aug	Sep	Oct	Nov	Dec	Year
Record high °F (°C)	65 (18)	73 (23)	88 (31)	92 (33)	96 (36)	104 (40)	103 (39)	102 (39)	99 (37)	91 (33)	78 (26)	71 (22)	104 (40)
Mean daily maximum °F (°C)	30 (−1)	35 (2)	47 (8)	60 (16)	72 (22)	81 (27)	85 (29)	82 (28)	76 (24)	64 (18)	48 (9)	35 (2)	60 (15)
Daily mean °F (°C)	21 (−6)	27 (−3)	46 (8)	48 (9)	60 (16)	69 (21)	74 (23)	66 (19)	64 (18)	47 (8)	39 (4)	27 (−3)	49 (10)
Mean daily minimum °F (°C)	13 (−11)	19 (−7)	28 (−2)	37 (3)	48 (9)	58 (14)	63 (17)	61 (16)	53 (12)	41 (5)	31 (−1)	20 (−7)	39 (4)
Record low °F (°C)	−27 (−33)	−20 (−29)	−8 (−22)	7 (−14)	24 (−4)	35 (2)	40 (4)	39 (4)	28 (−2)	17 (−8)	−2 (−19)	−25 (−32)	−27 (−33)
Source 1: www.intellicast.com
Source 2: myforecast.co/bin/climate.m?city= 15361&zip_code=60451

== Demographics ==
Historical population
Census	Pop.	Note	%±
1950	1,235		—
1960	1,750		41.7%
1970	2,855		63.1%
1980	5,792		102.9%
1990	9,627		66.2%
2000	17,771		84.6%
2010	24,394		37.3%
2020	27,214		11.6%
U.S. Decennial Census

=== Racial and ethnic composition ===
New Lenox village, Illinois – Racial and ethnic composition Note: the US Census treats Hispanic/Latino as an ethnic category. This table excludes Latinos from the racial categories and assigns them to a separate category. Hispanics/Latinos may be of any race.
Race / Ethnicity (NH = Non-Hispanic)	Pop 2000	Pop 2010	Pop 2020	% 2000	% 2010	% 2020
White alone (NH)	16,991	22,432	23,808	95.61%	91.96%	87.48%
Black or African American alone (NH)	53	158	314	0.30%	0.65%	1.15%
Native American or Alaska Native alone (NH)	10	23	22	0.06%	0.09%	0.08%
Asian alone (NH)	64	180	290	0.36%	0.74%	1.07%
Native Hawaiian or Pacific Islander alone (NH)	0	1	3	0.00%	0.00%	0.01%
Other race alone (NH)	2	7	39	0.01%	0.03%	0.14%
Mixed race or Multiracial (NH)	88	197	795	0.50%	0.81%	2.92%
Hispanic or Latino (any race)	563	1,396	1,943	3.17%	5.72%	7.14%
Total	17,771	24,394	27,214	100.00%	100.00%	100.00%

=== 2020 census ===
As of the 2020 census, New Lenox had a population of 27,214. The median age was 38.4 years. 26.7% of residents were under the age of 18 and 12.7% of residents were 65 years of age or older. For every 100 females there were 97.5 males, and for every 100 females age 18 and over there were 94.0 males age 18 and over.

98.7% of residents lived in urban areas, while 1.3% lived in rural areas.

There were 9,203 households in New Lenox, of which 40.5% had children under the age of 18 living in them. Of all households, 68.0% were married-couple households, 9.8% were households with a male householder and no spouse or partner present, and 18.0% were households with a female householder and no spouse or partner present. About 16.0% of all households were made up of individuals and 7.9% had someone living alone who was 65 years of age or older.

There were 9,458 housing units, of which 2.7% were vacant. The homeowner vacancy rate was 0.9% and the rental vacancy rate was 6.3%.

=== 2010 census ===
As of the census of 2010, there were 24,394 people, 8,000 households, and 6,547 families residing in the village. The population density was 2,424.9 inhabitants per square mile (936.3/km^{2}). There were 8,244 housing units at an average density of 819.5 per square mile (316.4/km^{2}).

The racial makeup of the village was 96.2% White, 0.8% Asian, 0.7% African American, 0.2% Native American, 0.0% Pacific Islander, 1.0% from other races, and 1.1% from two or more races. Hispanic or Latino of any race were 5.7% of the population.

There were 8,000 households, out of which 45.2% had children under the age of 18 living with them, 69.8% were married couples living together, and 8.2% were non-families. 15.1% of all households were made up of individuals, and 5.7% had someone living alone who was 65 years of age or older. The average household size was 3.04 and the average family size was 3.41.

=== Income and poverty ===
The median income for a household in the village was $88,778 and the median income for a family was $97,752

=== Households and housing ===
The median home value in the village as August 31, 2023, is $401,997.

=== Demographic estimates ===
According to a 2011 forecast the Chicago Metropolitan Agency for Planning estimated New Lenox will have a population of 90,652 in 2030. However, due to a substantial slow down in area growth, a 2015 forecast estimates the population of New Lenox will grow to about 68,000 residents by 2040.

== Economy ==
The crossroads of I-355, Route 6, and Cedar Road was intended as the future site of two major development projects; Cedar Crossings and Spring Creek Outlets. Cedar Crossings would have been constructed at southwest corner of Cedar Road and Route 6, adjacent to Silver Cross Hospital. Cedar Crossings proposed a 970,000-square-foot retail center to be developed by the Zaremba Group. Development of Cedar Crossings was delayed due to economic reasons. Also proposed was Spring Creek Outlets. Also proposed was Spring Creek Outlets. Spring Creek Outlets would have been a 65-acre outlet mall with additions including senior housing, hotels, restaurants, medical offices, and more. This would have extended Route 6, but was delayed and cut also due to economic reasons.

However, in 2023, New Lenox announced a 100-acre sports complex opening in June 2025 in the original proposed Cedar Crossing. This will include nine full-size baseball fields, twenty-two youth baseball/softball fields, eleven multipurpose fields, two batting cages, a playground, and a 50,000-square-foot fieldhouse. This cost $70 million for 103 acres with 50-60 million costing for the sport complex all together. There will also be ten acres sold for hotel and restaurant use across the hospital and the sport complex.

== Government ==
The village operates under the village form of local government. The Council-Trustees/Mayor form of government is used, with a village administrator performing chief administrative duties. The current mayor is Tim Baldermann and the current village administrator is Kurt Carroll. The six member board of trustees and mayor are elected in an election at large on a four-year staggered basis, with the mayor elected to that specific office by the voters.

The village's board of trustees is responsible for setting village policy, enacting ordinances and resolutions for the proper governing of the village, as well as for overseeing the proper planning of the village.

The current board is composed of Katie Christopherson, Amy Gugiliuzza, Keith Madsen, Lindsay Scalise, Bryan Reise, and Jim Wilson.

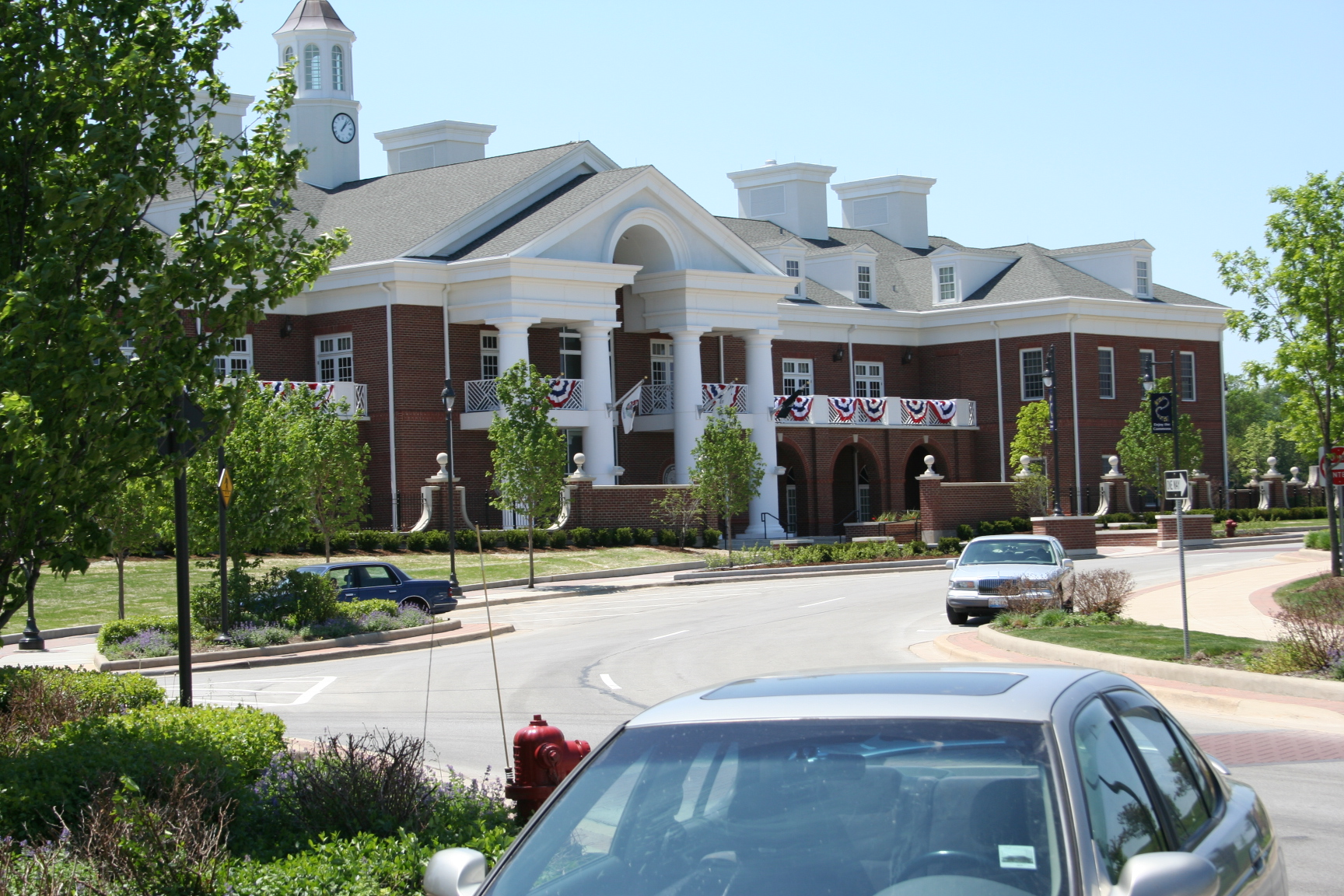
The New Lenox Village Hall

The village clerk is an appointed position and is responsible for the proper keeping of all official documents of the village. As well, the position is the local election official, and is responsible for in-person absentee voting, as well as the duties of setting the ballot for all local elections. As chief administrative officer, the village administrator is responsible for the enforcement of all village codes and ordinances, as well as recommending employee hiring to the mayor and board of trustees. The village administrator also supervises all village departmental operations.

In 2007, the village governmental operations were moved to the new New Lenox Village Hall at 1 Veterans Parkway. Upon occupying this new building of approximately 65,000 square feet (6,000 m^{2}), the old Village Hall which was approximately 14,000 square feet (1,300 m^{2}) was taken over by the New Lenox Police Department. The main level of the building which formerly housed the village operations was remodeled for police use. In 2014, a new building would open as the official Police Station in the Commons moving the police use away from the Village Hall.

== Culture ==
In 2005, the village opened the Commons anchored by the Performing Arts Pavilion. The village organizes a Summer Performing Arts Program including a series of free concerts and family movie nights. Each year the village hosts the Triple Play Concert Series featuring national recording artists performing on three different dates each summer. In 2024 it was announced that the Triple Play Concert would be rebranded to the Summer Concert Series as the mayor said it would have more notable artists perform and more concerts occurring throughout the summer.

The New Lenox French Market made its debut in 2011. The Market ran late spring through October. Due to lack of attendance, it permanently stopped after the 2015 season. The market made a comeback in 2025, running on Thursdays from early May to mid-September.

New Lenox hosts multiple festivals, including Cruise the Commons, Christmas in the Commons, Fridays After Five, and the Loyalty Day Parade.

The now disbanded Lincoln-Way Patriots were part of the Mid States Football League and played throughout the Lincoln-Way area.

== Parks ==
The New Lenox Community Park District maintains 40 parks and athletic fields comprising nearly 600 acres; while also utilizing 14 facilities throughout New Lenox.

New Lenox also offers a number of paved asphalt and crushed gravel trails. Old Plank Road Trail is a 22-mile pavement hiking and biking nature trail that travels through the heart of New Lenox with many access points to include access at the Village Hall in the Commons. The Hickory Creek State Nature Preserve provides a 2.8-mile asphalt hiking and biking nature trail as well as access to the historic one-room Schmuhl School Museum on the southeast corner of Route 30 and Schoolhouse Road, which is owned and operated by the New Lenox Historical Society. Additionally, the Hadley Valley Preserve offers a unique 4.85-mile crushed Spring Creek Greenway Trail that welcomes pedestrians and equestrians.

== Infrastructure ==
=== Health care ===
Silver Cross has built a $400 million hospital just off of U.S. Route 6 nearby the new I-355 extension in New Lenox; replacing their Joliet location on February 26, 2012. The replacement hospital brings services from Children’s Memorial Hospital, the Rehabilitation Institute of Chicago (RIC) – the #1 Rehabilitation Hospital in the Nation, and the University of Chicago Medical Center.

=== Train ===
New Lenox has two Metra commuter rail lines. The New Lenox Metra Station is located on the corner of U.S. Route 30 and Cedar Road, servicing towns on Metra's Rock Island District Line between Joliet Union Station and Chicago's LaSalle Street Station. New Lenox also has Metra Laraway Road Station at the intersection of Cedar Road. This rail line services towns on Metra's SouthWest Service Line between Manhattan and Chicago's Union Station.

=== Highways ===
New Lenox is located at the junctions of many major roads. U.S. Route 30 is the main East to West road through town. The major north–south streets are Cedar Road, Gougar Road, and Nelson Road. I-80 and I-355, also known as the Veterans Memorial Tollway, pass through New Lenox. These expressways provide transportation to many other major highways and to Chicago, Joliet, Naperville, Wheaton, Bolingbrook.

== Education ==
Elementary and middle schools are operated by New Lenox School District 122 while Lincoln-Way Community High School District serves the communities of New Lenox, Frankfort, Mokena, Manhattan, and small portions of Tinley Park. There are three comprehensive high schools within the district: Lincoln-Way Central, Lincoln-Way East, and Lincoln-Way West. Lincoln-Way Central and Lincoln-Way West are located in New Lenox; Lincoln-Way East is located in Frankfort.

Providence Catholic High School is a private Roman Catholic secondary school located in New Lenox.

== Media ==
New Lenox's weekly community newspaper was The New Lenox Patriot. Due to the COVID-19 pandemic, the company running the paper closed in April 2020. Most residents rely on the New Lenox Patch website for their news source.

== Notable people ==
- B.J. Bello, NFL linebacker for the Los Angeles Chargers
- Alex Broadhurst, former NHL center for the Columbus Blue Jackets
- Adam Calhoun, American rapper/songwriter
- Karla DeVito, singer/songwriter
- Tony Cingrani, Former MLB pitcher for the St. Louis Cardinals
- Ned Grabavoy, former MLS player and current scouting director for Portland Timbers, 2009 MLS Cup winner
- Sonya Huber, writer
- Renée Kosel, state representative representing Illinois 81st legislative district
- Rob Ninkovich, retired defensive end and two-time Super Bowl champion for the New England Patriots, analyst for ESPN
- Johan Reinhard, Andean archeologist and explorer in residence for National Geographic
- Wellington J. Reynolds, painter, instructor at Art Institute of Chicago
- Eric Steinbach, offensive lineman, retired NFL football player
- Robert Francis Prevost (Pope Leo XIV), head of the Catholic Church
