= Dan Giordano =

American gridiron football player (born 1989)

No. 48
- Position: Linebacker

Personal information
- Born: September 17, 1989 (age 37); Frankfort, Illinois
- Listed height: 6 ft 4 in (1.93 m)
- Listed weight: 260 lb (118 kg)

Career information
- High school: Frankfort (IL) Lincoln-Way East
- College: Cincinnati
- NFL draft: 2013: undrafted

Career history
- Arizona Cardinals (2013); Hamilton Tiger-Cats (2015)*
- * Offseason or practice squad member only

Awards and highlights
- First-team All-Big East (2012)
- Stats at Pro Football Reference

Daniel James Giordano (born September 17, 1989) is an American former football linebacker. He played college football at the University of Cincinnati.

== Professional career ==
=== Arizona Cardinals ===
On April 27, 2013, he signed with the Arizona Cardinals as an undrafted free agent. Giordano spent his entire rookie season on the Physically unable to perform list, after he signed as a rookie free agent out of Cincinnati. Giordano was released by the Cardinals in April 2014.

=== Hamilton Tiger-Cats ===
Giordano signed with the Hamilton Tiger-Cats in March 2015 and retired in May 2015.
