= LWW =

LWW may refer to:

- The Lion, the Witch and the Wardrobe, a fantasy novel by C.S. Lewis
- Lippincott Williams & Wilkins, an academic and professional medical publisher
- Lincoln-Way West High School, a high school in New Lenox, Illinois
