= Adam Gettis =

American football player (born 1988)

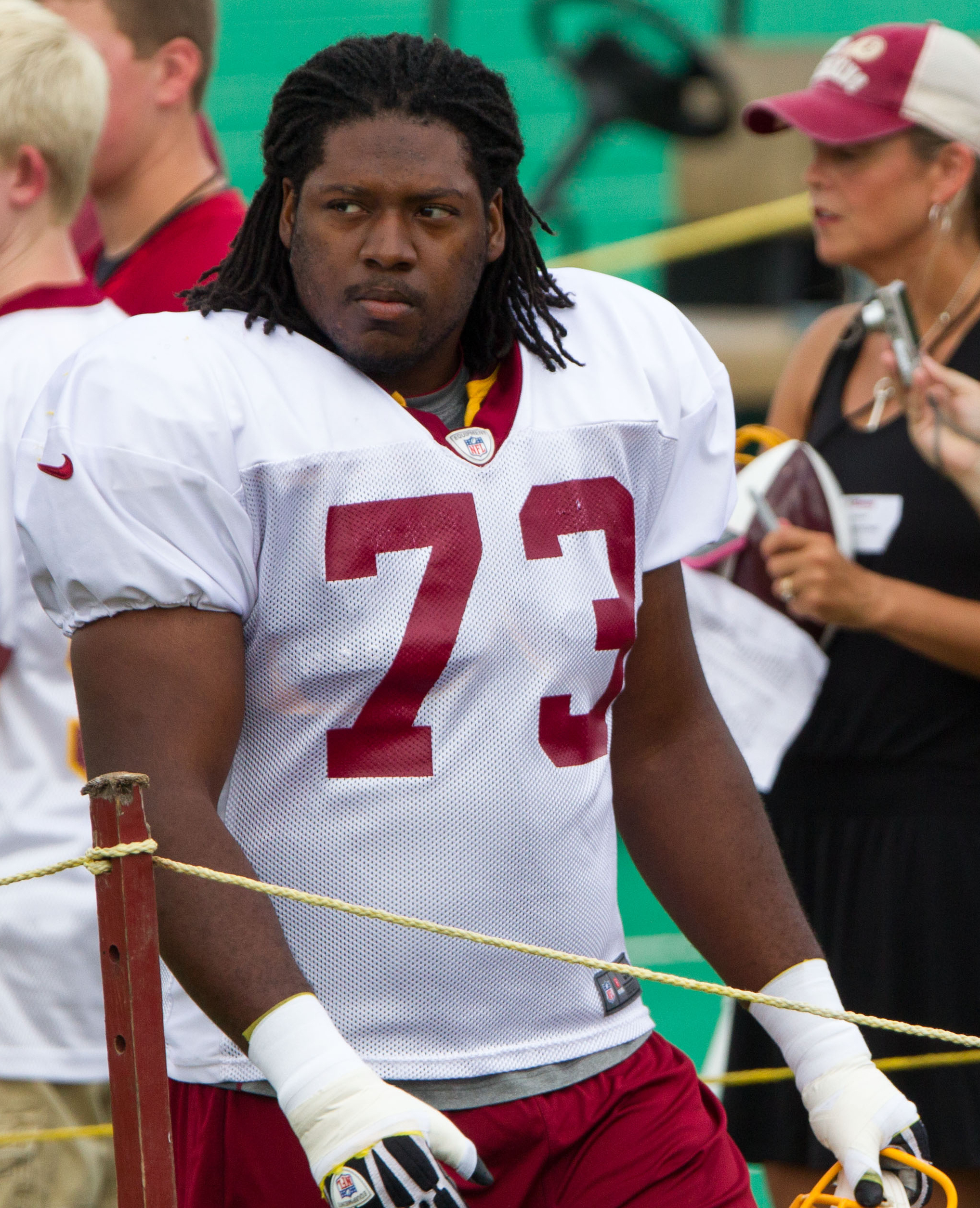
- Gettis with the Washington Redskins in 2012

No. 73, 60
- Position: Guard

Personal information
- Born: December 9, 1988 (age 37); Frankfort, Illinois, U.S.
- Listed height: 6 ft 2 in (1.88 m)
- Listed weight: 305 lb (138 kg)

Career information
- High school: Lincoln-Way East (Frankfort)
- College: Iowa (2007–2011)
- NFL draft: 2012: 5th round, 141st overall pick

Career history
- Washington Redskins (2012−2013); Pittsburgh Steelers (2014)*; New York Giants (2014−2015); Oakland Raiders (2015)*; New York Giants (2015–2017); Tampa Bay Buccaneers (2017–2018); Atlanta Falcons (2019)*
- * Offseason or practice squad member only

Awards and highlights
- Second-team All-Big Ten (2011)

Career NFL statistics
- Games played: 17
- Games started: 1
- Stats at Pro Football Reference

Adam Gettis (born December 9, 1988) is an American former professional football player who was a guard in the National Football League (NFL). He played college football for the Iowa Hawkeyes and was selected by the Washington Redskins in the fifth round of the 2012 NFL draft.

== Early life ==
From 2004 to 2006, Gettis played high school football for the Lincoln-Way East Griffins as a starter. In 2005, Gettis and the Griffins went on to win the Class 8A State Championship in Illinois.

== Professional career ==
Pre-draft measurables
| Height | Weight | Arm length | Hand span | 40-yard dash | 20-yard shuttle | Three-cone drill | Vertical jump |
|---|---|---|---|---|---|---|---|
| 6 ft 2 in (1.88 m) | 293 lb (133 kg) | 33 1/8 | 9 1/2 in (0.24 m) | 5.00 s | 4.65 s | 7.99 s | 31.5 in (0.80 m) |
All values from NFL Combine

=== Washington Redskins ===
Gettis was selected in the fifth round (141st overall) of the 2012 NFL draft by the Washington Redskins. He was officially signed by the Redskins to a four-year contract on May 5, 2012. After performing well in the preseason, even starting at the right guard position for the injured Chris Chester for the first two preseason games. He made the final 53-man roster by the start of the 2012 season, and made his NFL debut in Week 3 of the 2013 season against the Detroit Lions.

Gettis was waived on August 24, 2014.

=== Pittsburgh Steelers ===
Gettis was signed to the practice squad of the Pittsburgh Steelers on October 14, 2014.

=== New York Giants (first stint) ===
Gettis was signed from the practice squad of the Steelers to the active roster of the New York Giants on December 16, 2014. On September 5, 2015, he was waived by the Giants. On September 6, 2015, he was signed to the Giants' practice squad. On October 15, 2015, Gettis was released by the Giants. On October 21, 2015, he was re-signed to the practice squad. On November 4, 2015, Gettis was released by the Giants.

=== Oakland Raiders ===
On November 17, 2015, Gettis was signed to the Oakland Raiders' practice squad.

=== New York Giants (second stint) ===
On December 1, 2015, Gettis re-signed with the Giants. On September 3, 2016, he was released by the Giants and was signed to the practice squad the next day. He was promoted to the active roster on November 9, 2016. He was waived by the Giants on December 10, 2016, and was re-signed to the practice squad.

Gettis signed a reserve/future contract with the Giants on January 12, 2017. On August 28, 2017, Gettis was placed on injured reserve. He was released with a settlement on November 16, 2017.

=== Tampa Bay Buccaneers ===
On December 20, 2017, Gettis signed with the Tampa Bay Buccaneers. On March 26, 2018, Gettis re-signed with the Buccaneers. On September 11, 2018, Gettis was released by the Buccaneers.

=== Atlanta Falcons ===
On April 3, 2019, Gettis signed with the Atlanta Falcons. He was released on August 31, 2019.

== Personal life ==
Gettis is the cousin of wide receiver David Gettis, who was drafted in sixth round of the 2010 NFL draft by the Carolina Panthers.

He married Dionna Taylor in 2014, in Chicago, Illinois.
