= Liberty Junior High School =

Liberty Junior High School may refer to:

- Liberty Junior High School, in the New Lenox School District 122, New Lenox, Illinois
- Liberty Junior High School, in the Richardson Independent School District, Dallas, Texas
- Liberty Junior High School, in the Bethel School District, Spanaway, Washington
