= Casey Paus =

American football player

Profile
- Position: Quarterback

Personal information
- Born: March 27, 1983 (age 43); New Lenox, Illinois, U.S.
- Listed height: 6 ft 5 in (1.96 m)
- Listed weight: 225 lb (102 kg)

Career information
- High school: New Lenox (IL) Lincoln Way
- College: Washington
- NFL draft: 2006: undrafted

Casey Paus (born March 27, 1983) is an American former football quarterback. He played college football for the Washington Huskies football team from 2001 to 2005. Paus started 8 of 11 games in the 2004 season, throwing for 1,476 yards, 5 touchdowns, and 17 interceptions.

== Early life ==
Born the son of Nancy and Rick Paus, Casey prepped at Lincoln-Way High School, where he participated as a member of the football team, leading his team to a 12–1 record and a No. 3 state ranking in his senior year. Paus posted a 42–2 career record and finished career with 5,734 yards passing and 51 TDs. Paus was ranked sixth in the nation at QB by Rivals.com.

== College career ==
Starting in 2004, Paus competed for the starting quarterback job against Isaiah Stanback and Carl Bonell, after the departure of Cody Pickett who had started at QB for the huskies during the previous 3 seasons before entering the NFL draft. Paus had mixed success and was replaced at times throughout the season in favor of Stanback or Bonnell.

Pre-draft measurables
Height	Weight
6 ft 5 in (1.96 m)	225 lb (102 kg)
Values from Pro Day

== Hockey career ==
Casey is an amateur hockey player who competes in the CAHL for the team Top Shelf. Playing as a defenseman, he played a crucial role in his team's success, contributing to their victory in the 2024 CAHL Championship despite his late penalty in the game. Casey also played a big part of winning the 2024 CAHL crosstown championship. Known for his strong defensive skills and leadership on the ice, he has become a key figure in the league, helping Top Shelf secure their title in a highly competitive season.
