= A. J. Henning =

American football player (born 2001)

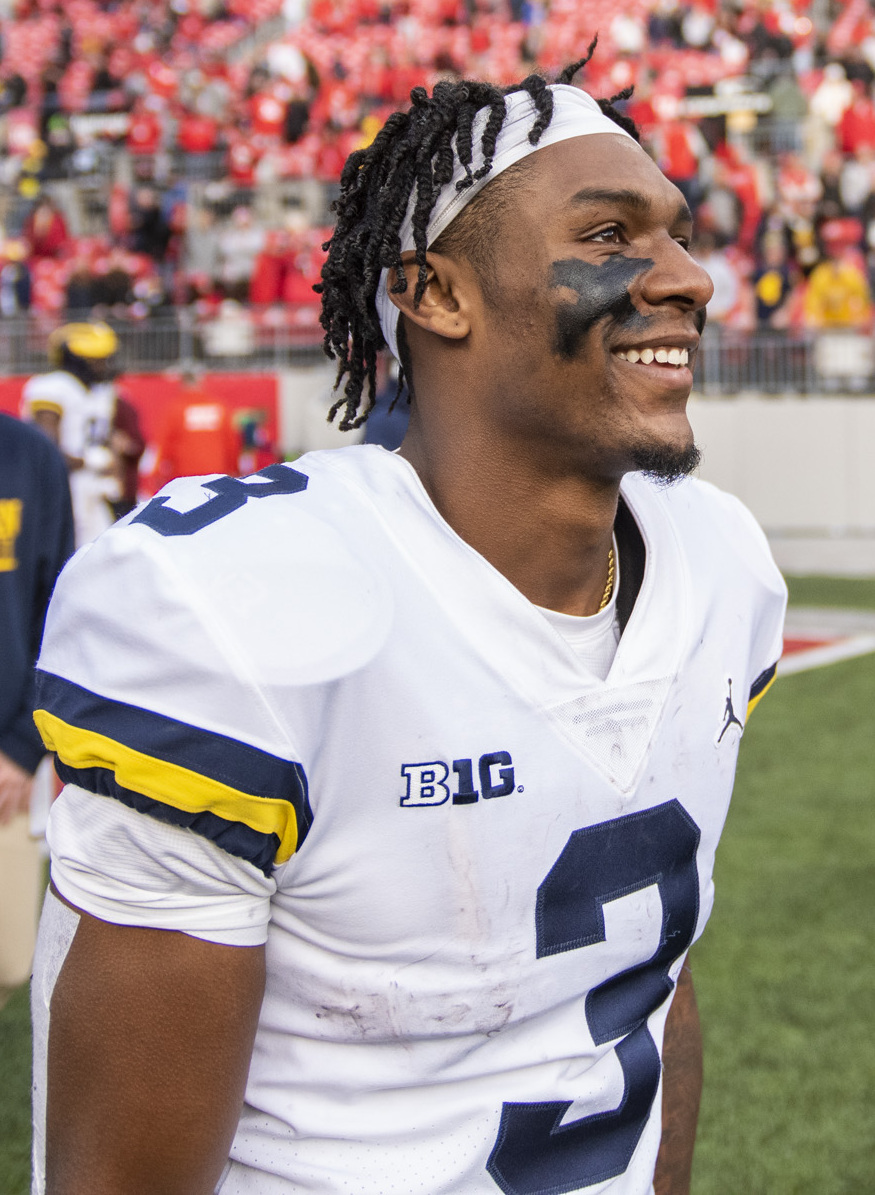
- Henning with the Michigan Wolverines in 2022

No. 82 – Miami Dolphins
- Position: Wide receiver
- Roster status: Practice squad

Personal information
- Born: September 9, 2001 (age 25); Frankfort, Illinois, U.S.
- Listed height: 5 ft 10 in (1.78 m)
- Listed weight: 190 lb (86 kg)

Career information
- High school: Lincoln-Way East (Frankfort, Illinois)
- College: Michigan (2020–2022); Northwestern (2023–2024)
- NFL draft: 2025: undrafted

Career history
- Miami Dolphins (2025–present)*
- * Offseason or practice squad member only

Awards and highlights
- Second-team All-Big Ten (2022); Third-team All-Big Ten (2021)
- Stats at Pro Football Reference

Antiwan Henning Jr. (born September 9, 2001) is an American professional football wide receiver for the Miami Dolphins of the National Football League (NFL). He played college football for the Michigan Wolverines and Northwestern Wildcats.

== Early life ==
Henning attended Lincoln-Way East High School in Frankfort, Illinois. During the 2019 season, he tallied 835 receiving yards and 648 rushing yards, scored 29 touchdowns, and was selected as the Gatorade Player of the Year in Illinois. 247Sports rated him as the No. 1 prospect in Illinois.

== College career ==
=== Michigan ===
Henning committed to Michigan and was the school's highest-ranked recruit in the 2020 class. He debuted for Michigan during the COVID-shortened 2020 season, appearing in six games.

As a sophomore in 2021, he appeared in all 14 games for Michigan, playing as a return specialist and wide receiver. Against Western Michigan on September 4, he scored his first collegiate touchdown, gaining 74 yards on a reverse. Against Maryland on November 20, he took a lateral from Michael Barrett and returned it 81 yards for a touchdown. Against Ohio State on November 27, he tallied 107 all-purpose yards and scored Michigan's first touchdown on a jet sweep. For the season, he averaged 9.4 yards on 29 punt returns. He was also named to the 2021 Academic All-Big Ten team.

In the spring of 2022, Michigan coach Jim Harbaugh said they planned to use Henning in a Deebo Samuel-esque role. In July 2022, Pro Football Focus rated Henning as one of its 31 breakout candidates for 2022.

On September 17, Henning returned a punt 61 yards for a touchdown against UConn. It was Michigan's first punt return for touchdown since 2019. Having returned a kickoff for a touchdown in 2021, he became the fourth Michigan player (joining Steve Breaston, Desmond Howard, and Dave Raimey) to return both a punt and a kickoff for a touchdown. During the 2022 regular season, Henning returned 25 punts for 184 yards, an average of 7.36 yard per return. He also returned eight kickoffs for 163 yards, an average of 20.38 yards per return.

=== Northwestern ===
On April 24, 2023, Henning announced that he entered the NCAA transfer portal, eventually transferring to Northwestern for his final two seasons.

== Professional career ==
Pre-draft measurables
Height	Weight	Arm length	Hand span	Wingspan	40-yard dash	10-yard split	20-yard split	20-yard shuttle	Three-cone drill	Vertical jump	Broad jump	Bench press
5 ft 9 1/2 in (1.77 m)	188 lb (85 kg)	30 3/4 in (0.78 m)	8 1/2 in (0.22 m)	6 ft 1 1/2 in (1.87 m)	4.50 s	1.58 s	2.65 s	4.07 s	6.80 s	34.5 in (0.88 m)	10 ft 3 in (3.12 m)	16 reps
All values from Pro Day

On May 9, 2025, Henning signed with the Miami Dolphins as an undrafted free agent after going unselected in the 2025 NFL draft. He was waived on August 26 as part of final roster cuts and re-signed to the practice squad the next day. On December 4, Henning was suspended by the NFL after violating the league's policy on performance-enhancing substances.

Henning signed a reserve/future contract with Miami on January 6, 2026. He was waived by the Dolphins on August 31. On September 24, he was signed to the practice squad.
