= Kevin Lynch (computing) =

American software developer

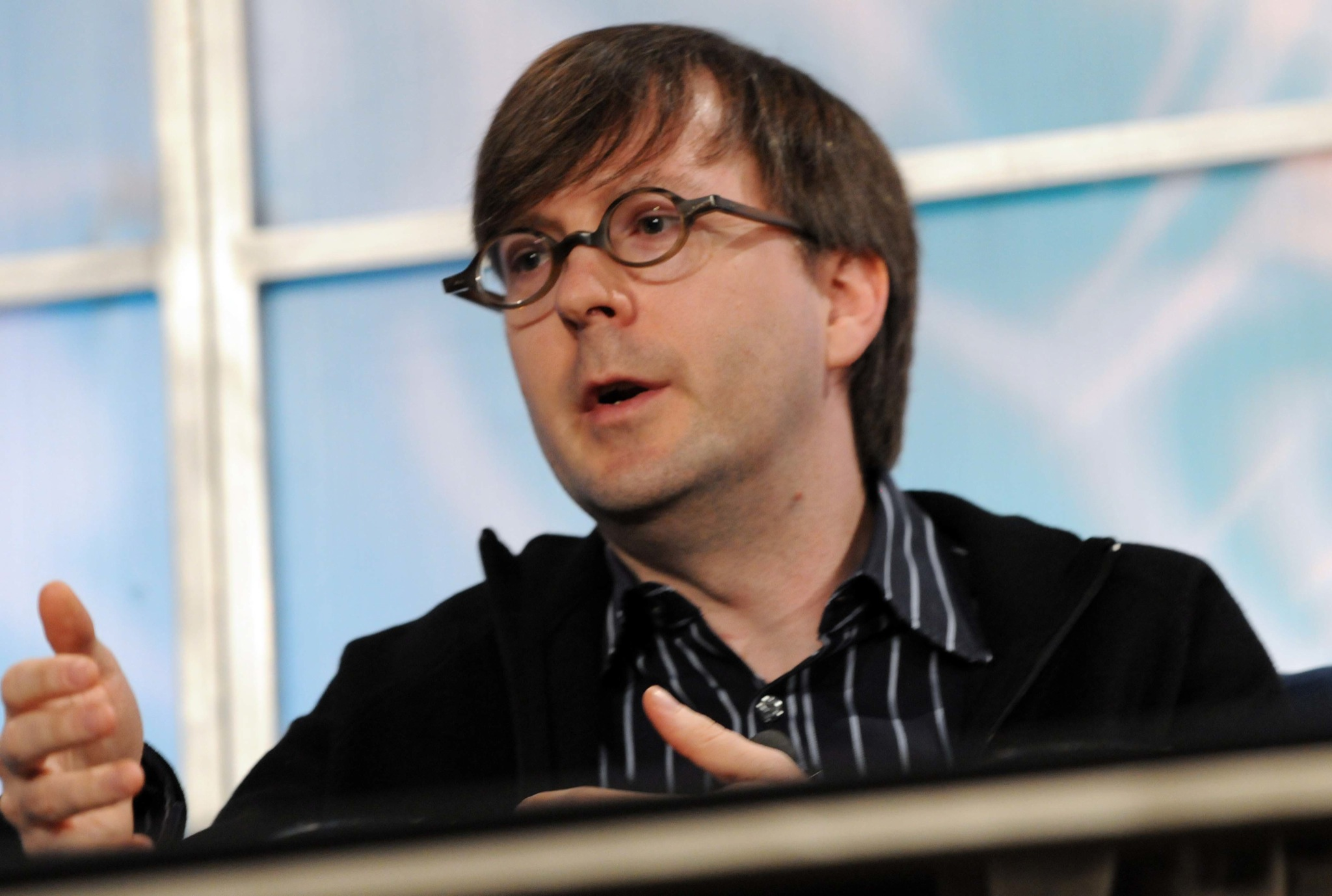
Kevin Lynch in 2008

Kevin M. Lynch is an American software developer. He is currently the vice president of technology at Apple Inc., joining in 2013 after working as the chief technology officer of Adobe Systems. Lynch has been responsible for developing the software of Apple's smartwatch project, the Apple Watch, a device he demonstrated at the September 2014 Apple Launch Event.

== Education ==
Lynch graduated from Lincoln-Way Central High School in New Lenox, Illinois. He attended the University of Illinois at Chicago (UIC) College of Engineering as an undergraduate student, where he studied computer science and interactive computer graphics and worked in the UIC College of Engineering's Electronic Visualization Laboratory.

== Career ==
Lynch helped start one of the first Mac software startups called Mac3D—the first Mac 2D/3D drawing application. He also created innovative desktop publishing software that combined drawing and page layout, word processing, the first editable property inspectors in the GUI, and a controllable page layout pane.

Early in his career, Lynch worked at Frame Technology, General Magic, and Macromedia. He helped develop General Magic's personal digital assistant in the early 1990s, widely recognized as the precursor to the modern smartphone. At Macromedia, Lynch led the Dreamweaver HTML authoring tool and introduced Flash to enable multimedia on the web, eventually reaching over 1 billion people.

In 2005, Lynch became chief software architect at Adobe Systems after being involved in the company's $3.4 billion acquisition of Macromedia. He helped integrate the companies and develop new technology including a cross-OS application runtime called AIR, which enables an app to run across iOS, Android, Mac and Windows. In 2008, he was promoted to chief technology officer, where he helped transform the company through the advancement of mobile, social and cloud technology.

During his time at Adobe, Lynch was a staunch advocate of Flash—Adobe's multimedia software platform—and had highly visible debates with Apple CEO Steve Jobs for hindering the use of Flash on its mobile devices, the iPhone and iPad. Later, Jobs tried to recruit Lynch to Apple.

== Honorary doctorate ==
In 2017, Lynch was awarded an honorary Doctor of Engineering degree by UIC for his work in software development. He is one of only two individuals who has received this distinction in the UIC College of Engineering's 50+ year history. The other recipient is Richard Hill, former CEO of Novellus Systems.

In a letter supporting Lynch's nomination for the honorary Doctor of Engineering degree, Apple's Chief Operating Officer Jeff Williams stated: “Truly brilliant technical minds exist. Truly amazing leaders exist. The intersection of the two isn’t seen very often.”
