= Isaiah Stanback =

American football player (born 1984)

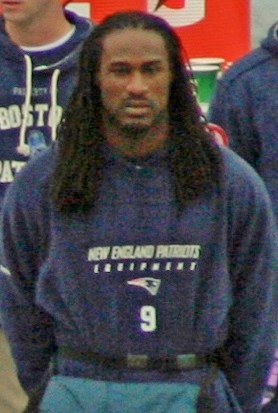
- Stanback with the New England Patriots in 2009

No. 9, 86
- Position: Wide receiver

Personal information
- Born: August 16, 1984 (age 42); Seattle, Washington, U.S.
- Listed height: 6 ft 2 in (1.88 m)
- Listed weight: 228 lb (103 kg)

Career information
- High school: Garfield (Seattle)
- College: Washington
- NFL draft: 2007: 4th round, 103rd overall pick

Career history
- Dallas Cowboys (2007–2008); New England Patriots (2009); Seattle Seahawks (2010); New York Giants (2011–2012)*; Jacksonville Jaguars (2012)
- * Offseason or practice squad member only

Awards and highlights
- Super Bowl champion (XLVI)

Career NFL statistics
- Games played: 22
- Receptions: 6
- Receiving yards: 52
- Return yards: 318
- Stats at Pro Football Reference

Isaiah Ramon Stanback (born August 16, 1984) is an American former professional football player who was a wide receiver in the National Football League (NFL). He played college football as a quarterback for the Washington Huskies. He was selected by the Dallas Cowboys in the fourth round of the 2007 NFL draft. He played in the NFL for the Cowboys, New England Patriots, and Jacksonville Jaguars.

== Early life ==
Stanback attended Garfield High School in Seattle, Washington, where he played football, basketball, and baseball.

=== Junior (2000) ===
As a junior, he tallied 1,653 passing yards and 13 touchdowns. He was selected as one of just three "blue chip" players by the Seattle Times.

=== Senior (2001) ===
Stanback passed for 1,628 yards (second among Washington state Class 4A quarterbacks) and 12 touchdowns, and added 700 rushing yards and nine rushing touchdowns in 2001 for 2-7 Garfield High School. His passing total ranked second among Washington state Class 4A quarterbacks. He had his best game of 2001 against Inglemoor High School, totaling 399 yards passing and three touchdowns. He was an all-KingCo Conference pick again, in 2001. He was the first "blue chip" quarterback since 1998.

He was one of eight Tacoma News-Tribune "Northwest Nuggets". He was a member of the Tacoma News-Tribune's "Western 100". He was an all-KingCo Conference pick. Stanback earned PrepStar and SuperPrep All-American honors. He was a member of PrepStar's Top 125 Dream Team. He was also, the fifth-rated quarterback in the nation according to SuperPrep. Stanback was the ranked the #23 player nationally in SuperPrep's "Elite 50". He was the #1 player in SuperPrep's Washington 22. He rated 14th among all quarterbacks nationally, fourth in the West Region, by PrepStar. Stanback was also listed by PrepStar as one of the top-three run-pass combination quarterbacks in the nation. He was one of the nation's Top 101 recruits according to Student Sports Magazine. He was also, considered the third-best "athlete" on the West Coast by PacWest Football. He was rated #23 nationally among prep quarterbacks by Tom Lemming's Prep Football Report. He also played on the baseball team.

== College career ==
Following high school, Stanback accepted a football scholarship from the University of Washington.

=== Redshirt freshman season ===
In 2002, Stanback was redshirted for the season. During the 2003 spring game he went 4-of-9 for 82 yards and a touchdown.

=== Freshman season ===
In 2003, Stanback played in 11 games, mostly as a wide receiver. He also returned kicks and practiced with the quarterbacks. He was 2-for-2 passing during the season. Stanback's quarterback duties were limited to late-game situations versus Indiana and Idaho. On the season Stanback caught ten passes for 143 yards, leading the team with a 14.3 average per reception. He had four catches for 82 yards vs. Arizona, including a career-long 41-yarder. He also rushed for a total of 25 yards from the quarterback position. He also returned eight kickoffs, averaging 16.6 yards per return. He returned seven kickoffs against California, tying the school single-game record for returns in a game.

=== Sophomore season ===
In 2004, in the seventh game against number one ranked USC, he became just the second African-American to start at quarterback for the University of Washington (Warren Moon was the first one). He played in five games at quarterback against Fresno State, Oregon State, USC, Arizona and Washington State.

He was second on the team behind Casey Paus with 389 passing yards. He scored his first career rushing touchdown in the season opener against Fresno State. He registered 11-of-29 for 219 yards, two touchdowns and one interception in just three quarters of action against Oregon State, also leading the team with 51 yards rushing. He averaged 19.9 yards per completion against Oregon State (fifth in school history).

He finished the year on a high note, coming off the bench to complete five of eight passes for 100 yards in the Apple Cup against Washington State, including connecting with Craig Chambers for a 39-yard scoring play and rushing for one touchdown.

He ran track during the winter of 2004, qualifying for the indoor conference championships in the 60-meter dash.

=== Junior season ===
In 2005, Stanback started all 11 games at quarterback. On the season his recorded 2,136 yards were the 15th most in school history. He averaged 194.2 passing yards per game, 11th-most ever in school history. He also ran for 353 yards on 100 carries, with five touchdowns. He entered the school's all-time top-ten in total offense (2,489 yards, tenth), and total offense per game (226.3, eighth). Stanback was named the Sports Radio 950 KJR Most Outstanding Offensive Player at the team's postseason banquet.

Stanback led the Huskies to win at Arizona, completing 10-of-19 for 157 yards and one touchdown, along with a career-high 96 rushing yards and two rushing touchdowns. He completed a career-long 69-yard touchdown pass to Craig Chambers on a Hail Mary pass as the first half expired in Arizona, sparking the Washington win. He also, had a good day vs. #1 USC, completing 14-of-18 passes for 201 yards and a touchdown, while also scoring on a run. He completed 19-of-27 passes for 242 yards against Air Force, with no interceptions and one touchdown. He surpassed the 300-yard passing mark twice, vs. Cal (301) and Notre Dame (with a career-high 353). His passing total at Notre Dame was the 14th-most ever at Washington. He also set a career-high for attempts (40) vs. Notre Dame.

Stanback then ran track for Washington in the spring. He placed fifth in the finals of the 100-meter dash at the Pac-10 Championships. He was sixth at the West Regional meet at Brigham Young University, missing an NCAA Championships berth by just .02 seconds. He ranks among Washington's all-time top-ten in the 100-meter dash (10.48, eighth) and 4x100-meter relay (40.07, seventh) outdoors, and the 60-meter dash (6.80, eighth) indoors. His 100-meter best ranks third all-time among Washington football players who have competed in track (Ja'Warren Hooker, 10.18; Sterling Hinds, 10.27).

=== Senior season ===
In 2006, Stanback opened the season with solid game vs. San Jose State, passing 16-for-25 for 168 yards, one touchdown, one interception, while rushing for 102 yards and a touchdown on 17 carries. He set new career highs for carries and rushing yards against. San Jose. In the game at Oklahoma Stanback was 9-of-22, 139 yards passing. He led Huskies to a win over Fresno State going 15-of-26, 151 yards, zero interceptions, two touchdown passes, 12 carries for 91 yards and one rushing touchdown. He accounted for 248 of Washington's 249 yards of total offense vs. UCLA going 18-for-29 for 200 yards, one interception and three touchdown passes, along with 13 carries for 48 rushing yards. Stanback went 14-of-25 for 293 and two touchdowns in win at Arizona. He went 17-of-38, zero interceptions, two touchdowns, and 212 yards at USC. Stanback injured foot in a loss to Oregon State (12-of-24, 162 yards; 11 carries, 11 yards, two rushing touchdowns). He had season-ending foot surgery October 17 on his badly sprained right foot.

He ended up ranked in numerous school career and single-season statistical categories: second in career passing yards per completion with 14.38; third in career rushing yards by a quarterback with 794; fourth in career yards of total offense per game with 6.16; sixth in career passing yards per attempt with 7.40; sixth in career rushing attempts by a quarterback with 234; tenth in career total offense with 4,662 yards; eleventh in career passing with 3,868 yards; eleventh in career attempts with 523; 12th in career completions with 269; 14th in career touchdown passes with 22.

=== Baseball ===
In 2006, Stanback was drafted by the Baltimore Orioles in the 2006 MLB June Draft despite not playing baseball in college. He turned down the offer so he could play football.

== Professional career ==
Pre-draft measurables
Height	Weight	Arm length	Hand span	Bench press
6 ft 2 3/8 in (1.89 m)	216 lb (98 kg)	33 in (0.84 m)	9 1/4 in (0.23 m)	22 reps
All values from NFL Combine

=== Dallas Cowboys ===
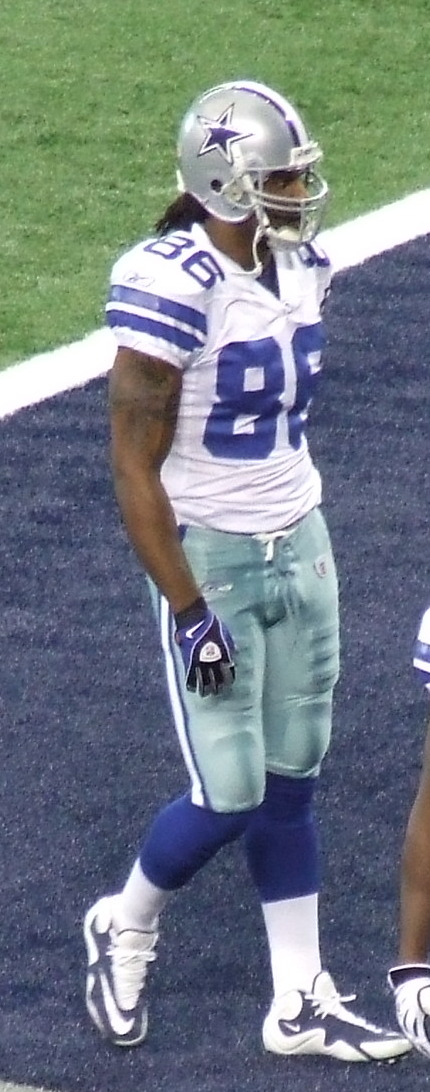
Stanback began his NFL career with the Dallas Cowboys.

Stanback was selected by the Dallas Cowboys in the fourth round (103rd overall) in the 2007 NFL draft. Despite playing mostly as a quarterback in college, he was drafted with the intention of being converted into a wide receiver. He was active for two games in his rookie season, but did not record any receptions.

In 2008, he was active for eight games, catching two passes for 24 yards in the opener against the New York Giants. On December 26, he was placed on injured reserve with a shoulder injury. On September 5, 2009, he was waived after being passed on the depth chart by undrafted rookie Kevin Ogletree and struggling with injuries during his time with the team.

=== New England Patriots ===
On September 6, 2009, Stanback was signed to the practice squad of the New England Patriots as a quarterback. On November 14, he was promoted to the active roster, when the Patriots placed rookie wide receiver Brandon Tate on injured reserve. He caught his first pass as a Patriot from Tom Brady the next day, in the Patriots' Week 10 game against the Indianapolis Colts.

He was active for six of the Patriots' final eight games of the season, finishing with three receptions for 22 yards. He also returned one kickoff for 22 yards. He was waived on May 27, 2010.

=== Seattle Seahawks ===
On June 1, 2010, Stanback was claimed off waivers by the Seattle Seahawks. On August 7, he tore his left Achilles tendon during practice. On August 8, he was waived injured and placed on injured reserve. On September 3, 2011, he was placed on injured reserve again, and released with an injury settlement on October 8.

=== New York Giants ===
On November 29, 2011, he was signed to the New York Giants' practice squad as a wide receiver. He would remain there as the team went on to win Super Bowl XLVI. He was waived on August 31, 2012.

=== Jacksonville Jaguars ===
On December 4, 2012, he was signed to the Jacksonville Jaguars' practice squad and converted into a tight end. On December 17, he was promoted to the active roster. In 2013, he struggled with a quadriceps injury and was released on August 27.

== Career statistics ==
=== NFL ===
Year	Team	G	Receiving					Return				
Year	Team	G	Rec	Yards	Y/R	TD	LNG	KR	Yards	Y/R	TD	LNG
2007	Dallas Cowboys	2	0	0	0.0	0	0	3	78	26.0	0	0
2008	Dallas Cowboys	8	2	24	12.0	0	15	10	218	21.8	0	58
2009	New England Patriots	2	3	22	7.3	0	9	–	–	–	–	–
Total		12	5	46	9.2	0	15	13	296	22.8	0	58

=== College ===
Year	Team	GP	GS	Passing											Rushing				Receiving					Return									
Year	Team	GP	GS	Comp	Att	Comp %	Yards	YPA	TD	INT	LNG	QB Rating	Att	Yards	Avg	TD	Rec	Yards	Y/R	TD	LNG	KR	Yards	Y/R	FC	TD	LNG	PR	Yards	Y/R	FC	TD	LNG
2002	Washington Huskies	0	0	0	00.0	0	0	0	0	0	0	0.0	0	0	0	0	0	0	0	00.0	0	0	0	0	00.0	0	0	0	0	0	0	0	0
2003	Washington Huskies	11	0	2	2	100.0	18	9.0	0	0	7	175.6	8	25	3.1	0	10	143	14.3	0	41	8	133	16.6	0	0	87	0	0	0	0	0	0
2004	Washington Huskies	7	1	23	68	33.8	389	5.7	3	3	26	87.6	41	66	1.6	2	1	3	3.0	0	3	0	0	00.0	0	0	0	0	0	0	0	0	0
2005	Washington Huskies	11	11	143	264	54.2	2,136	8.1	9	6	69	128.8	100	353	3.5	5	1	0	00.0	0	0	0	0	00.0	0	0	0	0	0	0	0	0	0
2006	Washington Huskies	8	8	101	189	53.4	1,325	7.0	10	3	36	122.9	85	350	4.1	4	0	0	00.0	0	0	0	0	00.0	0	0	0	0	0	0	0	0	0
Total		37	20	269	523	51.4	3,868	7.4	22	12	36	122.85	234	794	3.4	11	12	146	12.2	0	41	8	133	21.7	0	0	87	0	0	0.0	0	0	0

== Personal life ==
Stanback was a part of the WWE Performance Center at Full Sail University in Florida, training to become a wrestler. He made an appearance on Netflix's Ultimate Beastmaster Season 1 as a contestant for Team America, failing the second obstacle in the first round, which resulted in him placing last.

Stanback and his wife’s oldest daughter was diagnosed with type 1 diabetes in April 2015 at the age of three. Over the ensuing years, the family has been active in type 1 diabetes education.
