= B. J. Bello =

American football player (born 1994)

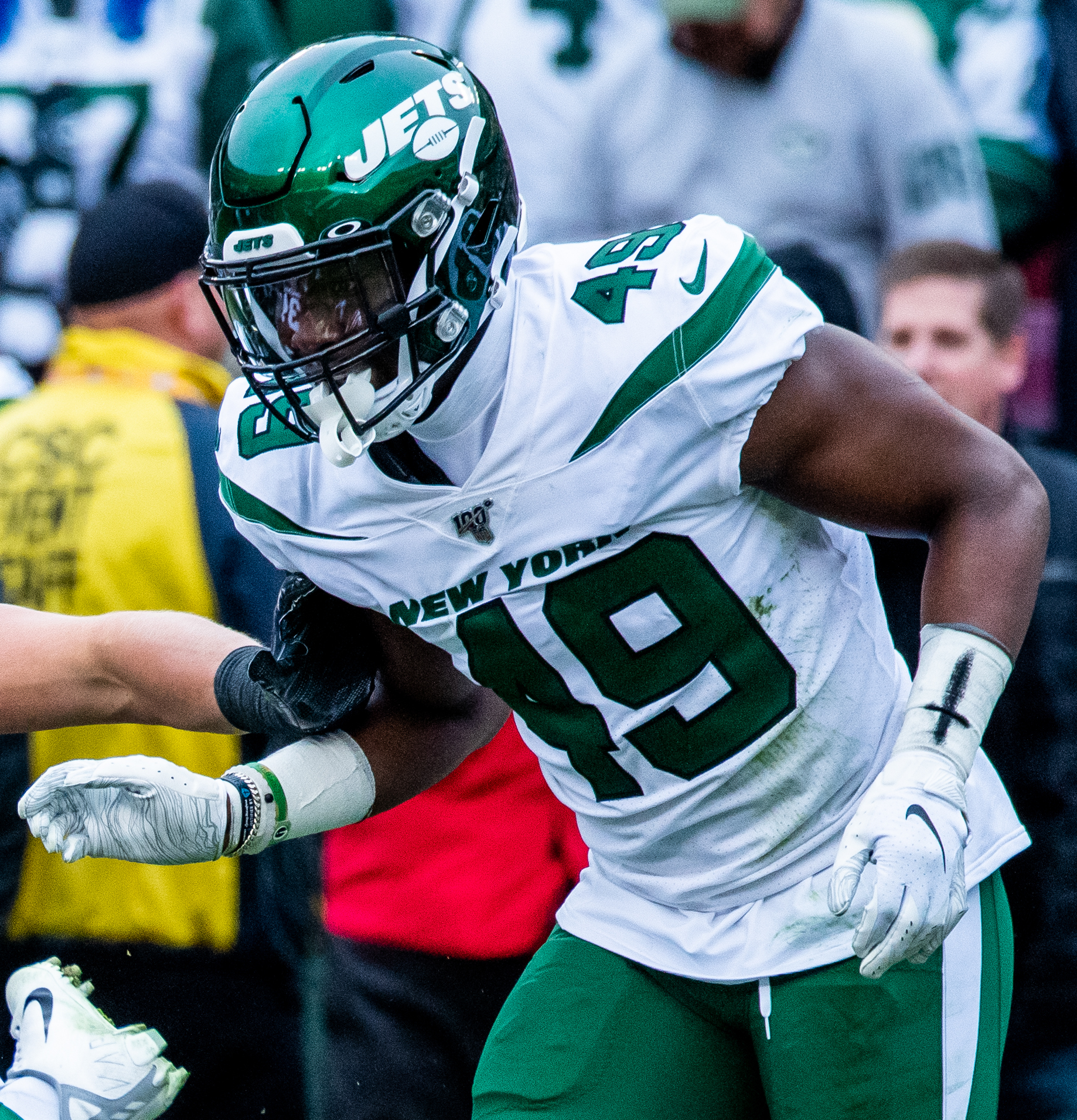
- Bello with the New York Jets in 2019

No. 49
- Position: Linebacker

Personal information
- Born: October 31, 1994 (age 32); New Lenox, Illinois, U.S.
- Listed height: 6 ft 3 in (1.91 m)
- Listed weight: 229 lb (104 kg)

Career information
- High school: Lincoln-Way West (New Lenox)
- College: Illinois; Illinois State
- NFL draft: 2017: undrafted

Career history
- Cleveland Browns (2017); Arizona Cardinals (2018)*; Philadelphia Eagles (2018); Houston Texans (2019)*; Green Bay Packers (2019)*; New York Jets (2019); Los Angeles Chargers (2020); Tennessee Titans (2021); Philadelphia Stars (2023); Arlington Renegades (2024)*
- * Offseason or practice squad member only

Career NFL statistics
- Total tackles: 20
- Stats at Pro Football Reference

Amin Babajide "B. J." Bello (born October 31, 1994) is an American former professional football player who was a linebacker in the National Football League (NFL). He played college football for the Illinois Fighting Illini and Illinois State Redbirds.

== Early life ==
B. J. Bello was born on October 31, 1994, in New Lenox, Illinois. He played high school football at Lincoln-Way West High School in New Lenox, Illinois. He recorded 81 tackles, 1 forced fumble and 1 interception his senior year in 2011. He also participated in track and field at Lincoln-Way West, earning All-State honors.

== College career ==
Bello played for the Illinois Fighting Illini of the University of Illinois at Urbana–Champaign from 2013 to 2015. He was redshirted in 2012. He played in four games in 2013 and recorded four tackle assists. He played in nine games in 2014 and totaled three tackle assists. Bello played in eight games in 2015, recording one solo tackle, five tackle assists and one pass breakup. He transferred to play for the Illinois State Redbirds of Illinois State University in 2016. He played in 12 games, starting 11, in 2016, totaling 72 total tackles, 6 sacks, 4 pass breakups and 2 forced fumbles. Bello was named to the MVFC All-Newcomer Team in 2016.

== Professional career ==
Bello was rated the 45th best outside linebacker in the 2017 NFL draft by NFLDraftScout.com. Lance Zierlein of NFL.com predicted that he would go undrafted and be a priority free agent, stating that Bello "needs to be stronger and tougher to hold up as a 4–3 linebacker which is where he'll likely project. Teams could look to bulk him up and see if he could become a situational rusher off the edge, but he'll have to become a quality special teams player to make that a possibility."

Pre-draft measurables
Height	Weight	Arm length	Hand span	40-yard dash	10-yard split	20-yard split	20-yard shuttle	Three-cone drill	Vertical jump	Broad jump	Bench press
6 ft 2 in (1.88 m)	228 lb (103 kg)	33 7/8 in (0.86 m)	9 in (0.23 m)	4.56 s	1.46 s	2.46 s	4.17 s	6.71 s	33 1/2 in (0.85 m)	10 ft 9 in (3.28 m)	10 reps
All values from Illinois State and Northwestern Pro Day

=== Cleveland Browns ===
Bello signed with the Cleveland Browns as an undrafted free agent on May 4, 2017. He was waived by the Browns on September 1 and signed to the team's practice squad on September 4. He was promoted to the active roster on September 8, 2017.

Bello was waived by the Browns on September 1, 2018.

=== Arizona Cardinals ===
On September 3, 2018, Bello was signed to the Arizona Cardinals' practice squad. He was released by the Cardinals on September 18, 2018.

=== Philadelphia Eagles ===
On October 16, 2018, Bello was signed to the Philadelphia Eagles practice squad. He was promoted to the active roster on December 14, 2018. On June 5, 2019, the Eagles waived Bello.

=== Houston Texans ===
On July 27, 2019, Bello signed with the Houston Texans. He was waived/injured during final roster cuts on August 31, and reverted to the team's injured reserve list the next day. He was waived from injured reserve with an injury settlement on September 4.

=== Green Bay Packers ===
On October 1, 2019, Bello was signed to the Green Bay Packers practice squad, but was released three days later.

=== New York Jets ===
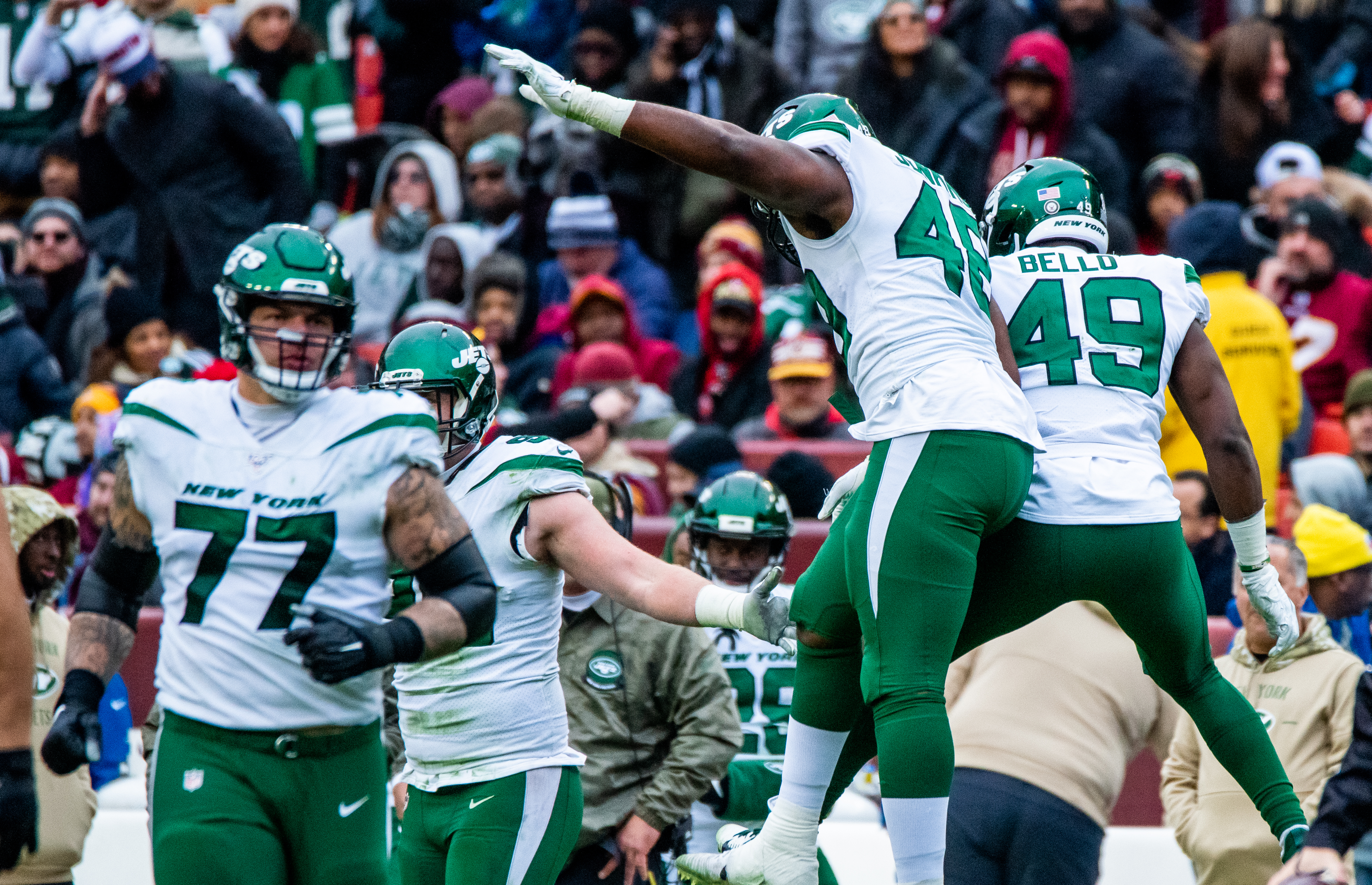
Bello in a game against the Washington Redskins

On October 30, 2019, Bello was signed by the New York Jets, but was released eight days later. He was re-signed on November 12.

Bello re-signed with the Jets on April 23, 2020. He was waived on September 1, 2020.

=== Los Angeles Chargers ===
On September 30, 2020, Bello was signed to the Los Angeles Chargers practice squad. He was elevated to the active roster on November 21, November 28, and December 12 for the team's weeks 11, 12, and 14 games against the New York Jets, Buffalo Bills, and Atlanta Falcons, and reverted to the practice squad after each game. He was signed to the active roster on December 17, 2020.

=== Tennessee Titans ===
Bello signed with the Tennessee Titans on April 23, 2021. He was placed on injured reserve on August 15, 2021.

=== Philadelphia Stars ===
Bello signed with the Philadelphia Stars of the USFL on May 9, 2023.

=== Arlington Renegades ===
On January 15, 2024, Bello was selected by the Arlington Renegades in the fourth round of the Super Draft portion of the 2024 UFL dispersal draft. He was released on March 10, 2024.

== Personal life ==
Bello is of Nigerian descent.
