= Lincoln-Way Community High School District 210 =

School district in the southwest suburbs of Chicago

Coordinates: 41°30′46″N 87°55′44″W

Address
- 1801 E Lincoln Hwy New Lenox, Illinois, 60451; United States

District information
- Type: Public
- Grades: 9–12
- Schools: Lincoln-Way North High School, Lincoln-Way East High School, Lincoln-Way West High School and Lincoln-Way Central High School
- NCES District ID: 1723070

Students and staff
- Students: 6,721

Other information
- Website: www.lw210.org

Lincoln-Way Community High School District 210 is a school district in the southwest suburbs of Chicago. Created in 1951, the district serves the communities of New Lenox, Frankfort, Mokena, Manhattan, and small portions of Tinley Park, Orland Park and Homer Glen. The three schools comprising the district are Lincoln-Way Central High School, Lincoln-Way East High School, and Lincoln-Way West High School. A fourth high school, Lincoln-Way North High School, was closed at the end of the 2015–2016 school year as part of a deficit reduction plan. Lincoln-Way Central and Lincoln-Way West are located in New Lenox, Lincoln-Way East is located in Frankfort and Lincoln-Way North is in Frankfort Square. District 210 offices are located at Lincoln-Way Central.

== History ==
Each year the Lincoln-Way district continues to grow, gaining an average of 250 students per annum. Both Lincoln-Way Central and Lincoln-Way East are built to accommodate 3,750 students. While Lincoln-Way North and Lincoln-Way West are built to accommodate 2,500 students. During the 2007-2008 school year, Lincoln-Way East had over 4,100 students: causing massive overcrowding issues in classrooms and hallways.

On March 21, 2006, voters approved - by 20% - a proposal to build 2 new schools in the next three years. Lincoln-Way North opened to Freshmen, Sophomores, and Juniors in 2008. North is located in Frankfort at the corner of Vollmer Road and Harlem, serving Frankfort Square, parts of Mokena and Tinley Park. The mascot is the Lincoln-Way North Phoenix. Their colors are Vegas gold and black. Lincoln-Way West opened to the same classes in 2009 in New Lenox at Illinois Highway and Gougar Road. Their mascot is the Lincoln-Way West Warriors, with their new colors being orange and black.

All four Lincoln-Way High Schools are intended to have equal high-quality facilities to include: 2-6 lane, 25-yard swimming pools, state-of-the-art auditoriums, field houses, turf football fields, indoor and outdoor running tracks, large gymnasiums, lighted baseball and softball fields, as well as many other amenities. Lincoln-Way North and Lincoln-Way West are identical in design and amenities, however, each has a slightly different configuration. Both schools have 103 classrooms. Additionally, The Lincoln-Way North Auditorium is home to the Illinois Philharmonic Orchestra: the auditorium was built with the orchestra in mind and is fully soundproof with many other great features.

On August 13, 2015, the Lincoln-Way Community board of education voted to close Lincoln-Way North following slower than average growth and citing budget concerns. Lincoln-Way North was closed at the end of the 2015-2016 school year. The consolidated three-school district now comprises Lincoln-Way Central and Lincoln-Way West in New Lenox and Lincoln-Way East in Frankfort.

== Corruption ==
Former superintendent Lawrence Wyllie, who retired in 2013, was indicted for five counts of wire fraud and one count of embezzlement in September 2018. These charges included fraudulent portrayal of the district's financial health and the use of school funds to create a private dog training business which provided no benefit to the school district. The case was delayed for years and charges were dropped in June 2024, with prosecutors accepting the claim that Wyllie's failing health prevented him from participating in his own defense. Wyllie owns one of the largest taxpayer-funded annuity pensions in the state, collecting $312,000 in 2016 and approximately $371,700 in 2022.

== Prairie State Achievement Exam ==
In 2008 the Lincoln-Way High Schools placed in the top 6% of high schools for the Prairie State Achievement Exam (PSAE). Lincoln-Way East ranked 33 and Lincoln-Way Central ranked 44 out of the 654 public high schools in the state. Both are in the top 50 in the State of Illinois on the PSAE test, according to statistics in the Chicago Tribune. The PSAE measures the achievement of junior students relative to the Illinois Learning Standards. The two-day PSAE exam consists of the ACT, Work Keys and ISBE-developed tests. Lincoln-Way High School District 210 is also the lowest per pupil in operating cost in the six county Chicago metropolitan area. In 2007 the district schools were ranked in the top 9% of high schools in the State of Illinois. Lincoln-Way East and Lincoln-Way Central rank number one and two for the Will County schools.
