= Nick Allegretti =

American football player (born 1996)

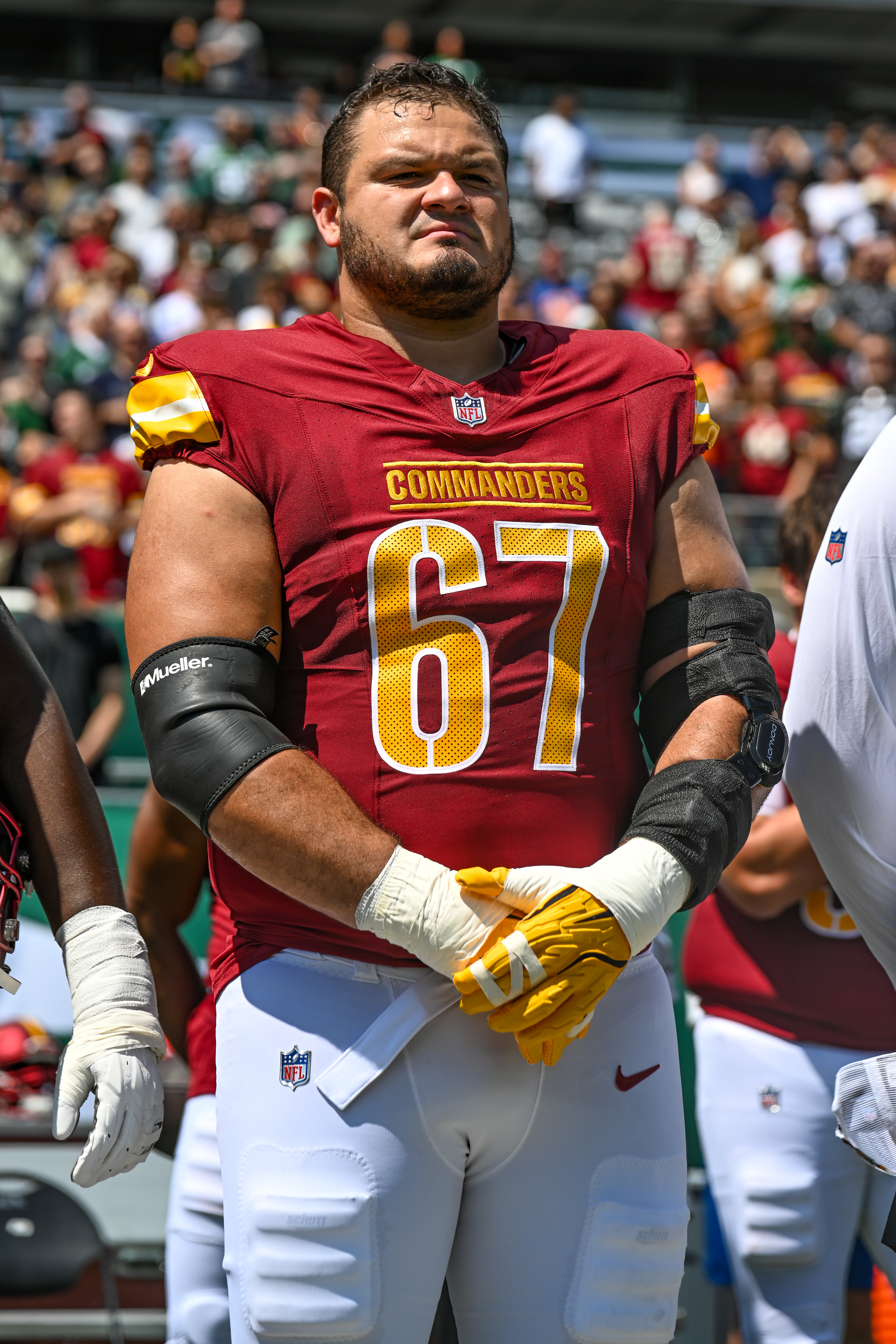
- Allegretti with the Washington Commanders in 2024

No. 67 – Washington Commanders
- Positions: Center, Guard
- Roster status: Active

Personal information
- Born: April 21, 1996 (age 30); Frankfort, Illinois, U.S.
- Listed height: 6 ft 4 in (1.93 m)
- Listed weight: 310 lb (141 kg)

Career information
- High school: Lincoln-Way East (Frankfort)
- College: Illinois (2014–2018)
- NFL draft: 2019: 7th round, 216th overall pick

Career history
- Kansas City Chiefs (2019–2023); Washington Commanders (2024–present)

Awards and highlights
- 3× Super Bowl champion (LIV, LVII, LVIII)

Career NFL statistics as of Week 4, 2026
- Games played: 111
- Games started: 37
- Stats at Pro Football Reference

Nick Allegretti (born April 21, 1996) is an American professional football center and guard for the Washington Commanders of the National Football League (NFL). He played college football for the Illinois Fighting Illini and was selected by the Kansas City Chiefs in the seventh round of the 2019 NFL draft. Allegretti won Super Bowls LIV, LVII, and LVIII during his tenure with the Chiefs.

== Early life ==
Allegretti attended Lincoln-Way East High School in Frankfort, Illinois, a suburb of Chicago. While there, he played for both the school's football and wrestling programs. As an offensive lineman, he was an all-state selection twice, and was a state finalist in Wrestling and with his varsity football team

== College career ==
Allegretti played as an offensive lineman for the Illinois Fighting Illini, starting as a freshman in the 2014 season. He remained with the Illinois program for the entirety of his collegiate career, with the 2018 season being his last with the team. He redshirted his first season at Illinois. Afterwards, he would play in 48 consecutive games, including as a starter in the last 36 games of his collegiate career.

== Professional career ==
Pre-draft measurables
Height	Weight	Arm length	Hand span	Wingspan	40-yard dash	10-yard split	20-yard split	20-yard shuttle	Three-cone drill	Vertical jump	Broad jump	Bench press
6 ft 4 1/4 in (1.94 m)	310 lb (141 kg)	32 1/4 in (0.82 m)	10 1/8 in (0.26 m)	6 ft 7 in (2.01 m)	5.32 s	1.81 s	3.05 s	4.66 s	7.56 s	29.5 in (0.75 m)	8 ft 7 in (2.62 m)	22 reps
All values from Pro Day

=== Kansas City Chiefs ===
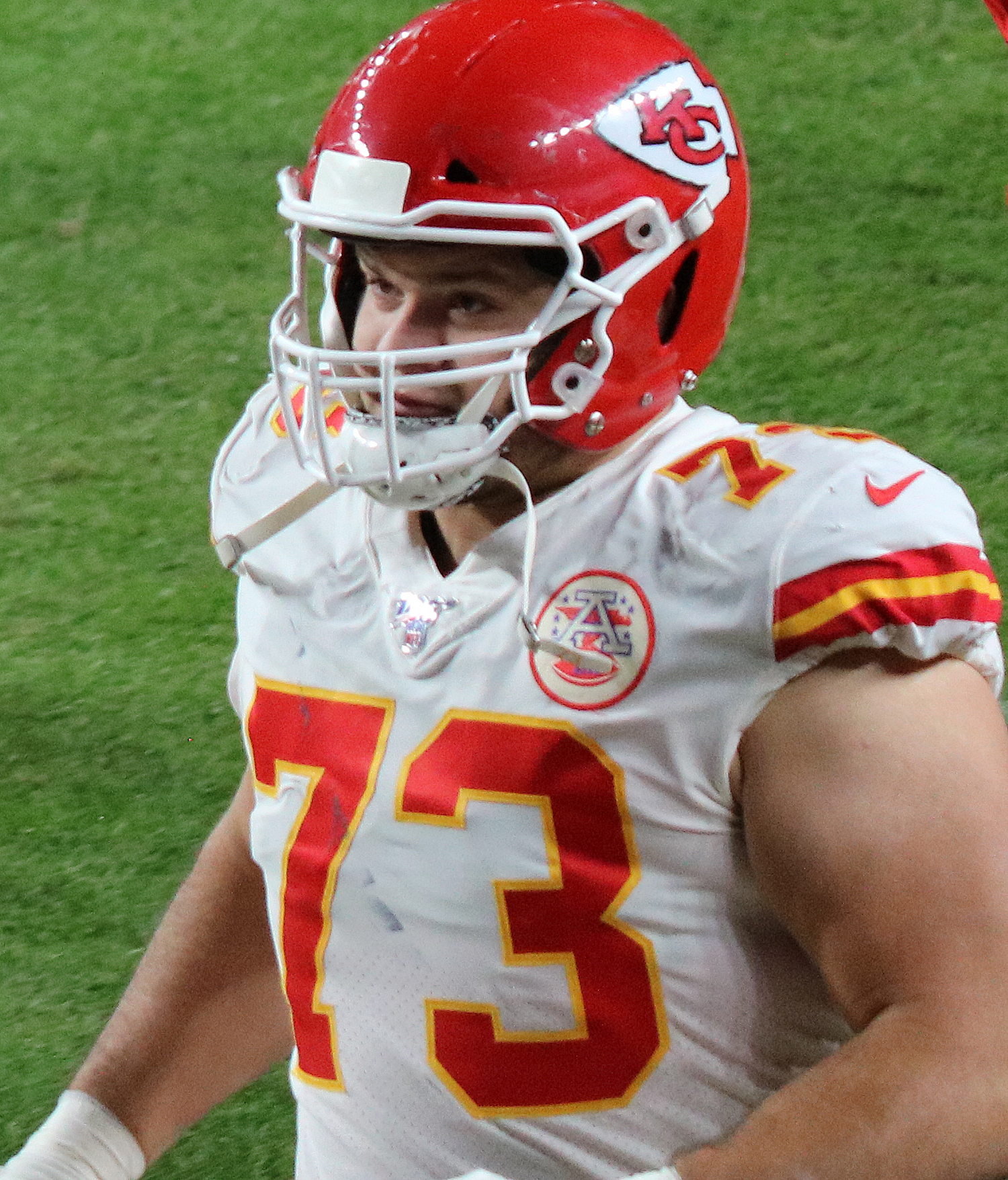
Allegretti with the Kansas City Chiefs in 2019

Allegretti was selected by the Kansas City Chiefs in the seventh round with the 216th overall pick in the 2019 NFL draft. Allegretti played seven games during his rookie season of 2019. He won Super Bowl LIV with the Chiefs when they defeated the San Francisco 49ers by a score of 31–20. In the 2020 season, Allegretti appeared in all 16 regular season games and started nine. He started in the Chiefs' three postseason games that year. In the 2021 season, he mainly played in backup role except for Week 17 against the Bengals. He scored his first touchdown on a one-yard reception against the Pittsburgh Steelers in the Wild Card Round of the playoffs on January 16, 2022. In the 2022 season, Allegretti appeared in 17 regular season games and started three. He became a Super Bowl champion for the second time when the Chiefs defeated the Philadelphia Eagles in Super Bowl LVII 38–35.

On March 17, 2023, Allegretti re-signed with the Chiefs. After mostly being a backup throughout the season, Allegretti became the Chiefs starter for the AFC Championship Game and Super Bowl LVIII after Joe Thuney got injured. The Chiefs won both games and Allegretti won his third Super Bowl ring, despite playing much of the Super Bowl with a torn UCL.

=== Washington Commanders ===
On March 14, 2024, Allegretti signed a three-year, $16 million contract with the Washington Commanders. He started at left guard in all 17 regular season games and all three postseason games for the Commanders in the 2024 season.

During the 2025 offseason, Allegretti switched to right guard after the team chose to switch Brandon Coleman from left tackle to left guard. Before the start of the 2025 season, the Commanders announced that he and Andrew Wylie would split right guard duties as fill-ins for incumbent starter, Sam Cosmi, who was on the physically unable to perform (PUP) list to start the season. He started at center for the last two games of the 2025 season following Tyler Biadasz being placed on injured reserve.

On March 9, 2026, Allegretti signed a new two-year contract with the Commanders, running through the 2027 season. Following the team's decision to release Biadasz during the 2026 offseason, the Commanders made Allegretti their starting center despite missing most of training camp and every preseason game due to a calf injury. After starting in the first two games of the 2026 season, Allegretti was benched in favor of free agent signing Lucas Patrick who took over as the Commanders' starting center in Week 3.

== NFL career statistics ==
Legend
Won the Super Bowl

Year	Team	Games	
Year	Team	GP	GS
2019	KC	7	0
2020	KC	16	9
2021	KC	17	0
2022	KC	17	3
2023	KC	17	1
2024	WAS	17	17
2025	WAS	16	4
Career		107	34

== Personal life ==
Allegretti and his wife, Christina, have twin daughters. His twins were born on the morning of February 12, 2023, the same day Allegretti won Super Bowl LVII, his second championship.

Allegretti is an avid coin collector.
