= Old Plank Road Trail (Wisconsin) =

Trail in northeastern Wisconsin

- Length: 37.6 mi (60.5 km)
- Location: Fond du Lac County, Wisconsin; Sheboygan County, Wisconsin
- Established: late 1970s
- Use: Shared-use path
- Maintainer: WisDOT (right of way); Fond du Lac County, Wisconsin; Sheboygan County, Wisconsin (maintenance and operations)
- Website: Old Plank Road Trail (Sheboygan County)

The Old Plank Road Trail is a 37.6-mile (60.5 km) shared-use path in Fond du Lac County and Sheboygan County in Wisconsin. It runs for approximately 21 miles (34 km) in Sheboygan County before entering Fond du Lac County. Outside the Sheboygan trailhead that starts with a tunnel beneath Interstate 43, the trail's entire length is along the right of way of Wisconsin Highway 23 (WIS 23), with fencing preventing access to the highway outside of intersection otherwise.

== History ==
The general route of the trail (and the bordering WIS 23) had been used as a footpath by Native Americans; later, the route was occupied by a plank road. The original approximately 17-mile (27 km) section from the city of Sheboygan to Greenbush was constructed over the course of 1977 to the early 1990s with the expansion and relocation of WIS 23 out of the cities between Sheboygan and Fond du Lac; some portions of the trail use acquired right-of-way off the path of the original Old Plank Road, which has had portions given over to local control.

Between 2019 and 2022, the portions of the trail in Sheboygan and Fond du Lac counties (approximately 17-mile (27 km)) was completed to connect both portions at the county line as part of the expansion of WIS 23's remaining two-lane portions as a four-lane expressway. This included the final 4.4 miles (7.1 km) uncompleted between Greenbush and the Fond du Lac County line.

== Route ==
The trail begins at the end of Erie Avenue in Sheboygan, the former Lower Falls Road, where it tunnels beneath Interstate 43; the trail intersects with Kohler's portion of Erie Avenue, which runs to Twin Oaks Road and provides access to the Kohler Company plant property, with the trail itself running northwest along the cloverleaf interchange with WIS 23.(43.7494°N 87.7634°W).

It runs west along the southern edge of WIS 23, detouring briefly near the intersection with WIS 67. At the intersection with County Trunk Highway UU in Fond du Lac County, the trail switches to running along the northern side of WIS 23 before ending at the intersection with the city-managed Prairie Trail, which runs along the west side of the U.S. 151 bypass in Fond du Lac and north to meet with the Peebles trail(43.7838°N 88.4018°W).
