= Lincoln-Way West High School =

Location
- 21701 S. Gougar Road; New Lenox, Illinois 60451; United States; 41°29′40″N 88°00′13″W

Information
- School type: Public Secondary
- Opened: 2009
- School district: Lincoln-Way Com. H.S. 210
- Superintendent: Scott Tingley
- Principal: Jennifer Killeen
- Teaching staff: 110.67 (FTE)
- Grades: 9–12
- Gender: coed
- Enrollment: 2,005 (2023-2024)
- Student to teacher ratio: 18.12
- Campus size: 100 acres
- Campus type: Suburban
- Colors: Orange; Black
- Athletics conference: Southwest Suburban
- Mascot: Warrior
- Team name: Warriors
- Rival: Lincoln-Way East; Lincoln-Way Central
- Accreditation: Illinois State Board of Education
- Newspaper: The West Gazette
- Website: https://www.lw210.org/o/west/

Lincoln-Way West High School or LWW, is a public four-year high school located about 1.5 miles south of Lincoln Highway near the intersection of Gougar Road and Illinois Highway in New Lenox, Illinois, a southwest suburb of Chicago, Illinois, in the United States. It is the part of Lincoln-Way Community High School District 210. Students living within the Lincoln-Way boundaries of Liberty Junior High in New Lenox School District 122 and Manhattan Junior High in Manhattan School District 114 attend Lincoln-Way West.

== Racial/Gender makeup ==
The student body makeup is 50 percent male and 50 percent female, and the total minority enrollment is 12 percent. As of 2021, there are 1,929 students enrolled, with 75 full-time teachers, creating a 19 student to teacher ratio.

== History ==
Lincoln-Way West opened in 2009 to reduce the student population at Lincoln-Way Central High School. Sitting on 100 acres, Lincoln-Way West is the largest site of the three high schools that comprise Lincoln-Way Community High School District 210.

== Athletics ==
Lincoln-Way West competes as a member of the Southwest Suburban Conference. The school is a member of the Illinois High School Association (IHSA), which governs most athletics and competitive activities in Illinois. Teams are called the "Warriors".

The school sponsors interscholastic teams for young men and women in basketball, bowling, cross country, golf, gymnastics, soccer, swimming & diving, tennis, track & field, volleyball, esports and water polo. Young women may compete in badminton, cheerleading, poms, and softball, while young men may also compete in baseball, football, and wrestling. Now recognized by the IHSA, the school's athletic department also oversees lacrosse teams for young men and women.

The following teams have won or finished in the top four of their respective IHSA sponsored state championship tournament or meet:

- Badminton (Girls): 2nd Place (2019–20); Conference Champions (2015)
- Baseball (Boys): Regional Champions (2022); Sectional Champions (2022)
- Basketball (Boys): 2nd Place (2015–16); Regionals Champions (2015, 2016); Sectional Champions (2015–16); Super-Sectional Champions (2015–16); (3A) 2nd Place (2015-16)
- Basketball (Girls): 2nd Place (2019–20); Super-Sectional Champions (2019–20); Sectional Champions (2019–20); Regional Champions (2009-2010, 2018–19, 2019–20)
- Cheerleading: 3rd Place (2014–15, 2020–21); 2nd Place (2022–23)
- Cross Country(Boys): Regional Champs (2011–12, 2012–2013)
- Cross Country (Girls): Conference Champs (2011–12); Regional Champs (2011-2012)
- Football: Conference Champs (2010–11, 2011–12); Quarter finalist (2013, 2014); State runner up (2016)
- Gymnastics (Boys): State Champions (2010–11)
- Soccer (Boys): Regional Champs (2010–11, 2012–13, 2019–20); Sectional Champs (2019-2020); Super-Sectional Champs (2019-2020)
- Soccer (Girls): Regional Champs (2014-2019); Sectional Champs; (2016-2017)
- Wrestling: 3rd Place; (2016–17); Conference Champs (2009-2010, 2010–2011, 2011–2012, 2012–2013); Regional Champs ( 2010–11, 2011–12, 2012–13, 2013–14); State Quarterfinals (2012–13)

== Marching Band ==
Their Marching Band has performed shows such as "Warrior: Raising to Battle" (2009), "Ring of Fire: Music of the Pacific Rim" (2010), "Trapped!" (2011), "Urban Sprawl" (2012), "Infinite: The Sky Of Beauty And Dreaming" (2013), "Seven" (2014), and "Go West!" (2015).

- Bands of America Finalist: 2009
- State of Illinois Invitational Marching Band Finalist: 2010, 2014, 2015

== Notable alumni ==
- B. J. Bello (b. 1994), an American football linebacker who is a free agent
