= Old Plank Road Trail (Illinois) =

Public rail trail in Illinois, US

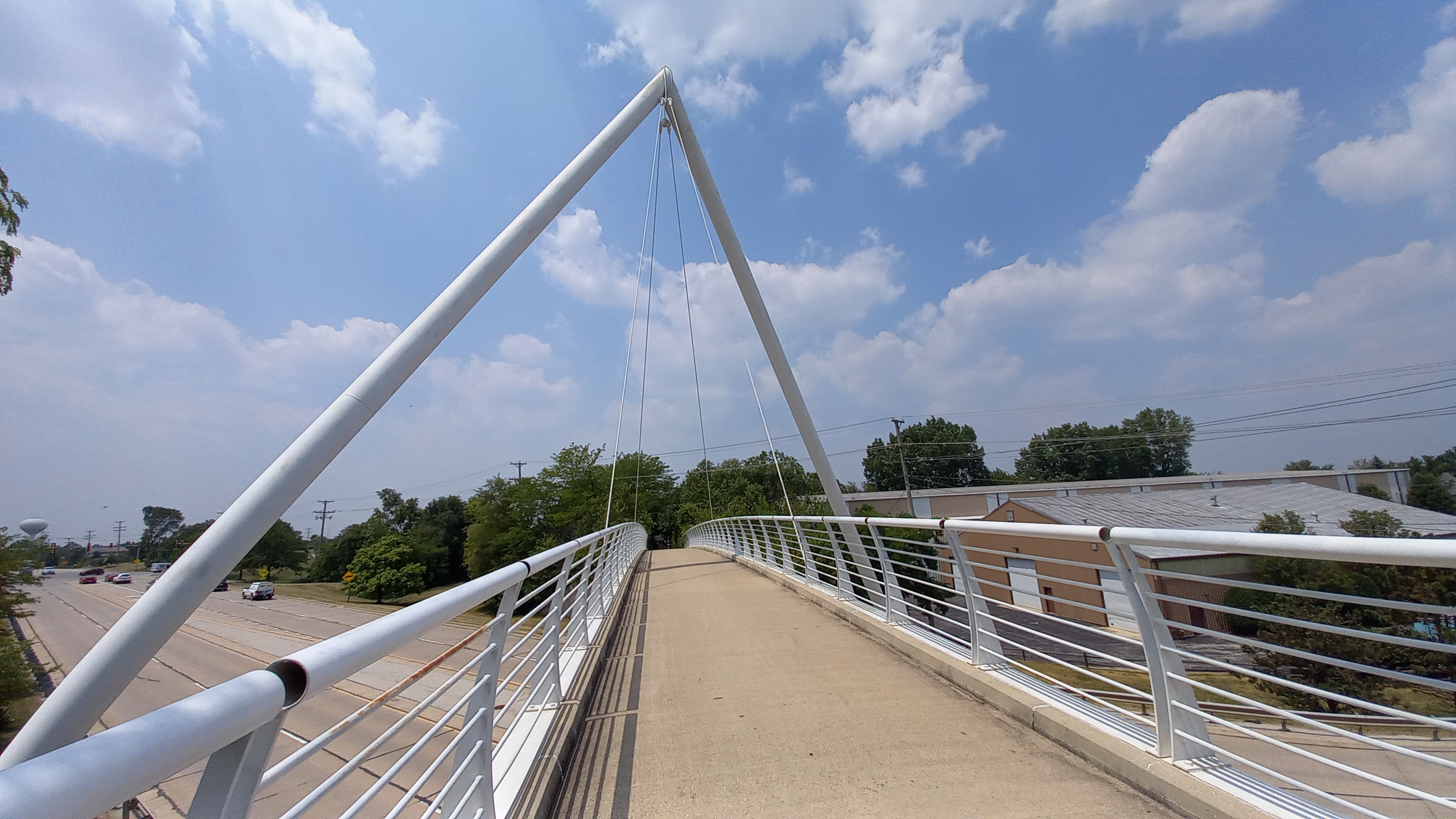
- Old Plank Road Trail crossing above US 45 in Frankfort via a cable-stayed bridge
- Length: 22 mi (35 km)
- Location: Will County–Cook County, Illinois, United States
- Established: 1997
- Began construction: 1996
- Completed: 1997; 29 years ago
- Trailheads: Joliet, Illinois (41°31′23.6″N 88°3′16.0″W); Chicago Heights, Illinois (41°29′56.5″N 87°39′4.6″W)
- Website: https://oprt.org/

Trail map
- Old Plank Road Trail highlighted in green

The Old Plank Road Trail is a 22-mile-long (35 km) public rail trail in Cook County and Will County within the U.S. state of Illinois. It stretches westward from Chicago Heights to Joliet, serving suburbs such as Frankfort and New Lenox.

== History ==
The Old Plank Road Trail occupies the western half of a plank road right-of-way acquired about 1850 and improved in 1855 into a railroad line, chartered as the Joliet and Northern Indiana Railroad. This nominally independent railroad line, which stretched from Joliet to Lake Station, Indiana, appears to have been affiliated with the Michigan Central Railroad from the start of its existence. Soon this section of roadbed was called the Joliet Cutoff and was operated by the Michigan Central as a spur line of its primary right-of-way from Indiana into downtown Chicago.

In the early 1900s, railroad use of this roadbed began to decline. Trains were beginning to be partly replaced by rubber-tired vehicles that used new paved roads such as the Lincoln Highway (now U.S. Highway 30, US 30), which parallels the Old Plank Road Trail throughout its entire length. Service on this portion of the Joliet Cutoff ended in 1972. This abandonment opened the way for the railroad bed to be rededicated to public trail use.

Starting in 1977, local residents organized to preserve the historic right-of-way for trail use. In 1982, the right-of-way was renamed the Old Plank Road Trail. The trail was officially opened to the public in July 1997.

Several strips of land along the roadbed preserve remnants of the Chicago area's original tallgrass prairie, on ground that had never been plowed since the land was originally acquired for plank road purposes about 1850. The Old Plank Road Trail is currently operated by the Forest Preserve District of Will County and by various townships and municipalities with jurisdiction over the trail. The trail is served by numerous cross-streets adjacent to US 30, and by the Matteson stop on the Metra Electric north-south commuter train line.
