= New Lenox School District 122 =

School district in Illinois, USA

New Lenox School District 122 provides primary education services to students in grades kindergarten through 8. The superintendent is Dr. Lori Motsch. The student body is drawn primarily from the village of New Lenox, Illinois in Will County and surrounding areas.

== Schools ==
=== Elementary schools ===
- Tyler Elementary School
- Bentley Elementary School
- Haines Elementary School
- Nelson Prairie Elementary School
- Nelson Ridge Elementary School
- Oster-Oakview Elementary School
- Spencer Crossing Elementary School
- Spencer Pointe Elementary School

=== Middle schools ===
- Alex M. Martino Junior High School
- Liberty Junior High School

== See also ==
- Webster v. New Lenox School District
