= Lincoln-Way East High School =

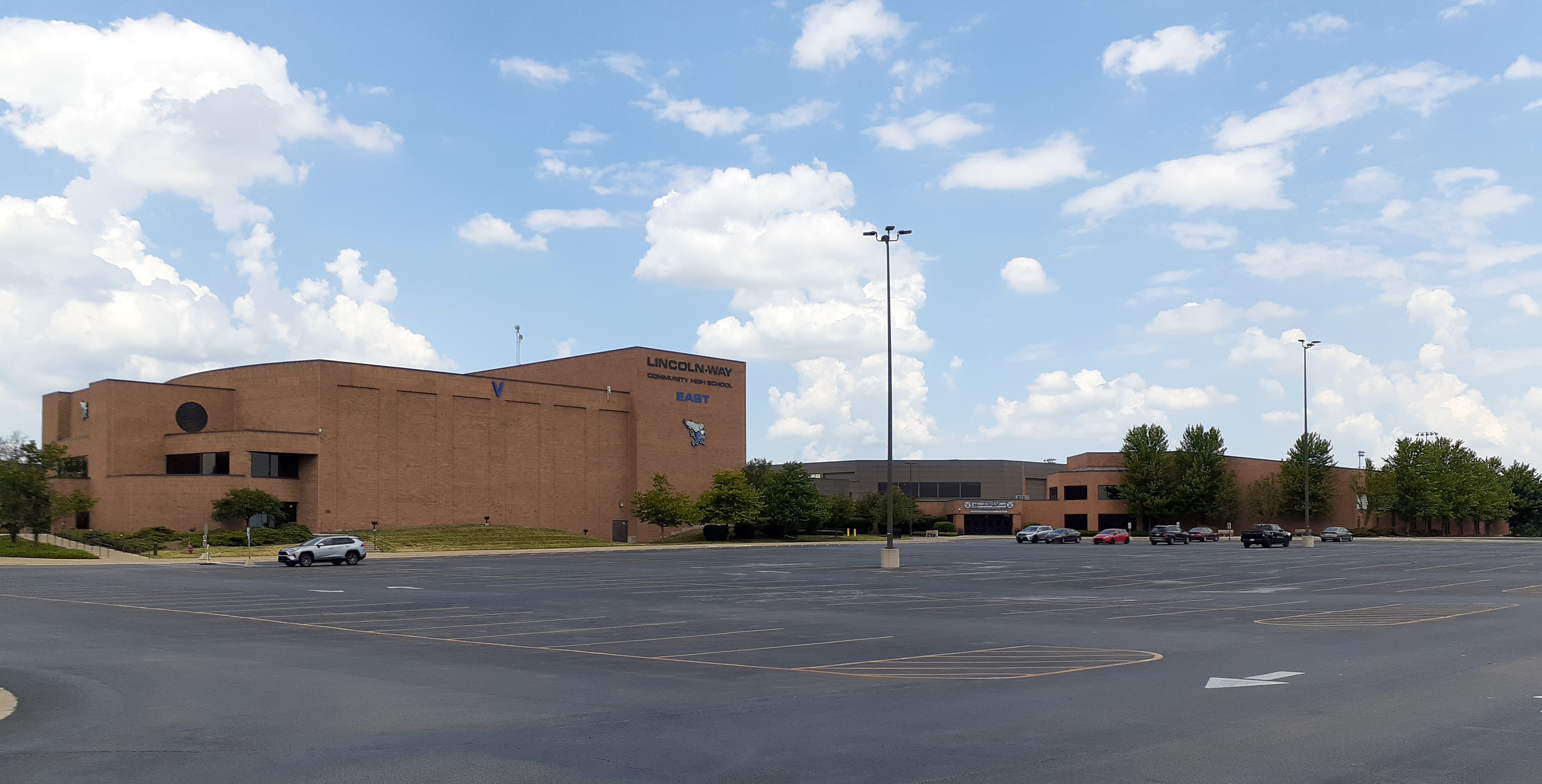

Location
- 201 Colorado Avenue; Frankfort, Illinois 60423; United States; 41.5129°N 87.8561°W

Information
- School type: Public secondary
- Opened: 1977 (9–10); 2001 (9–12)
- School district: Lincoln-Way Com. H.S. 210
- Superintendent: Scott Tingley
- Principal: Toriano Griggs
- Teaching staff: 147.95 (on an FTE basis)
- Grades: 9–12
- Gender: Coed
- Enrollment: 2,728 (2023–2024)
  - Grade 9: 634 students
  - Grade 10: 678 students
  - Grade 11: 680 students
  - Grade 12: 736 students
- Student to teacher ratio: 18.44
- Area: Southwest suburbs
- Campus type: Suburban
- Colors: Blue; Black
- Athletics conference: Southwest Suburban
- Mascot: Yugo the Griffin
- Team name: Griffins
- Rival: Lincoln-Way West; Lincoln-Way Central
- Accreditation: Illinois State Board of Education
- Website: www.lw210.org/o/east

Lincoln-Way East High School (LWE) is a four-year public high school about three miles south of Interstate 80 near the intersection of Colorado Avenue, U.S. Route 45 (La Grange Road), and U.S. Route 30 (Lincoln Highway) in Frankfort, Illinois, a suburb of Chicago, Illinois, in the United States. It is a part of Lincoln-Way Community High School District 210, which also includes Lincoln-Way Central High School, Lincoln-Way West High School, and formerly Lincoln-Way North High School.

== History ==
In 1974, voters approved a $4,985,000 bond issue to develop a new freshman–sophomore building on the Frankfort site. Construction began in 1975, and the school opened in 1977 as Lincoln-Way High School East Campus. In 1992, voters agreed to double the size of the campus to accommodate growth. Facilities added included a 42-classroom academic wing, a field house, and an auditorium. The expansion was completed in 1995.

In 1997, citizens of District No. 210 approved a $60 million building bond referendum to split the existing freshman–sophomore / junior–senior configuration into two separate four-year high schools and to add to the existing East and Central Campuses. The East Campus added 50 classrooms and an Olympic-sized swimming pool. The Central Campus added 50 classrooms, an Olympic-sized swimming pool, a performing arts auditorium, music classrooms, nursing office, and new administrative offices (PPS). The splitting of Lincoln-Way into two separate high schools became official for the 2001–02 school year as the East Campus became Lincoln-Way East High School.

== Academics ==
As of 2018, Lincoln-Way East was considered an "exemplary" school, with 1,070 students taking Advanced Placement or dual credit courses, a 97.0% four-year graduation rate (98.3% five-year rate), and 90.6% of students going on to postsecondary education.

== Athletics ==
The athletic director is Mark Vander Kooi and the assistant athletic director is Elizabeth Hyland.

Lincoln-Way East competes as a member of the Southwest Suburban Conference. The school is a member of the Illinois High School Association (IHSA), which governs most athletics and competitive activities in Illinois. School colors are Blue and Black. Teams are called the "Griffins".

Lincoln-Way East sponsors interscholastic teams for boys and girls in basketball, bowling, cross country, golf, gymnastics, soccer, swimming, tennis, track and field, volleyball, and water polo. Girls also compete in badminton, cheerleading, dance, and softball, while boys also compete in baseball, football, and wrestling.

The following teams have won or finished in the top four of their respective IHSA sponsored state championship tournament or meet:

- Badminton (girls): Sectional Champions (2004–05, 2017–18, 2020–21, 2021-22)
- Basketball (girls): Regional Champions (2002–03, 2007–08, 2008–09, 2009–10, 2010–11, 2011–12, 2013–14, 2015–16, 2017–18)
- Bowling (boys): 3rd place (2006–07)
- Cheerleading: State Champions (2013–14, 2014–15, 2016–17, 2018–19, 2019–20, 2020–21, 2022–23)
- Cross Country (boys): Regional Champions (2011–12, 2017–18, 2020–21)
- Cross Country (girls): 2nd place (2004–05); Regional Champions (2006–07)
- Football: State Champions (2005–06, 2017–18, 2019–20); 2nd place (2012–13, 2022–23, 2023–24)
- Gymnastics (boys): State Champions (2005–06, 2010–11); 2nd place (2004–05, 2007–08, 2008–09, 2009–10, 2011–12)
- Golf (girls): Regional Champions (2007–08, 2008–09, 2013–14, 2020–21, 2021–22)
- Softball: State Champions (2001–02); 2nd place (2014–15, 2016–17); 4th place (2013–14)
- Swimming (boys): Sectional Champions (2004–05, 2005–06, 2006–07, 2007–08, 2008–09, 2010–11, 2014–15, 2015–16, 2016–17, 2017–18, 2018–19, 2021-22)
- Swimming (girls): Sectional Champions (2004–05, 20007-08, 2008–09, 2009–10, 2010–11, 2011–12, 2013–14, 2014–15, 2015–16, 2016–17, 2017–18, 2019-20)
- Tennis (boys): Sectional Champions (2002–03, 2005–06, 2006–07, 2007–08, 2008–09, 2009–10, 2010–11, 2012–13, 2013–14, 2014–15, 2015–16, 2016–17, 2017–18, 2020–21, 2021–22)
- Track (boys): Sectional Champions (2006–07, 2007–08, 2023–24)
- Track (girls): State Champions (2012–13, 2013–14, 2014–15, 2015–16, 2020–21); 2nd place (2010–11)
- Volleyball (boys): State Champions (2013–14, 2017–18); 2nd place (2016–17, 2021–22); 4th place (2006–07, 2020–21)
- Water polo (boys): 4th place (2018–19, 2020–21)
- Wrestling: Regional Champions (2003–04, 2004–05, 2005–06, 2006-07)

== Notable alumni ==
- Nick Allegretti – NFL guard for the Washington Commanders; Super Bowl LIV champion; Super Bowl LVII champion; Super Bowl LVIII champion
- Dietrich Enns – current MLB Pitcher, Baltimore Orioles
- Adam Gettis – former NFL guard
- A. J. Henning – NFL wide receiver
- Alex Storako – softball player
- Erika Lauren Wasilewski – former reality TV participant, radio personality
- Jonas Williams – college football quarterback for the USC Trojans

== Controversy ==
Five students from Lincoln-Way East High School have resigned from the institution in the wake of an investigation into racist behavior at a recent sporting event, according to Lincoln-Way Community High School District 210. School board officials voted unanimously to accept the voluntary withdrawals after an inquiry—which evaluated multi-angle video footage and interviews with witnesses, students, and legal counsel—uncovered students imitating monkey sounds and gestures during a September 4 game against Homewood-Flossmoor. Superintendent Dr. Scott Tingley confirmed the parents opted for voluntary withdrawal and the loss of all student rights to avoid formal expulsion proceedings.
