= Frankfort Square, Illinois =

Frankfort Square
- Unincorporated community Census designated place
- Location in Will County and the state of Illinois.
- Coordinates: 41°31′8″N 87°48′11″W
- Country: United States
- State: Illinois
- County: Will
- Township: Frankfort

Area
  - Total: 2.50 sq mi (6.47 km^{2})
  - Land: 2.50 sq mi (6.47 km^{2})
  - Water: 0 sq mi (0.00 km^{2})
- Elevation: 709 ft (216 m)

Population (2020)
  - Total: 8,968
  - Density: 3,592.7/sq mi (1,387.14/km^{2})
- Time zone: UTC-6 (CST)
  - Summer (DST): UTC-5 (CDT)
- ZIP code: 60423
- Area codes: 815, 779
- FIPS code: 17-27644

Frankfort Square is an unincorporated community and census-designated place (CDP) in Will County, Illinois, United States. Per the 2020 census, the population was 8,968.

== Geography ==
Frankfort Square is located at 41°31′8″N 87°48′11″W.

According to the United States Census Bureau, the CDP has a total area of 2.1 square miles (5.4 km^{2}), all land. It is bordered by Frankfort to the south, Tinley Park to the north and Matteson (in Cook County) to the east.

== Demographics ==
Historical population
Census	Pop.	Note	%±
2000	7,766		—
2010	9,276		19.4%
2020	8,968		−3.3%
U.S. Decennial Census; 2010 2020

=== Racial and ethnic composition ===
Frankfort Square CDP, Illinois – Racial and ethnic composition Note: the US Census treats Hispanic/Latino as an ethnic category. This table excludes Latinos from the racial categories and assigns them to a separate category. Hispanics/Latinos may be of any race.
Race / Ethnicity (NH = Non-Hispanic)	Pop 2000	Pop 2010	Pop 2020	% 2000	% 2010	% 2020
White alone (NH)	7,165	8,275	7,312	92.26%	89.21%	81.53%
Black or African American alone (NH)	99	113	265	1.27%	1.22%	2.95%
Native American or Alaska Native alone (NH)	1	10	9	0.01%	0.11%	0.10%
Asian alone (NH)	131	141	183	1.69%	1.52%	2.04%
Native Hawaiian or Pacific Islander alone (NH)	0	1	1	0.00%	0.01%	0.01%
Other race alone (NH)	1	8	22	0.01%	0.09%	0.25%
Mixed race or Multiracial (NH)	57	85	265	0.73%	0.92%	2.95%
Hispanic or Latino (any race)	312	643	911	4.02%	6.93%	10.16%
Total	7,766	9,276	8,968	100.00%	100.00%	100.00%

=== 2020 census ===
As of the 2020 census, Frankfort Square had a population of 8,968. The median age was 38.9 years. 22.5% of residents were under the age of 18 and 10.9% of residents were 65 years of age or older. For every 100 females there were 96.5 males, and for every 100 females age 18 and over there were 94.8 males age 18 and over.

100.0% of residents lived in urban areas, while 0.0% lived in rural areas.

There were 3,119 households in Frankfort Square, of which 35.5% had children under the age of 18 living in them. Of all households, 63.4% were married-couple households, 12.0% were households with a male householder and no spouse or partner present, and 19.4% were households with a female householder and no spouse or partner present. About 17.5% of all households were made up of individuals and 7.2% had someone living alone who was 65 years of age or older.

There were 3,160 housing units, of which 1.3% were vacant. The homeowner vacancy rate was 0.4% and the rental vacancy rate was 2.9%.

=== 2000 census ===
As of the census of 2000, there were 7,766 people, 2,363 households, and 2,018 families living in the CDP. The population density was 3,705.4 inhabitants per square mile (1,430.7/km^{2}). There were 2,376 housing units at an average density of 1,133.7 per square mile (437.7/km^{2}). The racial makeup of the CDP was 94.84% White, 1.27% African American, 0.05% Native American, 1.74% Asian, 1.21% from other races, and 0.89% from two or more races. Hispanic or Latino of any race were 4.02% of the population.

There were 2,363 households, out of which 57.7% had children under the age of 18 living with them, 73.5% were married couples living together, 8.6% had a female householder with no husband present, and 14.6% were non-families. 11.8% of all households were made up of individuals, and 1.4% had someone living alone who was 65 years of age or older. The average household size was 3.29 and the average family size was 3.60.

In the CDP, the population was spread out, with 36.1% under the age of 18, 7.0% from 18 to 24, 37.0% from 25 to 44, 17.6% from 45 to 64, and 2.3% who were 65 years of age or older. The median age was 31 years. For every 100 females, there were 97.8 males. For every 100 females age 18 and over, there were 96.9 males.

The average income for a household in the CDP is $69,459, and the median income for a family was $72,689. Males had a median income of $50,171 versus $30,750 for females. The per capita income for the CDP was $22,038. About 2.3% of families and 2.4% of the population were below the poverty line, including 3.2% of those under age 18 and 12.1% of those age 65 or over.

== Education ==
It is in the Summit Hill School District 161 and the Lincoln Way Community High School District 210.

== See also ==
- Frankfort Square Park District
