= Frankfort, Illinois =

- Village
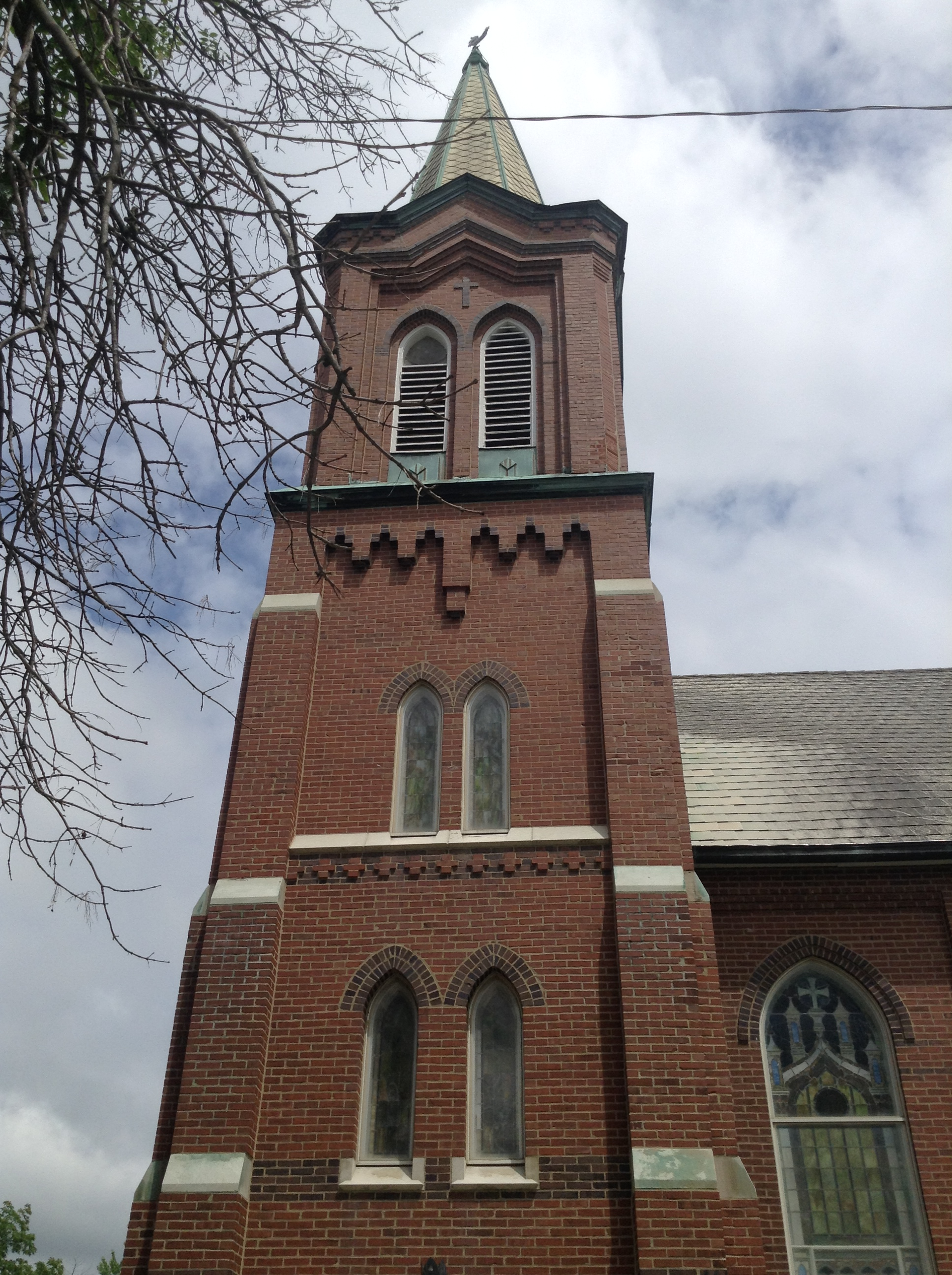
- St. Peter's United Church of Christ, Frankfort

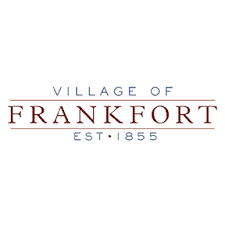
- Logo

- Location of Frankfort in Will and Cook Counties, Illinois
- Coordinates: 41°29′53″N 87°50′58″W
- Country: United States
- State: Illinois
- Counties: Will, Cook
- Townships: Frankfort, Rich
- Incorporated: 1879

Government
  - Type: Mayor-Council
  - Mayor: Keith Ogle (R)

Area
  - Total: 15.80 sq mi (40.91 km^{2})
  - Land: 15.80 sq mi (40.91 km^{2})
  - Water: 0 sq mi (0.00 km^{2})
- Elevation: 735 ft (224 m)

Population (2020)
  - Total: 20,296
  - Density: 1,285.0/sq mi (496.14/km^{2})
- Time zone: UTC-6 (CST)
  - Summer (DST): UTC-5 (CDT)
- ZIP code: 60423
- Area code: 815
- FIPS code: 17-27624
- GNIS feature ID: 2398915
- Website: www.frankfortil.org

Frankfort is a village in Will County and Cook County in the U.S. state of Illinois. It is a suburb of Chicago, about 28 miles (45 km) southwest of the city. As of the 2020 census, the population was 20,296.

Frankfort's historic downtown area contains the Frankfort Grainery, Breidert Green, and part of the Old Plank Road Trail, a 22-mile-long paved recreation trail. The village also contains Commissioners Park and multiple schools, including Lincoln-Way East High School, Hickory Creek Middle School, and Dr. Julian Rogus School.

== Name ==
The name "Frankfort" was taken from Frankfort Township designated by the Will County governing board. It was commonly known as "Frankfort Station" after the opening of the Joliet & Northern Indiana Railroad through the township in 1855, though the official plat of the community dated March 1855 shows the name as "Frankfort". Property deed abstracts and railroad documents also show that the name was always Frankfort. Local residents incorporated Frankfort as a village in 1879. It also has some reference to the German city Frankfurt.

== History ==
First inhabited by Native Americans, including the Potawatomi and Sac and Fox tribes, Frankfort was used as a conduit between the Des Plaines and St. Joseph rivers. The area was part of the Virginia Territory until the French signed a treaty with Manitoqua, the Potawatomi chief, for land in the Prestwick area. The first pioneers came to Frankfort in the early 1830s by means of the Des Plaines River from the southwest and by wagon from the east along the Sauk Trail, a roadway that still exists.

William Rice, the first non-native settler, made a permanent settlement in Frankfort in 1831. While the first pioneers, coming mainly from the New England colonies, were mostly of English and Scottish descent, German immigrants made the village of Frankfort a reality in the 1840s. They had fled harsh conditions in their homeland and were industrious and experienced farmers, soon buying most of the fertile farmland from the "Yankees", who were more inclined to provide services for local needs. Establishing both ownership and pride in the area, the German settlers implemented the first system of resident concern for local lands, which has been maintained ever since.

What is now known as Frankfort Township was originally part of the Hickory Creek Precinct. Will County was originally divided into ten precincts. In 1850, the county adopted the township form of government. Frederick Cappel named Frankfort Township after his native city, Frankfurt am Main, Germany. In 1855 the Joliet and Northern Indiana Railroad built a line through an area linking Joliet, Illinois, with Lake Station, Indiana. The J&NI Railroad was leased to the Michigan Central Railroad, and service was implemented in July 1855. Nelson D. Elwood, an officer of the rail line, and Sherman Bowen, a Joliet attorney and real estate man, jointly platted a village of around 23 acres (9.3 ha) in March 1855 and named it Frankfort after the township. It was commonly called "Frankfort Station" because of the railroad depot there, but when the village was incorporated, "station" was dropped from the name.

John McDonald became the first railroad agent in 1857.

In 1879, the village of Frankfort was incorporated, and elected John McDonald as the first Village President. Along with the establishment of the government, among the new administration's first undertakings was the institution of land use policies. Early recorded plans indicate a traditional grid pattern with residential uses surrounding the business district and railroad line and additional land for schools and public open spaces.

== Geography ==
According to the 2021 census gazetteer files, it has an area of 15.79 square miles (40.90 km^{2}), all land.

Frankfort is in the Chicago metropolitan area, about 28 miles south of downtown.

An unincorporated area north of the village of Frankfort (in Frankfort Township) is a census-designated place known as Frankfort Square.

The village is bordered by Richton Park to the east; Tinley Park, Frankfort Square, and Matteson to the northeast; Mokena and New Lenox to the west; and Monee and University Park to the southeast.

== Demographics ==
Historical population
Census	Pop.	Note	%±
1880	332		—
1890	431		29.8%
1900	250		−42.0%
1910	273		9.2%
1920	497		82.1%
1930	590		18.7%
1940	568		−3.7%
1950	685		20.6%
1960	1,135		65.7%
1970	2,325		104.8%
1980	4,357		87.4%
1990	7,180		64.8%
2000	10,391		44.7%
2010	17,782		71.1%
2020	20,296		14.1%
U.S. Decennial Census; 2010 2020

=== Racial and ethnic composition ===
Frankfort village, Illinois – Racial and ethnic composition Note: the US Census treats Hispanic/Latino as an ethnic category. This table excludes Latinos from the racial categories and assigns them to a separate category. Hispanics/Latinos may be of any race.
Race / Ethnicity (NH = Non-Hispanic)	Pop 2000	Pop 2010	Pop 2020	% 2000	% 2010	% 2020
White alone (NH)	9,592	15,234	16,168	92.31%	85.67%	79.66%
Black or African American alone (NH)	257	1,085	1,738	2.47%	6.10%	8.56%
Native American or Alaska Native alone (NH)	11	16	9	0.11%	0.09%	0.04%
Asian alone (NH)	221	462	659	2.13%	2.60%	3.25%
Native Hawaiian or Pacific Islander alone (NH)	0	2	1	0.00%	0.01%	0.00%
Other race alone (NH)	17	12	41	0.16%	0.07%	0.20%
Mixed race or Multiracial (NH)	53	156	589	0.51%	0.88%	2.90%
Hispanic or Latino (any race)	240	815	1,091	2.31%	4.58%	5.38%
Total	10,391	17,782	20,296	100.00%	100.00%	100.00%

=== 2020 census ===
As of the 2020 census, Frankfort had a population of 20,296. The median age was 42.7 years. 26.3% of residents were under the age of 18 and 16.9% of residents were 65 years of age or older. For every 100 females there were 96.0 males, and for every 100 females age 18 and over there were 95.5 males.

There were 6,653 households in Frankfort, of which 40.4% had children under the age of 18 living in them. Of all households, 74.6% were married-couple households, 8.6% were households with a male householder and no spouse or partner present, and 14.4% were households with a female householder and no spouse or partner present. About 13.2% of all households were made up of individuals and 7.8% had someone living alone who was 65 years of age or older. The village had 5,305 families, with an average household size of 3.42 and an average family size of 3.13.

The population density was 1,285.04 inhabitants per square mile (496.16/km^{2}). There were 6,902 housing units at an average density of 437.00 per square mile (168.73/km^{2}), of which 3.6% were vacant. The homeowner vacancy rate was 1.2% and the rental vacancy rate was 6.3%.

99.8% of residents lived in urban areas, while 0.2% lived in rural areas.

=== Income and poverty ===
The median income for a household in the village was $140,731, and the median income for a family was $151,518. Males had a median income of $86,382 versus $52,719 for females. The per capita income for the village was $51,278. About 2.3% of families and 2.6% of the population were below the poverty line, including 3.1% of those under age 18 and 1.2% of those age 65 or over.

== Government ==
Frankfort is divided between two congressional districts. Most of it is in Illinois's 1st congressional district, but the small portion in Cook County is in the 2nd district.

== Transportation ==
=== Roads ===
US 45 (La Grange Road) major north–south thoroughfare passes through the middle of Frankfort, and shares an intersection with Lincoln Highway.
US 30 (Lincoln Highway) major east–west thoroughfare passes through the middle of Frankfort.
CR 74 (Laraway Road) east-west county highway passes through the southern portion of Frankfort.

== Education ==
Frankfort School District 157C and Summit Hill District 161 serve residents of Frankfort. As of 2018 the former district's middle school "Hickory Creek" is ranked 5th in the state.

Frankfort is home to Lincoln-Way East High School. Lincoln-Way East has won state championships in football (2005, 2017, 2019), girls' softball (2002), boys' gymnastics (2006, 2011), girls' track & field (2014, 2015, 2016), girls' cheerleading (2014, 2015, 2017), Summer League baseball, and marching band (2007, 2008). Lincoln-Way North has state championships in boys' gymnastics (2011) and Summer League baseball (2011).

== Notable people ==
- Nick Allegretti, guard for the Kansas City Chiefs
- Lou Boudreau, Hall of Fame baseball player
- Dennis DeYoung, former lead singer of the rock band Styx
- Dan Giordano, former linebacker for the Arizona Cardinals
- Jason Vander Laan, football tight end for the Carolina Panthers
- Erika Lauren, member of MTV's The Real World: D.C. cast
- George E. Sangmeister (1931–2007), member of the United States House of Representatives from Illinois.
