= Humphrey House =

Humphrey House may refer to:

- Grant-Humphreys Mansion, Denver, Colorado, listed on the National Register of Historic Places (NRHP)
- John Humphrey House (Simsbury, Connecticut), NRHP-listed
- Humphrey House (Evergreen, Colorado), listed on the NRHP in Jefferson County, Colorado
- John Humphrey House (Orland Park, Illinois), NRHP-listed
- Humphrey Place (Bedford, Kentucky), listed on the NRHP in Trimble County, Kentucky
- Humphrey-McMeekin House, Louisville, Kentucky, listed on the NRHP in Jefferson County, Kentucky
- Humphrey House (Reno, Nevada), NRHP-listed
- Friend Humphrey House, Colonie, New York, NRHP-listed
- Humphrey-Williams House, Lumberton, North Carolina, NRHP-listed
- Humphrey-Williams Plantation, Lumberton, North Carolina, NRHP-listed
- Herman L. Humphrey House, Hudson, Wisconsin, NRHP-listed

== See also ==
- Humphry Marshall House
- Humphreys House (disambiguation)
- John Humphrey House (disambiguation)
