= John Humphrey House =

John Humphrey House may refer to:

- John Humphrey House (Simsbury, Connecticut), listed on the National Register of Historic Places in Hartford County, Connecticut
- John Humphrey House (Orland Park, Illinois), listed on the National Register of Historic Places in Cook County, Illinois

== See also ==
- Humphrey House (disambiguation)
