= Orland Square Mall =

Shopping mall in Orland Park, Illinois

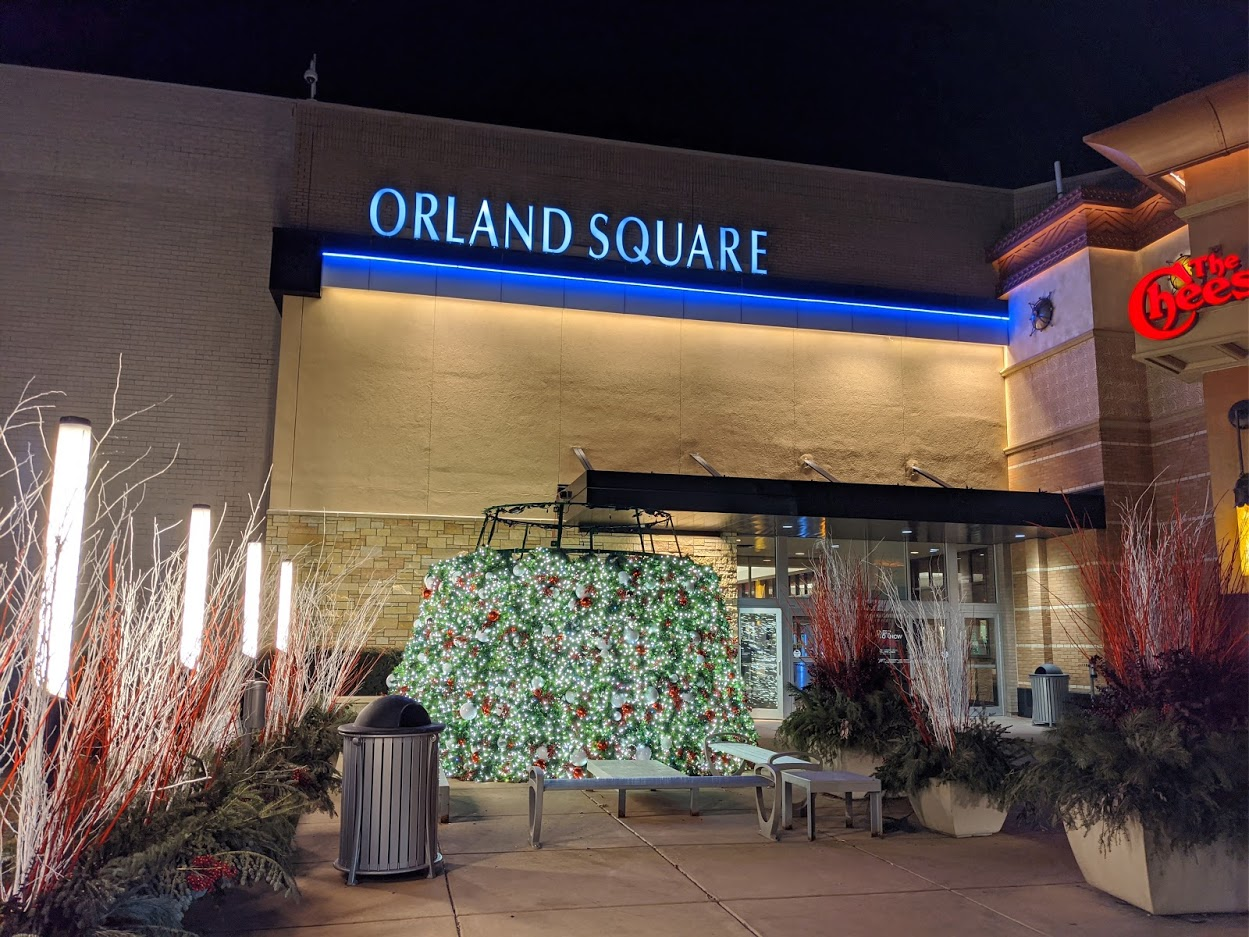
- The Orland Square Mall in January 2020
- Location: Orland Park, Illinois, United States
- Coordinates: 41.6198°N 87.84822°W
- Address: 288 Orland Square Dr, Orland Park, Illinois 60462
- Opened: March 15, 1976; 50 years ago
- Developer: Homart Development Company and Urban Investment & Development Company
- Manager: Simon Property Group
- Owner: Simon Property Group
- Architect: Skidmore, Owings & Merrill
- Num. of stores: 148
- Num. of anchor tenants: 3 (1 coming soon)
- Floor area: 1,229,884 sq ft (114,260.0 m^{2})
- Floors: 2 (3 in Macy's)
- Public transit: Pace
- Website: www.simon.com/mall/orland-square

Orland Square (also referred to as Orland Square Mall) is a shopping mall located in Orland Park, Illinois, United States. It is the second largest mall in the Chicago Southland, the south and southwest suburbs of Chicago, covering an area of 1,229,884 sq ft (114,260.0 m^{2}). It opened on March 15, 1976 and received major renovations in 1995. The mall features JCPenney, Macy's and Von Maur. Dick’s House of Sport is expected to open in the former Sears in 2029.

The mall has been a hub for commercial activity and development, driving dramatic growth in the surrounding area for the past 20 years. It serves as a major retail destination for the communities of Frankfort, Homer Glen, Mokena, New Lenox, Oak Forest, Orland Hills, Orland Park, and Tinley Park.

== History ==
Orland Square opened on March 15, 1976 with Marshall Field's and Sears. JCPenney would open on April 6, 1977 along with JCPenney's Fox Valley Center store. Lastly, Carson Pirie Scott opened on October 31, 1977. Skidmore, Owings & Merrill designed the mall. Construction was completed by the Inland-Robbins Construction Company.

On July 21, 1994, a fire destroyed the Buy The Weigh candy store. The next year, Orland Square would undergo a remodel.

On September 12, 2002, Hot Topic, which is located near JCPenney, opened to customers, six days before Woodfield Mall in Schaumburg opened. In 2006, Macy's took control of the Marshall Field's location upon being purchased from Federated Department Stores and May Company.

H&M opened in the Sears wing on November 12, 2004.

Half Price Books opened outside the mall on May 13, 2010. Ruby Tuesday closed in 2011.

Orland Square went under another renovation in 2012 that completely changed the image of the mall, with upgraded entrances, signs, floors, as well as lighting and expanded food court. Dave & Buster's opened a stand-alone location in the mall parking lot near the former Toys "R" Us on September 22, 2012. On December 5, 2012, Cheesecake Factory officially opened on the lower level by Macy's. In January 2013, Gap was introduced at the mall by Sears. On November 4, 2016, an entertainment center called Gizmo's Fun Factory opened along with Sky Zone Trampoline Park to the left of the nearby Carson's Furniture Gallery.

In January 2018, it was announced the Sears anchor store would close. The building was sold to Cubework, a provider of coworking spaces.

On April 18, 2018, it was announced that Carson's and its Furniture Gallery would be close, after the parent company went out of business. The Carson's anchor building was reconstructed for Von Maur, which opened November 2, 2019, a month after the Woodland Mall location in Kentwood, Michigan opened.

The same year Von Maur opened, Texas de Brazil would officially open on the upper level by the defunct Sears.

On August 20, 2020, Duluth Trading Company opened to the left of Half Price Books.

In 2025, it was announced that Dick’s Sporting Goods would be opening one of their large format Dick’s House of Sport stores in the former Sears. Construction is expected to begin in 2027 and be completed by 2029.

== Shooting ==
On January 21, 2019, a shooting occurred in the mall which left one person dead and one person wounded. At approximately 6:45 p.m. CST, 19-year-old Jakharr Williams opened fire near the food court. 18-year-old Javon Britton was killed, while a bystander was grazed during the gunfire. Two days after the shooting, Williams was arrested by police in Matteson, Illinois.

== Bus routes ==
Pace

- 364 159th Street
- 379 Midway/Orland Park
- 832 Joliet/Orland Square

== See also ==
- Cooper's Hawk Winery & Restaurants
- Parkview Christian Church
