= Hannah Keziah Clapp =

American teacher and activist

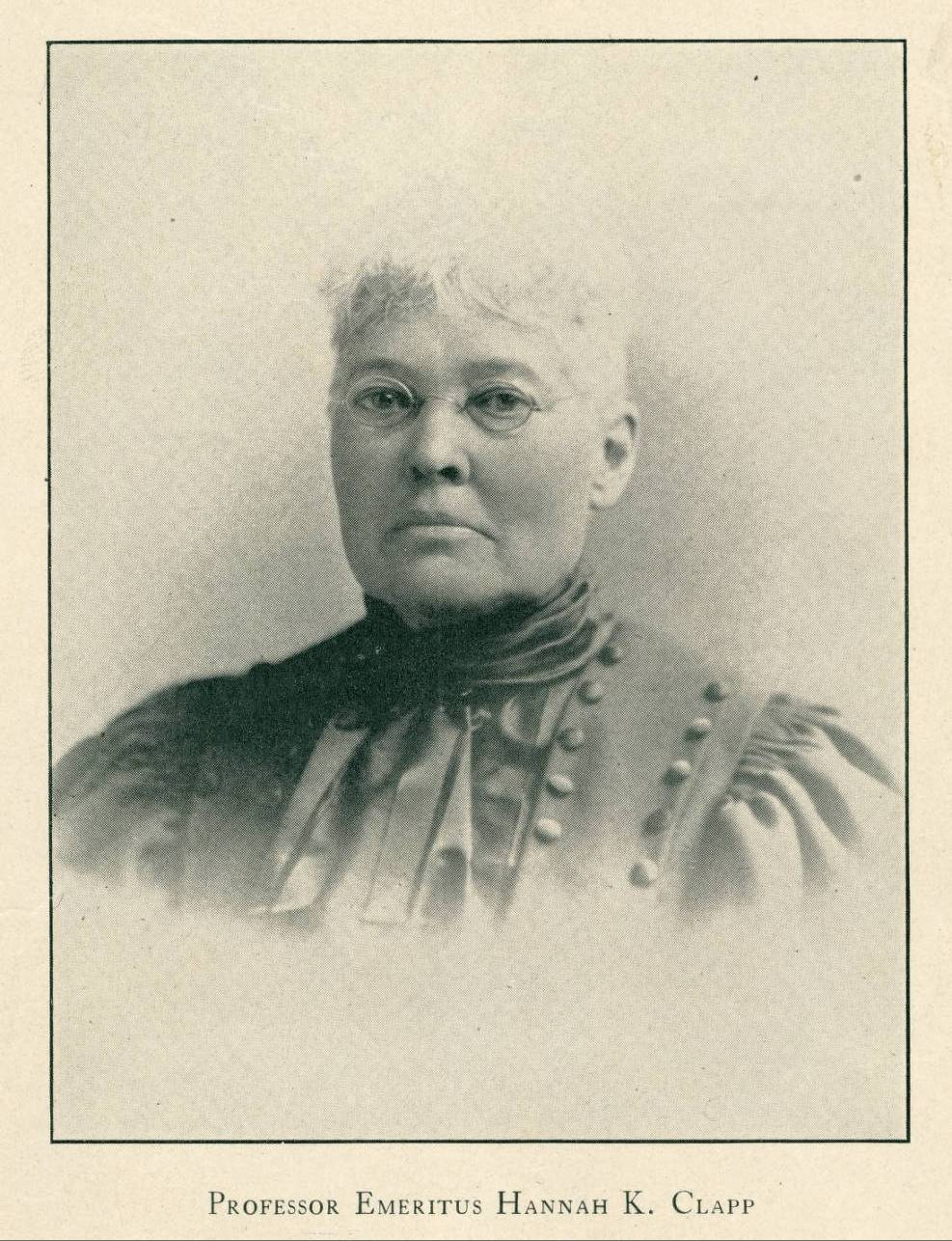
- Born: 1824; Albany
- Died: October 8, 1908 (aged 83–84)
- Occupation: Librarian, educator
- Employer: University of Nevada, Reno (1887–1901)

Hannah Keziah Clapp (1824 - October 8, 1908) was a teacher, activist and feminist in Nevada, US. She organized the state's first private school and was co-founder of the state's first kindergarten. She served as principal of the Lansing Female Seminary; taught at Michigan Female College; and was the first instructor and librarian at the University of Nevada, Reno. Clapp co-founded Reno's 20th Century Club, which in 1983 was added to the National Register of Historic Places listings in Washoe County, Nevada. She was born in Albany, New York in 1824, and arrived in Carson City in 1860, where she established the Sierra Seminary. A suffragette, Clapp also worked for women's right to vote. Clapp was a charter member of the Nevada Historical Society. She died in Palo Alto, California in 1908.
