= Mark Twain in Nevada =

1861–64 period in the American author's life

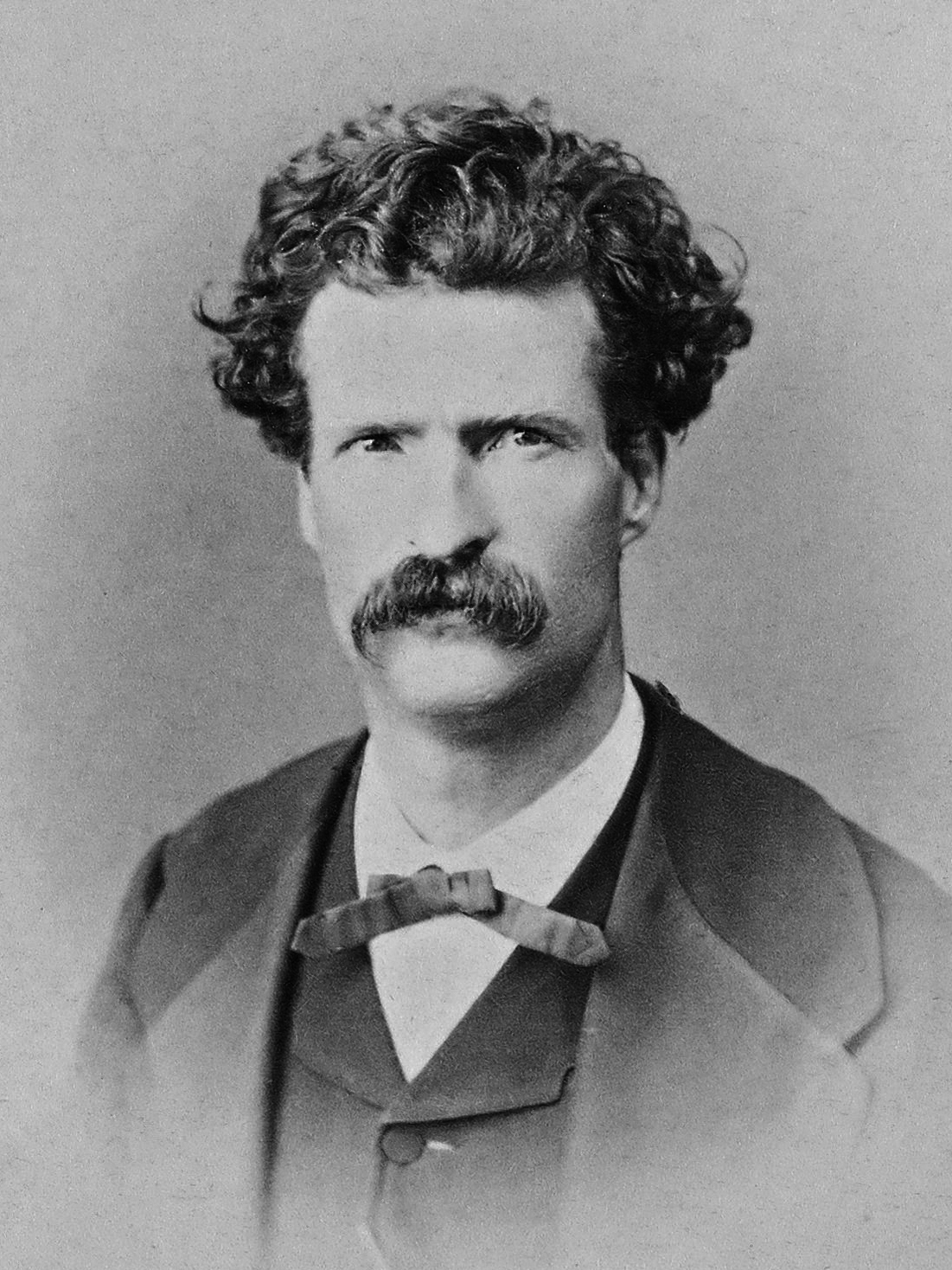
Mark Twain in 1867

The use of the pen name of Mark Twain first occurred in Samuel Clemens's writing while in the Nevada Territory which he had journeyed to with his brother. Clemens/Twain lived in Nevada from 1861 to 1864, and visited the area twice after leaving. Historians such as Peter Messent see Clemens's time in Nevada as "the third major formative period of Mark Twain's career" (after his time in Hannibal and upon the Mississippi) due to his encounters with "writers and humorists who would both shape and put the finishing touches on his literary art." The Routledge Encyclopedia of Mark Twain states that despite the few "disagreeable experiences" he had there, Twain "thrived in Nevada." Among those things he learned was "how far he could push a joke", a lesson learned from some "disagreeable experiences" he brought upon himself.

== Arrival ==
Having deserted the Marion Rangers (a small band of Confederate irregulars) due to a dislike of military life, Samuel Clemens was ready for a clean break with his past. He had lived in St. Louis for two weeks when he decided to accept his brother's offer that would provide this fresh start.

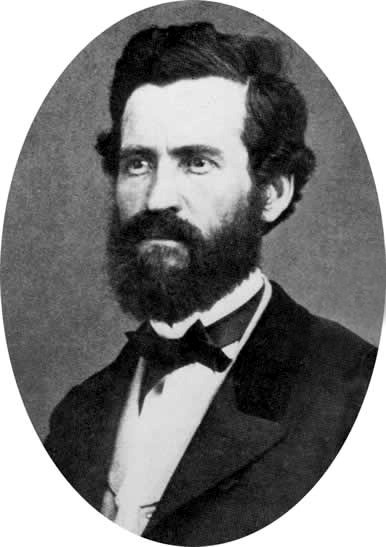
Orion Clemens

Samuel's brother Orion Clemens (who "had moved toward the position that slavery was morally wrong") had stumped for the presidential ticket of Abraham Lincoln in northern Missouri during the election of 1860 alongside St. Louis lawyer Edward Bates (whose law offices Orion had worked in during the 1840s). Lincoln made Bates his attorney general, and Bates recommended Orion to Secretary of State William H. Seward for a political appointment. This suggestion was accepted, and Orion was nominated by Lincoln to be secretary of the Nevada Territory on March 23, 1861 and was confirmed by the Senate on March 27, 1861. Despite a generous salary, no funds to relocate to Nevada were provided, and without the means to move, Orion struck a deal with Samuel that if he paid for their journey he would serve as Orion's private secretary. It was under this agreement that Samuel and Orion Clemens left for Carson City, Nevada on July 18, 1861 on an overland stagecoach leaving from St. Joseph, Missouri that would take 19 days to arrive. Each ticket was $150 (a month's wages from Orion's new job), Samuel paid the sum with money saved from when he was a riverboat pilot. The population of Carson City at the time was 2,000.

Despite the fact that the Nevada Directory for 1861-62 listed Samuel Clemens with the prestigious title of assistant secretary of state, the job could not maintain his interest. He felt that there was not enough writing in the job to keep both his brother and him busy. He also bristled at being underneath Orion's authority referring to him in his letters as "his majesty the Secretary".

== Lingering Southern sympathies ==
Samuel Clemens before the Civil War had considered joining the Know Nothings but joined the Constitutional Unionists made up of ex-Whigs who supported the Dred Scott decision (and won the majority of Southern border states in the election of 1860).

Historian Arthur G. Pettit points out that "Clemens rejected even the moderate Democratic candidate Stephen Douglas, who carried Clemens's own state. Clemens's Southernism, in other words, was a matter of conscious choice as well as regional background." Before the war Clemens held the Whig ideal of having both Union and slavery, but as things progressed he did not have any problem with the idea that states could secede if they felt aggrieved.

Pettit relates that, after Clemens's unhappy time in the irregular militia, he was glad to set out for Nevada rather "than to be at once a disloyal Northerner and a treasonous Southerner." Historian Louis J. Budd states that Clemens was hardly alone in escaping the war in this manner: "In fleeing west with his brother, Sam had plenty of company as, throughout the war years, many thousands of able-bodied men crossed the plains in the same direction."

Arriving in Nevada did not force Clemens to alter his convictions. While the territory was "aggressively dominated by Union men", there was a loud and well-organized Southern minority whose stronghold was in Virginia City (which had been named by Southerners). These supporters for Nevada secession even claimed victory in defeating a statehood proposal because it would allow entry to free blacks – calling the bills defeat the "slaughter of that free nigger Constitution". As time went on, and the war began to shift for the benefit of Union forces, the weight of popular opinion did as well, and Samuel Clemens soon had to take stock of where he stood on the matter.

== Mining ==
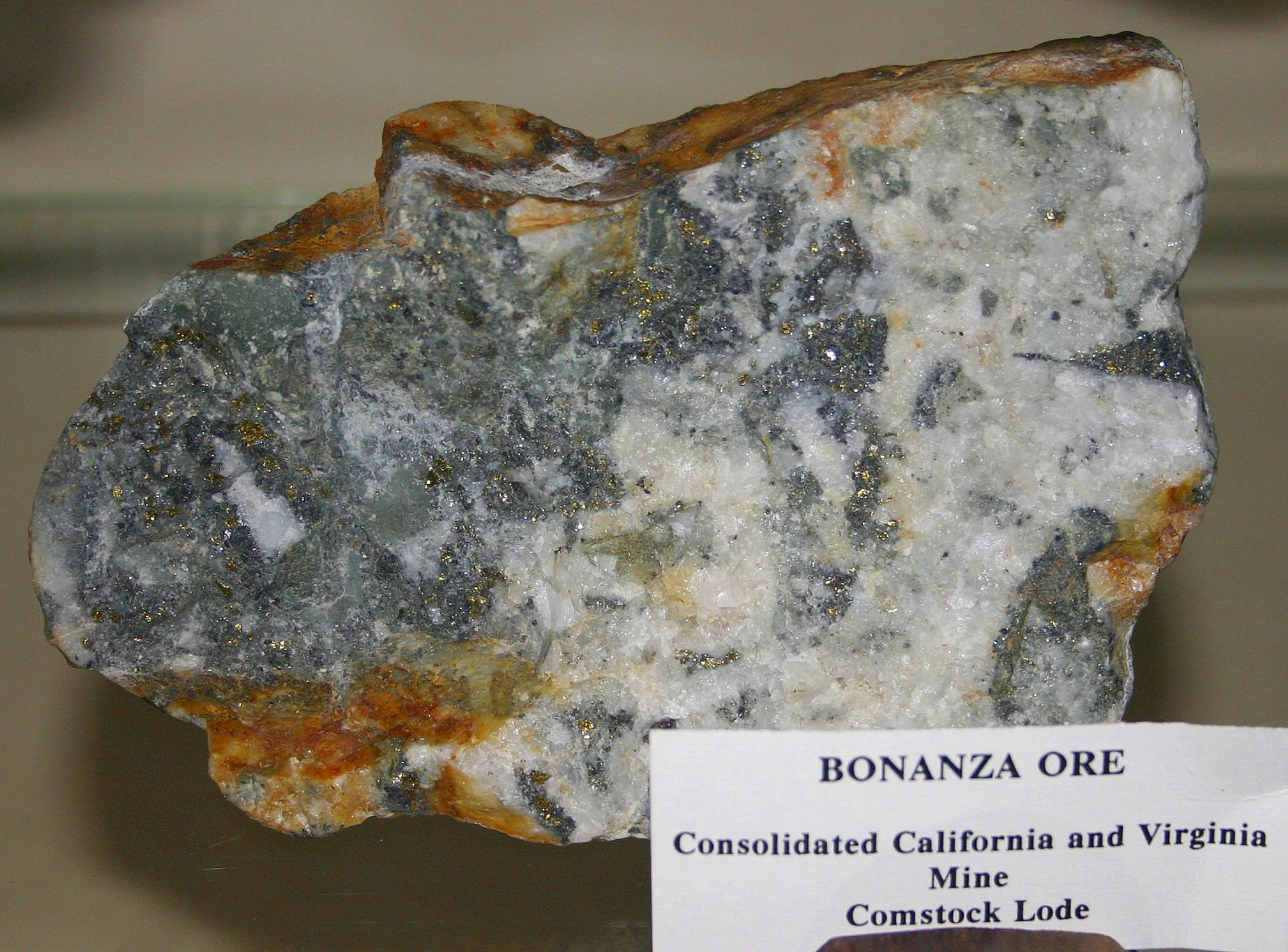
This Bonanza ore (from the Consolidated California and Virginia Mine, Comstock Lode) is an example of what Clemens mined.

After seeing silver ore emerge from one of the mills of the Comstock Lode, Samuel Clemens (tired of working under his brother) began to spend much of his time in the mining districts of Humboldt and Esmeralda. Some of the towns he had an extended connection with include Aurora and Unionville, Nevada (which had originally been named Dixie but had its name changed in 1861 after a close vote). In these areas, Clemens engaged in prospecting and working as a pocket miner with dreams of striking it rich. Clemens, working with an investment made by his brother Orion, took up several partners. Most notably was a partnership with Calvin Higbie (to whom the book Roughing It would be dedicated) and Robert Howland.

Despite great dreams of success, none of Clemens' efforts were overly successful. The rush of immigration to strip the area of silver had been ongoing since the spring of 1859, and Clemens' attempt to strike it rich was very late. By the time he began mining, amateur efforts to strike it rich were hardly viable, value of shares in mining outfits was beginning to collapse from over speculation, and lawyers mitigating disputes were viewed as the only ones sure to make a fortune.

In Roughing It, his stories about his time in Nevada and the West, Clemens and Higbe find a vein of silver that will make them millionaires and fill out the paperwork to make a legal claim, but they both get distracted and fail to do the upkeep necessary to keep the claim valid, and others are able to take it over and make fortunes. Historian R. Kent Rasmussen notes that there was a promising claim that the partners lost in 1862, and "Though their lost claim later proved valuable, it would not necessarily have made the men millionaires." Rasmussen holds that "He magnified the episode enormously" for comic effect.

Having found quartz-mining in search of silver difficult, and not finding enough to support himself, Clemens began working in a quartz mill shoveling tailings for small wages. He was unhappy with the work.

== Correspondent ==
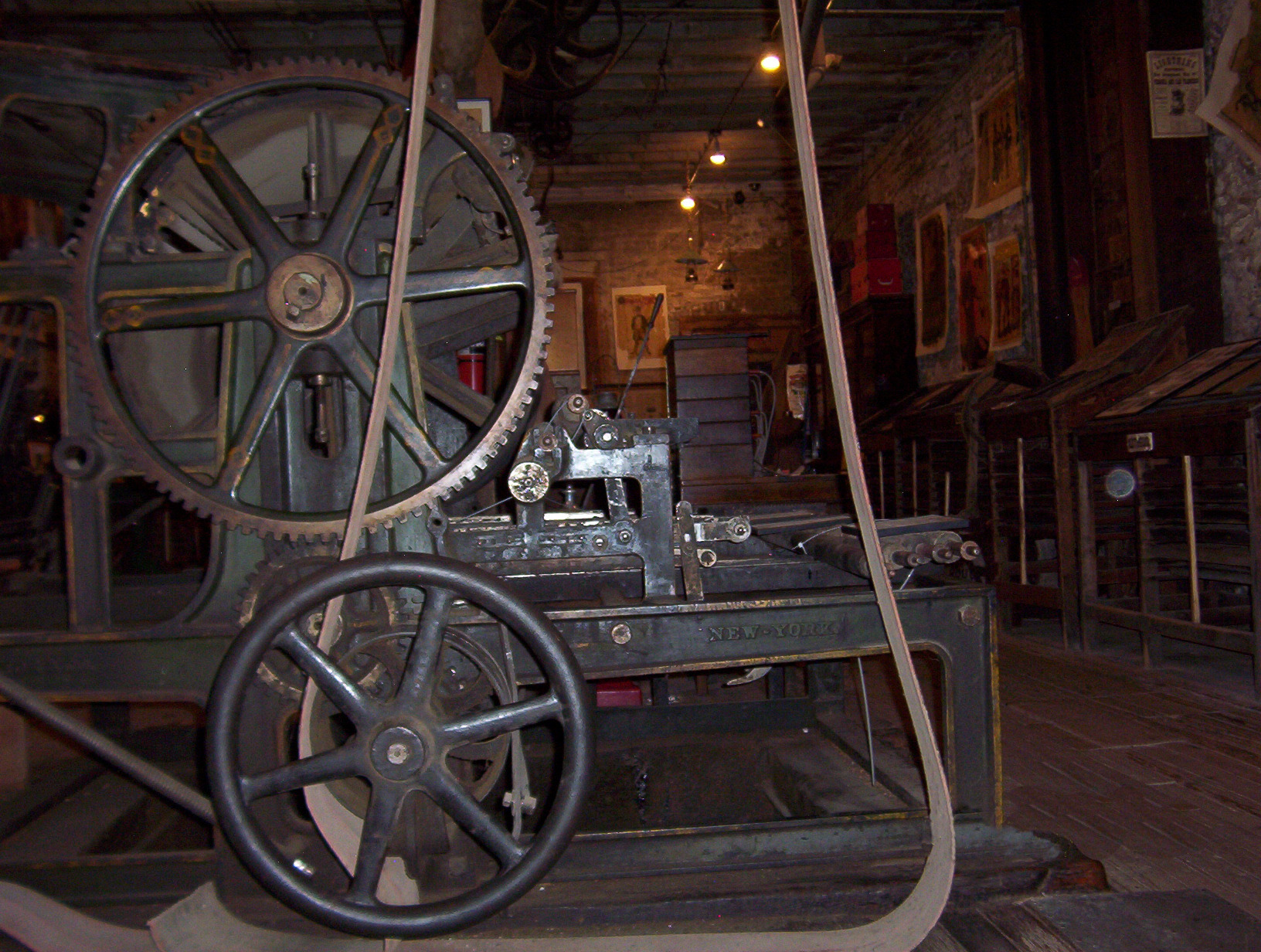
Antique printing press powered by flat-belt, overhead line shaft, preserved at the Mark Twain Museum at the Territorial Enterprise in Virginia City, NV

In February 1862, Samuel Clemens began to send occasional letters to the major paper in the Nevada Territory, the Virginia City Daily Territorial Enterprise. By July, he was asking Orion if he could assist him in finding a job as a correspondent. In the fall, he was offered $25 per week to become the city editor of the Enterprise. The offer to be an editor was more than he had anticipated, and he worried about his "inexperience and consequent unfitness for the position." Having been self-sufficient since he was 13 and worrying about falling into debt, Clemens accepted the job despite his worries.

The Territorial Enterprise was run by its founding editor Joseph T. Goodman who mentored Clemens in his new role as editor. Goodman and his staff had enjoyed Clemens's letters that he had signed as "Josh", especially one that satirized the oratory of the territory's chief justice. It also may have seemed advantageous to employ someone with connections to the government. Clemens began covering "vice, the mines, ghost stories, social functions, and other intrigues (sometimes imaginary) in his local columns" for the Enterprise. By December 1862, he was reporting on the territorial legislature and courts in Carson City.

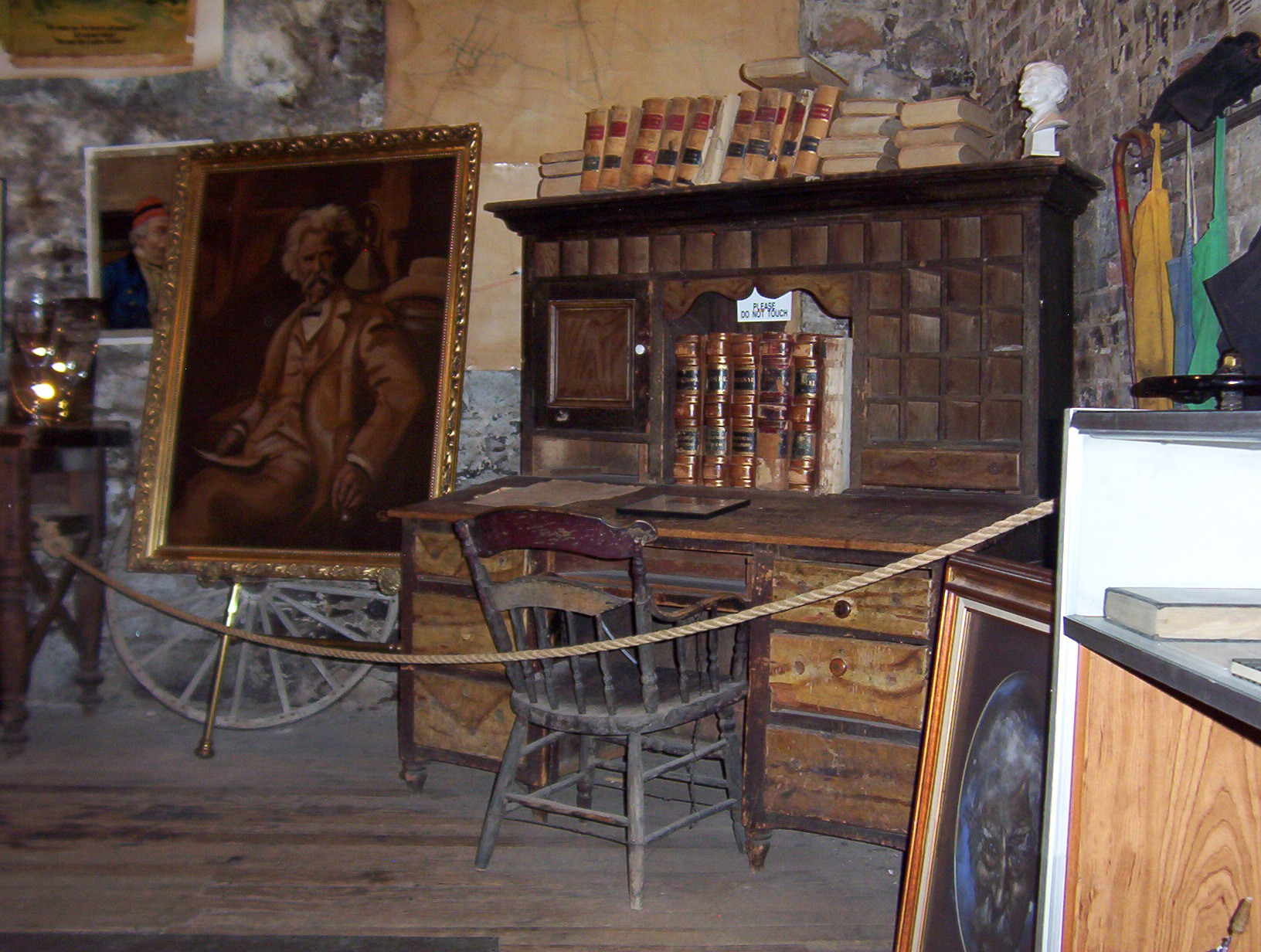
Mark Twain's editor's desk preserved at the Mark Twain Territorial Enterprise Museum, Virginia City, NV

One of his more popular pieces in 1862 was the unsigned "Petrified Man" in which Clemens claimed that a petrified man who had lived "close about a century ago" had been found "south of Gravelly Ford." Historian Bruce Michelson concludes Twain used this hoax to both ridicule the local politician Sewall and mock a public who through gullibility were too quick to accept a mass of petrification reports. The humorous story quickly was picked up by other newspapers and spread east.

In a letter dated February 3, 1863 to the Territorial Enterprise from Carson City, complaining about a lavish party that kept him "awake for forty-eight hours" Clemens signed his work "yours dreamily, MARK TWAIN", the first use of the name under which he would become famous. In May–June 1863, Twain made his first visit to San Francisco, travelling with Clement Rice – eating and drinking throughout the city and making important literary connections. He visited again, alone, in September. During this time, Twain often got his letters re-published in papers throughout the region, and near the end of 1863, began contributing to The Golden Era, a San Francisco literary journal.

=== Shifting sympathies ===
When Clemens came to Virginia City, he began boasting that he had been a first lieutenant in the regular Confederate Army. It was soon found out that he had been merely a second lieutenant in a self-organized militia of Missouri farm boys. Because of this boast, Clemens offended people on both side of the issue, including his brother's boss, Territorial Governor James W. Nye, who called him a "damned secessionist." Humboldt County judge G.T. Sewall swore he would whip Clemens for his sympathies if he ran across him. In a letter to his friend William H. Clagett, Clemens complained of the news that "they" (Union troops) had "thrashed" and defeated "our Missourians".

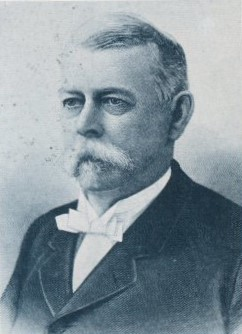
William H. Clagett received letters from Twain that indicate his shifting sympathies about the Civil War.

Clemens's behavior became an increasing embarrassment to his steadfastly loyal Republican brother Orion, as Samuel was seen as a disloyal troublemaker who spent too much time in saloons. Samuel Clemens's attitude began to change in 1862 as the general opinion became more heavily Union when the Northern armies began winning more battles. Clemens began to hedge his Confederate sympathies, and then abandoned them outright. By September 1862, in his letters to Clagett, he began to refer to the Union soldiers as "we".

The scrapbook Clemens kept while in Nevada initially was filled with newspaper articles that hailed secessionist opinions in the West, but by the end of 1862 he began pasting in editorials of leading citizens demanding that Orion purge the government of anyone with Southern sympathies. (Orion did fire a probate judge and notary public for this reason.) Samuel Clemens continued to collect articles about the results of people who expressed Southern sympathies that had just months before been tolerated. In July 1863, after a flag earlier planted on Mt. Davidson by Union supporters (to overlook Virginia City and mock its Southern sympathizers) survived an intense electrical storm, Clemens, now writing under his penname Mark Twain, presented its survival through the lightning strikes as a mystical omen of Union victory. With this, Twain publicly had shown his newly undivided devotion to the Union. He also portrayed an incident in San Francisco as an omen for the fall of the Confederate cause when all the lights suddenly went out at a meeting of Copperheads (Northern Democrats calling for immediate peace). Twain would go on to protest a clause in a proposed Nevada constitution to disfranchise any that voluntarily bore arms for the Confederacy, claiming that, even in his Missouri days, he always had an underlying affection for the Union.

Historian Arthur G. Pettit points out that Twain mentally would separate his Southern values from his Confederate values, for "When loyalty to the Confederacy proved a handicap in the face of shifting Western opinion—especially when it began to interfere with Clemens's main business in the West, which was to make money—it did not take him long to decide that dropping the Confederate South was a small price to pay…. Clemens was hardly the neophyte he made himself out to be in Roughing It."

=== The Third House ===
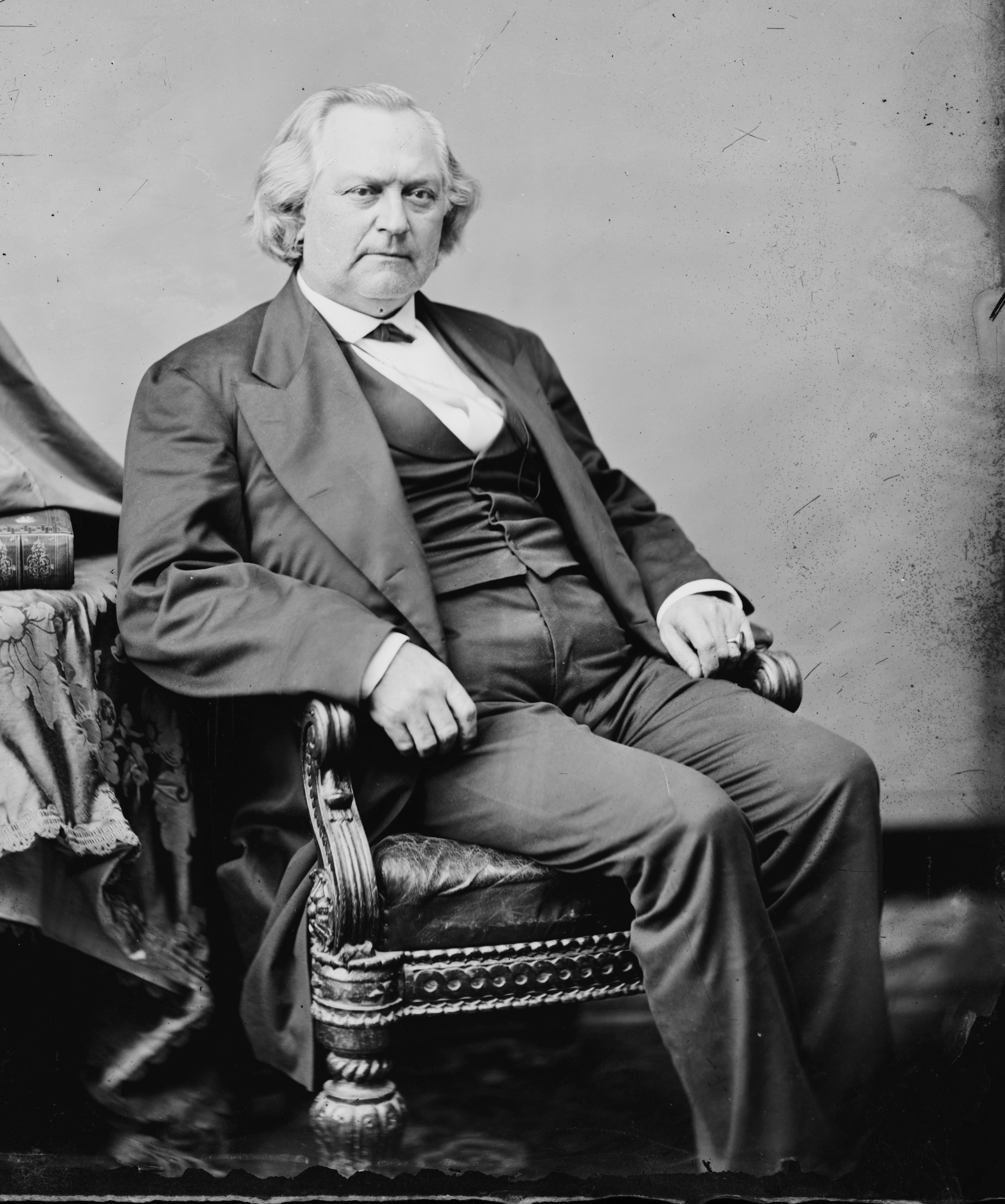
Territorial Governor James W. Nye was often on the receiving end of Twain's roasts when he led the satirical "Third House".

Twain's growing literary reputation and humor were celebrated by "the Third House" who were "an eccentric group of journalists, lawyers, bohemians and businessmen who mocked the legislative process." The group "was bawdy, raucous, and satirical". The Third House met after the adjournment of the actual territorial legislature, so elected legislators could join as well. Sessions were held anywhere from saloons to the First Presbyterian Church. The name mocked the two houses of the legislature of the territorial government while invoking the common term for journalism "the Fourth Estate" (a check on governments to keep them honest). The gatherings of the Third House were in the name of humor; it acted as "a burlesque legislature...with both politicos and their characteristic lingo the butt of the jokes." Because many members of government were present and prepared to be lampooned at the Third House, and as "drink flowed freely, the humor was rough and pointed." With Twain comedically roasting even politicians he respected, all to be repeated shortly in the pages of the Enterprise.

In December 1863, the members of the Third House elected Twain their "President of the Convention" as a jibe on the 1863 Nevada Constitutional Convention (working to make a state constitution, a necessary step to be granted statehood). Among those mocked by Twain was lawyer William Morris Stewart, a future U.S. senator and employer of Twain. This also served as a jibe on Territorial Governor James W. Nye, who was often outside the territory trying to gain supporters for Nevada statehood and his own political future. Nye's absences were covered by Orion Clemens acting in his stead, so electing Twain as the head of the Third House highlighted that his brother was forced to act as the head of the real government due to Nye's actions.

=== The Empire City Massacre Hoax ===
Twain's humor was not always appreciated, such as his hoax on October 28, 1863 called "A Bloody Massacre near Carson" (alternatively, the "Empire City Massacre Hoax"), purporting to detail the story of a man who loses "an immense amount in the Spring Valley Water Company of San Francisco" who in a deranged fit kills and scalps his wife and nine children. While the regular indicators were present that the piece was a joke, it was so bloody that it shocked the Enterprise readership and later caused the paper's trustworthiness to be brought into question. Other newspapers in the region, including the Gold Hill News and the San Francisco Bulletin, had picked up the story and presented it as factual. Despite Twain's retraction of the piece the next day, his critics held it against him for over a year. Many subscribers to the Enterprise canceled their subscriptions and turned to the Union, a rival newspaper The newspapers that had reprinted it were outraged, with the Bulletin demanding that Twain be fired. His offer to resign from the paper was refused by Joe Goodman, and his reputation continued to grow, some giving him the nickname the "Washoe Giant."

== Artemus Ward ==
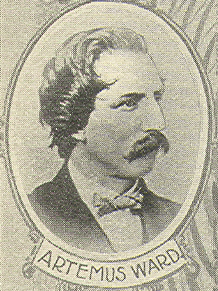
Artemus Ward's prolonged visit to Virginia City had a deep impact on Twain.

Twain attended many of the plays and entertainments that came to Virginia City and was invited to meet the famous actress Adah Isaacs Menken after a good review he wrote for her, but as the Routledge Encyclopedia of Mark Twain states: "Most importantly, he met Artemus Ward on his week-long visit to Virginia City in December 1863." This visit had a lasting impact on Twain. Ward had come to deliver a lecture but stayed for three weeks into January 1864, drinking, eating oysters, and engaging in roof walking on the buildings of hilly Virginia City with Twain, and his friends Joe Goodman, and Dan De Quille ("jumping from one roof down to another").

Twain formed a fast friendship with Ward who offered him advice on his career. Ward encouraged Twain to aim higher than being a western journalist, and promised to speak to the editors of the New York Sunday Mercury about his work. Ward told Twain "to work into the Eastern publications immediately" and sent a letter of introduction for him to the editor of the Mercury. Ward told Twain he should relocate to New York, where he was going himself. Twain declined the offer to travel east with Ward. (Thanks to Ward's assistance Twain was able to publish two stories in the Mercury in 1864, and due to his encouragement Twain would later send his story The Celebrated Jumping Frog of Calaveras County to New York in 1865 where it would become a national success.)

Despite Ward's early death in March 1867, The Mark Twain Encyclopedia states: "His style, manner, and mantle…[were] adopted by others, including especially Mark Twain. ...the attitudes and persona of Ward were influential on Twain's literary comedy in both general and specific ways."

== Political sway ==
In January 1864, Twain began covering another legislative session in Carson City. Thanks in part to his familial political connections, Twain's political reporting, though still in a humorous vein, raised his reputation in the eyes of his reading audience as an important figure in public affairs. His satire and social criticism was directed at matters of importance for the community. With his growing audience and influence, politicians wished to stay on his good side rather than be ridiculed in the Enterprise.

Historian Louis J. Budd points out that, while in later life, Twain "distorted the sober nature of this assignment [of covering the Legislature] by stressing the margin of irreverence with which he had carried it out" this was a comic recasting of reality. For while "His weekly letter for the Sunday trade was often playful and sometimes irresponsible. Day by day however he ground out factual accounts" with none of the comic color. Twain therefore "was deep in day to day realities" of how things got done in the Legislature and "he took side whenever possible".

Twain tried to use his influence to aid in the cause to move the capital of Nevada out of Carson City to Virginia City, a move favored by his employer as well. The boosters of Carson City argued against such a move, and both sides "used every fair or foul maneuver" they could to support their cause. Twain's printed work in the Enterprise not only made charges of graft, with identities of the accused thinly veiled, but his positions on other matters also were calculated to support the cause. As historian Louis J. Budd points out, "A neat example of how he shifted tactics as strategy demanded lies in his comments on a bill to grant twenty thousand dollars to the Sierra Seminary, a private school in Carson City with about forty students. On January 14, 1864, he held that the 'money could not be more judiciously expended'; on February 16 he called the school 'a private affair,' hinted at boodling [political graft and fraud], and suggested support for a public mining college instead; on April 25 he had the gall to refer to the Sierra Seminary bill as a 'really worthy measure.'" The capital remained in Carson City, but Twain's treatment of the Sierra Seminary would come back later to haunt him.

== Death of niece ==
On January 29, 1864, Twain's niece Jennie (born in 1855) fell ill to spotted fever. Twain, who was very close to the girl, had recently visited her class and written an article about it entitled "Miss Clapp's School"; he would later use the memories of this visit in his book The Adventures of Tom Sawyer. Twain, still in Carson City to cover the legislature, joined with his sister-in-law Mollie and his brother Orion at Jennie's bedside, continuously praying with the feverish girl. On February 1, 1864 at 6 p.m., she died when the disease progressed into meningitis. Twain and her parents had remained at her bedside. On February 3, the territorial legislature adjourned to attend the funeral. Orion and Mollie never had another child, and a general depression helped cause his political decline. Twain was grief-stricken over the loss, and remained bitter over it for the rest of his life. At the time, he directed his anger at the profession of undertakers, using his writing to claim they were corrupt. He continued to slam the profession for years to come. While Twain wanted to help Orion with his grief, he could not endure his brother's attempts to father him.

== The Sanitary Affair ==
As Nevada was still a territory at this time, Twain's newspaper writing covered a political scene that was especially charged, as the regional government "had the delicate task of overseeing the transition to statehood at a time when other states were attempting to secede" during the Civil War. In this atmosphere, Twain's often satirical writing was seen as disloyal to the Union by people of influence, as "allying himself with the 'Peace Democrats' and the George B. McClellan ticket in 1864".

Twain printed an especially poorly received piece of satire at the same time that he involved himself in an increasingly serious war of words, insults, and challenges with the editor of a competing paper. These coinciding incidents occurred in mid-1864 with both involving community fundraising for sanitary commissions (groups raising money for the care of wounded Union soldiers). The efforts were intended to send the money to the St. Louis Sanitary Fair that was occurring later that spring which was backed by the soon-to-be general of the Union Army Ulysses S. Grant and Frederick Law Olmsted. Twain received circulars about the fair from Pamela Moffett, and he wrote pieces for the Enterprise and the San Francisco Morning Call encouraging fundraising efforts for the event.

=== The Great Austin Flour Sack ===
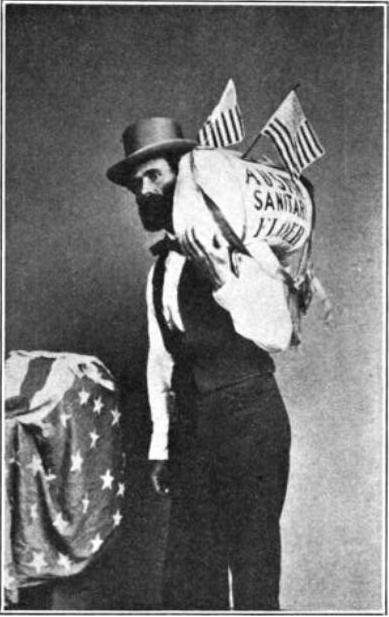
Reuel Colt Gridley and his famous sack of flour

One campaign to raise funds for the sanitary commission was run by Twain's friend Mexican–American War veteran and grocer Reuel Colt Gridley, whom he had known from his school days in Hannibal. The campaigning centered on a flour sack that Gridley carried around from town to town throughout the region. Individuals, groups, and towns would "bid"/donate to the "purchase" of the flour sack trying to out-contribute/"bid" each other, solely for the purpose of civic pride and "the pleasure of outbidding one's rivals, and in the briskly competitive West, this proved a clever incentive to pry open people's pocketbooks." Gridley always maintained possession of the sack and would bring it with him to his next stop in the region.

The flour sack had originally been part of a bet between Gridley and H.S. Herrick of the town of Austin, Nevada. While Gridley supported the Democratic party, his opponent supported the Republican party. The bet was over whose party's candidate would win the mayoral election. Gridley was running as the Democratic candidate and said that, if he lost, he would carry the sack on his back through town with a brass band playing John Brown's Body behind him, but if Herrick's candidate lost, Herrick would carry the sack with the band playing Dixie. After Gridley lost and held up his part of the bet, Herrick told him he did not want the flour, and it was decided that it should be auctioned with the funds going to the sanitary commission. The winner of the first series of bids refused to take possession of the sack and instructed that he auction it again, to which he complied with the situation repeating itself into the night. Other communities learning of the event invited Gridley to "auction" the sack at their town, which Gridley did, making his own traveling fundraising campaign for the sanitary commission.

On May 15, Gridley proceeded to Virginia City. Despite the size of the city (due to its populace being unprepared for his arrival and the lateness in the day when the "auction" started) less was raised than in the village of Austin. Gridley was convinced to stay overnight and the boosters of the sanitary commission made arrangements for greater publicity. The next day, Gridley was driven through Virginia City in an open carriage being led in a parade of city notables in their own carriages and accompanied by musical bands. Despite gathering a crowd, the procession left them in the dust and moved onto nearby villages. The citizens of Virginia City were directed to a public bulletin board being used to record the updates of what their neighbors contributed in an effort to goad civic rivalry.

Twain went out with other reporters to catch up to Gridley and record the events meeting the procession at its first village stop of Gold Hill. He spent the day with Gridley's writing two long pieces for the Enterprise about the events. The sack then traveled to Silver City, Dayton and then was turned around to head back to Virginia City. The citizens of Virginia City were now clamoring to beat the amount raised by the smaller towns (having failed to previously). The growing enthusiasm was not limited to the people of Virginia City because, on his way back, Gridley was forced to stop again at Silver City and Gold Hill and let the towns bid again before proceeding to return to Virginia City.

=== Miscegenation hoax ===
With the local focus on fundraising for the Sanitary Commission, Twain decided to write a piece of satire that combined the story of the progress of the Great Austin Flour Sack with the events surrounding a May 5, 1864 Carson City fancy-dress ball held by prominent society ladies (including Mollie Clemens) to raise funds for the same purpose.

The committee for the Sanitary Ball had held a debate about whether to send the funds raised to the Western Sanitary Commission of St. Louis or the U.S. Sanitary Commission of New York. Some members of the Ball committee did not like the idea of sending money to the St. Louis organization as a portion of the funds would be given to support the Freedmen's Aid Society. Twain learned of the debate either from his sister-in-law Mollie or his brother Orion.

On May 16, 1864 with editor Joe Goodman out of town Twain's unsigned piece (entitled the "Grand Ball at Los Angeles Plata") made its way into the hands of the printer for the Enterprise and appeared in the paper on May 17. The piece asked why the Great Austin Flour Sack had not been taken to Carson City to raise funds there; it claimed "that the reason the Flour Sack was not taken from Dayton to Carson was because it was stated that the money raised at the Sanitary Fancy Dress Ball, recently held in Carson for the St. Louis Fair, had been diverted from its legitimate course, and was to be sent to aid a Miscegenation Society somewhere in the East; and it was feared the proceeds of the sack might be similarly disposed of." The piece added cryptically that the claim was "a hoax, but not all a hoax, for an effort is being made to divert those funds from their proper course."

There was already a worry around collections for the Sanitary Fund; that they might be fraudulently collected and not being used for their stated purpose. Such suspicions even fell upon Reuel Gridley the organizer of Flour Sack fund drive, this despite the fact that his efforts were leaving him destitute. Even with such worries, it was Twain's use of the term "miscegenation" that made his statement so controversial. Despite the strong support of the idea that the Union must be preserved to preserve democracy itself, the idea of racial equality and sexual relations with members of a different race was seen as outrageous in Nevada as it was throughout most of the Union. At the time Nevada had a law fining "Cohabitation with Indians, Chinese, or Negroes" prescribing fines between 100 and 500 dollars or imprisonment from one to six months. Historian Ron Powers writes "The Emancipation Proclamation was less than two years old in the spring of 1864…Sentiment toward Negros, even on the "emancipating" side, was saturated with animosity, superstition, sexual fears and resentment: the liberators would soon have to compete with former slaves for work. Union-"secesh" tensions rippled through Washoe; fights erupted, shootings occurred over the question. Even though Union sympathy prevailed, few people accepted the notion that Negroes were equal to whites. Many pro-Union whites still resented black slaves for having made the war inevitable."

The term "miscegenation" had only recently been coined by Copperheads. The term first appeared in a pamphlet fraudulently claiming to be written by Lincoln supporters and crafted to try and discredit him during his bid for re-election. By the time of Twain's own miscegenation comment the fact that the pamphlet was a hoax was publicly known, "and Clemens used the term knowing its connections to Copperheadism."

Historian Joe B. Fulton points out that Twain's miscegenation comment was printed during the tense run up to the November 1864 elections. Fulton quotes Major G.W. Ingalls who recorded that at this time Lincoln's supports called the other side "traitors, 'secesh' [secessionists], and 'copperheads'" and the McClellan's supporters calling their opponents "'black Republicans,' 'abolitionists,' and 'nigger worshippers'". Twain would later claim that he had been intoxicated when he wrote the piece, but historian Fulton states "his article is best understood in the context of election year Copperhead hoaxes and of his own early efforts such as "A Bloody Massacre Near Carson", "Petrified Man", and his reporting for the Third House."

Historian James Melville Cox points out that by being willing to bring the Sanitary Fund's reputation into question and linking it to miscegenation this was a "somewhat "confederate" accusation...revealing that Mark Twain's humor still showed a native if not a partisan Southern cast." Historian Arthur G. Pettit states that in Twain's shift to support the Union "He was probably relieved to learn that coming down on the winning side did not require revision of his views about black people. Nevada Territory, like most of the West and the North, was anti-black as well as antislavery and enjoyed the usual nigger jokes. With his Southern background, vernacular skill, and tendency to search out off-color subject matter, Mark Twain was quickly attracted to this kind of humor. …The most notorious example was the so-called Sanitary Fund episode, probably the most damaging incident of Mark Twain's Western career." Historian Louis J. Budd also holds Twain's "latent Southern racism made possible his fatally clumsy wisecrack that local money for the Sanitary Fund would go to a "miscegenation society."

Historian Ben Tarnoff writes "Twain had located a sore spot in the collective psyche" the idea of sexual relations between the races "wasn't simply taboo; it also tapped an anxiety about the ultimate aim of the Civil War. …When Twain joked that the money meant for the Sanitary Commission would instead be used for miscegenation, he articulated an awful fear festering in white minds throughout the Union: that the war would result in full equality for blacks, who would soon be taking white jobs, white land, white women."

The Routledge Encyclopedia of Mark Twain points out that as miscegenation was seen as a sexual vice and "provided tempting material for smutty humor, and in the earlier stages of his career Twain, not yet the vocal champion of racial justice he would become, tended to approach the subject of interracial liaisons with a measure of virile bawdry…It was a crude suggestion that the proceeds of the ladies' charity ball were to be used to fund a 'miscegenation Society'". Historian Ron Powers points out "Like his mother, the youthful Sam could be racially callous in the abstract--as in his miscegenation slur--but he could never stand the sight of racial cruelty." While Twain wrote the piece as a harmless joke, he would soon find out that the ladies of the Ball and their supporters took the matter with deadly seriousness.

Historian Stephanie LeMenager notes that by linking "the local women's fear of fiscal contamination by the Freeman's Society" to fear of a contamination by miscegenation "the hoax makes Carson City, Nevada, the first staging ground for Mark Twain's disruption of American racial manners."

=== Contribution rivalry ===
On May 17, 1864, the same day that Twain's unsigned miscegenation hoax was appearing in the Enterprise, he wrote about the progress of the Great Austin Flour Sack when it was brought to be "auctioned" once again at Virginia City.

With the sack again in Virginia City, Twain accompanied Gridley to observe the proceedings. Twain recorded that the second "auction" lasted two and a half hours, and "a population of fifteen thousand souls had paid in coin for a fifty-pound sack of flour a sum equal to forty thousand dollars in greenbacks! …The grand total would have been twice as large, but the streets were very narrow, and hundreds who wanted to bid could not get within a block of the stand, and could not make themselves heard. …This was the greatest day Virginia [City] ever saw, perhaps."

That night Twain wrote a letter to his mother and sister from the offices of the Virginia City Territorial Enterprise. He told them that there was a competition between his paper and the Virginia City Daily Union to "outbid" each other for the sack. He said he had strict orders from "the proprietors always to 'go them a hundred better'", and his paper was in the lead when he left to file his report. He had gotten word that a representative of the Union had returned and increased their bid by a hundred dollars. He wrote, "It was provoking. …But I guess we'll make them hunt their holes yet, before we are done with them."

The piece Twain filed that night appeared on May 18, under the title "Travels and Fortunes of the Great Austin Sack of Flour." At the time, the paper's editor Joe Goodman was away and had put Twain in charge. With no oversight Twain felt free to goad his paper's rivals, publishing his unsigned letter asking, "How Is It?—While we had no representative at the mass meeting on Monday evening, the UNION overbid us for the flour…we are told that the Union (or its employees, whichever it is,) has repudiated the bid. We would like to know about his matter, if we may make so free". If the piece was supposed to be a joke, the staff of the Union were not amused and would soon be letting Twain know of their displeasure.

Historian Louis J. Budd points out that previously Twain was "usually following the line marked out by the Enterprise editorials…[while] he crisply judged the factional moves within the Union party", but by the time of Twain's remarks about the Daily Union, "Nevadans [had] started drifting away from Union party harmony and toward Democratic and Republican poles" with the Daily Union and Enterprise in opposition to each other.

=== Editorial troubles ===
While Twain was calling the honor of the staff of the Union into question in the May 18, 1864 issue of the Enterprise, the president, vice president, treasurer, and secretary of the Sanitary Ball committee sent a letter to his paper denouncing his article as "a tissue of falsehoods…made for malicious purposes." When it arrived at the Enterprise, Joe Goodman having returned decided to ignore the letter in hopes that the uproar would defuse of its own accord. Just as he did during the fallout from Twain's "A Bloody Massacre near Carson" hoax, Goodman continued to stand by Twain.

The Union responded to Twain's piece wondering if they had rescinded their donation by publishing their own angry letter (presumably written by its co-owner and editor James L. Laird) on May 19 entitled "How Is It? – How It Is" signed "Printer." It was full of harsh words for Twain's piece, saying, "Such an item could only emanate from a person whose employer can find in his services a machine very suitable to his own manliness." The piece also accused Twain of dealing in "Unmanly public journalism." Historian Jerome Loving points out that Twain's problems in Virginia City occurred when he was acting editor-in-chief for an absentee, mirroring the difficulties he got himself into when working in Hannibal for Orion's newspaper and publishing a controversial piece mocking the editor of a rival paper (resulting in a situation that would've ended in a duel except for Twain's youth).

On May 20, 1864, the same day as his final piece about the travels of the Flour Sack appeared in a piece that was picked up by San Francisco Bulletin (as the campaign had indeed moved to Carson City before widening its sights to include California), the angry letter from the ladies of the Sanitary Ball of Carson City arrived at the Enterprise. Now aware of the mounting opposition to him in Carson City, Twain wrote his sister-in-law Mollie Clemens.

==== Letter to Mollie ====
Mollie, still grieving over the death of her only child, had found herself ostracized from Carson City society, as the ladies had figured out that Twain was the author of the miscegenation hoax. Historian Ron Powers points out that Twain wrote an anguished letter to Mollie "not to apologize for the mortification he'd caused, nor to promise that he would assume public responsibility. He was preoccupied with the damage that the committee women's letter could do to him." Twain told Mollie that he "had nothing but trouble & vexation since the Sanitary trip, & now this letter comes to aggravate me a thousand times worse. It if were from a man, I would answer it with a [dueling] challenge, as the easiest way of getting out of a bad scrape, although I know I am in the wrong & would not be justified in doing such a thing."

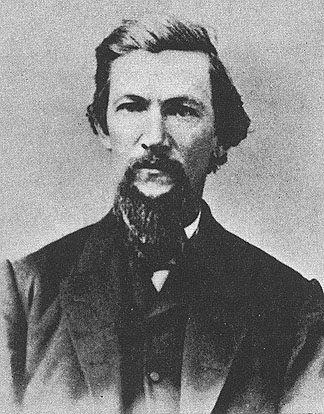
Dan DeQuille questioned the wisdom of Twain publishing the hoax.

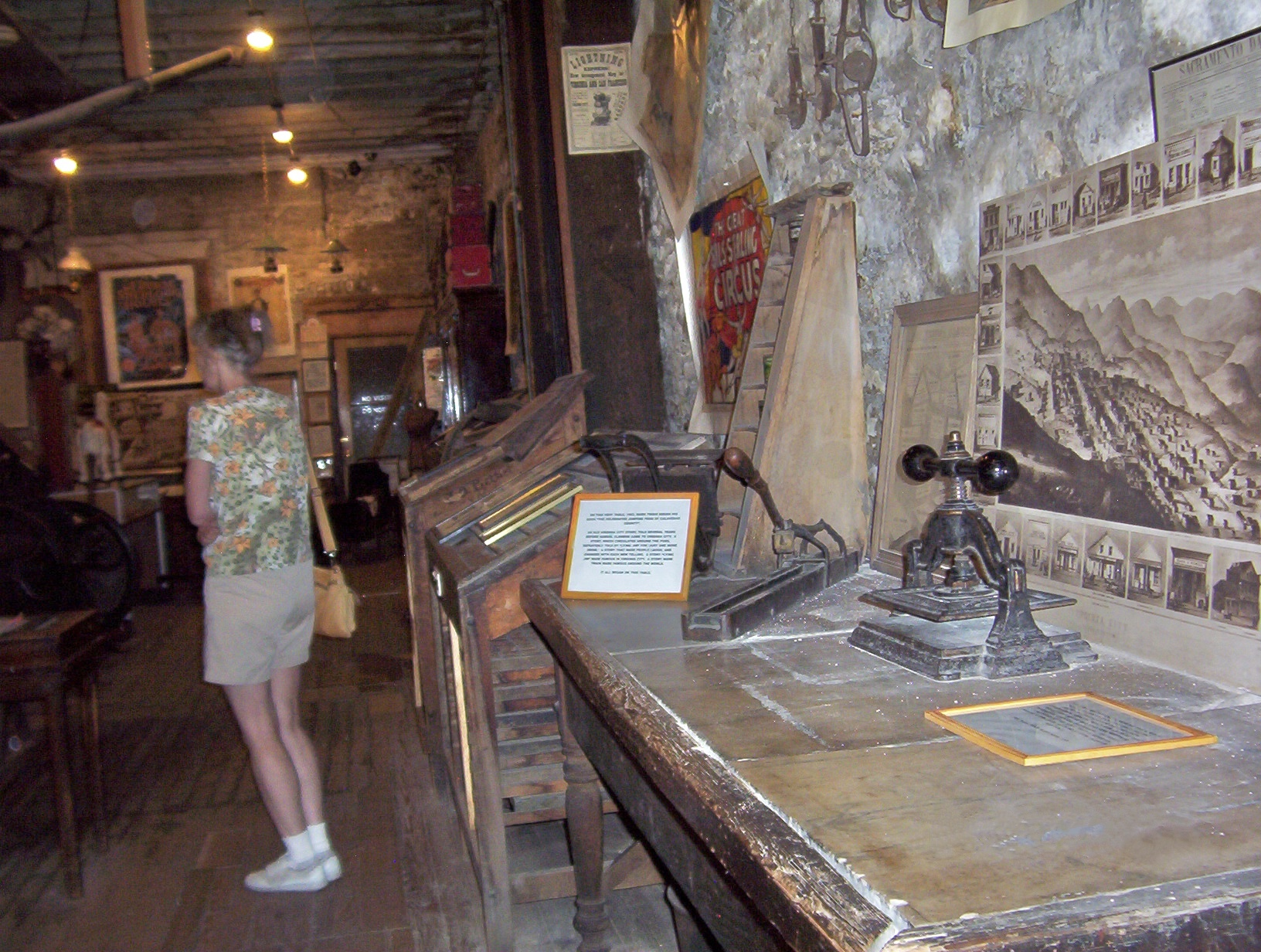
The composing table of the Territorial Enterprise preserved at the Mark Twain Territorial Enterprise Museum in Virginia City, NV

In the letter, Twain admitted he wrote "the squib" but claimed he had heard the "rumor" at the auction when it was "said in drunken jest" by people he refused to name. He told Mollie he "was not sober" when he wrote the piece and presented it at the Enterprise to Dan De Quille (the pen name of William Wright). De Quille looked it over and asked "Is this a joke?" When told it was, De Quille said "he would not like such a joke as that to be perpetrated upon him, & that it would wound the feelings of the ladies of Carson. He asked me if I wanted to do that, & I said, 'No, of course not.'" Twain had placed the piece on the editing table and he and De Quille forgot about it as they made plans and then proceeded to the theater. Twain theorized that it was found by the foreman of the printing press while looking to see if there was a further copy to print. The foreman seeing that the piece was not only about "the Sanitary spree" surrounding the Flour Sack, but was written in the hand of the acting editor in chief, so he published it without Twain's knowledge. As he did not bother to read the Enterprise every day, Twain told Mollie he had no knowledge that the piece had made the paper until the paper received the angry reply from the ladies of Carson City. Twain told Mollie he was stuck and unable to do anything to resolve the situation, for he could not admit "that I & all concerned were drunk. No—I'll die first." He asked Mollie to "Either satisfy those ladies that I dealt honorably by them when I consented to let Dan suppress that article…or else make them appoint a man to avenge the wrong done them, with weapons in fair & open field. They will understand at a glance that I cannot submit to the humiliation of publishing myself a liar".

==== Protocol for a duel ====
The next day, May 21, 1864, Virginia City's Union editor Laird let loose again, saying Twain "had no gentlemanly sense of professional propriety" conveying with "every word, and in every purpose of all his words, such a groveling disregard for truth, decency and courtesy, as to seem to court the distinction only of being understood as a vulgar liar." Laird said Twain was one of those men who "prefers falsehood; whose instincts are all toward falsehood; whose thought is falsification; whose aim is vilification through insincere professions of honesty". That afternoon Twain formally challenged Laird to a duel. Twain who had begun carrying a pistol again sent Laird a note, verifying that he was the author of the piece the Union railed against, and demanded he publicly retract his paper's "insulting" response. Historian Roy Jr. Morris states that "although he could scarcely hold a pistol in his hand without threatening to shoot himself in the foot, he felt honor-bound to reply in kind to Laird's inflammatory words."

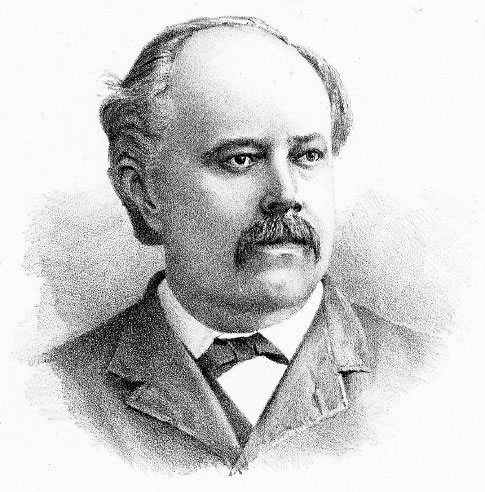
Thomas Fitch, previous editor for the Virginia Daily Union, had been recently crippled in a duel with the editor of the Enterprise.

Laird was incensed to receive such a demand from Twain, from (as historian Ron Powers puts it) "the reigning loudmouth of Washoe, still infamous from the Carson massacre hoax". This was especially irritating as eight months earlier the regular Enterprise editor-in-chief Joe Goodman had gotten into a heated war of printed words with one of Laird's Union editors (Thomas Fitch) and crippled his knee in a pistol duel at Stampede Valley. Throughout that day and into the night private correspondence traveled between the Union and the Enterprise addressing the issue of insulted dignity and proceeded further along in the protocol towards a formal duel. J.W. Wilmington a printer for the Union and a war veteran who had seen action at the Battle of Shiloh wrote Twain claiming it was he not Laird who had written the piece that threw Twain's manhood into question. Twain ignored this and wrote back to Laird "...any further attempt to make a catspaw of any other individual and thus shirk a responsibility that you had previously assumed will show that you are a cowardly sneak. I now peremptorily demand of you the satisfaction due to a gentleman--without alternative." Laird responded saying "Mr. Wilmington has a prior claim upon your attention. When he is through with you, I shall be at your service." He also accused Twain of a "groveling disrespect for truth, decency, and courtesy." Twain responded, writing "...[I]f you do not wish yourself posted as a coward, you will at once accept my peremptory challenge, which I now reiterate." Historian Fred Nixon points out the escalation Twain invoked by his choice of words, "Whereas the first challenge was an 'alternative' challenge, which could be satisfied by an apology, this one [a peremptory challenge] could be satisfied only on the field of honor."

Twain passed Wilmington's letter to his friend and Enterprise printer Mississippi-born Steve Gillis. Despite being under five feet tall and weighing only 95 pounds, Gillis had a scary reputation as a saloon brawler. Gillis acting as Twain's dueling second, wrote Wilmington saying "A contemptible ass and coward like yourself should only meddle in the affairs of gentlemen when called upon to do so." Wilmington begged off saying that he "had written the communication only in defense of the craft, and did not desire a quarrel with a member of that craft".

==== Letter to Ellen Cutler ====
While still awaiting satisfaction from Laird, Twain tried to repair the damage done to the feelings of the ladies of the Carson City Sanitary Fair. On May 23, 1864 Twain wrote to Ellen G. (Mrs. William K.) Cutler, a signer of the letter blasting the author of the miscegenation hoax. He apologized for not responding sooner to the letter as it "came at a moment when I was in the midst of what ought to have been a deadly quarrel with the publishers of the Union". Mrs. Cutler was the only one among the Carson City society ladies that had not ostracized Mollie Clemens, for which Twain thanked her. Twain promised that he would "say a word or two to show the ladies that I did not wilfully and maliciously do them a wrong."

==== A public "retraction" and escalation ====
Trying to put an end to the problems caused by the Miscegenation hoax, on May 24, 1864 Twain published a round-about unsigned apology in the Enterprise. Historian Ron Powers quotes portions of the letter in a summary of the piece indicating Twain's attempt to defuse responsibility for the piece: "yes, 'we' published a rumor, and yes, it was a hoax, but 'we' stated as much, 'And it was—we were perfectly right.' 'We' were sorry for the 'misfortune,' and 'we venture to apologize for it,' and so on."

That same day having received no response from Laird that satisfied his wounded dignity, Twain also published all of their private correspondence over the matter in the Enterprise. In the now publicly printed correspondence and in an afterword following it Twain called Laird "putrid,..grovleing, vulgar liar", an "ass", inflicted by such a condition through "general principles" and from "natural instinct". Laird's correspondence called Twain "a liar, a poltroon, and a puppy" and called into question his war conduct. Twain demanded Laird's "craven carcass" apologize at once for being an "unmitigated liar" or give him "the satisfaction due to a gentleman." In the following days papers from around the territory reprinted the letters, some mocking the originator of the bloody Carson Massacre hoax for getting himself into a situation that would end with his own blood. Historian James Melville Cox puts forward that the newspaper audience aware that there was a law against dueling in the Territory (one that was not strictly enforced), likely saw the "journalistic invective…[as] one legal way of retaining the satisfaction of a forbidden ritual…[with] the bombastic exchange of published threats and challenges promising a duel…[as] a burlesque of the duel itself. Thus the 'publication' provided amusement for Enterprise readers", similar to Twain's political burlesques as head of the Third House.

Historian Ron Powers sees Twain's behavior concerning Laird not as burlesque but as "dark, deadly stuff", "reckless", and "downright suicidal". Powers holds that Twain had not blundered along into increasing trouble but that "This was apparently what Sam was looking for: an excuse to unleash the defining ritual of southern manhood, the code duello. …Sam seems to have viewed dueling as a kind of hovering fate, onerous but inevitable, an obligation that must sooner or later be met to confirm his manhood. He was twenty-eight in 1864, a man now, but a man with a 'soft' calling in a violent, obsessively masculine society. …the more apparent his lack of resolve became to him, the more he tried to mask it with belligerent posturing."

==== Sanitary Ball grievances letter published ====
The next day May 25, 1864 apparently not satisfied by the half-hearted, unsigned, and tardy apology, the damaging letter from the ladies of the Carson City Sanitary Ball that Twain and Goodman had refused to print in the Enterprise, began a three-day run in the Union as a paid public notice with the title "The Enterprise Libel of the ladies of Carson." Besides questioning Twain's integrity and honesty, the letter stressed "one thing was decided [about the funds raised], that they should go to the aid of the sick and wounded soldiers, who are fighting the battles of our country, and for no other purpose." It also accused Twain and his fellows of being "desirous of acquiring some glory by appropriating the efforts of the ladies to themselves." Historian Jerome Loving points out that in the ladies' response "the subjects of race or slavery never entered the discussion."

==== Letters to Orion & plans to leave ====
In a letter that day to Mollie and Orion (who was the head of the Ormsby County Sanitary Committee), Twain apologized if his actions had caused any decrease in their popularity. He also advised them against "making speeches for the Fund. I am mighty sick of that fund—it has caused me all my d[amne]d troubles--& I shall leave the Territory when your first speech is announced, & leave it for good." He related that he was "open to a challenge from three persons, & already awaiting the issue of such a message to another". He considered the matter of the ladies of the Sanitary Ball closed with the previous day's apology "they got out of me what no man would ever have got…as [far as the letter from the ladies of] Carson is concerned. I shall take no notice of it all, except to mash Mr. Laird over the head with my revolver for publishing it if I meet him today…[as for the Sanitary Ball ladies] I am quits with them. "

On May 26, 1864 Twain wrote his brother asking if he could "Send me two hundred dollars if you can spare it comfortably. However, never mind—you can send it to San Francisco if you prefer. Steve & I are going to the States. We leave Sunday morning per Henness Pass. Say nothing about it, of course. We are not afraid of the grand jury, but Washoe has long since grown irksome to us, & we want to leave it anyhow." The route through the pass was the longer less direct one, but it was the one that bypassed Carson City altogether.

Twain's mention of the Grand Jury indicates that all the regional reprints of his dueling challenges to Laird had come to the attention of the governmental authorities. The Nevada Territory had passed a law against dueling in November 1861 (An Act concerning Crimes and Punishments, section 35) making dueling punishable by a sentence of two to ten years imprisonment for the issuer and the receiver of the challenge. Grand Jury foreman Jerry Driscoll, who previously had been a business manager of the Enterprise told Twain that his opponents were going to lodge a criminal complaint about his challenge.

In his letter, Twain told his brother that "thoroughly canvassed the Carson business, & concluded we dare not do anything, either to Laird or Carson men without spoiling our chances of getting away." Despite his haste Twain stated that he would put his plans on hold if challenged to the field of honor by an angry spouse "if there is any chance of the husbands of those [Carson City] women challenging me, I don't want a straw put in the way of it. I'll wait for them a month, if necessary, & fight them with any weapon they choose."

==== Challenged to a second duel ====
Twain would soon have his chance to duel an angry husband from Carson City, when on May 28, 1864 William K. Cutler arrived at Virginia City and sent him a note issuing a formal duel challenge. Historian Louis J. Budd points out that Mrs. Cutler was one of the founders of the Sierra Seminary that "had suffered from his opinions only weeks before", which may explain Cutler's challenge despite Twain's letter to his wife and the public retraction in the Enterprise. After receiving Twain's personal letter, Mrs. Cutler had also reversed her previous behavior and joined the other high-society ladies in ostracizing Mollie Clemens. Twain wound up pasting four different duel challenges from angry Carson City husbands in his scrap book next to a clipping of the reluctant apology/retraction he made in the Enterprise. In response to the challenge, he sent Steve Gillis to speak to Cutler who was awaiting Twain's response at the hotel. Gillis delivered a letter from Twain saying "Having apologized once for that offensive conduct, I shall not do it again." He said he had received Cutler's challenge, and "I am ready to accept it. Having made my arrangements—before I received your note—to leave for California, & having no time to fool away on a common bummer like you, I want an immediate reply to this." Whether Cutler was mollified by the idea that Twain was leaving or was intimidated by Gillis (as Twain later claimed in his Autobiography) he dropped the matter and returned to Carson City.

== Exiting Nevada Territory ==
On Sunday May 29, 1864, Mark Twain, having quit the Enterprise, boarded the stagecoach with his friend Steve Gillis and began his journey out of the Nevada Territory to San Francisco; no duel was fought. The Territorial Enterprise wished him well, writing "Mark Twain leaves this morning for San Francisco. Sorry to see you go, Mark, old boy—but we cannot expect to have you always with us. Go then, where duty calls you, and when the highest pinnacle of fame affords you a arresting place remember that in the land of silver and sagebrush there are a host of old friends that rejoice in your success."

Historian James Edward Caron notes that outside of his friends and the staff of the Enterprise many were upset at "Clemen's unforgivable habit of conflating news narratives with fictional narratives, presented with the supremely blithe attitude of his alter ego Mark Twain. Some simply could not forgive Clemens for being a newspaper reporter who seemed completely indifferent to telling the truth". Among those expressing such sentiments at the time was the Gold Hill Evening News which was among the papers glad to see him leave. In an editorial appearing on May 30, 1864 they wrote "Among the few immortal names of the departed—that is, those who departed yesterday morning per California stage—we notice that of Mark Twain. We don't wonder. Mark Twain's beard is full of dirt, and his face is black before the people of Washoe. Giving way to the idiosyncratic eccentricities of an erratic mind, Mark has indulged in the game infernal—in short, 'played hell.' …The indignation aroused by his enormities has been too crushing to be borne by any living man, though sheathed with the brass and triple cheek of Mark Twain."

== Later visit to Nevada ==
Twain would only be able to repair the situation in 1866 when after rising to fame due to his lectures on his travels in Hawaii (also called the Sandwich Islands). After giving his lectures in many California cities and towns, he proceeded back into the young state of Nevada. On October 31, 1866 he performed his humorous lecture before a packed house in Virginia City. He was hesitant to go to the lecture arranged for Carson City that was scheduled for November 3, due to worries of lingering anger over his miscegenation hoax. His fears were ended by a public invitation printed in the Enterprise signed by the governor Henry G. Blasdel and more than 100 leading citizens of Carson City, including two husbands of the Sanitary Commission ladies, saying that they had "none other than the most kindly remembrances of you" and encouraging him to perform in their town. In response, he published a letter in the Enterprise thanking them for their tolerance "of one who has shamefully deserted the high office of Governor of the Third House of Nevada and gone into the Missionary business" and pledging to "disgorge a few lies and as much truth as I can pump out without damaging my constitution." Twain arrived in Carson City and played to a roaring crowd.

=== Armed robbery prank ===
Twain's triumphant return to Nevada was slightly marred in his estimation due to a surprising incident. On a trip back from Gold Hill (where he had given his lecture on November 10) to Virginia City. Twain and his literary agent Denis McCarthy (a one-time co-proprietor at the Enterprise) were making the five mile journey at night in an area where only two days before a pair of stagecoaches had been robbed at gunpoint. Suddenly six masked men flourishing revolvers emerged from the dark stopping Twain and his companion. They shouted things like ""Throttle him! Gag him! Kill him!" The leader of the men held a pistol to Twain's head ordering his accomplices "Beauregard", "Stonewall Jackson", and "Phil Sheridan" to empty their victim's pockets. They took $125 in cash from Twain, his $300 gold watch (the present from the Third House), two jackknives and three lead pencils – leaving his pockets empty. Later it was revealed that the "robbers" were Steve Gillis and some friends, who had let Twain's companion McCarthy in on the joke beforehand. Twain had a restless angry night, before he was told the truth in the morning. Gillis and friends stated that they had merely wanted to give Twain more material, and perhaps get him to give another lecture in Virginia City. Twain who had been shaken and remained seriously upset that they used real revolvers, tried to put on a brave face on the incident in his writing saying "they did not really frighten me bad enough to make their enjoyment worth the trouble they had taken." One of the pranksters differed with his take, saying Twain "was the scaredest man west of the Mississippi". Twain did have his possessions returned, but he fired McCarthy as his agent anyway.

== Final visit ==
The last time Twain traveled to Nevada was in 1868 on another lecture tour, this time about his voyage aboard the Quaker City and arrival in Lebanon, Syria, and Palestine which he called the Holy Land and which would be the basis for his book The Innocents Abroad. His performances were held in Carson City on April 29 and 30.

== Recollections ==
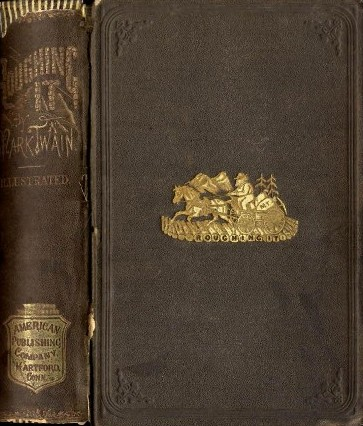
Twain wrote out stories of his time in Nevada and the West in his book Roughing It.

Twain used his memories of his time in Nevada as one of the sources for his book about living in the American West called Roughing It, which was published in 1872.

Historian Ron Powers points out that in particular, "The [Sanitary Commission] affair continued to vex him long afterward, and he treated it with careful levity in his writings. He can barely bring himself to touch on it in Roughing It", claiming he omitted it out of boredom. Twain wrote a humorous sketch about the affair titled "How I Escaped Being Killed in a Duel" that appeared in Every Saturday on December 21, 1872, and was retold in lectures for Roughing It, in Tom Hood's Comic Annual for 1873 and in his autobiographical dictation in 1906. In his autobiography, as Powers points out, "he treats the whole matter facetiously, as a kind of boys-will be boys romp in the Wild West. Dueling was a 'fashion'" where, despite his indifference to dueling, he got caught up in it "more or less out of boredom". The Mark Twain Encyclopedia points out that, in his later characterizations of the American South, Twain pointed to dueling "as an example of a culture's entrapment in outworn traditions."

In Twain's tales about the duel Rollin M. Daggett wrote up the challenges to Laird for him, and Laird backed out when Steve Gillis shot the head off a sparrow and told Laird's second that Twain had done the same feat from thirty yards. A similar version of events was told by Steve Gillis himself late in his life (though with contradictions in detail such as saying Laird was with the Chronicle rather than the Union at the time, the bird being a mud-hen, and him giving Twain the pistol after the shooting to fool Laird's seconds and telling him Twain made the shot himself rather than had bettered the shot earlier). Gillis also stated that Twain "was averse to violence" but "we thought it about time that his baptism took place…we finally prevailed upon him to send Laird a challenge, and when Laird did not send a reply at once we insisted on Mark sending him another challenge, by which time he had made himself believe that he really wanted to fight, as much as we wanted him to do." In Gillis' version Laird "took back all he had said" not in the paper but verbally and this was accepted by Twain. Gillis also claimed Twain sent the challenge to Cutler after he "had written Sam an insulting letter" but nothing came of it because "Cutler was out of town at the time" the day they left Nevada.

Another Virginia City local, Tom Fitch (crippled by Goodman in a previous duel), claimed Laird was "an arrant coward" who had failed in his effort to sell him the Union after receiving Twain's challenge, on the condition that when he took over the paper he assumed responsibility for engaging in the duel.

Some historians such as the authors of The Routledge Encyclopedia of Mark Twain point out that "There is no evidence to corroborate Twain's story of the pistol-practice session that induced Laird to decline the combat", concluding that this version of events was "A work, apparently, of Twain's comic imagination". Historians Forrest Glen Robinson and Leland Krauth also view these accounts as highly fictionalized reconstructions, "portraying Clemens as much less the fool and the coward than he was in fact. For example, not once is there mention of his editorial reference to the 'miscegenation society'". Krauth sees it as an example that "illuminate[s] the process whereby Mark Twain characteristically purged through his art that which was painful and humiliating in Sam Clemen's past", by "purging drunkenness, sex, and violence" while he "imposes on the whole of Roughing It a posture of propriety". Krauth notes that despite Twain's effort, he is never quite capable of purging "sexist, racist, and elitist" views of the Victorian culture of his times, (including in Puddn'head Wilson were Twain returned to the subject of miscegenation, where he underlined the absurdity of equating equality with racial purity but in the end re-establishes the acceptability of doing so).

When dictating his autobiography for the North American Review (published in 1906-1907) Twain presented the events around his stay in Virginia City and the episode of the duel again in a humorous way. But he did make a remark in his dictation that reflects something else saying "I was ashamed of myself, the rest of the staff were ashamed of me—but I got along well enough. I had always been accustomed to feeling ashamed of myself, for one thing or another, so there was no novelty for me in the situation." Historian Forrest Glen Robinson says this is an example of "what we know about poor Clemens's tyrannical conscience, and his virtual incapacity to forgive himself for any of the real and imagined wrongs that lurked, undying, in his memory." Twain is both humiliated by his participating in the irrational code duello and for not participating in it enough – leaving town; leaving him with nothing but "profound self-contempt…an anguish that needed telling but that was too shameful for direct expression".

== Impact of Nevada ==
Twain's stay in Nevada was a formative period in his personal growth in examining his culture and himself, and in his growth as a writer and a professional. Historian Ivan Benson points this out at length, stating that "Even without the editorial Troubles of May 1864 Mark Twain would not have remained on the Comstock Lode indefinitely. …However, the two years on the Comstock Lode as a reporter on the Territorial Enterprise had definitely contributed to Mark Twain's development as a writer." The Enterprise "had given him virtually a free rein" and let him make use of their influence and reputation to gather an audience. Not only did Samuel Clemens invent Mark Twain in his work for Nevada's Enterprise, but it was with their assistance that "he first attracted a reading public beyond his own locality, his work gaining the notice even of Eastern publications." Before coming to Nevada Samuel Clemens had tried three apprenticeships, with none of them panning out as a profession; "When Mark Twain left the Comstock Lode, he had served his final apprenticeship; he had made writing his career." Thanks to his time in Nevada, Twain was able to enter easily into the Bohemian literary society of San Francisco in May, 1864 and "required no apology…His work as a writer on the Territorial Enterprise had given him wide notoriety, and in previous visits to San Francisco he had been treated as a celebrity." Historian Ron Powers states that when Twain left Nevada he "drew the curtain of charity over the wildest, most irresponsible and dangerous period of his life. …But this dangerous interval was also the most important gestative period of his writing life. Sam discovered the true essence of his craft…"
