= John Humphrey (Illinois politician) =

English American attorney and politician (1838–1914)

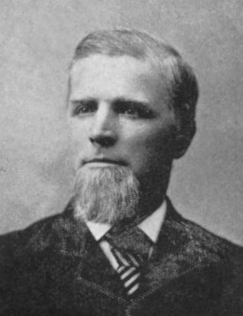

Member of the Illinois Senate from the 7th district
- In office 1886 – 1910
- Preceded by: William J. Campbell
- Succeeded by: William H. Maclean

Member of the Illinois House of Representatives from the 7th district
- In office 1884 – 1886
- Preceded by: Lorin C. Collins, Jr.

Member of the Illinois House of Representatives from the 95th district
- In office 1870 – 1872
- Preceded by: redistricted
- Succeeded by: redistricted

Personal details
- Born: June 20, 1838 Wisbech, England
- Died: October 3, 1914 (aged 76) Chicago, Illinois, US
- Party: Republican
- Profession: Attorney

John Humphrey (June 20, 1838 – October 3, 1914) was an English American politician and attorney who is credited as the father of Orland Park, Illinois. He was a member of the Illinois House of Representatives and the Illinois Senate. He was also the first mayor of Orland Park.

== Biography ==
John Humphrey was born in Wisbech, England on June 20, 1838. He came with his family to the United States in 1848. They were among the first settlers to arrive in what would become Orland Park, Illinois. During his youth, he helped his family on the farm while attending public schools. When Humphrey was twenty-one, he joined a wagon train headed to California. After working there a few years, he returned to his family in Illinois. Humphrey married Amelia Patrick in 1863. In 1866, he was elected to the Cook County Board of Supervisors. He was elected supervisor of Orland Township in 1870 and was elected township treasurer three years later. He studied law under Root & Arington and was admitted to the bar in 1874. He practiced in Chicago throughout his life.

When the Wabash, St. Louis & Pacific Railroad announced plans to open a station near their homestead in 1879, Humphrey purchased a large plot of land. He platted this land as a town center next to the railroad station. Although the railroad intended to name the station (and thus the town) Sedgewick, Humphrey rallied local leadership to change the name to Orland Park. When Orland Park was incorporated in 1892, Humphrey served as the town's first mayor, holding that elected office until his death in 1914. Humphrey's house, built in 1881 as the second permanent house in the settlement, would later become a museum operated by the Orland Historical Society.

Humphrey continued to establish himself as a local leader through state politics. In 1870, he was elected to the Illinois House of Representatives as a Republican, serving one term. He was re-elected the House in 1884, and then in 1886, he was elected to the Illinois Senate, where he served until 1910. Because Humphrey was perceived as an advocate for the Cook County suburbs at the expense of the city, Chicago newspapers often depicted him negatively. Nonetheless, he was elected in large margins until 1910.

During his Senate career, Humphrey introduced a number of important bills. The Torrens Bill, so named after Premier of South Australia Robert Torrens, allowed counties to establish permanent property title registries. This protected residents if the titles of their property were destroyed. This act of legislation was the first of its kind in the United States, and would later be adopted by eighteen other states. Approved in 1897, the law was in effect until 1997. Humphrey also introduced legislation reassigning the duty of prisoner diet to the Superintendent of Public Service. Funds for prisoner diet previously were sent directly the county sheriff, some of which kept the money and used very little on food. The law saved the state money and improved prisoner care.

Humphrey fathered seven children with his wife Amelia. He was widowed in 1898. Late that year, he married his secretary Ida Stuart, with whom he had a son. In 1914, he took a trip to his ancestral home in Wisbech. While trying to leave England via Liverpool at the end of his journey, he fell ill. When he returned to Chicago on September 26, he was immediately admitted to St. Luke's Hospital. He died on October 3, 1914.

== See also ==
- Humphrey bills
