= Parkview Christian Church =

- Parkview Christian Church
- Parkview Christian Church
- 41.557770°N 87.888471°W
- Location: Orland Park, IL, Homer Glen, IL and New Lenox, IL
- Country: United States
- Denomination: Non-Denominational, Evangelical Christian
- Website: parkviewchurch.com

History
- Founded: 1950

Parkview Christian Church is a non-denominational church. It located in Orland Park, Illinois, a suburb of Chicago.

== History ==
In 1950, two women formed a prayer group which eventually evolved into Tinley Park Church of Christ. The group of 30 met for the first worship service on April 15, 1951, in a "storefront" on Oak Park Avenue. TPCC was able to purchase the Zion Lutheran building, and on February 13, 1955, they moved into their own building. In 1974, a decision was made to sell that building and relocate as they had outgrown the facility.

After 22 years on Oak Park Avenue, the building at 16250 South 84th Avenue was built, and the congregation moved in on October 2, 1977. Then, on June 4, 1990, the church voted to change the name of "Tinley Park Church of Christ" to "Tinley Park Christian Church", thus clearing up some confusion in the community.

In 1989, the church was averaging 150 in attendance. Sunday mornings grew to three services. By 2000 the church had grown to 500 in worship attendance. Parkview then purchased land at the corner of 183rd and Wolf Rd, at the time an essentially vacant area of Orland Park. With the involvement of the city, the church purchased 12 acres with an option of six more for later. With the announcement of the state's involvement in the development of 183rd St, the property value has greatly increased and plans for ministry have been enhanced.

Phase I of the building plan at the Orland Park campus was completed in fall 2002 and the congregation then relocated to the newly built facility. Phase II of the long-range plans, 84,000-square-foot (7,800 m^{2}) addition with a worship center seating 1,700, opened in March 2006. The third phase of the building, which included more lobby and office space, as well as a chapel for weddings and funerals, opened for the 2013 Christmas services.

In 2010, Outreach rated Parkview as one of the 100 fastest growing churches in America for two years in a row.

In 2015, the weekly attendance was 7,000 people.

According to a church census released in 2020, it claimed a weekly attendance of 5,407 people.

=== Campuses ===
In 2015, Parkview was approached by a church in Homer Glen and was presented with the opportunity to acquire their building, and to expand on the ministry that this congregation began there. It was a building with ministry space and a location on 159th Street near I-355, but since it was so close to Lockport they decided to move the Lockport Campus to the new location. Parkview's Homer Glen Campus opened for Christmas Eve 2015. They planned to launch their third campus in New Lenox in time for 2016 Christmas Eve services.

In early 2016, Parkview began construction on its third campus in New Lenox, near the corner of Laraway Road and South Schoolhouse Road, and opened for Christmas Eve services in December 2016.

== See also ==
- List of megachurches in the United States
