= Empire and the Carson River mills =

- Location within Nevada
- 39°11′06″N 119°42′48″W

History
- Built: 1860

Nevada Historical Marker
- Reference no.: 1

Empire and Carson River mills is an historic area in Carson City, Nevada. The mills were established along the Carson River near Empire, now part of Carson City (not to be confused with Empire in Washoe County).

== History ==
In the 1850s, Nicholas Ambrose opened up a station along the Carson River. The station was known as Dutch Nicks Station or Nicks Station. In May 1860, the town was laid out by Eugene Angel and others, who named it Empire City.

"The Mexican" was the first of the mills and was established in 1860 to process the ore from the Comstock Lode. One estimate had the total number of mills operating as 186, with names like "Brunswick," "Merrimac," "Santiago," "Vivian," and "Yellow Jacket."

On October 23, 1863, Mark Twain wrote a hoax article called "A Bloody Massacre near Carson" (alternatively, the "Empire City Massacre Hoax") about a man who purportedly killed his wife and nine children. The hoax article stated that the alleged perpetrator lived in the "great pine forest which lies between Empire City and Dutch Nick's." At the time, there was no pine forest within 15 miles of Empire City. In addition, Empire City and Dutch Nicks referred to the same location.

The area is listed as Nevada Historical Marker 1.

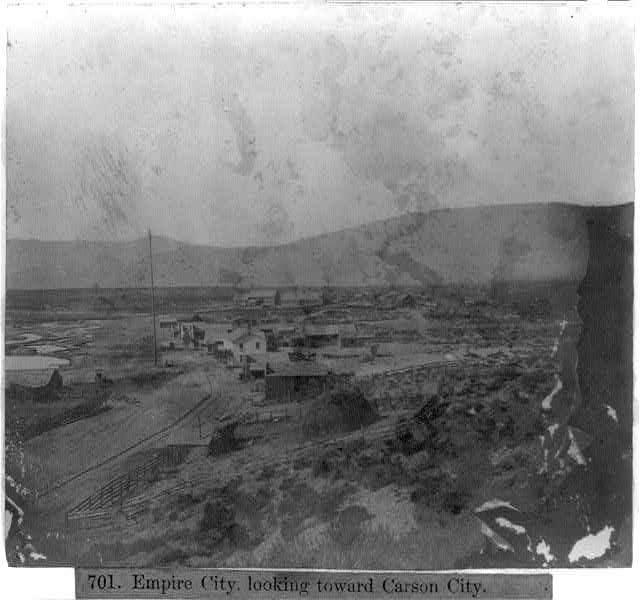
Empire City, looking toward Carson City (1866)

== Notable residents ==
- Anne Henrietta Martin, a suffragist, pacifist, and author.
- Edwin E. Roberts, a United States representative from Nevada and mayor of Reno.

== External Resources ==
- Silver, Sue. Empire City Cemetery. March 2011
