= Humphreys House =

Humphreys House or Humphreys Building may refer to:

in the United States

- David C. Humphreys House, Huntsville, Alabama, listed on the National Register of Historic Places (NRHP)
- Humphreys-Ryan House, Hot Springs, Arkansas, NRHP-listed, in Garland County
- Gen. David Humphreys House, Ansonia, Connecticut, NRHP-listed in New Haven County
- Sanford-Humphreys House, Seymour, Connecticut, listed on the NRHP in New Haven County, Connecticut
- Sir John Humphreys House, Swampscott, Massachusetts, NRHP-listed
- Rosemary-Humphreys House, Greenwood, Mississippi, listed on the NRHP in Leflore County, Mississippi
- Humphreys Drugstore Building, Grandfield, Oklahoma, listed on the NRHP in Tillman County, Oklahoma

== See also ==
- Humphrey House (disambiguation)
