= Humphrey House (Reno, Nevada) =

Historic house in Nevada, United States

- U.S. National Register of Historic Places
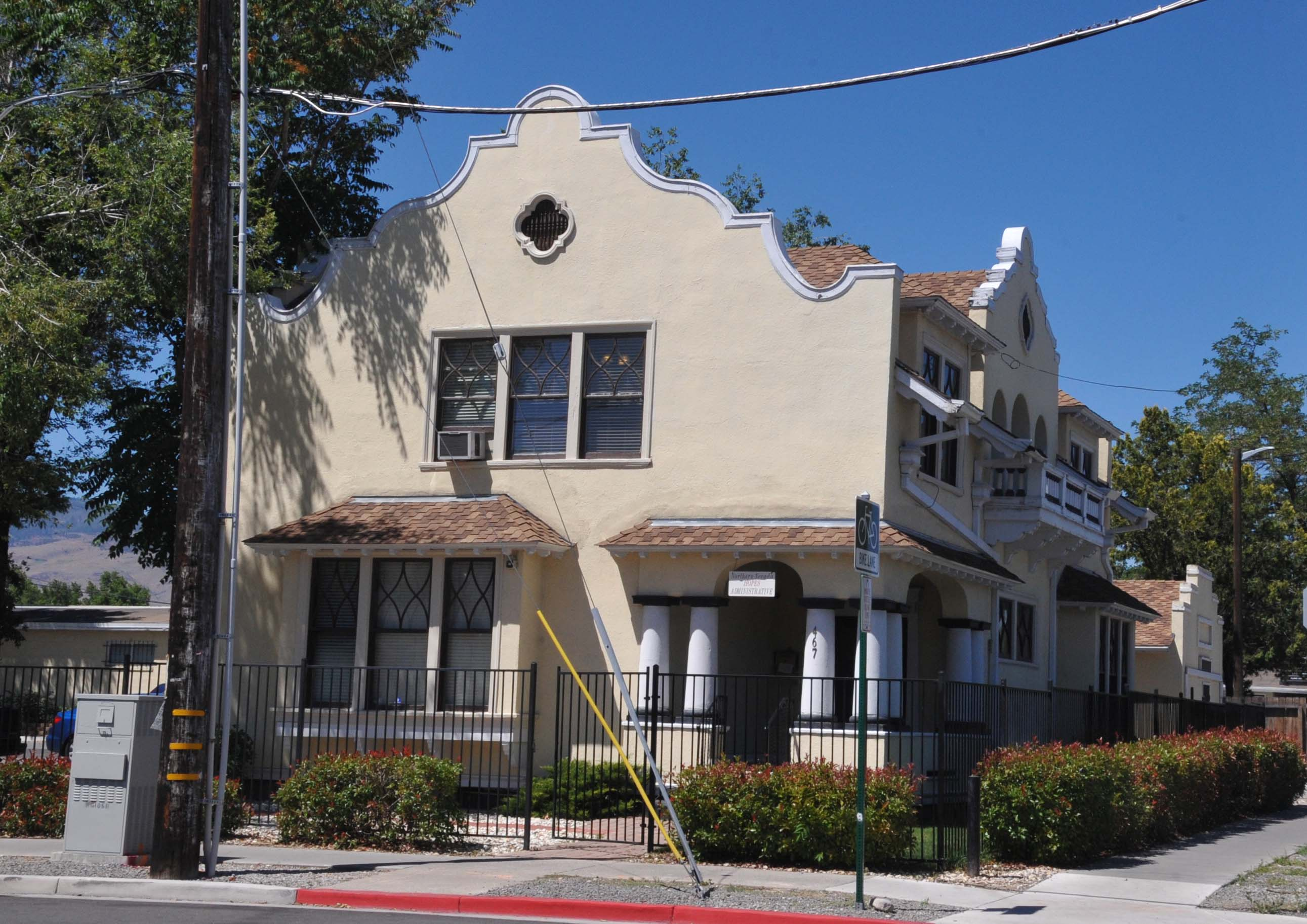

- Location within Nevada Location within the United States
- Location: 467 Ralston St., Reno, Nevada
- Coordinates: 39°31′47″N 119°49′13″W
- Area: 0.5 acres (0.20 ha)
- Built: 1906
- Built by: Mabson, Arthur
- Architect: Schadler, Fred M.
- Architectural style: Mission/Spanish Revival
- NRHP reference No.: 83001118
- Added to NRHP: March 7, 1983

The Humphrey House in Reno, Nevada, located at 467 Ralston St., is a historic house built in 1906. Designed by Reno architect Fred Schadler, it is significant architecturally and for association with Nevada governors Tasker Oddie and Emmet Boyle, who were guests there. It was listed on the National Register of Historic Places in 1983.

Its NRHP nomination identifies it as "a superlative residential example of the Mission Revival style and one that is unique to Reno." It was built for the Frank E. Humphrey family and owned by the family into the 1960s.

== See also ==
- 20th Century Club (Reno, Nevada), also Schadler-designed and NRHP-listed
