= 20th Century Club (Reno, Nevada) =

- 20th Century Building
- U.S. National Register of Historic Places
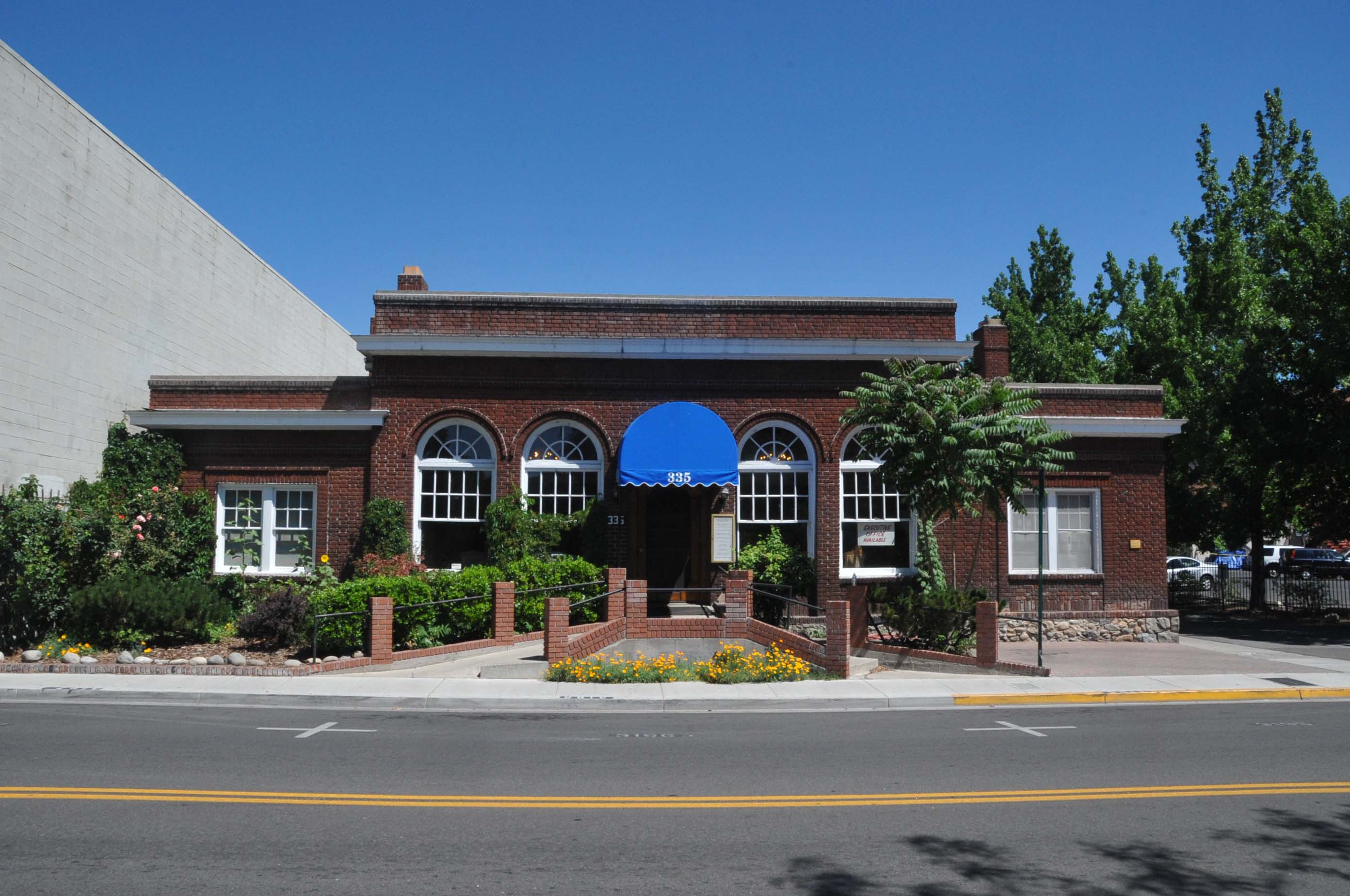

- Location within Nevada Location within the United States
- Location: 335 W. First St., Reno, Nevada
- Coordinates: 39°31′29″N 119°49′2″W
- Area: 0.2 acres (0.081 ha)
- Built: 1925
- Architect: Schadler, Fred M.
- Architectural style: Classical Revival, Prairie School
- NRHP reference No.: 83001113
- Added to NRHP: April 21, 1983

The Twentieth Century Club of Reno is a women's club in Reno, Nevada, founded in 1894. It is the oldest active women's club in Nevada according to the organization. The club's former clubhouse, now known as the 20th Century Building, was completed in 1925 and was listed on the National Register of Historic Places in 1983. The club was active in civic, educational, and philanthropic work in Reno during the late 19th and early 20th centuries. Its clubhouse, designed by Fred M. Schadler, was recognized for both its architecture and its association with the organization.

== History ==
The Twentieth Century Club was organized in 1894. Mrs. Walter McNab Miller served as its first president, and the original membership consisted of 84 women. According to club accounts, the organization's name was intended to reflect a forward-looking orientation toward the approaching 20th century. In its early years, the club sponsored a circulating library and educational initiatives. Members established a circulating library in 1894 and funded a scholarship to the University of Nevada in 1898. In 1901, club members participated in founding the Kindergarten Association and advocated for the establishment of public kindergartens throughout Nevada. During wartime, members also contributed to home-front relief efforts.

Before 1930, the club was involved in a range of reform and civic causes, including public health measures, educational work, and other social initiatives. Among the issues with which it was associated were laws prohibiting spitting on sidewalks. Membership later reached about 1,000.

The club sold its clubhouse in 1980, and its Steinway grand piano was donated to the Reno Philharmonic. Since 1986, the organization has awarded scholarships to female students interested in medicine and has continued its philanthropic activities in the Reno area.

== 20th Century Building ==
The club's former clubhouse, now known as the 20th Century Building, stands at 335 West First Street in Reno. It was built in 1925 by Roush and Belz. The building was designed by Fred M. Schadler and incorporates elements of Classical Revival and Prairie School architecture.

The building served as a center for club functions and also hosted weddings, luncheons, dinner dances, and civic meetings. In the National Register nomination, it was described as an "interesting" building by a prominent local architect and as significant for its association with the Twentieth Century Club, which was described as "prominent and important" in Reno.

The building was added to the National Register of Historic Places on April 21, 1983. It was deemed significant as an "interesting" building designed by a prominent local architect and for association with the Twentieth Century Club, which was "prominent and important" in Reno.

== Later activities ==
The club continues to hold meetings and philanthropic programs. According to the organization, it awards scholarships, provides donations to local charitable groups, and holds monthly luncheons from September through May featuring music or guest speakers.

== See also ==
- Humphrey House, 467 Ralston St., Reno, also designed by Schadler and NRHP-listed
