= Cooper's Hawk Winery & Restaurants =

Illinois-based restaurant and winery chain

- Type: Privately-held company
- Industry: Restaurants and wineries
- Founded: 2005; 21 years ago in Orland Park, Illinois, USA
- Founder: Tim McEnery
- Headquarters: Downers Grove, Illinois
- Number of locations: 69 (2024)
- Key people: Tim McEnery(CEO)
- Revenue: $280 million USD (2019)
- Website: Official website

Cooper's Hawk Winery & Restaurants is an Illinois-based restaurant and winery chain founded by Tim McEnery. The company's 69 locations each include a full-service restaurant, tasting room, and retail store.

The company opened its first restaurant location in Orland Park, Illinois in 2005. The chain has locations in Arizona, Florida, Georgia, Illinois, Indiana, Iowa, Maryland, Michigan, Missouri, Ohio, Virginia, North Carolina and Wisconsin.

== History ==
Founder Tim McEnery opened his first Cooper's Hawk in October 2005 in Orland Park, Illinois, three years after working in restaurant management, he noticed that very few wineries had an on-site restaurant. It became Illinois' first establishment with a winery and restaurant under the same roof. The company has since expanded to 69 locations across the Midwest and Southeastern United States.

In 2019, the company's revenue was $280 million, and it was acquired by Ares Management in a transaction valued at approximately $700 million.

== Restaurant and winery ==
The Cooper's Hawk central wine production facility is located in Woodridge, Illinois. The 125,000-square-foot facility serves as the hub where wines are produced, and blended, with grapes and juice sourced from regions such as California. Each restaurant stores and displays barrels of Cooper's Hawk wine, where they undergo the aging process from a few months up to 18 months.

Cooper's Hawk makes almost 60 different wines and sells only its own wines in its restaurants, as well as producing 12 "wines of the month" each year. As of December 2022, the company had 600,000 wine club members. In 2022, Cooper's Hawk opened two branded restaurants under the name "By Cooper's Hawk"

== Awards ==
Cooper's Hawk has earned a number of wine awards from local, national, and international competitions. The awards include being named a "Hot Concept" in 2010 and a "MenuMaster" in 2013 by Nation's Restaurant News, and a Top 10 Best Winery Restaurant in 2021 from USA Today, as well as earning "Best of Award of Excellence" in 2022 from Wine Spectator.

In January 2009 and 2013, Cooper's Hawk was selected to pour its wines at the Illinois Inaugural Gala in Washington, D.C. It also created Cooper's Hawk Artist Red Blend for the 27th Screen Actors Guild Awards.

Cooper's Hawk is listed as one of the best restaurants in Chicago in the book Food Lovers' Guide to Chicago: The Best Restaurants, Markets and Local Culinary Offerings.
