= Sierra Seminary =

Defunct private school in Nevada, United States

Information
- Former name: Miss Clapp's School
- Funding type: Private school
- Established: 1860
- Founder: Hannah Keziah Clapp
- Closed: c.1886
- Gender: Mixed
- Enrollment: c.40 (1864)

The Sierra Seminary (originally: Miss Clapp's School) was a private, co-educational school in Carson City, Nevada, US.

== History ==
With the support of the Nevada Territory Legislature, Governor James W. Nye and U.S. Senator William Morris Stewart, it was established in 1860, and founded the following year, by Hannah Keziah Clapp, the first instructor and librarian at the University of Nevada, Reno. Clapp was assisted by Mrs. Cutler and later by Miss Elizabeth C. Babcock. Many of Nevada's prominent citizens of the day were educated at this school.

By 1864, there were about 40 students, and in 1865, a new building was erected. Mark Twain visited Sierra Seminary twice, subsequently incorporating some of what he observed into his 1876 novel, The Adventures of Tom Sawyer.

It existed until approximately 1886.
