= John Humphrey House (Orland Park, Illinois) =

Historic house in Illinois, United States

- U.S. National Register of Historic Places
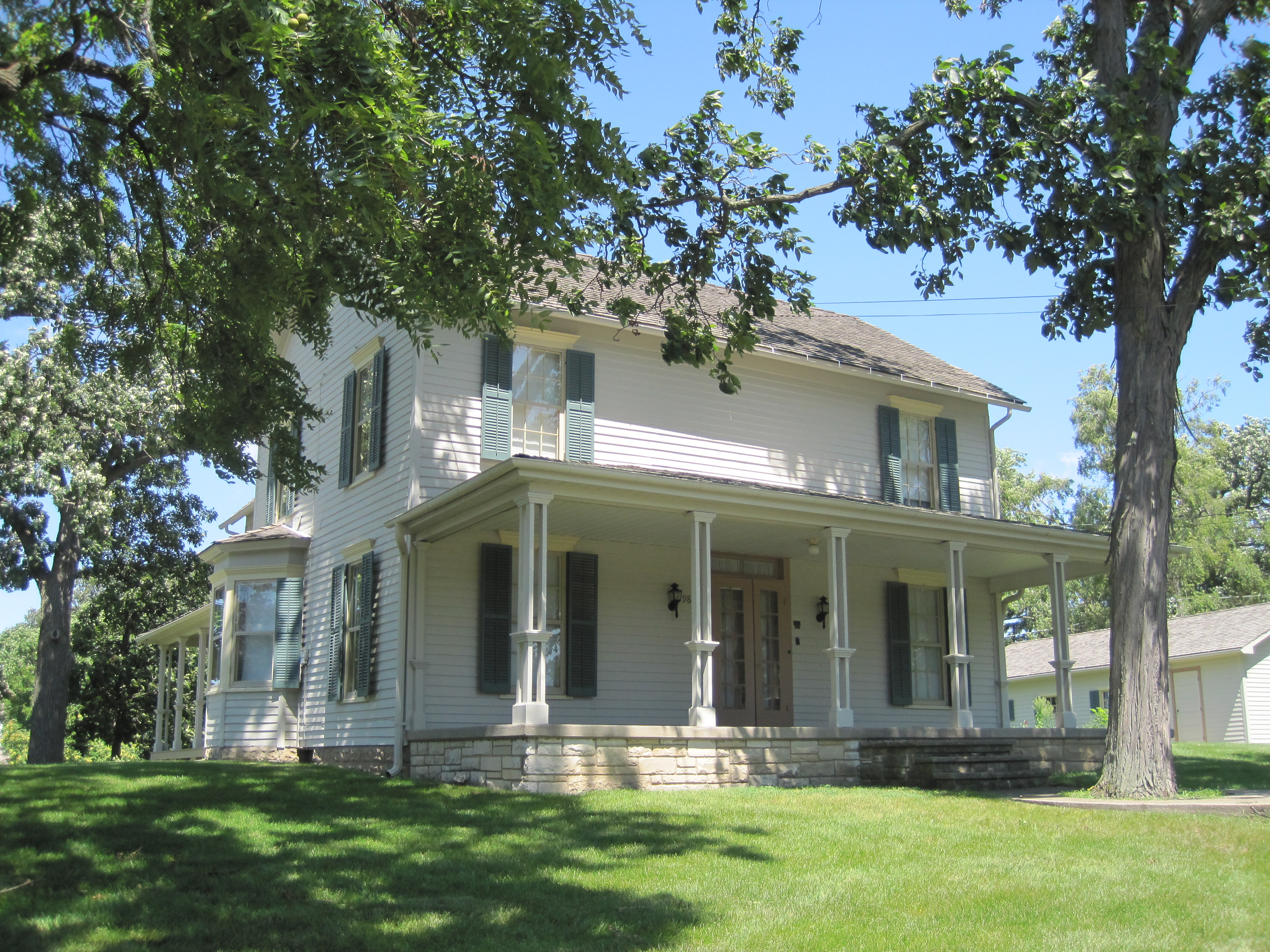
- John Humphrey House in 2011

- Location within Illinois Location within the United States
- Location: 9830 W. 144th Place, Orland Park, Illinois
- Coordinates: 41°37′48″N 87°51′34″W
- Built: 1881
- NRHP reference No.: 05000114
- Added to NRHP: August 1, 2005

The John Humphrey House is a historic home in Orland Park, Illinois. It was listed on the National Register of Historic Places in 2005. The second permanent house built in Orland Park, it was home to Illinois Senator John Humphrey.

== History ==
John Humphrey, a native of Wisbech, England, came with his family in 1848 to the area that would become Orland Park, Illinois. He was elected to the Cook County Board of Supervisors in 1866 and elected supervisor of Orland Township four years later. Humphrey purchased a large plot of land in anticipation of the expansion of the Wabash, St. Louis & Pacific Railroad and rallied to have the lands named Orland Park in 1879. Humphrey was first elected to the Illinois House of Representatives in 1870 and to the Illinois Senate in 1886. The town of Orland Park was incorporated in 1892 and Humphrey was elected its first mayor, a position he held until his death in 1914.

Humphrey built his residence, the second permanent house in the town, in 1881. It was built in a vernacular four-over-four design with a two-story ell. Humphrey's son John Stuart maintained the house until 1987. The house was recognized by the National Park Service with a listing on the National Register of Historic Places on August 1, 2005.

== Architecture ==
The main facade of the house faces south. It has three bays with a one-story porch. The main entrance, with French doors, is centrally located. The other two bays feature double-hung windows on each story; wood shutters are original. The porch foundation was originally brick but has since been replaced with stone. The transom over the door and window hoods is generally Georgian in style. The porch roof, with wooden shingles, is hipped.
