= John Humphrey House (Simsbury, Connecticut) =

Historic house in Connecticut, United States

- U.S. National Register of Historic Places
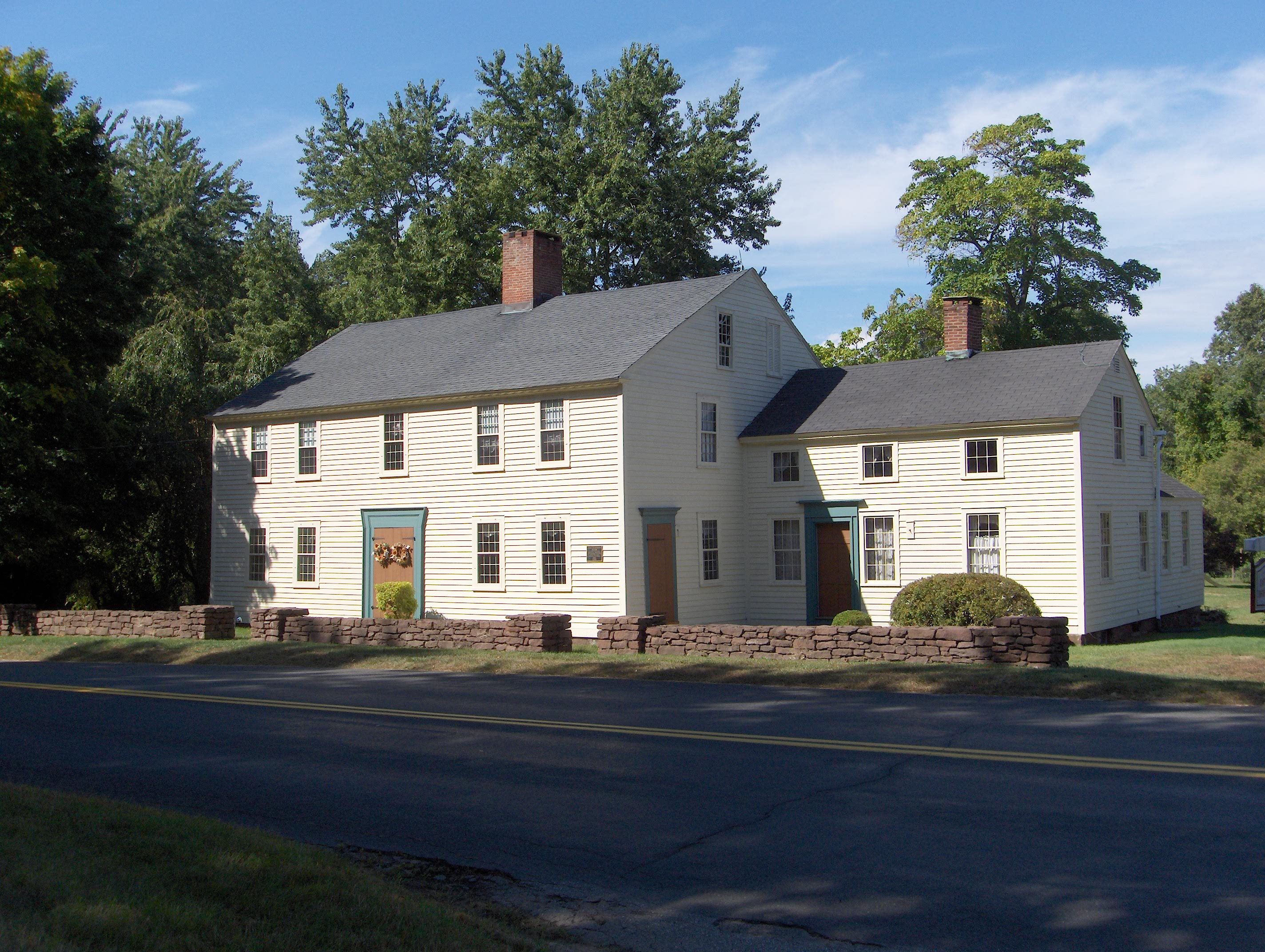

- Location within Connecticut Location within the United States
- Location: 115 East Weatogue Street, Simsbury, Connecticut
- Coordinates: 41°51′48″N 72°47′43″W
- Area: 5.1 acres (2.1 ha)
- Built: ca. 1760
- Architectural style: Colonial, Post medieval English
- NRHP reference No.: 90001755
- Added to NRHP: November 15, 1990

The John Humphrey House is a historic house at 115 East Weatogue Street in Simsbury, Connecticut. Built about 1760, it is a well-preserved example of a Georgian colonial residence. It was listed on the National Register of Historic Places in 1990.

== Description and history ==
The John Humphrey House is located in Simsbury's rural East Weatogue area, on the west side of East Weatogue Road north of its junction with Talcott Mountain Road. It is a two-story frame house, five bays wide, with a centered entry and a large central chimney. Its exterior is finished in wooden clapboards. Additions extend the main block to the right and rear. The interior follows a typical center-chimney plan, with a narrow entrance vestibule that has a winding staircase to the second floor. On either side of the chimney are parlor spaces, with the original kitchen in a long room behind. The parlor spaces have fine original Georgian wooden paneling; the left parlor has a more elaborate fireplace surround, with fluted pilasters, and an elaborate builtin corner cabinet. The ell extending to the right, a 19th-century addition, retains features period to its original construction, although one of its fireplaces has been bricked over.

The house's construction is estimated to have been in 1760, based in part on land records, and in part from the location of the bake oven in the kitchen, which is not typically sited where it is in earlier construction. The land on which it stands was granted to Michael Humphrey in 1668, but there is no firm evidence of a house until 1760, when the estate of his grandson John was inventoried.

== See also ==
- National Register of Historic Places listings in Hartford County, Connecticut
