= Orland Park, Illinois =

- Village
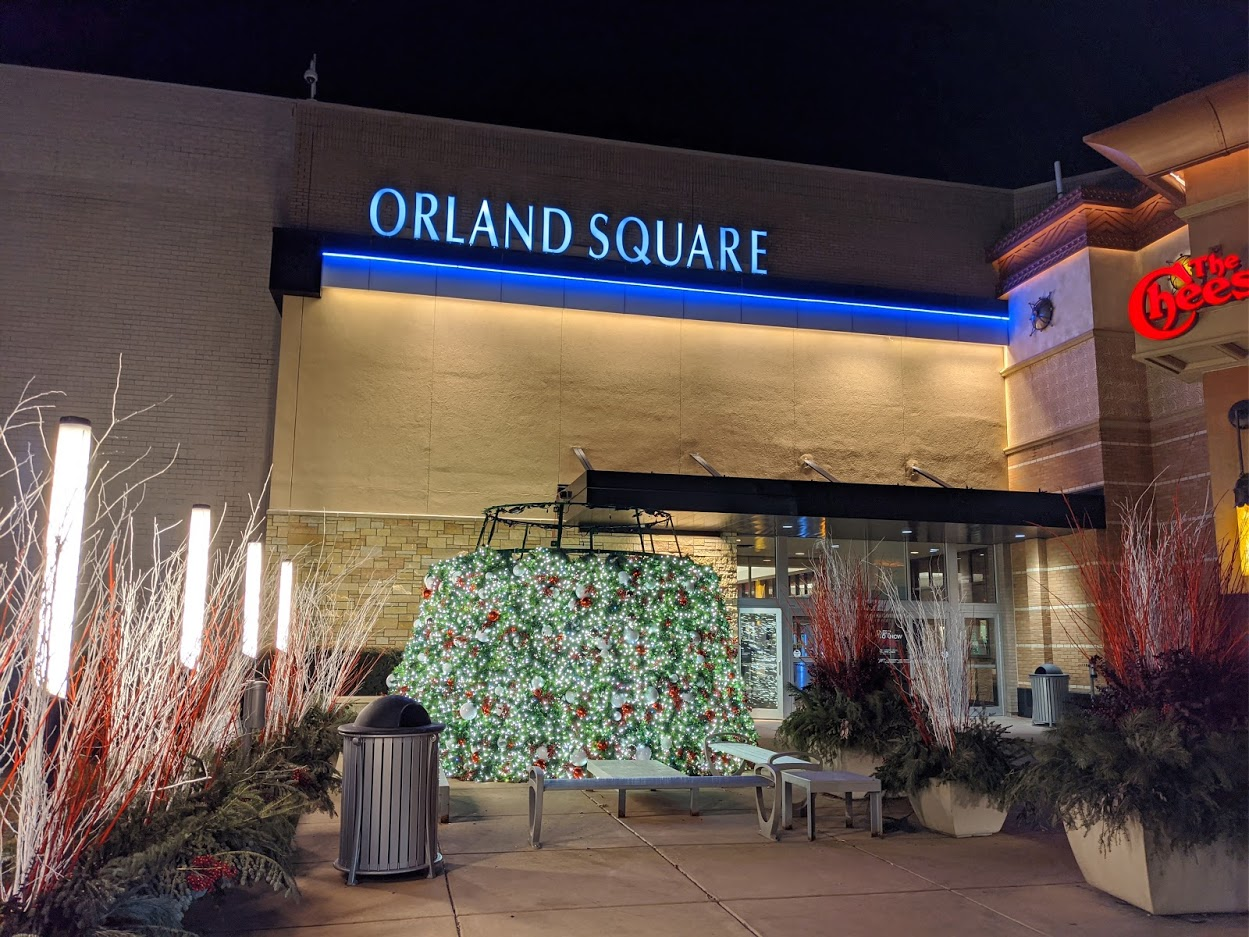
- The Orland Square Mall in January 2020

- Flag Seal Logo
- Nickname: "World's Golf Center"
- Motto: "Where you want to be"
- Interactive map of Orland Park, Illinois
- Location within Greater Chicago Location within Illinois Location within the United States
- Coordinates: 41°36′26″N 87°51′42″W
- Country: United States
- State: Illinois
- Counties: Cook, Will
- Townships: Cook: Orland, Palos, Bremen; Will: Frankfort
- Incorporated: May 31, 1892

Government
  - Type: Council–manager
  - Mayor: James Dodge (R)

Area
  - Total: 22.31 sq mi (57.79 km^{2})
  - Land: 22.03 sq mi (57.05 km^{2})
  - Water: 0.29 sq mi (0.74 km^{2}) 1.31%
- Elevation: 686 ft (209 m)

Population (2020)
  - Total: 58,703
  - Estimate (2024): 58,020 ▼
  - Density: 2,664.9/sq mi (1,028.92/km^{2})

Standard of living (2009-11)
  - Per capita income: $35,320
  - Median home value: $292,200
- ZIP code(s): 60462, 60467
- Area code(s): 708
- Geocode: 56640
- FIPS code: 17-56640
- Website: www.orlandpark.org

Orland Park is a village in Cook County, Illinois, United States, with a small portion in Will County. It is a south suburb of Chicago. Per the 2020 census, Orland Park had a population of 58,703. Located 25 miles (40 km) southwest of Chicago, Orland Park is close to several interstate highways, with the I-80 east-west coast connector as its southern border. The Metra commuter rail system links it to the Chicago Loop and from there to O'Hare and Midway airports.

== History ==
Orland Park was first settled as "Orland" in 1834, with Henry Taylor being the area's first settler. Other original settlers include Ichabod and William Myrick, Jacob and Bernard Hostert, Thomas Cooper and John Humphrey. The Hostert brothers built log cabins for their families, which became some of the first homes built in Orland Park. In 1879, what would become the Wabash Railroad 6th district was constructed through Orland Park, leading way for the town's first train station, "Sedgwick Station." This development took the town from an agrarian society to a commercial hub that provides shipping services to local farms. The village was incorporated on May 31, 1892. Orland Square Mall opened in 1976.

== Geography ==
According to the 2021 census gazetteer files, Orland Park has a total area of 22.31 square miles (57.78 km^{2}), of which 22.03 square miles (57.06 km^{2}) (or 98.72%) is land and 0.29 square miles (0.75 km^{2}) (or 1.28%) is water.

The main bodies of water in Orland are two lakes: Lake Sedgewick and McGinnis Slough.

Communities bordering Orland Park include Homer Glen (in Will County) to the west, Orland Hills and Mokena (also in Will County but Orland Hills is in Cook County) to the south, Tinley Park to the southeast, Oak Forest to the east, and Palos Park and Palos Heights to the north.

== Demographics ==
Historical population
Census	Pop.	Note	%±
1900	366		—
1910	369		0.8%
1920	343		−7.0%
1930	571		66.5%
1940	631		10.5%
1950	788		24.9%
1960	2,592		228.9%
1970	6,391		146.6%
1980	23,045		260.6%
1990	35,720		55.0%
2000	51,077		43.0%
2010	56,767		11.1%
2020	58,703		3.4%
U.S. Decennial Census

=== Racial and ethnic composition ===
Orland Park village, Illinois – Racial and ethnic composition Note: the US Census treats Hispanic/Latino as an ethnic category. This table excludes Latinos from the racial categories and assigns them to a separate category. Hispanics/Latinos may be of any race.
Race / Ethnicity (NH = Non-Hispanic)	Pop 2000	Pop 2010	Pop 2020	% 2000	% 2010	% 2020
White alone (NH)	46,478	48,851	47,336	91.00%	86.06%	80.64%
Black or African American alone (NH)	367	936	1,984	0.72%	1.65%	3.38%
Native American or Alaska Native alone (NH)	29	20	43	0.06%	0.04%	0.07%
Asian alone (NH)	1,763	2,777	3,132	3.45%	4.89%	5.34%
Native Hawaiian or Pacific Islander alone (NH)	12	3	5	0.02%	0.01%	0.01%
Other race alone (NH)	63	32	170	0.12%	0.06%	0.29%
Mixed race or Multiracial (NH)	491	620	1,373	0.96%	1.09%	2.34%
Hispanic or Latino (any race)	1,874	3,528	4,660	3.67%	6.21%	7.94%
Total	51,077	56,767	58,703	100.00%	100.00%	100.00%

=== 2020 census ===
As of the 2020 census, Orland Park had a population of 58,703, with 22,912 households and 15,952 families. The median age was 46.8 years. The population was 19.3% under the age of 18, 6.3% from 18 to 24, 21.2% from 25 to 44, 28.8% from 45 to 64, and 24.4% age 65 or older. For every 100 females, there were 90.7 males, and for every 100 females age 18 and over, there were 87.5 males.

99.9% of residents lived in urban areas, while 0.1% lived in rural areas.

Of all households, 25.9% had children under the age of 18 living in them. 56.2% were married-couple households, 13.4% were households with a male householder and no spouse or partner present, and 26.8% were households with a female householder and no spouse or partner present.

There were 23,746 housing units, of which 3.5% were vacant. The homeowner vacancy rate was 1.2% and the rental vacancy rate was 5.9%. The population density was 2,630.89 inhabitants per square mile (1,015.79/km^{2}), and housing units were at an average density of 1,064.22 per square mile (410.90/km^{2}).

=== Households and housing ===
In additional demographic estimates, 29.06% of households were non-families. The average household size was 3.15 and the average family size was 2.57.

=== Income and poverty ===
The median income for a household in the village was $84,676, and the median income for a family was $104,343. Males had a median income of $60,998 versus $41,224 for females. The per capita income for the village was $42,900. About 4.5% of families and 4.9% of the population were below the poverty line, including 4.8% of those under age 18 and 7.2% of those age 65 or over.

== Economy ==
Orland Park's businesses and jobs include finance, retail, services and healthcare. Shopping complexes include Orland Park Crossing and Orland Square Mall. Healthcare in Orland Park includes specific clinics, immediate care, and primary care.

By 2022, Orland Park Village Board is in the process of planning and reconstructing Orland Park Downtown. Edwards Realty Company is the real estate developer involved with this project. The development is located on 143rd street and LaGrange Road known as Main Street Triangle. Restaurants, retail, and entertainment will be added to the 140,000 square feet of land. Estimated date of completion is fall of 2027.

=== Top employers ===
According to Orland Park's 2012 Comprehensive Annual Financial Report, the city's top employers were:

#	Employer	# of Employees
1	Consolidated High School District 230	920
2	Orland School District 135	737
3	Jewel-Osco	530
4	Carson's	325
5	J. C. Penney	325
6	Panduit	300
7	The Horton Group	300
8	Macy's	200
9	Target	200
10	Sears	195

== Parks and recreation ==
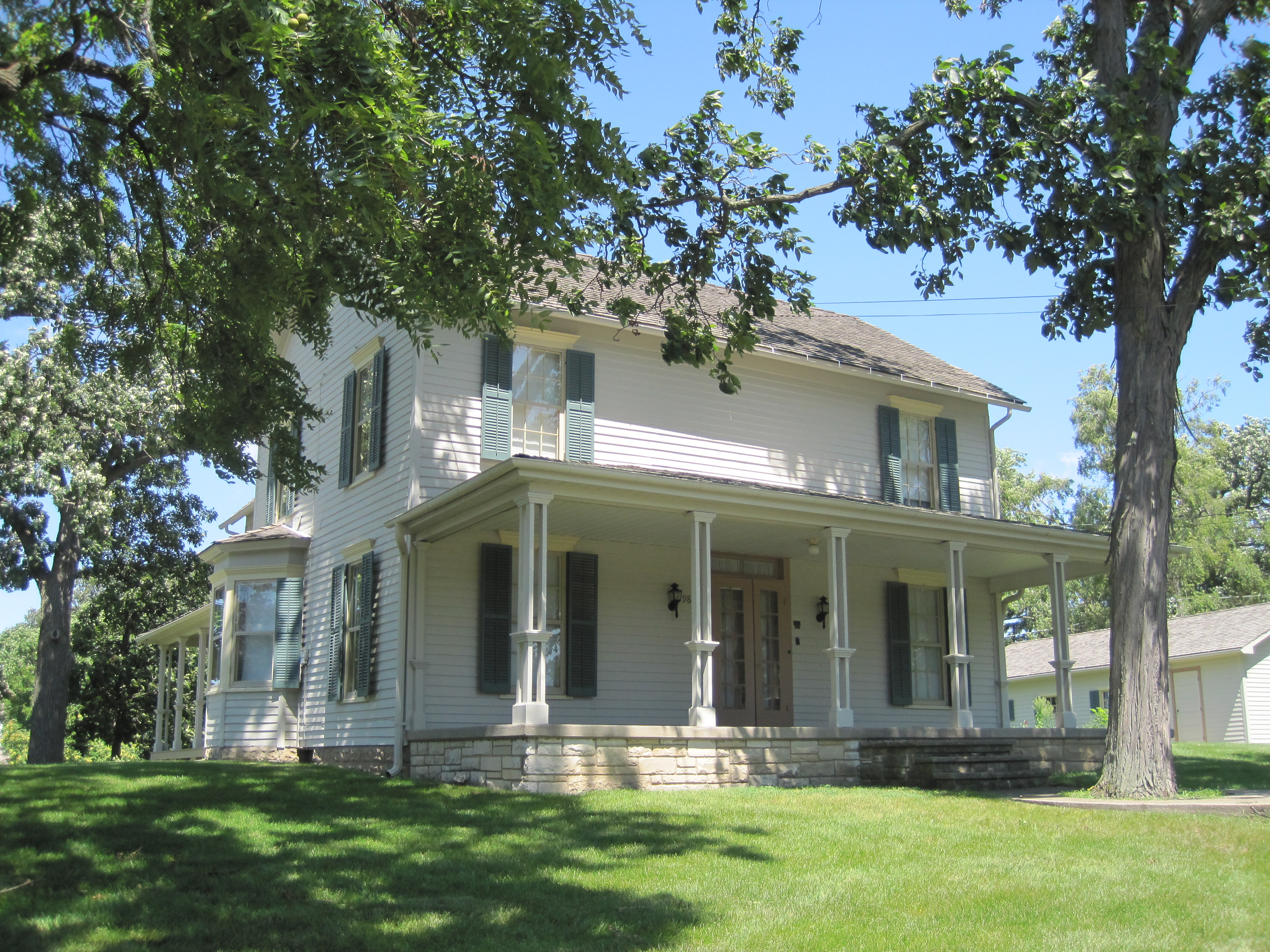
The historic John Humphrey House.

Orland Park has a large Recreation and Parks Department. The village has over 60 parks, with plenty of options for recreation, from sports complexes to nature trails.

The Centennial Park Aquatic Center is a 192-acre (78 ha) park with a public pool. With six water slides, two large pools, and a children's play area, it is one of the largest public pools in the area. Since its debut in 1992, the Aquatic center has gone through multiple renovations. Add-ons have included two additional water slides and two outdoor sand volleyball courts.

Just south of the Centennial Park Aquatic Center is the 95-acre (38 ha) Lake Segdewick. It has hiking paths, nature trails, boardwalks, boat ramps, and pedal boats and kayaks for rent. Fishing is allowed.

The Winter Wonderland Ice Rink is also in Centennial Park. Open from November to March, this outdoor ice rink is free of charge. There is a small warming hut where you can rent ice skates.

The Sportsplex, on 159th Street, is Orland Park's largest indoor recreational facility. It has three full-sized basketball courts, an indoor soccer field, and a full weight room with free weights, plenty of cardio options, and a ¼-mile (400 meter) indoor track. Personal trainers are available, along with fitness classes, including Pilates, yoga, cycling, and Zumba. The Sportsplex also has a 35-foot (11 m) rock wall with six different routes for all skill levels.

The Recreation and Parks Department also helps organize many public events. Centennial Park hosts charity events and seasonal events, including the Orland Park Turkey Trot, a 5K run held on Thanksgiving morning at the John Humphrey Complex. These events are heavily advertised and supported by students of Carl Sandburg High School.

Orland Park is the touted "World's Golf Center". According to village lore, someone counted 1,089 golf holes within a 15-mile (24 km) radius of the village, said Jodi Marneris, Orland Park's spokeswoman in 1996. The "World's Golf Center" concept was then proudly plastered on the village flag and painted on the town's seven water towers.

== Culture ==
Orland Park offers a variety of different forms of entertainment for adolescents and adults.

Taste of Orland Park is an event that part takes every year within a span of three days in the beginning of August. The event caters food/drinks, live music, and activities. As of 2025, the event has been up and running for 22 years. Taste of Orland Park is located in the Village Center (14700 S. Ravinia Ave. Orland Park, Illinois 60462).

Independence Day celebrations are celebrated every Fourth of July in Orland Park. Firework shows, Veteran Liberty Fun Run and Walk, parades, concerts, and more are held between July 3rd and 4th in Centennial Park West. This celebration contains food/drinks, activities, and firework shows.

== Government and politics ==
=== Government ===
Orland Park is contained in the Illinois's 6th congressional district, which is currently represented by Sean Casten (D).

The village maintained an Aa2 bond rating from Moody's and an AA+ rating from Standard and Poor's. These are among the best bond ratings in the Chicago suburbs.(Page 12)

The elected Board of Trustees makes local legislation for the village. The elected officials include the village president (who also serves as mayor), village clerk, and six village trustees, each of whom is elected at large to a four-year term.

Orland Park elected officials
Name	Elected position
James Dodge	Mayor and Village President
Mary Ryan Norwell	Village Clerk
Cynthia Nelson Katsenes	Trustee
William R. Healy	Trustee
Michael R. Milani	Trustee
Dina M. Lawrence	Trustee
John Lawler	Trustee
Joanna M. Liotine Leafblad	Trustee

=== Politics ===
Both main US political parties are competitive on the local level with Keith Pekau defeating longtime mayor Dan Mclaughlin (D) in 2017. In recent years, the GOP has been able to flip the village board and other elected positions in the village. On April 1, 2025, James Dodge defeated incumbent Keith Pekau in the Orland Park mayoral race.

=== Covid-19 pandemic ===
Orland Park and then mayor, Keith Pekau, were defiant against state and county mandates during the COVID-19 pandemic. When Illinois Governor J.B. Pritzker ordered a lockdown of businesses and social activities, Pekau led the village in a lawsuit against Pritzker in federal court. Although the court ruled in favor of Pritzker's orders, leading Pekau to drop the lawsuit, Pekau and other village trustees remained opposed to mask mandates. When Cook County passed a mandate requiring restaurants, gyms, and other businesses to verify the vaccination status of customers, the board passed a resolution opposing the mandate and refusing to enforce it in Orland Park.

== Education ==
In Cook County, Orland Park is served by four grammar school districts, Orland School District #135 (7 primary schools, 3 middle schools: Century Junior High, Jerling Junior High, and Orland Junior High), Community Consolidated School District #146 (4 primary schools, and Central Middle School), Palos School District 118 (2 primary schools, and Palos South Middle School), and Kirby School District #140 (5 primary schools, 2 middle schools: Prairie View Middle School, and Virgil I Grissom Middle School). A majority of Orland Park is within Orland School District #135. All parts in Cook County are the Consolidated High School District 230. Carl Sandburg High School is and has been associated with Orland Park. It was outside of the city limits until the village annexed it in 2002. Sandburg's attendance boundary covers the majority of the municipality. Some parts to the north are in a choice zone which has Amos Alonzo Stagg High School in Palos Hills as the default high school, but allows Sandburg to be an option. Other parts of the municipality are zoned to Stagg or to Victor J. Andrew High School in Tinley Park.

In Will County, Mokena School District 159 and Lincoln Way Community High School District 210 cover residential areas in Orland Park.

St. Michael School of the Roman Catholic Archdiocese of Chicago is in Orland Park. A number of other parochial schools in the region provide bus service for Orland Park students.

A number of higher education facilities are in the village. St. Xavier University formerly operated a satellite campus in Orland Park, as did the ITT Technical Institute until its closing in September 2016. Robert Morris University (Illinois) has both an Orland Park campus as well as a second facility in the village, the culinary arts school, until they were closed as a result of its merger with Roosevelt University. Community college education is offered at Moraine Valley Community College, in nearby Palos Hills.

Sixty percent of Orland Park households have someone with at least a bachelor's degree, with a significant number of residents having completed postgraduate work.

== Media ==
Local cable television channel Orland Park TV can be viewed on AT&T UVerse Channel 99 and Comcast Channel 4.

== Transportation ==
Orland Park has three stops on Metra's SouthWest Service, which provides weekday rail service between Manhattan, Illinois, and Chicago Union Station): 143rd Street, 153rd Street, and 179th Street.

Pace provides bus service on multiple routes connecting Orland Park to destinations throughout the Southland.

Major highway transportation corridors are:

- I-80 southern border of Orland Park
- US 45 (La Grange Road) major north–south thoroughfare
- IL 43 (Harlem Avenue) near the eastern border of Orland Park
- US 6 (159th Street) major east–west thoroughfare
- IL 7 another major north–south thoroughfare
- CR B59 (167th Street) located entirely in Orland Park.

== Notable people ==
- Jeff Alm, defensive tackle for the Houston Oilers
- Scarlett Bordeaux, professional wrestler and model
- Alex Broadhurst, professional hockey player
- John Cangelosi, outfielder for seven Major League Baseball teams
- Connor Carrick, ice hockey defenseman, played on numerous NHL teams
- John Chiang, former California State Treasurer
- David Gust, right-wing for the Rockford Icehogs
- Connor Carrick, defenseman for the New Jersey Devils
- Dan Feeney, guard for the Tampa Bay Buccaneers
- Pat Fitzgerald, head football coach for Michigan State University, former head football coach for Northwestern University
- Evita Griskenas, rhythmic gymnast and two time olympian
- Buddy Guy, blues singer and guitarist
- Dan Hampton, defensive end and tackle for Chicago Bears; Super Bowl champion (XX)
- Justin Hartley, actor (Passions, Smallville, This Is Us, starring in Tracker)
- Joel Hoekstra, musician and guitarist, toured with Cher, Trans-Siberian Orchestra, and Whitesnake
- Dylan Jacobs, distance runner
- Sarah Kustok, sports reporter for the YES Network and Fox Sports
- Zak Kustok, businessman and quarterback for the Northwestern Wildcats
- Michelle L'amour, burlesque performer
- Steve Martinson, right-wing for the Detroit Red Wings, Montreal Canadiens, and Minnesota North Stars
- Tim McCarthy, retired Orland Park police chief; Secret Service agent, took bullet meant for Ronald Reagan during assassination attempt on March 30, 1981
- Michael McDermott (musician), folk/rock singer/songwriter, guitarist
- Mary Therese McDonnell, defender for the Republic of Ireland women's national football team
- Shannon McDonnell, midfielder for the Republic of Ireland women's national football team
- Marie Newman, former U.S. Representative for Illinois's 3rd congressional district
- Hemant Mehta, atheist and author (I Sold My Soul on eBay)
- Bill Rancic, winner of The Apprentice season 1
- Katie Rich, comedian, writer for Saturday Night Live
- Ken Rutkowski, syndicated radio talk show host, Business Rockstars
- Michael Schofield, offensive tackle for numerous NFL teams including the Super Bowl 50 champion Denver Broncos
- Robin Tunney, actress (The Mentalist, The Craft, Vertical Limit, Prison Break)
- Lukas Verzbicas, long-distance runner and triathlete; first runner to win both FLCC and NXN in the same year; alum of Carl Sandburg High School (2011)
- Whethan, DJ and music producer
- Jed Zayner, soccer player
- Ronald Zinn, Olympic racewalker

== See also ==
- Orland Square Mall
- Cooper's Hawk Winery & Restaurants
