= South Inter-Conference Association =

Defunct high school sports league in Illinois

- Founded: 1972
- Folded: 2006
- Divisions: Central, East, North, South, West
- No. of teams: 36
- Region: Chicagoland

The South Inter-Conference Association is a former high school umbrella conference organizing extracurricular sporting activities in the southern portion of Cook, portions of Kendall and throughout Will and Kankakee Counties in Illinois. SICA is the predecessor competitive body of the current South Suburban Conference, Southwest Suburban Conference, and Southland Athletic Conference. At one point it was the largest conference in Illinois.

== History ==
Origins of the South-Inter Conference Association (SICA) date back to 1972 when 26 schools chartered one of the largest conferences in the state of Illinois. The 26 high schools included; Bloom, Bradley, Bremen, Crete-Monee, Eisenhower, Evergreen Park, Hillcrest, Homewood-Flossmoor, Kankakee Eastridge, Kankakee Westview, Lincoln-Way, Oak Forest, Oak Lawn, Reavis, Rich Central, Rich East, Rich South, Richards, Sandburg, Stagg, Thornridge, Thornton, Thornton Fractional North, Thornton Fractional South, Thornwood, and Tinley Park. The schools were sorted into five divisions and would continue to grow throughout the end of the 20th century. In 1976, Bloom Trail and Shepard opened their doors and were added to the league. Argo moved over from the Illini 8 in 1977 and the same year, Victor J. Andrew High School opened, taking the total number of teams to 30 to close out the 1970's.

In 1982, Evergreen Park would leave the league, however, Bolingbrook, Lockport and Romeoville would join the conference. Joliet Central and Joliet West would migrate from the defunct Illini 8 Conference in 1983 and during that same year, Kankakee Eastridge and Kankakee Westview would consolidate into Kankakee High School, making the total number of schools 33, the largest total the conference would ever achieve. For 10 years the conference maintained but in 1993, both Joliet schools would consolidate into Joliet Township, again dropping the total number of schools to 32. Bloom Trail would leave the league in 1995, however, Lincoln-Way East would open their doors in 2001, joining the conference in the process.

For 33 years the SICA maintained a membership of 33 schools split into five divisions. The conference covered a large geographic area and sociological spectrum "from the Indiana border to Joliet, from impoverished Ford Heights to affluent Frankfort, from virtually all-black Hillcrest to almost all-white Lincoln-Way Central and from Joliet, enrollment 4,993, to 1,066- student Rich South" In 2004, the athletic directors voted 30–3, the principals' board of control voted 6–2, and the district superintendents voted 16–3 to approve a new conference realignment which was to take effect in 2006. The realignment had been pushed because of long travel times and a reduction of sports offerings at some schools. The realignment split the association into three roughly equal and geographically contiguous conferences, one of which, the southeast, contained most of the predominantly African–American schools (compared to one school in the remaining two conferences). It was from these schools that a majority of the votes against the realignment had come. Leaders from these schools demanded an investigation from the Office of the Illinois Attorney General, and petitioned the Illinois State Board of Education to investigate as to whether this action violated rules on equity.

In March 2005, ten schools announced that they were unilaterally leaving SICA to form a new conference, the Southwest Suburban Conference. Those schools included; Andrew, Bolingbrook, Bradley, Homewood-Flossmoor, Joliet Township, Lincoln-Way Central, Lincoln-Way East, Lockport, Sandburg and Stagg. These ten schools collectively were among the largest in student population. Shortly after the announcement, a board member from Lincoln-Way Community High School District, a district representing two of the schools leaving to form a new conference, was forced to resign after racially insensitive statements were left on a reporter's voice mail.

Shortly after this, twelve more schools split off to form the South Suburban Conference. Those schools included; Argo, Bremen, Eisenhower, Evergreen Park, Hillcrest, Lemont, Oak Forest, Oak Lawn, Reavis, Richards, Shepard, and Tinley Park,.

In April 2006, a federal civil rights lawsuit was filed against the schools which had left claiming that "(an) apartheid-like realignment used public funds to regress to separate but equal". The suit was settled out of court with the three schools of Thornton Township High Schools District 205 joining the Southwest Suburban Conference, and the two schools of Thornton Fractional Township High School District 215 joining the South Suburban Conference. The remaining six teams would be known as Southland Athletic Conference. Those schools included; Bloom, Crete-Monee, Kankakee, Rich Central, Rich East and Rich South.

== Former Schools ==
Central	East	North
Bremen High School	Bloom Township	Argo Community High School
Shepard High School	Homewood-Flossmoor High School	Bolingbrook High School
Hillcrest High School	Eisenhower High School	Oak Lawn Community High School
Oak Forest High School	Thornridge High School	Reavis High School
T.F. North High School	Thornton High School	Richards High School
T.F. South High School	Thornwood High School	Romeoville High School
Tinley Park High School	Bloom Trail High School	Evergreen Park Community High School
South	West	
Bradley High School	Andrew High School	
Crete-Monee High School	Carl Sandburg High School	
Kankakee High School	Joliet High School	
Rich Central High School	Lincoln-Way Central High School	
Rich East High School	Lincoln-Way East High School	
Rich South High School	Lockport Township High School	
Stagg High School
Joliet West High School

== Membership timeline ==
This timeline represents the 35 schools that were a part of the SICA as well as the conferences they have moved to since the league disbanded.

South Inter-Conference Association (SICA) South Suburban Conference Southland Athletic Conference Southwest Suburban Conference Original Southwest Suburban Conference Southwest Prairie Conference Suburban Prairie Conference Northeast Conference
