= South Suburban Conference (Illinois) =

High school sports conference

- Conference: IHSA
- Founded: 2006
- Sports fielded: 12 boys, 12 girls
- No. of teams: 14
- Region: Chicagoland

The South Suburban Conference (SSC) is a high school athletic and activity conference which comprises fourteen schools located in the south and southwest suburbs of Chicago, Illinois.

The conference was one of three (the Southwest Suburban Conference (SWSC) and Southland Athletic Conference) to be carved from the long extant South Inter-Conference Association (SICA); a large athletic conference which broke apart in 2005 after 33 years of existence.

Current locations of South Suburban Conference Schools

== History ==
The "original" incarnation of the South Suburban Conference dates back to 1927 when a group of six schools maintained ties from the original Suburban Conference which had folded that same year. Those original members included Bloom, Blue Island, Chicago University, Kankakee, Thornton Fractional and Thornton. The league continued to add schools as time moved forward with Argo joining in 1938 and Lockport in 1939. University High School left in 1939, leaving a league that maintained seven schools for 14 years.

The south suburbs continued to grow in popularity with school districts becoming larger and populations increasing. So, in 1952, Leyden High School joined the conference making the total number of schools eight. However, in 1957, Thornton Fractional would split into North and South and Leyden would also be split into East and West and all four schools would leave the conference. This exodus would drop the conference total to six schools. In 1960, Joliet joined from the Big 8 and newly opened Thornridge High School was added to the league as well. 1962 witnessed the name change of Blue Island High School to Dwight D. Eisenhower High School. In 1964, Joliet split into three separate schools; Central, East and West making this version of the conference the biggest it would ever become, 10 schools.

Another mass exodus would occur in 1966 as Argo, Kankakee, Lockport and all three Joliet schools left in order to join the newly chartered Illini 8 Conference. The reduction of schools forced the league to reach out for additional members, however, Richards, a brand new high school, was the only team to join. The last team to join this original version of the South Suburban was Thornwood in 1972, the same year the school opened. Unfortunately, this would be the final year for this version of the South Suburban with several teams joining the newly formed South Inter-Conference Association (SICA). Those schools included Argo, Bloom, Eisenhower, Joliet Central, Joliet West, Kankakee, Lockport, Richards, Thornridge, Thornton, Thornton Fractional North and South and Thornwood.

For 33 years prior to 2006, most of the public high schools in the south and southwest suburban Chicago area were a part of the South Inter-Conference Association (SICA) which by 2005 had reached a membership of 33 schools split into five divisions. The conference covered a large geographic area and sociological spectrum "from the Indiana border to Joliet, from impoverished Ford Heights to affluent Frankfort, from virtually all-black Hillcrest to almost all-white Lincoln-Way Central and from Joliet, enrollment 4,993, to 1,066- student Rich South" In 2004, the athletic directors voted 30–3, the principals' board of control voted 6–2, and the district superintendents voted 16–3 to approve a new conference realignment which was to take effect in 2006. The realignment had been pushed because of long travel times and a reduction of sports offerings at some schools. The realignment split the association into three roughly equal and geographically contiguous conferences, one of which, the southeast, contained most of the predominantly African–American schools (compared to one school in the remaining two conferences). It was from these schools that a majority of the votes against the realignment had come. Leaders from these schools demanded an investigation from the Office of the Illinois Attorney General, and petitioned the Illinois State Board of Education to investigate as to whether this action violated rules on equity.

In March 2005, ten schools announced that they were unilaterally leaving SICA to form a new conference, the Southwest Suburban Conference. Those schools included; Andrew, Bolingbrook, Bradley, Homewood-Flossmoor, Joliet Township, Lincoln-Way Central, Lincoln-Way East, Lockport, Sandburg and Stagg. These ten schools collectively were among the largest in student population. Shortly after the announcement, a board member from Lincoln-Way Community High School District, a district representing two of the schools leaving to form a new conference, was forced to resign after racially insensitive statements were left on a reporter's voice mail.

Shortly after this, twelve more schools split off to form the South Suburban Conference. Those schools included; Argo, Bremen, Eisenhower, Evergreen Park, Hillcrest, Lemont, Oak Forest, Oak Lawn, Reavis, Richards, Shepard, and Tinley Park,.

In April 2006, a federal civil rights lawsuit was filed against the schools which had left claiming that "(an) apartheid-like realignment used public funds to regress to separate but equal". The suit was settled out of court with the three schools of Thornton Township High Schools District 205 joining the Southwest Suburban Conference, and the two schools of Thornton Fractional Township High School District 215 joining the South Suburban Conference. The remaining six teams would be known as Southland Athletic Conference. Those schools included; Bloom, Crete-Monee, Kankakee, Rich Central, Rich East and Rich South.

== Members ==
There are 14 members of the conference.

School name	Division	Town	Area	Team name	Colors	County
Alan B. Shepard High School	Red	Palos Heights	South Suburbs	Astros		Cook
Argo Community High School	Red	Summit	South Suburbs	Argonauts		Cook
Bremen High School	Blue	Midlothian	South Suburbs	Braves		Cook
Dwight D. Eisenhower High School	Red	Blue Island	South Suburbs	Cardinals		Cook
Evergreen Park Community High School	Red	Evergreen Park	South Suburbs	Mustangs		Cook
Richards High School	Red	Oak Lawn	South Suburbs	Bulldogs		Cook
Hillcrest High School	Blue	Country Club Hills	South Suburbs	Hawks		Cook
Lemont High School	Blue	Lemont	South Suburbs	None		Cook
Oak Lawn Community High School	Red	Oak Lawn	South Suburbs	Spartans		Cook
Oak Forest High School	Blue	Oak Forest	South Suburbs	Bengals		Cook
Reavis High School	Red	Burbank	South Suburbs	Rams		Cook
Thornton Fractional North High School	Blue	Calumet City	South Suburbs	Meteors		Cook
Thornton Fractional South High School	Blue	Lansing	South Suburbs	Redwolves		Cook
Tinley Park High School	Blue	Tinley Park	South Suburbs	Titans		Cook

== Sports and activities ==
The conference sponsors competition in the following sports:

- Badminton (girls)
- Baseball (boys)
- Basketball (boys & girls)
- Bowling (boys & girls)
- Cheerleading (girls)
- Cross Country (boys & girls)
- Competitive Dance (boys & girls)
- Football (boys)
- Golf (boys & girls)
- Lacrosse (boys)
- Soccer (boys & girls)
- Softball (girls)
- Swimming & Diving (boys & girls)
- Tennis (boys & girls)
- Track & Field (boys & girls)
- Volleyball (boys & girls)
- Wrestling (boys)

== Membership timeline ==
Original South Suburban Conference Current South Suburban Conference South Inter-Conference Association (SICA) Southeast Suburban Conference) Illini 8 Conference Southland Athletic Conference Southwest Suburban Conference Suburban Prairie Conference Northeast Conference Original Southwest Suburban Conference
