= Southwest Suburban Conference =

Chicago suburban public secondary school conference

- Conference: IHSA
- Founded: 2005
- Sports fielded: 17 (14 boys', 14 girls')
- No. of teams: 9
- Region: Southern Chicagoland

Current locations of Southwest Suburban Conference Schools

The Southwest Suburban Conference is an athletic and competitive activity conference consisting of public secondary schools located in the south and southwest suburbs of Chicago, Illinois.

The conference was formed in 2005 when most of these schools split off from the South Inter-Conference Association (SICA). The division resulted in a lawsuit claiming that schools that were majority white in population were abandoning the schools which were majority black. The lawsuit was eventually settled and paved the way for the conference to expand.

== History ==
For 33 years prior to 2006, most of the public high schools in the south and southwest suburban Chicago area were a part of the South Inter-Conference Association (SICA) which by 2005 had reached a membership of 33 schools split into five divisions. The conference covered a large geographic area and sociological spectrum "from the Indiana border to Joliet, from impoverished Ford Heights to affluent Frankfort, from virtually all-black Hillcrest to almost all-white Lincoln-Way Central and from Joliet, enrollment 4,993, to 1,066- student Rich South" In 2004, the athletic directors voted 30–3, the principals' board of control voted 6–2, and the district superintendents voted 16–3 to approve a new conference realignment which was to take effect in 2006. The realignment had been pushed because of long travel times and a reduction of sports offerings at some schools. The realignment split the association into three roughly equal and geographically contiguous conferences, one of which, the southeast, contained most of the predominantly African–American schools (compared to one school in the remaining two conferences). It was from these schools that a majority of the votes against the realignment had come. Leaders from these schools demanded an investigation from the Office of the Illinois Attorney General, and petitioned the Illinois State Board of Education to investigate as to whether this action violated rules on equity.

In March 2005, ten schools announced that they were unilaterally leaving SICA to form a new conference, the Southwest Suburban Conference. Those schools included; Andrew, Bolingbrook, Bradley, Homewood-Flossmoor, Joliet Township, Lincoln-Way Central, Lincoln-Way East, Lockport, Sandburg and Stagg. These ten schools collectively were among the largest in student population. Shortly after the announcement, Lincoln-Way Community High School District board member Maureen Jagmin, whose district represented two of the schools leaving to form a new conference, was forced to resign after she left racist statements on a reporter's voice mail.

Shortly after this, twelve more schools split off to form the South Suburban Conference. Those schools included; Argo, Bremen, Eisenhower, Evergreen Park, Hillcrest, Lemont, Oak Forest, Oak Lawn, Reavis, Richards, Shepard, and Tinley Park,.

In April 2006, a federal civil rights lawsuit was filed against the schools which had left claiming that "(an) apartheid-like realignment used public funds to regress to separate but equal". The suit was settled out of court with the three schools of Thornton Township High Schools District 205 joining the Southwest Suburban Conference, and the two schools of Thornton Fractional Township High School District 215 joining the South Suburban Conference. The remaining six teams would be known as Southland Athletic Conference. Those schools included; Bloom, Crete-Monee, Kankakee, Rich Central, Rich East and Rich South.

Starting in 2019–20, Thornridge High School, Thornton Township High School, and Thornwood High School left the conference to join the Southland Athletic Conference.

Starting in 2024–25, Bolingbrook High School will leave the conference to join the Southwest Prairie Conference.

== Member schools ==
School	Town	Area	Team Name	Colors	IHSA Classes (2/3/4) (Note: The state series class which a school competes in not only depends on the school's student population, but on the sport or activity. Some activities divide schools into two classes, some into three, and others into four. The listing here is in the order of two class, three class, and four class. The more "A"s in a class, the larger the schools competing. For more information on this, see Illinois High School Association#State Series Format.) (Note: Schools are not assigned a classification for football until they have qualified for the playoffs each year. A school's classification not only depends on their student population, but on the populations of the other schools who have qualified. Thus, some schools routinely move between classes. SWSC schools are routinely in the highest classes; 8A, 7A, or 6A.)	Reference
Victor J. Andrew High School	Tinley Park	Southwest Suburbs	Thunderbolts		AA/3A/4A	
Carl Sandburg High School	Orland Park	Southwest Suburbs	Eagles		AA/3A/4A	
Homewood-Flossmoor High School	Flossmoor	South Suburbs	Vikings		AA/3A/4A	
Lincoln-Way Central High School	New Lenox	Southwest Suburbs	Knights		AA/3A/4A	
Lincoln-Way East High School	Frankfort	Southwest Suburbs	Griffins		AA/3A/4A	
Lincoln-Way West High School	New Lenox	Southwest Suburbs	Warriors		AA/2A/3A	
Lockport Township High School	Lockport	Southwest Suburbs	Porters		AA/3A/4A	
Bradley-Bourbonnais Community High School	Bradley	East Illinois	Boilermakers		AA/3A/4A	
Amos Alonzo Stagg High School	Palos Hills	Southwest Suburbs	Chargers		AA/3A/4A	

== Membership timeline ==
This timeline represents the current schools within the Southwest Suburban Conference that were a part of the SICA..

Southwest Suburban Conference South Inter-Conference Association (SICA) Southland Athletic Conference Southwest Prairie Conference

== Sports ==
The conference sponsors competition for young men and young women in basketball, bowling, cross country, golf, gymnastics, soccer, swimming & diving, tennis, track & field, volleyball, water polo. The conference also sponsors competition for young men in baseball, football, and wrestling; and for young women badminton, cheerleading, and softball.

== Activities ==
The conference sponsors competition in Individual Events, Chess, Drama and Group Interpretation.

== State placers ==
Since 2005, the following teams and activities have finished in the top four of their respective IHSA sponsored state tournaments:

- Badminton: 4th place (Andrew: 2007–08, 08–09); 3rd place (Andrew: 2005–06); 2nd place (Andrew: 2006–07; Lincoln-Way Central: 2007–08, 08–09)
- Basketball (boys): 4th place (Thornwood: 2005–06); 3rd place (Thornton: 2008–09)
- Basketball (girls): 2nd place (Bolingbrook: 2006–07, 07–08); State Champions (Bolingbrook: 2005–06, 08–09)
- Bowling (boys): 3rd place (Lincoln-Way East: 2006–07; Lincoln-Way Central: 2007–08, 2017–2018); State Champions (Andrew: 2005–06)
- Cross Country (boys): 4th place (Sandburg: 2006–07)
- Cheerleading: 3rd place (Bradley-Bourbonnais: 2006–07; Sandburg: 07–08); 2nd place (Bradley-Bourbonnais: 2007–08, 08–09); State Champions (Sandburg: 2005–06, 08–09)
- Drama: State Champions (Thornridge: 2005) 2nd Place (Thornridge: 2006); (Homewood-Flossmoor:2012) Fourth Place (Homewood-Flossmoor: 2007,2010)
- Football: State Champions (Lincoln-Way East: 2005, 2017, 2019); (Bolingbrook 2011)
- Group Interpretation: State Champions (Homewood-Flossmoor:2007); (Thornwood: 2006, 2009) 2nd Place (Homewood-Flossmoor: 2008,2010,2011); (Thornwood: 2007) 3rd Place (Thornwood: 2005); (Thornton:2013); (Homewood-Flossmoor: 2012) 4th Place (Thornwood:2010); (Homewood-Flossmoor: 2006); (Thornton:2011)
- Golf (girls): 2nd place (Homewood-Flossmoor: 2008–09)
- Gymnastics (boys): "State Champions" (Lincoln-Way Co-Op: 2011); 4th place (Lincoln-Way Co-Op: 2006–07); 2nd place (Lincoln-Way Co-Op: 2007–08)
- Gymnastics (girls): 2nd place (Sandburg: 2008–09)
- Scholastic Bowl: 4th place (Sandburg: 2017-18)
- Soccer (girls): 4th place (Lincoln-Way Central: 2006–07); 3rd place (Sandburg: 2008–09)
- Softball: State Champions(Lincoln-Way Central: 2008)
- Track & Field (girls): "State Champions" (Lincoln-Way East: 2013, 2014, 2015, 2016, 2021); 3rd place (Thornton: 2006–07)
- Volleyball (boys): 2nd Place (Lincoln-Way North: 2013); 4th place, 1st place (Lincoln-Way East: 2006–07, 2014)
- Water Polo (boys): 4th place (Sandburg: 2007–08); 2nd place (Sandburg: 2008–09)
- Wrestling: 4th place (Lincoln-Way Central: 2012–2013);3rd place (Lincoln-Way Central: 2007–08); State Champions (Sandburg 2005–06, 06–07)
