= Thornton Township High School District =

Thornton Township High School District may refer to:

- Thornton Township High Schools District 205
- Thornton Fractional Township High School District 215
