= Southland Athletic Conference =

- Conference: IHSA
- Founded: 2006
- No. of teams: 7
- Region: South and Southwest suburbs of Chicago, Illinois

Current locations of Southland Athletic Conference Schools

The Southland Athletic Conference (SAC) is a high school athletic and activity conference which comprises seven schools located in the south and southwest suburbs of Chicago, Illinois.

The conference was one of three (the Southwest Suburban Conference (SWSC) and South Suburban Conference (SSC) to be carved from the long extant South Inter-Conference Association (SICA); a large athletic conference which broke apart in 2005 after 33 years of existence.

== History ==
For 33 years prior to 2006, most of the public high schools in the south and southwest suburban Chicago area were a part of the South Inter-Conference Association (SICA) which by 2005 had reached a membership of 33 schools split into five divisions. The conference covered a large geographic area and sociological spectrum "from the Indiana border to Joliet, from impoverished Ford Heights to affluent Frankfort, from virtually all-black Hillcrest to almost all-white Lincoln-Way Central and from Joliet, enrollment 4,993, to 1,066- student Rich South" In 2004, the athletic directors voted 30–3, the principals' board of control voted 6–2, and the district superintendents voted 16–3 to approve a new conference realignment which was to take effect in 2006. The realignment had been pushed because of long travel times and a reduction of sports offerings at some schools. The realignment split the association into three roughly equal and geographically contiguous conferences, one of which, the southeast, contained most of the predominantly African–American schools (compared to one school in the remaining two conferences). It was from these schools that a majority of the votes against the realignment had come. Leaders from these schools demanded an investigation from the Office of the Illinois Attorney General, and petitioned the Illinois State Board of Education to investigate as to whether this action violated rules on equity.

In March 2005, ten schools announced that they were unilaterally leaving SICA to form a new conference, the Southwest Suburban Conference. Those schools included; Andrew, Bolingbrook, Bradley, Homewood-Flossmoor, Joliet Township, Lincoln-Way Central, Lincoln-Way East, Lockport, Sandburg and Stagg. These ten schools collectively were among the largest in student population. Shortly after the announcement, a board member from Lincoln-Way Community High School District, a district representing two of the schools leaving to form a new conference, was forced to resign after racially insensitive statements were left on a reporter's voice mail.

Shortly after this, twelve more schools split off to form the South Suburban Conference. Those schools included; Argo, Bremen, Eisenhower, Evergreen Park, Hillcrest, Lemont, Oak Forest, Oak Lawn, Reavis, Richards, Shepard, and Tinley Park,.

In April 2006, a federal civil rights lawsuit was filed against the schools which had left claiming that "(an) apartheid-like realignment used public funds to regress to separate but equal". The suit was settled out of court with the three schools of Thornton Township High Schools District 205 joining the Southwest Suburban Conference, and the two schools of Thornton Fractional Township High School District 215 joining the South Suburban Conference. The remaining six teams would be known as Southland Athletic Conference. Those schools included; Bloom, Crete-Monee, Kankakee, Rich Central, Rich East and Rich South.

In 2019–20, Thornridge, Thornton, and Thornwood left the Southwest Suburban Conference to join the Southland Conference. In 2020, Rich East High School closes while Rich South and Rich Central consolidate into Rich Township High School

== Members ==
School	City	Area	Team Name	Colors
Bloom Township High School^{1}	Chicago Heights/Steger	South Suburbs	Blazing Trojans	
Crete-Monee High School	Crete	South Suburbs	Warriors	
Kankakee High School	Kankakee	East Illinois	Kays	
Rich Township High School^{2}	Olympia Fields/Richton Park	South Suburbs	Raptors	
Thornridge High School	Dolton	South Suburbs	Falcons	
Thornton Township High School	Harvey	South Suburbs	Wildcats	
Thornwood High School	South Holland	South Suburbs	Thunderbirds	

== Membership timeline ==
This timeline represents the current schools within the Southland Athletic Conference that were a part of the SICA.

Southland Athletic Conference South Inter-Conference Association (SICA) Southwest Suburban Conference South Suburban Conference

== Notes ==
1. Bloom Township High School is a unified team of Bloom High School in Chicago Heights, Illinois and Bloom Trail High School in Steger, Illinois.
2. Rich Township High School is a unified team that combines the schools of RTHS Fine Arts & Communications Campus (previously known as Rich South) in Richton Park, Illinois and RTHS STEM Campus (previously known as Rich Central) in Olympia Fields, Illinois.
