= Darrell Campbell =

American gridiron football player (born 1981)

No. 90, 94
- Position: Defensive line

Personal information
- Born: July 6, 1981 (age 45); Chicago, Illinois, U.S.
- Listed height: 6 ft 4 in (1.93 m)
- Listed weight: 300 lb (136 kg)

Career information
- High school: Thornwood (South Holland, Illinois)
- College: Notre Dame
- NFL draft: 2004: undrafted

Career history
- Chicago Bears (2004–2005); Cleveland Browns (2006)*; Tampa Bay Buccaneers (2006); Orlando Predators (2008); Baltimore Ravens (2008)*; Montreal Alouettes (2009); Philadelphia Soul (2011); Chicago Rush (2012–2013); Arizona Rattlers (2014)*; Portland Thunder (2014)*
- * Offseason or practice squad member only

Awards and highlights
- Grey Cup champion (2009)

Career AFL statistics
- Tackles: 35
- Sacks: 15.5
- Pass Breakups: 3
- Forced Fumbles: 4
- Fumble Recoveries: 2
- Stats at ArenaFan.com

Darrell Campbell (born July 6, 1981) is an American former professional football defensive tackle.

== Early life ==
Darrell attended Thornwood High School in South Holland, Illinois, where he was a participant in football, track, wrestling, basketball, soccer and baseball. As a football player, he earned three letters in football, serving as captain and earning team MVP honors each of the last three seasons. He made 67 solo tackles as senior in 1998, along with 13 tackles for loss and four sacks. Played defensive end as sophomore, inside linebacker as junior and nose guard as senior. As a result, he was named USA Today honorable mention prep All-American pick, rated 82nd nationally on Chicago Sun-Times list of top 100 players, named first-team all-state pick in Illinois by Chicago Tribune, and named top player in SICA Blue. As a track & field participant, he was state qualifier.

== College career ==
After high school, Campbell signed a letter of intent to play college football at the University of Notre Dame where he would play for coaches Bob Davie and Tyrone Willingham. He enrolled in College of Arts and Letters, majoring in English and computer applications. During his senior season at Notre Dame in 2002, Campbell started all 13 games and recorded 30 tackles (7 for a loss) and 5 sacks.

== Professional career ==
=== Chicago Bears ===
Campbell was signed by Chicago Bears as an un-drafted rookie free agent and spent the 2005 season on the practice squad.

=== Cleveland Browns ===
Began the 2006 season with the Cleveland Browns, but was released.

=== Tampa Bay Buccaneers ===
Later in 2006, he was signed to the Tampa Bay Buccaneers practice squad.

=== Orlando Predators ===
Played for the Orlando Predators, of the Arena Football League, in 2008. During his 8 games with the Predators, he recorded 19 total tackles, 1.5 sacks and 1 fumble recovery.

=== Baltimore Ravens ===
After the AFL season, he went back to the NFL when he attended Baltimore Ravens training camp and played in pre-season games, but failed to make the team.

=== Montreal Alouettes ===
In 2009, Campbell signed with the Montreal Alouettes of the Canadian Football League. The Alouettes went on to have a great season, as they won the 97th Grey Cup. Campbell was released after the season.

=== Philadelphia Soul ===
In 2011, Campbell was signed by the Philadelphia Soul of the AFL.

=== Chicago Rush ===
Campbell was a member of the Chicago Rush in 2012 & 2013.

=== Arizona Rattlers ===
When the Rush was no longer included in the league's plan for 2014, their players were distributed in a dispersal draft, where Campbell was selected by the Arizona Rattlers.

=== Portland Thunder ===
On December 5, 2013, Campbell was traded by the Rattlers to the expansion Portland Thunder for future considerations.
