= Argo Community High School =

Location
- 7239 W. 63rd Street; Summit, Cook County, Illinois 60501; United States; 41.776°N 87.8046°W

Information
- Opened: 1920
- School district: Argo Community High School District 217
- Superintendent: Brandon Cotter
- Dean: Denise Ghaowi, Chris Kelly, Vince Loizzo
- Principal: Vacant
- Staff: 123.14 (FTE)
- Grades: 9–12
- Gender: Coed
- Enrollment: 1,817 (2024-2025)
  - Grade 9: 407
  - Grade 10: 428
  - Grade 11: 477
  - Grade 12: 505
- Average class size: 22.2
- Student to teacher ratio: 14.76
- Colors: Maroon; White
- Athletics conference: South Suburban Conference
- Nickname: Argonauts
- Accreditation: Illinois State Board of Education
- Newspaper: The Maroon
- Yearbook: Argolite
- Website: www.argohs.net

Argo Community High School is a public four-year high school located in Summit, Illinois, a western suburb of Chicago. The district draws students from the communities of Summit, Bedford Park, Bridgeview, Justice, Willow Springs, and a portion of Hickory Hills. The school was named for the area surrounding the large corn processing plant located near the school, which manufactured Argo corn starch and is currently owned by Ingredion. In 2014 and 2016, Argo was awarded a bronze medal by U.S. News & World Report for outstanding academic performance, the only school in the South Suburban Conference to receive such recognition.

On March 11, 2016, Democratic presidential candidate Bernie Sanders held a campaign rally at Argo that was attended by several thousand people.

On November 14, 2025, then-superintendent William Toulios resigned after an investigation into his usage of his district credit card found thousands of dollars worth of misuse. He was subsequently charged with felony theft of government property by the Cook County State's Attorney.

== Activities ==
Activity
A-Club
Art Club
Chess Club
Choir
Culinary Club
Drama Club / Thespians
Environmental Club
French/Spanish Honor Society
Freshman Class Board
Golden Fleece Play
Instrumental Music
International Club
Junior Class Board
Mathletes
National Hispanic Institute (NHI)
National Honor Society
Newspaper (Maroon)
Sailorette Poms
Radio (WARG)
Scholastic Bowl
Senior Class Board
Sophomore Class Board
Special Olympics
Speech Team
Spring Musical Theater Director
Spring Musical Vocal Director
Spring Musical Instrumental Director
Student Council
STRIIVE
Winter Guard
Winter Percussion
Yearbook (Argolite)

== Athletics ==
Argo competes as a member of the South Suburban Conference. It also competes in state championship series sponsored by the Illinois High School Association (IHSA). School colors are Maroon and White. Teams are called the Argonauts. Argo sponsors interscholastic teams for men and women in basketball, bowling, cross country, golf, soccer, swimming and diving, tennis, track and field, volleyball, water polo and wrestling. There are men's teams in baseball and football and women's teams in badminton and softball.

== Notable alumni ==
- Bob Bercich, a former NFL safety for the Dallas Cowboys.
- Bill Damaschke, an animator and producer who was formerly an executive at DreamWorks.
- Larry Garron, a former NFL fullback for the Boston Patriots.
- Kyle Hill, a former professional basketball player in Europe. He was the second-round draft pick of the Dallas Mavericks in the 2001 NBA draft.
- Johnny Karras, a halfback for the Illinois team that won the 1952 Rose Bowl. He was the second-round choice of the Chicago Cardinals in the 1952 NFL draft.
- Ted Kluszewski, an MLB first baseman (1947–61) who played most of his career with the Cincinnati Reds. In 1998 the Cincinnati Reds retired his number. 1954 He hit three home runs for the Chicago White Sox in the 1959 World Series.
- Damon R. Leichty (class of 1990), district judge
- Sheldon Mallory, a former MLB outfielder for the Oakland Athletics.
- Milan Mrksich (class of 1985), Vice President of Research and Henry Wade Rogers Professor of Biomedical Engineering at Northwestern University
- Dick Portillo (class of 1957), a restaurateur and founder of the Portillo Restaurant Group, the most notable business of which is Portillo's.
- Louis Till, estranged ex-husband of Mamie Till and father of Emmett Till.
- Mamie Till, the fourth black graduate of Argo and mother of Emmett Till, whose murder served as a catalyst in the civil rights movement.
- Saul White Jr. (class of 2004), a professional basketball player who is currently a member of the Harlem Globetrotters
- Mike York (class of 1982), a former MLB pitcher for the Pittsburgh Pirates and the Cleveland Indians
