= Tony Pashos =

American football player (born 1980)

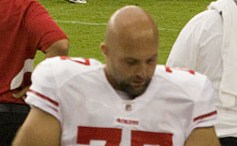
- Pashos with the San Francisco 49ers in 2009

No. 79, 77
- Position: Offensive tackle

Personal information
- Born: August 3, 1980 (age 46); Palos Heights, Illinois, U.S.
- Listed height: 6 ft 7 in (2.01 m)
- Listed weight: 325 lb (147 kg)

Career information
- High school: Lockport Township (IL)
- College: Illinois
- NFL draft: 2003: 5th round, 173rd overall pick

Career history
- Baltimore Ravens (2003–2006); → Cologne Centurions (2004); Jacksonville Jaguars (2007–2008); San Francisco 49ers (2009); Cleveland Browns (2010–2011); Washington Redskins (2013)*; Oakland Raiders (2013)
- * Offseason or practice squad member only

Awards and highlights
- 2× First team All-Big Ten (2001, 2002)

Career NFL statistics
- Games played: 104
- Games started: 82
- Fumble recoveries: 1
- Stats at Pro Football Reference

Anthony George Pashos (born August 3, 1980) is an American former professional football player who was an offensive tackle who played in the National Football League (NFL). He played college football for the Illinois Fighting Illini and was selected by the Baltimore Ravens in the fifth round of the 2003 NFL draft.

Pashos also played for the Cologne Centurions, Jacksonville Jaguars, San Francisco 49ers, Cleveland Browns and Oakland Raiders.

== Early life ==
Born in Palos Heights, Illinois, Pashos attended Lockport Township High School in Lockport, Illinois, and graduated in 1999.

== College career ==
At the University of Illinois Urbana-Champaign, Pashos started all 47 games of his collegiate career at right tackle, beginning in 1999, and was named first-team All-Big Ten in 2001 and 2002.

== Professional career ==
=== Baltimore Ravens ===
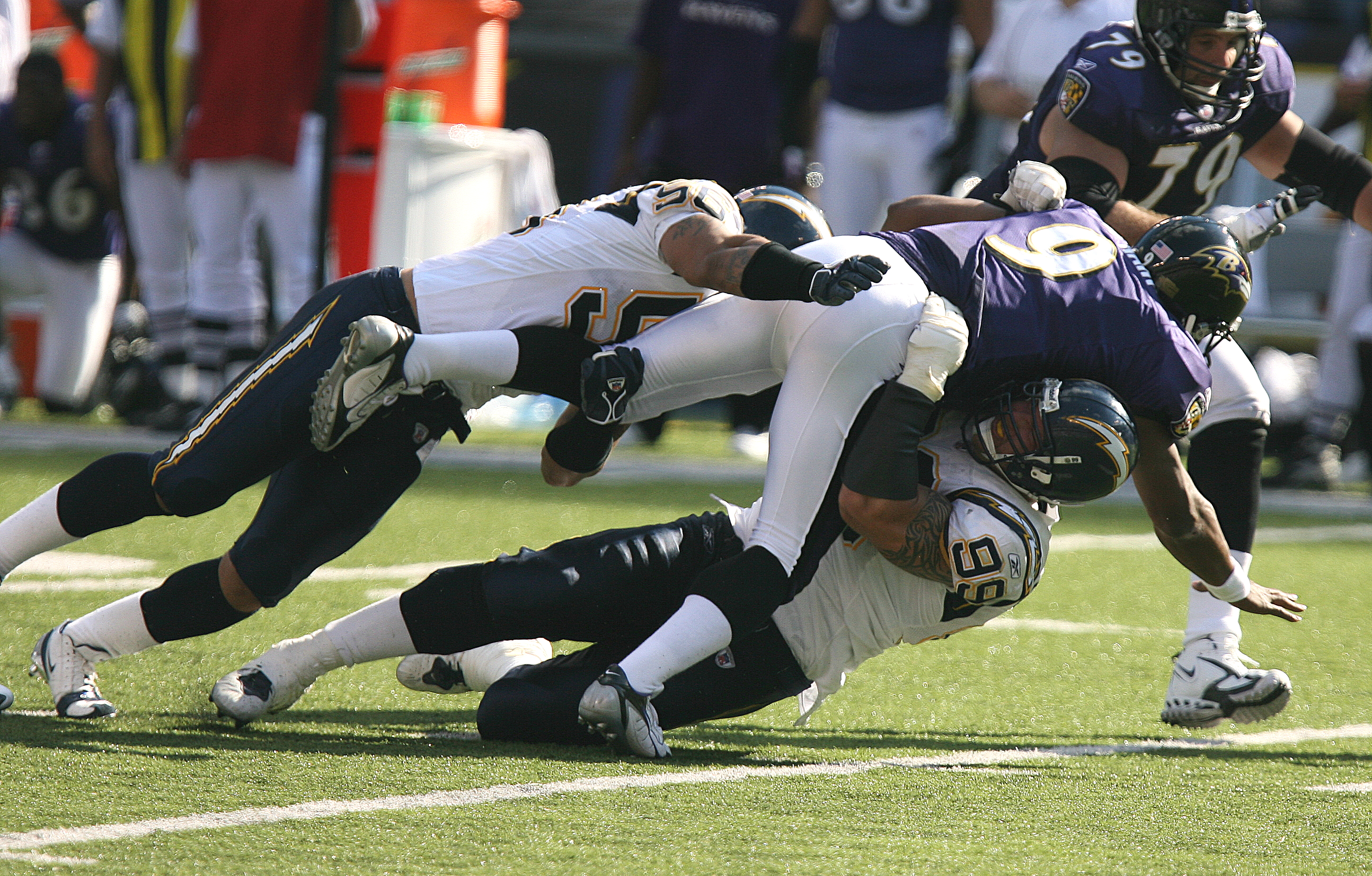
Pashos (top right) blocking for Steve McNair in 2006

Pashos was picked with the 173rd overall selection in the fifth round of the 2003 NFL draft by the Baltimore Ravens. He played in ten games, all starts, for the Cologne Centurions during the 2004 NFL Europe season.

=== Jacksonville Jaguars ===
On March 2, 2007, the Jacksonville Jaguars signed Pashos on the first day of free agency. He started 31 of 32 games for the Jaguars at right tackle. On September 5, 2009, Pashos was cut by the Jaguars to make room for Eben Britton.

=== San Francisco 49ers ===
Pashos signed with the San Francisco 49ers on September 6, 2009.

On October 25, 2009, in a game against the Houston Texans, Pashos fractured his left scapula. He was placed on injured reserve the next day.

=== Cleveland Browns ===
Pashos signed with the Cleveland Browns on March 7, 2010. The Browns released Pashos on March 12, 2012.

=== Washington Redskins ===
Pashos signed with the Washington Redskins on March 11, 2013. The Redskins waived Pashos on August 31, 2013, for final roster cuts before the start of 2013 season.

=== Oakland Raiders ===
He was signed by the Oakland Raiders on September 2, 2013, as an offensive tackle replacing Alex Barron on the 53-man roster.

Since Fall of 2025, Tony Pashos is an assistant coach (lineman) at Providence Catholic High School, in New Lenox, IL.

== Personal life ==
Pashos is the son of Greek immigrants and speaks three languages: Greek, and English. Pashos supported Republican presidential candidate Ron Paul in the 2012 presidential election and Donald Trump in the 2016 presidential election. Tony Pashos is currently living in an estate in Manteno, Illinois. Tony has 3 kids and a wife, Michelle Pashos (43), Kids: Eleni Pashos (14), Melina Pashos (12), and George Pashos (8). Tony is a third-year law student at Northwestern Pritzker School of Law. He interned at the White House in 2018 for his 1L summer.
