= Dandrell Scott =

American rapper

- Born: Chicago, Illinois
- Education: Illinois State University
- Occupations: Actor; voiceover artist; comedian
- Years active: 2014–present
- Notable work: Voiceover actor for Alka-Seltzer (2019 - 2022), Wendy's (2020 - 2024), and Miller Lite (2020 - 2027)
- Website: www.dscottgottalent.com

Dandrell Scott is an American actor, comedian, rapper, and voiceover artist. He is best known for his voiceover work with Wendy's, and their breakfast commercials starting in 2020. In 2024, Dandrell won the “Male Voiceover Artist of the Year” award at the One Voice Awards USA. Broadway World labeled Scott as "a sought-after voice in the industry." Dandrell began his VO career in 2018, voicing commercials for Walmart, Comcast, and Toyota. While performing as a voiceover artist, Scott also landed roles in Chicago P.D., Snowfall and the Chi. Scott's music aspirations followed. In 2020, he released his first studio single, "Faded 2nite," featuring Chicago rapper, Twista. Scott also collaborated with Styles P and Maino for the hip hop song, "Roads."

== Early life ==
Scott attended Thornton Township High School, in Harvey, Illinois and was on the Speech team with actor LaRoyce Hawkins. He participated in Illinois High School Association's Original Comedy event, placing first in the state event in the 2002-2003 year. He graduated in 2003. Scott attended Illinois State University, with a major in Cinema Studies.

== Career ==
In 2016, Scott produced and voiced an animated short film entitled, Hard Knock Robots. The film was nominated for an Audience Choice Award at the 2016 Chicago International REEL Shorts Festival. In 2019, he made his television debut on the syndicated variety show, African American Short Films, for his comedic film, Try My Luck. In the following years, Scott would voice advertisements for Ford Motor Company, Miller Lite, and McDonald's. In 2021, Dandrell was nominated by the Voice Arts Awards for “Outstanding Commercial TV or Web - Best Voiceover.”

== Other ventures ==
In 2017, Scott established a humor t-shirt business, Bad Clothes Company. The brand is sold through Walmart's online marketplace.
