= Lemont High School =

Location
- 800 Porter Street; Lemont, Illinois 60439; United States; 41.6742°N 87.991°W

Information
- School type: Public Secondary
- Established: 1890
- School district: Lemont HS 210
- Superintendent: Dr. Matt Maxwell
- CEEB code: 142590
- Principal: Mr. Eric Michaelsen
- Teaching staff: 85.38 (FTE)
- Grades: 9–12
- Gender: coed
- Enrollment: 1,284 (2024-2025)
  - Grade 9: 304 students
  - Grade 10: 319 students
  - Grade 11: 302 students
  - Grade 12: 359 students
- Average class size: 24
- Student to teacher ratio: 15.04
- Campus size: 30 acres (120,000 m^{2})
- Campus type: Suburban
- Colors: Navy Blue; Gold
- Slogan: Let’s go Lemont
- Fight song: Lemont Loyalty
- Athletics conference: South Suburban
- Team name: None
- Newspaper: Tom-Tom
- Website: www.lhs210.net

Lemont High School, or LHS, is a public four-year high school located in Lemont, Illinois, a southwest suburb of Chicago, Illinois, in the United States. It is the only school of Lemont Township High School District 210, which serves the Village of Lemont and small portions of Woodridge and Downers Grove. LHS also serves as a feeder school for Deaf/Hard-of-hearing students in the area.

== History ==
=== Early beginnings ===
An old surviving document shows graduates in 1891, although Lemont High School was not officially formed until 1906, when five students (four girls and one boy) began meeting for class in the school building located at 410 McCarthy Road. The high school leased three rooms in the building at a rate of $500 per year. The original building is now used for condominiums, but the Central Elementary school is still connected to the East end of the building.

=== Building history ===
By 1925, after many failed attempts, an 18,000-square-foot (1,700 m^{2}) building was finally constructed at 800 Porter Street, where the school is located to this day. The original building cost $125,000 to build and included eight classrooms, a library, a science lab, a home economics room, and a gymnasium.

=== Expansion for growth ===
Student enrollment almost doubled during the 1950s, which in turn led to three expansionary construction projects. Among the new additions were an 11,500-square-foot (1,070 m^{2}) gymnasium (completed in 1950), and 38,000 square feet (3,500 m^{2}) worth of classroom additions (completed by 1959). By the end of the decade, the school was equipped with wood, metal, industrial arts, and electrical shops.

=== Tornado damage in the 1970s ===
After occupying 6.5 acres (26,000 m^{2}) since the late 1920s, Lemont High School expanded to 29 acres (120,000 m^{2}) by 1967, with a significant portion of that land being used for athletic facilities. A $1.1 million project was completed in 1971, which added a new auditorium, kitchen, locker rooms, and more. On June 13, 1976, the school suffered nearly $500,000 in tornado damages. Shortly thereafter, the community passed a bond to rebuild.

=== Growth in the 1990s ===
The student population at LHS began to climb in the 1990s, which resulted in yet another expansion in 1997. The $24.5 million project added a three-story classroom addition and a fieldhouse, essentially doubling the building’s square footage to 300,000. A unique parking facility was also built as part of the expansion to help ease severe parking problems for students and staff.

Also in the late 1990s, filming took place at Lemont High School for the movie Save the Last Dance. The school was depicted as the main character's Midwestern high school. Portions of the front of the high school were shown during the beginning of the movie along with the main staircase inside the school. Other areas throughout the town were also shown in the movie.

=== Sports complex ===
Lemont High School’s facilities expanded off campus in 2003 with the completion of the Lemont High School Athletic Complex, located at 131st Street and Bell Road. The 26-acre (110,000 m^{2}) facility serves as home to the school’s baseball, soccer, and softball teams.

=== 2006 expansion ===
The stage of the Performing Arts Center

With student enrollment continuing to grow each year, Lemont High School has undergone further expansion recently. In 2005, the community passed a $29.6 million referendum allowing the school to start an expansion which included a new and improved auditorium, approximately 30 new classrooms, a new wood shop, a turf football field with improved lighting and expanded audience seating, an expanded cafeteria area, additional parking, safety upgrades, and much more. Construction started in early 2006. The new addition of 30 classrooms as well as the football stadium enhancements were completed before the start of the 2007 school year. Construction on the new auditorium (now called the Performing Arts Center) was completed in March 2008. Other areas of the school, mainly parking lots and roads, were completed in the summer months of 2008.

The expansion included features that would benefit every Lemont High School student:

- A new 67,500-square-foot (6,270 m^{2}) classroom addition—which was built next to the school and "connected" with the existing structure in the summer of 2007—added more than 25 classrooms, computer and science labs, and other amenities. The new classroom addition opened at the start of the 2007-08 school year, and provides the school with space to accommodate up to 2,100 students.
- The football stadium—which also serves as home for the track and field programs—underwent an extensive renovation. This included a regrading of the playing surface and the installation of synthetic turf, as well as the addition of seating for more than 2,000 fans, a new pressbox, a new concession stand, and new lights. The stadium debuted in August 2007.
- A stand-alone building—the Woods Technology Learning Center—was constructed to greatly expand the classrooms, work space, and resources for the school's industrial technology department.
- The school's old auditorium was demolished, and in its place, the new Performing Arts Center was built. The Performing Arts Center—home to the drama, music, and forensics departments—opened in March 2008 and includes seating for nearly 850, a fly tower that is utilized for storage, state-of-the-art sound and lighting, and an orchestra pit.

Currently, the 360,000-square-foot (33,000 m^{2}) school covers 30 acres (120,000 m^{2}) of land. It continues to stand where it was originally built in 1925. The 2006 construction project, which lasted nearly two years, was named the K-12 Education "Project of the Year" in Midwest Construction magazine's "Best of 2008" competition

== Academics ==
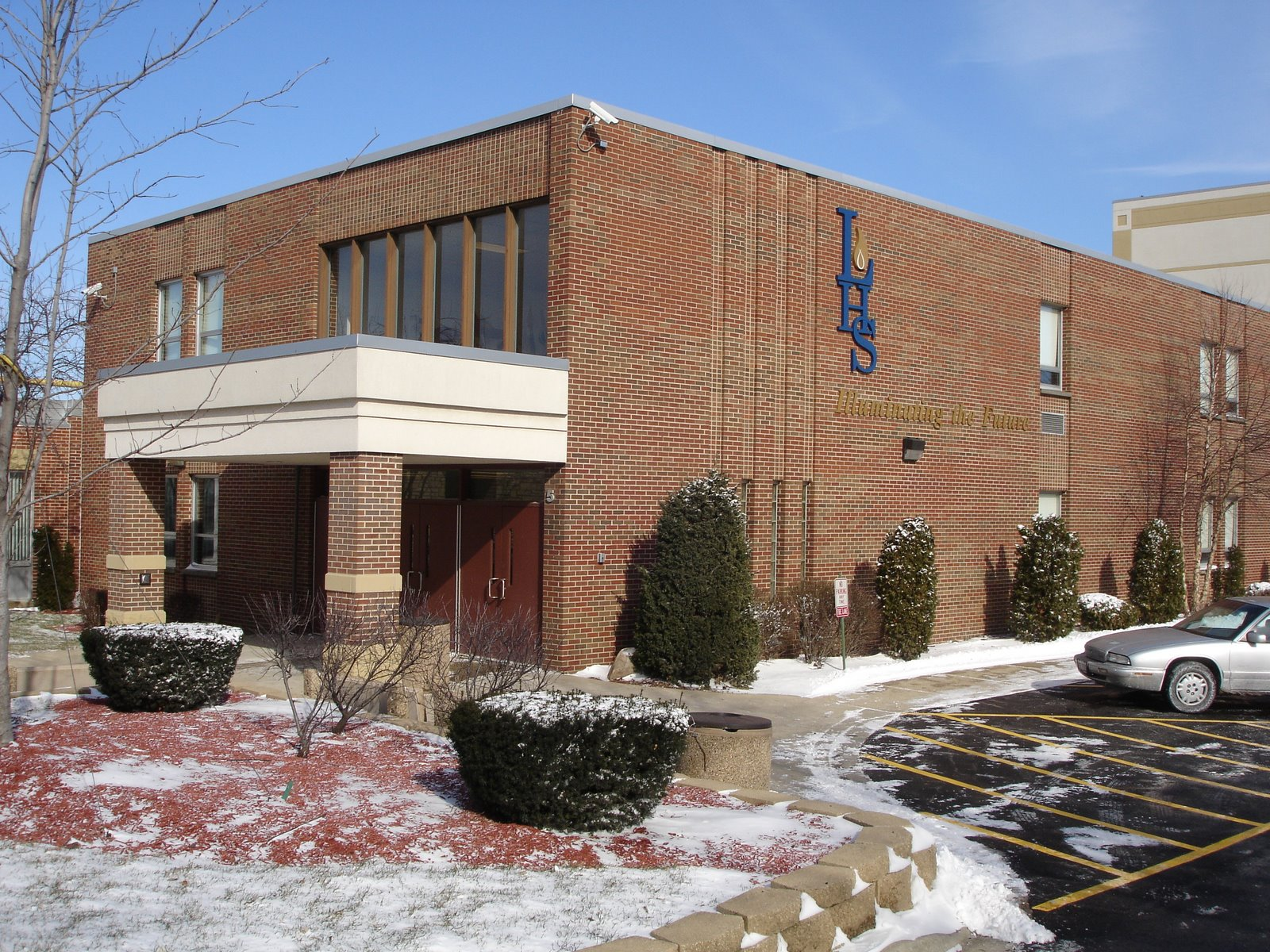
The back of Lemont High School, near the Performing Arts Center, gymnasium, and field house

Lemont High School follows the Block 8 system in which students take eight courses that meet every other day. A standard school day is composed of four 87-minute periods with an optional "zero-hour" available for students to take additional courses before the school day begins.

Lemont High School's enrollment of nearly 1,400 students can choose from approximately 200 course offerings in nine departments. Students are assigned to course levels based on test scores, past achievement, and teacher recommendation. Honors and/or Advanced Placement courses are available in most curricular areas. Students also have access to classes at the Wilco Area Career Center in Romeoville, Illinois, a regional vocational center of which Lemont High School is a member.

Lemont High School recently added Lemont Time. The addition has been added on their PLC days where students get a dedicated 30 minutes every Wednesday to talk about a variety of Lemont topics. Instead of leaving at their usual 2:37pm, student now leave school at 3pm. Though majorly disliked heavily by the student body, Lemont time is there to stay.

The school's class of 2016 earned an average composite ACT test score of 23.3. In addition, 93.9% of the graduating class of 2016 enrolled in post-high school continuing education.

In 2017, Lemont High School was named a National Blue Ribbon School, having been selected as an Exemplary High Performing School. To earn such designation, Lemont High School placed among the top 15 percent of all schools in Illinois when ranked by student performance on the most recently administered English language arts and math state assessments, or by student performance on state assessments in combination with other student performance measures, such as attendance and/or graduation rates.

=== Departments ===
The Academic Departments at Lemont High School are:

- Career & Technical Education
- English
- Fine Arts
- Foreign Language
- Mathematics
- Physical Education, Health & Driver Education
- Science
- Social Studies
- Special Education

== Athletics ==
The LHS Indians logo

The Director of Activities & Athletics is John Young.

Lemont competes in the South Suburban Conference (SSC) and is a member of the Illinois High School Association (IHSA), which governs most sports and competitive activities in the state. Teams are named the Indians (see Naming controversy). School colors are Navy Blue and Gold.

The school sponsors interscholastic teams for young men and women in bowling, basketball, cross country, golf, soccer, tennis, track & field, and volleyball. Young men may compete in baseball, football, and wrestling, while young women may compete in cheerleading, softball. and poms.

The school's teams have finished in the top four of the following IHSA sponsored state championship tournaments or meets:

- Baseball: State Champions (2013–14, 2015-16)
- Basketball (girls): 3rd place (1979–80)
- Bowling (Girls): 3rd place (2003–04)
- Cheerleading: State Champions (2008–09, 2009–10, 2010–11, 2013–14, 2016–17, 2017–18); 2nd place (2006–07, 2007–08, 2015–16); 3rd place (2005–06, 2011–12); 4th place (2014–15)
- Football: 2nd place (2007–08, 2008–09, 2014–15)
- Golf (Boys): 3rd place (2011-2012); 4th place (2021); 4th place (2022)
- Soccer (Girls): 2nd place (2008–09); 3rd place (2010–11, 2017–18); 4th place (2012-2013, 2016–17)
- Softball: 1st place (2022), (2023) 2nd place (1987–88)(2021); 3rd place (1988–89)
- Track & Field (Boys): 2nd place ('99–2000)
- Wrestling: State Champions (2019–20); 3rd place (2009–10); 4th place (2010–11)

Angel Cabral (Class of '10), recorded back-to-back state championships when he earned the 285-pound title at both the 2009 and 2010 Class 2A Individual Wrestling State Championships.

Matt Leibforth (Class of '10), became Lemont's first-ever undefeated state champion when he triumphed in the 135-pound weight class at the 2010 Class 2A Individual Wrestling State Championship. Leibforth finished with a 45-0 record.

A single-season school record three wrestlers won titles at the 2020 IHSA Class 2A Wrestling Individual State Finals: Drew Nash (126 IBS), Apollo Gothard (220 IBS) and Muhamad Jarad (285 IBS). Gothard finished the season 49-0 and set a school season record for victories.

=== Naming controversy ===
Lemont High School's teams had been known as the Indians until the mid-1960s, when an athletic director christened the school with the name Injuns to distinguish it from the many others using Native American names as their team name. However, many viewed the name Injuns as a racial slur. In the early 2000s, the Illinois Native American Bar Association notified the high school of its disapproval of the Injuns name. By August 2004, the District 210 board voted to choose a new mascot with community input.

In February 2005, a school and student vote favored the name "Lime Stone Blocks" as the township is historically known for its lime stone quarry. The other option on the ballot was Engines a near homophone of the outgoing mascot name. The school board decided to go against the popular vote and elect the name "Flames", this led to opponents dressing up as fire fighters and using homophobic slurs calling the sports teams, the lemont "flamers" However, the Flames name was never officially adopted. Local elections later in 2005 brought in new school board members who fulfilled their promise to restore the school's original Indians mascot name. The school went without a nickname for the 2005-2006 school year, allowing time for a transition of logos and uniforms. Lemont officially returned to the Indians name beginning with the 2006-2007 school year. The school board voted unanimously in July 2021 to phase out the Indians mascot.

== Activities and clubs ==
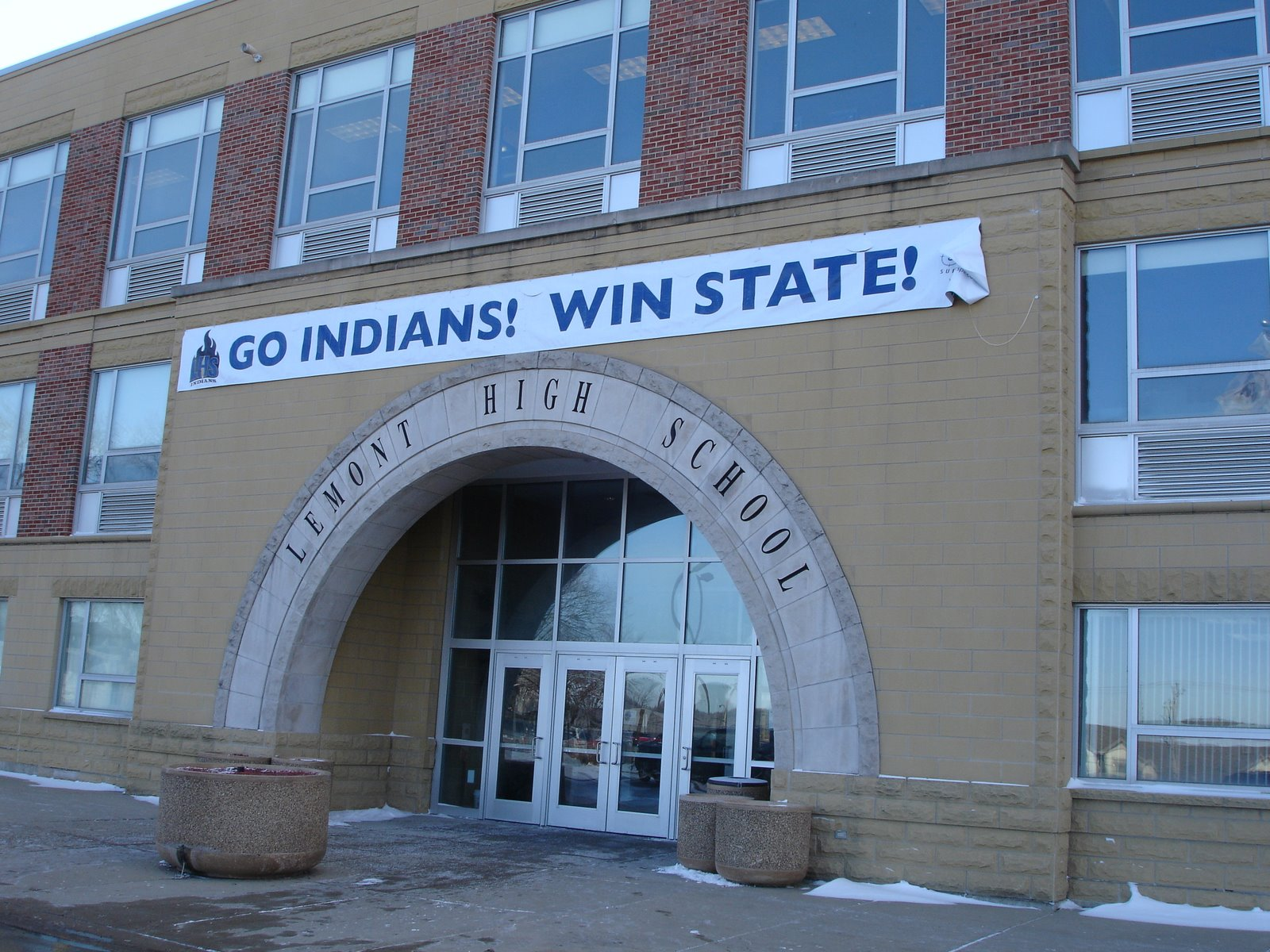
The archway in the front of the school

Extra-curricular opportunities are available to each student. In order to keep the system of verifying eligibility manageable, the Illinois High School Association guidelines for athletics are used as a basis for eligibility for all extra-curricular activities at Lemont High School. Extra-curricular activities at Lemont High School are placed into three classifications: Clubs, Competitive Extra-Curricular Activities, and Co-Curricular Activities.

== Notable alumni ==
- Garrett Acton, MLB pitcher
- Scott Darling, NHL goaltender, 2015 Stanley Cup Champion with the Chicago Blackhawks
- Jeff Duncan, MLB outfielder
- Clayton Fejedelem, NFL player
- Steve Grand, country music singer
- Tyler Jay, pitcher, first-round pick of 2015 MLB draft
- Jake Latz, MLB pitcher (Texas Rangers)
- David Molk, NFL player
- Michael Papierski, MLB player
- Ethan Pocic, NFL player (Cleveland Browns)
- Christian Vande Velde, Tour de France cyclist
- Louis Virtel, comedian, writer and podcaster
