= Owen Freeman =

American basketball player (born 2004)

No. 8 – Auburn Tigers
- Position: Power forward
- Conference: Southeastern Conference

Personal information
- Born: November 15, 2004 (age 22)
- Listed height: 6 ft 10 in (2.08 m)
- Listed weight: 245 lb (111 kg)

Career information
- High school: Moline (Moline, Illinois)
- College: Iowa (2023–2025); Creighton (2025–2026); Auburn (2026–present)

Career highlights
- Big Ten Freshman of the Year (2024); Big Ten All-Freshman Team (2024)

Owen Freeman (born November 15, 2004) is an American college basketball player for the Auburn Tigers of the Southeastern Conference (SEC). He previously played for the Iowa Hawkeyes and Creighton Bluejays.

== Early life and high school ==
Freeman attended Bradley-Bourbonnais Community High School before transferring to Moline High School for his senior season. As a senior, at Moline High School he helped lead his school to a state title. Coming out of high school, Freeman committed to play college basketball for the Iowa Hawkeyes over offers from other schools such as Notre Dame, Wisconsin, Michigan State, Indiana, Marquette, Northwestern, Ohio State, Purdue, Butler, Wake Forest, Illinois, and Western Illinois.

== College career ==
Freeman earned a starting spot in the Hawkeyes lineup ten games into his freshman season. On February 11, 2024, he recorded 17 points and a career-high 14 rebounds while also having career highs in assists with four and blocking four shots in a win over Minnesota. On March 10, Freeman blocked five shots in a loss to Illinois. For his performance on the 2023–24 season, he was named the Big Ten freshman of the year by the media and the co-Big Ten freshman of the year by the coaches. Throughout the 2023–24 season, Freeman was named the Big Ten freshman of the week nine times. He finished his freshman season in 2023–24 playing in 34 games with 25 starts where he averaged 10.6 points per game, 6.6 rebounds per game, 1.2 assists per game, 0.9 steals per game, and 1.8 blocks per game. As a sophomore, Freeman averaged 16.7 points, 6.7 rebounds, and 1.8 blocks per game. Following the season he transferred to Creighton. He was limited by a knee injury during his junior year and transferred to Auburn after the season.

== Career statistics ==
Legend
GP	Games played	GS	Games started	MPG	Minutes per game
FG%	Field goal percentage	3P%	3-point field goal percentage	FT%	Free throw percentage
RPG	Rebounds per game	APG	Assists per game	SPG	Steals per game
BPG	Blocks per game	PPG	Points per game	**Bold**	Career high

=== College ===
Year	Team	GP	GS	MPG	FG%	3P%	FT%	RPG	APG	SPG	BPG	PPG
2023–24	Iowa	34	25	22.9	.614	.000	.661	6.6	1.2	.9	1.8	10.6
2024–25	Iowa	19	19	26.4	.638	.313	.600	6.7	1.3	.6	1.8	16.7
2025–26	Creighton	14	8	15.0	.696	–	.556	4.9	1.1	.7	1.1	7.6
**Career**		**67**	**52**	**22.2**	**.635**	**.250**	**.629**	**6.3**	**1.2**	**.8**	**1.7**	**11.7**
