= Clayton Fejedelem =

American football player (born 1993)

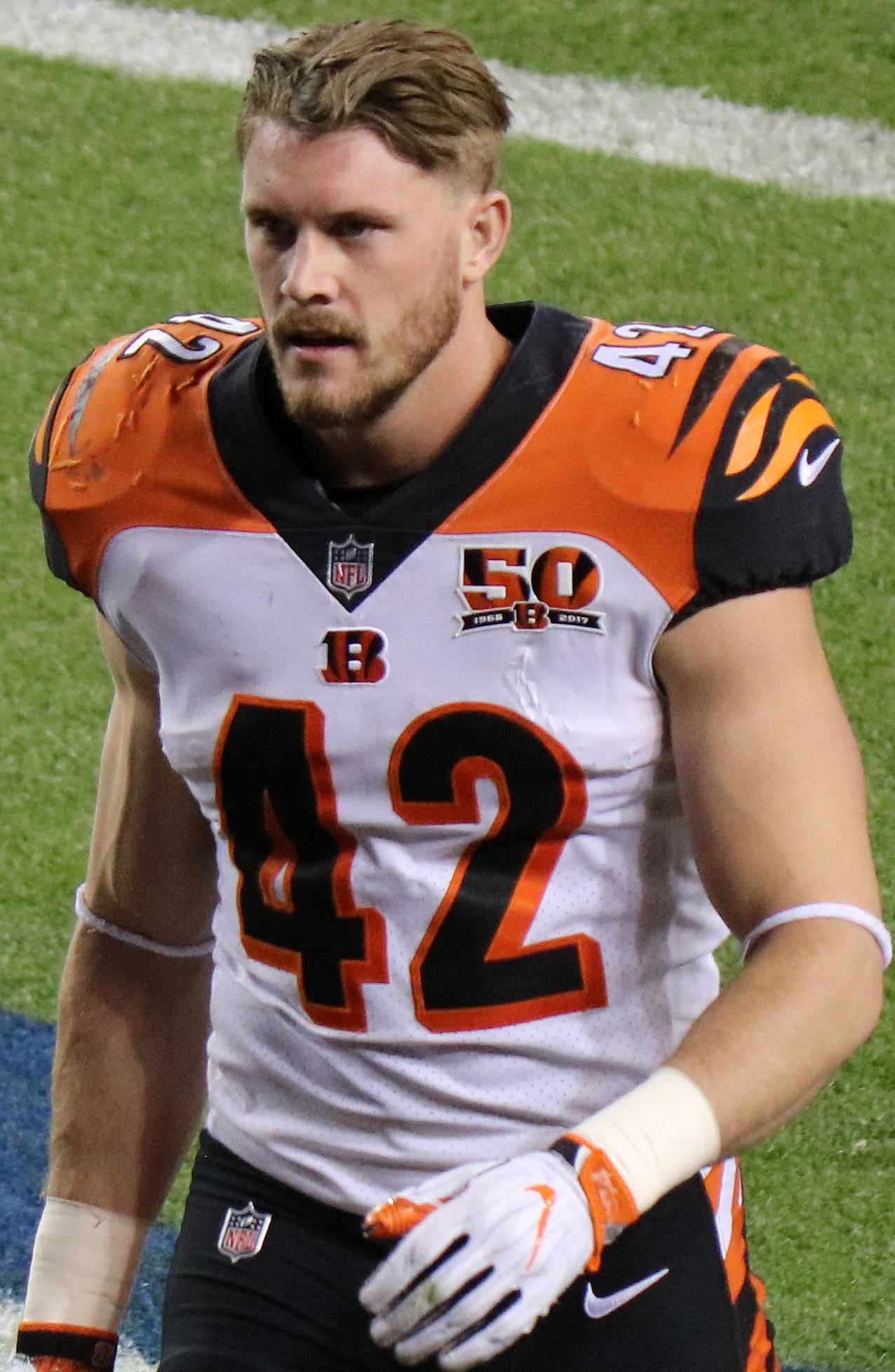
- Fejedelem with the Cincinnati Bengals in 2017

No. 42
- Position: Safety

Personal information
- Born: June 2, 1993 (age 33); Lemont, Illinois, U.S.
- Listed height: 6 ft 1 in (1.85 m)
- Listed weight: 205 lb (93 kg)

Career information
- High school: Lemont
- College: Saint Xavier (2011–2012); Illinois (2013–2015)
- NFL draft: 2016: 7th round, 245th overall pick

Career history
- Cincinnati Bengals (2016–2019); Miami Dolphins (2020–2022)

Awards and highlights
- NAIA national champion (2011); Second-team All-Big Ten (2015); Second-team All-MSFA (2012)

Career NFL statistics
- Total tackles: 146
- Forced fumbles: 2
- Fumble recoveries: 3
- Pass deflections: 3
- Interceptions: 1
- Defensive touchdowns: 1
- Stats at Pro Football Reference

Clayton Fejedelem (/ˈfɛdʒələm/ FEDGE-ə-ləm; born June 2, 1993) is an American former professional football player who was a safety and special teamer in the National Football League (NFL). He played college football for the Saint Xavier Cougars and Illinois Fighting Illini, and was selected by the Cincinnati Bengals in the seventh round of the 2016 NFL draft.

== Early life ==
A native of Illinois, Clayton Fejedelem attended Lemont High School in Lemont, Illinois, where he lettered in football, wrestling, and lacrosse. Fejedelem was a two-time All-Conference selection in football for the Lemont Indians, and earned All-State honors in football as a senior in 2010. That same year, he also earned South Suburban Blue Player of the Year honors. He was inducted into the Lemont High School Athletic Hall of Fame in 2024.

== College career ==
=== Saint Xavier University ===
Fejedelem played two seasons at NAIA Saint Xavier University from 2011 to 2012. In 2011, he recorded 68 tackles, 5.0 tackles-for-loss, five interceptions, a team-high nine pass breakups, three forced fumbles, four fumble recoveries and one pick-six touchdown. Clayton was named St. Xavier Newcomer of the Year in 2011, after helping the Cougars win the NAIA national championship and finish with a 14–1 record. He led SXU to an 11–2 record in 2012, racking up 87 tackles, 10.5 tackles-for-loss, 1.0 sack, 3 interceptions, 8 pass breakups and two fumble recoveries to earn second-team All-Mid-States Football Association honors.

=== University of Illinois, Urbana-Champaign ===
Fejedelem redshirted his junior season at the University of Illinois Urbana-Champaign in 2013 after joining the team as a walk-on during spring practices, but had to sit out due to NCAA transfer rules. In 2014, he recorded his first tackle as an Illini against Western Kentucky and went on to tally 51 tackles, a tackle for loss, two pass breakups and a fumble recovery on the season. He played in all 13 games, including one start at Northwestern University where he recorded a career-high of 12 tackles and one pass breakup. In 2015, Clayton started all 12 games at free safety, going on to record a team-best 140 tackles (fifth in the nation at 11.7 tackles per game), 4.5 tackles-for-loss, second pass breakups, two interceptions, and one forced fumble. He was the Illini team captain and Defensive Player of the Year, earning him an All-Big Ten Conference honorable mention selection by the coaches and All-Big Ten second-team selection by the media.

== Professional career ==
Pre-draft measurables
| Height | Weight | Arm length | Hand span | 40-yard dash | 10-yard split | 20-yard split | 20-yard shuttle | Three-cone drill | Vertical jump | Broad jump | Bench press |
|---|---|---|---|---|---|---|---|---|---|---|---|
| 5 ft 11 7/8 in (1.83 m) | 204 lb (93 kg) | 30 3/4 in (0.78 m) | 9 5/8 in (0.24 m) | 4.54 s | 1.57 s | 2.62 s | 4.30 s | 7.17 s | 40.5 in (1.03 m) | 10 ft 1 in (3.07 m) | 20 reps |
All values from Illinois Pro Day

=== Cincinnati Bengals ===
Fejedelem was selected by the Cincinnati Bengals in the seventh round, 245th overall, in the 2016 NFL draft. In his rookie season, he appeared in all 16 games and recorded three total tackles. In the 2017 season, he appeared in all 16 games as a team captain and started five. He recorded one interception, two passes defensed, and 56 total tackles. In the 2018 season, he was named a team captain, played in all 16 games and started one.. During the season opener against the Indianapolis Colts, he recorded a game-clinching 83-yard fumble return for a touchdown on a drive where the Colts were threatening to score and go ahead late. In 2019, he was named a team captain and played in all 16 games.

=== Miami Dolphins ===
On March 20, 2020, Fejedelem signed a three-year contract with the Miami Dolphins. In the 2020 season, he was named special teams captain and appeared in 13 games after missing the first three due to injury. He recorded one forced fumble and 10 tackles total. Against the Las Vegas Raiders, he rushed for 22 yards on a fake punt to convert a 4th-and-1 to extend a drive that ended in a Miami touchdown.

On September 1, 2022, Fejedelem was placed on injured reserve. He was activated on October 8.

== Personal life ==
The son of Steven and Colleen Fejedelem, Clayton has two brothers, Ryan (older) and Jeremy (younger). They were born and raised in Lemont, Illinois, a southwestern suburb of Chicago. Fejedelem attended Saint Xavier University as a business major in 2011, but transferred to the University of Illinois Urbana-Champaign in 2013 where he walked on and graduated with a bachelor's degree in communications in 2015. He married Gabriele Fejedelem in Chicago, Illinois in March 2020. The couple welcomed their son in December 2020, and a daughter in July 2022.
