= Tom Prince (baseball) =

American baseball player & coach (born 1964)

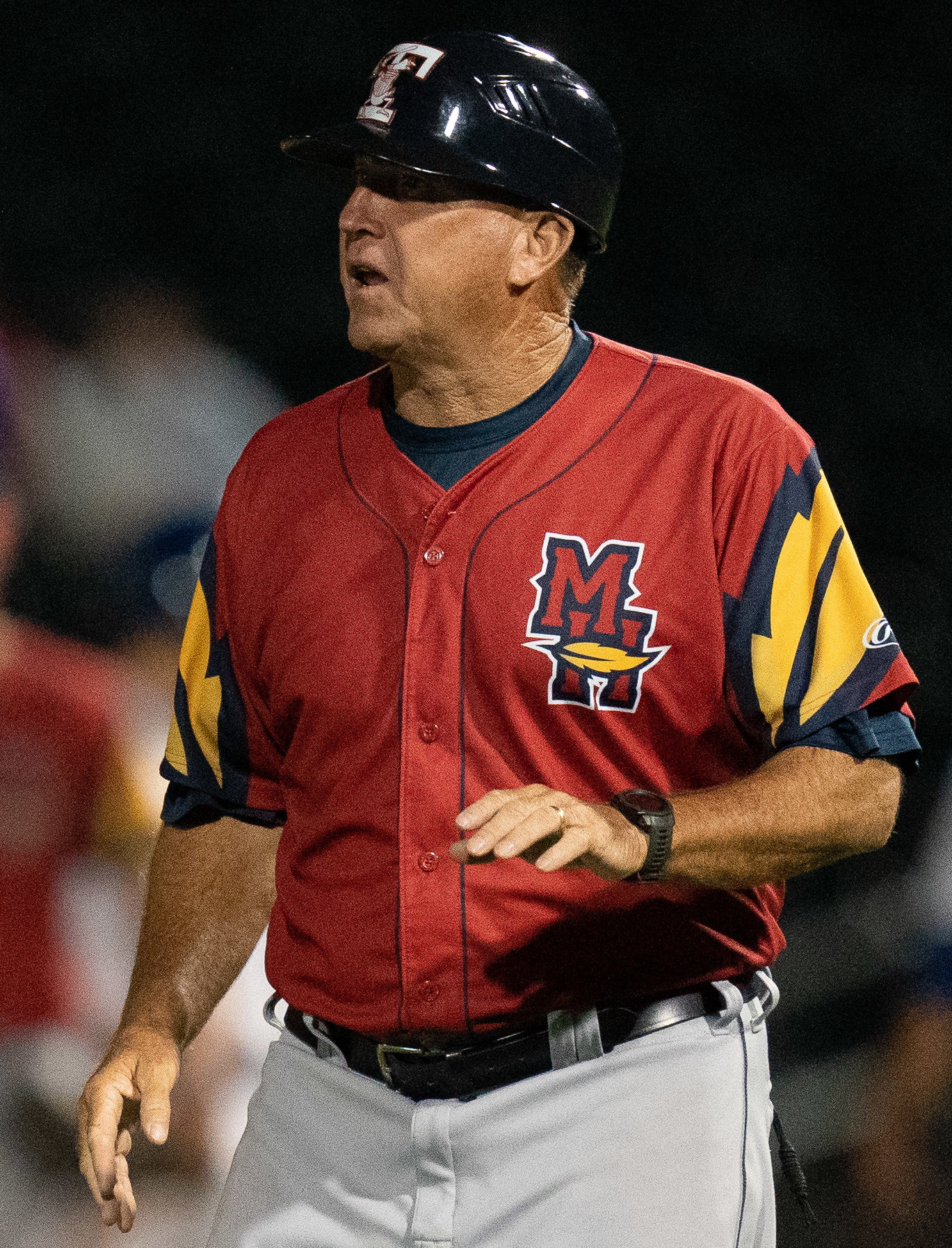
- Prince with the Toledo Mud Hens in 2021
- Catcher
- Born: August 13, 1964 (age 61); Kankakee, Illinois, U.S.
- Batted: Right Threw: Right

MLB debut
- September 22, 1987, for the Pittsburgh Pirates

Last MLB appearance
- September 28, 2003, for the Kansas City Royals

MLB statistics
- Batting average: .208
- Home runs: 24
- Runs batted in: 140
- Stats at Baseball Reference

Teams
- Pittsburgh Pirates (1987–1993); Los Angeles Dodgers (1994–1998); Philadelphia Phillies (1999–2000); Minnesota Twins (2001–2003); Kansas City Royals (2003)

Thomas Albert Prince (born August 13, 1964) is an American former professional baseball player, and coach. He played in Major League Baseball as a catcher from 1987 to 2003. Although Prince didn't produce impressive offensive statistics, he excelled defensively as a catcher which enabled him to sustain a seventeen-year playing career with several major league teams.

After his playing career, he served as a coach and manager in the Pittsburgh Pirates and the Detroit Tigers minor league organizations.

== Baseball career ==
Primarily a catcher during his playing career, Prince batted and threw with his right hand. He was listed as 5 ft 11 in (1.80 m) tall and 185 lbs. After a successful career at Bradley-Bourbonnais Community High School, Prince was drafted twice by the Atlanta Braves; with the 195th pick of the 1983 January draft, as part of that draft's 8th round, and with the 76th overall pick of that same year's June draft, as part of that draft's 4th round. He elected not to sign both times, instead attending Kankakee Community College. There, he attracted the attention of the Pittsburgh Pirates, who selected him with the 64th overall pick of the 1984 January draft. This time, he signed the deal, and that summer began play with the Pirates' farm club in the Gulf Coast League.

Prince enjoyed a strong defensive reputation as a prospect, but his offensive production fluctuated wildly as he advanced through the system. With the Macon Pirates of the South Atlantic League, he put up an unusually low .208 batting average, but hit for moderate power and drew 96 base on balls in only 360 at bats. Two years later at AA, he put up a .307 batting average with the Harrisburg Senators of the Eastern League.

After a promotion to the AAA Buffalo Bisons of the American Association the next year, his batting average dropped back down to .260 and his walk rate collapsed, but he started hitting for substantially more power, putting up a .451 slugging percentage. He was generally well regarded as a prospect, but talent evaluators weren't sure exactly which skills he would display after promotion to the majors.

Prince ultimately settled in as a backup catcher, relying on solid defense to compensate for a weak bat. He would never total even 200 at-bats in a single major league season, but he spent parts of seventeen years in the big leagues with the Pirates, Los Angeles Dodgers, Philadelphia Phillies, Minnesota Twins, and Kansas City Royals. During that time, he caught for some of the best pitchers in baseball, including Cy Young winners Doug Drabek and Johan Santana, and six-time All-Star Curt Schilling.

== Career statistics ==
In a seventeen-year major league career, Prince played in 519 games, accumulating 248 hits in 1,190 at bats for a .208 career batting average along with 24 home runs, 140 runs batted in and an on-base percentage of .286. He ended his career with a .992 fielding percentage.

== Post-playing career ==
After retiring as a player, Prince retained his connection with professional baseball. On July 18, 2004, he was inducted into the Buffalo Baseball Hall of Fame. In 2005, he became the manager of the Williamsport Crosscutters in the New York–Penn League and in his first year, led them to the playoffs. After one more year in Williamsport, Prince became the manager of the Pirates' Gulf Coast League team in Bradenton, Florida in 2007. In 2014, he took the helm as the fourth manager of the Pirates' Advanced-A Bradenton Marauders in Bradenton, Florida. In January 2015, Prince was named as the manager for the Pirates' Double-A affiliate, the Altoona Curve. He spent 2016 as the Pirates' minor league field coordinator and on October 29, 2016, he was named bench coach for the major league team for the 2017 season.

== Toledo Mud Hens ==
On December 3, 2019, Prince was named the manager of the Toledo Mud Hens, the Detroit Tigers' Triple-A affiliate. After leading the Mud Hens to a first place in the division in 2021, Prince was released by the Tigers organization on October 6, 2021.

Sporting positions
Preceded by Pete Mackanin	Gulf Coast League Pirates Manager; 2007–2012	Succeeded by Milver Reyes
