= Steve Gaunty =

American football player (born 1957)

No. 83
- Position: Wide receiver

Personal information
- Born: May 3, 1957 (age 69); Chicago, Illinois, U.S.
- Listed height: 5 ft 10 in (1.78 m)
- Listed weight: 175 lb (79 kg)

Career information
- High school: Thornton Township (Harvey, Illinois)
- College: Colorado; Northern Colorado
- NFL draft: 1979: undrafted

Career history
- Kansas City Chiefs (1979); Minnesota Vikings (1980)*; Montreal Alouettes (1981)*
- * Offseason or practice squad member only

Career NFL statistics
- Receptions: 5
- Receiving yards: 87
- Receiving touchdowns: 1
- Stats at Pro Football Reference

Steven A. Gaunty (born May 3, 1957) is an American former professional football player who was a wide receiver for one season with the Kansas City Chiefs of the National Football League (NFL). He played college football for the Colorado Buffaloes and Northern Colorado Bears.

== Early life and college ==
Steven A. Gaunty was born on May 3, 1957, in Chicago, Illinois. He attended Thornton Township High School in Harvey, Illinois. He graduated from Thornwood High School in South Holland, Illinois where he was an All American.

Gaunty played college football for the Colorado Buffaloes of the University of Colorado Boulder from 1975 to 1977. He caught seven passes for 112 yards in 1975, 13 passes for 233 yards and one touchdown in 1976, and 13 passes for 370 yards and two touchdowns in 1977. He then transferred to play for the Northern Colorado Bears of Northern Colorado University in 1978.

== Professional career ==
After going undrafted in the 1979 NFL draft, Gaunty signed with the Kansas City Chiefs on May 16, 1979. He played in nine games for the Chiefs during the 1979 season, catching five passes for 87 yards and one touchdown while also returning 12 kicks for 271 yards. He was placed on injured reserve on November 21, 1979. Gaunty was waived in June 1980.

Gaunty was claimed off waivers by the Minnesota Vikings in June 1980. He was released on September 2, 1980.

Gaunty signed with the Montreal Alouettes of the Canadian Football League in 1981, but was later released.
