= Keagen Trost =

American football player (born 2001)

No. 79 – Los Angeles Rams
- Position: Offensive tackle
- Roster status: Active

Personal information
- Born: April 15, 2001 (age 25); Kankakee, Illinois, U.S.
- Listed height: 6 ft 5 in (1.96 m)
- Listed weight: 315 lb (143 kg)

Career information
- High school: Kankakee (Kankakee, Illinois)
- College: Morgan State (2019); Indiana State (2020–2023); Wake Forest (2024); Missouri (2025)
- NFL draft: 2026: 3rd round, 93rd overall pick

Career history
- Los Angeles Rams (2026–present)

Awards and highlights
- First-team All-American (2025); First-team All-SEC (2025)
- Stats at Pro Football Reference

Keagen Trost (born April 15, 2001) is an American professional football offensive tackle for the Los Angeles Rams of the National Football League (NFL). He played college football for the Morgan State Bears, Indiana State Sycamores, Wake Forest Demon Deacons and Missouri Tigers. Trost was selected by the Rams in the third round of the 2026 NFL draft.

== Early life ==
Trost was born on April 15, 2001, and grew up in Chicago, raised by his mother. He started playing football at a young age and was the starting left tackle at Kankakee High School, where he was an all-conference selection as both a junior and senior. Trost served as team captain in his senior year. He was an unranked recruit coming out of high school and only had offers from a few NCAA Division I FCS schools. He initially committed to play college football for the Eastern Illinois Panthers, but after their coach left, de-committed. Trost ultimately signed to play for the Morgan State Bears.

== College career ==
Trost started two games for Morgan State as a true freshman in 2019. He appeared in a total of four games and redshirted, but did not stay with the team the entire season, leaving so he could move closer to home. Trost transferred to the Indiana State Sycamores in 2020, but did not play that year as the season was canceled due to the COVID-19 pandemic. He then only appeared in two games, one as a starter, in 2021, due to injuries. Trost started 11 games during the 2022 season and eight games in 2023.

Trost transferred to the Wake Forest Demon Deacons in 2024, appeared in all 12 games, and then transferred to the Missouri Tigers for his seventh and final season of eligibility in 2025. With the Tigers, Trost started 13 games and was named first-team All-Southeastern Conference (SEC) and first-team All-American by Pro Football Focus (PFF). He was PFF's highest-graded offensive tackle nationally. At the conclusion of his collegiate career, he was invited to the East–West Shrine Bowl and the NFL Scouting Combine.

== Professional career ==
Pre-draft measurables
Height	Weight	Arm length	Hand span	Wingspan	Vertical jump	Bench press
6 ft 4 5/8 in (1.95 m)	311 lb (141 kg)	32 3/8 in (0.82 m)	9 1/4 in (0.23 m)	6 ft 8 7/8 in (2.05 m)	31.0 in (0.79 m)	26 reps
All values from NFL Combine/Pro Day

Trost was selected by the Los Angeles Rams in the third round with the 93rd overall pick in the 2026 NFL draft. He was placed on injured reserve on August 30, 2026. He was activated on October 17.
