= Saul White Jr. =

American basketball player (born 1985)

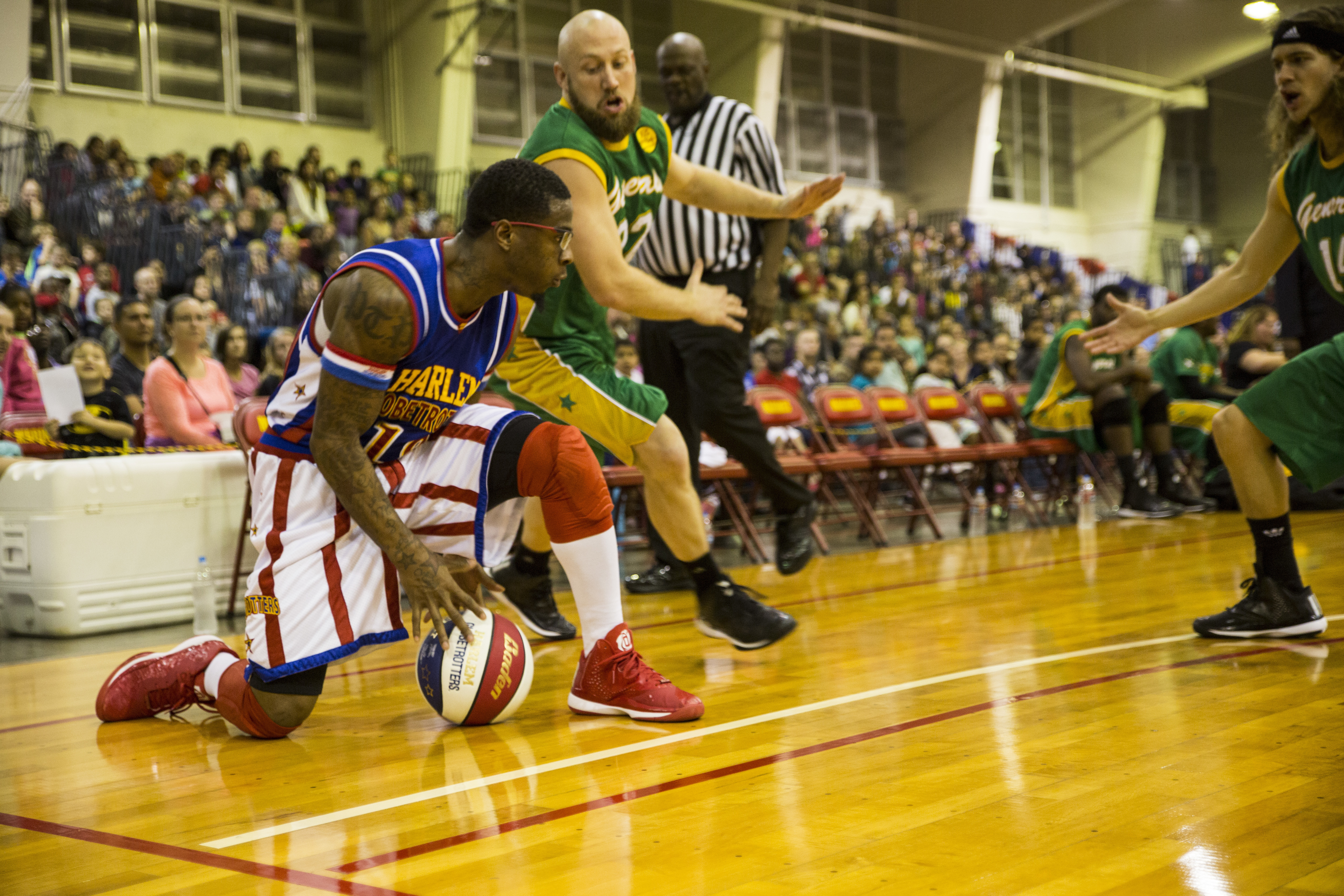
"Flip White" dribbling around his opponents

Saul White Jr., (born December 9, 1985) nicknamed Flip White or Flip, is a basketball entertainer and a member of the Harlem Globetrotters. He was raised in Summit, Illinois. He received a full scholarship to play basketball at Moraine Valley Community College. After Moraine Valley, White Jr. played in the IBL league for the Ohio Hidden Gems. After playing in the IBL, he signed with the Harlem Globetrotters.
