= Thornton Township High School =

Public high school in Illinois, United States

Location
- 15001 S. Broadway; South Suburbs; Harvey, Cook County, Illinois 60426; United States; 41.6181°N 87.6434°W

Information
- Other name: Thornton
- School type: Public Secondary
- Opened: 1899
- School district: Thornton Twp. HS 205
- Superintendent: Dr. Nathaniel Cunningham Jr.
- Dean: Dontrell Jackson; Isolta Jimenez-Proudfoot; Jill Lupescu; Carolyn Strong
- Principal: Tony Ratliff
- Assistant Principal: Wanda Russell
- Teaching staff: 119.00 (on an FTE basis)
- Grades: 9–12
- Gender: Coed
- Enrollment: 1,697 (2024–2025)
  - Grade 9: 449 students
  - Grade 10: 392 students
  - Grade 11: 460 students
  - Grade 12: 542 students
- Average class size: 19
- Student to teacher ratio: 14.26
- Campus: Suburban
- Colors: Purple; White
- Athletics conference: Southland Athletic Conference
- Mascot: Wildcat
- Team name: Wildcats
- Rival: Bloom Trail; Kankakee
- Accreditation: Illinois State Board of Education
- Newspaper: Paw Prints
- Communities served: Harvey, South Holland, Phoenix, Riverdale, Dixmoor, Markham, Blue Island
- Website: School website

Thornton Township High School, often simply referred to as Thornton is a public high school founded in 1899, located in Harvey, one of the South Suburbs of the city of Chicago, Illinois, USA. The school is one of three administered by Thornton Township High Schools District 205. It is occasionally confused with the two other similarly named schools in the district, Thornridge High School and Thornwood High School.

A predominantly African American and Hispanic high school, Thornton is best known for its alumni who have been successful in both the Performing Arts and athletics.

== History ==
The site for Thornton Township High School was decided by a special election on May 28, 1898, where Harvey was selected over Dolton by a 1,504 to 1,123 vote, with the estimate of the school's cost being $40,000. Oscar L. Murray was the architect of the building whose cost by October 1898 was $35,000, and was planned that included physical and biological laboratories, a library, gymnasium, a 280-seat assembly room, and bicycle/lunch rooms.

By May 1899, the plans had been firmed up to include a two-story structure with basement, with an interior to be finished in red oak. Heat would be provided by steam, with electric fans and an automated clock and signal system. The main floor assembly room was expanded to seat 700. Construction was set to begin in June, with completion in October. The original building was located at 154th Street and Columbia Avenue.

In 1913, Thornton was one of nine schools, and the only south suburban school, invited to found what became the Suburban League, which mostly consisted of schools like Thornton which had formerly been members of the Cook County High School League. Thornton Junior College, now spun off and renamed South Suburban College, was organized in 1927.

In 1928, 16-year-old Betty Robinson (between her Junior and Senior years at Thornton) not only won the very first Olympic gold medal awarded to a woman in the 100 meters (at the 1928 Summer Olympics in Amsterdam), but set a world record which stood until 1932.

During World War II, like many high schools, Thornton made changes to accommodate the war effort. Evening classes for adults started in 1942 to begin training people for necessary war jobs. By 1943, the school was open for 87 hours each week, and had been converted almost exclusively to wartime training.

Additions were made to the building in 1912 (costing $140,000), 1927 ($345,000) and 1937 ($300,000). A third floor was added in 1948. In 1949, a new physical education facility was added, including a natatorium, wrestling rooms, locker facilities and classrooms for health classes, in addition to two gymnasia, one of which could seat 3,500 for basketball games. The new gymnasium was dedicated in April 1950.

== Athletics ==
Thornton's sports teams, which are referred to as the Wildcats, compete in the Southland Athletic Conference. The teams also compete in state championship series sponsored by the Illinois High School Association (IHSA). The school colors are purple and white. Teams are stylized as the "Wildcats".

The school sponsors interscholastic athletic teams for boys and girls in basketball, soccer, track and field and cross country. Boys may also compete in baseball, American football, swimming and diving and wrestling. Girls may compete in cheerleading, softball and volleyball.

The following athletic teams have won or placed top four in their respective IHSA sponsored state tournament:

- Basketball (Boys) – State Champions (1933, 1966); 2nd Place (1934, 1935, 1961, 1995, 1996); 3rd Place (1983, 1997, 2009); 4th Place (1965)
- Football – State Champions (1991)
- Wrestling – State Champions (1954, 1955, 1959)

== Activities ==
Thornton is known for its illustrious Speech team. The following groups advanced to the IHSA State Finals competition, sponsored by the IHSA, and were crowned champions.

- Debate: State Champions (1975)
- Drama: State Champions (1985, 1989, 1991, 1994, 1997, 2019)
- Group Interpretation: State Champions (1981, 1983, 1997)
- Individual Events: State Champions (1988, 1993)

== Notable alumni ==
- Jim Ard (class of 1966) was an NBA player and member of the 1976 NBA Champion Boston Celtics, sixth overall pick of 1970 NBA draft.
- Milo Backus, geophysicist
- Lloyd Batts (class of 1970) was a basketball player for the University of Cincinnati who played one season with the ABA Virginia Squires.
- Ed Beinor was an NFL tackle
- Michael Boatman is an actor and writer, known for roles in the television series The Good Fight, The Good Wife, Instant Mom, Spin City, Arliss, China Beach and Hamburger Hill.
- Lou Boudreau (class of 1935) was a Major League Baseball shortstop and manager, elected to the Baseball Hall Of Fame in 1970. A copy of his Hall of Fame plaque hangs in Thornton's "Boudreau Room". He also led Thornton's basketball team to three state championships in the 1930s.
- Joevan Catron (class of 2006), basketball player
- Steve Coutchie quarterbacked the undefeated national champion 1923 Illinois Fighting Illini football team.'
- Stanley DeSantis (class of 1971) actor and businessman.
- The Dells is a primarily R & B musical group formed in 1952 that was inducted in the Rock and Roll Hall of Fame in 2004 and known for the song "Oh, What a Night".
- Suzzanne Douglas (class of 1974)– actress
- Tom Dreesen (class of 1957) is a comedian, entertainer and public speaker, best remembered for his appearances on The Tonight Show Starring Johnny Carson and Late Show With David Letterman, and as an opening act for Frank Sinatra.
- Melvin Ely (class of 1997) was a professional basketball player who played for the NBA's New Orleans Pelicans.
- Mustapha Farrakhan Jr. (class of 2007) is a professional basketball player who played for the University of Virginia and is a member of Nation of Islam.
- Lupe Fiasco (Wasalu Muhammad Jaco) (class of 2000) is a Grammy Award-winning rapper.
- Terry Fox (class of 1953) was an MLB pitcher (1960-66) for the Milwaukee Braves and Detroit Tigers.
- Barry Gardner was an NFL linebacker (1999–2005), and member of the Philadelphia Eagles team that appeared in Super Bowl XXXIX.
- Winfield Garnett was an NFL defensive tackle
- Steve Gaunty was an NFL wide receiver
- Jack Golden is an NFL linebacker who was a member of two teams which appeared in the Super Bowl; the 2000 New York Giants and 2002 Tampa Bay Buccaneers.
- Napoleon Harris (class of 1997) was an NFL linebacker (2002–2009) for the Minnesota Vikings and later a member of the Illinois Senate.
- LaRoyce Hawkins (class of 2006), spoken word artist, stand-up comic and actor, starring on NBC's Chicago P.D..
- Bill Hayes (class of 1942) is an actor and singer, best remembered for his role in the soap opera Days of Our Lives.
- Rod Higgins (class of 1978) played in the NBA for 13 years before becoming an executive with the Charlotte Bobcats.
- Terrance Jamison (class of 2005) is a co-defensive coordinator and defensive line coach for the Illinois Fighting Illini.
- Tim Jamison (class of 2004) was an NFL defensive end for the Houston Texans
- Morez Johnson Jr. (class of 2024) is a college basketball player.
- Richard Johnson was an NFL defensive back for the Houston Oilers
- Marvin Jones (class of 2012) is a basketball player in the Greek Basketball League
- Norman J. Kansfield, president of New Brunswick Theological Seminary, 1993–2005.
- Lamar McGriggs (class of 1986) played linebacker for the New York Giants and in the Canadian Football League.
- Antwaan Randle El (class of 1997) was an NFL wide receiver for the Pittsburgh Steelers and Washington Redskins who played for the Steelers' championship team in Super Bowl XL; currently a television sports commentator
- Don Robertson is a former MLB outfielder (Chicago Cubs)
- Betty Robinson (class of 1929) is a two–time Olympic gold medalist; she won the first gold medal in the women's 100 meter dash at the 1928 Summer Olympics. She held the world record in the 100 meters for 4 years. Her Olympic gold medal is housed at the school.
- Dandrell Scott is a rapper and voiceover actor for Wendy's.
- Shelby Steele is an author, columnist and filmmaker.
- Dick Steere was a guard in the National Football League.
- Morris Stewart music producer, songwriter
- Tai Streets is a former NFL wide receiver (1999–2004) who played for the University of Michigan's 1997 national championship team.
- John Sullivan played shortstop for the Washington Senators and St. Louis Browns in six Major League Baseball seasons during the 1940s.
- Willie Taylor- singer
- Danitra Vance was an Obie Award–winning actress, perhaps best known for her time performing on Saturday Night Live, where she was the first African-American woman to be a regular cast member.
- Melvin Van Peebles is a director, producer, actor and writer (Sweet Sweetback's Baadasssss Song).
- Tracy Webster (class of 1990) is a basketball assistant coach at the University of California at Berkeley who was interim head coach for DePaul in 2010.
- Wendy White (class of 1971) former mezzo-soprano with the New York Metropolitan Opera
- Steven Whitehurst is an author, poet, essayist and educator.
- Sammy Williams was an NFL offensive tackle
