= Lockport Township High School =

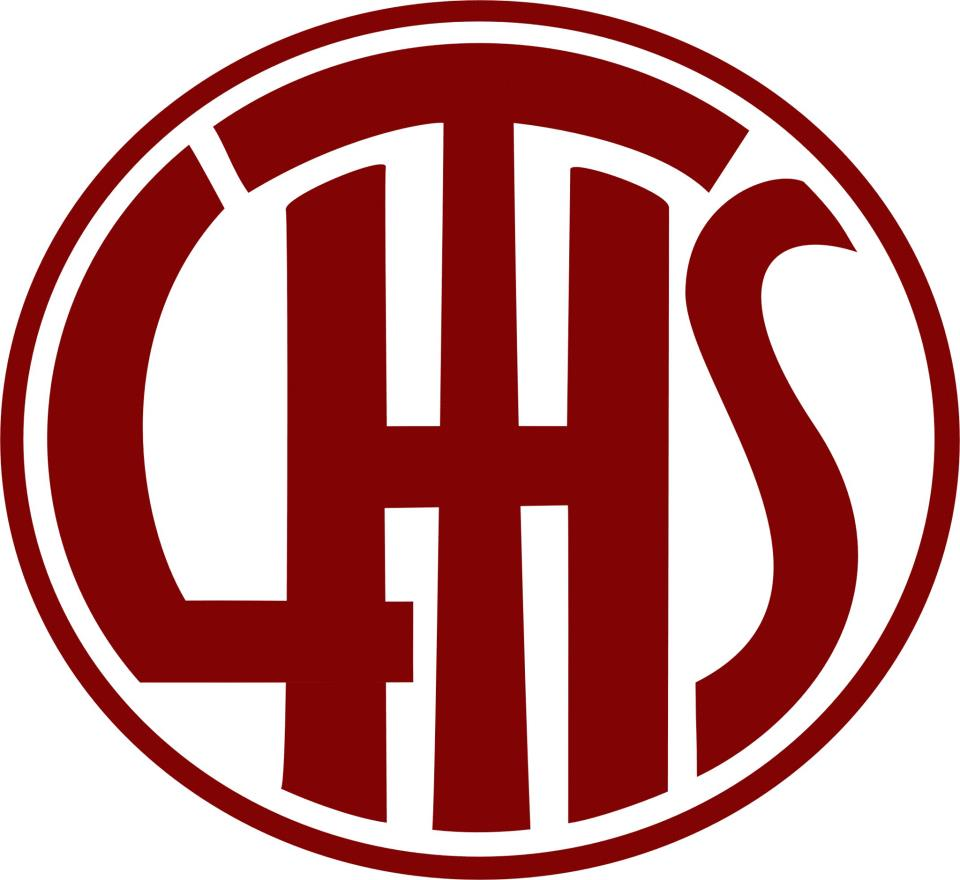

Location
- 1333 East 7th Street; Lockport, Illinois 60441; United States; 41.589025°N 88.029950°W (East Campus); 41.584285°N 87.844148°W (Central Campus)

Information
- Established: 1910
- School district: Lockport Township High School District 205
- NCES District ID: 1723350
- Superintendent: Robert McBride Jr.
- Principal (East Campus): Jacqueline Johnson
- Principal (Central Campus): Kerri Green
- Teaching staff: 227.00 (FTE)
- Enrollment: 3,817 (2023–2024)
  - Grade 9: 911
  - Grade 10: 1,003
  - Grade 11: 875
  - Grade 12: 1,028
- Colors: Maroon; White; Gold
- Fight song: Lockport Loyalty
- Athletics conference: Southwest Suburban Conference
- Mascot: Porter
- Team name: Porters
- Newspaper: The Porter Press
- Yearbook: The Lock
- Website: www.lths.org

Lockport Township High School (LTHS) is a public high school in Lockport, Illinois, United States.

In addition to the city of Lockport and Lockport Township, Lockport Township High School also serves the communities of Homer Glen, most of Crest Hill, a section of Orland Park and unincorporated Homer Township. Over 3,900 students are enrolled in grades 9 through 12.

== Campuses ==
Lockport Township High School is made up of two different campuses, Central and East.

=== Central campus ===
LTHS Central Campus

Central campus is on 1222 S Jefferson St, Lockport, Illinois. It was built in 1909 and has had many major renovations over its 110 year lifespan, including the addition of an indoor swimming pool, two gymnasiums, auditorium, cafeteria, library, and 100+ more classrooms.

Central also has a WWI Memorial Shrine outside the Main Gym called the "Veterans' Foyer".

This building is also called the "Freshman Center", as only Freshmen attend this campus.

On November 2, 2023, a plaster ceiling collapse was discovered in Room C310, located on the third floor of Central Campus. Following emergency board meetings, freshmen attended classes remotely via Google Meet from November 6 to November 14, 2023, prior to relocating to Lincoln-Way North High School.

On Monday, August 19, 2024, Central Campus reopened after undergoing renovations.

=== East campus ===
LTHS East Campus Main Entrance

East campus is located on 1333 E 7th St, Lockport, Illinois, not far from Central. East campus opened in 1964 and today serves the sophomores, juniors, and seniors. In 1998, it underwent a 307,000 foot renovation that added an indoor swimming pool with 600 seat spectator area, 800 seat auditorium, Fieldhouse, two weightlifting rooms, a cardio rooms, a media center (library), and 79 new classrooms.

In 2012, an expansion added 12 new classrooms, easing some stress off the Portable Classroom, but not enough to remove it, The schools main hallway was also doubled in size.

In 2015, The Football field grass was replaced with Artificial turf, The track and tennis courts were both redone

East Campus received another Major Renovation in 2017 which added a new atrium, 4 New Science Labs, A New Kitchen, A Pre-School Classroom with Observation Area, and 10 New Classrooms. This renovation also included the Removal of the Temporary Classrooms which had been in place since 2007.

In 2019, the Porter Stadium got a New Scoreboard with a Jumbotron and A Handicap Ramp for the Home Side Bleachers.

== History ==
Soon after settlers arrived in 1830, school classes began in a log cabin on what is now Division Street. The first village school was built in 1857, and housed students of all ages. The three-story building was built of local dolomitic limestone, with a four-sided clock tower on its roof. The first graduation commencement was June 28, 1888 with seven graduates. A fire destroyed the school on August 10, 1895. Classes were held in churches and other buildings until a new structure was ready.

In 1896 the new school opened, also built of local dolomitic limestone and on the same site. John Barnes, the Joliet architect who designed it, was trained in the Richardson Romanesque style. The new school, like its predecessor, housed all of the village students.

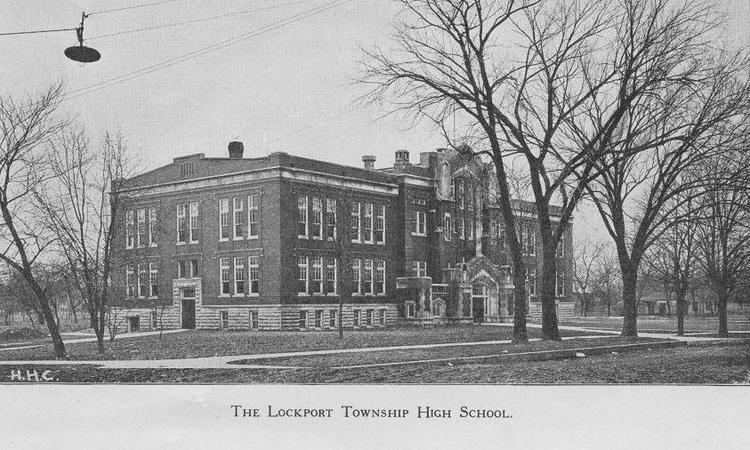
Central Campus, shortly after being built (1910)

Construction was started in 1909 on a high school at 1222 S. Jefferson. In 1910, Lockport High School opened and was accredited by the North Central Association. Major addition were made to the school s in 1930 and 1953. With these additions, the high school now occupies the entire block of Twelfth, Jefferson, Thirteenth, and Madison Streets.

In 1963, Lockport West High School opened as a four-year high school in Romeoville, and in 1964, Lockport Township High School - East Campus opened for freshmen and sophomores at 1333 E. Seventh Street. Juniors and seniors attended the older school, referred to as Lockport Township High School - Central Campus. In 1971, Lockport High School District 205 was separated into two districts. Both Lockport Central and East Campus remained in District 205, while the Lockport West Campus became Romeoville High School, part of Valley View Community Unit School District 365U.

In the spring of 1995, the communities within District 205 passed a referendum to remodel the interior of Lockport East Campus and increase its size, renovate areas of Central Campus, and upgrade and expand the technology resources and infrastructure at both campus. The renovation project enabled District 205 to house 3,000 students at East Campus and 1,000 students at Central Campus. Construction of the East Campus expansion began in September 1995. The project was finished in the fall of 1997. East Campus was designated to house grades 10–12 and Central Campus became the Freshman Center, housing grade 9. Enrollment in both campuses was 3997 students as of the start of the 2007–2008 year.

By 2009, district officials have been grappling with an influx of 1,200 students in 10 years, since Central and East Campuses both presently operate over their design capacities. The school board has proposed construction of a new high school building in Homer Glen to ease overcrowding and enable the district to close the Central Campus. In the spring of 2006, voters overwhelmingly rejected the first in a series of six referendums to provide funds for the new school. A later referendum on November 4, 2008, failed by a 55%–45% margin. Major issues of contention in the voting continue to include the proposed boundary line designating the areas to be serviced by each high school, and concerns that Homer Glen voters might try to break from the district and either form a new high school district or join with Homer Glen Elementary district 33-C. Homer Glen already has bought the land that the new high school would be built on and is waiting on the people of Lockport to stop voting down the referendum. To win support, the school board scaled back its proposals. In the sixth referendum, in April 2011, a proposal for an $85 million bond issue for the new school lost by about 1,300 votes. Mobile classrooms were installed in the northeast area of East Campus in 2007 to help reduce overcrowding.

In 2015 both East and Central Campus underwent a major rewiring allowing for Chromebook usage anywhere in the buildings, starting with the Class of 2015 and onward all students who attend LTHS receive their own Chromebook.

In 2017 the temporary classrooms were removed after a major renovation.

In January 2024, a sexual abuse lawsuit was filed against District 205 by a former Lockport student who alleged sexual abuse committed against her by one of the school's varsity basketball players in December 2022 was covered up.

== Athletics ==
The Athletics Director is Michael Dwyer and the Assistant Athletic Directors are Ann Hayes and Matt Eber.

Lockport competes in the Southwest Suburban Conference and is a member of the Illinois High School Association (IHSA), the body which governs most sports and competitive activities in the state. Teams are stylized as the Porters. School colors are Maroon, White, and Gold.

The school sponsors interscholastic teams for young men and women in badminton, baseball, basketball, bowling, cheerleading, cross country, dance team, football, golf, soccer, softball, swimming, tennis, track, volleyball, and wrestling.

The following teams have won or placed in the top four of their respective state championship competitions sponsored by the IHSA:

- Badminton (Girls): State Champions (1994–95); 3rd Place (1989–90, 1995–96)
- Baseball: State Champions (2004–05); 2nd Place (1996–97); 4th Place (1991–92); Regional Champions (1959–60, 1960–61, 1986–87, 1995–96, 2000–01, 2001–02, 2002–03, 2003–04, 2006–07, 2007–08, 2008–09, 2021–22)
- Basketball (Boys): State Champions (1977–78); 4th Place (1972–73); Regional Champions (1937–38, 1959–60, 1966–67, 1968–69, 1971–72, 1972–73, 1973–74, 1975–76, 1976–77, 1977–78, 1978–79, 1979–80, 1981–82, 1982–83, 1983–84, 1986–87, 1987–88, 1991–92, 1992–93, 1997–98, 2001–02, 2005–06, 2006–07, 2007–08, 2009–10, 2010–11); Sectional Champions (1964–65, 1967–68, 1971–72, 1972–73, 1977–78, 1978–79, 1982–83, 1986–87, 2005–06, 2006–07, 2007–08)
- Bowling (Boys): State Champions (2012–13); 2nd Place (2008–09)
- Bowling (Girls): State Champions (1993–94, 1998–99, 2008–09, 2014–15, 2019–20, 2021–22); 2nd Place (2016–17); 3rd Place (1996–97, 2015–16, 2023-2024)
- Cross Country (Boys): State Champions (1996–97, 1997–98); 3rd Place (1995–96, 1999–2000)
- Cross Country (Girls): 2nd Place (2005–06)
- Cheerleading: State Champions (2006–07, 2007–08, 2020–21); 2nd Place (2005–06, 2009–10, 2011–12, 2014–15, 2019–20); 3rd Place (2008–09, 2017–18)
- Football: State Champions (2002–03, 2003–04, 2021–22)
- Golf (Boys): 2nd Place (1965–66); 3rd Place (2000–01, 2018–19
- Golf (Girls): 2nd Place (1987–88); 3rd Place (1986–87)
- Soccer (Boys): 3rd Place (2021–22)
- Softball: State Champions (1996–97, 2003–04); 2nd Place (1986–87, 1989–90); 3rd Place (1998–99)
- Swimming (Boys): Sectional Champions (2000–01)
- Tennis (Boys): Sectional Champions (1985–86, 2002–03, 2009–10, 2014–15, 2015–16, 2016–17, 2017–18)
- Track (Boys): 3rd Place (1918–19); Sectional Champions (1997–98, 1999–2000, 2001–02, 2002–03, 2011–12)
- Volleyball (Boys): Regional Champions (1992–93, 2003–04, 2017–18, 2020–21, 2021–22); Sectional Champions (2020–21)
- Volleyball (Girls): State Champions (1993–94); 2nd Place (1990–91); 3rd Place (1984–85, 1991–92); 4th Place (1996–97)
- Wrestling: State Champions (2016–17); 3rd Place (2015–16); 4th Place (2014–15); Regional Champions (2009–10, 2011–12, 2014–15, 2015–16, 2016–17, 2017–18, 2018–19, 2019–20); Sectional Champions (1964–65)

== Notable alumni ==
- Haley Augello, qualifier for the 2016 Rio de Janeiro Olympics in 48 kg freestyle wrestling
- Phillip Brooks (CM Punk), professional wrestler (WWE, AEW, ROH & TNA), comic book writer, and former mixed martial artist.
- Ron Coomer, former MLB player for Minnesota Twins, New York Yankees and Chicago Cubs, currently radio commentator for the Cubs
- Ashley Freiberg, sports car and endurance racing driver
- Tom Haller, MLB player for San Francisco Giants and Los Angeles Dodgers, 3-time All-Star
- Kyle Higgins, comic book writer and film director
- Richaun Holmes, NBA basketball player for the Sacramento Kings
- Tony Pashos, former NFL offensive lineman for the Baltimore Ravens, Jacksonville Jaguars, San Francisco 49ers, Cleveland Browns, Washington Commanders, and Oakland Raiders
- Patience Roggensack, 26th Chief Justice of the Wisconsin Supreme Court
- Nick Setta, former CFL kicker/punter for the Hamilton Tiger-Cats
- Alando Tucker, former professional basketball player, first-round selection by Phoenix Suns in 2007 NBA draft; currently an assistant coach for the Wisconsin Badgers
- Mike Zimmer, former NFL head coach of the Minnesota Vikings
