= South Holland, Illinois =

- Village
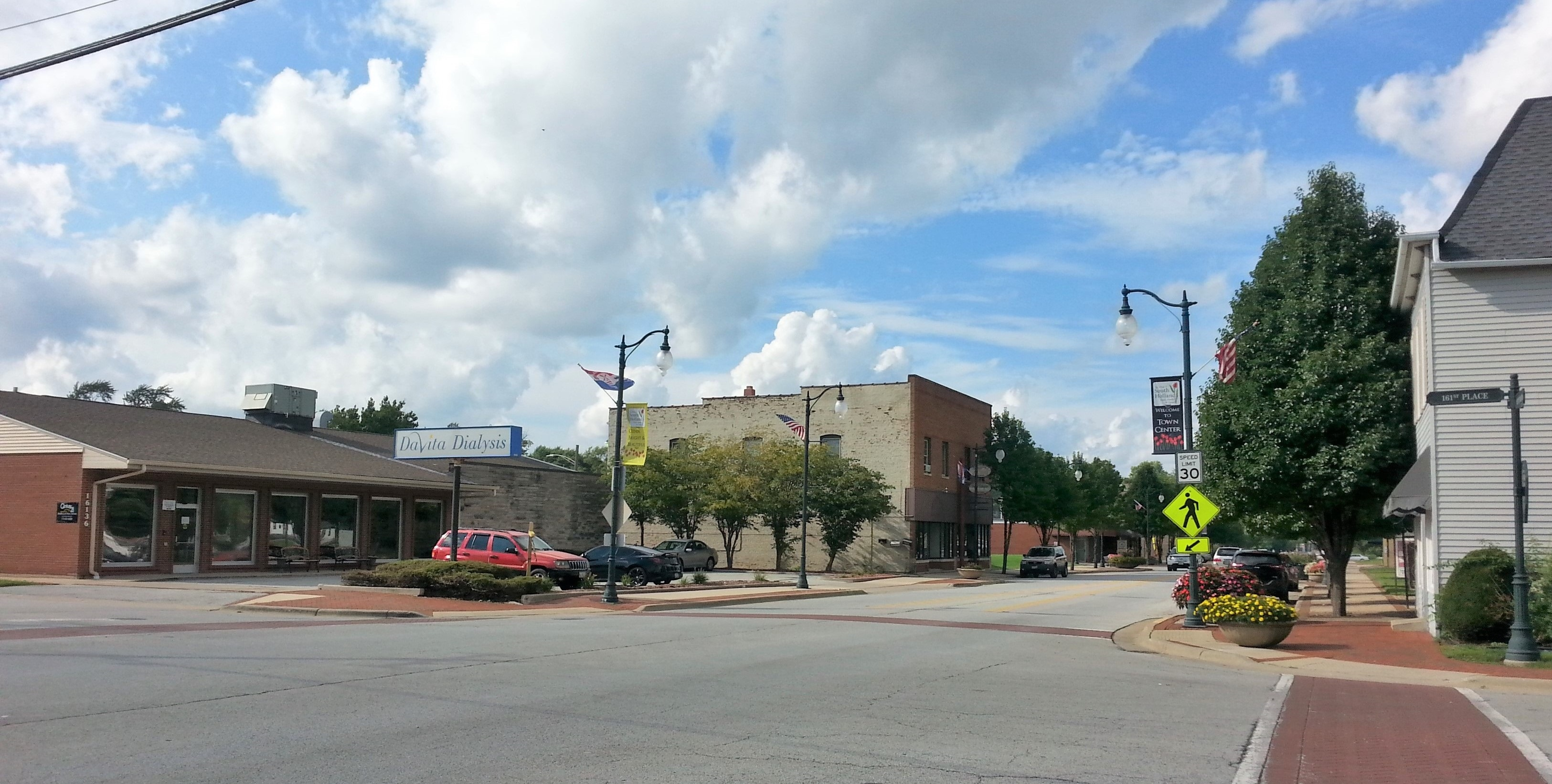
- South Holland Town Center
- Mottoes: "A Heritage of Faith; An Emphasis on Family; A Home for Our Future"
- Location of South Holland in Cook County, Illinois.

- Location within Greater Chicago Location within Illinois Location within the United States
- Coordinates: 41°36′N 87°36′W
- Country: United States
- State: Illinois
- County: Cook
- Township: Thornton
- Named for: South Holland, Netherlands
- Settled: 1847
- Incorporated: May 12, 1894

Government
  - Type: Council-Trustee
  - Body: Board of Trustees
  - Mayor: Don A. DeGraff
  - Administrator: J. Wynsma
  - Clerk: Sallie D. Penman
  - Treasurer: Beth Herman

Area
  - Total: 7.25 sq mi (18.78 km^{2})
  - Land: 7.24 sq mi (18.74 km^{2})
  - Water: 0.015 sq mi (0.04 km^{2}) 0.27%
- Elevation: 600 ft (183 m)

Population (2020)
  - Total: 21,465
  - Density: 2,966.5/sq mi (1,145.36/km^{2})

Standard of living (2009-11)
  - Per capita income: $25,887
  - Median home value: $168,600
- Time zone: UTC-6 (CST)
  - Summer (DST): UTC-5 (CDT)
- ZIP code: 60473
- Area code: 708
- FIPS code: 17-70850
- GNIS feature ID: 0418788
- Website: www.southholland.org

South Holland is a village and south suburb of Chicago in Cook County, Illinois, United States, within Thornton Township. The population was 21,465 at the 2020 census. It is named after the Dutch province of South Holland.

== History ==
The area currently occupied by South Holland, Illinois, was first settled in 1846 by immigrants from South Holland, Netherlands. When the community formally incorporated as a village in 1894, its population was about 1,000. Originally a general farming community, it later specialized in vegetable growing, especially onion sets. By the 1940s South Holland was known as the "Onion Set Capital of the World". The town was built on low ground near the Calumet River and was originally called de Laage Prairie (Low Prairie) to differentiate it from another Dutch settlement further north on higher ground and called de Hooge Prairie (now the Roseland neighborhood of Chicago).

In October 2007, Forbes.com declared South Holland to be the "Most Livable Metro-Area suburb" of the Chicago metropolitan area.

In a book called The Shortest History of Migration, the economist Ian Goldin explains the concept of chain migration or network migration by noting that 90% of Dutch migrants from South Holland to the United States settled in three American towns, one of which was South Holland, Illinois.

== Geography ==
South Holland is located at 41°36′N 87°36′W (41.60, -87.60). It is bordered by Harvey and Phoenix to the west, Dolton to the north, Thornton to the south, and Calumet City and Lansing to the east.

According to the 2010 census, South Holland has a total area of 7.286 square miles (18.87 km^{2}), of which 7.27 square miles (18.83 km^{2}) (or 99.78%) is land and 0.016 square miles (0.04 km^{2}) (or 0.22%) is water.

South Holland's addresses and numbered streets are 3 blocks ahead of Chicago's grid. For example, 159th Street is actually called 162nd Street.

=== Surrounding areas ===
Dolton
Harvey Calumet City
Phoenix / Harvey Calumet City
East Hazel Crest Lansing
Thornton

== Demographics ==
Historical population
Census	Pop.	Note	%±
1890	1,005		—
1900	766		−23.8%
1910	1,065		39.0%
1920	1,247		17.1%
1930	1,873		50.2%
1940	2,272		21.3%
1950	3,247		42.9%
1960	10,412		220.7%
1970	23,931		129.8%
1980	24,977		4.4%
1990	22,105		−11.5%
2000	22,147		0.2%
2010	22,030		−0.5%
2020	21,465		−2.6%
U.S. Decennial Census; 2010 2020

=== Racial and ethnic composition ===
South Holland, Illinois – Racial and ethnic composition Note: the US Census treats Hispanic/Latino as an ethnic category. This table excludes Latinos from the racial categories and assigns them to a separate category. Hispanics/Latinos may be of any race.
Race / Ethnicity (NH = Non-Hispanic)	Pop 1980	Pop 1990	Pop 2000	Pop 2010	Pop 2020	% 1980	% 1990	% 2000	% 2010	% 2020
White alone (NH)	24,089	18,648	9,664	4,023	2,094	96.44%	84.36%	43.64%	18.26%	9.76%
Black or African American alone (NH)	120	2,563	11,195	16,263	17,277	0.48%	11.59%	50.55%	73.82%	80.49%
Native American or Alaska Native alone (NH)	6	14	24	34	24	0.02%	0.06%	0.11%	0.15%	0.11%
Asian alone (NH)	307	371	190	135	87	1.23%	1.68%	0.86%	0.61%	0.41%
Native Hawaiian or Pacific Islander alone (NH)	1	0	2	1	1	0.00%	0.00%	0.01%	0.00%	0.00%
Other race alone (NH)	59	0	20	31	87	0.24%	0.00%	0.09%	0.14%	0.41%
Mixed race or Multiracial (NH)	x	x	216	269	478	0.00%	0.00%	0.98%	1.22%	2.23%
Hispanic or Latino (any race)	395	509	836	1,274	1,417	1.58%	2.30%	3.77%	5.78%	6.60%
Total	24,977	22,105	22,147	22,030	21,465	100.00%	100.00%	100.00%	100.00%	100.00%

=== 2020 census ===
As of the 2020 census, South Holland had a population of 21,465 and 7,452 households. The median age was 43.3 years. 21.8% of residents were under the age of 18 and 20.0% were 65 years of age or older. For every 100 females there were 84.9 males, and for every 100 females age 18 and over there were 79.8 males age 18 and over.

100.0% of residents lived in urban areas, while 0.0% lived in rural areas.

There were 7,452 households in South Holland, of which 32.4% had children under the age of 18 living in them. Of all households, 41.0% were married-couple households, 14.9% were households with a male householder and no spouse or partner present, and 39.8% were households with a female householder and no spouse or partner present. About 22.8% of all households were made up of individuals and 11.6% had someone living alone who was 65 years of age or older.

There were 7,863 housing units, of which 5.2% were vacant. The homeowner vacancy rate was 2.5% and the rental vacancy rate was 7.2%. The population density was 2,959.87 inhabitants per square mile (1,142.81/km^{2}) and the housing unit density was 1,084.25 per square mile (418.63/km^{2}). Census Bureau profile data reported 5,505 families, an average household size of 3.36, and an average family size of 2.82.

=== Income and poverty ===
The median income for a household in the village was $66,859, and the median income for a family was $79,688. Males had a median income of $41,500 versus $35,913 for females. The per capita income for the village was $28,649. About 9.3% of families and 11.2% of the population were below the poverty line, including 19.2% of those under age 18 and 11.0% of those age 65 or over.

== Government ==
South Holland is in Illinois's 2nd congressional district.

== Education ==
South Holland is served by several school districts:

- South Holland School District 150
  - Greenwood School (K-3)
  - McKinley School (4–8)
- South Holland School District 151
  - Taft School (PreK-1)
  - Eisenhower School (2–3)
  - Madison School (4–5)
  - Coolidge Junior High School (6–8)

Thornton Township High School District 205 serves all of South Holland.

Thornwood High School is located in South Holland. Thornridge High School and Thornton Township High School are also within District 205.

Two private K-8 schools, Calvin Christian School and Calvary Academy, are located in South Holland, as well as a private high school, Unity Christian Academy. Seton Academy was a Catholic co-educational high school located in the village that closed on June 30, 2016. It was formerly an all-girls school until 2003 when boys were admitted. Christ our Savior School and Holy Ghost School were once in South Holland, but both have been closed by the Chicago Archdiocese. Apostolic Kingdom Christian Academy has also been closed.

South Holland is home to the main campus of South Suburban College.

== Transportation ==
Pace provides bus service on multiple routes connecting South Holland to destinations across the Southland.

== Notable people ==
- Liz Bouck-Jagielski, collegiate softball coach
- Eddy Curry, forward for the Chicago Bulls, New York Knicks, and Miami Heat
- Kevin DeYoung, pastor, author
- Kevin Drumm, musician
- Cliff Floyd, All-Star outfielder for seven Major League Baseball teams
- Ron Hicks (born 1967), archbishop-designate of New York, currently bishop of the Diocese of Joliet (2020–2026). He was a childhood resident of South Holland.
- Norman J. Kansfield, minister noted for being suspended after officiating at his daughter's same-sex marriage
- James Meeks, state senator, representing Illinois' 15th district
- Mark Mulder, pitcher for the Oakland Athletics and St. Louis Cardinals
- Frederick Nymeyer, industrialist, author, and publisher
- Robert F. Prevost, Pope Leo XIV, noted for being the 1st American Pope
- Robert Shaw, former Chicago alderman and former commissioner of the Cook County Board of Review
- Steve Trout, pitcher for the Chicago White Sox, Chicago Cubs, New York Yankees, and Seattle Mariners
- Jason Weaver, actor and singer

== In literature ==
The 1925 Pulitzer Prize-winning novel So Big by Edna Ferber is set in South Holland. The Widow Paarlberg inspired one of the main characters and her family farm is preserved in a municipal park.

The 2021 novel "Termination Shock" by Neal Stephenson includes a lead character, child of a conservative Dutch father and Indonesian mother, who spends his childhood in South Holland during the 1950s and 1960s. Though the town isn't named its description in the novel fits only South Holland, Illinois during that time period.
