= Bradley-Bourbonnais Community High School =

Coordinates: 41.1486°N 87.8697°W

Bradley-Bourbonnais High School

Location
- 700 West North Street; Bradley, Illinois 60915; United States

Information
- School type: Public Secondary
- Motto: Built on tradition...Preparing for the future
- School district: Bradley-Bourbonnais Community High School District 307
- Superintendent: Matthew Vosberg
- Principal: Evan Tingley
- Teaching staff: 126.00 (on an FTE basis)
- Grades: 9–12
- Enrollment: 1,913 (2023–24)
- Student to teacher ratio: 15.18
- Colors: Red; White; Black
- Athletics conference: Southwest Suburban
- Team name: Boilermakers
- Feeder schools: Bourbonnais Upper Grade Center (District 53); Bradley Central Middle School (District 61); St. George School (District 258); St. Paul's Lutheran School (Private District)
- Website: www.bbchs.org

Bradley-Bourbonnais Community High School is a comprehensive public four-year high school located in Bradley, Illinois. It is the only school in District 307. As of 2020 the school has an enrollment of 2,026 students. Bradley Bourbonnais offers a variety of AP classes. It serves the communities of Bradley, Bourbonnais, a portion of Kankakee as well as surrounding unincorporated areas. Its feeder districts are Bradley (61), Bourbonnais (53) and St. George (258) school districts.

The student body is 71% White, 12% Hispanic, 11% Black, 2% Asian, 4% two or more races, 0.1% American Indian, and 0% Hawaiian Native/Pacific Islander. 29% of students are minorities. 37% of students were eligible for the Free Lunch Program and 6% for the Reduced-Price Lunch Program.

About 900 students participate in interscholastic sports. The Bradley-Bourbonnais Boilermakers compete in the Southwest Suburban Conference and the Illinois High School Association. Sixty competitive teams in 24 sports. The superintendent is Dr. Matthew Vosberg.

In 2020, U.S. News & World Report considered Bradley-Bourbonnais a silver level high school.

== Athletics ==
The athletic director is Mike Kohl.

Bradley-Bourbonnais competes as a member of the Southwest Suburban Conference. The school is also member of the Illinois High School Association (IHSA), which governs most athletics and competitive activities in the State of Illinois. Teams are named the "Boilermakers".

The school sponsors interscholastic teams for young men and women in Basketball, Bowling, Cross Country, Golf, Soccer (coed), Swimming, Tennis, Track, Volleyball, and Water Polo. Young women may compete in Badminton, Cheerleading, Dance, Softball, and Volleyball, while young men may also compete in Baseball, Football, and Wrestling.

== Activities and clubs ==
- Art Club
- Best Buddies
- Chess Club
- Drama Club
- Ecology Club
- French Club
- Gay-Straight Alliance (GSA)
- Leo's Club
- Literary Magazine
- Mathletes
- National Art Honor Society (NAHS)
- National Honor Society (NHS)
- Natural Helpers
- Red Surge
- Robotics
- SADD (Students Against Destructive Decisions)
- Scholastic Bowl
- Spanish Club
- Speech Team
- Student Council
- SWSC Science
- Theater
- Tri-M Music Honor Society
- Youth and Government

== Facilities ==
BB facilities include 96 classrooms, three gymnasiums, an Olympic-sized pool, a weight room and fitness center, a community center, a 600-seat theater, and 1:1 Google chromebook laptops.

== Notable alumni ==
- Jason Buhrmester, author/journalist
- Owen Freeman, basketball player
- Colin Holderman, baseball player
- Tom Prince, MLB Pro Baseball Player
