= Phoenix, Illinois =

- Village
- Seal

- Location of Phoenix in Cook County, Illinois.

- Location within Greater Chicago Location within Illinois Location within the United States
- Coordinates: 41°36′44″N 87°37′50″W
- Country: United States
- State: Illinois
- County: Cook
- Township: Thornton

Government
  - Mayor: Terry Wells

Area
  - Total: 0.46 sq mi (1.20 km^{2})
  - Land: 0.46 sq mi (1.20 km^{2})
  - Water: 0 sq mi (0.00 km^{2})

Population (2020)
  - Total: 1,708
  - Density: 3,683.9/sq mi (1,422.38/km^{2})
- Time zone: UTC-6 (CST)
  - Summer (DST): UTC-5 (CDT)
- ZIP Code(s): 60426
- Area code: 708
- FIPS code: 17-59572
- Website: villageofphoenix.com

Phoenix is a village and south suburb in Cook County, Illinois, United States. The population was 1,708 at the 2020 census. It is located approximately 19 miles (31 km) south of the Chicago Loop in the Chicago metropolitan area.

== History ==
The development of Phoenix is closely tied to its larger neighbor, Harvey. Harvey was established as an industrial city with no saloons. Many of its early factories were located between the Illinois Central Railroad and Harvey's eastern boundary at Halsted Street. One local businessman, William McLatchy, owned a large tract of land in an unincorporated area outside of Harvey. Soon, five saloons had opened in the area and a small housing subdivision known as Phenix Park was constructed during the 1890s. City leaders in Harvey, seeing businesses just outside their boundaries selling alcohol to local workers, sought to annex Phenix Park and render it "dry" or free of alcohol-related establishments. The residents of Phoenix Park wanted to retain local control of their affairs as an independent village. On August 29, 1900, an election was held to determine the future status of the area. A total of 56 votes were cast with 38 (67.9%) voting in favor of incorporation and 18 (32.1%) against. Despite legal challenges from Harvey, the result was upheld.

After incorporation, the name Phenix Park was changed to Phoenix. By 1910, the village had a population of 500, with most residents being of either Dutch or Polish ancestry. The first African Americans moved to Phoenix in 1915. Most came from Chicago and the South. Industry in Harvey and the railroads provided a strong employment base for Phoenix residents. The African American population steadily increased during the 1920s. By 1930, the village was home to 3,033 people. The demographic makeup of the community was 84.2% White, 15.1% Black, and 0.7% other. Growth continued through the 1940s and 1950s. New housing was constructed to accommodate this growth. The population in 1960 was 4,203. At this time, Phoenix had a diverse ethnic composition but the community was racially segregated. African Americans, comprising 65.3% of the population, lived in the northern portion of the village while Whites, forming 34.7% of the population, lived in the southern portion of Phoenix. In 1960, the municipal administration of Phoenix voted to de-annex the predominantly White portion of the village into Harvey. The de-annexation occurred in 1962 and with it, Phoenix lost one-third of its population as well as 60% of its tax base.

By 1990, the population was 2,217.

On October 16, 1979, Phoenix Mayor William Hawkins was shot and fatally wounded in an ambush outside of his home. He died two days later. Bobby Joe Anderson, a city policeman, was indicted 13 years later for the crime and was convicted of first degree murder in the killing of Hawkins.

== Geography ==
Phoenix is located at 41°36′44″N 87°37′50″W (41.612333, -87.630545) in southern Cook County. The village is nestled between Harvey and South Holland.

According to the 2010 census, Phoenix has a total area of 0.45 square miles (1.17 km^{2}), all land.

=== Surrounding areas ===
Harvey
Harvey South Holland
Harvey South Holland
Harvey South Holland
Harvey / South Holland

== Demographics ==
Historical population
Census	Pop.	Note	%±
1910	679		—
1920	1,933		184.7%
1930	3,033		56.9%
1940	2,875		−5.2%
1950	3,606		25.4%
1960	4,203		16.6%
1970	3,596		−14.4%
1980	2,850		−20.7%
1990	2,217		−22.2%
2000	2,157		−2.7%
2010	1,964		−8.9%
2020	1,708		−13.0%
U.S. Decennial Census; 2010 2020

=== Racial and ethnic composition ===
Phoenix village, Illinois – Racial and ethnic composition Note: the US Census treats Hispanic/Latino as an ethnic category. This table excludes Latinos from the racial categories and assigns them to a separate category. Hispanics/Latinos may be of any race.
Race / Ethnicity (NH = Non-Hispanic)	Pop 2000	Pop 2010	Pop 2020	% 2000	% 2010	% 2020
White alone (NH)	29	28	14	1.34%	1.43%	0.82%
Black or African American alone (NH)	2,009	1,781	1,445	93.14%	90.68%	84.60%
Native American or Alaska Native alone (NH)	5	6	7	0.23%	0.31%	0.41%
Asian alone (NH)	1	3	4	0.05%	0.15%	0.23%
Pacific Islander alone (NH)	0	0	2	0.00%	0.00%	0.12%
Other race alone (NH)	4	0	13	0.19%	0.00%	0.76%
Mixed race or Multiracial (NH)	22	30	19	1.02%	1.53%	1.11%
Hispanic or Latino (any race)	87	116	204	4.03%	5.91%	11.94%
Total	2,157	1,964	1,708	100.00%	100.00%	100.00%

=== 2020 census ===
As of the 2020 census, Phoenix had a population of 1,708. The median age was 44.1 years. 19.6% of residents were under the age of 18 and 21.9% were 65 years of age or older. For every 100 females there were 84.4 males, and for every 100 females age 18 and over there were 82.5 males age 18 and over.

The population density was 3,681.03 inhabitants per square mile (1,421.25/km^{2}). There were 825 housing units at an average density of 1,778.02 per square mile (686.50/km^{2}).

100.0% of residents lived in urban areas, while 0.0% lived in rural areas.

There were 742 households in Phoenix, of which 26.5% had children under the age of 18 living in them. Of all households, 19.5% were married-couple households, 26.8% were households with a male householder and no spouse or partner present, and 50.4% were households with a female householder and no spouse or partner present. About 42.6% of all households were made up of individuals and 20.6% had someone living alone who was 65 years of age or older.

Of the village's housing units, 10.1% were vacant. The homeowner vacancy rate was 3.3% and the rental vacancy rate was 7.9%.

=== Income and poverty ===
The median income for a household in the village was $30,455, and the median income for a family was $44,076. Males had a median income of $25,586 versus $30,313 for females. The per capita income for the village was $20,421. About 26.4% of families and 29.1% of the population were below the poverty line, including 32.4% of those under age 18 and 16.9% of those age 65 or over.

== Government ==
Phoenix is in Illinois's 2nd congressional district.

== Transportation ==
Pace provides bus service on Route 348 connecting Phoenix to destinations across the Southland.

== Notable people ==
- Quinn Buckner (born 1954), former professional basketball player and coach. He was a childhood resident of Phoenix.
- Kevin Duckworth (1964–2008), professional basketball player. He was a childhood resident of Phoenix.
- Sam Mack (born 1970), former professional basketball player. He was a childhood resident of Phoenix.
- Claude Steele (born 1946), psychologist. He was a childhood resident of Phoenix.
- Shelby Steele (born 1946), academic and recipient of the National Medal of the Humanities. He was a childhood resident of Phoenix.
- Melvin Van Peebles (1932–2021), actor, filmmaker, playwright, novelist and composer. He was a childhood resident of Phoenix.
