= Kankakee High School =

Location
- 1200 W. Jeffery Street; Kankakee, Kankakee County, Illinois 60901; United States; 41°06′18″N 87°53′07″W

Information
- Former names: Eastridge High School (1966-83); Westview High School (1966-83)
- Type: Public Secondary
- Established: 1965
- School district: Kankakee School District 111
- Superintendent: Teresa Lance
- Principal: Albert Brass
- Teaching staff: 84.10 (on an FTE basis)
- Grades: 9–12
- Gender: Coed
- Enrollment: 1,447 (2023-2024)
  - Grade 9: 336 students
  - Grade 10: 343 students
  - Grade 11: 374 students
  - Grade 12: 394 students
- Student to teacher ratio: 17.21
- Schedule: 7:25 a.m. - 2:40 p.m.
- Campus: Suburban
- Colors: Columbia Blue; Maroon
- Athletics conference: Southland Athletic Conference
- Nickname: Kays (Boys); Lady Kays (Girls)
- Rivals: Bradley-Bourbonnais Community High School; Bishop McNamara High School (Kankakee, Illinois)
- Accreditation: Illinois State Board of Education
- Feeder schools: Lincoln Cultural Center; Montessori Magnet School; Kankakee Junior High School
- Website: khs.ksd111.org

Kankakee High School (KHS) is a public secondary school in Kankakee, Illinois and is part of the Kankakee School District 111. KHS serves grades nine through twelve.

== History ==
Kankakee High School was established in 1906 and served students until 1966. In 1966, KHS split into two schools*, one called Kankakee Eastridge High School (team named the Raiders, colors navy and orange) and the other called Kankakee Westview High School (team named the Kayhawks, colors old gold and Columbia blue). These two schools operated until 1983 when it unified once again (beginning with the academic year 1984) to form the "new" Kankakee High School (team name Kays, colors maroon and Columbia blue). The new KHS location, serving grades 9-12, occupied the former Westview building, with the former Eastridge building becoming Kankakee's junior high school (serving grades 7 and 8).

- Interestingly, the new high schools were duplicates of each other architecturally.

== Athletics ==
KHS currently has the following sports:

- Football
- Flag Football (girls only)
- Basketball (boys and girls)
- Baseball
- Softball
- Volleyball (boys and girls)
- Swimming (boys and girls)
- Soccer (boys and girls)
- Track (boys and girls)
- Cross Country (boys and girls)
- Cheerleading
- Tennis (boys and girls)
- Powerlifting (boys and girls)
- Wrestling (boys and girls)
- Bowling (boys and girls)
- Golf (boys and girls)
- Esports

== Demographics ==
- Black: 44.5%
- Hispanic: 33.4%
- White: 20.8%
- Asian: 0.5%
- Native American: 0%
- Other: 0.9%

== Notable alumni ==
- Jyaire Hill, college football cornerback for the Michigan Wolverines
- Keagen Trost, NFL offensive tackle for the Los Angeles Rams

== Sources ==
Kankakee High School / Homepage. (2023)
