= Thornridge High School =

Location
- 15000 Cottage Grove Avenue; South Suburbs; Dolton, Cook County, Illinois 60419; United States; 41.6189°N 87.6001°W

Information
- School type: Public
- Opened: 1960
- School district: District 205
- Superintendent: Dr. Nathaniel Cunningham Jr.
- Dean: Christy Lewis; Tammy King; Joshua Reyna
- Principal: William Brown
- Assistant Principal: Carol Friedl
- Teaching staff: 63.00 (FTE)
- Grades: 9–12
- Gender: Coed
- Enrollment: 1200 (2025-2026)
- Average class size: 21.5
- Student to teacher ratio: 15.38
- Campus type: Suburban
- Colors: Columbia Blue; Navy Blue
- Slogan: "We are TR"
- Athletics conference: Southland Athletic Conference
- Mascot: Wing Ding the Mighty Falcon
- Rival: Thornton; Thornwood
- Newspaper: Bagpipe
- Yearbook: Piper
- Communities served: Dolton, Harvey, South Holland, Phoenix, Burnham, Calumet City, and Markham
- Feeder schools: George S. Patton School; Washington Jr. High School; Lincoln Jr. High School; Roosevelt Jr. High School; Dirksen Middle School
- Website: thornridge.district205.net

Thornridge High School is a public four-year high school located in Dolton, Illinois, a suburb about 20 miles south of Chicago. The school is part of Thornton Township High School District 205. Thornridge High School first opened to the public in 1960 after completing construction of the current building. It serves the cities/villages of Dolton, Harvey, South Holland, Phoenix, Burnham, Calumet City, and Markham.

== Academics ==
As of 2024, total student attendance is 85%. The graduation rate is 79.8%. In 2020, Thornridge was ranked a commendable school according to the U.S. News & World Report.

== Demographics ==
96% of students at Thornridge are African American, 3% are Hispanic, and 0.4% are White. The gender makeup is 47.5% male and 52.5% female. 77% of students were eligible for the Free Lunch Program.

== Activities ==
Thornridge is known for its success in the performing arts and competitive public speaking. The following teams have placed in the top four of their respective state championship competitions sponsored by the IHSA.

- Debate: State Champions (1976); 2nd place (1973, 1978)
- Drama: State Champions (1971–72, 1989–90, 2003–04, 2004–05, 2008); 2nd Place (1970, 1974, 1976, 1982, 1985, 1989, 2006); 3rd Place (1977, 1979, 1983); 4th Place (2002)
- Group Interpretation: State Champions (1975, 1994, 2003); 2nd Place (1981, 1998, 2001, 2004); 4th Place (1997, 2000)
- Individual Events: State Champions (1968, 1969, 1970, 1971); 3rd Place (1985, 1994); 4th Place (1965, 1981, 1983, 1990)
- Speech: State Champions (1968, 1970); 2nd Place (1971, 1972), 4th Place (1969)

== Athletics ==
The Falcons compete in the Southland Athletic Conference (SAC) as well the state championship series sponsored by the Illinois High School Association (IHSA) which governs most athletic and competitive activities in Illinois. School colors are Columbia Blue and Navy. Teams are called the "Falcons".

The school sponsors interscholastic teams for both young men and women in basketball, bowling, cross country, soccer, tennis, and track & field. Young men compete in baseball, football, swimming and diving and wrestling. Young women compete in cheerleading, competitive dancing, softball, and volleyball.

The following teams won or placed in the top four of their respective class in their respective sports in IHSA sponsored state championship series:

- Basketball (Boys):State Champions (1971, 1972)
- Football: State Champions (1970)
- Track and Field (Boys): 4x880 1st Place (1978)

== Notable alumni ==
- Quinn Buckner (class of 1972), a former NBA player who led Thornridge to 1971 and 1972 IHSA state basketball championships; was co-captain of the 1976 NCAA Tournament champion Indiana Hoosiers, later winning a title for the 1984 NBA champion Boston Celtics; was head coach for the Dallas Mavericks; and won a gold medal with the US National Basketball Team in the 1976 Summer Olympics;
- David Clayton, a human rights activist who was named to the IHSA All-Star Cast for his performance in The Firebugs in 1972
- Kevin Duckworth (class of 1982), a 2x All-Star NBA center (1986–97)
- Nelsan Ellis (November 30, 1977 – July 8, 2017), an actor and playwright. He is best known for his role in series True Blood (2008–2014), for which he won a Satellite Award from the International Press Academy, among his other accolades.
- Reggie Hayward, a former defensive end who played nine seasons in the National Football League (NFL) for the Denver Broncos and Jacksonville Jaguars
- Tiffany Henyard, politician
- Syleena Johnson, a Grammy-nominated R&B singer and TV reality show star
- Jane Lynch, an actress, comedian, and singer; is best known for starring as Sue Sylvester in television series Glee, as Calhoun in the series Wreck-It Ralph and in various Christopher Guest-directed films like A Mighty Wind, and Best in Show; host of TV's Hollywood Game Night
- Sam Mack, a former NBA guard
- LisaRaye McCoy (class of 1986), a film and television actress (The Players Club, Single Ladies)
- Richard Roeper, a Chicago Sun-Times columnist and film critic who co-hosted At the Movies with Roger Ebert
- Joe Skalski, former alumni of Thornridge High later attending Saint Xavier University, and drafted by the Cleveland Indians in the 3rd round of the 1986 MLB Draft, pitching for the organization until 1990.
- Frank Zuccarelli, longtime supervisor of Thornton Township, Cook County, Illinois
