= Thornwood High School =

Location
- 17101 South Park Ave. South Holland, Illinois 60473; United States; 41.58343°N 87.60539°W

Information
- Type: Public
- Established: 1972
- School district: Thornton Township High School District 205
- Superintendent: Dr. Nathaniel Cunningham Jr.
- Principal: Don C. Holmes
- Assistant principal: Thomas Walsh
- Staff: 143.00 (on an FTE basis)
- Grades: 9-12
- Gender: Co-ed
- Enrollment: 1,843 (2024-2025)
- Student to teacher ratio: 12.89
- Colors: Navy blue Gold
- Athletics conference: Southland Athletic Conference
- Feeder schools: McKinley Junior High School; Wolcott School Barack H. Obama Learning Academy Jesse White Learning Academy
- Website: thornwood.district205.net

Thornwood High School is a public high school located in South Holland, Illinois, United States. It was built as part of Thornton Township High School District 205. It opened in 1971 to accommodate overcrowding at other District 205 schools, Thornridge High and Thornton Township High School.

== Notable alumni ==
- Freddie Banks (class of 2006) – College football coach
- Michael Blair (class of 1992) – retired NFL football Running Back; played for the Cincinnati Bengals and Green Bay Packers
- Liz Bouck-Jagielski (class of 2000) – DePaul University softball team head coach since 2025. Played for the Blue Demons from 2000 to 2003 and became a DePaul Hall of Famer in 2019.
- Darrell Campbell (class of 1999) – former NFL Defensive Lineman; played for the Chicago Bears, Cleveland Browns, Tampa Bay Buccaneers, and Baltimore Ravens
- Eddy Curry (class of 2001) – Former NBA Center; played for the Chicago Bulls, New York Knicks, 2012 NBA Champion Miami Heat, and Dallas Mavericks
- T. C. Dantzler – Greco-Roman wrestler; two-time U.S. national champion, five-time U.S. world wrestling team member
- Matt Doherty – actor
- Floyd Fields (class of 1987) – Former NFL football safety for the San Diego Chargers
- Cliff Floyd (class of 1991) – MLB baseball left-fielder; won 1997 World Series championship with Florida Marlins
- Michial Foy (class of 1980) – Former Olympic wrestler
- Reggie Hamilton (class of 2007) – Undrafted professional basketball player
- Justin Huisman (class of 1997) – Former MLB baseball pitcher; pitched for the Kansas City Royals
- Mark Konkol – Reporter for Chicago Sun-Times; 2011 Pulitzer Prize recipient
- Neil Magny (class of 2006) – Professional MMA fighter competing in UFC
- David Moss (class of 2002) – Professional basketball player
- Mark Mulder – Former MLB baseball pitcher; pitched for the Oakland Athletics and St. Louis Cardinals
- Brittani Nichols (class of 2006) – Actress, producer, and writer
- DJ Rashad (class of 1998) – DJ, pioneer of Chicago footwork
- Bill Roe – Former NFL football Linebacker
- Donte Thomas (class of 2014) – Professional basketball player
- Reggie Torian (class of 1993) – 1999 silver medalist in 110m hurdles at World Championships; NCAA indoor 60m hurdle record holder
- Steve Trout (class of 1976) – Former MLB baseball pitcher; pitched for the Chicago White Sox, Chicago Cubs, New York Yankees, and Seattle Mariners
- Michelle Venturella – 2000 United States Olympic softball gold medalist
- Jason Weaver – R&B singer and actor
- Justin Williams (class of 2002) – Former NBA basketball Power forward-Center; currently plays in Italy
- Bill Zehme – Biographer (Frank Sinatra, Andy Kaufman, Jay Leno, Hugh Hefner); writer for Rolling Stone, Esquire, Vanity Fair, Playboy.
