= Thornton Fractional Township High School District 215 =

School district in Illinois, United States

Thornton Fractional High School District 215

Address
- 18601 Torrence Ave Lansing, Cook, Illinois, 60438; United States

District information
- Grades: 9-12
- Superintendent: Raymond Williams (Acting)
- Asst. superintendent(s): Eric Mastey, Becky Szuba
- School board: Jacqueline Terrazas (President), Dominique Newman (Vice President), Millie Myers (Secretary), Charlotte Guyton, Vanessa Calderon-Miranda, Cynthia Perkins, Glenn Williams
- Schools: 4
- Budget: $172.5 million (2023)
- NCES District ID: 1738940

Students and staff
- Students: 3,310
- Teachers: 212
- Staff: 292

Other information
- Website: https://www.tfd215.org/

Thornton Fractional Township High School District 215, more commonly known as T.F. District 215, is composed of two high schools, the supplementary Center for Academics and Technology, and the Center for Alternative Learning. The reference of 'Fractional' in the district's and school names originates not from a person, but from the district being created in 1926 out of a "fractional" portion of Thornton Township from the Thornton Township High School District 205 serving the township's remainder.

Because of their long names, among administrators and students alike, they are commonly referred to as T.F. North, T.F. South, and the CAT and CAL Centers.

== High schools ==
- Thornton Fractional Township North High School, in Calumet City, Illinois
- Thornton Fractional Township South High School, in Lansing, Illinois
- The Thornton Fractional Center for Academics and Technology, also in Calumet City
- The Thornton Fractional Center for Alternative Learning, also in Calumet City
