= Thornton Township High School District 205 =

School district in Illinois, United States

Location
- 465 E. 170th St. South Holland, Illinois 60473 Cook County

District information
- Motto: "Knowledge Is Power"
- Superintendent: Dr. Nathaniel Cunningham Jr., Dr. Jerry B. Doss (Associate)
- Asst. superintendent(s): Mr. Brett Fickes, Mr. Toriano Horton
- School board: Ms. Nina Graham (President), Mrs. Almetta Vasser-Moody (Vice President), Dr. Kara Davis (Secretary), Mr. Ray C. Banks, Mr. Stanley H. Brown, Mrs. Bernadette Lawrence, Mr. Stafford Owens
- Schools: Thornridge High School Thornwood High School Thornton Township High School
- Budget: $130.1 million (2020)

Students and staff
- Students: 4,748
- Athletic conference: Southland Athletic Conference

Other information
- Website: www.district205.net

Thornton Township High School District 205 is a consolidated high school district based in South Holland, Illinois that serves much of Cook County's Thornton Township. The district is located south of the city of Chicago; the township's northern border matches up with the southern border of the city proper.

District 205 is composed of three high schools, all located in different towns throughout Thornton Township. Thornton Township High School is located in the western reaches of Thornton Township in the Village of Harvey, and is led by principal Mr. Todd Whitaker. Another high school in the district is Thornridge High School in the City of Dolton, a village located at the northern border of the township. The principal of Thornridge High School is Dr. Justin Moore. the third district school is Thornwood High School, which is located in the township seat of South Holland; Thornwood's principal is Dr. Don C. Holmes. The district superintendent is Dr. Nathaniel Cunningham.
