= Al Riley =

American politician

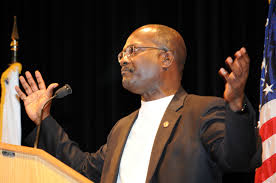

Member of the Illinois House of Representatives from the 38th district
- In office January 2007 – January 2019
- Preceded by: Robin Kelly
- Succeeded by: Debbie Meyers-Martin

Rich Township Supervisor
- In office August 2005 – May 2021
- Succeeded by: Calvin Jordan

Personal details
- Born: March 4, 1953 (age 73) Chicago, Illinois
- Party: Democratic
- Education: University of Illinois; Chicago State University
- Profession: Statistician; Urban Planner

Military service
- Allegiance: United States
- Branch/service: U.S. Army; U.S. Army Reserve
- Years of service: 1972-1978
- Unit: Civil Affairs

Al Riley (born March 4, 1953) is a former Democratic member of the Illinois House of Representatives, representing the 38th District between January, 2007 and January 2019. The district includes all or portions of Country Club Hills, Flossmoor, Frankfort, Frankfort Square, Hazel Crest, Homewood, Markham, Matteson, Oak Forest, Olympia Fields, Park Forest, Richton Park, Tinley Park, and University Park.

On September 26, 2017, Riley announced he would not seek reelection to a seventh term.

== Early life ==
Riley is an urban planner and statistician by profession, having published and conducted research in the fields of education, economic analysis, cancer clinical trials and health planning. He held executive positions in higher education, county government, medical research and the private sector. His education includes: B.A., Economic Geography/Secondary Education, Chicago State University; Masters, Urban Planning and Policy Analysis and Doctoral study in Economic Policy Analysis, University of Illinois at Chicago.

Previous or current professional, elected and civic positions include: Adjunct Professor, Business and Public Administration, Governors State University (1997–2011); Trustee, Village of Olympia Fields (1994–2005); Trustee, Rich Township (2005); member, American Institute of Certified Planners; American Planning Association; member, UIC College of Urban Planning and Public Administration Alumni Board; American Statistical Association, Executive Board, Calumet Council, Boy Scouts of America; and the Illinois Philharmonic Orchestra Board. He served in the United States Army in active and reserve roles in the branches of Psychological Operations and Civil Affairs (1972–78).

== Political career ==
Riley held the position of Assistant Majority Leader in the Illinois House of Representatives for two terms during his twelve-year tenure. Riley also holds the elected position of Rich Township Supervisor in Cook County, Illinois. He has held this position since 2006. Riley is also one of two State Central Committeemen from the Second Congressional District of Illinois, a position he shares with Robin Kelly, Congresswoman of the Second Congressional District.

A member of seven House committees and five subcommittees in his last term, Riley chaired the important House Committee on State Government Administration. He is also a member of the bipartisan, bicameral Commission on Government Forecasting and Accountability (COGFA), which "is mandated to report to the General Assembly on economic trends in relation to long-range planning and budgeting; and to study and make such recommendations as it deems appropriate on local and regional economic and fiscal policies and on federal fiscal policy as it may affect Illinois".
