= Rich Township, Illinois =

Rich Township
- Township
- Flag Seal

- Location in Cook County

- Cook County's location in Illinois
- Coordinates: 41°30′45″N 87°43′56″W
- Country: United States
- State: Illinois
- County: Cook

Area
  - Total: 36.59 sq mi (94.78 km^{2})
  - Land: 36.36 sq mi (94.17 km^{2})
  - Water: 0.24 sq mi (0.61 km^{2}) 0.64%
- Elevation: 709 ft (216 m)

Population (2020)
  - Total: 76,138
  - Density: 2,094/sq mi (808.5/km^{2})
- Time zone: UTC-6 (CST)
  - Summer (DST): UTC-5 (CDT)
- ZIP codes: 60422, 60423, 60429, 60430, 60443, 60461, 60466, 60471, 60477, 60478
- FIPS code: 17-031-63498
- Website: www.richtownship.org

Rich Township is one of 29 townships in Cook County, Illinois, United States located south of Chicago. As of the 2020 census, its population was 76,138. Richton Park serves as the governmental seat for the township.

== Geography ==
According to the United States Census Bureau, Rich Township covers an area of 36.59 square miles (94.8 km^{2}); of this, 36.36 square miles (94.2 km^{2}) (99.36 percent) is land and 0.24 square miles (0.62 km^{2}) (0.64 percent) is water.

=== Cities, towns, villages ===
- Country Club Hills (south half)
- Flossmoor (west three-quarters)
- Frankfort (small portion)
- Hazel Crest (small portion)
- Homewood (small portion)
- Matteson
- Olympia Fields (vast majority)
- Park Forest (north three-quarters)
- Richton Park
- Tinley Park (small portion)
- University Park (small portion)

=== Unincorporated towns ===
- Flossmoor Highlands at 41.54564°N 87.7138°W

=== Adjacent townships ===
- Bremen Township (north)
- Thornton Township (northeast)
- Bloom Township (east)
- Monee Township, Will County (south)
- Green Garden Township, Will County (southwest)
- Frankfort Township, Will County (west)
- Orland Township (northwest)

=== Cemeteries ===
The township contains these eight cemeteries: Coopers Grove, Elliott Family, Lutheran, New German Evangelical Zion, Saint Anne, Saint Pauls Evangelical Lutheran, Saint Pauls Evangelical Reform and Zion Evangelical Lutheran.

=== Major highways ===
- Interstate 57
- Interstate 80
- U.S. Route 45
- U.S. Route 30
- Illinois Route 43
- Illinois Route 50

=== Airports and landing strips ===
- Olympia Fields Osteopathic Medical Center Heliport
- Prosperi Airport (historical)

=== Other Places ===
- Lincoln Mall

=== Landmarks ===
- Augustinian Seminary
- South Green Belt Forest Preserve (vast majority)

== Demographics ==
Rich Township, Illinois – Racial and ethnic composition Note: the US Census treats Hispanic/Latino as an ethnic category. This table excludes Latinos from the racial categories and assigns them to a separate category. Hispanics/Latinos may be of any race.
Race / Ethnicity (NH = Non-Hispanic)	Pop 2000	Pop 2010	Pop 2020	% 2000	% 2010	% 2020
White alone (NH)	29,577	18,803	12,125	43.74%	24.51%	15.93%
Black or African American alone (NH)	33,306	51,984	55,964	49.25%	67.75%	73.50%
Native American or Alaska Native alone (NH)	84	90	85	0.12%	0.12%	0.11%
Asian alone (NH)	1,082	963	822	1.60%	1.26%	1.08%
Native Hawaiian or Pacific Islander alone (NH)	27	29	7	0.04%	0.04%	0.01%
Other race alone (NH)	124	149	360	0.18%	0.19%	0.47%
Mixed race or Multiracial (NH)	1,083	1,531	2,163	1.60%	2.00%	2.84%
Hispanic or Latino (any race)	2,340	3,178	4,612	3.46%	4.14%	6.06%
Total	67,623	76,727	76,138	100.00%	100.00%	100.00%

Historical population
Census	Pop.	Note	%±
2000	67,816		—
2010	76,727		13.1%
2020	76,138		−0.8%

As of the 2020 census there were 76,138 people, 29,269 households, and 17,852 families residing in the township. The population density was 2,083.80 inhabitants per square mile (804.56/km^{2}). There were 31,802 housing units at an average density of 870.38 per square mile (336.06/km^{2}). The racial makeup of the township was 74.17% African American, 16.69% White, 0.24% Native American, 1.11% Asian, 0.02% Pacific Islander, 2.90% from other races, and 4.89% from two or more races. Hispanic or Latino of any race were 6.06% of the population.

There were 29,269 households, out of which 27.20% had children under the age of 18 living with them, 40.13% were married couples living together, 16.68% had a female householder with no spouse present, and 39.01% were non-families. 36.00% of all households were made up of individuals, and 17.70% had someone living alone who was 65 years of age or older. The average household size was 2.56 and the average family size was 3.43.

The township's age distribution consisted of 22.4% under the age of 18, 9.0% from 18 to 24, 22.1% from 25 to 44, 29.2% from 45 to 64, and 17.3% who were 65 years of age or older. The median age was 42.3 years. For every 100 females, there were 88.0 males. For every 100 females age 18 and over, there were 80.1 males.

The median income for a household in the township was $73,483, and the median income for a family was $91,173. Males had a median income of $56,635 versus $43,458 for females. The per capita income for the township was $36,119. About 6.6% of families and 11.4% of the population were below the poverty line, including 12.1% of those under age 18 and 11.3% of those age 65 or over.

== Political districts ==
- Illinois's 2nd congressional district
- State House District 37
- State House District 38
- State House District 80
- State Senate District 19
- State Senate District 40

== Education ==
- Rich Township High School
- Southland College Preparatory Charter High School
- Homewood-Flossmoor High School
- Elementary School District 159
- Country Club Hills School District 160
- Flossmoor School District 161
- Matteson School District 162
- Park Forest School District 163
