= Debbie Meyers-Martin =

American politician

Member of the Illinois House of Representatives from the 38th district
- Incumbent
- Assumed office January 9, 2019
- Preceded by: Al Riley

Mayor of Olympia Fields, Illinois
- In office December 2010 – May 2017
- Preceded by: Linzey Jones
- Succeeded by: Sterling M. Burke

Personal details
- Party: Democratic
- Education: University of Illinois (BA)
- Profession: Community Affairs Specialist

Debbie Meyers-Martin is a Democratic member of the Illinois House of Representatives for the 38th district. The district, located in the Chicago metropolitan area, includes all or parts of Country Club Hills, Flossmoor, Frankfort, Hazel Crest, Harvey, Homewood, Markham, Mokena, Oak Forest, Olympia Fields, Park Forest, Richton Park, Tinley Park.

Meyers-Martin won a four-way Democratic primary with a commanding 48% of the vote and ran unopposed in the 2018 general election. She previously served as the first African-American female mayor of Olympia Fields from December 2010 until May 2017. succeeding Linzie Jones (mayor from 1996 to 2010), the first African-American mayor of the city.

Meyers-Martin earned a bachelor of arts in criminal justice and pre-law from the University of Illinois at Chicago.

As of July 3, 2022, Representative Meyers-Martin is a member of the following Illinois House committees:

- Appropriations - General Services Committee (HAPG)
- Appropriations - Higher Education Committee (HAPI)
- Cities & Villages Committee (HCIV)
- Economic Opportunity & Equity Committee (HECO)
- Transportation: Regulation, Roads & Bridges Committee (HTRR)

== Electoral history ==
Illinois 38th State House District Democratic Primary, 2018
Party	Candidate	Votes	%
Democratic	Debbie Meyers-Martin	7,974	44.83
Democratic	David Bonner	4,685	26.34
Democratic	Max Solomon	3,177	17.86
Democratic	Cecil Matthews Jr	1,953	10.98
Total votes		17,789	100.0

Illinois 38th State House District General Election, 2018
Party	Candidate	Votes	%
Democratic	Debbie Meyers-Martin	35,832	100.0
Total votes		35,832	100.0

Illinois 38th State House District General Election, 2020
Party	Candidate	Votes	%
Democratic	Debbie Meyers-Martin	41,305	77.47
Republican	Max Solomon	12,010	22.53
Total votes		53,315	100.0

Illinois 38th State House District General Election, 2022
Party	Candidate	Votes	%
Democratic	Debbie Meyers-Martin	27,135	70.73
Republican	Tom Toolis	11,229	29.27
Total votes		25,560	100.0
