= Rich East High School =

Location
- 300 Sauk Trail; Park Forest, Illinois 60466; United States; 41.4809°N 87.6905°W

Information
- School type: public secondary
- Motto: Leadership, Scholarship, Sportsmanship
- Opened: 1952
- Closed: 2020
- School district: Rich Township HS #227
- Superintendent: Dr. Johnnie Thomas
- Principal: Dr. Albert Brass, Jr.
- Staff: 71.69 (FTE)
- Grades: 9–12
- Gender: coed
- Enrollment: 913 (2017–18)
- Average class size: 13.5
- Student to teacher ratio: 12.74
- Colors: green yellow
- Athletics conference: South Suburban Conference
- Team name: Rockets
- Accreditation: North Central Association of Colleges and Schools
- Newspaper: The Reveiller
- Yearbook: Lagoon
- Website: http://www.richeast.org

Rich East High School or REHS was a public four-year high school located in Park Forest, Illinois, a southern suburb of Chicago in the United States. Rich East's campus serves the cities of Park Forest, Matteson, Olympia Fields, Chicago Heights and Richton Park serving sections of school districts 162 and 163. Oscar W. Huth Middle School, Illinois Elementary School, Barack Obama School of Leadership and STEM and Michelle Obama School of Technology and the Arts served as feeder schools. It is a part of Rich Township District 227, which also includes Rich South High School and Rich Central High School. As of October 16, 2019, District 227 has decided to close the school.

Until its closure it was the oldest of the three district high schools.

== History ==
Rich East High school was the first of its district to open in 1952, but was originally called Rich Township High school. This was the school's name until the construction of Rich Central High School in 1961 and Rich South High School in 1972, which now make up the three schools of District 227. Rich East was originally held in the Faith United Protestant Church until Park Forest gave them the open land to build the school. The land was only open and given to them for free by the villagers of Park Forest because it was mostly composed of clay, which is not suitable to build upon.

Many old students remember that for many years, cement had to be pumped underneath the school's main gym so that it would not sink.
The Media Center, in the front of the building was also built on unstable ground and after several days of rain, water would rise up into the carpet, making it difficult to breathe. The head librarian would scramble to save books.

There is a lagoon on the campus. In nice weather, students would sit around it during lunch times. In the winter, if it froze enough, the surface would be smoothed and people would ice skate on it. The school yearbook was named The Lagoon after it.

In the 1970s, the school newspaper, The Reveillier, won numerous journalism awards for the quality of its writing. Some in the school administration and on the school board tried unsuccessfully to censor and put other limits on the paper, but those efforts were largely unsuccessful.
Another notable fact about Rich East was that it had a working, student-run radio station in the 1970s, very progressive for high schools at the time. The station's call letters were WRHS and operated on FM frequency 88.1.

On Oct. 15, 2019, Rich Township High School District 227 board members approved by a 4-3 vote a measure to consolidate the school district. In doing so, Rich East High School shut its doors in 2020. The two other township high schools, Rich Central and Rich South, will be retained. Board members cited declining enrollment numbers and aging facilities in need of millions in repairs as reasons for the move.

== Activities ==
The activities included at Rich East are band, computer arts, chorus, dance, photography, ceramics/sculpture, drawing/painting, theater/drama, yearbook, debate, science and technology and student council/government.

== Student resources ==
Students with learning disabilities have the option of being in a self-contained room with other students with learning disabilities or they can be completely included in the general education classroom. Students who are English-learners also have two options. They may group together in one self-contained class all day, or they can be pulled out of the classroom as a group for only part of the day. Other student resources are the school nurses, guidance counselors, peer counselors, psychologists, tutors, the media center and the technology center.

== Notable alumni ==
- Jon Asamoah (Class of 2006), is an offensive lineman in the NFL
- Tom Berenger (Class of 1967) is an Oscar–nominated actor, best known for his work in films (Platoon, Major League, The Big Chill)
- Craig Hodges (Class of 1978) is a former NBA guard (1982–92) and collegiate coach who won two NBA Championships with the Chicago Bulls
- Tony Lombardi (Class of 1980), football player and coach
- Chuck Martin (Class of 1986) is head football coach at Miami (Ohio) University
- Larry McCarren is a former All-Pro NFL center (1973–84), playing his entire career with the Green Bay Packers; later radio sportscaster for the Packers
- Berry Oakley, original bassist for the Allman Brothers Band
- Bruce Pavitt (Class of 1977), cofounder of independent record label Sub Pop
- Tom Spahn is a composer, an Emmy Award winner and Grammy Award nominee
- Pete Stanicek is a former MLB player and brother of Steve Stanicek (Baltimore Orioles)
- Steve Stanicek is a former MLB player (Milwaukee Brewers, Philadelphia Phillies)
- Kim Thayil (Class of 1978) is a guitarist and founding member of the rock band Soundgarden
- Dawn Upshaw (Class of 1978) is a multi–Grammy Award winning soprano
- Tom Wieghaus is a former MLB player (Montreal Expos, Houston Astros)
- Hiro Yamamoto (Class of 1979) is a founding member of and original bassist for the rock band Soundgarden
- Ryan Yarborough (Class of 1989) is a former NFL wide receiver (1994–98)
- Walter Young is a wide receiver who played for Illinois and the Pittsburgh Steelers

== Notable staff ==
- Steve Fisher, head basketball coach of the San Diego State University men's basketball team, was the school's head boys basketball coach (1971–79). He later coached at the college level, which included leading the University of Michigan to the 1989 NCAA Men's Division I Basketball Championship.
- Craig Hodges was an assistant basketball coach with the school.
- Gene Smithson, former Rich East coach, later became head men's basketball coach for Illinois State, where his record was 66-18, and for Wichita State, where his teams went 155-81.
