= Park Forest =

Park Forest may refer to:

- Park Forest, Illinois
- Park Forest (meteorite)
- Park Forest Village, Pennsylvania
- Park Forest, Dallas, Texas
- Park Forest Plaza

== See also ==
- Forest Park (disambiguation)
