= Forest Park =

Forest Park may refer to:

- A type of park, see forest park

== Towns and villages ==
- Forest Park, Ontario, Canada
- Forest Park, Georgia, US
- Forest Park, Illinois, US
- Forest Park, Indiana, US
- Forest Park, Ohio, Hamilton County, US
- Forest Park, Ottawa County, Ohio, US
- Forest Park, Oklahoma, US
- Forest Park, Bracknell Forest, Berkshire, UK

== Parks ==
- Ards Forest Park, County Donegal, Ireland
- Arkona Forest Park, Szczecin, Poland
- Forest Park Nature Center, Peoria, Illinois, US
- Forest Park (Springfield, Massachusetts), US, designed by Frederick Law Olmsted
- Forest Park (St. Louis, Missouri), US
- Forest Park (Ballston Lake, New York), US
- Forest Park (Queens, New York), US
- Forest Park (Portland, Oregon), US
- Forest Park, a park in Everett, Washington, US
- Gongqing Forest Park, Shanghai, China
- Lavizan Forest Park, Tehran, Iran
- Mścięcino Forest Park, West Pomeranian Voivodeship, Poland
- Forest parks of New Zealand
- Forest parks of Scotland

== Neighborhoods ==
- Forest Park, Baltimore, Maryland, US
- Forest Park, Columbus, Ohio, US
- Forest Park, Springfield, Massachusetts, US
- Forest Park, Detroit, Michigan, US

== Public schools ==
- Forest Park High School (Indiana), Ferdinand, Indiana, US
- Forest Park High School (Maryland), Baltimore, Maryland, US
- Forest Park High School (Virginia), Prince William County, Virginia, US

== Other uses ==
- Forest Park, Chalfont, amusement park in Pennsylvania
- Forest Park Cemetery, Brunswick, New York, US
- Forest Park Country Club, Adams, Massachusetts, US
- List of Forest Parks of Thailand, a protected area category in Thailand

== See also ==
- Park Forest (disambiguation)
- Urban forest
- Urban park
