= Matteson School District =

Matteson School District can refer to:

- Elementary School District 159 (also known as Matteson School District 159)
- Matteson School District 162
