= Rich South High School =

Rich Township High School Fine Arts & Communications Campus

Location
- 5000 Sauk Trail 60471; Richton Park, Illinois; United States; 41.48566°N 87.73706°W

Information
- Type: Public secondary
- Opened: 1972
- Superintendent: Johnnie Thomas
- Principal: Larry Varn
- Faculty: 72.00 (FTE)
- Grades: 9–12
- Enrollment: 954
- Student to teacher ratio: 18.1
- Team name: Stars
- Feeder schools: Colin Powell Middle School O.W Huth Middle School
- Website: School website

Rich Township High School Fine Arts Campus, formerly known as, Rich South High School (RSHS) is a public four-year high school located in Richton Park, Illinois, a southern suburb of Chicago, in the United States. Rich Township's campus serves the cities of Matteson, Park Forest, Richton Park, Olympia Fields and University Park. It is a part of Rich Township District 227.

== Renovations ==
A new auditorium was completed for the 2006–2007 school year.

A new cafeteria was completed for the 2008–2009 school year. This renovation included converting the old cafeteria into a new media center, and converting the old media center into additional classroom space.

== Notable alumni ==
- Nina Chanel Abney, American Artist
- Dreezy, Rapper
- Greg Lewis, NFL player
- Mikey Rocks, Rapper
- Mark Spitznagel, Hedge Fund Manager
