= Metropolitan Library System =

Coordinates: 41°50′N 88°0′W

- Location: Burr Ridge, IL
- Established: 1966

Collection
- Size: ?

Access and use
- Population served: ?

Other information
- Budget: $?
- Director: Susan Bochenski
- Employees: ?
- Website: http://www.mls.lib.il.us/

The Metropolitan Library System (MLS) was an association of academic, public, school, and special libraries in Chicago and its suburbs in Cook, DuPage and Will counties. On July 1, 2011, Metropolitan Library System merged with Alliance Library System, DuPage Library System, North Suburban Library System, and Prairie Area Library System to form the Reaching Across Illinois Library System. Sarah Ann Long, director of the North Suburban Library System, summarized the evolution of organizations in northern Illinois in a 2011 essay,"Context is Everything."

== SWAN ==
SWAN (System Wide Automated Network) maintains a shared online catalog for its 80 members.

== Member Libraries ==
- Grande Prairie Public Library
- Orland Park Public Library
- Richton Park Public Library District
- River Forest Public Library
