= Matteson School District 162 =

School district in Illinois, United States

Address
- 4601 Sauk Trail Richton Park, Illinois, 60471; United States

District information
- Type: Public
- Grades: PreK–8
- Superintendent: Blondean Davis
- NCES District ID: 1725020

Students and staff
- Students: 2,409

Other information
- Website: www.sd162.org

Matteson School District 162 is a suburban school district in Illinois, based in Richton Park. The district enrolls nearly 2,400 students, serving portions of Matteson, Richton Park, Olympia Fields, Park Forest and a small section of University Park. As of 2017 it has 2,100 students.

The district is currently headquartered in Richton Park, it was previously headquartered in Matteson.

== Schools ==
Middle School

- O.W. Huth Middle School (Matteson)

Elementary Schools

- Arcadia Elementary School (Olympia Fields)
- Illinois Elementary School (Park Forest)
- Indiana Elementary School (Park Forest)
- Richton Square School (Richton Park)
- Sauk Elementary School (Richton Park)
- Matteson Elementary School (Matteson)

Former schools:

- Illinois Primary Center (Park Forest)

== See also ==
- Southland College Preparatory Charter High School - Charter school in the district boundaries that share facilities with but not operated directly by the district
