= Park Forest Plaza =

- Location: Park Forest, Illinois, United States
- Coordinates: 41°29′0″N 87°40′46″W
- Opened: 1949
- Closed: 1996
- Developer: Philip Klutznick
- Owner: Village of Park Forest
- Public transit: Pace

Park Forest Plaza was a shopping center located in the planned community of Park Forest, Illinois, United States, that opened in 1949. The center was developed by Philip M. Klutznick (1907–1999), who was also a prominent leader in the national Jewish community and later served as U.S. Secretary of Commerce under 39th President Jimmy Carter. The architects were Loebl, Schlossman and Bennett.

Park Forest Plaza was one of the first major regional shopping centers in the United States of the post-World War II era and it served as the downtown to the adjacent village. Klutznick followed many of same principles and concepts in architecture, land use and design espoused by nationally famous developer James W. Rouse (1914–1996) of Baltimore. The distinctive clock tower in the open courtyard became the symbol of both the shopping center and the village. The grass and tree-lined courtyard gave the center an airy attractiveness which was popular much of the year. The plaza was anchored by a Marshall Field's, Sears, and Goldblatt's department stores

Competition from a new larger indoor mall in nearby Matteson, Illinois, three decades later in the early 1970s ultimately doomed Park Forest Plaza. The center subsequently survived until 1996 when Field's closed and Sears moved to the nearby Lincoln Mall.

The village has now converted what was left to a "regular" downtown area with local services, including retail stores, a banquet hall, a cultural arts center, a dance studio, a movie theater, a senior residential community and the Village Hall. Single-family homes are also being built on the outskirts of the downtown area.

== See also ==
- Illinois Theatre Center
