= Beth Mueller =

American librarian (1934–2021)

Elizabeth Mueller
- Born: November 7, 1934; LaGrange, Illinois, U.S.
- Died: May 24, 2021 (aged 86); Boone, North Carolina, U.S.

Elizabeth (Beth) Mueller (November 7, 1934 -- May 24, 2021) was a librarian in the greater Chicago area who consulted with various suburban municipalities to build their public libraries. She helped found the Justice Public Library and the Indian Prairie Library, among others. She later became the Director of the Appalachian Regional Library in North Carolina, where she oversaw funding for the 2005 expansion of the Public Library in Boone, NC.

== Career ==
Mueller was employed by the Suburban Library System as a Consulting Services Director. The Suburban Library System merged with the Metropolitan Library System in 2004. Many of her projects were funded by Project Plus, an Illinois mechanism for using federal funds from the Library Services and Construction Act. This project allowed communities without libraries to receive funds for preliminary services - such as a bookmobile or study room - before breaking ground on a library, if the community filing a funding referendum. In her role as a consultant, Mueller informed the public about Project Plus and discussed program eligibility requirements with prospective communities. She was also responsible for arranging preliminary services and developing local fundraising strategies, including lobbying for referendum proposals.

== Honors ==
Mueller was 1993 Illinois Librarian of the Year.

Mueller was mentioned in the congressional record of the United States for her work on the Justice, IL, Public Library. She was named “among those most instrumental in the creation of this library district."
