= Rich Central High School =

Rich Township High School STEM Campus

Location
- 3600 West 203rd Street; Olympia Fields, Illinois; USA; 41.5225°N 87.7054°W

Information
- Type: Public secondary
- Established: 1961 (9–10); 1963 (9–12)
- Superintendent: Dr. Johnnie Thomas
- Principal: Dr. LeViis Haney
- Faculty: 70.10 (FTE)
- Grades: 9–12
- Enrollment: 1,045 (2017–18)
- Student to teacher ratio: 14.91
- Colors: Red; Columbia Blue
- Athletics conference: South Suburban Conference
- Team name: Olympians/Lady Olympians
- Newspaper: The Torch
- Yearbook: The Oracle
- Website: www.rich227.org

Rich Township High School STEM Campus, formerly Rich Central High School, is a public four-year high school in the south suburbs of Chicago, located in Olympia Fields, Illinois. The Campus serves portions of Chicago Heights, Country Club Hills, Matteson, Olympia Fields, Park Forest, Richton Park, and Tinley Park. The school serves sections of elementary school districts 162, 161, 160, and 159. It is a part of Rich Township District 227, along with Rich Township Fine Arts Campus.

== History ==
Rich Township High School District #227 serves the residents of Country Club Hills, Matteson, parts of Olympia Fields, Park Forest, Richton Park, a small section of Chicago Heights, and adjoining rural areas in South Cook County. The district was formed from non-high-school territory in 1949. Construction of the East Campus of Rich Township High School, financed by a $1,600,000 bond issue, began in September 1952.

Twelve months later, it was operating as a four-year high school. During the 1952–53 school year, a ninth-grade school was operating in the Faith United Protestant Church in Park Forest. Located on a 55-acre (220,000 m^{2}) site donated by American Community Builders, Inc., the original building accommodated approximately 750 students. In 1955, a $450,000 bond issue financed the addition of 12 classrooms and a gymnasium.

This increased the capacity of the school to approximately 1,100 students. In 1957, a $1,050,000 bond issue was passed and the money used to increase the size of the East Campus to accommodate 1,500 to 1,600 students. At the same time, 50 acres (200,000 m^{2}) of land for a new high school site was purchased in Olympia Fields.

In 1959, a $1,690,000 bond issue was passed to finance building of the initial stage of a new Central Campus in Olympia Fields. The first stage provided facilities for about 700 students. The building has been recognized as one of the "significant schools of the future" in a monograph published by the Ford Foundation. In its July 1960 issue, The Nation's Schools carried a cover picture and a ten-page article on the new school under the title, "An Image of the Future in Olympia Fields, IL."

In 1960, a bond issue of $225,000 was approved to equip the new school which opened to approximately 425 students in the ninth and tenth grades in September 1961. At the same time, the East Campus enrolled about 1,600 students. In 1962, a $1,250,000 bond issue was authorized by voters in the district to build and equip an addition to the Central Campus facility bringing its capacity to 1,500 students. This addition was completed for the opening of school in September 1963.

In 1966, a $2,700,000 bond issue was authorized by voters in the district. $2,500,000 of the bond issue was for building and equipping additions to the Central and East Campus facilities. That brought the capacity of the Central Campus to 2,100 students and the East Campus to 1,800 students. $200,000 was used to purchase land for a third high school.

== Athletics ==
Rich Central High School has 21 athletic teams – 10 boys' and 11 girls' teams – which play in the Southland Athletic Conference and the Illinois High School Association. Its mascots are the GORCs and Lady Olympians. Below is a list of sports through the Illinois High School Association:

- Marching band
- Girls volleyball
- Boys soccer
- Golf
- Football
- Girls tennis
- Cross country
- Boys basketball
- Girls basketball
- Boys wrestling
- Girls gymnastics
- Girls soccer
- Girls softball
- Girls bowling
- Boys track and field
- Girls track and field
- Scholastic Bowl
- Cheerleading
- Music-Instrumental
- Drama

=== IHSA state titles ===
State titles
Sport	Year
Boys wrestling	1973–74
Girls volleyball	1976–77
Girls bowling	1979–80
Girls bowling	1982–83
Girls bowling	1983–84
Girls gymnastics	1989–90
Co-Ed cheerleading	2011–2012
Total	7

== Activities ==
The Rich Central High School Band has won several titles in past years. The band took first place at the 2006 Cotton Bowl Classic, 2006 Bud Billiken Parade and the All Star Music Festival in Orlando, Florida. The band has distinguished themselves with over 40 superior ratings in the IHSA Solo and Ensemble Festival.

Rich Central High School band has received invitations to the 2007-2008 FedEx Orange Bowl in Miami, Florida; the 2008 Cotton Bowl Classic in Dallas, Texas; and the 2008 Chick-fil-A Bowl in Atlanta, Georgia. In modern times they have won The Chicago Football Classic 2014 as well as the Bud Billiken Day Parade located in Chicago, Illinois

== Notable alumni ==
- Kendall Gill, retired guard of the National Basketball Association
- Jason Johnson, NFL linebacker for the Dallas Cowboys, played college football for the Eastern Illinois Panthers and the UCF Knights
- Julie Plec, television producer and director
- J. Ivy, Grammy Award-winning poet
- Lisa Subeck, Wisconsin state legislator
- Larry Taylor, Brazilian National basketball player
- Drew Sidora, actress
- Dee Dee Davis, child actress
- Chuck Greenberg, musician for Shadowfax
- Changjoon Justin Lee, neuroscientist specializing in glioscience
