= Seph =

Seph is a given name. Notable people with the name include:

- Seph Lawless, American photographer
- Seph Schlueter (born 1999), American musician
