= Park Forest-Chicago Heights School District 163 =

School district near Chicago, Illinois

Address
- 242 S Orchard Dr Park Forest, Illinois, 60466; United States

District information
- Type: Public
- Grades: PreK–8
- NCES District ID: 1730810

Students and staff
- Students: 1,494

Park Forest-Chicago Heights School District 163 (SD163) is a school district headquartered in Park Forest, Illinois. It serves sections of Chicago Heights.

== History ==
In 2016 the district had over 2,000 students. In 2019 the district had 1,838 students.

In 2019 a board member resigned but then remained on the school board, and there was a political controversy over the board's internal management. In response to a board member using an SD163-issued charge card to pay for $5,000 of expenses, the board passed a policy regulating the cards.

== Curriculum ==
In 2019 SD163 and Chicago Arts Partnership in Education secured a $2.3 million grant to add arts education to the curriculum.

== Schools ==
SD163 decided to have its upper schools focus on particular concepts.

Grades 6-8

- Michelle Obama School of Technology and the Arts
  - In 2016 the school received its current gymnasium with stage, eight additional classrooms, and a multipurpose room. Co-principal Cheryl L. Muench stated that Michelle Obama School had a "relaxed atmosphere".

Grades 4-5

- Barack Obama School of Leadership and STEM

Grades Kindergarten to 3

- 21st Century Primary Center
- Blackhawk Primary Center
- Mohawk Primary Center

Preschool

- Algonquin Pre-Kindergarten Center
