= Southland College Preparatory Charter High School =

Location
- 4601 Sauk Trail; Richton Park, IL 60471; United States
- Coordinates: 41.484°N 87.728°W

Information
- Type: Comprehensive Public High School, Charter
- Established: August 19, 2010
- Superintendent: Dr. Blondean Y. Davis
- Principal: Dr. Corey Levy
- Grades: 9–12
- Enrollment: 500
- Campus type: Suburban
- Color: Maroon White
- Team name: Eagles

The Southland College Preparatory Charter High School (SCPHS; also known as Southland College Prep, Southland College Prep High School, or simply Southland) is a College Preparatory Charter High School in Richton Park, Illinois. The school serves the communities of Richton Park, Country Club Hills, Matteson, Olympia Fields, and Park Forest.

== History ==
Southland College Preparatory Charter High School was formed in 2010 by Dr. Blondean Y. Davis as an alternative for students of Rich Township High School District 227. Beginning with fewer than 125 students, the school has its origins in O.W. Huth Middle School. By April, 2011 the freshman inaugural class had moved into the newly renovated school and district office. Previously a Prudential Insurance calling center, the purchase and renovation of the building totaled more than $10 million. Despite several attempts by District 227 officials to close the charter school and appeals made to the Illinois Court of Appeals, the charter school has remained open.

== Student Programs ==
Southland College Prep competes in Illinois High School Association (IHSA) competitions. The school has a Speech team, which has placed at state finals, and a Dramatic Duet Acting championship in 2013. The speech team also went on to place first at the IHSA state tournament in 2017 and 2018. The Southland band program has amassed four IHSA Division I Superior Performance titles. In 2014, Southland was in the IHSA Individual Boys Bowling Final competition. In 2017, the Speech team won state in Group Interpretation for their performance of the movie Hidden Figures.
