= Rich Township High School =

School district in Illinois, United States

Location
- 20550 S Cicero Avenue; Matteson, Illinois 60443; United States

Information
- School type: public secondary
- Opened: 1952
- School district: Rich Township High School District 227
- Superintendent: Dr. Johnnie Thomas
- Principal: Co-Principals (Mr. Lynn Fields - FAC Campus) & (Ms. LaTricia Varnado - STEM Campus)
- Staff: 247
- Grades: 9–12
- Gender: coed
- Enrollment: 2,433 (2024-2025)
- Area: South Suburbs
- Campus type: suburban
- Colors: red black
- Athletics conference: Southland Athletic Conference
- Mascot: Raptors
- Team name: Raptors
- Website: https://www.rich227.org/

Rich Township High School is a public four-year high school located in the south suburbs of Chicago. It operates two campuses: one in Richton Park, Illinois, and one in Olympia Fields, Illinois.

The district enrolls nearly 2,500 students from all or portions of Chicago Heights, Country Club Hills, Olympia Fields, Matteson, Richton Park, Park Forest, Tinley Park, and University Park.

== History ==
Rich East High School opened in 1952, becoming the first school in the district and located in Park Forest. The second school, Rich Central High School (now known as Rich township STEM Campus) opened in Olympia Fields in 1959. Rich South High School's campus operated out of the Rich East Campus beginning in late 1972, with a separate Rich South Campus opening in Richton Park in January 1973. In 2019, the district announced that the Rich East campus would be closed going into the 2020–2021 school year.

== Future Plans ==
As of December 2019, the Rich Township district plans include consolidation of the remaining two schools, Rich South and Rich Central. Other plans include renovations of the remaining schools. The renovation plan would involve more than 100 million dollars.

== Demographics ==
The racial or ethnic makeup of the school was 84.1% Black, 11.3% Hispanic, 3.1% Multiracial, 1.3% White, 0.1% Asian, and 0.1% American Indian.

== Athletics ==
Rich Township High School competes in the Southland Athletic Conference, and is a member of the Illinois High School Association.

Fall	Winter	Spring
Football	Boys Basketball	Baseball
Boys Cross Country	Girls Basketball	Softball
Boys Soccer	Boys Wrestling	Boys Tennis
Girls Cross Country	Girls Wrestling	Boys Track
Girls Flag Football	Boys Bowling	Girls Track
Girls Tennis	Girls Bowling	Girls Soccer
Girls Volleyball	Competitive Cheerleading	Boys Volleyball
Girls Golf	Competitive Dance	
Boys Golf		

== Schools ==
According to the district, as of 2019 these campuses are considered to be one school.

Fine Arts Campus - formerly known as Rich South - * Rich South High School (Richton Park)

STEM Campus - formerly known as Rich Central - * Rich Central High School (Olympia Fields)

Rich East was closed in 2021. Now, Rich East students attend either the FAC or STEM Campus.

- Rich East High School (Park Forest)
