= Lincoln Mall =

Defunct shopping mall in Matteson, Illinois

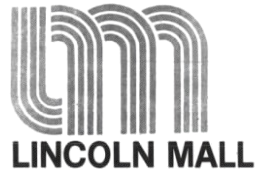
- Lincoln Mall logo 1973
- Location: Matteson, Illinois, United States
- Coordinates: 41°30′8″N 87°43′41″W
- Opened: August 9, 1973; 53 years ago
- Closed: January 7, 2015; 11 years ago (mall interior); March 4, 2018; 8 years ago (final tenant Carson Pirie Scott)
- Developer: Randhurst Corp.
- Manager: Freehold Management
- Owner: Freehold Management
- Architect: Victor Gruen
- Num. of stores: All vacant
- Num. of anchor tenants: 0 (JCPenney is now a standalone building)
- Floor area: ~225,000 sq ft (20,900 m^{2})
- Floors: 2
- Public transit: Pace

Lincoln Mall was a shopping mall located at the corner of U.S. Route 30 and Cicero Avenue in Matteson, Illinois, a south suburb of Chicago.

== History ==
Lincoln Mall opened on August 9, 1973 with anchors Carson Pirie Scott, Montgomery Ward, Wieboldt's, and JCPenney. The center was developed by the Randhurst Corporation, the same developer consisting of Wieboldt's and Carson's executives who developed Randhurst Mall and Lakehurst Mall. Wieboldt's closed in 1987.

In 1991, Walmart and Sam's Club opened across the street from the mall. Walmart moved to Olympia Fields in 2016, while Sam's Club officially closed on January 26, 2018. A year later in 1992, Best Buy opened in the surrounding area of the mall; the store closed in 2012. The mall underwent a renovation in 1993 which included a new glass elevator. In 1995, Sears opened in the former Wieboldt's location. Montgomery Ward closed their store in 1999 and went bankrupt soon after. In 2000, JCPenney closed their location in Lincoln Mall. Due to the loss of two anchors, mall traffic declined and many stores began to vacate.

A $115-million redevelopment process started in 2006 with hopes of attracting more retailers. This plan included a multi-screen cinema and a four-lane road to connect Cicero Avenue and Lincoln Highway. It included the demolition of existing outparcels and the section where Montgomery Ward and JCPenney had been. In July 2007, Target opened with a 126,000-square-foot (11,700 m^{2}) store built on an outparcel, and JCPenney returned in October 2007 with a 104,000-square-foot (9,700 m^{2}) store, also built on an outparcel.

Sears began a store-closing sale on May 11, 2012. On June 1, 2012, Lincoln Mall was scheduled for a court ordered sale by auction.

In August 2013, representatives of Matteson attempted to sue the mall owners and order that the mall be closed, due to safety and building code violations including exposed electrical wiring, an inoperative sprinkler system, blocked fire exits, a crumbling roof, and a damaged foundation.

On November 11, 2014, Cook County Judge Thomas Condon ordered that the mall be closed permanently as of January 7, 2015, with the exception of Carson's (whose building is owned separately by its parent company), which was to remain open. Operating funds that owner Michael Kohan initially provided for the mall's upkeep had been depleted and nothing remained to keep the mall operating after December. Kohan provided a court-appointed receiver with only $100,000 in the preceding 15 months to pay for repairs, maintenance, and staffing, while the number of remaining tenants' rent was insufficient to sustain daily operations. The mall would have needed to replace several exits and repair electrical and air conditioning systems in order to be brought up to code.

In late 2016, photos of the abandoned mall surfaced, as part of a photo project by photographer Seph Lawless.

In February 2017, a Cook County Circuit Judge ordered immediate demolition of the mall. On March 17, 2017, news outlets reported the Village of Matteson had agreed with the court-appointed receiver on final demolition costs, with demolition projected to begin shortly after it received the judge's approval. Demolition began May 8, 2017. Demolition was completed by the end of summer 2017.

On November 7, 2017, it was announced that Target would be closing as part of a plan to close 12 stores nationwide. The store closed in February 2018.

The mall itself, which closed in 2015, was demolished by 2018.

On March 4, 2018, Carson Pirie Scott abruptly closed its Lincoln Mall store, leaving JCPenney the only remaining tenant. In November 2019, demolition of the former Carson's building commenced. On January 30, 2020, The City of Matteson approved a casino on the mall site, proposed by South Suburban Development LLC.

On July 31, 2020, JCPenney put 21 stores up for sale (including the Lincoln Mall location) as part of their bankruptcy.
