= Lavizan Forest Park =

Forest Park in Tehran

- English: Lavizan Forest Park; Persian: پارک جنگلی لویزان
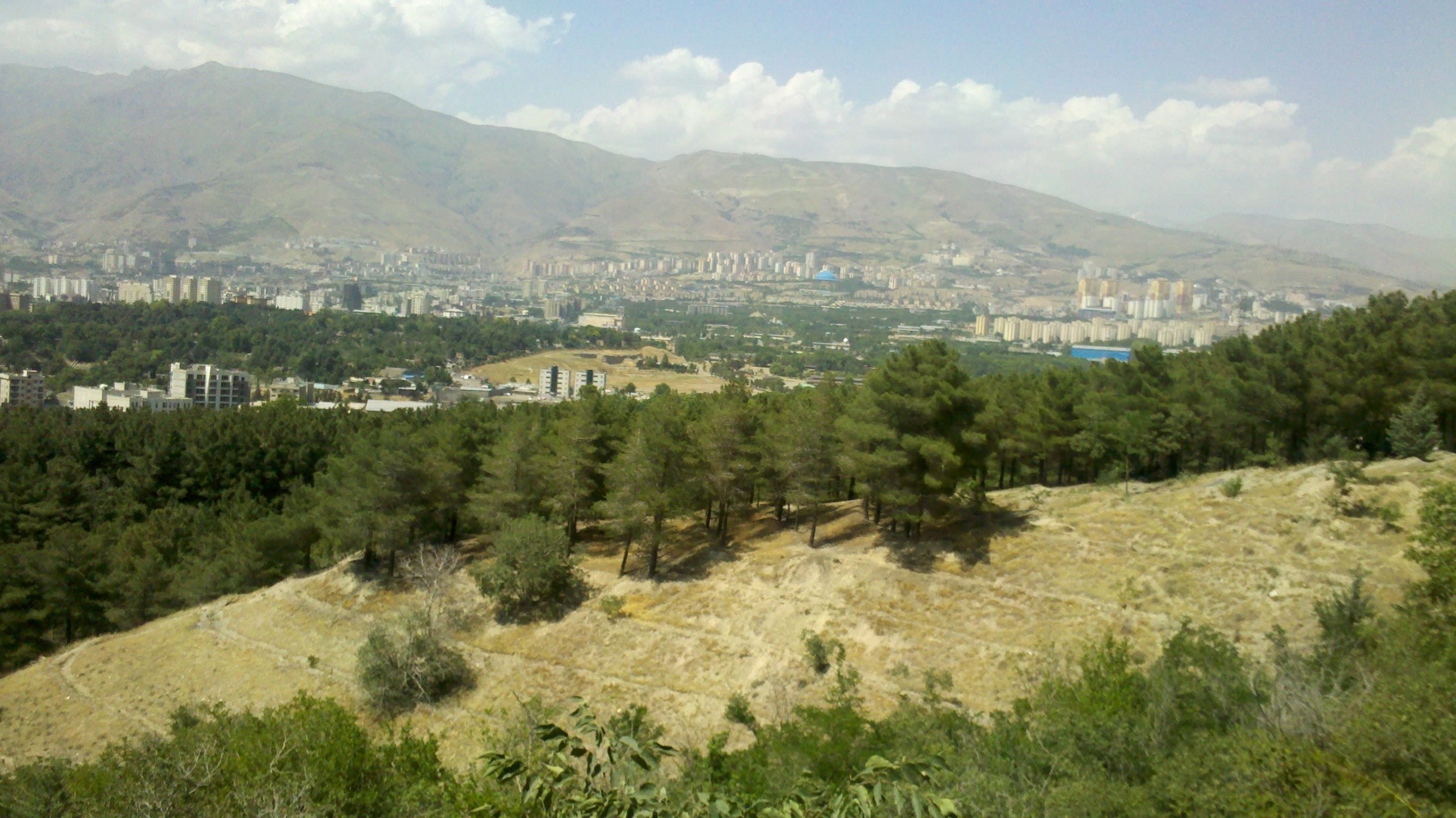
- Interactive map of Lavizan Forest Park
- Type: Forest park
- Location: Tehran Province, Iran
- Coordinates: 35°45′49.26″N 51°30′3.5″E
- Area: 1100 (ha) = 11 (km2)
- Created: 1961
- Operator: Municipality of Tehran
- Open: 9:00 AM - 6:00 PM
- Status: "Open all year."
- Terrain: Nobonyad Metro Station

Lavizan (Persian: لویزان, also romanized as Lavizān) is a forest park located in Shemiranat County in Tehran Province, Iran (North East Tehran). Lavizan Forest Park is a recreation area used by people from Lavizan and Tehran. Its area is about 1100 hectares.

== Vegetation ==
List of vegetation in Lavizan Forest Park:

- Cypress
- Platanus
- Oak
- Robinia
- Maple

== Tehran Birds Garden ==
Tehran Birds Garden is other attraction in Lavizan Forest Park.

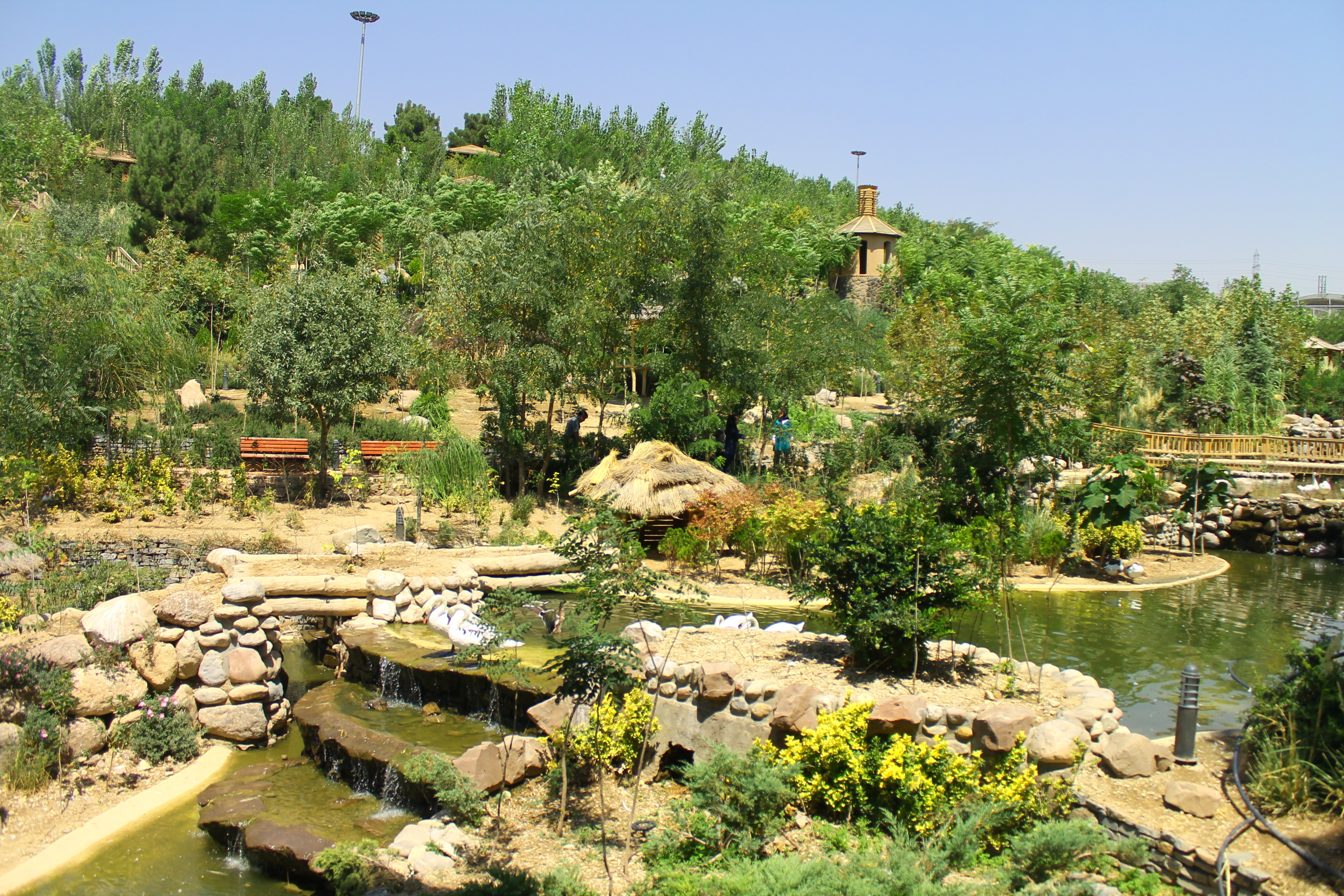
Tehran Birds Garden
