= Richton Park Public Library District =

The Richton Park Library District was founded in 1972 when village trustees rented a storefront at 22365 Governors Highway in Richton Park, Illinois.

Volunteers had to engage in extensive cleaning and renovation in order to convert the former coffee-house into a library. They constructed shelves for the books, and furniture was donated. Books were obtained through donations from area residents, the Suburban Library System, and the Illinois State Library. Fundraisers, including bake sales, book sales, and paper drives were held to secure additional funding. Upon opening, the library was staffed entirely with volunteers. In 1974, village residents approved a referendum to establish the Richton Park Public Library District.

With rapid growth of the library, village residents and staff realized that the storefront facility was inadequate. In 1979, the community agreed to lease the old village hall to the District to facilitate expansion. The new library opened on March 30, 1981 at 4045 Sauk Trail after an extensive renovation. The next few years saw tremendous growth in the population of Richton Park, and with it an increased demand for library services. In the fall of 1984, a new addition was built, offering more room for books, services, and people.

Use of the library continued to grow throughout the 1980s and 1990s. In 1995, voters approved funding to double the size of the library. With a larger building, more services were added, including new computers with Internet access.

In the spring of 2012, a referendum was passed to allow the library to build a larger facility to account for population growth. In September 2014, the Richton Park Library opened a new location that is much larger and includes significantly more space for library materials, program areas, and study rooms. This new building is located at 22310 Latonia Lane, Richton Park, IL, 60471.
