= Matteson, Illinois =

- Village
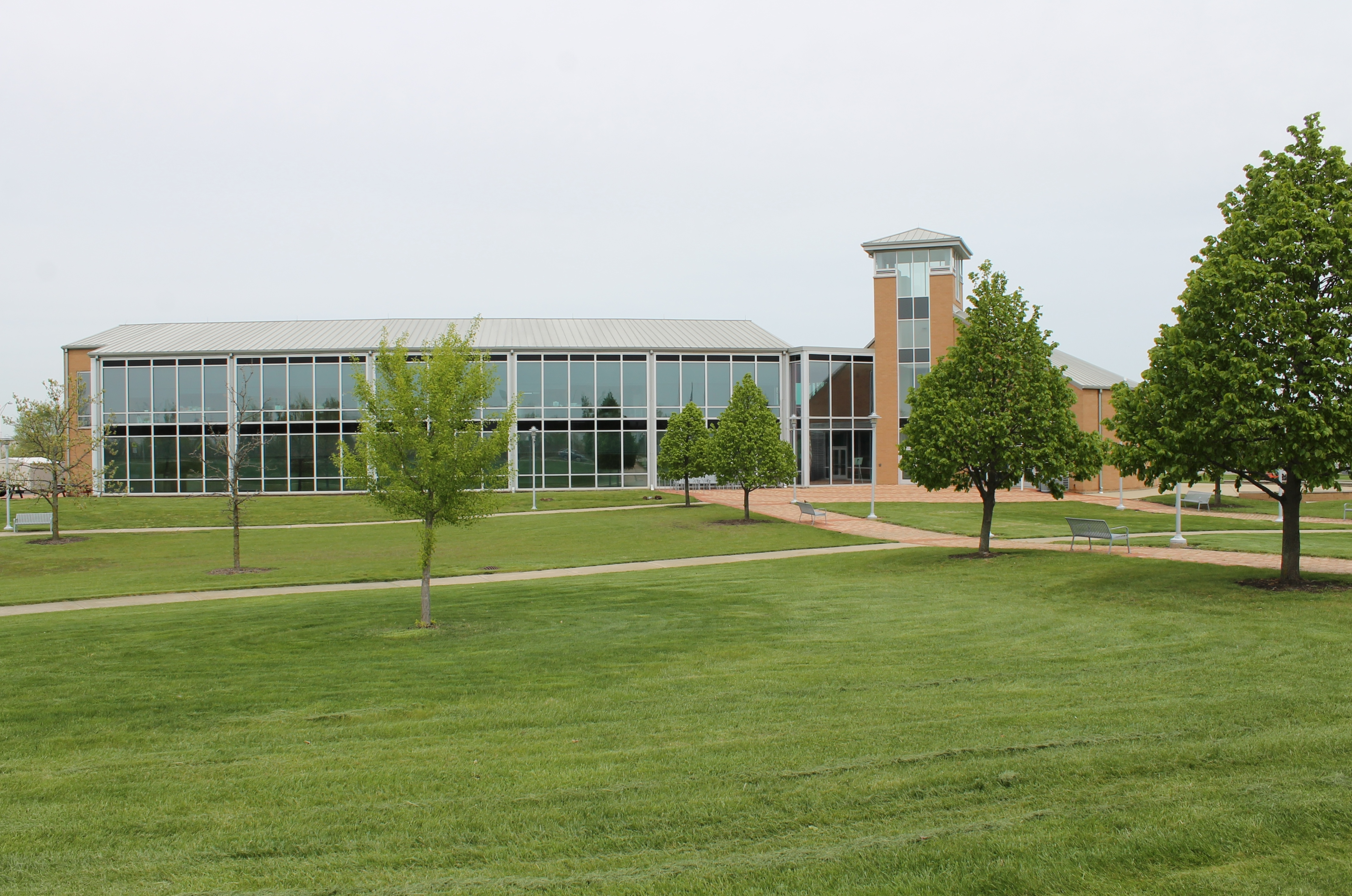
- Village Hall

- Seal
- Motto(s): "A Home for Business, A Heart for Family."
- Location within Chicago metropolitan area Location within Illinois Location within the United States
- Coordinates: 41.509832°N 87.739267°W
- Country: United States
- State: Illinois
- Counties: Cook
- Township: Rich
- Incorporated: 1889

Government
  - Village President: Sheila Y. Chalmers-Currin
  - Village Clerk: Yumeka Brown
  - Board of Trustees: Veloid Cotton Sr., Robbie Craig, Paula Farr, Jaunita Hardin, Andrè C. Satchell, Adam Shorter III and Donald Meeks

Area
  - Total: 9.32 sq mi (24.14 km^{2})
  - Land: 9.29 sq mi (24.05 km^{2})
  - Water: 0.035 sq mi (0.09 km^{2})

Population (2020)
  - Total: 19,073
  - Density: 2,054.2/sq mi (793.12/km^{2})
- Time zone: UTC-6 (CST)
  - Summer (DST): UTC-5 (CDT)
- ZIP code: 60443
- Area code: 708
- FIPS code: 17-47540
- Website: www.villageofmatteson.org

Matteson (/ˈmætɪsən/) is a village in Cook County, Illinois, United States. The population was 19,073 at the 2020 census. It is a south suburb of Chicago.

== History ==
The area encompassed by modern Matteson was settled by Europeans in the late 1800s, primarily by settlers of German descent. Platted in 1855, Matteson had nearly 500 residents when it incorporated as a village in 1889. The village's namesake is Joel Aldrich Matteson, who served as Illinois' tenth governor from 1853 to 1857. The 20th century saw improvements in plumbing, the electrification of the Illinois Central Railroad, and the construction of today's school district, resulting in significant population growth: the village's population exceeded 3,000 by the late 1960s. Lincoln Mall opened in 1973, annexing 195 acres of land for the village in the process; the mall closed in 2014 and was demolished in 2018. Present-day Matteson is home to more than 20,000 residents and hundreds of businesses. It is near Ingalls Memorial Hospital and Advocate South Suburban Hospital, two major hospitals servicing Southland Chicago.

By 1995, Black Americans made up a significant portion of Matteson's residential population. Fearing white flight, the village launched a program to encourage white Americans to move to the village. This program and the underlying racial tensions in the village attracted national attention after Dateline NBC aired an hour-long documentary about Matteson entitled "Why Can't We Live Together?" on June 27, 1997, with the story being picked up by major national and local newspapers including The New York Times, The Christian Science Monitor, The Washington Post, and The Chicago Tribune. The village's attempt at integration was not successful: between 2000 and 2010, Matteson's Black population increased by roughly 85%, while 1,200 whites left the community, primarily for overwhelmingly white tract housing developments in exurbs like Manhattan. Most of the incoming Blacks were upper-middle-class and fleeing worsening conditions in inner-city neighborhoods on Chicago's South Side. As a result, despite the efflux of white residents, average household incomes increased in several census tracts in Matteson during this time.

== Geography ==
According to the 2021 census gazetteer files, Matteson has a total area of 9.32 square miles (24.14 km^{2}), of which 9.29 square miles (24.06 km^{2}) (or 99.64%) is land and 0.03 square miles (0.08 km^{2}) (or 0.36%) is water. The village's topography is mostly flat.

Matteson is located in Chicago's Southland area. It is bordered by Park Forest and Olympia Fields to the east, Country Club Hills and Tinley Park to the north, Frankfort to the west, and Richton Park to the south.

== Demographics ==
Historical population
Census	Pop.	Note	%±
1880	451		—
1890	323		−28.4%
1900	449		39.0%
1910	461		2.7%
1920	485		5.2%
1930	736		51.8%
1940	819		11.3%
1950	1,211		47.9%
1960	3,225		166.3%
1970	4,721		46.4%
1980	10,223		116.5%
1990	11,378		11.3%
2000	12,928		13.6%
2010	19,009		47.0%
2020	19,073		0.3%
U.S. Decennial Census; 2010 2020

=== Racial and ethnic composition ===
Matteson village, Illinois – Racial and ethnic composition Note: the US Census treats Hispanic/Latino as an ethnic category. This table excludes Latinos from the racial categories and assigns them to a separate category. Hispanics/Latinos may be of any race.
Race / Ethnicity (NH = Non-Hispanic)	Pop 2000	Pop 2010	Pop 2020	% 2000	% 2010	% 2020
White alone (NH)	4,031	2,784	1,831	31.18%	14.65%	9.60%
Black or African American alone (NH)	8,033	14,833	15,641	62.14%	78.03%	82.01%
Native American or Alaska Native alone (NH)	11	13	19	0.09%	0.07%	0.10%
Asian alone (NH)	198	187	185	1.53%	0.98%	0.97%
Pacific Islander alone (NH)	0	8	2	0.00%	0.04%	0.01%
Other race alone (NH)	22	45	97	0.17%	0.24%	0.51%
Mixed race or Multiracial (NH)	197	326	495	1.52%	1.71%	2.60%
Hispanic or Latino (any race)	436	813	803	3.37%	4.28%	4.21%
Total	12,928	19,009	19,073	100.00%	100.00%	100.00%

=== 2020 census ===
As of the 2020 census, Matteson had a population of 19,073. The median age was 42.8 years. 21.3% of residents were under the age of 18 and 18.4% were 65 years of age or older. For every 100 females there were 82.4 males, and for every 100 females age 18 and over there were 76.7 males age 18 and over.

100.0% of residents lived in urban areas, while 0.0% lived in rural areas.

There were 7,029 households in Matteson, including 4,454 families. Of all households, 31.6% had children under the age of 18 living in them, 41.2% were married-couple households, 14.0% had a male householder with no spouse or partner present, and 40.4% had a female householder with no spouse or partner present. About 26.0% of all households were made up of individuals, and 11.6% had someone living alone who was 65 years of age or older.

There were 7,457 housing units, of which 5.7% were vacant. The homeowner vacancy rate was 2.8% and the rental vacancy rate was 9.2%.

=== Income and poverty ===
The median income for a household in the village was $84,611, and the median income for a family was $111,754. Males had a median income of $62,165 versus $40,552 for females. The per capita income for the village was $38,867. About 7.5% of families and 13.6% of the population were below the poverty line, including 23.5% of those under age 18 and 5.1% of those age 65 or over.

== Economy ==
Matteson was home to Lincoln Mall, which was located at Cicero Avenue and US Highway 30. Once one of the Chicago Southland's major regional shopping centers, Lincoln Mall experienced a protracted decline beginning in the 1990s and closed on January 7, 2015. Demolition of the mall site commenced in May 2017. There are currently plans to redevelop the mall property into a mixed-use complex. The Federal Motor Carrier Safety Administration operates its Midwestern Region Service Center in this area and Valspar operates a paint manufacturing facility in Matteson.

== Government ==
Matteson is in Illinois's 2nd congressional district.

Matteson's sister city is Pune, India.

Mayors of Matteson, Illinois

Image	Mayor	Years	Notes
	Frank Allemong	1934 – December 3, 1956	Died in office on December 3, 1956 of a heart attack
	Joseph Feehery	1956 – 1981	
	Mark Stricker	1981 – August 16, 2008	Died in office on August 16, 2008 of a heart attack.
	Andre Ashmore	September 1, 2008 – April 7, 2009; April 7, 2009 – 2017	Appointed to complete the term of Stricker. First African American mayor.
	Sheila Chalmers-Currin	2017 – Present	First African American woman mayor

== Transportation ==
The Matteson station, which opened in 1863, and the 211th Street station both serve Matteson. Metra commuter rail trains on the Metra Electric District travel north to Millennium station and south to University Park station. Pace provides bus service on Route 357 connecting Matteson to destinations across the Southland.

- US 30 (Lincoln Highway) The village's major east–west thoroughfare
- I-57 The village's major north–south thoroughfare
- IL 50 (Cicero Avenue) the village's second north–south thoroughfare
- IL 43 (Harlem Avenue) On the western corner of the village.

== Education ==
Matteson is home to three school districts. Matteson School District 159 and Matteson School District 162 serve separate portions of Matteson for grades PK-8. All of Matteson is within the Rich Township High School District 227.

Matteson School District 162

Elementary

- Arcadia
- Illinois
- Indiana
- Matteson
- Richton Square
- Sauk

Middle

- O.W. Huth

Matteson School District 159

Middle

- Colin Powell

Elementary

- Marya Yates
- Sieden Prairie
- Woodgate

Rich Township High School, the only public high school operated by the high school district, serves Matteson. Previously Matteson was divided between the attendance boundaries of Rich Central High School and Rich South High School.

Residents of the village may also attend Southland College Preparatory Charter High School.

The Matteson Area Public Library District serves the community. Its current library opened in 1993. An addition with 7,500 square feet (700 m^{2}) of space opened in 2015, bringing the total space to 30,300 square feet (2,810 m^{2}).

== Notable people ==
- Jon Asamoah, former NFL player, recently played for the Atlanta Falcons during the 2014–2015 season.
- Dreezy, Rapper, lived on and off in Matteson.
- Kendall Gill, former professional basketball player, grew up in Matteson.
- Robin Kelly, Congresswoman for Illinois’ 2nd congressional district, lives in Matteson.
- Sir Michael Rocks, Rapper
- Tyler Ulis, Professional basketball player
- Gerald Walker, Rapper, grew up in Matteson.
- Charles Brewster Wheeler, U.S. Army brigadier general, born in Matteson

== See also ==
- List of U.S. communities with African-American majority populations in 2020
