= Forest Park Country Club =

Golf course in Adams, Massachusetts, USA

Coordinates: 42.621568°N 73.125592°W

- Interactive map of Forest Park Country Club

Club information
- Location: Adams, Massachusetts, United States
- Established: 1901
- Tota holes: 9
- Par: 34

Forest Park Country Club is a public golf course located in Adams, Massachusetts, United States.

== History ==
Forest Park Country Club opened to the public in 1901. It was designed by Alexander H. Findlay.

== Course layout and hole descriptions ==
The course lies on rolling terrain, with several holes featuring considerable elevation changes. The course is relatively short, with a premium being placed on accuracy off the tee. The greens are generally small, and thus scoring can be largely dependent upon short game abilities, specifically putting, chipping and pitching. Several holes, most notably the 8th hole tee box, feature an excellent view of Mount Greylock, the highest point in the Commonwealth of Massachusetts.

The 1st hole is a short par 4, with a slight dogleg right, with out of bounds on the right hand side. The dogleg is accentuated by a tall fence on the right side of the tee box, which blocks any attempt to drive directly to the green. However, a well placed tee shot which gently moves from left to right will result in a short second shot to a green which is protected by two bunkers short of the green.

The 2nd hole is a straight par 4, with a public road which crosses through the hole approximately 140 yards from the green. Out of bounds lines the right side of the hole. The land area off the tee is sloped significantly from the right to left.

The 3rd hole is a downhill par 3, which plays considerably less than the yardage on the card.

The 4th hole is par 4 dogleg right. The green is significantly elevated in comparison to the fairway.

The 5th hole is an uphill par 3.

The 6th hole is a straight par 4, with out of bounds left.

The 7th hole is a unique par 4, with out of bounds left. The landing area off the tee is right in the middle of an uphill slope, and a tee shot must be very well struck to reach the top of the hill. The approach shot is to a green which drops off steeply on the left hand side.

The 8th hole is a downhill par 4, and the longest hole on the course.

The 9th hole is a short uphill par 4. The green is protected by a bunker short of the putting surface, and out of bounds long.
