= Orland Park Public Library =

Public library in Illinois, US

- 41°37′7.64″N 87°51′22.86″W
- Location: 14921 Ravinia Avenue, Orland Park, Illinois, USA
- Type: Public library
- Established: 1937

Collection
- Size: 258,828

Access and use
- Circulation: 447,937
- Population served: 56,767

Other information
- Director: Mary Adamowski
- Employees: 48
- Website: www.orlandparklibrary.org

The Orland Park Public Library serves the residents of Orland Park, Illinois. Orland Park is a southwest suburb of Chicago. Currently the library services approximately 58,590 residents. The library currently has over 250,000 items available. The library is located at 14921 S. Ravinia Avenue, Orland Park, IL 60462.

== History ==
The Orland Park Public Library was formed in 1937, when the Orland Park Women's Club decided to make the founding of a public library its major activity for the year. Partial funding was provided by a WPA library project through the Illinois State Library Extension board in Springfield. Mr. Roy Loebe donated the Purple Candle Building to use rent-free. Many other donors contributed to the fledgling library.

In 1940, the population of Orland Park was 631. In 1941, the Village Board passed an ordinance establishing a free public library operated by volunteers and stocked by donations. In 1943, a referendum was passed allowing taxes to be levied for the operation of the library.

By 1960, the population had grown to 2,592 and the library began receiving a new state library service, a bookmobile. This service continued until 1967 when the library joined the Suburban Library System. By 1970, the population in Orland Park had grown to 6,391. The Purple Candle Building became too small for the community, and plans were made to move the library into a larger building.

As the Orland Park Herald reported in January 1975, "In an unprecedented gesture of largesse Andrew Corporation gave a gift of a new Library Building to the community of Orland Park at the Village Board meeting on January 13." The 7,000 square foot building, the Aileen S. Andrew Memorial, at 14760 Park Lane was dedicated on November 14, 1976.

The Village of Orland Park kept growing; the population for 1980 was 23,045. The Andrew Foundation once again donated the needed money, providing an addition to the library building, which increased its size to almost 18,500 square feet. Besides the addition completed in August 1983, the library began contracting for bookmobile service from the Frankfort Public Library during the summer.

The 1990 census reported 35,720 residents and the library was again in need of space. The Library Board purchased a bookmobile and an expansion of the building was approved. The second addition added the bookmobile garage, meeting room, boardroom, and Technical Services area. There was also a small remodeling project to add shelves for the public where the old Technical Services area had been. Financing, for the first time, was through a municipal bond issue.

In 2002, the Board of Trustees placed a referendum on the ballot to build a new facility to be located on 149th and Ravinia Avenue, replacing the current facility. The referendum passed with two-thirds of the votes in favor of the proposed building. Michael Barnes, an architect from Lohan Anderson, designed the 93,000 square foot building and W.E. O'Neil was chosen as the General Contractor. The new facility officially opened at 14921 S. Ravinia Avenue on September 12, 2004, and has won numerous awards for its building design.

== Library programs ==
Orland Park Public Library offers a variety of programming for all age groups.

Special programs for babies and toddlers including story time, crafts, playtime, and visits from puppeteers and presenters are scheduled regularly. Smaller children are invited to Discovery Depot, Family Dance Parties, Board Game Fun, educational reviews of states and countries, holiday programming, and more. Some events require that residents sign up early in order to let staff know how many will be in attendance. Older children can come in for science experiments and clubs based around being conscious of people's impact on the environment.

Teens have their own separate section with an iMac, an iPad, computers, age-appropriate books, and a hang-out area. Teen programs encourage youth to take charge and help out by becoming a discovery guide, a techie, or by joining on a variety of service projects. Teens also are invited to book clubs, crafting events, movies, and more.

Adult programming includes assistance with genealogy, learning to use a computer, social media, learning a new language, newspaper services, and more. Adult writers groups, book clubs, and classes are all available. Programming for older adults is also available. Presenters have come in to talk about understanding Medicare and reminiscing about U.S.O. events from World War II.

Special events including singers, artists, historians, chefs, and decorators have also been scheduled.

== Awards ==
- Winner of 2014 Downs Award
- Winner of 2007 Brick In Architecture Awards Competition
- Winner of 2006 Chicago Building Congress Merit Award
