= Park Forest (meteorite) =

Meteorite

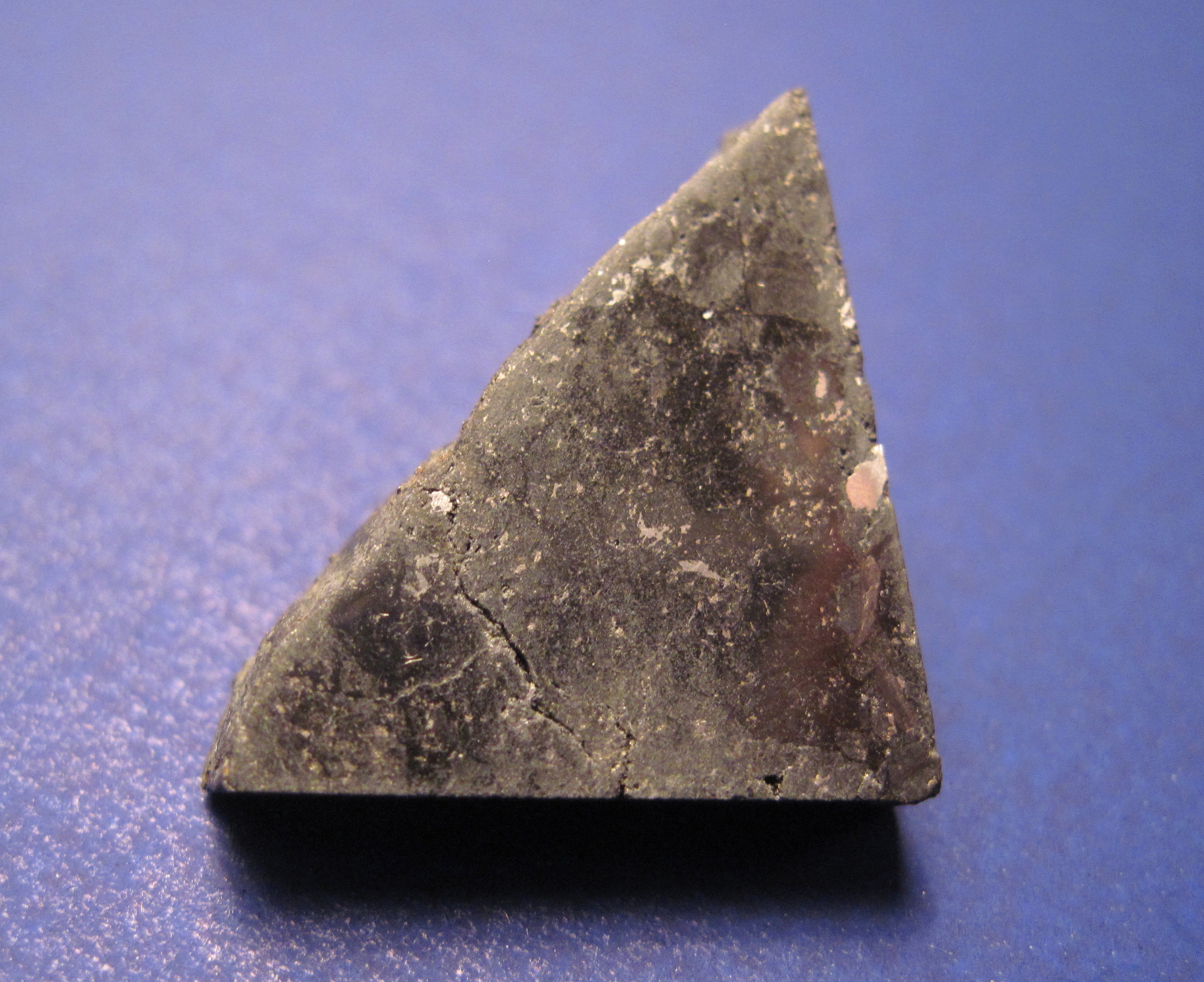
- Type: Chondrite
- Class: Ordinary chondrite
- Group: L5
- Composition: olivine composition Fa_{24.7}, pyroxene Fs_{20.7}W_{o1.6}
- Shock stage: S5
- Weathering grade: W0
- Country: United States
- Region: Cook County, Illinois
- Coordinates: 41°29′5″N 87°40′45″W
- Observed fall: Yes
- Fall date: 2003-03-26
- TKW: 18 kg
- Strewn field: Yes
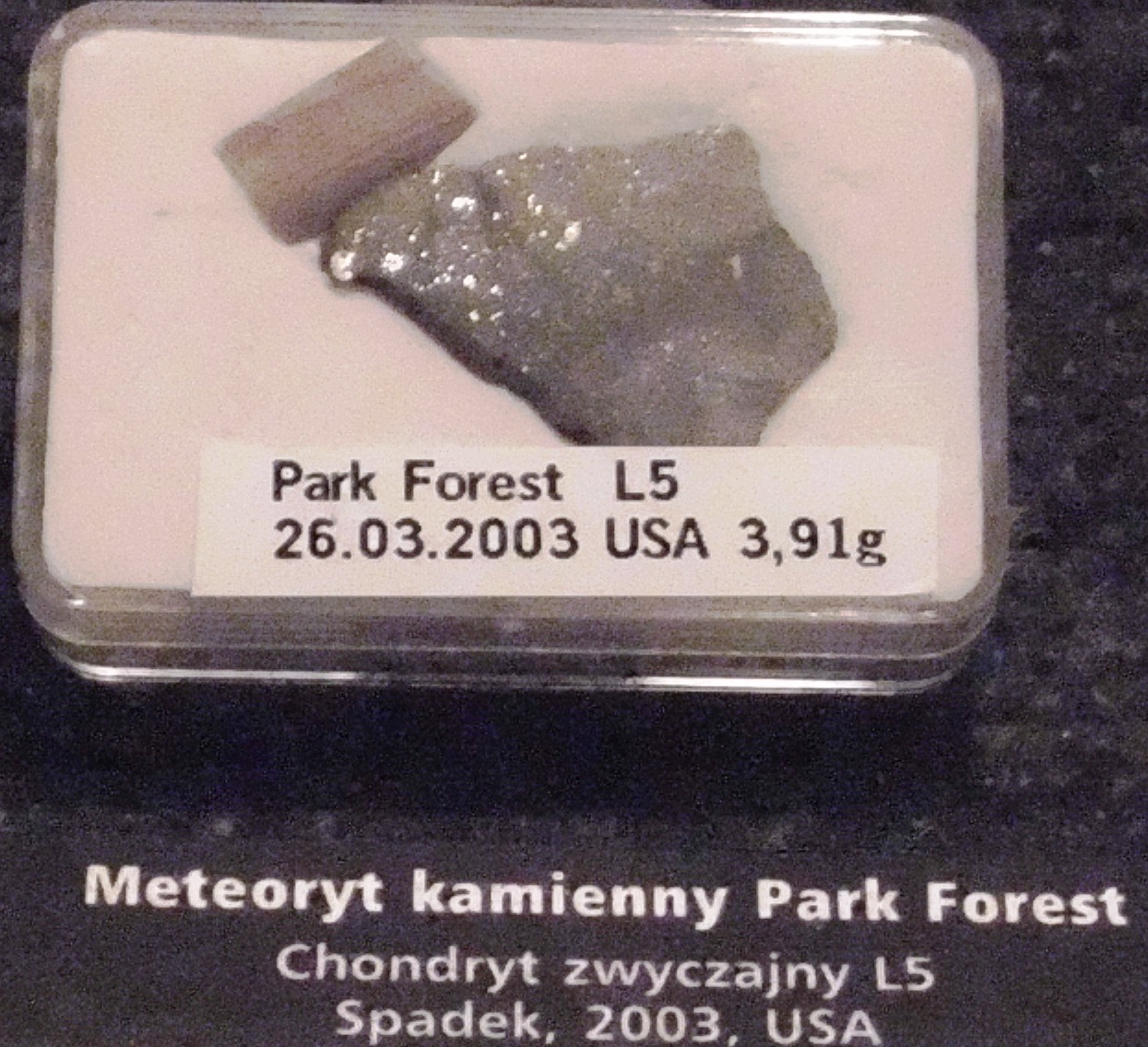
- A small Park Forest fragment
- Related media on Wikimedia Commons

Park Forest is an L5 chondrite meteorite that fell on 26 March 2003 in Illinois, United States.

== History ==
Around midnight on March 26, 2003, a bright orange fireball was spotted in the sky which was visible across Illinois, Indiana, Wisconsin, Michigan, Missouri, and Ohio. Soon after, reports of falling debris were recorded near the village of Park Forest, Illinois. At least two houses in Park Forest were struck, as well as the fire station. In the following days, this event was officially named the Park Forest meteorite, as numerous stones or fragments were recovered in the area. The total mass recovered is above 18 kilograms (40 lb) and the single largest stone is about 3 kilograms (6.6 lb).

Steven Simon (University of Chicago) and seven colleagues from the University of Chicago, the Planetary Studies Foundation, Harper College, Pacific Northwest National Lab, and the Field Museum of Natural History have classified the meteorite fragments that fell on Chicago's southern suburbs on the night of March 26, 2003. That area is described as "the most densely populated region to be hit by a meteorite shower in modern times". The meteoroid is estimated as weighing at least 900 kilograms, and as much as 7000 kilograms upon entering the atmosphere.

== Composition and classification ==
From page A207 of Meteoritics & Planetary Science 38, Nr 7, Supplement, A189–A248 (2003)

Most stones are partly to fully fusion-crusted. Some broken faces show brecciated texture, angular clasts. Cross-cutting dark veins and dark pockets may be of impact melt origin. No visible chondrules in hand sample. Abundant troilite and metal visible in some broken faces. Chondrules and maskelynite are visible in thin section. Mean olivine composition Fa24.7, mean low-Ca pyroxene Fs20.7Wo1.6. Shock stage S5. Specimens: type specimen 515 g (hit fire station), FMNH. Other stones at FMNH: 1200 g, 529 g, 183 g, 159 g, 125 g.

== Specimens ==
At least twelve samples of this meteorite are conserved within the Robert A. Pritzker Center for Meteoritics and Polar Studies at the Field Museum of Natural History of Chicago. While these specimens are not currently on display, they are available for research purposes through the museum.

It is claimed that a large piece which fell through the kitchen ceiling of one Park Forest couple is periodically displayed at the Adler Planetarium.

== See also ==
- Glossary of meteoritics
- Meteorite
