= Seph Lawless =

American photographer

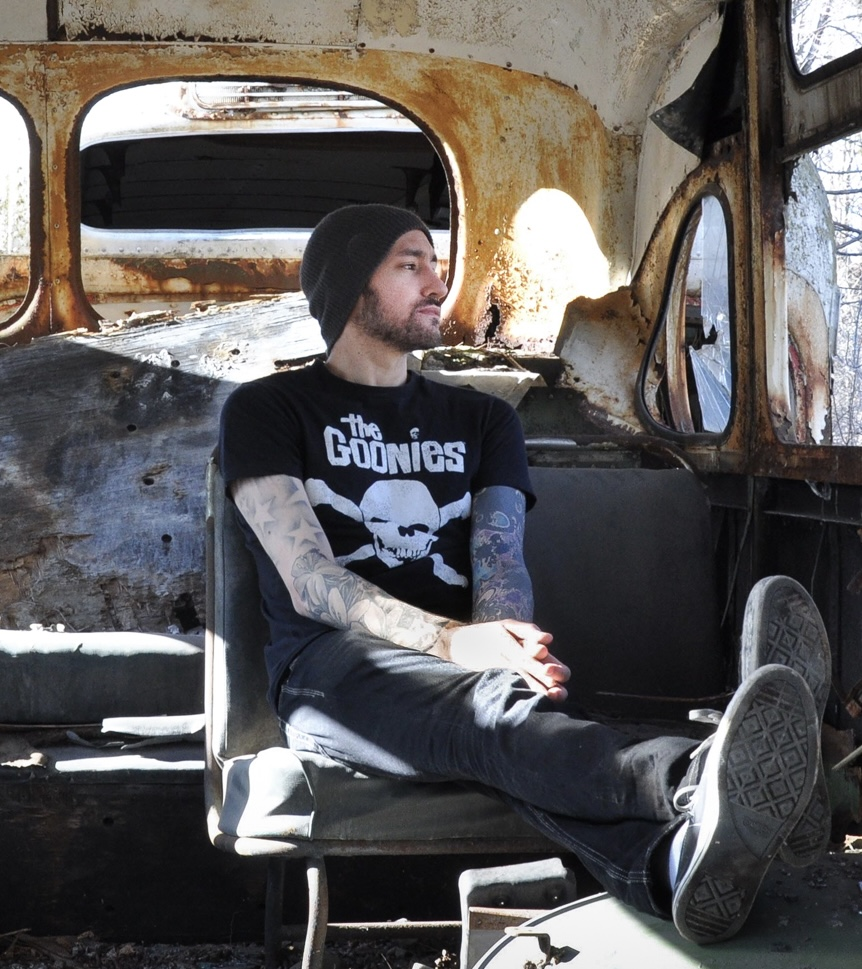
- Occupation: Photographer
- Years active: 2005–present
- Website: Official website

Seph Lawless is an American photographer who has documented urban decay and abandoned spaces in the United States.

== Early life ==
Lawless grew up in a suburb of Cleveland, Ohio. He has stated that his father was a longtime worker at Ford Motor Company.

== Photography ==
In 2012 and 2013, Lawless photographed abandoned industrial infrastructure and other aspects of industrial decline in the Rust Belt and elsewhere in the United States for his self-published 2014 book, Autopsy of America: The Journal Entries of Seph Lawless.

A second book, Black Friday: The Collapse of the American Shopping Mall, contains photos from 2013 and 2014 documenting abandoned and boarded-up shopping malls. He photographed abandoned malls in Michigan and Ohio, including the abandoned Rolling Acres Mall in Akron, Ohio, built in 1975 and closed in 2008, and the Randall Park Mall in North Randall, Ohio, which was said to be the world's largest shopping center at the time of its opening in the 1970s, and which closed in 2009.

In March 2016, his photographs of Disney's River Country, an abandoned section of Disney World, were published in various media outlets, and he claimed to have been banned from entering Disney World after photographing and sharing his images to the press. In March 2016 Lawless also took photos in Picher, Oklahoma, a toxic abandoned town which the Environmental Protection Agency had mandated to be evacuated in 2006.

In 2017, he photographed houses in the Beachwood neighborhood of High River, Alberta, Canada that had been abandoned due to a floodplain relocation program after the 2013 Alberta floods. Lawless's Huffington Post article and photographs were criticized in local media by the High River mayor, who said, "When you do things like this and you enter homes, you stage it with teddy bears, you move lamp posts around and you do all of these things to try and sensationalize stuff, it hurts people."

=== Themes ===
As an urban explorer photographer, Lawless has recorded abandoned shopping malls and other developments, with the stated intention of informing people of the depth and failures of capitalism, consumption, globalization, and national economic policies. In 2014 he stated that he wanted to show Americans "what was happening to their country from the comfort of their suburban homes and smartphones." A large proportion of the abandoned malls, buildings, and amusement parks he photographs are in the Rust Belt, which has been heavily affected by the various economic changes of recent decades.

== Publications ==
- Autopsy of America: The Journal Entries of Seph Lawless. Self-published, 2014. ISBN 9780615875781.
- Black Friday: The Collapse of the American Shopping Mall. Self-published, 2014. OCLC 889105593.
- 13: An American Horror Story. Self-published, 2014.
- The Last Lap: North Wilkesboro Speedway Is Losing a Race Against Time. Self-published, 2015.
- The Trolley Tragedy of 1957. Self-published, 2015.
- The Variety Theater: The Night Motörhead Brought Down the House. Self-published, 2015.
- Hauntingly Beautiful (13th Series). Self-published, 2015.
- Pet Cemetery...In Loving Memory. USA: Self-published, 2015.
- Bizarro: The World's Most Hauntingly Beautiful Abandoned Theme Parks. Self-published, 2015.
- The Prelude: The Deadliest City in America. Self-published, 2016.
- Black Friday: Seasons in the Size of Days. Self-published, 2016.
- Autopsy of America: Death of a Nation. UK: Carpet Bombing Culture, 2017. ISBN 9781908211491.
- Abandoned: Hauntingly Beautiful Deserted Theme Parks. New York City: Skyhorse, 2017. ISBN 9781510723351.

== Exhibitions ==
- The Autopsy of America, foyer, Amerika Haus, Munich, Germany, 2014

== See also ==
- Dead mall
- Ruins photography
