= Sauk Trail =

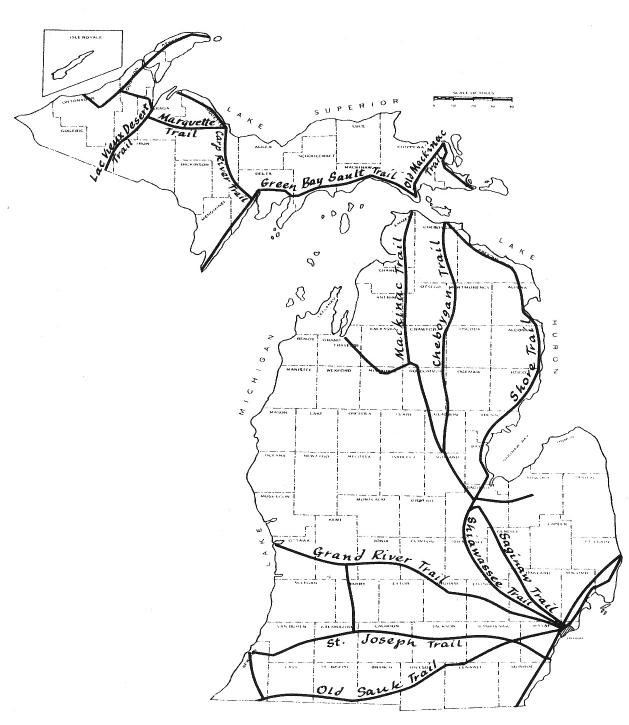
Pre-Statehood Trails of Michigan

The Sauk Trail was originally a Native American trail running through what are present-day Illinois, Indiana and Michigan in the United States. From west to east, the trail ran from Rock Island on the Mississippi River to the Illinois River near modern Peru then along the north bank of that river to Joliet, and on to Valparaiso, Indiana. Then it ran northeasterly to La Porte and into southern Michigan running through Niles, Sturgis, Ypsilanti, and ending at the Detroit River near Detroit.

Sections of the trail appeared to follow the southern boundary between the dense forest and the mixed grassland regions. The identification of a mastodon trailway along the same path indicates that the Native Americans may have been using a long established game trail, as they did in other areas, for instance where they followed bison paths.

In 1820 Henry Schoolcraft, then at present-day Michigan City, Indiana, described the trail, as a "plain horse path, which is considerably traveled by traders, hunters, and others..." and said that a stranger could not follow it without the services of a guide because of the numerous side trails. The Sauk Trail intersected many important trails and early roads, including trails to Vincennes, to Green Bay, to Fort Wayne and to Little Traverse Bay.

== Illinois ==
In Illinois, not much is known about the exact path. Scholars believe it likely ran along the Illinois River, and past what was at one point, the "Grand Village of the Illini", near current-day Utica. Settlers also used this trail, and U.S. Route 6 (US 6) ultimately was built along the same rough route.

It ran from Rock Island to Peru and follows the northern bank of the Illinois River to Joliet. Settler accounts note that where the Rock River joined the Mississippi River was the beginning of a native path that continued eastward to Chicago. A highway named Sauk Trail runs from Frankfort, Illinois, through Park Forest, Illinois, to just west of the state line at Dyer, Indiana. US 12 was built along a known portion of the Sauk Trail that ultimately ends in Detroit. US 6 parallels, at various points, the Illinois and Des Plaines rivers' paths, and some of their tributaries. Natives and later settlers often found pathways easiest along the river banks.

== Indiana ==
The transition of the trail from Illinois to Indiana is uncertain. A Great Sauk Trail memorial was installed outside of Iddings Elementary School in Merrillville, Indiana. It has been established that the trail ran through what is today Valparaiso, then into La Porte and on to Michigan. Today Rte 30 transitions to Rte 2 along this route.

== Michigan ==
In Michigan, the route of the modern US Highway 12 has been associated with the Sauk Trail since 1962. Before that year, US 112 was the roadway along this route. The route in Michigan has also been known as the Chicago Road or Chicago Trail.

== In literature ==
- Greene, Merritt. (1959). The land lies pretty = "Op-Jah-mo-mak-y-a": a story of the Great Sauk Trail in 1832 with an introduction to the Northwest Territory. Hillsdale, Mich.: Hillsdale School Supply.

== See also ==
- Saginaw Trail, another trail named after the Sac people
