= Elementary School District 159 =

School district in Cook County, Illinois, USA

Address
- 20700 Matteson Avenue Matteson, Illinois, 60443; United States

District information
- Type: Public
- Grades: PreK–8
- NCES District ID: 1736300

Students and staff
- Students: 1,779

Other information
- Website: www.dist159.com

Elementary School District 159 (ESD 159), also known as Matteson School District 159, is a school district headquartered in Matteson, Illinois near Chicago, United States.

The district serves portions of Matteson, Richton Park, Frankfort, and Tinley Park. As of 2017 it has 2,100 students.

== History ==
The first school in what would become the district, the Sieden Prairie Schoolhouse, opened in 1869. The district headquarters was located on the former site of the schoolhouse. The district considers 1869 as its date of establishment.

From 2007 to 2016, multiple employees were related to a total of eight people who served on the school board. In 2016 the school district did not have a specific policy that addressed the practice of nepotism.

Mable Alfred served as superintendent. In December 2018, the school board voted to remove Alfred from per position. In May 2019, five members of the school board voted to make Alfred the superintendent again, while one voted against the proposal and with one more not voting.

== Schools ==
Middle schools:

- Colin Powell Middle School (Matteson)

Elementary schools:

- Neil Armstrong School (Richton Park)
- Sieden Prairie School (Matteson)
- Woodgate School (Matteson)
- Marya Yates School (Matteson)

It previously operated Sedan Prairie School in Tinley Park.

The Vollmer Road headquarters is on the grounds of the former Sieden Prairie School. The previous headquarters was in the Marya Yates Building on Allemong Drive.
