= Richton Park, Illinois =

- Village
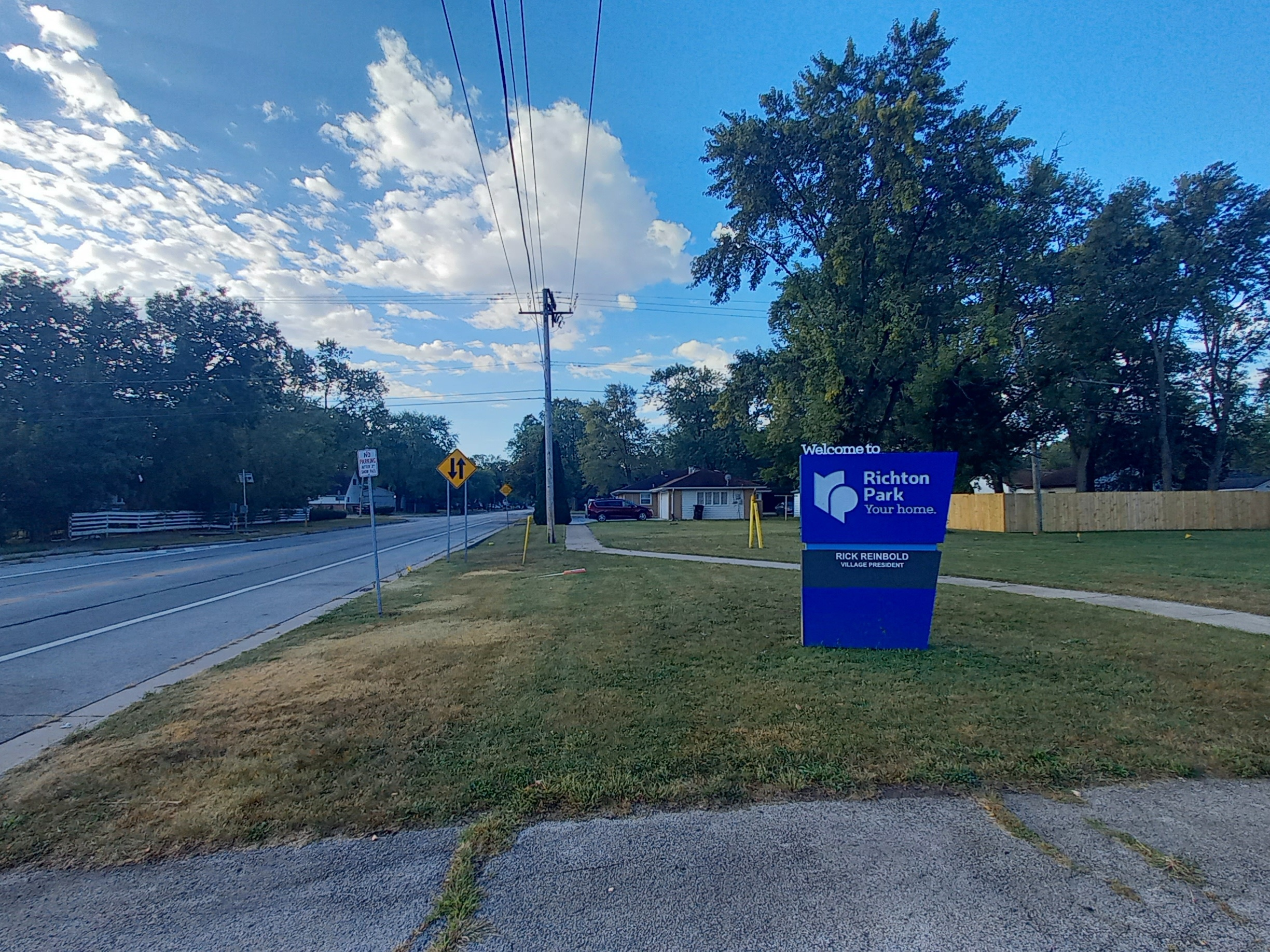
- Welcome sign at Main Street

- Seal
- Motto: "Proud Past; Bright Future"
- Location of Richton Park in Cook County, Illinois.

- Location within Chicago metropolitan area Location within Illinois Location within the United States
- Coordinates: 41°28′55″N 87°43′31″W
- Country: United States
- State: Illinois
- County: Cook
- Township: Rich

Area
  - Total: 4.41 sq mi (11.41 km^{2})
  - Land: 4.39 sq mi (11.37 km^{2})
  - Water: 0.012 sq mi (0.03 km^{2})

Population (2020)
  - Total: 12,775
  - Density: 2,908.8/sq mi (1,123.08/km^{2})
- Time zone: UTC-6 (CST)
  - Summer (DST): UTC-5 (CDT)
- ZIP Code(s): 60471, 60443
- Area code: 708
- FIPS code: 17-63706
- Website: www.richtonpark.org

Richton Park is a village in Cook County, Illinois, United States. The population was 12,775 at the 2020 census. It is a south suburb of Chicago.

== History ==
Richton Park sits along the Sauk Trail, a major trail used by the several Native American tribes for travel. By the 1840s German migrants settled in the area and created a small farming community.

The village was named after a Richton in Vermont, the native home of a first settler.

On the evening of June 7, 2008, an EF2 tornado went through portions of Richton Park, damaging homes and businesses.

== Geography ==
Richton Park is located at 41°28′55″N 87°43′31″W (41.481992, -87.725352).

The village is bordered by Matteson to the north, Park Forest to the east, and University Park to the south.

According to the 2021 census gazetteer files, Richton Park has a total area of 4.40 square miles (11.40 km^{2}), of which 4.39 square miles (11.37 km^{2}) (or 99.73%) is land and 0.01 square miles (0.03 km^{2}) (or 0.27%) is water.

== Demographics ==
Historical population
Census	Pop.	Note	%±
1930	137		—
1940	107		−21.9%
1950	232		116.8%
1960	933		302.2%
1970	2,558		174.2%
1980	9,403		267.6%
1990	10,523		11.9%
2000	12,533		19.1%
2010	13,646		8.9%
2020	12,775		−6.4%
U.S. Decennial Census; 2010 2020

=== Racial and ethnic composition ===
Richton Park village, Illinois – Racial and ethnic composition Note: the US Census treats Hispanic/Latino as an ethnic category. This table excludes Latinos from the racial categories and assigns them to a separate category. Hispanics/Latinos may be of any race.
Race / Ethnicity (NH = Non-Hispanic)	Pop 2000	Pop 2010	Pop 2020	% 2000	% 2010	% 2020
White alone (NH)	4,232	1,543	804	33.77%	11.31%	6.29%
Black or African American alone (NH)	7,374	11,156	10,988	58.84%	81.75%	86.01%
Native American or Alaska Native alone (NH)	26	12	21	0.21%	0.09%	0.16%
Asian alone (NH)	188	136	94	1.50%	1.00%	0.74%
Pacific Islander alone (NH)	4	8	1	0.03%	0.06%	0.01%
Other race alone (NH)	25	19	34	0.20%	0.14%	0.27%
Mixed race or Multiracial (NH)	200	295	291	1.60%	2.16%	2.28%
Hispanic or Latino (any race)	484	477	542	3.86%	3.50%	4.24%
Total	12,533	13,646	12,775	100.00%	100.00%	100.00%

=== 2020 census ===
As of the 2020 census, Richton Park had a population of 12,775, with 5,063 households and 3,298 families.

The median age was 40.1 years. 21.7% of residents were under the age of 18 and 14.7% were 65 years of age or older. For every 100 females, there were 80.5 males, and for every 100 females age 18 and over, there were 74.6 males.

The population density was 2,900.77 inhabitants per square mile (1,119.99/km^{2}). There were 5,487 housing units at an average density of 1,245.91 per square mile (481.05/km^{2}).

Of housing units in Richton Park, 7.7% were vacant. The homeowner vacancy rate was 2.4% and the rental vacancy rate was 9.9%.

99.0% of residents lived in urban areas, while 1.0% lived in rural areas.

Of households in Richton Park, 31.0% had children under the age of 18 living in them. Of all households, 31.0% were married-couple households, 17.4% were households with a male householder and no spouse or partner present, and 46.4% were households with a female householder and no spouse or partner present. About 32.6% of all households were made up of individuals, and 11.5% had someone living alone who was 65 years of age or older.

=== Income and poverty ===
The median income for a household in the village was $63,777, and the median income for a family was $82,208. Males had a median income of $49,393 versus $43,399 for females. The per capita income for the village was $28,756. About 8.3% of families and 11.4% of the population were below the poverty line, including 8.6% of those under age 18 and 25.1% of those age 65 or over.

== Education ==
Matteson School District 162 is headquartered in Richton Park and serves portions of the village.

- Richton Square School
- Sauk Elementary School

Elementary School District 159 serves portions of Richton Park.

- Neil A. Armstrong School

Rich Township High School Fine Arts and Communications Campus and Southland College Preparatory Charter High School are the two public high schools that serve Richton Park, both schools are located in the village.

The Richton Park Public Library District has served the village since 1972.

== Transportation ==
The Richton Park station provides Metra commuter rail service along the Metra Electric District. Trains travel north to Millennium station in Chicago, and south to University Park station.

== Notable places ==
- Rich City Skate (Formerly Olympic Skate World) - Featured in the HBO documentary United Skates, highlighting African American roller skating rinks.

== Government ==
Richton Park is in Illinois's 2nd congressional district.
