= Park Forest, Illinois =

- Village
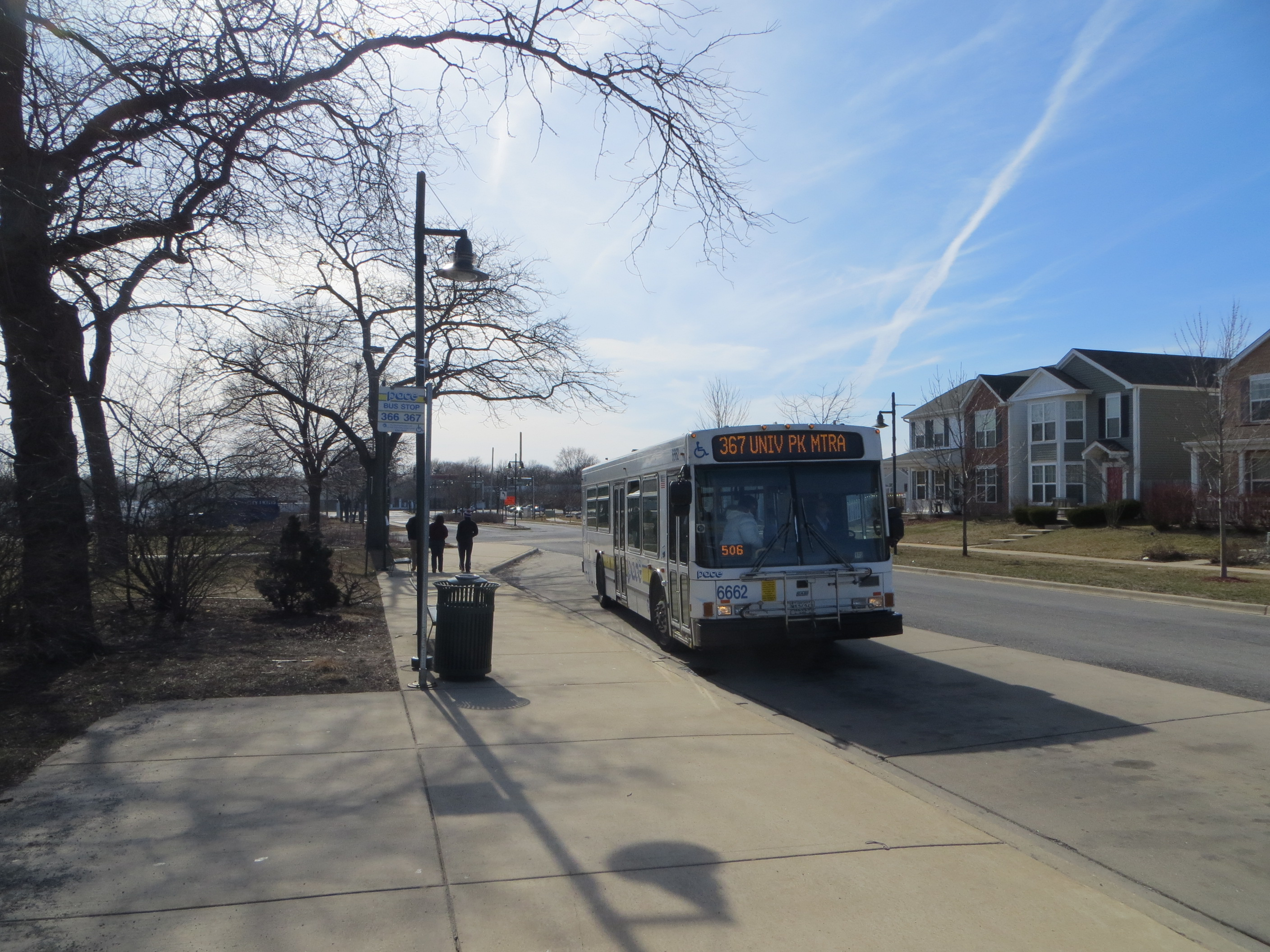
- Pace bus stop at Main Street, April 2013

- Flag
- Motto: "Live Grow Discover"
- Location of Park Forest in Cook and Will Counties, Illinois.

- Location within Chicago metropolitan area Location within Illinois Location within the United States
- Coordinates: 41.492°N 87.674°W
- Country: United States
- State: Illinois
- Counties: Cook, Will
- Township: Cook: Rich, Bloom; Will: Monee

Government
  - Mayor: Joe Woods

Area
  - Total: 4.96 sq mi (12.85 km^{2})
  - Land: 4.96 sq mi (12.85 km^{2})
  - Water: 0 sq mi (0.00 km^{2})
- Elevation: 712 ft (217 m)

Population (2020)
  - Total: 21,687
  - Density: 4,371.2/sq mi (1,687.74/km^{2})
- Time zone: UTC−6 (CST)
  - Summer (DST): UTC−5 (CDT)
- ZIP Code(s): 60466
- Area code: 708
- FIPS code: 17-57732
- Website: www.villageofparkforest.com

Park Forest is a village and south suburb of Chicago in Cook County, Illinois, United States, with a small southern portion in Will County. The village was originally designed by Loebl Schlossman & Bennett as a planned community for veterans returning from World War II. As of the 2020 census, the village had a population of 21,687.

Park Forest is bordered by Olympia Fields to the north, Chicago Heights to the east, University Park to the south, and Richton Park and Matteson to the west. The village has multiple public and private schools. In addition to the arts and culture scene including Tall Grass Arts Association and the Illinois Theatre Center, residents also have access to a myriad of recreational opportunities for both children and adults such as the Park Forest Aqua Center.

== History ==
Developers Nathan Manilow, Carroll F. Sweet and Philip M. Klutznick held a press conference in the Palmer House Hilton in Chicago on October 28, 1946, to announce the planned development of a new self-governing community in Chicago's south suburbs. This project, soon to be referred to as Park Forest, was to be developed by American Community Builders (ACB). The village of Park Forest was partly designed by town planner Elbert Peets in the tradition of planned communities around the nation to provide housing for veterans returning from World War II.

Studs Terkel, in his oral history of World War II, The Good War, says Park Forest and other such middle-class suburbs grew out of the new prosperity after the war. First he quotes an unnamed GI, "The war changed our whole idea of how we wanted to live when we came back. We set our sights pretty high. . . . I am now what you'd call middle class." Terkel goes on: "The suburb, until [about 1946], had been the exclusive domain of the 'upper class.' It was where the rich lived. The rest of us were neighborhood folk. At war's end, a new kind of suburb came into being. . . . Thanks to the GI bill, two new names were added to American folksay: Levittown and Park Forest.

"A new middle class had emerged. Until now, the great many, even before the Depression, had had to scuffle from one payday to the next. . . . [Before there had only been one] car on the block. Now everybody was getting a car. Oh, it was exciting. (Terkel, p. 12)"

Park Forest was honored in 1954 as an "All-America City" for its citizens' help in the creation of Rich Township High School, on Sauk Trail. It was awarded this same honor again in 1976 for open housing and racial integration and initiatives. A village landmark was the Park Forest Plaza, an outdoor regional shopping center of over 50 stores and restaurants which included Sears, Marshall Fields and Goldblatt's.

In 1956, William H. Whyte, an editor at Fortune magazine, published a book called The Organization Man that defined the nature of corporate life for a generation. The book described how America (whose people, he said, had "led in the public worship of individualism") had recently turned into a nation of employees who "take the vows of organization life" and who had become "the dominant members of our society". Park Forest was one of the communities that figured most prominently in Whyte's study of the home life of "the organization man," and should be read by anyone seeking an insight into early Park Forest.

By 1949, the village was home to a chapter of the National Council of Jewish Women, a B'nai B'rith lodge and a Hebrew school (Sunday School). By 1955, a second Hebrew school had opened and three new women's groups had formed, including chapters of Hadassah, the National Federation of Temple Sisterhoods (later renamed Women of Reform Judaism) and a B'nai B'rith Auxiliary. In 1951 and 1957, synagogues opened in Park Forest as Jews became 15% of the population. By 2013, both synagogues had moved outside the town. Although officially desegregated from its inception, Park Forest's first African-American family took residence there in 1959.

Park Forest is known for the "Scenic 10", a 10-mile (16 km) race held annually on Labor Day that attracts runners from around the globe. In 2008, the race was shortened to a 5-mile (8.0 km) course to attract more local runners and renamed the "Scenic Five".

On March 26, 2003, a meteor exploded over the Midwest, showering Park Forest with dozens of meteorite fragments. These fragments are currently on display at the Field Museum in Chicago. For further reading see Park Forest (meteorite).

== Geography ==
According to the 2021 census gazetteer files, Park Forest has a total area of 4.96 square miles (12.85 km^{2}), all land.

The village is generally bounded by U.S. Highway 30 on the north, Western Avenue on the east, Central Park Avenue on the west and Thorn Creek on the south. Parts of Park Forest are east of Western Avenue, however, including a subdivision called "Eastgate". Park Forest is bisected by the Elgin, Joliet and Eastern Railway (now the Canadian National Railway) double-track main line, which was paralleled a little further north by the Michigan Central (New York Central) railroad. That rail line has been converted to a nature trail called Old Plank Trail. The beginning of the trail is at Western Avenue, and it runs through Park Forest west to Joliet.

=== Recreations ===
Park Forest offers a variety of recreational services to its residents and surrounding neighborhoods including the Park Forest Aqua Center, the Park Forest Tennis and Health Club, and park district classes and sports teams.

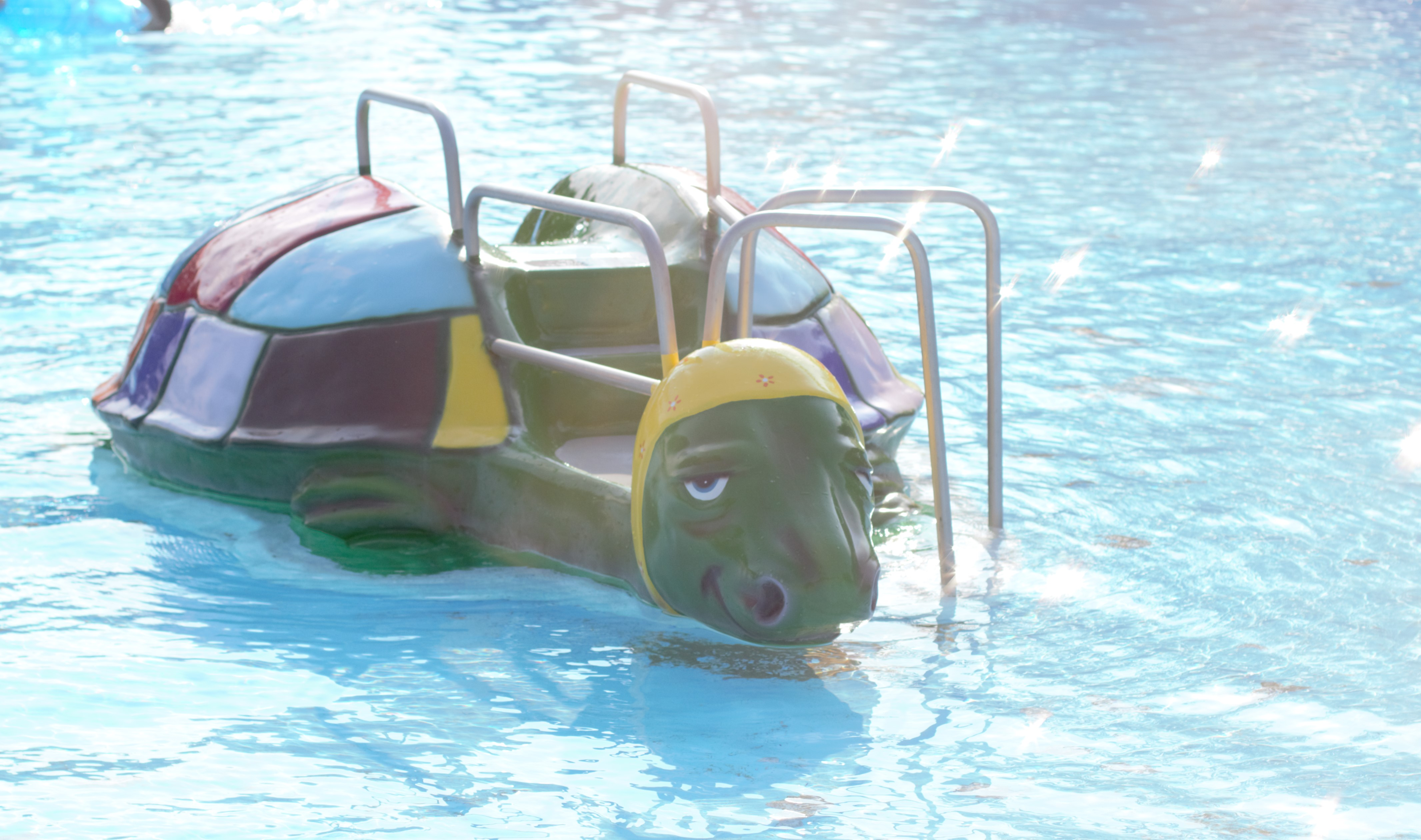
Turtle Slide at Park Forest Aqua Center

==== Park Forest Aqua Center ====
Park Forest Aqua Center has been a neighborhood institution since 1952. Both seasonal memberships and daily passes are available. Patrons can enjoy a beach pool for toddlers, the 160-foot water slide, 2 drop slides, a 15-foot aquatic climbing wall, and the East Pool, which is designed for adults to swim laps. Additionally, the Aqua Center also has a sand area and a concession stand.

Summer season opens to the public in the beginning of June and ends on Labor Day. Throughout the season, the Aqua Center offers special events, such as Members Only Kickoff, Hawaiian Night, Glow Swim, and Carnival Night, as well as multiple swim lesson programs:

==== Park Forest Tennis and Health Club ====
For over thirty years, the Park Forest Tennis and Health Club has offered residents a place to play tennis and workout. In addition to six indoor tennis courts and a fitness area, the club also has saunas in the locker rooms, a courtside lounge, professional tennis instructors, racquet stringing, and a pro shop.

The Tennis and Health Club offers multiple types of tennis lessons. Group lessons are available for children and adults. The club also offers private lessons and the Junior Excellence program, which is available to junior high and high school students who are interested in competing.

==== Park District Programs ====
The Park Forest Park District runs seasonal programs open to both residents and non-residents and includes a variety of programs for all ages. The Park District offers sports, health & wellness, and dance programs, in addition to special day trips and art classes.

=== Architecture ===
In celebration of the 2018 Illinois Bicentennial, the Park Forest was selected as one of the Illinois 200 Great Places by the American Institute of Architects Illinois component (AIA Illinois).

=== Climate ===
Climate data for Park Forest, Illinois (1991–2020 normals, extremes 1952–present)
Month	Jan	Feb	Mar	Apr	May	Jun	Jul	Aug	Sep	Oct	Nov	Dec	Year
Record high °F (°C)	65 (18)	71 (22)	86 (30)	89 (32)	97 (36)	102 (39)	102 (39)	103 (39)	99 (37)	91 (33)	77 (25)	70 (21)	103 (39)
Mean daily maximum °F (°C)	31.1 (−0.5)	35.2 (1.8)	46.4 (8.0)	59.3 (15.2)	70.6 (21.4)	80.2 (26.8)	83.9 (28.8)	82.0 (27.8)	75.8 (24.3)	63.1 (17.3)	48.2 (9.0)	36.3 (2.4)	59.3 (15.2)
Daily mean °F (°C)	23.2 (−4.9)	26.8 (−2.9)	37.2 (2.9)	48.8 (9.3)	60.0 (15.6)	69.5 (20.8)	73.9 (23.3)	72.0 (22.2)	65.2 (18.4)	52.8 (11.6)	39.8 (4.3)	28.9 (−1.7)	49.8 (9.9)
Mean daily minimum °F (°C)	15.2 (−9.3)	18.4 (−7.6)	28.1 (−2.2)	38.3 (3.5)	49.3 (9.6)	58.9 (14.9)	63.8 (17.7)	62.0 (16.7)	54.6 (12.6)	42.4 (5.8)	31.4 (−0.3)	21.5 (−5.8)	40.3 (4.6)
Record low °F (°C)	−27 (−33)	−21 (−29)	−6 (−21)	9 (−13)	25 (−4)	36 (2)	45 (7)	41 (5)	29 (−2)	17 (−8)	0 (−18)	−21 (−29)	−27 (−33)
Average precipitation inches (mm)	2.49 (63)	2.15 (55)	2.65 (67)	4.02 (102)	4.57 (116)	4.91 (125)	4.73 (120)	4.02 (102)	3.44 (87)	3.65 (93)	3.00 (76)	2.47 (63)	42.10 (1,069)
Average snowfall inches (cm)	10.2 (26)	7.5 (19)	4.9 (12)	0.5 (1.3)	0.0 (0.0)	0.0 (0.0)	0.0 (0.0)	0.0 (0.0)	0.0 (0.0)	0.2 (0.51)	0.9 (2.3)	4.0 (10)	28.2 (72)
Average precipitation days (≥ 0.01 in)	10.6	9.0	10.2	12.1	13.1	10.4	9.4	9.1	8.3	10.5	10.1	10.7	123.5
Average snowy days (≥ 0.1 in)	5.9	4.6	2.6	0.4	0.0	0.0	0.0	0.0	0.0	0.1	0.9	3.7	18.2
Source: NOAA

== Demographics ==
Historical population
Census	Pop.	Note	%±
1950	8,138		—
1960	29,993		268.6%
1970	30,638		2.2%
1980	26,222		−14.4%
1990	24,656		−6.0%
2000	23,462		−4.8%
2010	21,975		−6.3%
2020	21,687		−1.3%
U.S. Decennial Census; 2010 2020

=== Racial and ethnic composition ===
Park Forest village, Illinois – Racial and ethnic composition Note: the US Census treats Hispanic/Latino as an ethnic category. This table excludes Latinos from the racial categories and assigns them to a separate category. Hispanics/Latinos may be of any race.
Race / Ethnicity (NH = Non-Hispanic)	Pop 2000	Pop 2010	Pop 2020	% 2000	% 2010	% 2020
White alone (NH)	12,412	6,759	3,828	52.90%	30.76%	17.65%
Black or African American alone (NH)	9,144	12,977	15,022	38.97%	59.05%	69.27%
Native American or Alaska Native alone (NH)	34	37	25	0.14%	0.17%	0.12%
Asian alone (NH)	188	157	150	0.80%	0.71%	0.69%
Native Hawaiian or Pacific Islander alone (NH)	16	10	9	0.07%	0.05%	0.04%
Other race alone (NH)	47	41	131	0.20%	0.19%	0.60%
Mixed race or Multiracial (NH)	452	587	840	1.93%	2.67%	3.87%
Hispanic or Latino (any race)	1,169	1,407	1,682	4.98%	6.40%	7.76%
Total	23,462	21,975	21,687	100.00%	100.00%	100.00%

=== 2020 census ===
As of the 2020 census, Park Forest had a population of 21,687. The population density was 4,371.50 inhabitants per square mile (1,687.85/km^{2}). The median age was 39.1 years. 23.0% of residents were under the age of 18 and 17.0% of residents were 65 years of age or older. For every 100 females there were 81.7 males, and for every 100 females age 18 and over there were 75.6 males age 18 and over.

99.9% of residents lived in urban areas, while 0.1% lived in rural areas.

There were 8,809 households in Park Forest, including 4,738 families, and 30.8% of households had children under the age of 18 living in them. Of all households, 27.1% were married-couple households, 18.5% were households with a male householder and no spouse or partner present, and 48.5% were households with a female householder and no spouse or partner present. About 34.9% of all households were made up of individuals, and 15.8% had someone living alone who was 65 years of age or older.

There were 9,701 housing units at an average density of 1,955.45 per square mile (755.00/km^{2}), of which 9.2% were vacant. The homeowner vacancy rate was 4.9% and the rental vacancy rate was 8.4%.

=== Income and poverty ===
The median income for a household in the village was $56,393, and the median income for a family was $65,507. Males had a median income of $41,744 versus $40,219 for females. The per capita income for the village was $26,078. About 5.8% of families and 12.6% of the population were below the poverty line, including 10.7% of those under age 18 and 13.3% of those age 65 or over.

== Arts and culture ==
=== The Illinois Theatre Center ===
The Illinois Theatre Center was established in 1976 by Steve and Etel Billig. At its inception, it was located in Park Forest's public library but was later moved to Downtown Park Forest in 1999. In addition to the main stage series of six plays, the theatre offers programs like The Drama School which provides acting classes for children, teens and adults.

=== Freedom Hall Performing Arts Theatre ===
Freedom Hall Performing Arts Theatre is a performing arts theatre and concert hall situated in Park Forest, Illinois. It offers a variety of concerts and theatre performances. Since the opening of Park Forest's Cultural Arts Center in 1976, Freedom Hall Nathan Manilow Theatre has presented performance arts in the form of theater groups, recitals, lecture events, etc.

The Nathan Manilow Theatre has 287 seats. This theatre has presented a variety of events of all genres for more than thirty years. Such shows include Tom Dreessen, C.J Chenier, The Chicago City Ballet, The National Theatre of the Deaf, Joseph Holmes Chicago Dance Theatre, Tom Chapin, Muntu Dance Theatre of Chicago, Corky Siegel, George Winston, The Second City Touring Company, John Houseman, Peter Mayer and many other performances. The goal of such performances is to present the finest cultural events for the Park Forest community and other residents of the Chicago area.

=== Museum Home ===
The 1950s Park Forest House Museum is meant to replicate an original home. It was built in 1947-1949 and now stands as a house has remained furnished the same way it originally was back in the years of 1948–1953, just as it was during the first five years that it was occupied by tenants. Visiting this site provides people with the ability to uniquely experience the history of Park Forest, a suburb built after the conclusion of World War II. Initially designed to help veterans and their families returning from the war, it would later become an attraction for enthusiasts of the era.

Visitors can open drawers, cupboards, and closets containing period treasures. Consistent with the way the house was furnished, dolls, toys, built-in bookcases and even a collection of clothes from that period may be found. One of the rooms even recreates a classroom from the very first school in the town.

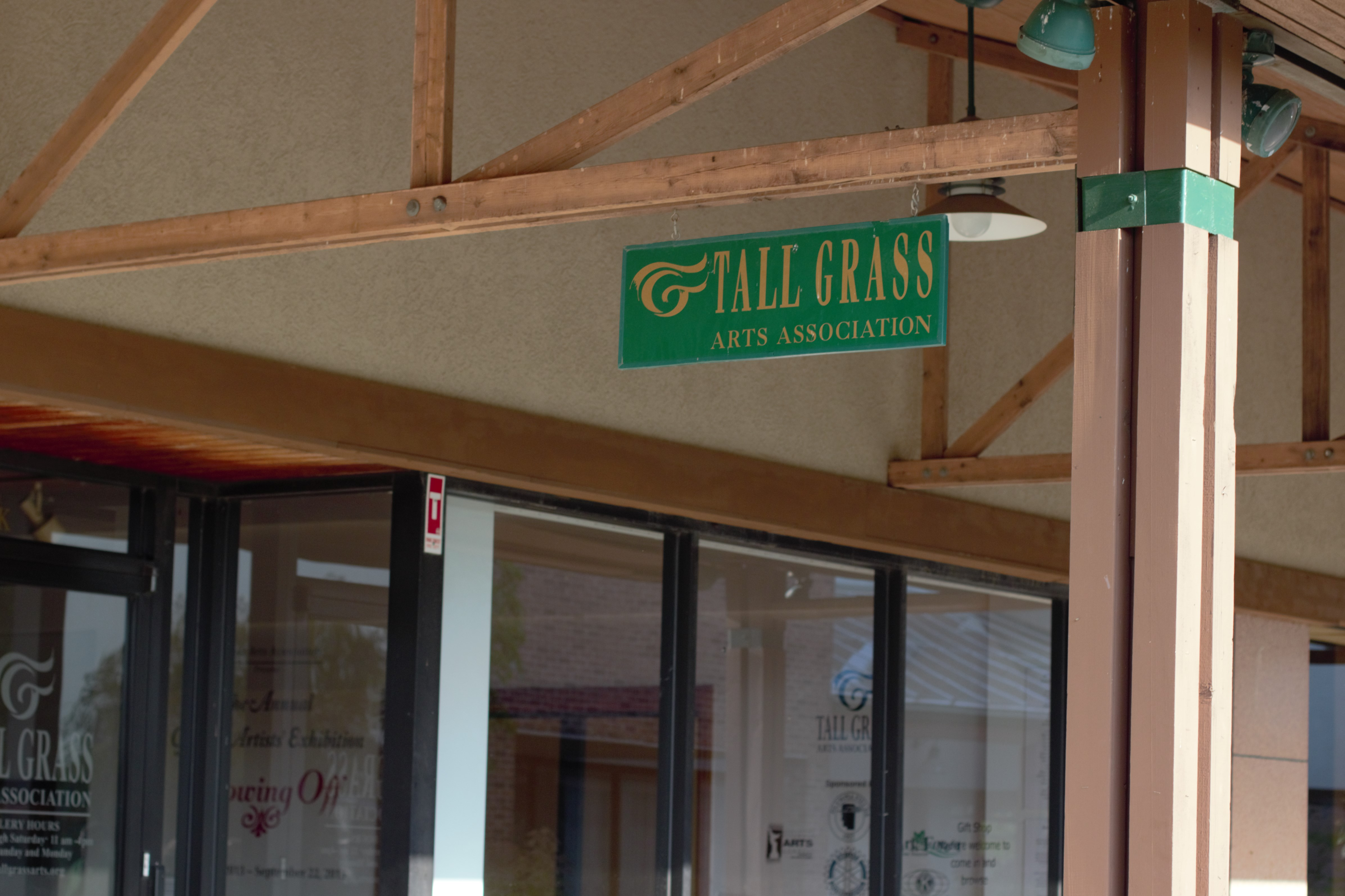

=== Tall Grass Arts Association ===
Tall Grass Arts Association is located in downtown Park Forest Cultural Center; the Tall Grass Arts Association operates a regional art gallery where juried artists are invited to participate in the annual fine arts fair held in September in downtown Park Forest. Artists can display their work in the gallery at least once a year in addition to including their work in the Tall Grass Gift Shop.

== Government ==
Park Forest is in Illinois's 2nd congressional district.

=== List of mayors of Park Forest ===
Mayors of Park Forest, Illinois

Image	Mayor	Years	Notes
	Dennis O'Harrow	1949–1950	First mayor of Park Forest
	Henry X. Dietch	1950–1955	
	Robert A. Dinerstein	1955–1961	
	Bernard G. Cunningham	1961–1971	
	Ralph G. Johnson	1971–1975	
	Mayer Singerman	1975–1981	
	Ronald Bean	1981–1986	First African American mayor
	Jerry Mathews	1986–1991	
	F. Patrick Kelly	1991–1999	
	John Ostenburg	1999–2019	
	Jonathan Vanderbilt	2019–2023	
	Joe Woods	2023–Present	Second African American mayor

== Education ==
School districts serving Park Forest include:

- Matteson School District 162
- Park Forest Chicago Heights School District 163
- Rich Township High School District 227
  - The Rich Township High School District 227 have voted to close Rich East High School. The students would be relocated to the other two Rich high schools Central and South.
- Crete-Monee School District 201U

=== Schools ===
- 21st Century Primary Center
- Michelle Obama School Of Technology And The Arts (Middle School)
- Blackhawk Primary Center
- Mohawk Primary Center
- Illinois School
- Indiana School
- Talala Elementary Center
- Algonquin Pre-Kindergarten Center
- Illinois Montessori Children's House-Closed
- South Suburban Sda Christian School
- Rich Township High School
  - Rich East High School
  - Rich South High School
  - Rich Central High School

== Transportation ==
Metra operates commuter railroad service to downtown Chicago. Stations bordering Park Forest include Richton Park (Sauk Trail at Governor's Hwy./Crawford Ave./Pulaski Rd.,) 211th Street/Lincoln Highway and Matteson stations on the Metra Electric District, which runs parallel to the Illinois Central Railroad Company (owned by Canadian National Railway Company) but on its own closely adjacent tracks.

Pace provides bus service on multiple routes connecting Park Forest to destinations throughout the Southland.

== See also ==
- Sauk Trail Woods
- Thorn Creek
- Matteson, Illinois
- Richton Park, Illinois
