= University Park, Illinois =

University Park
- Village
- Seal

- Location of University Park in Will County and Cook County, Illinois.
- Coordinates: 41°26′22″N 87°41′50″W
- Country: United States
- State: Illinois
- Counties: Cook, Will
- Townships: Monee, Crete, Rich
- Incorporated: 1967

Government
  - Type: Council–manager
  - Mayor: Joseph E. Roudez III

Area
  - Total: 10.73 sq mi (27.79 km^{2})
  - Land: 10.73 sq mi (27.78 km^{2})
  - Water: 0.0039 sq mi (0.01 km^{2}) 0%

Population (2020)
  - Total: 7,145
  - Density: 666.1/sq mi (257.18/km^{2})

Standard of living (2007–11)
  - Per capita income: $20,083
  - Median home value: $49,400
- ZIP code(s): 60484, 60478
- Area code(s): 708/464
- Geocode: 76935
- FIPS code: 17-76935
- Website: university-park-il.com

University Park is a village in Will County with a small portion in Cook County in the U.S. state of Illinois. It is a south suburb of Chicago. The village is one of the region's few planned communities; it was developed in the 1960s as Wood Hill, then Park Forest South, and finally University Park. Governors State University was established in the village in 1969. The village population was 7,145 at the 2020 census.

== History ==
In the late 1950s, Woodhill Enterprises purchased land south of Park Forest for a large subdivision. Building began in 1961, but by 1967 Wood Hill had only 240 homes. Residents created a homeowners association, which fostered a community identity.

In 1966, Nathan Manilow, one of the developers of Park Forest, started to purchase land around Wood Hill. Park Forest had been a model for planning in the 1940s, and Lewis Manilow, son of Nathan, formed New Community Enterprises (NCE) to build "a whole new town". Major partners included Illinois Central Industries and United States Gypsum Company.

NCE supported the incorporation of Park Forest South in 1967 with projections for 100,000 residents. Under the federal New Communities Act of 1968, Park Forest South was designated as one of 15 such "new communities". Planning included space for residential, commercial, and industrial development and addressed the needs of education, recreation, and faith communities. Racial integration was a goal from the beginning, and Park Forest South became a leader in support of open housing.

Governors State University opened its doors in 1969. The Illinois Central Railroad made its first commuter extension in 40 years there. As a result, University Park station is the last stop on the Metra Electric District line. The city's initial plan included wooded preserves and recreation areas, building on recreation area set-asides and major land donations by the Manilow organization.

The creativity and energy of the developers and village leadership led to great hopes for their "whole new town". In 1970, the state of Illinois allocated $24 million for the GSU campus. In 1971, HUD guaranteed $30 million in loans to bring the vision to reality.

The developers modernized the water and sewage treatment facilities and in 1970 initiated the first elementary school, the first apartment complex, and Governors Gateway Industrial Park.

However, difficulties arose in the economy, in the requirements and lack of resources from HUD, in the projections for growth, and in other areas, leading to suspended development in late 1974. For over two years, intense activity at public and private levels untangled many of the problems. The new town, intended for 100,000, adapted to a slow-growth plan anticipating an eventual 20,000 to 25,000 residents. The 2000 population, however, was 6,662, up slightly from the previous decade.

New town planning remains evident. The industrial park next to Interstate 57 is integral to the village, and residential areas continue to offer open space, bikeways, and additional development. The new town heritage includes the Nathan Manilow Sculpture Park, a monumental internationally recognized outdoor sculpture park at GSU developed by Lewis Manilow to honor his father.

== Geography ==
University Park is located at 41°26′22″N 87°41′50″W (41.439460, -87.697299).

According to the 2021 census gazetteer files, University Park has a total area of 10.73 square miles (27.79 km^{2}), of which 10.73 square miles (27.79 km^{2}) (or 99.98%) is land and 0.00 square miles (0.00 km^{2}) (or 0.02%) is water. The village lies on the Valparaiso Moraine, which is also part of the Saint Lawrence River Divide.

=== Surrounding areas ===
Richton Park
Richton Park Park Forest
Frankfort / Unincorporated Will County Steger / Crete
Unincorporated Will County Unincorporated Will County
Monee / Unincorporated Will County

== Demographics ==
Historical population
Census	Pop.	Note	%±
1970	1,748		—
1980	6,245		257.3%
1990	6,204		−0.7%
2000	6,662		7.4%
2010	7,129		7.0%
2020	7,145		0.2%
U.S. Decennial Census; 2010 2020

=== Racial and ethnic composition ===
University Park, Illinois – Racial and ethnic composition Note: the US Census treats Hispanic/Latino as an ethnic category. This table excludes Latinos from the racial categories and assigns them to a separate category. Hispanics/Latinos may be of any race.
Race / Ethnicity (NH = Non-Hispanic)	Pop 2000	Pop 2010	Pop 2020	% 2000	% 2010	% 2020
White alone (NH)	765	392	346	11.48%	5.50%	4.84%
Black or African American alone (NH)	5,566	6,362	6,199	83.55%	89.24%	86.76%
Native American or Alaska Native alone (NH)	5	6	14	0.08%	0.08%	0.20%
Asian alone (NH)	21	59	18	0.32%	0.83%	0.25%
Native Hawaiian or Pacific Islander alone (NH)	1	1	0	0.02%	0.01%	0.00%
Other race alone (NH)	12	3	49	0.18%	0.04%	0.69%
Mixed race or Multiracial (NH)	172	128	230	2.58%	1.80%	3.22%
Hispanic or Latino (any race)	120	178	289	1.80%	2.50%	4.04%
Total	6,662	7,129	7,145	100.00%	100.00%	100.00%

=== 2020 census ===
As of the 2020 census, University Park had a population of 7,145 and 1,831 families. The median age was 31.1 years. 27.7% of residents were under the age of 18 and 11.5% of residents were 65 years of age or older. For every 100 females there were 80.3 males, and for every 100 females age 18 and over there were 71.1 males age 18 and over.

98.2% of residents lived in urban areas, while 1.8% lived in rural areas.

There were 2,493 households in University Park, of which 39.7% had children under the age of 18 living in them. Of all households, 27.1% were married-couple households, 17.8% were households with a male householder and no spouse or partner present, and 49.5% were households with a female householder and no spouse or partner present. About 27.8% of all households were made up of individuals and 9.6% had someone living alone who was 65 years of age or older.

There were 2,756 housing units at an average density of 256.87 per square mile (99.18/km^{2}), of which 9.5% were vacant. The homeowner vacancy rate was 3.1% and the rental vacancy rate was 8.4%.

=== Income and poverty ===
The median income for a household in the village was $62,258, and the median income for a family was $63,551. Males had a median income of $43,093 versus $31,448 for females. The per capita income for the village was $23,354. About 9.4% of families and 10.3% of the population were below the poverty line, including 13.2% of those under age 18 and 3.2% of those age 65 or over.

== Government ==
University Park is in the Second Congressional District.

== Education ==
The village of University Park falls within the Crete-Monee Community Unit School District 201-U. Coretta Scott King Magnet Elementary and Crete-Monee Middle school is located in the village.

== Transportation ==
University Park is served by a station on the Metra Electric District line, operated by Metra. The Metra Electric line ends at this station; Amtrak services (City of New Orleans, Illini and Saluki) continue south without stoppage. The station also facilitates bus services: Pace route 367 and the River Valley Metro's University Park route.

Pace provides bus service on Route 367 connecting University Park to Park Forest and other destinations.

Stuenkel Road serves as a connector from Interstate 57 to University Park. Illinois Route 50 is another numbered highway running through University Park. Between 1942 and 1971, U.S. Route 54 ran through the area prior to and during the existence of Park Forest South (now University Park).

== Notable people ==
- Amara Enyia (born 1982), political strategist. She was raised in University Park.
- Shonda Rhimes, television producer, screenwriter, and creator, head writer and executive producer of hit television series Grey's Anatomy, Private Practice, Scandal and How to Get Away With Murder, resided in University Park (formerly Park Forest South) as a child.
- Chris Slayton (born 1996), football player. He was a childhood resident of University Park.
