= Olympia Fields, Illinois =

Village in Illinois, United States

- Village
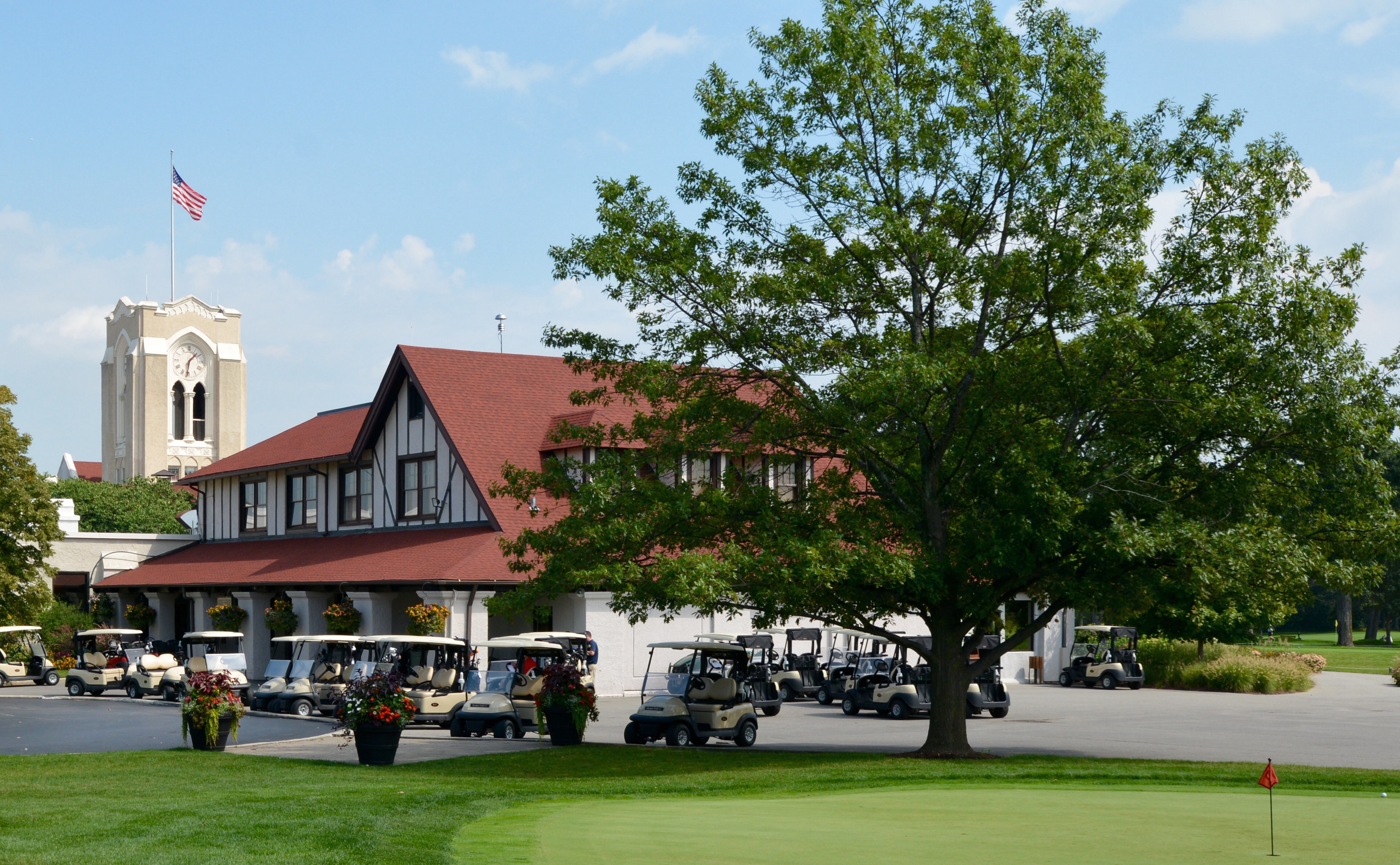
- Olympia Fields Country Club

- Flag Seal
- Motto: Where People Make the Village
- Location of Olympia Fields in Cook County, Illinois.

- Location within Chicago metropolitan area Location within Illinois Location within the United States
- Coordinates: 41°31′6″N 87°41′34″W
- Country: United States
- State: Illinois
- County: Cook
- Township: Bloom, Rich
- Founded: 1927

Government
  - Type: Village
  - Village President: Sterling M. Burke

Area
  - Total: 2.94 sq mi (7.62 km^{2})
  - Land: 2.94 sq mi (7.61 km^{2})
  - Water: 0.0039 sq mi (0.01 km^{2})

Population (2020)
  - Total: 4,718
  - Density: 1,606/sq mi (619.9/km^{2})
- Time zone: UTC-6 (CST)
  - Summer (DST): UTC-5 (CDT)
- ZIP Code(s): 60461
- Area code: 708
- FIPS code: 17-55938
- Wikimedia Commons: Olympia Fields, Illinois
- Website: olympia-fields.com

Olympia Fields is a village in Cook County, Illinois, United States. The population was 4,718 as of the 2020 census. It is a southern suburb of Chicago. The municipality grew up around the prestigious Olympia Fields Country Club, originally established in 1915.

Olympia Fields is noteworthy as one of the wealthiest and best educated, majority African-American communities in the United States. The village's zip code (60461) is one of three majority African American communities which rank among the top five percent in the U.S. for median household income and share of adults with college degrees, and Olympia Fields also has the highest black homeownership rate in the country among majority-black municipalities.

== History ==
The area that comprises the village today was once farmland managed by immigrant families during the 1830s. The Illinois Central Railroad began serving the area in the 1850s, which fostered population and economic growth during that era.

In 1893, the Columbian Exposition opened in Chicago, and southern Cook County became an increasingly popular retreat for busy Chicagoans. By 1913, the area's lush woodlands and rolling terrain convinced a group of investors led by Charles Beach to establish a golf course catering to Chicago's wealthy elite. Beach and his friend James Gardner developed a magnificent 72-hole golf course and country club, chartered in 1915 as Olympia Fields Country Club. Amos Alonzo Stagg, the famed football coach of the University of Chicago, became the club's first president. The name "Olympia" was proposed by Stagg. The word "Fields" was added because it aptly described the young community's pastoral terrain.

In the early 20th century, golf and the resort atmosphere in the area south of Chicago became so popular that some families lived in canvas-covered "cottages" during the summer months, while others built more permanent homes on the western side of the railroad tracks beginning as early as 1919. The clubhouse, built in 1924, is on the National Register of Historic Places. The golf course is considered one of the finest in the nation. It was home to the 1928 and 2003 U.S. Open, the 1925 and 1961 PGA Championship, the 1997 U.S. Senior Open, the 1927, 1933 and 1968 Western Open, the 2015 U.S. Amateur Championship, the 2017 Women's PGA Championship and the 2020 BMW Championship.

The country club's founder, Charles Beach, organized the effort to incorporate the residential areas around the Country Club as a municipality, and in 1927, the Village of Olympia Fields was created with Beach as its first president. His home, built to reflect the design and character of the Country Club, still stands at the southwest corner of Kedzie Avenue and 203rd Street. Today, the grounds of the Country Club remain unincorporated, outside the jurisdiction of the Olympia Fields village government.

Olympia Fields has received the Tree City USA award for many years of having demonstrated a commitment to caring for and managing the village's public trees.

== Geography ==
Olympia Fields is located at 41°31′6″N 87°41′34″W (41.518290, -87.692744).

According to the 2021 census gazetteer files, Olympia Fields has a total area of 2.94 square miles (7.61 km^{2}), of which 2.94 square miles (7.61 km^{2}) (or 99.86%) is land and 0.00 square miles (0.00 km^{2}) (or 0.14%) is water.

== Demographics ==
Historical population
Census	Pop.	Note	%±
1930	143		—
1940	101		−29.4%
1950	160		58.4%
1960	1,503		839.4%
1970	3,478		131.4%
1980	4,146		19.2%
1990	4,248		2.5%
2000	4,732		11.4%
2010	4,988		5.4%
2020	4,718		−5.4%
U.S. Decennial Census; 2010 2020

=== Racial and ethnic composition ===
Olympia Fields, Illinois – Racial and ethnic composition Note: the US Census treats Hispanic/Latino as an ethnic category. This table excludes Latinos from the racial categories and assigns them to a separate category. Hispanics/Latinos may be of any race.
Race / Ethnicity (NH = Non-Hispanic)	Pop 2000	Pop 2010	Pop 2020	% 2000	% 2010	% 2020
White alone (NH)	1,980	1,215	705	41.84%	24.36%	14.94%
Black or African American alone (NH)	2,446	3,436	3,648	51.69%	68.89%	77.32%
Native American or Alaska Native alone (NH)	2	6	2	0.04%	0.12%	0.04%
Asian alone (NH)	160	117	67	3.38%	2.35%	1.42%
Pacific Islander alone (NH)	1	0	0	0.02%	0.00%	0.00%
Other race alone (NH)	11	8	34	0.23%	0.16%	0.72%
Mixed race or Multiracial (NH)	46	79	115	0.97%	1.58%	2.44%
Hispanic or Latino (any race)	86	127	147	1.82%	2.55%	3.12%
Total	4,732	4,988	4,718	100.00%	100.00%	100.00%

=== 2020 census ===
As of the 2020 census, Olympia Fields had a population of 4,718. The population density was 1,603.13 inhabitants per square mile (618.97/km^{2}). The village had 1,929 housing units at an average density of 655.45 per square mile (253.07/km^{2}).

The median age was 55.0 years. 14.5% of residents were under the age of 18 and 33.2% of residents were 65 years of age or older. For every 100 females there were 82.7 males, and for every 100 females age 18 and over there were 80.9 males age 18 and over.

100.0% of residents lived in urban areas, while 0.0% lived in rural areas.

There were 1,764 households in Olympia Fields, of which 24.5% had children under the age of 18 living in them. Of all households, 53.7% were married-couple households, 13.2% were households with a male householder and no spouse or partner present, and 29.8% were households with a female householder and no spouse or partner present. About 24.3% of all households were made up of individuals and 16.3% had someone living alone who was 65 years of age or older.

Of the village's housing units, 8.6% were vacant. The homeowner vacancy rate was 3.5% and the rental vacancy rate was 18.8%.

=== Income and poverty ===
The median income for a household in the village was $93,350, and the median income for a family was $111,458. Males had a median income of $65,609 versus $36,773 for females. The per capita income for the village was $46,882. About 2.1% of families and 7.7% of the population were below the poverty line, including 7.9% of those under age 18 and 12.5% of those age 65 or over.

== Government ==
Olympia Fields is in Illinois's 2nd congressional district. The current president is Sterling M. Burke.

== Transportation ==
The Village of Olympia Fields is located between Vollmer Road and US Route 30 (Lincoln Highway), two miles east of Interstate 57.

Two stations on the Metra Electric Main Line are located in Olympia Fields, providing easy access to the Chicago Loop and the University of Chicago. The Olympia Fields station is located on 203rd St., two blocks east of Kedzie Avenue, in the northern part of the village while the 211th Street (Lincoln Highway) station is in the southern part. Express trains from these stations reach Millennium Station on Michigan Avenue in approximately 40 minutes. Both stations have daily parking facilities.

Pace provides bus service on Route 357 connecting Olympia Fields to destinations across the Southland.

== Education ==
While the majority of the village is served by Arcadia Elementary School in Olympia Fields, a small portion of the village is served by Western Avenue Elementary School in Flossmoor.

Although most of Olympia Fields' students attend Arcadia (K-3) through third grade, school assignments get confusing from there. The Arcadia students head to Indiana School (grades 4–6) in Park Forest, O.W. Huth Middle School (grades 7–8) in Matteson, then back to Olympia Fields for high school. Students from Graymoor and The Greens neighborhoods go to school in Flossmoor. Students who live in the Greens attend Flossmoor schools until eighth grade, then attend Rich Central for High School. Students who live in Graymoor attend Flossmoor schools from kindergarten until twelfth grade. The Wysteria neighborhood students study in Chicago Heights.

Students from Olympia Fields attend six different public school districts: Elementary Districts 161, 162 and 170 and High School Districts 206, 227 and 233.

- Flossmoor School District 161 (Western Avenue Elementary School) encompasses Graymoor and The Greens residents only
- Flossmoor School District 161 (Parker Junior High School) encompasses Graymoor and The Greens residents only
- Homewood-Flossmoor School District 233 (Homewood-Flossmoor High School) for Graymoor residents only. Homewood-Flossmoor High School is a three-time recipient of the U.S. Department of Education's Blue Ribbon Award for excellence. HF also owns WHFH 88.5, the highest powered high school radio station with 1,500 watts.
- Matteson School District 162 (Arcadia and Indiana Elementary Schools) includes all of Olympia Fields, except for Graymoor, Wysteria and the Greens
- Matteson School District 162 (O.W. Huth Middle School) includes all of Olympia Fields, except for Graymoor, Wysteria and the Greens
- Matteson School District 162 (Illinois School) includes all of Olympia Fields, except for Graymoor, Wysteria and the Greens
- Rich Township High School District 227 (Rich Central High School) includes all of Olympia Fields, except for Graymoor and Wysteria.
- Rich Township High School District 227 (Southland College Preparatory Charter High School) includes all of Olympia Fields, except for Graymoor and Wysteria. Southland College Prep was formed in 2010 by Dr. Blondean Y. Davis. Southland College Prep is a public charter school open to any student in grades 9-12 who resides within Rich Township High School District 227. Southland College Prep operates on a European-Asian school model nine-hour school day from 8 a.m. to 5 p.m. five days a week. The college prep curriculum is rigorous with a strong emphasis on math, science, technology, language and fine arts. After-school extra-curricular activities include sports, speech and forensics, band, orchestra, chorus, dance and service projects. Students earn 30 credit hours; eight more than are typically required of traditional high school graduates.
- Chicago Heights School District 170 (Kennedy School) for Wysteria residents only
- Chicago Heights School District 170 (Chicago Heights Middle School) for Wysteria residents only
- Bloom Township High School District 206 (Bloom High School) for Wysteria residents only

Nearby private schools

- Marian Catholic High School is a co-educational, college preparatory 9-12 secondary school in Chicago Heights, Illinois. It is located in the Roman Catholic Archdiocese of Chicago
- Infant Jesus of Prague School is a co-educational, Roman Catholic K-8 school operated by the Infant Jesus of Prague Parish in Flossmoor. IJP, as the school is known, is a two-time winner of the U.S. Department of Education's Blue Ribbon Award.
- Church of the Nazarene Nursery School and Kindergarten is a co-educational, Christian nursery school and kindergarten serving children from ages six weeks to six years during the normal school year and up to the age of twelve years during the summer program.

Colleges and universities

- Prairie State College is a community college in Chicago Heights that offers associate degrees in several areas of study, including liberal arts, business, and vocational training.
- Governors State University is also within a short drive from the village. GSU offers a wide variety of programs and curriculums.
- Other nearby colleges and university include Joliet Junior College, South Suburban College, Trinity Christian College, Lewis University, as well as Chicago's many institutions of higher education.

The METRA train service has two stations in the Village which makes for easy access to many universities located in Chicago. The average commute to downtown Chicago from Olympia Fields is 45 minutes. From there, bus service is available to most locations.

== Notable people ==
- Lou Boudreau, Major League Baseball Hall of Famer, died in Olympia Fields
- Dee Dee Davis, actress and comedian best known for her role as Bryana "Baby Girl" Thomkins on The Bernie Mac Show
- Kendall Gill, retired professional basketball player
- Toi Hutchinson, a Democratic member of the Illinois Senate representing the 40th District
- Rudolph Isley, singer-songwriter and a founding member of The Isley Brothers
- J. Ivy, Grammy Award-winning poet
- R. Kelly, R&B singer-songwriter and producer
- Robert L. Martin, Tuskegee airman, WWII fighter pilot in Europe
- Barbara McKinzie, Alpha Kappa Alpha's 27th international president, 2006–10
- Nnedi Okorafor, a Nigerian-American writer of fantasy, science fiction, and speculative fiction; winner of World Fantasy Award for Best Novel and the Wole Soyinka Prize for African Literature
- Jim Osborne, former defensive tackle for Chicago Bears
