= Napoleon Harris =

American football player and politician (born 1979)

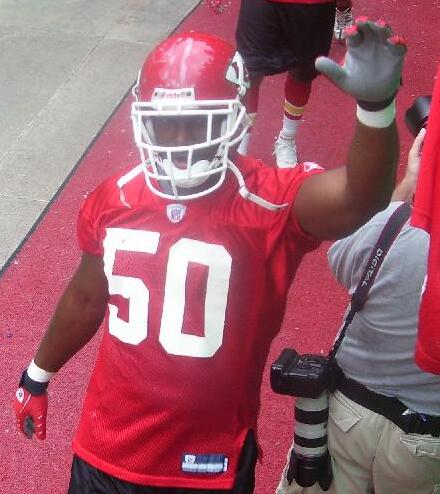
- Harris with the Kansas City Chiefs in 2008

Supervisor of Thornton Township
- Incumbent
- Assumed office May 19, 2025
- Preceded by: Tiffany Henyard

Member of the Illinois Senate from the 15th district
- Incumbent
- Assumed office January 9, 2013
- Preceded by: James T. Meeks

Personal details
- Born: Napoleon Bill Harris III; February 25, 1979 (age 47) Chicago, Illinois, U.S.
- Party: Democratic
- Education: Northwestern University (BA)
- Football career

No. 58, 50, 99
- Position: Linebacker

Personal information
- Listed height: 6 ft 3 in (1.91 m)
- Listed weight: 250 lb (113 kg)

Career information
- High school: Thornton Township (IL)
- College: Northwestern
- NFL draft: 2002: 1st round, 23rd overall pick

Career history
- Oakland Raiders (2002–2004); Minnesota Vikings (2005–2006); Kansas City Chiefs (2007–2008); Minnesota Vikings (2008); Oakland Raiders (2009)*
- * Offseason or practice squad member only

Awards and highlights
- PFWA All-Rookie Team (2002); 2× Second-team All-Big Ten (2000, 2001)

Career NFL statistics
- Total tackles: 484
- Sacks: 8.5
- Forced fumbles: 4
- Fumble recoveries: 1
- Interceptions: 4
- Defensive touchdowns: 1
- Stats at Pro Football Reference

Napoleon Bill Harris III (born February 25, 1979) is an American politician and former professional football player who has been a member of the Illinois Senate representing the 15th district since 2013. The 15th district stretches from Blue Island in the north, Calumet City in the east, Homewood in the west, Steger in the south, and includes all or parts of Crete-Monee, Dolton, Flossmoor, Glenwood, Thornton, Dixmoor, Markham, Midlothian, Oak Forest, Harvey, Riverdale, and South Holland.

Prior to his service in the Illinois Senate, he played as a linebacker for seven seasons in the National Football League (NFL) with the Oakland Raiders, the Minnesota Vikings, and Kansas City Chiefs at various times.

== Early life ==
Harris grew up in Dixmoor, Illinois. He attended Lincoln Elementary School, Rosa L. Parks Middle School, and Thornton Township High School. He was a tri-star athlete and honor student. His father Napoleon Harris Jr. died his junior year of high school. His mother Brenda Faye Bowman Harris, raised Napoleon and his siblings, Tomeika and Jonathan as a single mother. Napoleon was determined to make his family proud and put them in a better position by using his brains and his athletic ability.

Harris was an honors student at Thornton Township High School in Harvey, Illinois and lettered in football and basketball. In football, he posted 23 sacks, 98 tackles, two fumble recoveries, 1 forced fumble, two safeties, and one interception and was named the Defensive Player of the Year by the Chicago Tribune, Chicago Sun-Times, Star Publications, Daily Southtown, and the Hammond Times. Napoleon also averaged 18 points and 10 rebounds on the No. 1 basketball team in the country.

Napoleon Harris earned a Bachelor of Arts degree in Communications from Northwestern University, where he played college football for the Northwestern Wildcats. For one year, he was a two sport athlete playing basketball. His complete college career ranked 11th on Northwestern's all-time tackles list with 334. All-Big Ten Conference as a senior after starting all 11 games at defensive end after moving from outside linebacker and ranked fourth on team in tackles with 78.

== NFL career ==
Pre-draft measurables
Height	Weight	Arm length	Hand span	40-yard dash	10-yard split	20-yard split	20-yard shuttle	Three-cone drill	Vertical jump	Broad jump	Bench press
6 ft 3 in (1.91 m)	253 lb (115 kg)	32 in (0.81 m)	10 in (0.25 m)	4.55 s	1.60 s	2.64 s	4.44 s	7.15 s	34 in (0.86 m)	9 ft 7 in (2.92 m)	27 reps
All measurables were taken at the NFL Scouting Combine; see also scouting report

Harris was selected in the first round of the 2002 draft by the Oakland Raiders, the 23rd overall pick. That year, he started 13 of 16 regular-season games, all three playoff games, and Super Bowl XXXVII for the Oakland Raiders and was named to the Pro Football Weekly All-Rookie team.

In 2005, Harris was acquired by the Minnesota Vikings as part of blockbuster trade which sent Randy Moss to Oakland for the seventh overall pick and a seventh-round pick in the 2005 NFL draft. The Vikings used the picks to select wide receiver Troy Williamson and cornerback Adrian Ward. Despite being traded for one of the premier players in the National Football League, Harris did not immediately live up to his potential the following season with the Minnesota Vikings. In that first season with the Vikings, he was hampered with a lingering knee injury and saw limited playing time. However, in the second season he finished second on the team with 96 tackles, 3 interceptions, 3.5 sacks and 2 fumble recoveries in 14 games.

On March 6, 2007, Harris agreed to a six-year deal with the Kansas City Chiefs. The Chiefs released Harris on October 14, 2008. Just two days after his release from the Chiefs, Harris re-joined the Minnesota Vikings on October 16. Harris started in 5 of the 10 games he played and finished his second stint with the Vikings with 32 tackles and 1 sack, and also scored his first NFL touchdown after returning a fumble 27 yards in week 12 in Jacksonville. Despite a fairly good performance, the Vikings did not hold on to him.

In May 2008, Napoleon appeared on The CW Network series The Game. Harris signed a one-year contract with the Oakland Raiders on August 24, 2009, after the team released cornerback Ricky Manning, but was released five days later.

=== NFL statistics ===
Years	Team	GP	COMB	TOTAL	AST	SACK	FF	FR	FR YDS	INT	IR YDS	AVG IR	LNG IR	TD	PD
2002	OAK	15	81	59	22	0.5	0	0	0	0	0	0	0	0	2
2003	OAK	16	107	74	33	2.0	3	0	0	0	0	0	0	0	2
2004	OAK	14	61	47	14	0.0	0	0	0	0	0	0	0	0	1
2005	MIN	15	25	18	7	1.0	0	0	0	0	0	0	0	0	3
2006	MIN	14	59	42	17	2.5	1	0	0	3	20	7	11	0	4
2007	KC	16	116	82	34	1.5	1	0	0	1	4	4	4	0	3
2008	MIN	10	32	24	8	1.0	0	1	0	0	0	0	0	0	0
Career		100	481	346	135	8.5	5	1	0	4	24	6	11	0	15

Source: ESPN.

== Personal life ==
Harris is married to Nicole M. Bunton Harris with three children. Napoleon Nico Harris IV, Noah Bill Harris and Nahla Nicole Harris. After leaving the NFL, Harris, his wife, and children became the owner of two Beggars Pizza locations.

Napoleon is very active not only in the community but as a father, he coaches basketball for both of his son's AAU teams and also runs drills with his daughter with tennis. His children have his athletic skills as all three of them have won many awards and championships within their respective sports.

Andre Lydell Bunton was the brother-in-law of Senator Napoleon B. Harris III. He was tragically murdered on July 18, 2013, in Chicago’s South Loop neighborhood. At 37 years old, Bunton was sitting in his car when he was shot in the chest. He attempted to drive away but lost control, crashing into two parked vehicles before succumbing to his injuries .

== Illinois Senate (2013–present) ==
In 2011, after Illinois State Senator James Meeks announced his retirement, Harris chose to run to succeed him in the 15th district on a platform of creating economic growth for the district. He won the 2012 primary with a plurality of the vote against two opponents, and ran in the general election unopposed.

In 2024, the Chicago Sun-Times reported on questionable use of senate campaign committee funds by Harris. The Sun-Tiems characterized several of these expenses as appearing to be for personal luxuries. In August 2025, Harris's campaign attorney, Burt Odelson, stated that Harris would reimburse his committee $20,000 for some of these expenditures.

=== Committees ===
As of July 2022, Senator Harris is a member of the following Illinois Senate committees:

- (chairman of) Appropriations – Personnel and Procurement Committee (SAPP-SAPP)
- Appropriations – Revenue and Finance Committee (SAPP-SARF)
- Appropriations – Government Infrastructure Committee (SAPP-SAGI)
- Appropriations Committee (SAPP)
- Commerce Committee (SCOM)
- (Co-chairman of) Critical Energy Infrastructure and Grid Reliability (SENE-ECEI)
- Energy and Public Utilities Committee (SENE)
- Executive Committee (SEXC)
- Executive – Cannabis Committee (SEXC-SEOC)
- (chairman of) Executive – Tobacco Committee (SEXC-STOB)
- Health Committee (SHEA)
- (chairman of) Insurance Committee (SINS)
- Pensions Committee (SPEN)
- (chairman of) Redistricting – South Cook County (SRED)
- Subcommittee on Public Health (SHEA-SHPH)

== 2013 congressional campaign and 2016 U.S. Senate campaign ==
While a member of the Illinois Senate, Harris has run for higher office on two occasions. In 2013, Harris ran for the congressional seat vacated by Jesse Jackson Jr., but dropped out after two months, endorsing Robin Kelly. In 2015, he announced his candidacy in the Democratic primary for U.S. Senate in 2016. He would come in third place, losing to Tammy Duckworth, who would go on to win the general election.

== Democratic Committeeman from Thornton Township (2022–present) ==
After the death of Frank Zuccarelli, the longtime Thornton Township Democratic committeeman, Harris defeated State Representative Thaddeus Jones for the position. The role is a position within the Illinois Democratic Party.

Harris is seeking re-election for the position in 2026. His ballot petition faced an unsuccessful signature challenge by his opponents.

== Thornton Township Supervisor (2025–present) ==
Harris became the Democratic nominee for Thornton Township Supervisor (township executive) after a township Democratic nominating caucus on December 3, 2024, defeating the scandal-plagued incumbent supervisor Tiffany Henyard for the nomination. Harris won the four-way race for township supervisor in the consolidated election on April 1, 2025, with 74% of the vote cast. He was sworn in on May 19, 2025.

He is the first African American elected to the position. While his predecessor (Henyard) was also African American, she had been merely appointed to the position to fill the vacancy caused by the death of Frank Zuccarelli.

Henyard, while supervisor, had enacted an ordinance that would have caused any successor of her's to be paid a $57,000 annual salary instead of the $200,000 she was paid as supervisor. However, before becoming supervisor, House (as a state senator) included a rider in an enacted piece of state legislation which preempted the township ordinance clause that otherwise would have reduced the salary. As a result of House's own rider to state legislation, he has earned a $200,000 salary as supervisor.

== Electoral history ==
=== State Senate ===
Illinois 15th State Senate District Democratic Primary, 2012
Party	Candidate	Votes	%
Democratic	Napoleon Harris	10,172	43.64
Democratic	Donna Miller	8,209	35.22
Democratic	Patricia "Pat" Mahon	4,928	21.14
Total votes		23,309	100

Illinois 15th State Senate General Election, 2012
Party	Candidate	Votes	%
Democratic	Napoleon Harris	73,762	100
Total votes		73,762	100

Illinois 15th State Senate General Election, 2014
Party	Candidate	Votes	%
Democratic	Napoleon Harris (incumbent)	49,577	100
Total votes		49,577	100

Illinois 15th State Senate General Election, 2018
Party	Candidate	Votes	%
Democratic	Napoleon B. Harris III (incumbent)	59,332	100
Total votes		59,332	100

=== Democratic Committeeperson ===
Thornton Township Democratic Committeeperson election
Party	Candidate	Votes	%
Democratic	Napoleon B. Harris III (incumbent)	4,689	30.08
Democratic	Thaddeus Jones	4,648	29.82
Democratic	Terry R. Wells	3,242	20.80
Democratic	Kenneth Williams	2,322	14.90
Democratic	Troy O'Quin	686	4.40
Total votes		15,587	100

=== Township Supervisor ===
2025 Thornton Township Supervisor election
Party	Candidate	Votes	%
Democratic	Napoleon Harris		74.0
Independent	Nate Fields		10.7
Republican	Richard Nolan		10.3
Independent	Christopher J. Clark		4.7
Total votes			100

=== U.S. Senate ===
Illinois U.S. Senator (Class III) Democratic Primary, 2016
Party	Candidate	Votes	%
Democratic	Tammy Duckworth	1,220,128	64.38
Democratic	Andrea Zopp	455,729	24.05
Democratic	Napoleon Harris	219,286	11.57
Total votes		1,895,143	100
