= William Shaw (Illinois politician) =

American politician (1937–2008)

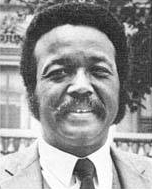
- Official portrait, c. 1983

Mayor of Dolton, Illinois
- In office 1997 – November 26, 2008
- Preceded by: Edward Kipley Jr.
- Succeeded by: Ronnie Lewis

Member of the Illinois Senate from the 15th district
- In office 1993–2003
- Preceded by: Richard F. Kelly
- Succeeded by: James Meeks

Member of the Illinois House of Representatives from the 34th district
- In office 1983–1993
- Preceded by: district created
- Succeeded by: Nancy Kaszak (renumbered)

Personal details
- Born: July 31, 1937 Fulton, Arkansas, U.S.
- Died: November 26, 2008 (aged 71) Dolton, Illinois, U.S.
- Party: Democratic
- Spouse: Shirley
- Children: 4
- Relatives: Robert Shaw (twin brother)

William "Bill" Shaw (July 31, 1937 – November 26, 2008) was an American politician. Shaw is noted as the first African American to serve as mayor of Dolton, Illinois from 1997 until his death in 2008. He also served in the Illinois House of Representatives from 1983 through 1993 and the Illinois State Senate from 1993 through 2003.

For many years, Shaw and his twin brother Robert were dominant political "kingmakers" of Chicago's far South Side and southern suburbs. However, their influence dissipated greatly by the early 2000s, with Jesse Jackson Jr. largely beating them out to become the new kingmaker in what had been their territory. Both Shaw and his twin brother were controversial figures.

== Early life, education, and career ==
Shaw and his identical twin brother (Robert) were born on July 31, 1937 in Fulton, Arkansas. His parents were sharecroppers. He grew up for a number of his early years in Hope, Arkansas, Arkansas. In Hope, his family was neighbors with future U.S. president Bill Clinton. He and his family next moved to St. Louis, Missouri. For high school, Shaw first attended Vashon High School in St. Louis. After ten years in St. Louis, Shaw's family (which had six sibling) relocated to the west side of Chicago, Illinois in 1952. Shaw went on to attended Crane Technical High School, graduating in 1955. After high school, Shaw pursued a short career in boxing.

Shaw and his twin brother became involved in the African American civil rights movement. By the early 1970s, the two brothers had moved to the far South Side of Chicago, believing it to be the best location to establish an African American-led Democratic Party organization. In 1977, Shaw became an assistant to Alderman Wilson Frost of Chicago's 34th Ward. Shaw served as the assistant director of the Illinois Department of Support Services from 1979 until 1982.

== Illinois House of Representatives (1983–1993) ==
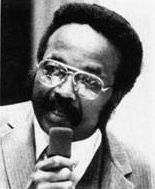
Shaw, circa 1985

Shaw was elected to the Illinois House of Representatives in 1982 to the 34th district. He represented the district until 1993.

In 1984, Shaw and his brother became outspoken proponents for the passage of legislation make black history required curriculum in Illinois public schools.

=== Committee assignments as state representative ===
During his time in the state house, Shaw was assigned to the following standing committees:

- Aeronautics (1989–990) served as chairman (1989–1990)
- Constitutional Officers (1991–92) served as chairman (1991–1992)
- Appropriations I (1983–1990)
- Executive (1983–1986)/ Executive and Veteran Affairs (1987–1988)
- Financial Institutions (1987–1992) served as vice-chairman (1987–1992)
- Higher Education (1983–86)
- Insurance (1987–1992) served as chairman (1987–88)
- Labor and commerce (1983–1990)
- Registration and Regulation (1987–1992)

During his time in the state house, Shaw was also assigned to the following special committees:

- Local School District Reorganization (1985–86)
- World's Fair 1992 (1985–86)

== Illinois State Senate (1993–2003) ==
After the 1991 decennial redistricting, Shaw opted to challenge Democratic incumbent Richard F. Kelly for the 15th Senate district in 1992. Shaw won the primary by approximately 2,000 votes. Shaw served for a decade until losing election to James T. Meeks in 2002. Meeks had been encouraged to run by the Shaw Brothers' political rival, Jesse Jackson Jr.

For years in the Illinois General Assembly, Shaw advocated for the passage of legislation to mandate that the curriculum of Illinois public schools include the teaching of African American history. Legislation co-sponsored by him on this was passed while he in the state senate. Shaw also co-sponsored legislation to create the Illinois organ donor program in the secretary of state's office.

In 1999, Shaw assumed a leadership role, becoming one of several assistant minority leaders, serving under minority leader Emil Jones. In 2001, he traded this position for deputy minority caucus whip, under minority caucus whip Debbie Halvorson.

After his 2002 loss for reelection to the state senate, lame duck governor George Ryan (a Republican) named Shaw to the position of Small Business Utility Advocate for a term that would have started March 1, 2003. The position's mandate was to protect and promote the interests of small business utility customers; provide information and assistance regarding utility conservation measures; notify small business community regarding proceedings before state and federal regulatory commissions and courts. The position required confirmation by the Illinois Senate. Ultimately, in February 2003, Governor Rod Blagojevich (a Democrat) chose not to put anyone forward for the position as a cost saving measure.

=== Committee assignments as state senator ===
While a state senator, Shaw was assigned to the following committees:

- Agriculture & Conservation (1995–1996)
- Environment & Energy (1993–2002)
- Executive (1993–1994)
- Licensed Activities (2001–02)
- Local Government & Elections (1997–99)/ Local Government (1999–2002)
- Transportation (1993–1996)

He was also assigned to the following joint committees:

- Legislative Reference Bureau (1995–2002) served as co-chair (1997–2002)
- Legislative Research Unit (1993–2002)

== Mayor of Dolton, Illinois (1997–2008) ==
Shaw was elected mayor of Dolton, Illinois in April 1997, becoming the city's first black mayor. He succeeded Donald Hart, who had not sought reelection. Shaw served five terms as mayor until his death on November 26, 2008. After Shaw's death, Ronnie Lewis was named by the village board of trustees (city council) to serve as interim mayor.

Soon after taking office, Shaw proposed the idea of using retired police officers as marshals to be deployed in emergencies or if gang violence in the village increased. The village board of trustees approved a resolution for this in a 4-2 vote on May 19, 1997.

In 2005, the Village of Dolton filed a lawsuit against a taser manufacturer alleging that it had not sufficiently tested a product it marketed as being nonlethal.

In 2006, Shaw appointed his brother Robert to the newly created position of Dolton inspector general, which paid $70,000 annually. This move angered some in the village, who saw it as blatant nepotism. The Better Government Association criticized this as a, "$70,000 joke on the taxpayers of Dolton".

In 2006, the village's former police chief sued the village, alleging that Shaw had fired him for trying to expose corruption within the police force. In 2010, a lawsuit against the Village of Dolton alleged that, in 2007, Shaw had rigged the results of a police sergeant's exam in order to favor two officers for promotion.

== Political kingmaker ==
For more than a quarter century, Shaw and his brother Robert were dominant political "kingmakers" of Chicago's far South Side and southern suburbs. They built a political machine that garnered the support of the African American electorate in the area. Over the years, their main rivals for influence there was the Jackson family, Jesse Jackson and Jesse Jackson Jr. Their influence dissipated greatly in the late 1990s and the early 2000s, with Jesse Jackson Jr. largely beating them out to become the new kingmaker at the time. Their tide first began to change when Jesse Jackson Jr. won election to U.S. congress in 1996, defeating the Shaw brothers-backed candidate Emil Jones in the Democratic primary. In 1999, Jackson Jr. successfully backed Anthony Beale against Robert Shaw's son Herbert Shaw in the race to succeed Robert Shaw as 9th Ward Chicago alderman. In 2000, Jackson Jr. backed David E. Miller in his successful state representative Democratic primary race against Shaw-backed candidate Willis Harris. In 2002, Jackson Jr. had encouraged James Meeks to make his successful general election challenge to Shaw for state senate. Jackson accused the Shaw brothers, that same year, of being behind the dummy candidate campaign of a retired truck driver named Jesse L. Jackson against him for congress. In 2004, Jackson backed Larry Rogers Jr.'s successful primary challenge against Robert Shaw for Cook County Board of Review. Also in 2004, the Shaw brothers denied involvement with two challengers running against Jackson for congress, who each filed challenges to the younger Jackson's petition signatures (which, if successful, would have seen Jackson removed from the ballot in the Democratic primary). The two challengers to Jackson worked for Dolton (where Shaw was mayor), and used the village's attorney as their lawyer. As mayor, Shaw utilized the trappings of his office to attack political enemies. By 2006, the Shaw brothers were using a public-access television program in Dolton to regularly assail Jesse Jackson Jr. and other political foes.

From 1988 until 1996, Shaw served as Democratic committeeman for Chicago's 9th ward, an elected Democratic Party position. In 1996, Shaw's brother, Robert, succeeded him as 9th ward committeeman. However, he would only hold the office for a single term, being unseated in 2000 by Anthony Beale, an ally of Jesse Jackson Jr. In the years that the Shaw brothers ran the 9th Ward Regular Democratic Organization, they and their campaign volunteers helped deliver strong voter support for campaigns of African American politicians such as Mayor Harold Washington and Illinois State Senator Emil Jones, and the 1992 U.S. Senate campaign of Carol Moseley Braun. They also helped mobilize support in the area for the 2004 U.S. Senate campaign of Barack Obama. During his period of political influence, many politicians sought Shaw's support.

In 1997, the same day that Shaw first won election as Dolton mayor, his son Victor lost his campaign for mayor of Riverdale, Illinois.

In 2002, Shaw ran for Democratic committeeman for Thornton Township, challenging Frank Giglio (who had served as committeeman for 29 years). Also challenging Giglio was Frank Zuccarelli, the superintendent of the township. At the time, the township's Democratic Party had fractured into three camps: those loyal to Shaw, those loyal to Giglio, and those loyal to Zuccarelli. Shaw and Zuccarelli remained friendly, which led to some speculation that they had both run in order to split the vote away from Giglio so that one of them would beat him. They both denied that that was the case. Zuccarelli won, while Shaw placed second.

Among the individuals that got their starts in the political organization run by the Shaw brothers was Mose Jefferson.

In 2022, after Robert Shaw's death, The Chicago Crusader credited the Shaw brothers' political organization with successfully pushing the Illinois State Legislature to establish new Cook County Circuit Court and Illinois Appellate Court sub-circuits located in African American city wards, which The Chicago Crusader wrote had the impact of enabling more than 60 African American individuals to become judges.

== Personal and death ==
Shaw was married to Shirley Shaw, and had four children. Shaw died of colon cancer at his home in Dolton, Illinois at age 71. His battle against his cancer had been four-years long.

At the peak of their political careers, Shaw and his brother were recognizable-looking for both wearing similar hairpieces.

== Electoral history ==
=== State House ===
1982

1982 Illinois House of Representatives 34th District Democratic primary
| Party | Candidate | Votes | % |
|---|---|---|---|
| Democratic | William "Bill" Shaw | 9,001 | 99.93 |
| Write-in | others | 6 | 0.07 |
| Total votes | | 9,007 | 100 |

1982 Illinois House of Representatives 34th District election
| Party | Candidate | Votes | % |
|---|---|---|---|
| Democratic | William "Bill" Shaw | 22,613 | 75.23 |
| Republican | James F. Stieman | 4,249 | 14.14 |
| Citizens for Progressive Candidates | James "Jim" Owens | 3,197 | 10.64 |
| Total votes | | 30,059 | 100 |

1984

1984 Illinois House of Representatives 34th District Democratic primary
| Party | Candidate | Votes | % |
|---|---|---|---|
| Democratic | William "Bill" Shaw (incumbent) | 8,251 | 44.55 |
| Democratic | David E. Jackson | 4,123 | 22.26 |
| Democratic | James "Jim" Owens | 3,079 | 16.63 |
| Democratic | Richard John Dowdell | 1,630 | 8.80 |
| Democratic | Robert Anderson | 903 | 4.88 |
| Democratic | Bobbie Ray Wilson | 533 | 2.88 |
| Total votes | | 18,519 | 100 |

1984 Illinois House of Representatives 34th District election
| Party | Candidate | Votes | % |
|---|---|---|---|
| Democratic | William "Bill" Shaw (incumbent) | 27,843 | 83.26 |
| Republican | Daniel M. Stacey | 5,600 | 16.74 |
| Total votes | | 33,443 | 100 |

1986

1986 Illinois House of Representatives 34th District Democratic primary
| Party | Candidate | Votes | % |
|---|---|---|---|
| Democratic | William "Bill" Shaw (incumbent) | 7,455 | 62.51 |
| Democratic | Richard John Dowdell | 3,058 | 25.64 |
| Democratic | Edward Robinson, Jr. | 1,413 | 11.85 |
| Total votes | | 11,926 | 100 |

1986 Illinois House of Representatives 34th District election
| Party | Candidate | Votes | % |
|---|---|---|---|
| Democratic | William "Bill" Shaw (incumbent) | 19,512 | 84.57 |
| Republican | Robert H. Anderson | 3,558 | 15.42 |
| Total votes | | 23,070 | 100 |

1988

1988 Illinois House of Representatives 34th District Democratic primary
| Party | Candidate | Votes | % |
|---|---|---|---|
| Democratic | William "Bill" Shaw (incumbent) | 10,475 | 49.46 |
| Democratic | Cheryl L. Lavender | 6,659 | 31.44 |
| Democratic | Hazel M. Johnson | 3,137 | 14.81 |
| Democratic | Leah M. Jowers | 904 | 4.26 |
| Total votes | | | 100 |

1988 Illinois House of Representatives 34th District election
| Party | Candidate | Votes | % |
|---|---|---|---|
| Democratic | William "Bill" Shaw (incumbent) | 27,274 | 85.48 |
| Republican | Ronald L. Whorle | 4,630 | 14.51 |
| Total votes | | 31,904 | 100 |

1990

1990 Illinois House of Representatives 34th District Democratic primary
| Party | Candidate | Votes | % |
|---|---|---|---|
| Democratic | William "Bill" Shaw (incumbent) | 9,847 | 62.56 |
| Democratic | Cora L. McGruder | 3,580 | 22.74 |
| Democratic | Hosea Jones | 2,312 | 14.68 |
| Total votes | | 15,739 | 100 |

1990 Illinois House of Representatives 34th District election
| Party | Candidate | Votes | % |
|---|---|---|---|
| Democratic | William "Bill" Shaw (incumbent) | 16,174 | 100 |
| Total votes | | 16,174 | 100 |

=== State Senate ===
1992

1992 Illinois Senate 15th District Democratic primary
| Party | Candidate | Votes | % |
|---|---|---|---|
| Democratic | William "Bill" Shaw | 14,790 | 49.78 |
| Democratic | Richard F. Kelly (incumbent) | 12,473 | 41.98 |
| Democratic | Hosea Jones | 2,445 | 8.23 |
| Total votes | | 29,708 | 100 |

1992 Illinois Senate 15th District election
| Party | Candidate | Votes | % |
|---|---|---|---|
| Democratic | William "Bill" Shaw | 57,643 | 82.45 |
| Republican | Eugene James | 12,264 | 17.54 |
| Total votes | | 69,907 | 100 |

1996

1996 Illinois Senate 15th District Democratic primary
| Party | Candidate | Votes | % |
|---|---|---|---|
| Democratic | William "Bill" Shaw (incumbent) | 15,978 | 100 |
| Total votes | | 15,978 | 100 |

1996 Illinois Senate 15th District election
| Party | Candidate | Votes | % |
|---|---|---|---|
| Democratic | William "Bill" Shaw (incumbent) | 52,208 | 88.35 |
| Republican | Eugene James | 6,884 | 11.64 |
| Total votes | | 59,092 | 100 |

2000

2000 Illinois Senate 15th District Democratic primary
| Party | Candidate | Votes | % |
|---|---|---|---|
| Democratic | William "Bill" Shaw (incumbent) | 16,974 | 100 |
| Total votes | | 16,974 | 100 |

2000 Illinois Senate 15th District election
| Party | Candidate | Votes | % |
|---|---|---|---|
| Democratic | William "Bill" Shaw (incumbent) | 57,621 | 100 |
| Total votes | | 57,621 | 100 |

2002

2002 Illinois Senate 15th District Democratic primary
| Party | Candidate | Votes | % |
|---|---|---|---|
| Democratic | William "Bill" Shaw (incumbent) | 16,643 | 51.53 |
| Democratic | Nicholas E. Graves | 15,653 | 48.47 |
| Total votes | | 32,296 | 100 |

2002 Illinois Senate 15th District election
| Party | Candidate | Votes | % |
|---|---|---|---|
| Honesty & Integrity | James T. Meeks | 22,434 | 40.05 |
| Democratic | William "Bill" Shaw (incumbent) | 20,176 | 36.02 |
| Republican | Philip R. Arnold, Jr. | 13,398 | 23.92 |
| Total votes | | 56,008 | 100 |

=== Mayor of Dolton ===
1997

1997 Dolton Concerned Party mayoral primary
| Party | Candidate | Votes | % |
|---|---|---|---|
| Dolton Concerned Party | William "Bill" Shaw | 1,899 | 55.51 |
| Dolton Concerned Party | Mariellyn Herzog | 1,522 | 44.48 |
| Total votes | | 3,421 | 100 |

1997 Dolton mayoral election
| Party | Candidate | Votes | % |
|---|---|---|---|
| Dolton Concerned Party | William "Bill" Shaw | 2,684 | 49.10 |
| | Bert Herzog | 2,460 | 45.01 |
| Independent | Sharyn Wiley | 322 | 5.89 |
| Total votes | | 5,466 | 100 |

2001

2001 Dolton mayoral election
| Party | Candidate | Votes | % |
|---|---|---|---|
| Dolton Concerned Party | William "Bill" Shaw | 1,855 | 100 |
| Total votes | | 1,855 | 100 |

2005

2005 Dolton mayoral election
| Party | Candidate | Votes | % |
|---|---|---|---|
| Dolton Concerned Party | William "Bill" Shaw (incumbent) | 2,095 | 47.59 |
| PRP | Robert "Bob" Watson | 1,902 | 43.21 |
| Independent | Ollie Carter, Jr. | 303 | 6.88 |
| Independent | Phil Trotter | 41 | 0.93 |
| Independent | Crystal R. Bennett | 61 | 1.39 |
| Total votes | | 4,402 | 100 |

=== Democratic Committeeman (9th ward) ===
1988 9th Ward Democratic Committeeman election
| Party | Candidate | Votes | % |
|---|---|---|---|
| Democratic | William "Bill" Shaw | 6,560 | 52.60 |
| Democratic | Salim Al-Nurridin | 5,912 | 47.40 |
| Total votes | | 12,472 | 100 |

1992 9th Ward Democratic Committeeman election
| Party | Candidate | Votes | % |
|---|---|---|---|
| Democratic | William "Bill" Shaw (incumbent) | 5,427 | 57.47 |
| Democratic | Johnny J. O'Neal | 4,066 | 42.53 |
| Total votes | | 9,493 | 100 |

=== Democratic Committeeman (Thornton township) ===
2002 Thornton Democratic Committeeman election
| Party | Candidate | Votes | % |
|---|---|---|---|
| Democratic | Frank Zuccarelli | 12,880 | 46.63 |
| Democratic | William "Bill" Shaw | 9,691 | 35.08 |
| Democratic | Frank Giglio (incumbent) | 5,051 | 18.29 |
| Total votes | | 27,622 | 100 |
