= Toi Hutchinson =

American politician

Senior Advisor to the Governor for Cannabis Control
- Incumbent
- Assumed office September 26, 2019
- Governor: J. B. Pritzker
- Preceded by: Position established

President of the National Conference of State Legislatures
- In office 2018–2019
- Preceded by: Deb Peters
- Succeeded by: Robin Vos

Member of the Illinois Senate from the 40th district
- In office January 5, 2009 – November 3, 2019
- Preceded by: Debbie Halvorson
- Succeeded by: Patrick Joyce

Personal details
- Born: May 20, 1973 (age 53)
- Party: Democratic
- Education: University of Illinois Urbana-Champaign (BA); Northern Illinois University (JD)

Toi Hutchinson (born May 20, 1973) is an American politician serving as the Illinois Cannabis Regulation Oversight Officer since 2019. A member of the Democratic Party, she served in the Illinois Senate from 2009 to 2019.

== Early life and education ==
At nine years old, Hutchinson moved to Country Club Hills, Illinois, where she was raised by her mother and maternal grandparents. She attended Infant Jesus of Prague elementary school in Flossmoor, and Rich Central High School in Olympia Fields. At the University of Illinois Urbana-Champaign, she earned a Bachelor of Arts degree, majoring in English and minoring in psychology. Hutchinson returned to her old high school as an English teacher. She graduated from Northern Illinois University's College of Law in 2014.

== Career ==
Hutchinson has worked on behalf of the State Alliance of YMCAs and for the Chicago Southland Chamber of Commerce's Government Affairs Council. In 2004, she became an Executive Management Fellow in the Women and Leadership program created by Harva Kennedy School. That same year, Hutchinson ran unsuccessfully for Supervisor of Bloom Township. The day after that election, she accepted a position on the staff of Debbie Halvorson. Hutchinson eventually became Halvorson's Chief of Staff.

Hutchinson was appointed in January 2009 to complete the rest of Debbie Halvorson's term following Halvorson's 2008 election to the United States House of Representatives. During her tenure, Hutchinson served on the Agriculture and Conservation, Labor, Local Government, Veteran Affairs, and Transportation committee.

Hutchinson served as president of the National Conference of State Legislatures from 2018 to 2019.

Hutchinson left the Illinois Senate in 2019, and Patrick Joyce was appointed by local party leaders in the 40th district to succeed her.

Hutchinson was appointed president and CEO of the Marijuana Policy Project in December 2021.

=== 2013 congressional special election ===
After Jesse Jackson Jr. resigned from the United States House of Representatives after being investigated for the misuse campaign funds, Hutchinson announced her intent to run in the 2013 special election succeed him. She was endorsed by Cook County Board President Toni Preckwinkle, and Illinois State Representatives Anthony DeLuca, Lisa Dugan, Al Riley, and Thaddeus Jones. She was also endorsed by the mayors of Flossmoor and Kankakee, Illinois. In the Democratic primary, Hutchinson came in fifth place out of 16 candidates. Robin Kelly was eventually elected.

=== Cannabis czar ===
On September 26, 2019, it was announced that Governor J. B. Pritzker appointed Hutchinson Illinois Cannabis Regulation Oversight Officer, a role created by the Illinois Cannabis Regulation and Tax Act, to oversee the roll out of the statewide legalization of recreational cannabis. Hutchinson will oversee relevant activities of multiple agencies including the Department of Agriculture, the Department of Public Health, Department of Revenue, Department of Commerce and Economic Opportunity, and the Department of Financial and Professional Regulation. She will also have input over the policies of the Illinois State Police.

== Personal life ==
She is married to Paul Hutchinson, a senior systems engineer. They reside in Olympia Fields with their three children.
