= Frank Zuccarelli =

American politician

Supervisor of Thornton Township
- In office May 3, 1993 – January 3, 2022
- Preceded by: Fred R. Redell
- Succeeded by: Tiffany Henyard

Chairman of the South Suburban College Board of Trustees
- In office 1987–2022
- Preceded by: Rita Page
- Succeeded by: Terry Wells

Member of the South Suburban College Board of Trustees
- In office 1978–2022
- Preceded by: Damon Rockett
- Succeeded by: Prince Reed

Student member of the South Suburban College Board of Trustees
- In office 1976
- Preceded by: office established

Personal details
- Born: October 29, 1951 Chicago, Illinois, U.S.
- Died: January 3, 2022 (aged 70)
- Party: Democratic Party
- Education: South Suburban College; Governors State University

Frank M. Zuccarelli (October 29, 1951 – January 3, 2022) was an American politician who served as the longtime supervisor (executive) of Thornton Township in Cook County, Illinois. He was also the longtime chairman of the South Suburban College Board of Trustees. Zuccarelli was also a Democratic Party powerbroker in Cook County politics, and served for two decades as the Democratic committeeman for Thornton Township.

== Early life, education, and career ==
Zuccarelli was born on October 29, 1951 in Chicago, the son of James J. and Marjorie Zuccarelli. He had two brothers and a sister. He attended Mendel Catholic High School until his family moved to South Holland, Illinois in 1967. After moving to South Holland, he began attending Thornridge High School, where he graduated high school.

From 1969 until 1972, Zuccarelli served in the United States Air Force as a medic in the Vietnam War. He was an enlisted Airman.

In 1974, Zuccarelli enrolled at Thornton Community College (TCC; now South Suburban College). He graduated in 1976 with an associates degree in science. He graduated again with an associate of arts degree in 1978. He served as a veterans' benefit counselor while at TCC. Around this time, he began his involvement with a number of civic organizations. He served as vice president of the board of directors of the substance abuse rehabilitation program Foundation I. He would serve on its board for nine years. the Thornton Township Youth Committee, and Disabled American Veterans. He would serve on the board of the Thornton Township Youth Committee for sixteen years. He also involved himself in Young Democrats. Frank Giglio, the Democratic committeeman of Thornton Township mentored him.

Zuccarelli subsequently earned a bachelor's degree at Governors State University.

== South Suburban College Board of Trustees (1978–2022) ==
For 43 years, Zuccarelli served on the board of trustees for South Suburban College, which was earlier in his tenure known as Thornton Community College.

Before being publicly elected to the board in 1978, he had first served on it in 1976 in the then-newly-created student trustee position. As a student trustee, he supported a teachers strike for higher teachers pensions. As a publicly elected trustee, he won eight terms.

=== First and second terms ===
For decades, Zuccarelli served on the board of trustees for South Suburban College (previously named "Thornton Community College"). Zuccarelli was elected to the board of trustees in 1978. A recent graduate of the community college himself, Zuccarelli argued in his campaign that he had a, "very thorough knowledge of the problems that students at Thornton Community College encounter, both in and out of the classroom." He also pledged to advocate for a lower tuition.

In the 1985 board of trustees election, the two candidates backed by Zuccarelli defeated four other candidates. His own seat was not up for election that year.

After Robert Anderson stepped down as the board's chair late-1985, Zuccarelli sought to become his successor. He was one of two candidates nominated for consideration by the board. However, Rita Page defeated him in a 4–3 November vote.

In 1987, the editorial board of The Star described Zuccarelli as, "one of the more contentious trustees, furthering the image of strife on the board," and accused him of playing partisan Democratic politics on the ostensively nonpartisan board in consort with township Democratic leadership.

In 1987 board election in which he was up for re-election, Zuccarelli organized a slate of two other candidates that he jointly ran with in the multi-member election. One of the members of the slate was Harold Murphy, a former Markham, Illinois alderman who had run an unsuccessful 1985 write-in campaign for mayor. The other member was Carol Kruszynski-Koch, a political newcomer. The entirety of the slate was elected. In a surprise, Kruszynski-Koch received more votes than Zuccarelli. The slate all agreed on raising the property tax rate to address the college's then-$1 million deficit and to work with the state on finding alternate revenue sources to fund the college. The members of the slate also all supported the potential adoption of affirmative action, though they differed on how the college might implement it.

=== Chairmanship (1987–2022) ===
Zuccarelli became the board's chairman in 1987, a position he held for 34 years, until his death in 2022. The year after he became its chairman, the college was renamed to "South Suburban College".

In 1991, Zuccarelli faced accusations of using his influence to get a political ally appointed to a position at the college.

In 1993, Zuccarelli again ran with a slate. He and the other two candidates in the multi-member election for full terms (political newcomer Pat Wojicikowski and incumbent appointed trustee Louis Toney) won election against another challenger. Kathleen Meunier, an incumbent appointee that Zuccarelli had endorsed for election, won a coinciding special election for the unexpired term of the seat she had been appointed to.

Zuccarelli played a key role in securing the college $36 million in funding from the Rebuild Illinois program to fund the construction of a new 130,000 square foot healthcare teaching facility.

After his January 2022 death in office, the board of trustees voted to name Terry Wells (a longtime board member who is also the mayor of Phoenix, Illinois) as its new chairman. The board also appointed South Holland village trustee Prince Reed to fill Zuccarelli's board seat.

== Thornton Township Supervisor (1993–2022) ==
In 1993, Zuccarelli was elected the supervisor (executive) of Thornton Township in Cook County, Illinois. He would hold this office until his death in 2022.

Zuccarelli, in part, described his view of the role of the township government as being, "advocates for the people". In 2019, the town had a sizable budget of $35 million. It, at the end of Zuccarelli's tenure, had 170 full-time and part-time employees. Zuccarelli was regarded to be the boss of a political machine in Thornton Township, and was criticized for his use of patronage. He dubbed his political allies the "Z Team".

=== Elections ===
Zuccarelli won election to ten four-year terms as supervisor.

In 1993, Zuccarrelli challenged two-term incumbent supervisor Fred R. Redell in the Democratic primary. Redell had come into conflict with the Democratic Committeeman Frank Giglio, and Zuccarelli township's Democratic Party organization slated Zuccarelli instead of Redell as its endorsed candidate for voters to support in the primary. Zuccarelli was an ally of Giglio's at the time, and was regarded to be Giglio's political mentee. No longer supported by the county organization, Redell ran jointly with other candidates on a slate that was independent of party apparatus support. The campaign between the two was described as contentious. Zuccarelli won the primary 51% to 49%. After winning the general election, Zuccarelli was sworn-in on May 3, 1993.

In his 2001 re-election for a third term, Zuccarelli faced a primary election challenge from Giglio, with whom his relationship had soured. After an ugly campaign, Zuccarelli prevailed.

Zuccarrelli, who was white, retained strong popularity with township voters even as the township demographically shifted into an overwhelmingly African American area.

=== Assistance programs and tax rebates ===
Thornton Townships contains several of Illinois' most impoverished communities. Zuccarelli implemented many public assistance programs to help poor residents of the township.

Zuccarelli opened a senior center which distributes lunches to seniors from thirteen different locations in the township, and also offers blood pressure services. Under him, the township also hosted events for senior citizens. The township began also offerings seniors free transportation for medical, grocery, and shopping trips. It also opened a Youth and Family Services building in Riverdale, Illinois to provide services for younger residents. Zuccarelli is also credited for the opening and operating a large food pantry in Harvey, Illinois.

Zuccarelli is credited with the establishment of a STEM summer camp for elementary and middle school students which is hosted on the campus of South Suburban College. Zuccarelli also created the Zuccarelli Assistance Program (ZAP) which gave teenagers above the age of sixteen summer jobs mowing the lawns of senior citizens.

During Zuccarelli's tenure as supervisor, the township numerous times offered special tax rebates to residents. These were credited as returning $5 million of paid property taxes back to homeowners.

=== Salary ===
In 2017, Zuccarelli's salary was increased from $173,907 to $223,606. Earning roughly $224,000 in his later years in office, he was one of the highest-salaried public employees in Illinois. His salary was higher than that of the governor of Illinois, as well as the governors of all but one other U.S. states.

=== Spending ===
Critics also accused Zuccarelli of being wasteful with township resources. For instance, he spent in excess of $106,000 on an advertising campaign to persuade Nobel Peace Prize voters to give the award to the Emanuel African Methodist Episcopal Church after it was the site of a 2015 mass shooting. He also spent $46,00 on a four-day trip to South Carolina by himself and a party of fourteen. He claimed the trip was to learn why South Carolina community had reacted differently to that shooting than Ferguson, Missouri and Baltimore, Maryland had to then-recent police-involved killings of African Americans.

In 2019, the Chicago Tribune reported that records showed that the township had paid in excess of $611,000 to two companies led by an individual who had ties to Zuccarelli-related political committees

=== Succession ===
After his death in office, the township board had 60 days to choice a successor. After 60 days, the decision would have been ceded by the board to a town-hall-style meeting of township electors. After a contentious process, the board chose Dolton, Illinois mayor Tiffany Henyard ten minutes before the 60-day deadline would have been reached. Henyard was chosen over eight other individuals nominated for the position.

== Role as a political powerbroker ==
Zuccarelli established himself as an influential individual in the politics of Cook County, Illinois, being considered a powerbroker in its Democratic politics. He was regarded to be the boss of a political machine in Thornton Township. Some area politicians openly cited Zuccarelli as a mentor, including Dolton Mayor Tiffany Henyard (who later succeeded him as township supervisor); as well as Calumet City Mayor and State Rep. Thaddeus Jones.

An early example of Zuccarelli's success in endorsing candidates for other offices came in 1990, when all of his endorsed candidates for Dolton School District 149 were elected.

Zuccarelli endorsed the successful 2004 U.S. Senate campaign of Barack Obama ahead of the Democratic primary. This separated him from much of the Democratic establishment leaders, who had instead backed Daniel Hynes' candidacy. Obama later campaigned on behalf of Zuccarelli and spoke positively of the Democratic organization that he headed. Ahead of the Democratic primary for the 2016 Cook County State's Attorney election, Zuccarelli endorsed Kim Foxx's successful challenge to incumbent Democrat Anita Alvarez.

=== Thornton Township Democratic Committeeman ===
In 2002, Zuccarelli was elected as the Democratic Party committeeman for Thornton Township, unseating Giglio, who had served as committeeman for 29 years. Also challenging Giglio was William Shaw, the mayor of Dolton, Illinois. At the time, the township's Democratic Party had fractured into three camps: those loyal to Zuccarelli, those loyal to Giglio, and those loyal to Shaw. Zuccarelli and Shaw remained friendly, which led to some speculation that they had both run in order to split the vote away from Giglio so that one of them would beat him. They both denied that that was the case. Zuccrelli campaigned on a promise that he intended to unite the divided township Democratic organization.

In 2022, weeks after Zuccarelli died holding the committeeperson seat, the Thornon Township selected Phoenix, Illinois Mayor Terry Wells (who had succeeded Zuccarelli on the South Suburban College board) as its choice to fill the position. Also competing to be their choice had been State Rep. and Calumet City mayor Thaddeus Jones. However, the Cook County Democratic Party decided against filling the position ahead of the regularly scheduled June election.

== Other public offices ==
From 1996 until his death, Zuccarelli served on the Cook County Economic Development Advisory Board. From 2009 until his death, he served on the Cook County Employee Appeals Board.

=== 2013 nomination to the CTA Board ===
On June 7, 2013, Illinois Governor Pat Quinn nominated Zuccarelli to replace John Bouman on the Chicago Transit Authority (CTA) Board. Confirmation was subject to the advice and consent of the Illinois Senate.

William M. Daley, who was challenging Quinn for the Democratic nomination in the 2014 gubernatorial election, took issue with the proposed appointment of Zuccarelli. Noting that Zuccarelli would earn $25,000 of public money from a CTA board position on top of the $128,000 he was already earning as Thornton Supervisor, he accused him of "double dipping" into public salary. A state law prohibited board members from also holding paid jobs for federal, state, county or municipal governments, but (in a loophole) did not make the same stipulation of township jobs. Noting Zuccarelli's political influence, Daley accused Quinn of being motivated by a desire to receive Zuccarelli's political support ahead of the primary. Quinn defended the nomination, arguing that Zuccarelli's appointment would be valuable in providing the southern Chicago suburbs a "strong voice on transit". Ultimately, in mid-August, Zuccarelli declined to seek further consideration for the position.

== Civic organizations ==
Zuccarelli served on the boards for Habitat for Humanity, the Thornton Township Youth Committee, and Foundation I.

Even after his tenure on its board, Zuccarelli continued to be connected to the Thornton Youth Committee through associates. This led to allegations of political impropriety when Governor Pat Quinn's Neighborhood Recovery Initiative anti-violence grant program awarded the organization a $466,000 grant. The state government had tasked the Healthcare Consortium of Illinois as being the "lead agency" in determining which organizations would receive grant money allocated to Thornton Township, and Zuccarelli and Will Davis (who was also connected to the organization) served on its advisory committee to determine where to give grant money to.

== Personal life ==
In his adulthood, Zuccarelli continued to live in South Holland, Illinois.

=== Death ===
Zuccarelli died on January 3, 2022 at the age of 70.

After his death, tributes were paid to him by many officials, including Illinois Governor J. B. Pritzker, Cook County Board President Toni Preckwinkle, Cook County Sheriff Tom Dart, and Illinois Comptroller Suzana Mendoza, Cook County Assessor Fritz Kaegi, and Congresswoman Robin Kelly.

== Honors ==
Zuccarelli received a service award in 2014 from the Illinois Committee College Trustees Association. In the years 1996, 2007, and 2012 the Township Officials of Illinois Educational Conference named Zuccarelli "Supervisor of the Year". He received the Distinguished Service Award from the Illinois Committee for Honest Government.

== Electoral history ==
=== Thornton Township Supervisor ===
1993

1993 Thornton Township Supervisor Democratic primary
Party	Candidate	Votes	%
Democratic	Frank Zuccarelli	6,971	51.06
Democratic	Frederick Redell (incumbent)	6,682	48.94
Total votes		13,653	100

1993 Thornton Township Supervisor election
Party	Candidate	Votes	%
Democratic	Frank Zuccarelli	20,026	100
Total votes		20,026	100

1997

1997 Thornton Township Supervisor election
Party	Candidate	Votes	%
Democratic	Frank Zuccarelli		
Total votes			100

2001

2001 Thornton Township Supervisor Democratic primary
Party	Candidate	Votes	%
Democratic	Frank Zuccarelli (incumbent)	10,330	62.40
Democratic	Frank Giglio	6,225	37.60
Total votes		16,555	100

2001 Thornton Township Supervisor election
Party	Candidate	Votes	%
Democratic	Frank Zuccarelli (incumbent)	20,254	100
Total votes		20,254	100

2005

2005 Thornton Township Supervisor election
Party	Candidate	Votes	%
Democratic	Frank Zuccarelli (incumbent)	23,010	81.53
FRDM	Bernard P. McCann Sr.	5,215	18.47
Total votes		28,225	100

2009

2009 Thornton Township Supervisor election
Party	Candidate	Votes	%
Democratic	Frank Zuccarelli (incumbent)	18,945	99.26
Write-In	Others	142	0.74
Total votes		19,087	100

2013

2013 Thornton Township Supervisor election
Party	Candidate	Votes	%
Democratic	Frank Zuccarelli (incumbent)	20,458	99.18
Write-In	Others	169	0.82
Total votes		20,627	100

2017

2017 Thornton Township Supervisor election
Party	Candidate	Votes	%
Democratic	Frank Zuccarelli (incumbent)	16,518	99.12
Write-In	Others	147	0.88
Total votes		16,665	100

2021

2021 Thornton Township Supervisor election
Party	Candidate	Votes	%
Democratic	Frank Zuccarelli (incumbent)	11,710	100
Total votes		11,710	100

=== South Suburban College Board of Trustees ===
1978 Thornton Community College Board of Trustees election
Candidate	Votes	%
Jerry A. Meyer (incumbent)	2,522	27.66
Frank Zuccarelli	1,874	20.56
James Livingston (incumbent)	1,815	19.91
Damon Rockett (incumbent)	1,584	17.37
Michael Rochowicz	1,322	14.50

1981 Thornton Community College Board of Trustees election
Candidate	Votes	%
Frank Zuccarelli (incumbent)	8,180	17.61
Joy Waterman (incumbent)	7,420	15.97
Margaret Page	7,063	15.20
Jerry Meyer (incumbent)	6,255	13.47
Terrance L. Quandt	5,949	12.81
Allan Kalemba	4,843	10.43
Johnny M. Carson	3,983	8.57
Robert L. Gastreich	2,760	5.94

1987 Thornton Community College Board of Trustees election
Candidate	Votes	%
Carol Kruszynski-Koch	7,639	22.84
Frank Zuccarelli (incumbent)	7,314	21.87
Harold Murphy	6,050	18.09
Thomas Stovall	4,410	13.19
Owen Thomas	4,306	12.88
Richard Mecha	3,722	11.13

1993 South Suburban College Board of Trustees election
Candidate	Votes	%
Pat Wojicikowski	10,890	29.64
Frank Zuccarelli (incumbent)	9,782	26.63
Louis Toney (incumbent)	8,099	22.05
Maureen Forte	7,960	21.67

1999 South Suburban College Board of Trustees election
Candidate	Votes	%
Frank M. Zuccarelli (incumbent)	18,227	24.89
Patricia J. Wojicikowski (incumbent)	16,093	21.98
Louis Toney (incumbent)	12,585	17.19
Shirley Moore	11,129	15.20
Eric Miller	8,464	11.56
Mallicent "Vicki" Foeman	6,730	9.19

2005 South Suburban College Board of Trustees election
Candidate	Votes	%
Frank M. Zuccarelli (incumbent)	34,541	35.69
Terry Wells (incumbent)	31,580	32.63
Joseph Whittington, Jr.	30,673	31.69

2011 South Suburban College Board of Trustees election
Candidate	Votes	%
Frank M. Zuccarelli (incumbent)	18,721	36.63
Terry Wells (incumbent)	16,528	32.36
Joseph Whittington, Jr. (incumbent)	15,669	30.77
write-ins	164	0.32

2017 South Suburban College Board of Trustees election
Candidate	Votes	%
Frank M. Zuccarelli (incumbent)	20,663	30.61
Terry R. Wells (incumbent)	17,653	26.15
Joseph Whittington, Jr. (incumbent)	13,030	19.31
McStephen O.A. "Max" Solomon	9,126	13.52
Niyi Ogunneye	6,830	10.12
write-ins	192	0.28

=== Democratic committeeman ===
2002 Thornton Township Democratic Committeeman election
Party	Candidate	Votes	%
Democratic	Frank Zuccarelli	12,880	46.63
Democratic	William "Bill" Shaw	9,691	35.08
Democratic	Frank Giglio (incumbent)	5,051	18.29
Total votes		27,622	100

2006 Thornton Township Democratic Committeeman election
Party	Candidate	Votes	%
Democratic	Frank Zuccarelli (incumbent)	18,541	100
Total votes		18,541	100

2010 Thornton Township Democratic Committeeman election
Party	Candidate	Votes	%
Democratic	Frank M. Zuccarelli (incumbent)	17,499	100
Total votes		17,499	100

2014 Thornton Township Democratic Committeeman election
Party	Candidate	Votes	%
Democratic	Frank M. Zuccarelli (incumbent)	10,061	100
Total votes		10,061	100

2018 Thornton Township Democratic Committeeman election
Party	Candidate	Votes	%
Democratic	Frank M. Zuccarelli (incumbent)	23,255	99.96
Write-in	Keith Price	245	1.04
Total votes		23,500	100
