= David E. Miller =

American politician

David Miller

Member of the Illinois House of Representatives from the 29th district
- In office January 2001 – January 12, 2011
- Preceded by: Willis Harris
- Succeeded by: Thaddeus Jones

Personal details
- Born: September 23, 1962 (age 63) Cleveland, Ohio, U.S.
- Party: Democratic
- Spouse: Donna Black (m. 2001)
- Education: Boston University (BS); University of Illinois, Chicago (DDS)

David E. Miller (born September 23, 1962) is a former Democratic member of the Illinois House of Representatives, representing the 29th District from 2001 to 2011.

In the 2000 Democratic primary, Miller ran against incumbent Willis Harris as part of a larger proxy fight between the organization of William Shaw and Robert Shaw and the organization of Congressman Jesse Jackson Jr. Miller won the election by only 29 votes. The 29th district since 2002 includes parts of Burnham, Calumet City, Chicago, Dolton, Ford Heights, Glenwood, Harvey, Homewood, Lansing, Lynwood, South Holland and Thornton. In the Illinois House, he served on the Mass Transit committee.

Miller ran for the office of Comptroller in 2010. In the Democratic primary once again barely defeating his closest rival, Raja Krishnamoorthi, by about 8,000 votes. He faced the Republican former Illinois state treasurer Judy Baar Topinka in the general election, during which he gained some small attention for a proposal to put the salaries of all state officials and employees online. He lost by approximately 435,000 votes, roughly a 53%-41% margin, with minor party candidates garnering about 6%.

Miller was born September 23, 1962, in Cleveland, Ohio. Miller is a graduate of Evanston Township High School, Boston University, and the University of Illinois School of Dentistry.

In 2019, Miller was appointed to the Teachers Retirement System Board of Trustees for a term ending July 14, 2020. The appointment expired before he could be confirmed by the Illinois Senate.

Party political offices
Preceded by Daniel Hynes	Democratic nominee for Illinois Comptroller; 2010	Succeeded by Sheila Simon
