= 2013 Illinois's 2nd congressional district special election =

2013 Illinois' 2nd congressional district special election
- April 9, 2013
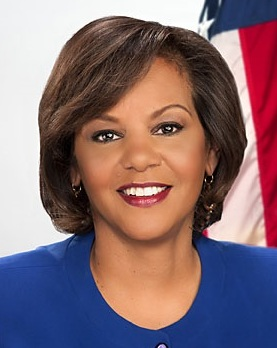

Nominee	Robin Kelly	Paul McKinley
Party	Democratic	Republican
Popular vote	58,834	18,387
Percentage	70.7%	22.1%
- County results Kelly: 80–90% McKinley: 40–50% 50–60%
U.S. Representative before election
Jesse Jackson Jr.
Democratic
Elected U.S. Representative
Robin Kelly
Democratic

A special election for Illinois' 2nd congressional district was held on April 9, 2013, to fill a seat in the United States House of Representatives for Illinois's 2nd congressional district, after Representative Jesse Jackson Jr. resigned on November 21, 2012. The special election was required to be held within 115 days of Jackson's resignation. It was won by Democratic candidate Robin Kelly, formerly the Chief Administrative Officer of Cook County.

Pat Quinn, the Governor of Illinois, set the primary elections for February 26, coinciding with municipal primary elections, and initially set the general election for March 19. However, legislation was enacted at Quinn's request to allow the general election to coincide with municipal general elections held on April 9.

The winner of the Democratic primary was Robin Kelly and Paul McKinley won the Republican primary. The Green Party nominated 2010 U.S. Senate candidate LeAlan Jones.

== Democratic primary ==
=== Candidates ===
==== Declared ====
- Anthony Beale, Alderman
- John Blyt
- Patrick O. Brutus
- Clifford Eagleton
- Ernest B. Fenton
- Debbie Halvorson, former U.S. Representative
- Gregory Haynes
- Denise A. Hill, Minister (write-in)
- Robin Kelly, Cook County Chief Administrative Officer (Won primary)
- Fatimah N. Muhammed
- Larry D. Pickens
- Charles Rayburn
- Mel Reynolds, former U.S. Representative
- Jonathan Victor
- Joyce W. Washington, 2004 U.S. Senate candidate
- Anthony W. Williams, Community Activist

==== Withdrawn ====
- Donne Trotter, State Senator (endorsed Robin Kelly)
- Napoleon Harris, State Senator (endorsed Robin Kelly)
- Toi Hutchinson, State Senator (endorsed Robin Kelly)

==== Declined ====
- Sam Adam Jr., attorney
- Corey Brooks, pastor
- William D. Burns, Alderman
- Jonathan Jackson, civil rights activist and Jackson Jr.'s brother
- Sandi Jackson, Alderman and Jackson Jr.'s wife
- David E. Miller, former state Representative
- Todd Stroger, former President of the Cook County Board of Commissioners

==== Did not file ====
- James Hickey, President of the Orland Fire Protection District board and candidate for the 11th congressional district in 2012

=== Polling ===
Poll source	Date(s) administered	Sample size	Margin of error	Anthony Beale	Debbie Halvorson	Napoleon Harris	Toi Hutchinson	Robin Kelly	Mel Reynolds	Joyce Washington	Other	Undecided
GBA Strategies^	February 4–5, 2013	400	± 4.9%	10%	22%	—	20%	26%	5%	2%	—	15%
Normington, Petts & Associates^{+}	January 8–10, 2013	400	± 4.9%	5%	16%	7%	12%	8%	7%	—	5%	40%
GBA Strategies^	January 3–7, 2013	500	± 4.4%	10%	25%	9%	16%	15%	8%	2%	—	15%

- + Internal poll for Toi Hutchison Campaign
- ^ Internal poll for Robin Kelly Campaign

=== Results ===
Results by county: Kelly—50–60% Halvorson—70–80% Halvorson—60–70%

2013 Democratic Primary - Illinois's 2nd Congressional District Special Election
Party	Candidate	Votes	%	±%
Democratic	Robin Kelly	30,872	51.8	N/A
Democratic	Debbie Halvorson	14,533	24.4	N/A
Democratic	Anthony Beale	6,421	10.8	N/A
Democratic	Joyce W. Washington	2,550	4.4	N/A
Democratic	Toi Hutchinson	1,598	2.7	N/A
Democratic	Ernest B. Fenton	1,538	2.6	N/A
Democratic	Anthony W. Williams	636	1.1	N/A
Democratic	Mel Reynolds	454	0.8	N/A
Democratic	Clifford Eagleton	204	0.3	N/A
Democratic	Fatimah N. Muhammad	190	0.3	N/A
Democratic	Gregory Haynes	142	0.2	N/A
Democratic	Larry D. Pickens	126	0.2	N/A
Democratic	John Blyt	103	0.2	N/A
Democratic	Jonathan Victor	91	0.2	N/A
Democratic	Charles Rayburn	74	0.1	N/A
Democratic	Patrick O. Brutus	61	0.1	N/A

== Republican primary ==
=== Candidates ===
==== Declared ====
- Lenny McAllister, political commentator and former radio show host
- Paul McKinley (Won primary)
- Beverly E. Reid
- Eric M. Wallace

==== Withdrawn ====
- James Taylor Sr., newspaper publisher and candidate for the 2nd congressional district in 2012

=== Results ===
Results by county: McKinley—30–40% Wallace—30–40% McAllister—20–30%

2013 Republican Primary - Illinois's 2nd Congressional District Special Election
Party	Candidate	Votes	%	±%
Republican	Paul McKinley	955	27.1	N/A
Republican	Eric M. Wallace	932	26.4	N/A
Republican	Lenny McAllister	859	24.3	N/A
Republican	Beverly E. Reid	521	14.8	N/A
Republican	James Taylor Sr.	263	7.5	N/A

== Green Party ==
The Green Party nominated 2010 U.S. Senate candidate and journalist LeAlan Jones to run on the Green Party ticket.

== Independent candidates ==
- Curtiss Llong Bey
- Marcus Lewis, postal worker and candidate for the 2nd congressional district in 2012
- Elizabeth "Liz" Pahlke

=== Did not file ===
==== Socialist Workers Party ====
- John Hawkins, communist political organizer

== Results ==
Illinois's 2nd congressional district, 2013 (special)
Party	Candidate	Votes	%	±%
Democratic	Robin Kelly	58,834	70.72%	+7.47%
Republican	Paul McKinley	18,387	22.10%	−1.12%
Independent	Elizabeth "Liz" Pahlke	2,525	3.04%	N/A
Green	LeAlan Jones	1,531	1.84%	N/A
Independent	Marcus Lewis	1,359	1.63%	−11.81%
Independent	Curtiss Llong Bey	548	0.66%	N/A
Independent	Steve Piekarczyk (write-in)	9	0.00%	N/A
Total votes		83,193	100.0%	N/A
Democratic hold				

=== County results ===
Vote breakdown by county
	Robin Kelly Democratic		Paul McKinley Republican		Elizabeth Pahlke Independent		LeAlan Jones Green		Marcus Lewis Independent		Curtiss Llong Bey Independent		Steve Piekarczyk Write-in		Total
County	Votes	%	Votes	%	Votes	%	Votes	%	Votes	%	Votes	%	Votes	%	Votes
Cook	49,105	82.40%	7,139	11.98%	1,299	2.18%	769	1.29%	940	1.58%	332	0.56%	9	0.02%	59,593
Kankakee	6,077	41.01%	7,470	50.41%	591	3.99%	329	2.22%	218	1.47%	134	0.90%	0	0.00%	14,819
Will	3,652	41.59%	3,778	43.02%	635	7.23%	433	4.93%	201	2.29%	82	0.93%	0	0.00%	8,781
