= Harold Murphy (politician) =

American politician

Harold Murphy (April 1, 1938 – January 5, 2015) was an American politician who most notably served as a Democratic member of the Illinois House of Representatives from 1993 to 2003.

== Early life and career ==
Born in Birmingham, Alabama, Murphy served in the United States Army reserves. He received his bachelor's degree in education from Northeastern Illinois University and then worked in the office of the Illinois Secretary of State. He served on the Markham, Illinois City Council, school board, and the Markham Park District. He worked as a supervising manager of the Charles Chew Facility of the secretary of state's office for seven years. At the time of his election to the House, he was the proprietor of a small fishing and weekend resort in Indiana.

== Local politics ==
In 1985, he unsuccessfully ran for mayor as a write-in candidate. In 1987, he was elected to the board of trustees of the Thornton Community College (South Suburban College) on a slate organized by incumbent member Frank Zuccarelli. He also held elected office as a village trustee in Markham.

== State politics ==
He was elected to the Illinois House of Representatives in the 1992 general election. He was reelected four times before losing the 2002 Democratic primary to Robin Kelly.
