= Tiffany Henyard =

American politician (born 1983)

Supervisor of Thornton Township, Illinois
- In office March 3, 2022 – May 19, 2025
- Preceded by: Frank Zuccarelli
- Succeeded by: Napoleon Harris

Mayor of Dolton, Illinois
- In office May 8, 2021 – May 5, 2025
- Preceded by: Riley Rogers
- Succeeded by: Jason House

Dolton Village Trustee
- In office May 2013 – May 2021

Personal details
- Born: Tiffany Aiesha Henyard; June 18, 1983 (age 43) Harvey, Illinois, U.S.
- Party: Republican (since 2026)
- Other political affiliations: Democratic (before 2026)
- Education: Robert Morris University Illinois (Claimed)
- Website: Official website

Tiffany Aiesha Henyard (born June 18, 1983) is an American politician and businesswoman who served as mayor of Dolton, Illinois from 2021 to 2025 and as supervisor of Thornton Township, Illinois from 2022 to 2025. She previously served two terms as a member of the Dolton Village Board of Trustees from 2013 to 2021. Henyard was elected trustee in 2013 and 2017, and was elected mayor in 2021. She was appointed township supervisor in 2022. The Hill and Newsweek have reported that Henyard was dubbed "America's worst mayor".

During her tenure as mayor and supervisor, Henyard was the subject of multiple investigations and legal proceedings concerning official misconduct and mismanagement of public funds. In 2024, the Illinois Attorney General ordered a charitable organization associated with her to cease soliciting donations. The Federal Bureau of Investigation also conducted inquiries and issued subpoenas related to village operations. As of 2024, Henyard was under civil investigation by the Illinois Department of Human Rights and was named as a defendant in several lawsuits.

In 2025, Henyard ran for reelection as mayor of Dolton. She was defeated in the Democratic primary, 88% – 12%, by trustee Jason House. Also in 2025, she sought election as Thornton Township supervisor; she did not receive the Democratic nomination. Henyard later relocated to Fulton County, Georgia, where she unsuccessfully ran for the Fulton County Board of Commissioners in 2026 as a Republican.

== Early life, education, and personal life ==
Henyard grew up in Dolton. She graduated from Thornridge High School. She has stated that she earned a degree in business administration from Robert Morris University Illinois; however, a subsequent investigation was unable to substantiate this claim.

In 2011, Henyard began her involvement in government and politics by working on then-Illinois Governor Pat Quinn's "Put Illinois to Work" initiative. She has called Dorothy Brown and Frank Zuccarelli two of her mentors.

Henyard is a single mother.

== Business career ==
In August 2019, WBBM-TV reported that a property owned by Henyard and rented under the Section 8 housing program had severe mold and water leakage issues. Later that year, the station reported that the property had been deemed uninhabitable and the tenant was forced to relocate, while Henyard continued to receive housing subsidies for the property. The tenant alleged that Henyard failed to address the mold issue, and the reports prompted further scrutiny of the property's inspection record.

Henyard founded a restaurant business called Good Burger in Calumet City, Illinois. The business later closed before opening a new location on the campus of South Suburban College in South Holland, Illinois in 2024. The restaurant was the subject of complaints regarding sanitary conditions and permit compliance, and records indicated that the company was delinquent on rent payments. The business was involuntarily dissolved by the Illinois Secretary of State in 2022.

== Dolton village trustee (2013–2021) ==
Henyard served two terms as a village trustee in Dolton. She was first elected in the 2013 plurality-at-large election, and was re-elected in 2017. Supporters referred to her as the "People's Trustee". During her tenure, she was a frequent critic of then-Mayor Riley Rogers.

In 2018, Henyard was one of two trustees who voted against overturning Rogers's veto of the city's budget appropriation for the 2018–2019 fiscal year. The board overrode the veto in a 4–2 vote, after which ten village employees were laid off. That year, Henyard joined other trustees in an unsuccessful legal effort to prevent ballot measures supported by Rogers from appearing on the ballot. The measures, which proposed reducing the size of the board of trustees and imposing term limits, were later rejected by voters.

As trustee, Henyard started the village's Block by Block program, which allowed individuals to purchase vacant houses for $5,000 in an effort to restore properties to the tax rolls.

== Mayor of Dolton ==
=== Elections ===
==== 2021 ====
In 2020, Henyard announced her candidacy for mayor of Dolton in the 2021 municipal election. Her campaign focused on criticism of incumbent mayor Riley Rogers's administration. Henyard won the Democratic Party primary, defeating Rogers in a four-way contest, and subsequently defeated independent candidate Ronnie Burge in the general election with approximately 82 percent of the vote.

Henyard campaigned with a slate of candidates referred to as the Dream Team. From this group, trustee candidates Kiana Belcher and incumbent Jason House were elected, along with village clerk candidate Alison Key. Relations between Henyard and these officials later deteriorated, and by 2022, they joined other members of the village board in legal actions involving Henyard.

==== 2025 ====
Henyard sought reelection in 2025 but was defeated in the Democratic primary on February 25, 2025, by trustee Jason House, who received approximately 88 percent of the vote to Henyard's 12 percent. House had originally been aligned with Henyard when they ran on a joint ticket in 2021, but had become fiercely opposed to her during the course of her mayoralty.

=== Tenure (2021–2025) ===
Henyard was sworn in as mayor of Dolton in May 2021, becoming the first woman and, at age 37, the youngest person to hold the office.

Henyard's tenure was scandal-plagued, attracting much criticism. While Henyard promoted herself as a "Super Mayor", media outlets The Hill and Newsweek report that she had attracted the derisive nickname "America's worst mayor". Among media deep-dives produced about her mayoralty was an hour-long NBC Chicago documentary titled "Super Mayor: The Cost of Chaos in Dolton", released in December 2024.

==== Governance conflicts ====
Within the first months of her administration, Henyard faced criticism from members of the village board regarding government transparency and the use of municipal funds. In 2021, the board filed a lawsuit alleging conflicts of interest and later voted to censure her. Henyard accused certain trustees of disrupting village operations, and in response to disputes over governance, she restricted access to trustee offices and canceled meetings. Trustees subsequently held meetings without her participation.

In October 2021, the board voted to require that hiring and firing decisions be made with its advice and consent; trustees later alleged that Henyard continued to make staffing changes unilaterally. That year, protests followed a fatal shooting by a police officer in Dolton, during which Henyard was criticized by demonstrators.

==== Administrative actions ====
During her tenure, Henyard appointed and later dismissed several department officials, including police chief Robert Collins, whom she rehired upon taking office and fired in 2023. In 2024, Collins filed a wrongful termination lawsuit alleging that his removal was without cause and without board approval, and that it had been motivated as retribution for the mayor's perception of his wife and a number of his personal acquaintances as being political adversaries.

In October 2021, Henyard appointed Dorothy Brown as Dolton's village administrator. The decision drew criticism and Brown left the role within a month.

==== Financial mismanagement ====
By 2022, Henyard faced allegations of spending village funds without proper approval from the board of trustees or the village clerk. Trustees and Henyard argued at council meetings over city spending.

The board of trustees frequently challenged Henyard's spending decisions. Trustees reported that by early 2024, Dolton had accumulated approximately $7 million in debt and warned that the village was at risk of financial insolvency. Disputes continued over budget allocations, and in February 2024, the board overrode Henyard's veto of the 2024–25 fiscal year budget, which included spending reductions. Henyard contended that the cuts would bankrupt the village.

In 2023 and 2024, multiple news outlets reported on Henyard's use of a police security detail, estimating that it had cost the village approximately hundreds of thousands to $1 million. Trustees argued that diverting police resources for this purpose negatively affected public safety, and in 2021 had voted to attempt to require her to pay the city back for her police protection.

==== Legal issues ====
Multiple investigations and legal actions were initiated during Henyard's term. In early 2024, the Federal Bureau of Investigation interviewed witnesses and served subpoenas at Dolton Village Hall as part of an inquiry into village finances and administration. By April 2024, the village was listed as a defendant in nearly 40 active lawsuits. That month, the board hired Lori Lightfoot to review Henyard's management of public funds. Lightfoot's report, released in January 2025, concluded that Henyard engaged in excessive spending, withheld financial information, and failed to maintain transparency.

In March 2024, WMAQ-TV reported that the Illinois Department of Human Rights was investigating claims by Henyard's former assistant, who alleged that Henyard retaliated against her after she reported being sexually assaulted by a village trustee. Henyard denied the allegations, describing them as being made by disgruntled employees.

In 2024, Redeemed Christian Church of God Resurrection Power Assembly filed a lawsuit against Henyard and the village, alleging discrimination and improper application of zoning codes when the village prevented the church from renovating a building it had acquired. That same year, Samysha Williams, a 2023 Dolton village trustee candidate, filed a lawsuit accusing Henyard and her campaign of defamation and wrongful termination from her job at the village while taking family leave in 2022.

Henyard's administration also faced financial disputes with vendors and creditors. In February 2024, KS State Bank warned the village that 13 Dolton police department vehicles were subject to repossession over unpaid balances. Trustees stated that payment authorization had been granted months earlier, while Henyard contended the board had withheld approval.

Dolton residents, government employees, and business owners have alleged that Henyard used her position to retaliate against perceived political opponents, including claims that she directed Dolton police to target businesses whose owners did not support her and to solicit campaign contributions. She has also been accused of dismissing several village employees for political reasons.

==== Recall attempt and aftermath ====
In 2022, the Dolton Village Board attempted to initiate a recall election, placing two referendum questions on the ballot—one to establish a recall mechanism (Note: The text of the question read as "Shall the following recall mechanism be adopted and effective immediately, upon certification by the County Clerk, for the Village of Dolton?: Recall of the Village President (Mayor) Recall of the Village President (Mayor) of the Village of Dolton is established, applicable to, and effective as of the certification of results of the June 28, 2022 General Primary Election. 'Recall' shall mean the power of the electorate of the Village of Dolton to remove the Village President (Mayor) from office, and to immediately create a vacancy in the office of the Village President (Mayor) to be filled in the manner provided by law for filling such vacancy, by a majority vote of those voting on a question of whether to recall and remove the Village President (Mayor) of the Village of Dolton at a regularly scheduled election. Said question of whether to recall and remove the Village President (Mayor) of the Village of Dolton may be submitted either by resolution of the Dolton Corporate Authorities or by petition in the manner prescribed by law for the submission of public questions.") and another to remove Henyard from office. (Note: The text of the question read as "If the recall mechanism is passed by a majority of voters at the June 28, 2022 General Primary Election, shall Tiffany A. Henyard be recalled and removed from the office of Village President (Mayor) of the Village of Dolton, effective upon certification of the election results by the Cook County Clerk?") Both measures were approved by a majority of voters. Subsequent court rulings determined that the referendums were invalid, and a permanent injunction prevented certification of the results.

In February 2024, the board adopted a resolution requesting investigations by county, state, and federal authorities. Henyard vetoed the resolution and the board overrode her veto in April 2024.

== Thornton Township Supervisor (2022–2025) ==
=== Appointment ===
On March 3, 2022, Henyard was appointed and sworn in as supervisor of Thornton Township, Illinois, following the death of incumbent Frank Zuccarelli. The appointment was made by the Thornton Township Board in a vote held shortly before the legal deadline for filling the vacancy, after which the decision would have been made by township electors in a public meeting. Henyard was the last of nine nominees considered for the position. She became the youngest person, the first woman, and the first African American to serve as supervisor of Thornton Township.

=== Finances ===
In 2023, Henyard stated that she had inherited financial difficulties in the township, alleging that the payroll included "ghost employees" who did little work and that the township faced a $5 million budget deficit, which she said she resolved.

Henyard continued the Zuccarelli Assistance Program, which employs teenagers aged 16 and older to mow lawns for senior citizens, renaming it the Henyard Assistance Program.

In February 2024, the township board, with Henyard's support, allocated $1 million for rental and mortgage assistance through the general assistance department. The program provided up to $3,000 to individuals at least two months behind on payments but excluded those already in eviction proceedings. The funding sources for the initiative were not specified.

=== Referendums ===
In April 2023 and March 2024, voters in Thornton Township considered referendums proposing a 0.15% property tax to fund mental health services, estimated to generate $3 million annually. The measure was defeated both times, first by a 51% to 49% margin in 2023 and later by a larger margin in 2024.

Before the second vote, mayors from 11 of the township's 17 municipalities co-signed an open letter opposing the proposal, citing insufficient information about how the funds would be used.

=== Salary and governance ===
Henyard's annual salary as supervisor was $224,000, the same as her predecessor's since 2017. In December 2023, the township adopted a resolution, supported by Henyard, to reduce the supervisor's salary by 90% for future officeholders, setting it at $22,400 per year. The reduction would take effect only after Henyard's tenure ended. Similar provisions were approved for township trustees.

Municipal attorney Burt Odelson, a political opponent of Henyard, criticized the resolution as unlawful, arguing that salaries must not vary based on the officeholder's identity.

=== Controversies and legal issues ===
In August 2023, Henyard was accused of locking the township assessor, who was a political rival, out of the assessor's office.

In February 2024, reporters were denied entry to a township Black History Month event unless they signed a non-disclosure agreement.

In 2024, a former township employee filed a lawsuit against Henyard and the township, alleging retaliation for refusing to compile "dirt" on other employees and for taking leave under the Family and Medical Leave Act. The complaint alleged that the employee was denied access to the township building and later terminated after complaining about six weeks of pay she had not received.

In April 2025, Henyard was investigated by the FBI due to suspicions about the propriety of government spending during her tenure.

=== 2025 defeat ===
Henyard sought the Democratic Party nomination for township supervisor in the 2025 election. Thornton Township Democrats held a caucus in which State Senator Napoleon Harris defeated Henyard for the nomination.

== Tiffany Henyard CARES ==
Tiffany Henyard founded Tiffany Henyard CARES, a nonprofit organization with a stated mission to assist individuals with cancer. The organization received promotion on official government websites and social media accounts associated with Henyard's public offices. Several officers of the organization also held positions within the city government.

In May 2023, WFLD reported that public funds were spent on an organizational group bicycle ride to the Illinois State Capitol in Springfield, Illinois in support of a breast cancer–related bill. The report noted that the state legislature was not in session at the time and that the referenced bill had not been formally filed.

In January 2024, WGN-TV reported that the township spent $10,248 on hotel accommodations located along the route of a 2022 protest sponsored by the nonprofit, which traveled between Dolton and Springfield. The same report stated that township trustees had, on multiple occasions, been asked to approve large funding allocations to the charity.

In January 2024, it was reported that Tiffany Henyard CARES had not submitted the required annual financial reports mandated for charitable and nonprofit organizations. After the nonprofit did not meet the February 16 filing deadline, the Illinois Attorney General's Office ordered the organization to cease soliciting donations and warned that it might seek to recover payments made to its board members and staff. The Attorney General's Office also noted that the nonprofit was not in good standing and was not registered with the state.

In March 2024, a representative of the organization submitted an incomplete filing to the Attorney General's Office, which lacked key financial documentation. The filing indicated that nearly all of the nonprofit's funding originated from township and village taxpayer sources.

By March 2024, Henyard sought to distance herself from the organization.

== Post-mayoral endeavors ==
Henyard relocated to Fulton County in the U.S state of Georgia. There is controversy about her residency in Georgia. She claims to have become a resident of Georgia on May 1, 2025, but she was still the mayor of Dolton, Illinois until her successor was sworn in on May 5, 2025. She did not obtain her Georgia driver's license until February 26, 2026, and she registered to vote in Georgia on February 27, 2026.

In June 2025, Henyard announced that she would self-publish a "tell-all" autobiography entitled "Standing on Business: Volume 1.", which she would sell for $99 per copy.

By December 2025, Henyard had opened a store in College Park, Georgia named "Tha New Wave Clothing Shop".

In 2026, Henyard filed to run as a Republican for the 5th district seat on the Fulton County Board of Commissioners. She was the lone candidate for the Republican nomination. The district has a heavy Democratic lean, making her bid for office a long-shot. Without an opponent in her primary, Henyard formally won the Republican nomination on May 19. She was noted to have received the lowest vote total among any of the 18 candidates across all partisan primaries for seats on the county board.

She lost in the general election.

== Electoral history ==
Dolton village trustee elections

2013 Dolton village trustees election Democratic primary
Party	Candidate	Votes	%
Democratic	Tiffany Henyard	692	35.04
Democratic	Robert E. Hunt Jr.	663	33.57
write-in	Mary Kay Duggan	338	17.11
write-in	Stanley "Stan" Brown	282	14.28
Total votes		1,975	100

2013 Dolton village trustees election
Party	Candidate	Votes	%
Democratic	Robert E. Hunt Jr.	1,648	17.29
Democratic	Tiffany A. Henyard	1,574	16.52
Democratic	Stanley "Stan" Brown	1,479	15.52
People's Party Of Dolton	Deborah Green	873	9.16
Unified for Progress	Denise Harris	707	7.42
People's Party Of Dolton	William Lochart	652	6.84
Unified for Progress	James T. Jefferson	600	6.30
People's Party Of Dolton	Willie Lee Lowe Jr.	576	6.04
Unified for Progress	Charles Walls	560	5.88
Independent	Garrett Ghezzi	278	2.92
Visionary	Katina Washington	205	2.15
Visionary	Aaron Brown	199	2.09
Visionary	Krystel Russell	171	1.79
write-in	Others	7	0.07
Total votes		9,529	100

2017 Dolton village trustees election
Party	Candidate	Votes	%
Democratic	Deborah M. Denton	897	34.41
Democratic	Tiffany A. Henyard (incumbent)	807	30.96
Democratic	Jason House	856	32.83
write-in	Others	47	1.80
Total votes		2,607	100

2019 Dolton village trustees election Democratic primary
Party	Candidate	Votes	%
Democratic	Deborah M. Denton (incumbent)	1,716	16.11
Democratic	Tiffany A. Henyard (incumbent)	1,606	15.08
Democratic	Jason House (incumbent)	1,483	13.92
Democratic	Robert E. Hunt Jr.	1,407	13.21
Democratic	Meryl "Deneen" Williams	1,372	12.88
Democratic	Ernesto E. Mickens	1,278	12.00
Democratic	Felita D. Crayton	475	4.46
Democratic	Mary E. Avent	390	3.66
Democratic	Stanford J. Culp	340	3.19
Democratic	Kevin A. Boens	272	2.55
Democratic	Willie L. Lowe Jr.	211	1.98
Democratic	Helaine Yates	103	0.97
Total votes		10,653	100

Dolton mayoral elections

2021 Dolton mayoral Democratic primary election
Party	Candidate	Votes	%
Democratic	Tiffany A. Henyard	1,001	34.28
Democratic	Riley Rogers (incumbent)	888	30.41
Democratic	Andrew Holmes	862	29.52
Democratic	Robert Shaw	169	5.79
Total votes		2,920	100

2021 Dolton mayoral general election
Party	Candidate	Votes	%
Democratic	Tiffany A. Henyard	2,036	82.03
Independent	Ronnie Burge	446	17.97
Total votes		2,482	100
Democratic hold			

2022 Dolton mayoral recall election result subsequently nullified by court ruling
Choice	Votes	%
Yes (for recalling Henyard)	1,960	56.06
No (against recalling Henyard)	1,536	43.94
Total votes	3,496	100

2025 Dolton mayoral Democratic primary
Party	Candidate	Votes	%
Democratic	Jason House	3,896	87.03
Democratic	Tiffany Henyard (incumbent)	536	12.97
Total votes		4,432	100
