= Frank Giglio =

American politician

Frank Giglio (born November 9, 1933) is an American plumber and politician.

Born in Chicago, Illinois, Giglio served in the United States Army. He went to Saint Joseph's College and then received his bachelor's degree from Governors State University. Giglio was a plumber and lived in Calumet City, Illinois. He served in the Illinois House of Representatives from 1975 to 1979 and from 1981 to 1995. Giglio was a Democrat.

Giglio served as the Democratic Party committeeman for Thornton Township for 29 years, until he was unseated by Frank Zuccarelli in 2002.
