= Robert P. Regan =

American politician and businessman

official portrait photograph, 1985

Robert P. Regan (January 4, 1936 – May 3, 1995) was an American politician and businessman.

Regan was born in Chicago, Illinois. He went to Thornton Community College and to Illinois Wesleyan University. Regan was involved with the insurance business. He was also worked as a supervisor for the Illinois Department of Insurance. Regan served on the Will County Board and was a vice-chair of the county board. Regan served in the Illinois House of Representatives from 1985 to 1993 and was a Republican. He died at his home in Crete, Illinois.
