= Illinois Department of Financial and Professional Regulation =

U.S. state government agency

Department overview
- Formed: July 1, 2004
- Jurisdiction: Illinois
- Department executives: Mario Treto, Jr., Secretary; Camile Lindsay, Director of the Division of Professional Regulation; Laurie Murphy, Director of the Division of Real Estate; Susana Soriano, Director of the Division of Banking; Francisco Menchaca, Director of the Division of Financial Institutions
- Key documents: Financial Institutions Code (20 ILCS 1205); Department of Professional Regulation Law (20 ILCS 2105); 20 ILCS 1405; 20 ILCS 3205; Executive Order 6 of 2004
- Website: idfpr.illinois.gov

The Illinois Department of Financial and Professional Regulation (IDFPR) is a code department of the Illinois state government. The department has four divisions, namely the Division of Banking, the Division of Financial Institutions, the Division of Professional Regulation, and the Division of Real Estate.

The department oversees the regulation and licensure of banks and financial institutions, real estate businesses and professionals, and various licensed professions, and is charged with enforcing standards of professional practice and protecting the rights of Illinois residents in their transactions with regulated industries.

== History ==
The Illinois Department of Financial and Professional Regulation was created on July 1, 2004. It is responsible for the regulation, oversight, and licensure of almost 300 different types of professional licenses and financial institutions.

On March 31, 2014, Illinois Executive Order 2014-03, issued by Governor Pat Quinn, created the Division of Real Estate within the department.

In August 2013, Illinois became the 20th state to legalize medical cannabis when the Compassionate Use of Medical Cannabis Program Act was signed into law. IDFPR became responsible for licensing and regulating the dispensaries that sell medical cannabis to patients, along with each dispensaries’ Principal Officers, Agents-in-Charge, and Agents.

On June 25, 2019, Governor JB Pritzker signed the Cannabis Regulation and Tax Act, which made Illinois the 11th state to legalize adult use cannabis. IDFPR oversaw the successful rollout of the program, which allowed existing medical cannabis dispensaries to begin selling adult use cannabis on January 1, 2020. Similar to its medical cannabis licensing responsibilities, IDFPR licenses adult use cannabis dispensaries, along with the Principal Officers, Agents-in-Charge, and Agents at each dispensary. IDFPR is also responsible for tracking and reporting the sales made at adult use cannabis dispensaries.

== Departmental divisions ==
=== Division of Banking ===
- State Chartered Banks, Trust Companies and Saving Institutions
- Mortgage Loan Originators
- Pawnbrokers
- Residential Mortgage Companies State
- Student Loan Servicers

=== Division of Financial Institutions ===
- Auto Title Lenders
- Consumer Installment Lenders
- Credit Unions
- Currency Exchanges
- Debt Management
- Debt Settlement
- Money Transmitters
- Safety Deposit Boxes, Safes, & Vaults
- Payday Lenders
- Sales Finance
- Title Insurance

=== Division of Professional Regulation ===
- Acupuncture
- Adult Use Cannabis
- Architecture
- Athletic Training
- Audiology
- Barber, Cosmetology, Esthetics, Hair Braiding, and Nail Technology Shops
- Cemetery / Cemetery Managers
- Collection Agency
- Controlled Substance
- Dentistry
- Detection of Deception
- Detective, Alarm, Security, and Locksmith
- Dietitian Nutritionist
- Electrologists
- Environmental Health Practice
- Funeral Directing and Embalming
- Genetic Counselor
- Geology
- Home Medical Equipment and Service
- Humane Euthanasia
- Interior Design
- Land Surveying
- Limited Liability Company
- Mail Order Ophthalmic Provider
- Marriage and Family Therapy
- Massage Therapy
- Medical
- Medical Cannabis
- Medical Corporation
- Naprapathy
- Nursing
- Nursing Home Administration
- Occupational Therapy
- Optometry
- Orthotics, Prosthetics & Pedorthics
- Perfusion
- Pharmacy
- Physical Therapy
- Physician Assistant
- Podiatry
- Professional Boxing and Mixed Martial Arts
- Professional Counseling
- Professional Engineering
- Service Corporation
- Psychology
- Public Accounting
- Respiratory Care
- Roofing
- Sex Offender Evaluators
- Shorthand Reporting
- Social Work
- Speech-Language Pathology and Audiology
- Structural Engineering
- Surgical Assistant
- Veterinary Medicine
- Wholesale Drug Distributors

=== Division of Real Estate ===
- Auction
- Community Association Management
- Home Inspection
- Real Estate Appraisal
- Real Estate Brokerage
