= Thaddeus Jones (politician) =

American politician

Mayor of Calumet City, Illinois
- Incumbent
- Assumed office May 1, 2021
- Preceded by: Michelle Markiewicz Qualkinbush

Member of the Illinois House of Representatives from the 29th district
- Incumbent
- Assumed office January 12, 2011
- Preceded by: David E. Miller

Personal details
- Party: Democratic
- Education: Loyola University
- Profession: Full Time Legislator
- Website: Official website

Thaddeus Jones is an American politician, currently serving as both the Illinois state representative for the 29th district and as the mayor of Calumet City, Illinois. The 29th district includes all or parts of Chicago, Dolton, South Holland, Lansing, Calumet City, Thornton, Glenwood, Sauk Village, Steger, Crete and Monee. Jones is a member of the Democratic Party.

== Political career ==
Jones' first position in elective office was as Calumet City's 3rd ward alderman from 1997 to 2007. His first year in state office began in 2011, after beating primary opponent Sheryl Tillman for the 29th district seat by 24 points, and Green Party candidate Kenny Williams by 66 points in the 2010 Illinois General election.

In 2017, Jones resigned from his role with his eponymous Jones Foundation for using charitable donations for campaign finance purposes.

In 2021, Jones become the first Black mayor of Calumet City, after beating 18-year incumbent mayor Michelle Markiewicz Qualkinbush. The election was fiercely-contested, with both sides alleging foul play against each other. The Qualkinbush team accused Jones of falsifying his residency to meet eligibility requirements, while the Jones campaign cited their opponents' lack of reporting on an estimated $80,000 in public funds spent on mailers calling for his ballot ineligibility. Jones' victory and inauguration were subject to judicial challenge which initially overturned the results, but this judgment was eventually appealed and affirmed in the Supreme Court of Illinois. Jones beat a write-in candidate Tony Quiroz on April 6, and will simultaneously hold the 29th district Illinois statehouse seat while acting as Calumet City mayor. He was sworn in May 1, 2021.

As of July 3, 2022, Representative Jones is a member of the following Illinois House committees:

- Family Law & Probate Subcommittee (HJAU-FLAW)
- (Chairman of) Insurance Committee (HINS)
- Judiciary - Civil Committee (HJUA)
- Labor & Commerce Committee (HLBR)
- Minority Impact Analysis Subcommittee (HLBR-MIAS)
- Prescription Drug Affordability Committee (HPDA)
- (Co-chairman of) Special Issues (INS) Subcommittee (HINS-SPIS)
- Workforce Development Subcommittee (HLBR-WORK)

== Personal life ==
According to his official website, Jones has two sons, and lives with his wife Saprina in South Holland.

== Electoral history ==
Illinois 29th State House District Democratic Primary, 2010
| Party | Candidate | Votes | % |
|---|---|---|---|
| Democratic | Thaddeus Jones | 7,908 | 62.02 |
| Democratic | Sheryl E. Tillman | 4,843 | 37.98 |
| Total votes | | 12,751 | 100.0 |

Illinois 29th State House District General Election, 2010
| Party | Candidate | Votes | % |
|---|---|---|---|
| Democratic | Thaddeus Jones | 24,762 | 83.01 |
| Green | Kenneth "Kenny" Williams | 5,067 | 16.99 |
| Total votes | | 29,829 | 100.0 |

Illinois 29th State House District General Election, 2012
| Party | Candidate | Votes | % |
|---|---|---|---|
| Democratic | Thaddeus Jones (incumbent) | 40,000 | 100.0 |
| Total votes | | 40,000 | 100.0 |

Illinois 29th State House District Democratic Primary, 2014
| Party | Candidate | Votes | % |
|---|---|---|---|
| Democratic | Thaddeus Jones (incumbent) | 5,468 | 73.23 |
| Democratic | Kenneth "Kenny" Williams | 1,999 | 26.77 |
| Total votes | | 7,467 | 100.0 |

Illinois 29th State House District General Election, 2014
| Party | Candidate | Votes | % |
|---|---|---|---|
| Democratic | Thaddeus Jones (incumbent) | 27,637 | 100.0 |
| Total votes | | 27,637 | 100.0 |

Illinois 29th State House District Democratic Primary, 2016
| Party | Candidate | Votes | % |
|---|---|---|---|
| Democratic | Thaddeus Jones (incumbent) | 17,934 | 65.30 |
| Democratic | Kenneth "Kenny" Williams | 6,030 | 21.96 |
| Democratic | Wilbur "Will" Tillman | 3,501 | 12.75 |
| Total votes | | 27,465 | 100.0 |

Illinois 29th State House District General Election, 2016
| Party | Candidate | Votes | % |
|---|---|---|---|
| Democratic | Thaddeus Jones (incumbent) | 42,740 | 100.0 |
| Total votes | | 42,740 | 100.0 |

Illinois 29th State House District Democratic Primary, 2018
| Party | Candidate | Votes | % |
|---|---|---|---|
| Democratic | Thaddeus Jones (incumbent) | 11,021 | 64.23 |
| Democratic | Corean Davis | 6,137 | 35.77 |
| Total votes | | 17,158 | 100.0 |

Illinois 29th State House District General Election, 2018
| Party | Candidate | Votes | % |
|---|---|---|---|
| Democratic | Thaddeus Jones (incumbent) | 33,109 | 100.0 |
| Total votes | | 33,109 | 100.0 |

Illinois 29th State House District Democratic Primary, 2020
| Party | Candidate | Votes | % |
|---|---|---|---|
| Democratic | Thaddeus Jones (incumbent) | 10,820 | 54.45 |
| Democratic | DeAndre Tillman | 9,053 | 45.55 |
| Total votes | | 19,873 | 100.0 |

== See also ==
- List of first African-American mayors
