= Richard F. Kelly =

American politician

Richard Francis "Dick" Kelly, Jr. (October 12, 1936 – July 11, 2015) was an American politician and businessman.

Born in Chicago, Illinois, Kelly graduated from Tilden High School. He then received his bachelor's degree from Governors State University. Kelly also went to Wilson Junior College, DePaul University and the American Institute of Banking. He served in the Illinois National Guard. Kelly worked at Mid America National Bank in Chicago, Illinois. Kelly served in the Illinois House of Representatives from 1979 to 1983 and then served in the Illinois State Senate from 1983 to 1993. Kelly was a Democrat. Kelly died at his home in Oak Forest, Illinois.
