= Robin Kelly =

American politician (born 1956)

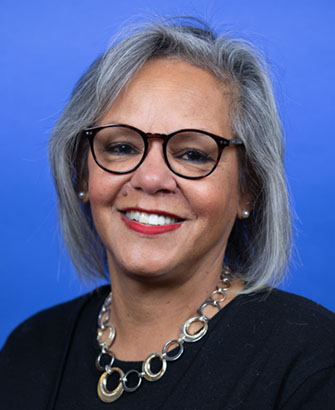
- Official portrait, 2022

Member of the U.S. House of Representatives from Illinois's 2nd district
- In office April 11, 2013 – January 3, 2027
- Preceded by: Jesse Jackson Jr.
- Succeeded by: Donna Miller

Chair of the Illinois Democratic Party
- In office March 3, 2021 – July 30, 2022
- Preceded by: Karen Yarbrough (acting)
- Succeeded by: Elizabeth Hernandez

Member of the Illinois House of Representatives from the 38th district
- In office January 8, 2003 – January 12, 2007
- Preceded by: Harold Murphy
- Succeeded by: Al Riley

Personal details
- Born: Robin Lynne Kelly; April 30, 1956 (age 70) New York City, New York, U.S.
- Party: Democratic
- Spouse: Nathaniel Horn (m. 2003; died 2023)
- Children: 2
- Education: Bradley University (BA, MA); Northern Illinois University (PhD)
- Website: House website Campaign website

Robin Lynne Kelly (born April 30, 1956) is an American politician serving as the U.S. representative for Illinois's 2nd congressional district since 2013. A member of the Democratic Party, Kelly served in the Illinois House of Representatives from 2003 to 2007. She then served as chief of staff for Illinois State Treasurer Alexi Giannoulias until 2010. She was the 2010 Democratic nominee for state treasurer, but lost the general election. Before running for Congress, Kelly served as the Cook County chief administrative officer. After winning the Democratic primary, she won the 2013 special election to succeed Jesse Jackson Jr. in the U.S. House of Representatives.

On May 6, 2025, Kelly announced she would be retiring to run for the United States Senate in 2026, being vacated by the retiring incumbent Dick Durbin. She placed third in the primary, losing to Juliana Stratton.

== Early life and education ==
The daughter of a grocer, Robin Lynne Kelly was born in Harlem on April 30, 1956. Hoping to become a child psychologist, she attended Bradley University in Peoria, Illinois, where she joined Sigma Gamma Rho sorority. At Bradley, she obtained her Bachelor of Arts in psychology (1977/1978) and her Master of Arts in counseling (1982). While in Peoria, she directed a "crisis nursery" and worked in a hospital.

Kelly earned her Doctor of Philosophy in political science from Northern Illinois University in 2004.

== Early career ==
From 1992 through 2006, Kelly served as a director of community affairs in Matteson.

=== Illinois House of Representatives (2003-2007) ===
==== Elections ====
In 2002, Kelly defeated a ten-year incumbent Illinois state representative in the Democratic primary. In November, she defeated Republican Kitty Watson, 81%–19%.

In 2004, she won reelection to a second term, defeating Republican Jack McInerney, 86%–14%. In 2006, she won reelection to a third term unopposed.

==== Committee assignments ====
- Appropriations-Human Services
- Housing & Urban Development
- International Trade & Commerce
- Local Government
- Mass Transit (Vice Chair)
- Para-transit
- Whole

=== State and county government ===
In January 2007, Kelly resigned her House seat to become chief of staff to Illinois Treasurer Alexi Giannoulias. She was the first African-American woman to serve as chief of staff to an elected constitutional statewide officeholder. Kelly was appointed Cook County President Toni Preckwinkle's chief administrative officer in 2011.

=== 2010 Illinois treasurer election ===
In 2010, Kelly ran for Illinois treasurer. In the Democratic primary, she defeated founding member and senior executive of the Transportation Security Administration Justin Oberman, 58%–42%. She won most of the counties in the state, including Cook County with 59% of the vote.

In the November general election, Republican State Senator Dan Rutherford defeated her 50%–45%. She won just six of the state's 102 counties: Cook (62%), Alexander (52%), Gallatin (51%), St. Clair (50%), Calhoun (49%), and Rock Island (48%).

== U.S. House of Representatives (2013-present) ==
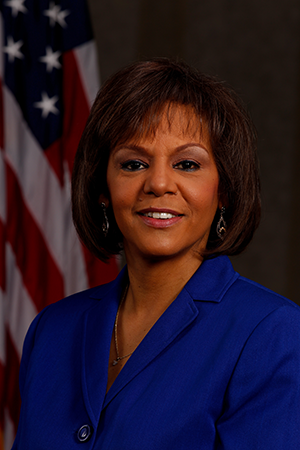
Kelly during the 113th Congress

=== 2013 congressional election ===
Kelly entered the field for Illinois's 2nd congressional district after Democrat Jesse Jackson Jr. resigned three weeks after being elected to a tenth term. On February 11, 2013, two Chicago-based Democratic congressmen, Bobby Rush and Danny Davis, endorsed her.

On February 13, U.S. Representative Jan Schakowsky endorsed Kelly. A few days later, New York City Mayor Michael Bloomberg endorsed her and committed $2 million in TV ads supporting her by highlighting Kelly's position on gun control. She was also endorsed by the Chicago Tribune. On February 17, State Senator Toi Hutchinson decided to drop out to endorse Kelly.

On February 26, Kelly won the Democratic primary in the heavily Democratic, Black-majority district with 52% of the vote. In the April 9 general election, she defeated Republican community activist Paul McKinley and a variety of independent candidates with around 71% of the vote.

=== Tenure ===
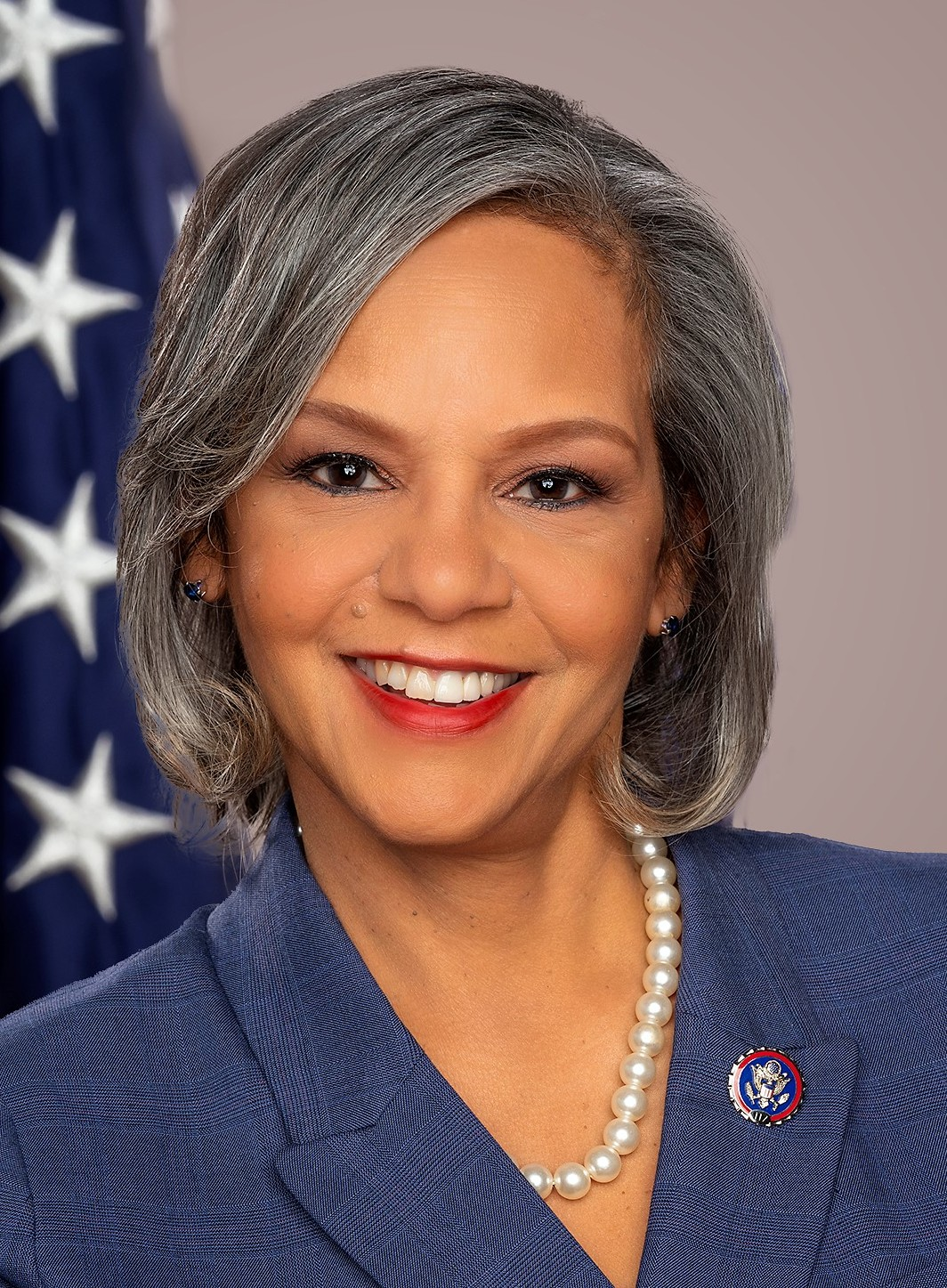
Kelly during the 117th Congress

Kelly took office on April 9, 2013, and was sworn in on April 11.

=== Committee assignments ===
For the 119th Congress:

- Committee on Energy and Commerce
  - Subcommittee on Commerce, Manufacturing, and Trade
  - Subcommittee on Communications and Technology
  - Subcommittee on Health

=== Caucus memberships ===
- Congressional Black Caucus
- Congressional Equality Caucus
- Medicare for All Caucus

== 2026 U.S. Senate candidacy ==
On May 6, 2025, Kelly announced she would be retiring to run for the United States Senate in 2026, being vacated by the retiring incumbent Dick Durbin. Illinois Governor JB Pritzker and his allies allegedly discouraged Kelly to run, though he denied the claims. It was noted that Kelly was one of several Black women running for US Senate in 2026: including Juliana Stratton of Illinois, Pamela Stevenson of Kentucky and Catherine Fleming Bruce of South Carolina.

Kelly ended up placing third in the Democratic primary to Illinois Lieutenant Governor Juliana Stratton and her colleague United States Representative Raja Krishnamoorthi, garnering only 18.3% of the vote.

== Political positions ==
Kelly voted with President Joe Biden's stated position 100% of the time in the 117th Congress, according to a FiveThirtyEight analysis.

=== Syria ===
In 2023, Kelly was among 56 Democrats to vote in favor of H.Con.Res. 21, which directed President Joe Biden to remove U.S. troops from Syria within 180 days.

== Personal life ==
Kelly lived in the Chicago suburb of Matteson, in a home she shared with her husband, Nathaniel Horn, until his death in August 2023. She currently resides in Lynwood. Kelly is a nondenominational Protestant.

== Electoral history ==
Democratic primary for the 2002 Illinois 38th House district election
Party	Candidate	Votes	%
Democratic	Robin Kelly	10,870	56.04
Democratic	Harold Murphy (incumbent)	8,526	43.96
Total votes		19,396	100.0

2002 Illinois 38th House district election
Party	Candidate	Votes	%
Democratic	Robin Kelly	26,739	80.95
Republican	Catherine (Kitty) Watson	6,292	19.05
Total votes		33,031	100.0

Democratic primary for the 2004 Illinois 38th House district election
Party	Candidate	Votes	%
Democratic	Robin Kelly (incumbent)	16,028	81.74
Democratic	Jonathan J. Jordan	3,580	18.26
Total votes		19,608	100.0

2004 Illinois 38th House district election
Party	Candidate	Votes	%
Democratic	Robin Kelly (incumbent)	41,837	86.15
Republican	Jack McInerney	6,727	13.85
Total votes		48,564	100.0

2006 Illinois 38th House district election
Party	Candidate	Votes	%
Democratic	Robin Kelly (incumbent)	30,862	100.0
Total votes		30,862	100.0

Democratic primary for the 2010 Illinois State Treasurer election
Party	Candidate	Votes	%
Democratic	Robin Kelly	472,494	57.92
Democratic	Justin P. Oberman	343,307	42.08
Total votes		815,801	100.0

2010 Illinois State Treasurer election
Party	Candidate	Votes	%
Republican	Dan Rutherford	1,811,293	49.68
Democratic	Robin Kelly	1,650,244	45.26
Green	Scott K. Summers	115,772	3.18
Libertarian	James Pauly	68,803	1.89
Total votes		3,646,112	100.0

Democratic primary for the 2013 Illinois 2nd congressional district special election
Party	Candidate	Votes	%
Democratic	Robin Kelly	31,079	53.27
Democratic	Debbie Halvorson	14,650	25.11
Democratic	Anthony Beale	6,457	11.07
Democratic	Joyce W. Washington	2,563	4.39
Democratic	Ernest B. Fenton	1,545	2.65
Democratic	Anthony W. Williams	641	1.10
Democratic	Mel "Mr" Reynolds	459	0.79
Democratic	Clifford J. Eagleton	207	0.35
Democratic	Fatimah N. Muhammad	194	0.33
Democratic	Gregory Haynes	144	0.25
Democratic	Larry D. Pickens	127	0.22
Democratic	John Blyth	104	0.18
Democratic	Victor Jonathan	91	0.16
Democratic	Charles Rayburn	74	0.13
Democratic	Denise Anita Hill	4	0.01
Total votes		58,339	100.0

2013 Illinois 2nd congressional district special election
Party	Candidate	Votes	%
Democratic	Robin Kelly	58,834	70.72
Republican	Paul McKinley	18,387	22.10
Independent	Elizabeth "Liz" Pahlke	2,525	3.04
Green	LeAlan M. Jones	1,531	1.84
Independent	Marcus Lewis	1,359	1.63
Independent	Curtiss Llong Bey	548	0.66
Write-in votes	Steve Piekarczyk	9	0.01
Total votes		83,193	100.0

2014 Illinois 2nd congressional district election
Party	Candidate	Votes	%
Democratic	Robin Kelly (incumbent)	160,337	78.49
Republican	Eric M. Wallace	43,799	21.44
Write-in votes	Marcus Lewis	130	0.06
Total votes		204,266	100.0

Democratic primary for the 2016 Illinois 2nd congressional district election
Party	Candidate	Votes	%
Democratic	Robin Kelly (incumbent)	115,752	73.92
Democratic	Marcus Lewis	25,280	16.14
Democratic	Charles Rayburn	9,559	6.10
Democratic	Dorian C. L. Myrickes	6,002	3.83
Total votes		156,593	100.0

2016 Illinois 2nd congressional district election
Party	Candidate	Votes	%
Democratic	Robin Kelly (incumbent)	235,051	79.81
Republican	John F. Morrow	59,471	20.19
Total votes		294,522	100.0

Democratic primary for the 2018 Illinois 2nd congressional district election
Party	Candidate	Votes	%
Democratic	Robin Kelly (incumbent)	80,659	82.05
Democratic	Marcus Lewis	17,640	17.95
Total votes		98,299	100.0

2018 Illinois 2nd congressional district election
Party	Candidate	Votes	%
Democratic	Robin Kelly (incumbent)	190,684	81.06
Republican	David Merkle	44,567	18.94
Total votes		235,251	100.0

2020 Illinois 2nd congressional district election
Party	Candidate	Votes	%
Democratic	Robin Kelly (incumbent)	234,896	78.81
Republican	Theresa Raborn	63,142	21.19
Total votes		298,038	100.0

2022 Illinois 2nd congressional district election
Party	Candidate	Votes	%
Democratic	Robin Kelly (incumbent)	140,414	67.13
Republican	Thomas Lynch	68,761	32.87
Total votes		209,175	100.0

2024 Illinois 2nd congressional district election
Party	Candidate	Votes	%
Democratic	Robin Kelly (incumbent)	195,777	67.55
Republican	Ashley Ramos	94,004	32.43
Write-in		62	0.02
Total votes		289,843	100.0

United States Senate election in Illinois Democratic Primary, 2026
Party	Candidate	Votes	%
Democratic	Juliana Stratton	507,689	40.4
Democratic	Raja Krishnamoorthi	411,150	32.7
Democratic	Robin Kelly	229,788	18.3
Democratic	Kevin Ryan	61,914	4.9
Democratic	Bryan Maxwell	10,070	0.8
Democratic	Sean Brown	8,122	0.6
Democratic	Awisi Bustos	8,020	0.6
Democratic	Christopher Swann	7,896	0.6
Democratic	Jonathan Dean	6,762	0.5
Democratic	Steve Botsford	5,411	0.4
Total votes		1,256,822	100.0

== See also ==
- List of African-American United States representatives
- Women in the United States House of Representatives
- Black women in American politics

Party political offices
Preceded by Alexi Giannoulias	Democratic nominee for Treasurer of Illinois; 2010	Succeeded by Mike Frerichs
Preceded by Karen Yarbrough; Acting	Chair of the Illinois Democratic Party; 2021–2022	Succeeded by Elizabeth Hernandez
U.S. House of Representatives
Preceded by Jesse Jackson Jr.	Member of the U.S. House of Representatives from Illinois's 2nd congressional district 2013–present	Incumbent
U.S. order of precedence (ceremonial)
Preceded by Roger Williams	United States representatives by seniority 119th	Succeeded by Jason Smith
