= Thornton Township, Illinois =

Thornton Township
- Township
- Seal

- Location in Cook County

- Cook County's location in Illinois
- Coordinates: 41°35′00″N 87°37′00″W
- Country: United States
- State: Illinois
- County: Cook
- Established: 1850

Government
  - Type: Township
  - Body: Township Board
  - Supervisor: Napoleon Harris (Democrat)
  - Trustee: Stephanie Wiedeman
  - Trustee: Darlene Gray Everett
  - Trustee: Christopher D. Gonzalez
  - Trustee: Carmen Carlisle
  - Clerk: Loretta C. Wells

Area
  - Total: 122.8 km^{2} (47.42 sq mi)
  - Land: 121.5 km^{2} (46.93 sq mi)
  - Water: 1.3 km^{2} (0.49 sq mi)
- Elevation: 189 m (620 ft)

Population (2020)
  - Total: 157,865
  - Density: 1,299/km^{2} (3,364/sq mi)
- Time zone: UTC-6 (CST)
  - Summer (DST): UTC-5 (CDT)
- ZIP codes: 60406, 60409, 60419, 60425, 60426, 60429, 60430, 60438, 60469, 60473, 60476, 60633, 60827
- Area code: 708
- FIPS code: 17-031-75198
- GNIS feature ID: 0422238
- Website: thorntontownship.com

Thornton Township is one of 29 townships in Cook County, Illinois. As of the 2020 census, its population was 157,865.

Incorporated in 1850, it is located immediately south of the city of Chicago. It is the second most populous township in Illinois as of the 2020 census, after Rockford Township (pop. 170,478) in Winnebago County.

The village of South Holland serves as the governmental seat of Thornton Township. The township is named after the village of Thornton, located in the south central portion of the township. Many parts of the township carry names inspired by the village's name, including the three high schools of Thornton Township District 205: Thornton Township High School in Harvey; Thornwood High School in South Holland; Thornridge High School in Dolton; Thornton Fractional South High School in Lansing; Thornton Fractional North High School in Calumet City and Thornton Fractional Center for Academics and Technology also in Calumet City.

== Geography ==
According to the United States Census Bureau, Thornton Township covers an area of 47.42 square miles (122.81 km^{2}); of this, 46.93 square miles (121.54 km^{2}) is land and 0.49 square miles (1.27 km^{2}) (1.03 percent) is water.

=== Boundaries ===
Thornton Township is bordered by Western Avenue on the west, 138th Street on the north, the Indiana state line on the east, and 183rd/186th Street on the south.

=== Cities and villages ===
- Blue Island (southern edge)
- Burnham
- Calumet City
- Dixmoor
- Dolton
- East Hazel Crest
- Glenwood (northern quarter)
- Harvey (vast majority)
- Hazel Crest (small portion)
- Homewood (northeast half)
- Lansing (northern half)
- Markham (eastern quarter)
- Phoenix
- Posen (eastern edge)
- Riverdale (southern half)
- South Holland
- Thornton

=== Unincorporated Towns ===
- Berger at 41.623646°N 87.591988°W
- Bernice at 41.579201°N 87.548096°W
- Globe at 41.597504°N 87.559311°W
- Greenwood at 41.614201°N 87.589211°W
- North Harvey at 41.625591°N 87.636711°W
- Oakglen at 41.563091°N 87.558372°W
- Schrum at 41.601147°N 87.548935°W
- South Harvey at 41.582535°N 87.663101°W
- Thornton Junction at 41.589198°N 87.606994°W
- West Harvey at 41.622536°N 87.65921°W

=== Adjacent townships ===
- North Township, Lake Co., Indiana (east)
- Bloom Township (south)
- Rich Township (southwest)
- Bremen Township (west)
- Calumet Township (northwest)
- Worth Township (northwest)

=== Cemeteries ===
The township contains these 11 cemeteries: Berger, First Reformed of Lansing, Glen Oak, Hazelwood, Holy Cross Catholic, Homewood Memorial Gardens, Mount Forest, Oak Lawn, Oak Ridge, Oakland and Washington Memory Gardens.

=== Major highways ===
- Interstate 57
- Interstate 80
- Interstate 94
- Interstate 294
- U.S. Route 6
- Illinois Route 1
- Illinois Route 83
- Illinois Route 394

=== Airports and landing strips ===
- Harvey Police Department Heliport
- Ingalls Memorial Hospital Heliport

=== Lakes ===
- Green Lake
- Homewood Lake
- Izaak Walton Lake
- Lake Cottage Grove
- Powder Horn Lake
- Spring Lake
- Swets Lake
- Wampum Lake

=== Forest Preserves ===
The following are all part of the Cook County Forest Preserves:

- Brownell Woods
- Burnham Woods
- Calumet Woods
- Green Lake Woods
- Kickapoo Meadows
- Shabbona Woods
- Wampum Lake Woods
- Wentworth Woods

=== Colleges ===
- South Suburban College

== Demographics ==
Thornton Township, Illinois – Racial and ethnic composition Note: the US Census treats Hispanic/Latino as an ethnic category. This table excludes Latinos from the racial categories and assigns them to a separate category. Hispanics/Latinos may be of any race.
| Race / Ethnicity (NH = Non-Hispanic) | Pop 2000 | Pop 2010 | Pop 2020 | % 2000 | % 2010 | % 2020 |
|---|---|---|---|---|---|---|
| White alone (NH) | 60,828 | 31,955 | 19,176 | 33.64% | 18.87% | 12.15% |
| Black or African American alone (NH) | 103,545 | 115,259 | 109,534 | 57.27% | 68.07% | 69.38% |
| Native American or Alaska Native alone (NH) | 210 | 264 | 188 | 0.12% | 0.16% | 0.12% |
| Asian alone (NH) | 1,010 | 825 | 884 | 0.56% | 0.49% | 0.56% |
| Native Hawaiian or Pacific Islander alone (NH) | 50 | 31 | 28 | 0.04% | 0.02% | 0.02% |
| Other race alone (NH) | 184 | 182 | 692 | 0.10% | 0.11% | 0.44% |
| Mixed race or Multiracial (NH) | 2,077 | 2,098 | 3,391 | 1.15% | 1.24% | 2.15% |
| Hispanic or Latino (any race) | 12,898 | 18,712 | 23,972 | 7.13% | 11.05% | 15.19% |
| Total | 180,802 | 169,326 | 157,865 | 100.00% | 100.00% | 100.00% |

Historical population
| Census | Pop. | Note | %± |
|---|---|---|---|
| 1930 | 50,650 | | — |
| 1940 | 56,395 | | 11.3% |
| 1950 | 76,819 | | 36.2% |
| 1960 | 138,444 | | 80.2% |
| 1970 | 188,067 | | 35.8% |
| 1980 | 191,359 | | 1.8% |
| 1990 | 175,896 | | −8.1% |
| 2000 | 180,717 | | 2.7% |
| 2010 | 169,326 | | −6.3% |
| 2020 | 157,865 | | −6.8% |
http://censusviewer.com/city/IL/Thornton

As of the 2020 census there were 157,865 people, 60,889 households, and 38,705 families residing in the township. The population density was 3,331.75 inhabitants per square mile (1,286.40/km^{2}). There were 66,938 housing units at an average density of 1,412.73 per square mile (545.46/km^{2}). The racial makeup of the township was 14.11% White, 69.94% African American, 0.52% Native American, 0.59% Asian, 0.03% Pacific Islander, 8.67% from other races, and 6.14% from two or more races. Hispanic or Latino of any race were 15.19% of the population.

There were 60,889 households, out of which 32.00% had children under the age of 18 living with them, 29.69% were married couples living together, 27.76% had a female householder with no spouse present, and 36.43% were non-families. 33.20% of all households were made up of individuals, and 13.30% had someone living alone who was 65 years of age or older. The average household size was 2.69 and the average family size was 3.47.

The township's age distribution consisted of 25.1% under the age of 18, 9.8% from 18 to 24, 24.3% from 25 to 44, 26.5% from 45 to 64, and 14.3% who were 65 years of age or older. The median age was 37.2 years. For every 100 females, there were 84.9 males. For every 100 females age 18 and over, there were 79.8 males.

The median income for a household in the township was $50,245, and the median income for a family was $58,329. Males had a median income of $36,909 versus $31,320 for females. The per capita income for the township was $23,853. About 16.3% of families and 20.0% of the population were below the poverty line, including 32.5% of those under age 18 and 11.5% of those age 65 or over.

== Political districts ==
- Illinois's 1st congressional district
- Illinois's 2nd congressional district
- State House District 28
- State House District 29
- State House District 30
- State House District 33
- State House District 34
- State Senate District 14
- State Senate District 15
- State Senate District 17

== See also ==
- Tiffany Henyard, former township supervisor (2022–2025)
- Frank Zuccarelli, former township supervisor (1993–2022)
- Pope Leo XIV, who grew up in the township
