= Dolton, Illinois =

Village in Illinois, United States

- Village
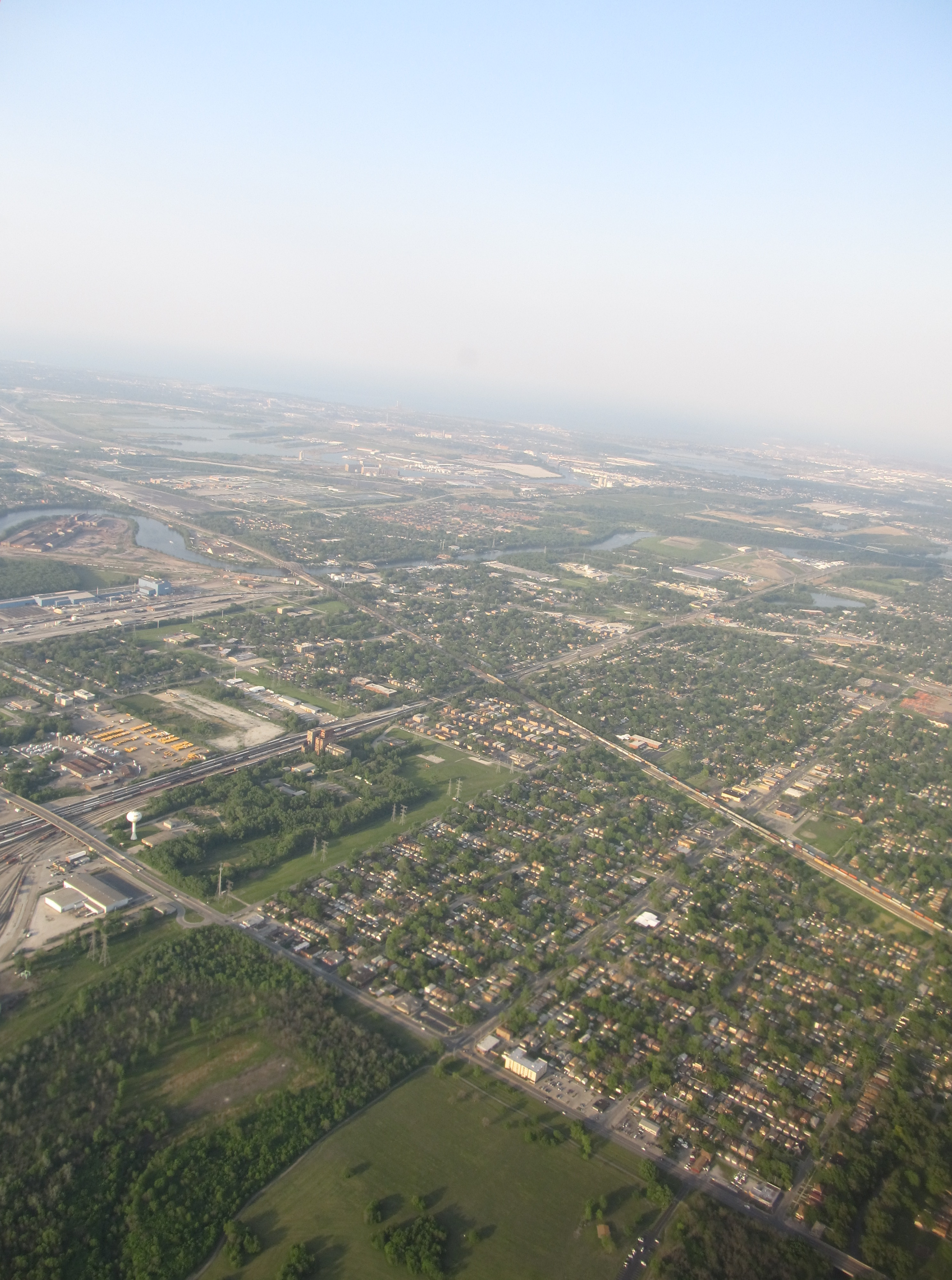
- Aerial view of Dolton (2012)

- Flag Seal
- Motto: "A community working together"
- Location of Dolton in Cook County

- Location within Greater Chicago Location within Illinois Location within the United States
- Coordinates: 41°37′39″N 87°35′55″W
- Country: United States
- State: Illinois
- County: Cook
- Township: Thornton
- Incorporated: 1893

Government
  - Type: Mayor–council
  - Mayor: Jason House (D)

Area
  - Total: 4.69 sq mi (12.14 km^{2})
  - Land: 4.57 sq mi (11.84 km^{2})
  - Water: 0.12 sq mi (0.30 km^{2}) 2.56%

Population (2020)
  - Total: 21,426
  - Density: 4,687.7/sq mi (1,809.94/km^{2})
- Time zone: UTC−06:00 (CST)
  - Summer (DST): UTC−05:00 (CDT)
- ZIP Code: 60419
- Area code(s): 708
- FIPS code: 17-20292
- Website: vodolton.org

Dolton (/ˈdɔːltən/) is a village and south suburb in Thornton Township, Cook County, Illinois, United States. The population was 21,426 at the 2020 census. Dolton is located just west of the expressway Interstate 94 and immediately south of the city limits of Chicago. It is bordered by Chicago to the north, Riverdale and Harvey to the west, South Holland to the south, and Calumet City to the east.

== History ==
A post office has been in operation in Dolton since 1854. The village was named for a family of early settlers. The villages of Dolton and nearby Riverdale were effectively one community until each incorporated separately in 1892.

== Geography ==
In 2021, Dolton was an area of 4.69 square miles (12.15 km^{2}), of which 4.57 square miles (11.84 km^{2}) (or 97.50%) is land and 0.12 square miles (0.31 km^{2}) (or 2.50%) is water.

== Demographics ==
Historical population
Census	Pop.	Note	%±
1880	448		—
1890	1,110		147.8%
1900	1,229		10.7%
1910	1,869		52.1%
1920	2,076		11.1%
1930	2,923		40.8%
1940	3,058		4.6%
1950	5,338		74.6%
1960	18,746		251.2%
1970	25,937		38.4%
1980	24,766		−4.5%
1990	23,956		−3.3%
2000	25,614		6.9%
2010	23,153		−9.6%
2020	21,426		−7.5%
U.S. Decennial Census; 2010 2020

=== Racial and ethnic composition ===
Dolton village, Illinois – Racial and ethnic composition Note: the US Census treats Hispanic/Latino as an ethnic category. This table excludes Latinos from the racial categories and assigns them to a separate category. Hispanics/Latinos may be of any race.
Race / Ethnicity (NH = Non-Hispanic)	Pop 1980	Pop 1990	Pop 2000	Pop 2010	Pop 2020	% 1980	% 1990	% 2000	% 2010	% 2020
White alone (NH)	23,265	13,429	3,390	1,226	598	93.94%	56.12%	13.23%	5.30%	2.79%
Black or African American alone (NH)	483	9,044	20,973	20,932	19,322	1.95%	37.79%	81.88%	90.41%	90.18%
Native American or Alaska Native alone (NH)	17	52	28	14	19	0.07%	0.22%	0.11%	0.06%	0.09%
Asian alone (NH)	221	313	144	68	38	0.89%	1.31%	0.56%	0.29%	0.18%
Native Hawaiian or Pacific Islander alone (NH)	1	25	4	3	1	0.00%	0.10%	0.02%	0.01%	0.00%
Other race alone (NH)	48	6	34	24	107	0.19%	0.03%	0.13%	0.10%	0.50%
Mixed race or Multiracial (NH)	x	x	250	264	404	x	x	0.98%	1.14%	1.89%
Hispanic or Latino (any race)	731	1,061	791	622	937	2.95%	4.43%	3.09%	2.69%	4.37%
Total	24,766	23,930	25,614	23,153	21,426	100.00%	100.00%	100.00%	100.00%	100.00%

=== 2020 census ===
As of the 2020 census, Dolton had a population of 21,426, with 7,766 households and 5,361 families.

The median age was 39.5 years. 22.9% of residents were under the age of 18 and 15.6% were 65 years of age or older. For every 100 females, there were 85.1 males, and for every 100 females age 18 and over, there were 78.8 males age 18 and over. 100.0% of residents lived in urban areas, while 0.0% lived in rural areas.

Among households in Dolton, 33.1% had children under the age of 18 living in them. 28.9% were married-couple households, 17.6% were households with a male householder and no spouse or partner present, and 47.2% were households with a female householder and no spouse or partner present. About 26.3% of all households were made up of individuals, and 10.1% had someone living alone who was 65 years of age or older.

There were 8,768 housing units, of which 11.4% were vacant. The homeowner vacancy rate was 4.1% and the rental vacancy rate was 12.1%. The population density was 4,570.39 inhabitants per square mile (1,764.64/km^{2}), and housing density was 1,870.31 per square mile (722.13/km^{2}).

=== Demographic estimates ===
The average household size was 3.44 and the average family size was 2.78.

The village's age distribution included 10.7% from 18 to 24, 21.8% from 25 to 44, and 27% from 45 to 64.

=== Income and poverty ===
The median income for a household in the village was $50,237. The median income for a family was $57,634. Males had a median income of $33,939 versus $33,354 for females. The per capita income for the village was $22,135. About 15.4% of families and 22.1% of the population were below the poverty line, including 42.8% of those under age 18 and 13.2% of those age 65 or over.

== Arts and culture ==
Dolton Public Library opened in 1954. First located inside the Village Hall, it contained 5,000 books and magazines. The library moved to a new facility in 1967 and featured a collection of 35,000 books.

== Parks and recreation ==
Dolton features over 120 acres (49 ha) of recreational properties, and 11 parks. A recreational center contains a gymnasium and fitness room.

== Government ==
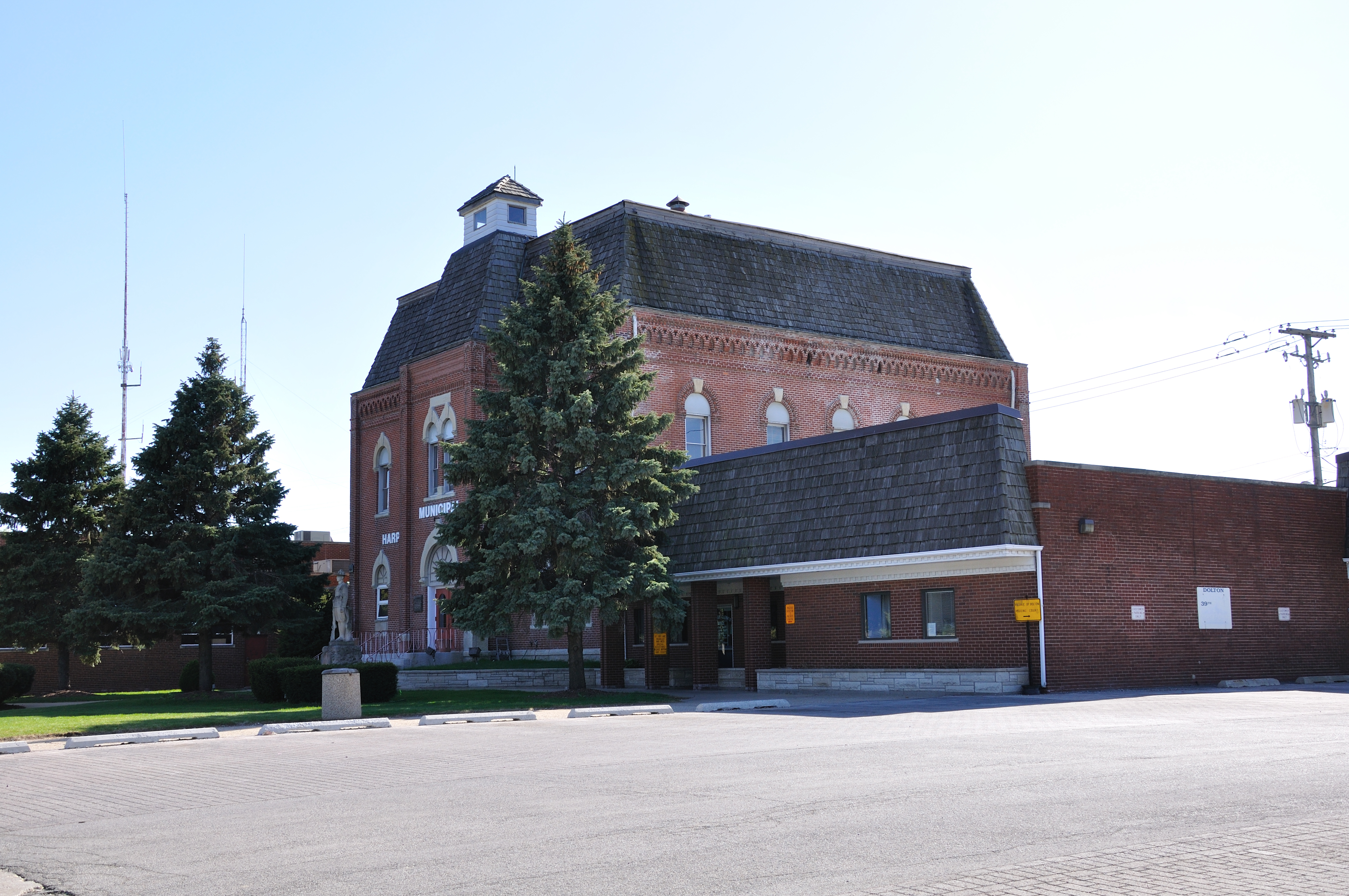
Village Hall

Most of the village is part of the Dolton Park District, with a small portion served by the Calumet Memorial Park District. The entire village is part of the Dolton Public Library District and the Metropolitan Water Reclamation District.

=== Mayors ===
Mayors of Dolton, Illinois

Image	Mayor	Years	Notes
	Fred J. Ehlert	1913–1919	
	Charles H. Smythe	1919–1923	
	William C. Krueger	1923–1927	
	John Harms Jr.	1927–1929	
	Charles Dickelman	1929–1935	
	Ira Hastings	1935–1957	
	Fred Kasten	1957–1965	
	Albert J. Ohlsen	1965	Served the last six months of mayor Kasten's term
	Thomas Harper	1965–1969	
	Norman MacKay	1969–1985	
	J. Michael Peck	1985–1993	
	Donald Hart	1993–1997	
	William Shaw	1997–2008	Died in office First African-American mayor.
	Ronnie Lewis	2008–2013	Acting in 2008; elected to full term in 2009
	Riley H. Rogers	2013–2021	
	Tiffany Henyard	2021–2025	
	Jason House	2025–present	

=== Allegations of misspending and harassment ===
In November 2023, WGN News published a two-part series alleging widespread misspending and harassment of political opponents by the mayor, Tiffany Henyard.

On February 20, 2024, it was reported that the Federal Bureau of Investigation had launched a probe into alleged misconduct by Mayor Henyard.

== Education ==
The entire village is part of South Suburban Community College District 510.

== Infrastructure ==
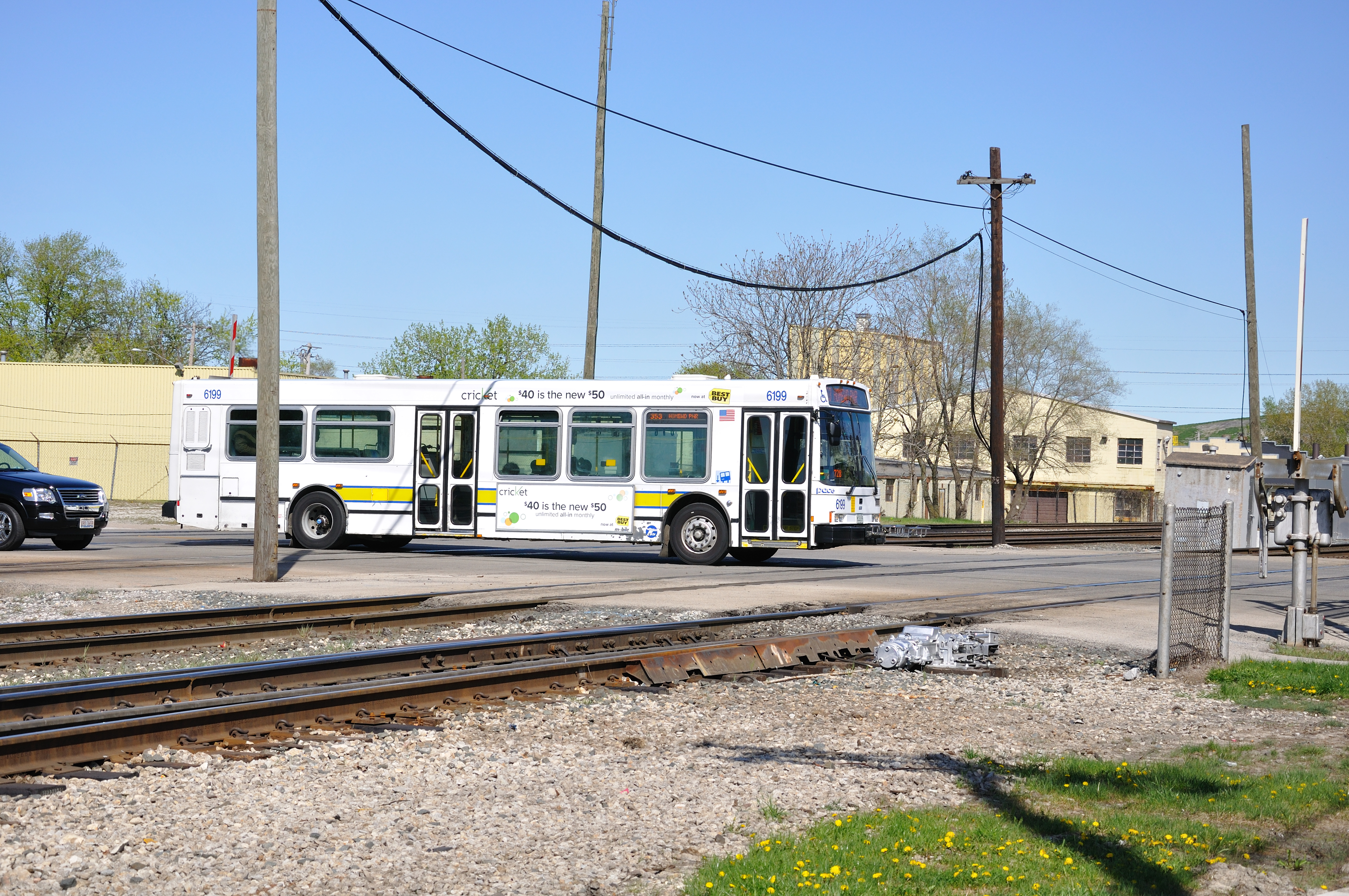
Pace bus in Dolton

=== Transportation ===
Pace provides bus service on multiple routes connecting Dolton to destinations across the Southland.

== Notable buildings ==
- Pope Leo XIV childhood home

== Notable people ==
- Ronnie Baker Brooks, musician
- Susan Carlson, broadcast journalist and news anchor
- Kevin Duckworth, professional basketball player
- Nelsan Ellis, actor who played Lafayette Reynolds in True Blood
- Reggie Hayward, professional football player
- Andrew Holmes, activist and politician
- Perry Johnson, businessman
- Pope Leo XIV, grew up in Dolton
- Jane Lynch, entertainer
- Derek Needham, professional basketball player
- Richard Roeper, film critic; grew up in Dolton
- William Shaw, Illinois state legislator and mayor of Dolton
- Pops Staples, musician who lived many years in Dolton
- R. Bruce Waddell, politician
