= South Suburban College =

Community college in South Holland, Illinois, U.S.

- Former names: Thornton Junior College, Thornton Community College
- Type: Public community college
- Established: 1927; 99 years ago
- President: Lynette D. Stokes
- Students: 4,180
- Location: South Holland, Illinois, United States; 41°36′15″N 87°37′11″W
- Campus: South Holland and Oak Forest
- Colors: Reflex Blue and White
- Nickname: Bulldogs
- Sporting affiliations: NJCAA
- Website: www.ssc.edu

South Suburban College is a public community college in South Holland, Illinois. It has a second campus in Oak Forest, Illinois.

== History ==
South Suburban College was founded in 1927 as Thornton Junior College. At that time, the college was an extension of Thornton Township High School in Harvey, Illinois. The Illinois Community College Act of 1965 created Community College District 510 and enlarged the area served to include Thornton Township High Schools District 205, Thornton Fractional Township High School District 215, and Bremen High School District 228.

In 1969, the name was changed to Thornton Community College to emphasize the comprehensive mission of the college. The college moved into its existing main campus facilities in South Holland in 1972.

In June 1988, the college's board of trustees voted to change the name of the institution to South Suburban College to more accurately reflect the geographic location of the college. To serve the western portion of the district and provide opportunities for district residents to complete a four-year degree, the Oak Forest Center was opened in Oak Forest in 1992.

== Campus ==
The main campus is situated in South Holland, Illinois with a second campus, the Oak Forest Center located in Oak Forest, Illinois.

== Athletics ==
Men's athletics

- Basketball
- Baseball
- Soccer

Women's athletics

- Basketball
- Soccer
- Softball
- Volleyball

== Notable alumni ==
- Tom Baldwin - NFL player, New York Jets
- Tim Byrdak, Major League Baseball player
- Herb Coleman, American player of gridiron football
- Ruth Johnson Colvin, Founder of the non-profit Literacy Volunteers of America, Inc., now called ProLiteracy Worldwide in Syracuse, New York in 1962
- King Von, Rapper
- Cliff Floyd, Major League Baseball player
- Rob Mackowiak, Major League Baseball player
- Ron Mahay, Major League Baseball player
- Julius Matos, Major League Baseball player
- Robert P. Regan, Illinois state representative and businessman
- R. Bruce Waddell, Illinois state representative and businessman
- Frank Zuccarelli, longtime supervisor of Thornton Township, Cook County, Illinois as well as longtime chair of the college's board of supervisors
