= Thornton, Illinois =

- Village
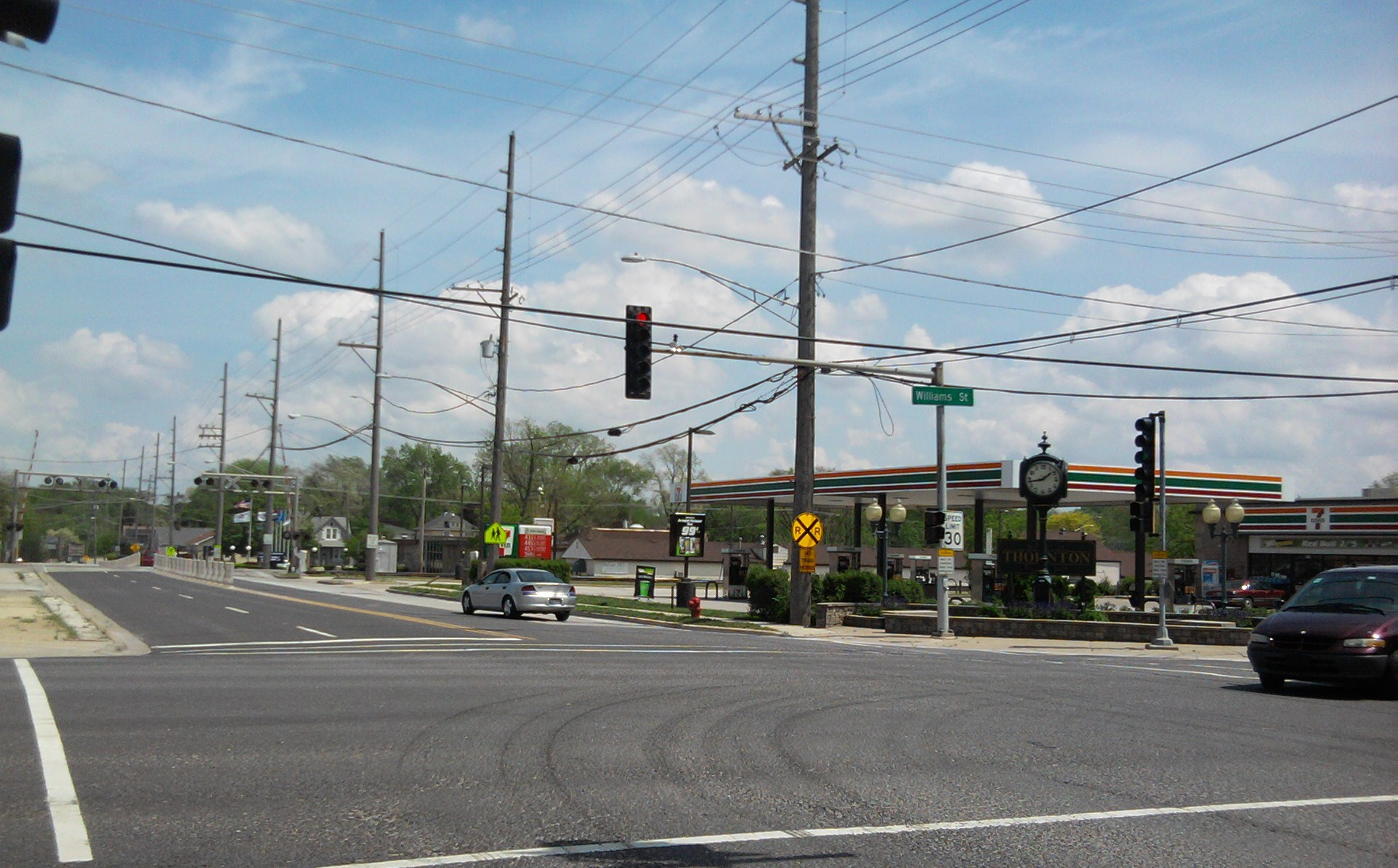
- Intersection of Margaret Street and Williams Street, looking east-southeast on Margaret Street towards railroad tracks

- Seal

- Location of Thornton in Cook County, Illinois.

- Location within Greater Chicago Location within Illinois Location within the United States
- Coordinates: 41°34′17″N 87°36′42″W
- Country: United States
- State: Illinois
- County: Cook
- Township: Thornton
- Founded: 1834
- Incorporated: 1900

Government
  - Type: Council-Trustee
  - Body: Board of Trustees
  - Village president: Joseph Pisarzewski (Acting)
  - Clerk: Nikki Kitakis

Area
  - Total: 2.40 sq mi (6.22 km^{2})
  - Land: 2.37 sq mi (6.15 km^{2})
  - Water: 0.027 sq mi (0.07 km^{2})
- Elevation: 620 ft (190 m)

Population (2020)
  - Total: 2,386
  - Density: 1,004.8/sq mi (387.96/km^{2})
- Time zone: UTC-6 (CST)
  - Summer (DST): UTC-5 (CDT)
- ZIP code: 60476
- Area code: 708
- FIPS code: 17-75185
- GNIS feature ID: 2399975
- Website: www.thorntonil.us

Thornton is a village in Cook County, Illinois, United States, and a south suburb of Chicago. The population was 2,386 at the 2020 census. Thornton is home to the Thornton Quarry, one of the largest quarries in the world.

== Geography ==
Thornton is located at 41°34′17″N 87°36′42″W (41.571484, -87.611743).

According to the 2021 census gazetteer files, Thornton has a total area of 2.40 square miles (6.22 km^{2}), of which 2.38 square miles (6.16 km^{2}) (or 98.92%) is land and 0.03 square miles (0.08 km^{2}) (or 1.08%) is water.

== Demographics ==
Historical population
Census	Pop.	Note	%±
1860	1,033		—
1870	301		−70.9%
1910	1,030		—
1920	767		−25.5%
1930	1,012		31.9%
1940	1,101		8.8%
1950	1,217		10.5%
1960	2,895		137.9%
1970	3,714		28.3%
1980	3,024		−18.6%
1990	2,778		−8.1%
2000	2,582		−7.1%
2010	2,338		−9.5%
2020	2,386		2.1%
U.S. Decennial Census; 2010 2020

=== Racial and ethnic composition ===
Thornton Village, Illinois – Racial and Ethnic Composition Note: the US Census treats Hispanic/Latino as an ethnic category. This table excludes Latinos from the racial categories and assigns them to a separate category. Hispanics/Latinos may be of any race.
Race / Ethnicity (NH = Non-Hispanic)	Pop 2000	Pop 2010	Pop 2020	% 2000	% 2010	% 2020
White alone (NH)	2,425	1,841	1,325	93.92%	78.74%	55.53%
Black or African American alone (NH)	21	219	528	0.81%	9.37%	22.13%
Native American or Alaska Native alone (NH)	2	2	3	0.08%	0.09%	0.13%
Asian alone (NH)	6	16	9	0.23%	0.68%	0.38%
Native Hawaiian or Pacific Islander alone (NH)	0	1	0	0.00%	0.04%	0.00%
Other race alone (NH)	0	1	8	0.00%	0.04%	0.34%
Mixed race or Multiracial (NH)	21	53	71	0.81%	2.27%	2.98%
Hispanic or Latino (any race)	107	205	442	4.14%	8.77%	18.52%
Total	2,582	2,338	2,386	100.00%	100.00%	100.00%

=== 2020 census ===
As of the 2020 census, Thornton had a population of 2,386. The median age was 44.1 years. 20.0% of residents were under the age of 18 and 20.1% were 65 years of age or older. For every 100 females there were 93.4 males, and for every 100 females age 18 and over there were 89.5 males.

The population density was 993.75 inhabitants per square mile (383.69/km^{2}), and there were 1,061 housing units at an average density of 441.90 per square mile (170.62/km^{2}). 100.0% of residents lived in urban areas, while 0.0% lived in rural areas.

There were 1,005 households in Thornton, and 591 families resided in the village. Of all households, 28.2% had children under the age of 18 living in them. 38.4% were married-couple households, 20.8% were households with a male householder and no spouse or partner present, and 33.9% were households with a female householder and no spouse or partner present. About 32.4% of all households were made up of individuals and 15.4% had someone living alone who was 65 years of age or older. The average household size was 3.07 and the average family size was 2.39.

Of the 1,061 housing units, 5.3% were vacant. The homeowner vacancy rate was 2.7% and the rental vacancy rate was 4.5%.

=== Income and poverty ===
The median income for a household in the village was $66,447, and the median income for a family was $85,375. Males had a median income of $41,890 versus $39,329 for females. The per capita income for the village was $32,251. About 2.7% of families and 8.0% of the population were below the poverty line, including 4.6% of those under age eighteen and 14.5% of those age sixty-five or over.

== Government ==
Thornton is in Illinois's 2nd congressional district.

== Transportation ==
Pace provides bus service on Route 353 connecting Thornton to destinations across the Southland.
