= Thornton Fractional North High School =

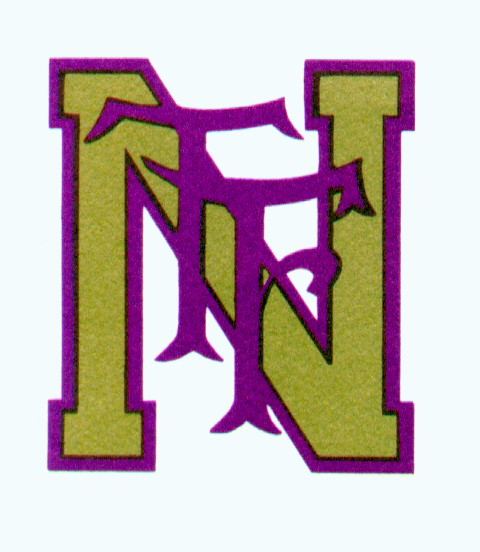

Location
- 755 Pulaski Road; Calumet City, Illinois 60409; United States; 41.6146°N 87.5452°W

Information
- Former name: Thornton Fractional Township High School
- School type: Public Secondary
- Motto: "Hardworking, Caring, Responsible, and Respectful."
- Established: 1926
- School district: Thornton Fractional HS 215
- Superintendent: John Robinzine
- CEEB code: 140475
- Principal: Brian Rucinski
- Faculty: 142
- Teaching staff: 207
- Grades: 9–12
- Gender: Coed
- Enrollment: 1,425 (2024-2025)
  - Grade 9: 345 students
  - Grade 10: 327 students
  - Grade 11: 351 students
  - Grade 12: 402 students
- Average class size: 21.5
- Campus size: 3 Acres
- Campus type: Suburban
- Colors: Purple; Gold
- Athletics conference: South Suburban Conference
- Mascot: Meteor-Man
- Nickname: Meteors
- Rival: Thornton Fractional South High School
- Accreditation: Illinois State Board of Education
- Newspaper: Thorntonian
- Yearbook: Chronoscope
- Communities served: Calumet City; Burnham
- Feeder schools: Burnham Elementary School; Lincoln Elementary School; Schrum Mem. Middle School; Wentworth Jr. High School
- Website: http://TFD215.org/North

Thornton Fractional North High School (T.F. North, TF North, TFN; formerly Thornton Fractional Township High School) is a Public Secondary school in Calumet City, Illinois. It first opened its doors in March 1926.

The school serves Calumet City and Burnham. T.F. North also serves over 1,700 students in grades 9–12. The school's boundaries are the City of Chicago on the North, Torrence Avenue on the West, the Indiana state line on the East, and the Little Calumet River to the South.

== History ==
Due to growth in the Calumet City–Lansing area, Thornton Fractional South High School was opened in 1959. The original high school that first opened in 1926 was renamed Thornton Fractional North High School. In 1963 and 1964, expansions to the 1936 building were completed.

== Academics ==
In 2010, T.F. North had an average composite ACT score of 18.0, an average class size of 21.6 Students, a 20.5 Student to Teacher Ratio, and graduated 92.8% of its Senior class. T.F. North has not made Adequate Yearly Progress (AYP) on the Prairie State Achievement Examination, a state test used in Illinois to fulfill the mandates of the federal No Child Left Behind Act. Overall, the school has not exceeded minimum expectations in reading, mathematics, and science. It has far exceeded graduation expectations with an 87% graduation rate.

== Athletics ==
The Athletics Director is Mr. DeVale Stubbs.

T.F. North competes in the South Suburban Conference and is a member of the Illinois High School Association (IHSA), the body which governs most sports and competitive activities in the state. Teams are stylized as the Meteors. School colors are Purple and Gold.

The school sponsors interscholastic teams for male and female students in badminton, baseball, basketball, bowling, cheerleading, cross country, dance team, football, golf, soccer, softball, tennis, track, volleyball, and wrestling.

== Activities ==
T.F. North offers various extracurricular activities. Some of these have won Illinois High School Association (IHSA) State Championships in the past, such as the Drama Club.

Other activities and clubs include: Adventure Club, Auto Collision, Auto Mechanics, Chess, Concert Band, Creative Arts Magazine, Cultural Diversity, Foreign Language Club, Gay-Straight Alliance (GSA), Integrated Cooperative Education (ICE), J.I.L.G., Jazz Ensemble, Jazz Choir, Marching Band, Mathletes, National Honor Society (NHS), Newspaper, Peer Mediators, Pep Club, S.A.D.D., Speech Team, Radio/TV Productions (Meteor Productions), Visual Arts, and Yearbook.

The following teams have placed in the top four of their respective state championship competitions sponsored by the IHSA:

- Debate: 2nd Place (1941–42, 1957–58)
- Speech (Individual): State Champions (1958–59)
- Speech (Team): State Champions (1943–44, 1957–58, 1958–59); 2nd Place (1940–41); 3rd Place (1941–42)

== Notable alumni ==
- John Jurkovic, Former NFL Defensive Lineman for the Green Bay Packers, Miami Dolphins, Jacksonville Jaguars, and Cleveland Browns. Currently an ESPN Radio 1000 afternoon drive host in Chicago, Illinois. Class of 1985.
- Mirko Jurkovic, All-American football player
- Mary Matalin, Well Known Political Commentator and former campaign aide to Senator Fred Thompson and President George H. W. Bush. Class of 1971.
- Gene Ollrich, former NBA player for the Waterloo Hawks
- Mike Tomczak, Former NFL Quarterback for the Chicago Bears, Green Bay Packers, Cleveland Browns, Detroit Lions, and Pittsburgh Steelers. He is a Super Bowl winning quarterback for the 1985 Chicago Bears season and currently a sportscaster in Pittsburgh, Pennsylvania. Coached at TFN by Ron Tomczak and partner Jerry Munda. Class of 1981.
- Tim Walberg, Republican Representative of Michigan's 7th congressional district since 2011.
- Steve Wojciechowski, Former pitcher for the Oakland Athletics. Class of 1988.
