= Dave Smith (offensive lineman) =

American football player (born 1964)

No. 60
- Position: Offensive tackle

Personal information
- Born: December 12, 1964 (age 61); Hammond, Indiana, U.S.
- Listed height: 6 ft 6 in (1.98 m)
- Listed weight: 290 lb (132 kg)

Career information
- High school: Thornton Fractional South (Lansing, Illinois)
- College: Southern Illinois
- NFL draft: 1988: undrafted

Career history
- Cincinnati Bengals (1988); Kansas City Chiefs (1989)*; Cleveland Browns (1990)*
- * Offseason or practice squad member only
- Stats at Pro Football Reference

David Allan Smith (born December 12, 1964) is an American former professional football offensive tackle who played for the Cincinnati Bengals of the National Football League (NFL). He played college football for the Southern Illinois Salukis.

== Early life ==
David Allan Smith was born on December 12, 1964, in Hammond, Indiana. He attended Thornton Fractional South High School in Lansing, Illinois.

== College career ==
Smith enrolled at Southern Illinois University to play college football for the Salukis. He was a four-year letterman and four-year starter from 1984 to 1987.

== Professional career ==
After going undrafted in the 1988 NFL draft, Smith signed with the Cincinnati Bengals on April 28. The Southern Illinoisan stated that Smith was the first rookie free agent to make the Bengals' opening day roster since 1980. He played in 14 games for Bengals in 1988 as a reserve offensive tackle. Smith also played in three playoff games, including Super Bowl XXIII.

Smith became a free agent after the 1988 season, and signed with the Kansas City Chiefs on March 27, 1989. He was released on September 5, 1989, before the start of the 1989 regular season.

Smith was signed by the Cleveland Browns on March 20, 1990. He was released on September 3, 1990, before the regular season.
