= Ken Kremer =

American football player (born 1957)

No. 91
- Position: Defensive tackle

Personal information
- Born: July 16, 1957 (age 69); Hammond, Indiana, U.S.
- Listed height: 6 ft 4 in (1.93 m)
- Listed weight: 250 lb (113 kg)

Career information
- High school: Thornton Fractional South (Lansing, Illinois)
- College: Ball State
- NFL draft: 1979: 7th round, 167th overall pick

Career history
- Kansas City Chiefs (1979–1984)

Awards and highlights
- Third-team All-American (1978); MAC Defensive Player of the Year (1978)

Career NFL statistics
- Sacks: 21.5
- Fumble recoveries: 4
- Interceptions: 1
- Stats at Pro Football Reference

Kendall James Kremer (born July 16, 1957) is an American former professional football player who was a defensive tackle for the Kansas City Chiefs of the National Football League (NFL). He played college football for the Ball State Cardinals. He was selected by the Chiefs in the seventh round of the 1979 NFL draft and played his entire career for them until 1984.

After his NFL career, Kremer became a sports agent.
