= Lansing Airport =

Lansing Airport can refer to:

- Capital Region International Airport in Lansing, Michigan (FAA/IATA: LAN)
- Lansing Municipal Airport in Lansing, Illinois (FAA: IGQ)
