= Bruce Kingma =

American economist (born 1961)

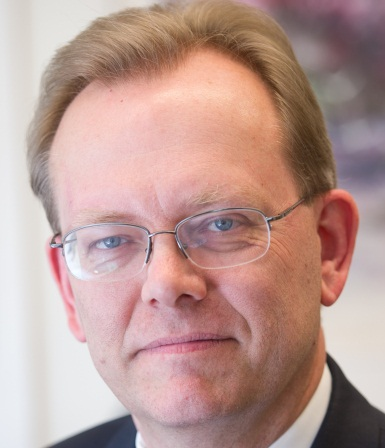
- Bruce Kingma
- Born: October 4, 1961 (age 65); Chicago, IL

Academic background
- Education: University of Chicago; University of Rochester

Academic work
- Discipline: Academic entrepreneurship Information economics Entrepreneurial economics
- Institutions: Syracuse University
- Awards: Deshpande Foundation Award for Excellence in Curriculum Innovation in Entrepreneurship (2015); Leavey Award for Excellence in Private Enterprise Education (2011); American Distance Education Consortium National Award for Excellence in Distance Education (2008); Sloan Consortium Award for Excellence in Online Teaching and Learning, Effective Practice Award (2006)

Bruce Kingma (born October 4, 1961) is an American economist and academic entrepreneur, who since 1988 has taught and worked in the United States, Canada, and New Zealand. Kingma is a pioneer in experiential entrepreneurship education and community engagement and his work cover topics ranging from academic entrepreneurship, entrepreneurship and religion, information economics, online education, community engagement, library science, and nonprofit management.

He is currently working as a Professor of Entrepreneurship at Syracuse University, with joint appointments in the Martin J. Whitman School of Management and School of Information Studies. He is the former Associate Provost for Entrepreneurship and Innovation (2007–2013) and the former Associate Dean of the iSchool (2000–2007), Syracuse University.

== Early life and education ==
Kingma attended Thornton Fractional South High School in Lansing, Illinois. In 1983, Kingma graduated from the University of Chicago with a Bachelors of Arts degree in Economics with honors. Kingma then moved to Rochester to pursue a PhD in economics from the University of Rochester and graduated in 1989.

== Career ==
=== Academic ===
Bruce Kingma is currently working as a professor at Syracuse University in the iSchool and School of Management.

Kingma started his career as an Assistant Professor at the Texas A&M University in the Department of Economics. He then moved to Albany to work as Associate Professor for the School of Information Science and Policy at the University of Albany. While at the University of Albany, he also worked as an Interim Director of Interdisciplinary Ph.D. Program in Information Science (1996–1997) and as a Director of Interdisciplinary Undergraduate Program in Information Science (1997–2000). As the inaugural director of the bachelor's program in information science, Kingma increased course enrollments from 20 to 1600 students within a period of 3 years.

Bruce Kingma joined Syracuse University in the year 2000, as the Associate Dean of the School of Information Studies. He also founded the WISE education consortium - a partnership of 15 universities worldwide committed to quality online education.

Under his leadership, initiatives such as the Web-based Information Science Education (WISE) Consortium became a model for international online course sharing, established quality standards for online education, and created the WISE Awards for Excellence in Online Education.

In 2007, Kingma served as the Provost for Entrepreneurship, Innovation, and Community Engagement at Syracuse University, a title which he held for 6 years. During this time, Kingma transformed entrepreneurship education at Syracuse University.

Major programs started under Provost Kingma's leadership raised over $350m in external funding. These include The Raymond von Dran Innovation and Disruptive Entrepreneurship Accelerator, RvD Student Sandbox Incubator, IDS Lean-Startup courses, Institute for Veterans and Military Families, The Near West Side Initiative, The Center for Digital Media Entrepreneurship, The Entrepreneurship Bootcamp for Veterans with Disabilities, StartUp New York, Engagement Scholars and Kauffman Entrepreneurship Engagement Fellows, The Connective Corridor, The Janklow Arts Leadership Program, The South Side Innovation Center, The South Side Initiative, The New York State Business Plan Competition. Women Igniting the Spirit of Entrepreneurship, The Syracuse University Entrepreneurship Club, and The Creativity, Innovation, and Entrepreneurship Learning Community.

From 2010 to 2013, Kingma was a contributor to the Institute of Museum and Library Services-funded Lib-Value project measuring the return on investment of academic libraries.

=== Entrepreneurial ===
Bruce Kingma originated the Syracuse Model of Entrepreneurship Education, one of the first universities to focus on helping students start ventures.

Bruce Kingma is the founder of the award-winning WISE Consortium in 2002 which was the first international consortium of universities in online education.

=== Research ===
From 2007 to 2013, Kingma produced the “Syracuse Campus-Community Entrepreneurship Initiative: Transforming Campus and Community Culture to Foster Entrepreneurial Development in the Region.” Principal Investigator, Ewing Marion Kauffman Foundation, Kansas City, MO ($3,000,000). From 2006 to 2009, Kingma produced the “WISE+: Leveraging the Power of the Network to Increase the Diversity of LIS Curriculum” Principal Investigator. (joint proposal with the University of Illinois at Champaign-Urbana and the University of Pittsburgh), Institute for Museum and Library Services, Washington, D.C. ($936,338). From 2004 to 2006, Kingma produced the “WISE: Web-based Information Science Education. An Online Consortial Initiative to Build Multi-Institutional Capacity for Library and Information Science Education.” Principal Investigator (joint proposal with the University of Illinois at Champaign-Urbana), Institute for Museum and Library Services, Washington, D.C. ($713,492).

== Awards and honors ==
Kingma received the Sloan Consortium Award for Excellence in Online Teaching and Learning, Effective Practice Award in 2006. In 2007, Syracuse University received the Center for Entrepreneurial Leadership Award from the Global Consortium of Entrepreneurship Centers. In 2008, Kingma received the American Distance Education Consortium National Award for Excellence in Distance Education. In 2009, Kingma received the Community Entrepreneurial Leadership Award. In 2011, Kingma received the Leavey Award for Excellence in Private Enterprise Education. In 2015, Kingma received the Deshpande Foundation Award for Excellence in Curriculum Innovation in Entrepreneurship Education. In 2018, Syracuse University received the National Model Program Award from the United States Association for Small Business and Entrepreneurship.

== Bibliography ==
=== Books ===
- Business Innovation. Dubuque, Iowa: Kendall Hunt Publishing. (August 2026).
- Academic Entrepreneurship and Community Engagement. Edited. Northampton, Massachusetts: Edward Elgar Publishing Inc. (August 2011).
- Assessing Interlibrary Loan Document Delivery Services. With Mary Jackson, Tom Delany. Washington, D.C.: Association of Research Libraries (2004).
- The Economics of Information: A Guide to Economics and Cost-Benefit Analysis for Information Professionals. Second Edition. Englewood, Colorado: Libraries Unlimited, Inc. (January 2001).
- The Economics of Information in the Networked Environment. edited by Meredith Butler and Bruce Kingma. Washington, D.C.: Association of Research Libraries (1996). Also published as an issue of The Journal of Library Administration. 26:1/2 (1998) and as a monograph by Haworth Press (1999).
- The Economics of Access versus Ownership to Scholarly Information, with Suzanne Irving, Binghamton, New York: Haworth Press, Inc. (1996). Also published as an issue of Journal of Interlibrary Loan, Document Delivery & Information Supply. 6:3 (1996).
- The Economics of Information: A Guide to Economics and Cost-Benefit Analysis for Information Professionals. Englewood, Colorado: Libraries Unlimited, Inc. (1996). Also translated and published in Chinese by Ma Jei Cheng, University of Wuhan (1999).

=== Publications ===
==== Economics ====
- Bruce Kingma(1995) Do Profits Crowd-out Donations? or Vice Versa?: The Impact of Revenue from Sales on Donations at the American Red Cross. Nonprofit Management & Leadership, Vol. 6:1
- Bruce Kingma(1995) Public Radio Stations are Really, Really Not Public Goods. Annals of Public and Cooperative Economics, Vol. 66:1
- Bruce Kingma(1993) Portfolio Theory and Nonprofit Financial Stability Nonprofit and Voluntary Sector Quarterly, Vol. 22:2
- Bruce Kingma (1989) An Accurate Measurement of the Crowd Out Effect, Income Effect and Price Effect for Charitable Contributions. Journal of Political Economy, Vol. 97:5.

==== Library and Information Management ====
- Bruce Kingma, Philip Eppard (1992) Journal Price Escalation and the Market for Information: The Librarian's Solution. College & Research Libraries, Vol. 53:6
- Bruce Kingma (1995) The Opportunity Costs of Faculty Status for Academic Librarians. College & Research Libraries, Vol. 56:3
- Bruce Kingma (1998) The Economics of Access Versus Ownership: The Costs and Benefits of Access to Scholarly Articles Via Interlibrary Loan and Journal Subscriptions. Journal of Library Administration, Vol. 26:1–2.
- Bruce Kingma, Kathleen McClure (2015) Lib-Value: Values, Outcomes, and Return on Investment of Academic Libraries, Phase III: ROI of the Syracuse University Library. College & Research Libraries
- Bruce Kingma (2001) The Economics of Information: A Guide to Economic and Cost-Benefit Analysis for Information Professionals. Second Edition. Englewood, Colorado: Libraries Unlimited, Inc.

==== Online Education ====
- Bruce Kingma, Kathleen Schisa (2010) WISE Economics: ROI of Quality and Consortiums. Journal of Education for Library and Information Science. Vol. 51:1.
- Bruce Kingma (2008) The Economics of Learner Centered Online Education. World Library and Information Congress: 74th IFLA General Conference and Council.
- Stacey Keefe, Bruce Kingma (2006) An Analysis of the Virtual Classroom: Does Size Matter? Do Residencies Make a Difference? Should you Hire that Instructional Designer? Journal of Education for Library and Information Science. Vol. 47:2.

==== Entrepreneurship ====
- Bruce Kingma (2014) Creating a Dynamic Campus-Community Entrepreneurial Ecosystem: Key Characteristics of Success. Advances in Entrepreneurship, Firm Emergence and Growth: Academic Entrepreneurship, Creating an Entrepreneurial Ecosystem.
- Bruce Kingma (2014) University-wide Entrepreneurship Education. Advances in the Study of Entrepreneurship, Innovation, and Economic Growth.
- Bruce Kingma (2014) Religion, Entrepreneurship, Income and Employment. International Journal of Social Sciences and Management. Vol. 1: 1
- Bruce Kingma (2011) Academic Entrepreneurship and Community Engagement. Northampton, Massachusetts: Edward Elgar Publishing Inc.

== Membership and Associations ==
Kingma has been on the Board of Directors (2016–2017) of the United States Association for Small Business and Entrepreneurship. He was also a member of the External Review Panel (2004–2017) of the American Library Association, Committee on Accreditation. He has been an iCorps Program Reviewer (2012–2017) for the National Science Foundation.
