= Gene Ollrich =

American basketball player

Personal information
- Born: June 30, 1922 Whiting, Indiana, U.S.
- Died: June 16, 2008 (aged 85) San Luis Obispo, California, U.S.
- Listed height: 5 ft 11 in (1.80 m)
- Listed weight: 160 lb (73 kg)

Career information
- High school: Thornton Fractional North (Calumet City, Illinois)
- College: Drake (1942–1943, 1946–1949)
- BAA draft: 1949: undrafted
- Position: Guard
- Number: 3

Career history
- 1949: Waterloo Hawks

Career highlights
- First-team all-MVC (1947); Second-team all-MVC (1943)
- Stats at NBA.com
- Stats at Basketball Reference

Eugene William "Moe" Ollrich (June 30, 1922 – June 16, 2008) was an American professional basketball player. After a collegiate career at Drake University, Ollrich played for the NBA's Waterloo Hawks, appearing in 14 games during the 1949–50 season.

== Career statistics ==
Legend
GP	Games played	GS	Games started	MPG	Minutes per game
FG%	Field goal percentage	3P%	3-point field goal percentage	FT%	Free throw percentage
RPG	Rebounds per game	APG	Assists per game	SPG	Steals per game
BPG	Blocks per game	PPG	Points per game	**Bold**	Career high

=== NBA ===
==== Regular season ====
Year	Team	GP	FG%	FT%	APG	PPG
1949–50	Waterloo	14	.236	.714	1.7	3.1
