= Mirko Jurkovic =

American football player (1970–2013)

No. 74
- Position: Offensive guard

Personal information
- Born: May 19, 1970
- Died: January 9, 2013 (aged 42); Mishawaka, Indiana, U.S.
- Listed height: 6 ft 4 in (1.93 m)
- Listed weight: 289 lb (131 kg)

Career information
- High school: Thornton Fractional North (Calumet City, Illinois)
- College: Notre Dame
- NFL draft: 1992: 9th round, 246th overall pick

Career history
- Chicago Bears (1992); Green Bay Packers (1994)*
- * Offseason or practice squad member only

Awards and highlights
- Consensus All-American (1991)

Mirko Jurkovic (May 19, 1970 – January 9, 2013) was an American football offensive guard. He played college football at the University of Notre Dame and was a consensus All-American in 1991. He was selected by the Chicago Bears in the ninth round of the 1992 NFL draft.

== Early life ==
Jurkovic attended Thornton Fractional North High School in Calumet City, Illinois.

== College career ==
Jurkovic played for the Notre Dame Fighting Irish football from 1988 to 1991. He was a consensus All-American in 1991. He was a backup lineman on the 1988 Notre Dame Fighting Irish football national championship team. Jurkovic was named Notre Dame lineman of the year by Moose Krause Chapter of the National Football Hall of Fame as a senior in 1991 and played in the Hula Bowl in 1992.

== Professional career ==
Jurkovic was selected by the Chicago Bears in the ninth round, with the 246th overall pick, of the 1992 NFL draft. He spent the entire 1992 season on injured reserve with a knee injury. He was cut by the Bears on August 30, 1993.

Jurkovic signed with the Green Bay Packers on April 27, 1994. He was released on August 23, 1994.

== Personal life ==
He died of colon cancer on January 9, 2013. He is the brother of NFL player John Jurkovic. His son Mirko Jurkovic, Jr. played on the offensive line at the University of Georgia. Mirko also had two daughters, Claire and Sammie.
