= Bill W. Balthis =

American politician

Bill Wayne Balthis (August 18, 1939 – March 16, 2016) was an American politician and businessman who served as a Republican member of the Illinois House of Representatives from April 1991 to January 1997.

Balthis was born in Richmond, Indiana. He served in the United States Air Force from 1960 to 1964. Balthis and his wife owned the Oakwood Insurance Agency in Lansing, Illinois. Balthis served on the Lansing Park District Board and served as president of the park board. He served as the mayor of Lansing, Illinois and was a Republican. Balthis became the Mayor of Lansing, Illinois in 1985.

In 1991, Governor Jim Edgar appointed incumbent State Representative Robert J. Piel to the position of Illinois Commissioner of Banks and Trust Companies. Balthis was appointed to the subsequent vacancy in the Illinois House of Representatives and took office April 1, 1991. Balthis represented the 79th district, which included all or parts of Thornton, Bloom, Crete, and Washington townships. Balthis decided not to seek reelection to the Illinois House in 1996. As part of that year's Democratic wave, son of former Representative Frank Giglio and Democratic candidate Michael Giglio defeated Lansing Village Trustee and Balthis' hand-picked successor, Marvin Lyzenga.

Balthis and his wife moved to Inverness, Florida. He died at the Hospice of Citrus & The Nature Coast in Inverness, Florida.
