= Stallbohm Barn-Kaske House =

Historic house in Indiana, United States

- U.S. National Register of Historic Places
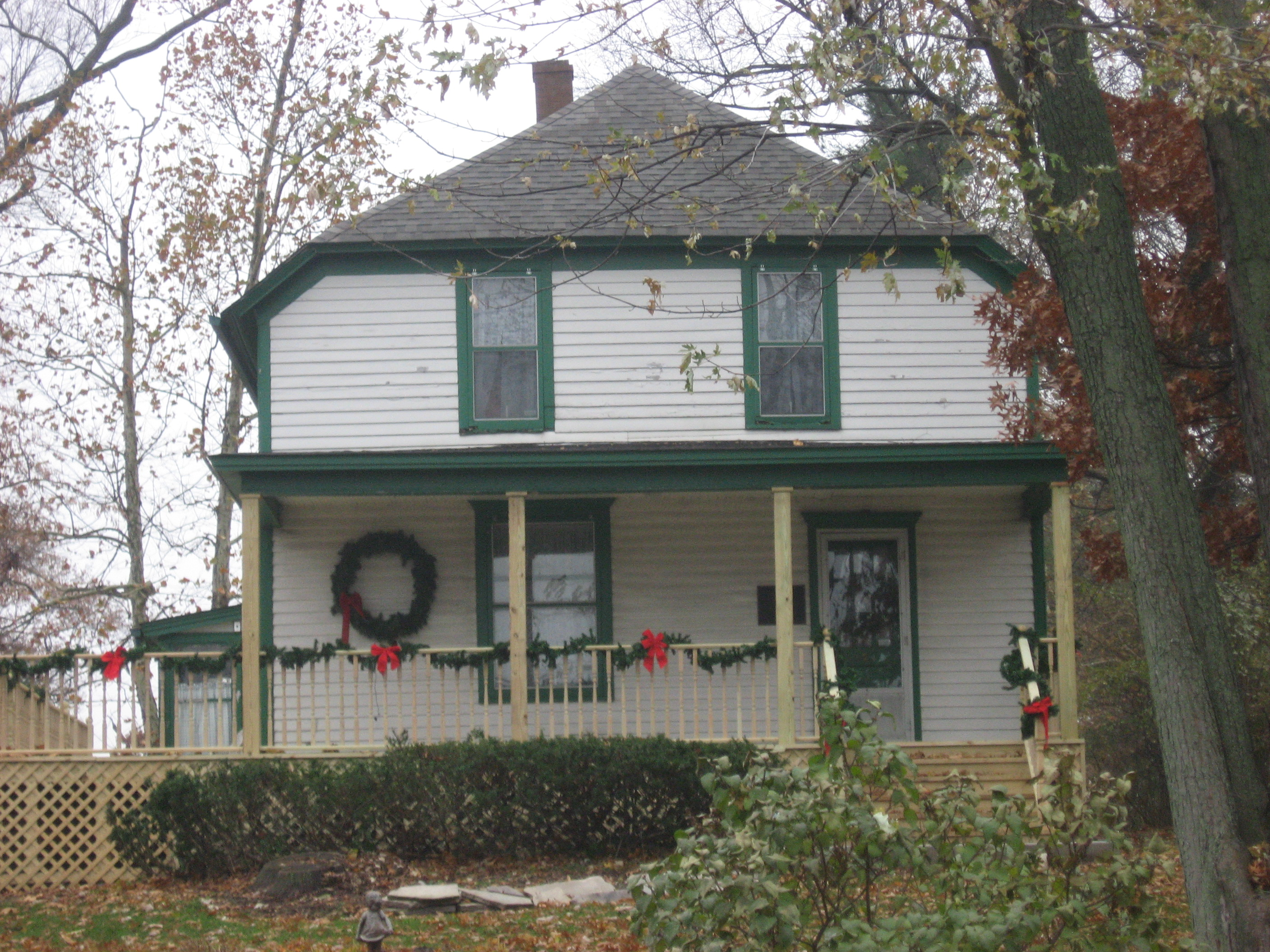
- Kaske House, November 2013

- Location within Indiana Location within the United States
- Location: 1154 Ridge Rd., Munster, Indiana
- Coordinates: 41°33′35″N 87°30′01″W
- Area: 11.4 acres (4.6 ha)
- Built: c. 1890, 1909
- Built by: Kooy Bros.
- Architectural style: Late 19th And Early 20th Century American Movements, English barn
- NRHP reference No.: 98000303
- Added to NRHP: April 1, 1998

Stallbohm Barn-Kaske House, also known as Bieker Woods and Heritage Park, is a historic home and English barn located at Munster, Indiana. The house was built in 1909, and is a two-story, American Foursquare frame dwelling. It has a jerkinhead roof and is sheathed in clapboard siding. The English barn was built about 1890, is a 1 1/2-story wood-frame building with horizontal siding on a brick foundation. The property is now a local public park.

It was listed in the National Register of Historic Places in 1998.
