= John Jurkovic =

German gridiron football player and broadcaster (born 1967)

No. 92, 64, 67
- Position: Defensive tackle

Personal information
- Born: August 18, 1967 (age 59); Friedrichshafen, West Germany
- Listed height: 6 ft 2 in (1.88 m)
- Listed weight: 301 lb (137 kg)

Career information
- High school: Thornton Fractional North (Calumet City, Illinois, U.S.)
- College: Eastern Illinois
- NFL draft: 1990: undrafted

Career history
- Miami Dolphins (1990)*; Green Bay Packers (1991–1995); Jacksonville Jaguars (1996–1998); Cleveland Browns (1999)
- * Offseason or practice squad member only

Awards and highlights
- 2× GCAC Defensive Player of the Year (1988, 1989); 3× First-team All-GCAC (1986, 1988, 1989)

Career NFL statistics
- Tackles: 245
- Sacks: 9.0
- Fumble recoveries: 2
- Stats at Pro Football Reference

Ivan "John" Jurkovic (born August 18, 1967) is a former American football player currently employed as a broadcaster. He grew up in Calumet City, Illinois.

Pre-draft measurables
Height	Weight	Arm length	Hand span	40-yard dash	10-yard split	20-yard split	20-yard shuttle	Vertical jump	Broad jump	Bench press
6 ft 1 3/8 in (1.86 m)	281 lb (127 kg)	30 3/4 in (0.78 m)	9 7/8 in (0.25 m)	5.29 s	1.84 s	2.98 s	4.50 s	28.0 in (0.71 m)	8 ft 4 in (2.54 m)	23 reps
All values from NFL Combine

Jurkovic played professionally as a defensive tackle for the Green Bay Packers, Jacksonville Jaguars, and Cleveland Browns. Jurkovic was a fan favorite in Green Bay for his boisterous personality. He attended Thornton Fractional North High School and Eastern Illinois University.

Jurkovic also was a reserve color commentator for the NFL on FOX from 2001 to 2002, and is now a midday show host on ESPN Radio 1000 in Chicago along with Carmen DeFalco. He was also a color commentator for TNN Arena Football.

His younger brother, Mirko Jurkovic, played football with him at Thornton Fractional North High School and then on the offensive line at the University of Notre Dame where he was an All-American. Mirko died January 9, 2013, from cancer.

He is of Croatian descent.
