= Ibach House =

Historic house in Indiana, United States

- U.S. National Register of Historic Places
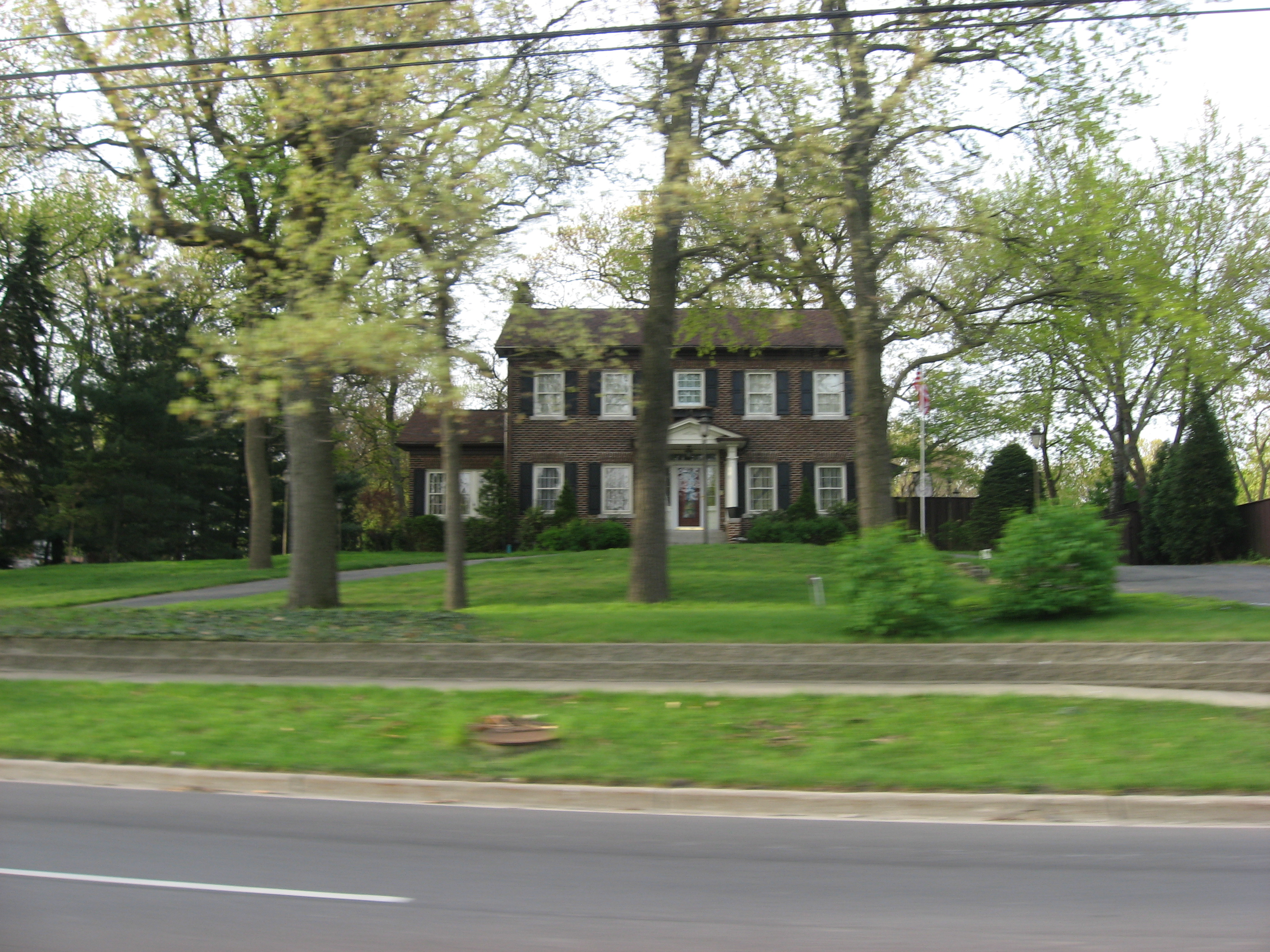
- Ibach House, April 2012

- Location within Indiana Location within the United States
- Location: 1908 Ridge Rd., Munster, Indiana
- Coordinates: 41°33′26″N 87°28′56″W
- Area: Less than 1 acre (0.40 ha)
- Built: 1924
- Architectural style: Colonial Revival
- NRHP reference No.: 10001078
- Added to NRHP: December 27, 2010

Ibach House is a historic home located at Munster, Indiana. It was built in 1924, and is a 2 1/2-story, five-bay, Colonial Revival style brick dwelling with a side-gable roof. It sits on a full basement of concrete block. It features a front portico supported by two Tuscan order columns and an attached sunroom.

It was listed in the National Register of Historic Places in 2010.
