= Powderhorn Lake (Illinois) =

Lake in Illinois

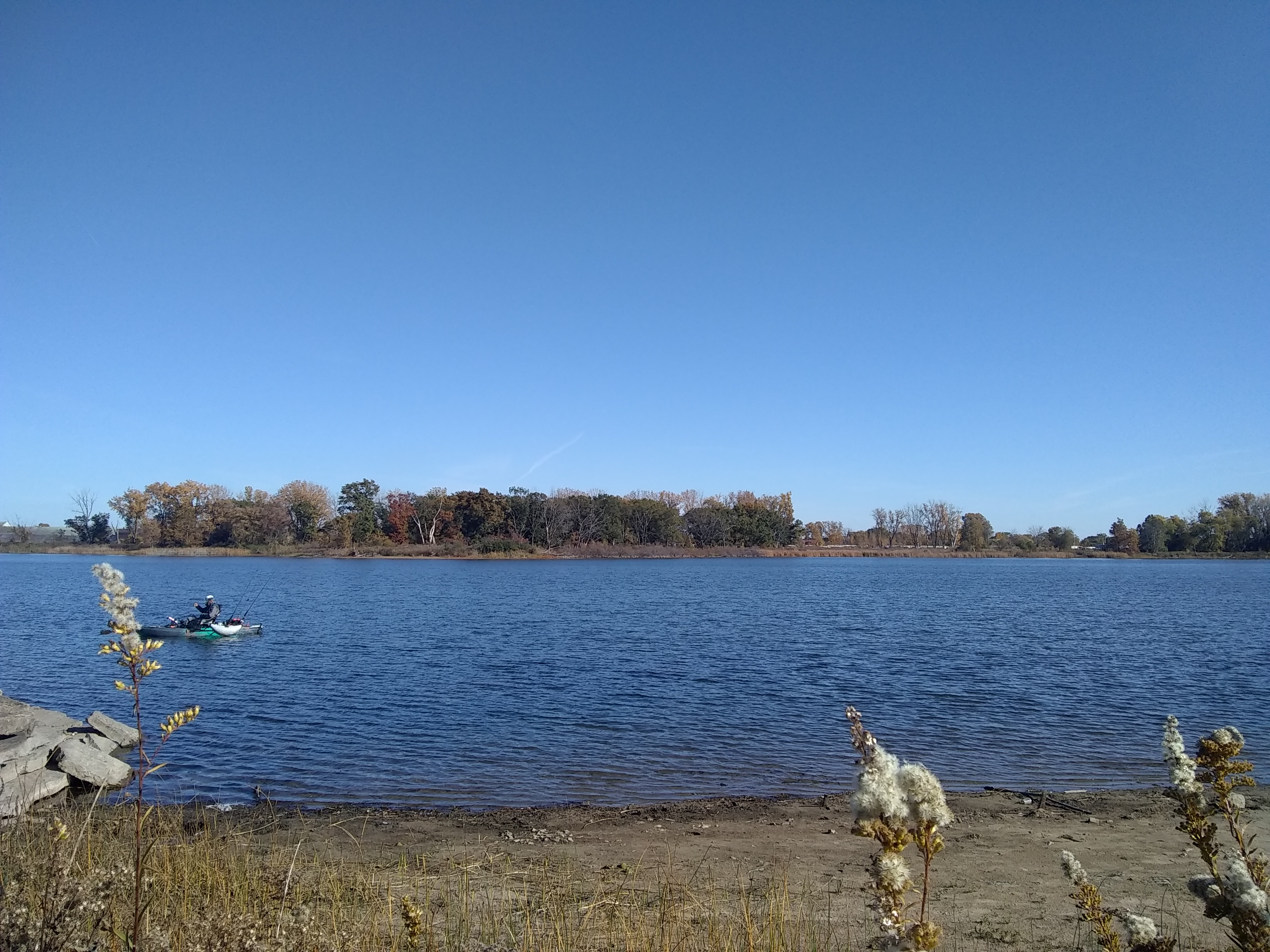
- Powderhorn Lake

- Location within Illinois Location within the United States
- Location: Cook County, Illinois, United States
- Coordinates: 41°38′27″N 87°31′53″W
- Basin countries: United States
- Surface area: 48 acres (19 ha)
- Average depth: 17.4 ft (5.3 m)

Powderhorn Lake, within Illinois but close to the state line, is a 48 acres (19 ha) lake that is part of the sand wetlands of the Indiana Dunes, most of which are located in the nearby state of Indiana. It is the centerpiece of the 192 acres (78 ha) Powderhorn Lake Forest Preserve, part of the Forest Preserve District of Cook County in Cook County, Illinois.

Powderhorn Lake drains into the Grand Calumet River, which is historically part of the Lake Michigan watershed. Man-made engineering now moves the Grand Calumet River's water into the Cal-Sag canal and valley system, which drains into the Des Plaines River and ultimately into the Illinois River.

== Nature ==
In 2007, 130 acres (53 ha) of the Powderhorn Lake forest preserve was designated as the Powderhorn Prairie and Marsh Nature Preserve, the only state of Illinois-designated nature preserve within the city limits of Chicago. The nature preserve protects an overall dune and swale landscape that contains parallel sandy ridges alternating with low-lying woodlands. In the Indiana Dunes ecosystem as a whole, these landscapes foster tallgrass prairies, sedge meadows, savannas, and woodlands.

== Recreation ==
Powderhorn Lake is also managed by the Cook County Forest Preserves for small boating and fishing. Human-powered boating and fishing are encouraged in the southern half of the lake, but are not permitted in the wildlife-refuge northern half. The boat launch is located on the southern border of the lake, off Brainard Avenue in the suburb of Burnham, Illinois.
