= Arline M. Fantin =

American politician

Arline M. Fantin (born September 26, 1937) is a former American politician.

From Calumet City, Illinois, Fantin went to American Floral Art School. She served as the assessor for the Thornton Township, Cook County, Illinois. Fantin served in the Illinois House of Representatives from 1995 to 1999 and was a Democrat.
