= Thornton Fractional South High School =

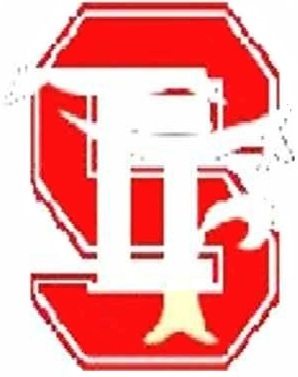

Location
- 18500 Burnham Avenue; Lansing, Illinois 60438; United States; 41.5594°N 87.5417°W

Information
- School type: Public Secondary
- Opened: 1957
- School district: 215 Thornton Fractional Twp. HS 215
- Superintendent: John Robinzine
- CEEB code: 142547
- Principal: Lisa K. Bouler
- Faculty: 165
- Grades: 9–12
- Gender: Coed
- Enrollment: 1,803 (2024-2025)
  - Grade 9: 420 students
  - Grade 10: 428 students
  - Grade 11: 463 students
  - Grade 12: 492 students
- Average class size: 24.2
- Campus type: Suburban
- Colors: Red; Gray
- Athletics conference: South Suburban Conference
- Mascot: “Rocky The Wolf”
- Team name: Red Wolves
- Rival: Thornton Fractional North High School
- Accreditation: North Central Association of Colleges and Schools
- Publication: Rebel Ana
- Newspaper: The HOWLer
- Yearbook: Postscript
- Website: www.tfd215.org/South/

Thornton Fractional Township South High School (TF South, TFS) is a high school located in Suburban Cook County, Illinois, located 6 miles (9.7 km) from the city limits of Chicago. The school serves an area of approximately 9 square miles (23 km^{2}), & serves around 2,000 students in grades 9-12 who reside in the near South Suburban communities of Lansing and Lynwood.

== Foundation ==
Thornton Fractional South High School opened in 1958 and Thornton Fractional High School in Calumet City, which opened in 1926, was renamed to Thornton Fractional North High School. The school flag, a replica of the flag of the Confederacy of the United States, was retired in 1993. The associated Rebel mascot name was later retired in 2020, and replaced with the Red Wolves in 2022. The Thornton Fractional Vocational Center, later renamed the Center for Academics and Technology was later built between the two high schools in Calumet City and opened for T.F. South and T.F. North students and has served many purposes, from being a freshman academy, to hosting AP courses for students from both campuses, to housing programs such as CAD, nursing, and culinary arts.

== Demographics ==
The racial/ethnic makeup of the school as of the 2023-2024 school year was 66.4% Black, 24.5% Hispanic, 6.9% White, 1.2% Multiracial, 0.5% Asian, 0.4% American Indian, 0.1% Pacific Islander.

== Academics ==
In 2010, District 215, T.F. South, T.F. North, and CAT, combined had an average composite ACT score of 18.7. Also in 2010, the total enrollment at T.F. South was 2,014 and graduated 93% of its senior class. T.F. South has not made Adequate Yearly Progress (AYP) on the Prairie State Achievement Examination (PSAE), a state test used in Illinois to fulfill the mandates of the federal No Child Left Behind Act. When comparing District 215's 2008–2009's PSAE scores to 2009–2010's scores, the scores have significantly gone down. Overall, the school has not met minimum expectations in neither mathematics and science. All three of the school's student subgroups failed to meet expectations in mathematics, and two of the three failed to meet expectations in reading.

== Athletics and activities ==
T.F. South competes as a member of the South Suburban Conference. The school is a member of the Illinois High School Association (IHSA), which governs most athletics and competitive activities in Illinois. Teams are known as the Red Wolves. The teams were formerly known as the Rebels before changing their name to the Red Wolves in 2022.

The school sponsors interscholastic teams in Badminton, Baseball, Basketball, Bowling, Cheerleading, Cross Country, Dance, Football, Golf, Soccer, Softball, Swimming, Tennis, Track and Field, Volleyball, and Wrestling.

The following athletic/activity teams have placed top 4 in their respective IHSA sponsored state tournament:

- Badminton (Girls): State Champions (2012–13, 2013–14); 2nd Place (2010–11)
- Bowling (Girls): State Champions (1989–90)
- Drama: State Champion (2002–03); 2nd Place (1991–92, 2000–01, 2008–09); 3rd Place (1960–61, 1971–72, 1986–87)
- Group Interpretation: State Champions (1989–90, 1997–98, 1998–99, 2000–01, 2001–02); 2nd Place (1982–83); 3rd Place (1975–76, 1985–86, 2002–03)
- Speech (Team): State Champions (1960–61); 2nd Place (1962–63)
- eSports (Rocket League): State Champions (2023–24), 4th place (2022–23, 2024–25)
- eSports (Smash Bros. Crew): 4th place (2024–25)

== Notable alumni ==
- Curtis Granderson - Major League Baseball player
- Bruce Kingma - economist, professor, and former provost for entrepreneurship at Syracuse University; graduated from TFS in 1979
- Demetra Plakas - drummer for all-girl punk band L7 (band), graduated in 1982
- Harry Smith - television journalist, best known for CBS's The Early Show and hosting A&E program Biography (1997–2002), currently with NBC
- Pierre Thomas - NFL player, New Orleans Saints
- Tom Baldwin - NFL player, New York Jets
- Ken Kremer - NFL player, Kansas City Chiefs
- Jim O'Heir - actor best known for portraying Jerry Gergich in the television sitcom Parks and Recreation
