= Lansing Municipal Airport =

- IATA: none; ICAO: KIGQ; FAA LID: IGQ

Summary
- Airport type: Public
- Owner: Village of Lansing
- Serves: Chicago, Illinois
- Location: Lansing, Illinois
- Opened: April 1940
- Elevation AMSL: 620 ft (190 m)

Map
- Location of airport in Illinois IGQ (the United States)

Runways
Direction	Length		Surface
Direction	ft	m	Surface
9/27	3,395	1,035	Asphalt
18/36	4,002	1,220	Asphalt

Statistics (2004)
- Aircraft operations: 54,000
- Based aircraft (2016): 143
- Source: Federal Aviation Administration

Lansing Municipal Airport (ICAO: KIGQ, FAA LID: IGQ) is a public airport located 21 miles (34 km) south of Chicago, in Lansing, a village in Cook County, Illinois, United States. It is owned by the Village of Lansing. Before its acquisition by the village, it was known as Chicago-Hammond Airport.

Although most U.S. airports use the same three-letter location identifier for the FAA and IATA, Lansing Municipal Airport is assigned IGQ by the FAA but has no designation from the IATA.

In 2025, the airport hired a consultant to connect the community with aviation, the airport's history, and more. The goal is to broaden the airport's ability to host a variety of events, air shows, and field trips. The airport was named Reliever Airport of the Year by the Illinois Department of Transportation later that year.

The airport is home to a number of flight schools and is a hub for student pilots.

== History ==
- Ford Airport Hangar
- U.S. National Register of Historic Places
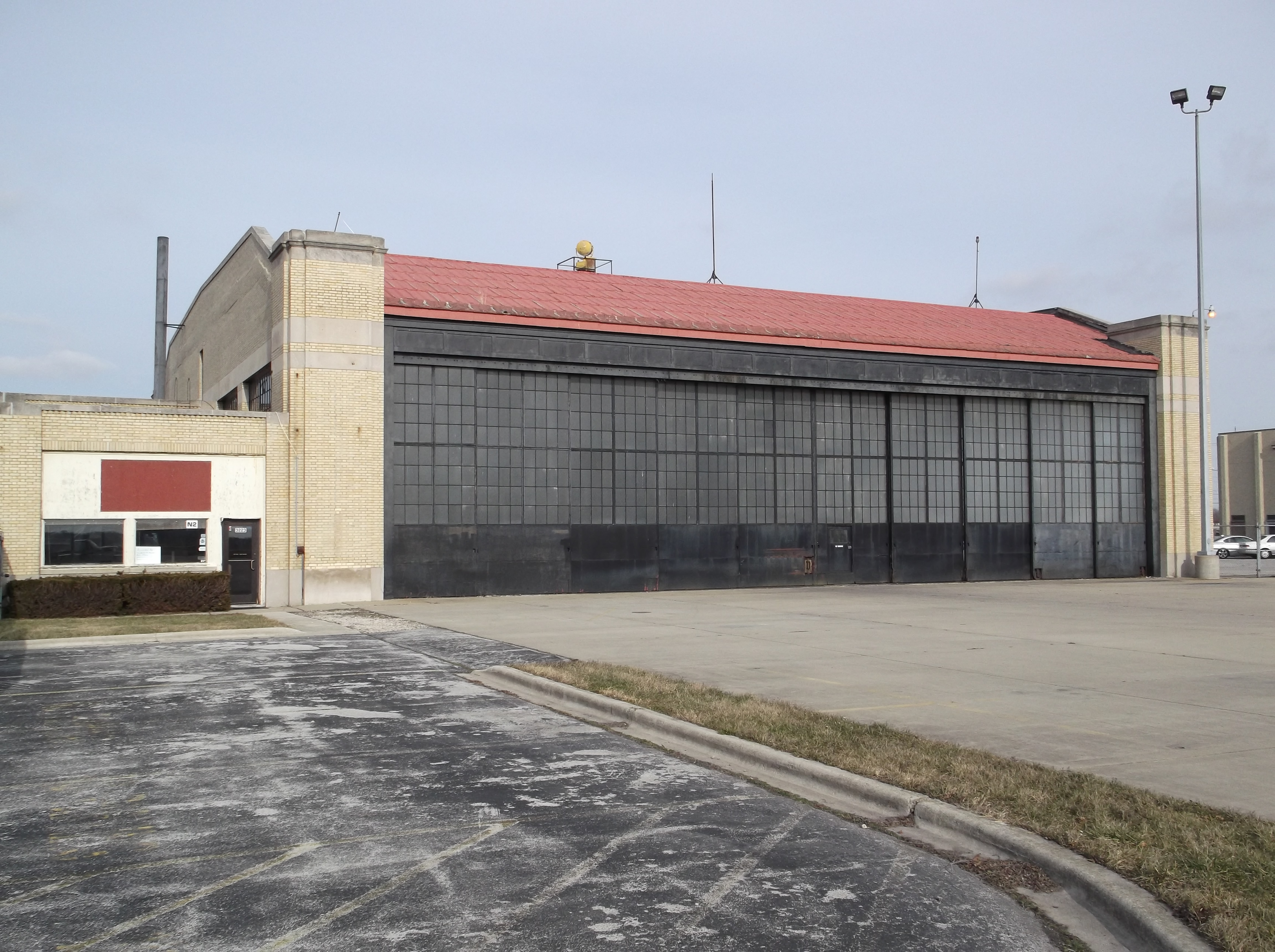
- Ford Hangar in May 2012
- Location: 3250 Bob Malkas Drive Lansing, Illinois
- Coordinates: 41°32′33″N 87°32′18″W
- Built: 1926
- Architect: Albert Kahn
- NRHP reference No.: 85001009
- Added to NRHP: May 9, 1985

The Ford Hangar, located at the Lansing Municipal Airport in Lansing, Illinois, is an airplane hangar built beginning in 1926 and completed by early January 1927. It was established as a historic building on the National Register of Historic Places in 1985. It was built under the direction of Henry Ford to serve as a facility to produce and display Ford Tri-Motor airplanes.

Henry Ford purchased 1400 acres of land in Lansing in 1923 to build an airport to connect southland Chicago with his factories in Detroit. Beginning June 1, 1926, work began on clearing land to build the hangar which was expected, upon completion, to hold three of Ford's Tri-Motor planes.

Architect Albert Kahn oversaw the design and construction of the building. He was Ford's chief architect and wanted to design a space that would solve a number of problems found in early hangars. He incorporated a number of innovations into the building that had not existed in airplane hangars prior to that time. Many hangars were poorly designed, temporary buildings that were not well lit. To solve this, Kahn incorporated three distinct features into the building. He used an architectural technique known as cantilevered construction that allowed the interior of the building to be open without need for columns to support the building, as well as reduce wind pressure on the building. He designed the hangar doors on the north and south side of the building to be easily moved by just one person. Operating on a wheeled track located on the inside of the building, the doors could be opened to any length by one person, regardless of wind or weather conditions. Kahn also looked to improve the overall environment of the building by incorporating as much natural light in the building as possible. As a result, he incorporated five large 15 by 18 foot window openings that, when combined with the open sliding doors, allowed for natural light to reach about 40 percent of the total floor area of the hangar.

Ford's dreams of Tri-Motor construction were hampered by the beginning of the Great Depression. He stopped making airplanes by July 1932, and rented the airport land and the hangar to his former airport manager Elmer L. Browne, and later the Hammond aviator Guy W. Amick. The hangar and the airport were acquired by the Village of Lansing in 1976 in order to qualify for federal funding. The hangar was in its original use until 2011, when it was vacated for preservation purposes. Efforts to rehabilitate the building to its original appearance are currently underway.

== Facilities and aircraft ==
Lansing Municipal Airport covers an area of 650 acres (260 ha) which contains two asphalt paved runways: 9/27 measuring 3,395 x 75 ft (1,035 x 23 m) and 18/36: 4,002 x 75 ft (1,220 x 23 m). It also houses a blimp base which launches 1/4 of the blimps that cover Chicago sporting events.

The airport announced a plan to extend their main runway in August 2023 to allow a wider array of aircraft to operate into and out of the airport.

For the 12-month period ending June 30, 2020 the airport totaled 60,000 aircraft operations, an average of 164 per day: 91% general aviation and 9% air taxi. For the same time period, there were 53 aircraft based at this airport: 44 single engine and 2 multi-engine airplanes, 5 helicopters, 1 glider, and 1 ultralight.

== Accidents and incidents ==
- On July 24, 1966, a Beechcraft Twin Bonanza bound for Lansing Municipal Airport crashed on a nearby golf course. The pilot and all three passengers were killed. On board were professional golfer Tony Lema and his wife.
- On October 14, 2004, a Cessna 172 inbound for Runway 27, at 5:57 a.m., fell short due to bad weather and poor visibility. No one was injured.
- On March 9, 2007, a small plane crashed after takeoff from the airport at 7:30 pm. Two people died. The plane crashed on Calumet Avenue in Munster, Indiana, about 1 mile (1.6 km) away from the airport.
- On September 10, 2012, a gyroplane crashed in a field about 170 yards south of the runway, shortly after takeoff at 11:20 pm. The pilot, who was the only person on board, was pronounced dead at the hospital shortly after the incident.
- On October 5, 2019, a helicopter belonging to SummerSkyz Inc., lost its wheel, which then fell through the roof of a Lynwood, Illinois, resident's home. No one was home when the incident occurred, and no one was injured.

== Ground transportation ==
While no public transit service is provided directly to the airport, Pace provides bus service nearby.

== See also ==
- List of airports in Illinois
