= Calumet City, Illinois =

- City
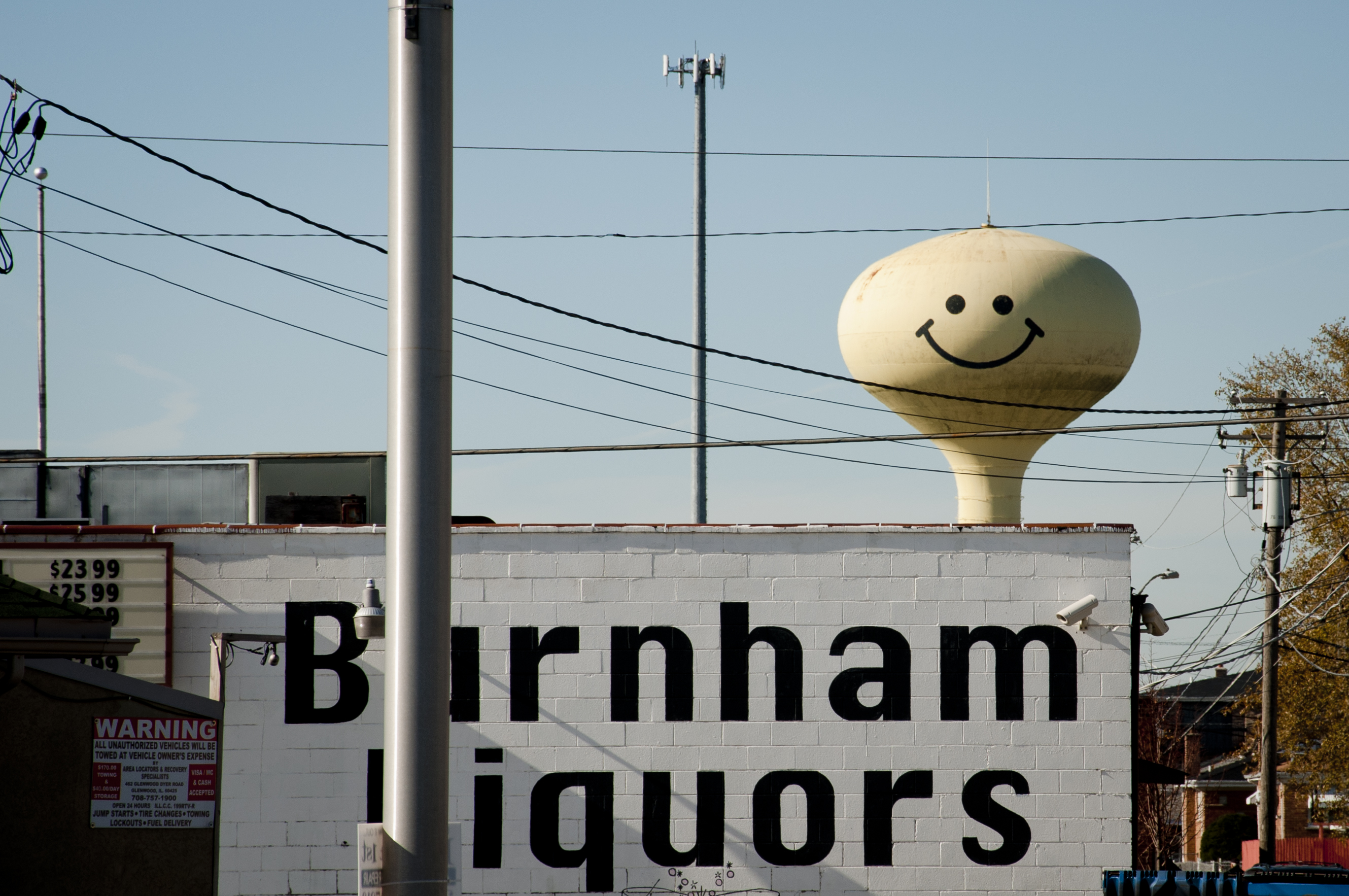
- One of the two smiley face water towers in Calumet City

- Seal
- Interactive map of Calumet City, Illinois
- Location of Calumet City in Greater Chicago Area Location of Calumet City in Illinois Location of Calumet City in the USA
- Coordinates: 41°36′51″N 87°32′47″W
- Country: United States
- State: Illinois
- County: Cook
- Township: Thornton
- Incorporated (Village): February 13, 1893 (as West Hammond)
- Incorporated (City): 1924 (as Calumet City)

Government
  - Type: Council-Mayor
  - Mayor: Thaddeus Jones (D)

Area
  - Total: 7.32 sq mi (18.96 km^{2})
  - Land: 7.20 sq mi (18.64 km^{2})
  - Water: 0.12 sq mi (0.32 km^{2}) 1.64%

Population (2020)
  - Total: 36,033
  - Density: 5,006.1/sq mi (1,932.85/km^{2})

Standard of living (2009-11)
  - Per capita income: $20,390
  - Median home value: $121,900
- ZIP code: 60409
- Area code: 708
- Geocode: 17-10487
- FIPS code: 17-10487
- Website: www.calumetcity.org

Calumet City (/ˌkæljʊˈmɛt/ KAL-yuu-MET) is a city in Cook County, Illinois, United States. The population was 36,033 at the 2020 census. It is a south suburb in the Chicago metropolitan area.

== History ==
Calumet City (commonly referred to locally as "Cal City") was founded in 1893 when the villages of Schrumville and Sobieski Park merged under the name of West Hammond, since it lies on the west side of the Illinois-Indiana line from Hammond, Indiana.

In 1916, when alcohol was prohibited in Indiana, West Hammond became a preferred location for drinkers coming from northwest Indiana. Bootleggers including Al Capone built on this basis once the Prohibition era arrived, and West Hammond gained the nickname of "Sin City".

West Hammond became known for illegal alcohol consumption, gambling, and prostitution. In 1923, residents wishing to rid the city of its reputation voted to change the name from West Hammond to Calumet City.

Frank LaPorte is believed to have been the member of the Chicago Outfit who was most responsible for developing and maintaining the "Sin Strip" area of Calumet City. Police avoided Sin Strip and risked violence if they tried to make an arrest.

In 1959, the state of Illinois conducted a police raid that resulted in 98 arrests and the seizure of business records. An article published in Chicago Daily News on June 2, 1959, exposed LaPorte as being instrumental in the illegal activities in Calumet City.

In 1995, the city began demolishing bars and taverns in the "Sin Strip" area.

== Geography ==
According to the 2021 census gazetteer files, Calumet City has a total area of 7.32 square miles (18.96 km^{2}), of which 7.20 square miles (18.65 km^{2}) (or 98.31%) is land and 0.12 square miles (0.31 km^{2}) (or 1.69%) is water.

=== Surrounding areas ===
In addition to being bordered to the east by Hammond, it is also bordered by Burnham and Chicago to the north, Lansing to the south, and South Holland and Dolton to the west.

Chicago / Burnham
Dolton Hammond
Dolton / South Holland Hammond
South Holland Munster
Lansing

== Demographics ==
Historical population
| Census | Pop. | Note | %± |
|---|---|---|---|
| 1900 | 2,935 | | — |
| 1910 | 4,948 | | 68.6% |
| 1920 | 7,492 | | 51.4% |
| 1930 | 12,298 | | 64.1% |
| 1940 | 13,241 | | 7.7% |
| 1950 | 15,799 | | 19.3% |
| 1960 | 25,000 | | 58.2% |
| 1970 | 32,956 | | 31.8% |
| 1980 | 39,697 | | 20.5% |
| 1990 | 37,840 | | −4.7% |
| 2000 | 39,071 | | 3.3% |
| 2010 | 37,042 | | −5.2% |
| 2020 | 36,033 | | −2.7% |
U.S. Decennial Census; 2010 2020

=== Racial and ethnic composition ===
Calumet City, Illinois – Racial and ethnic composition Note: the US Census treats Hispanic/Latino as an ethnic category. This table excludes Latinos from the racial categories and assigns them to a separate category. Hispanics/Latinos may be of any race.
| Race / Ethnicity (NH = Non-Hispanic) | Pop 1980 | Pop 1990 | Pop 2000 | Pop 2010 | Pop 2020 | % 1980 | % 1990 | % 2000 | % 2010 | % 2020 |
|---|---|---|---|---|---|---|---|---|---|---|
| White alone (NH) | 35,587 | 26,246 | 13,421 | 4,928 | 2,676 | 89.65% | 69.36% | 34.35% | 13.30% | 7.43% |
| Black or African American alone (NH) | 2,321 | 8,920 | 20,530 | 25,888 | 25,959 | 5.85% | 23.57% | 52.55% | 69.89% | 72.04% |
| Native American or Alaska Native alone (NH) | 53 | 40 | 47 | 58 | 51 | 0.13% | 0.11% | 0.12% | 0.16% | 0.14% |
| Asian alone (NH) | 178 | 220 | 205 | 108 | 50 | 0.45% | 0.58% | 0.52% | 0.29% | 0.14% |
| Native Hawaiian or Pacific Islander alone (NH) | 1 | 6 | 16 | 7 | 4 | 0.00% | 0.02% | 0.04% | 0.02% | 0.01% |
| Other race alone (NH) | 36 | 28 | 31 | 31 | 116 | 0.09% | 0.07% | 0.08% | 0.08% | 0.32% |
| Mixed race or Multiracial (NH) | x | x | 579 | 448 | 701 | x | x | 1.48% | 1.21% | 1.95% |
| Hispanic or Latino (any race) | 1,521 | 2,380 | 4,242 | 5,574 | 6,476 | 3.83% | 6.29% | 10.86% | 15.05% | 17.97% |
| Total | 39,697 | 37,840 | 39,071 | 37,042 | 36,033 | 100.00% | 100.00% | 100.00% | 100.00% | 100.00% |

=== 2020 census ===
As of the 2020 census, Calumet City had a population of 36,033 and 14,549 households; there were 8,607 families residing in the city, and the population density was 4,921.20 inhabitants per square mile (1,900.09/km^{2}). There were 16,196 housing units at an average density of 2,211.96 per square mile (854.04/km^{2}).

The median age was 39.1 years. 23.1% of residents were under the age of 18 and 15.4% of residents were 65 years of age or older. For every 100 females there were 83.4 males, and for every 100 females age 18 and over there were 78.4 males age 18 and over.

100.0% of residents lived in urban areas, while 0.0% lived in rural areas.

There were 14,549 households in Calumet City, of which 30.0% had children under the age of 18 living in them. Of all households, 25.7% were married-couple households, 21.2% were households with a male householder and no spouse or partner present, and 47.1% were households with a female householder and no spouse or partner present. About 35.9% of all households were made up of individuals and 14.9% had someone living alone who was 65 years of age or older.

There were 16,196 housing units, of which 10.2% were vacant. The homeowner vacancy rate was 3.7% and the rental vacancy rate was 8.4%.

Racial composition as of the 2020 census
| Race | Number | Percent |
|---|---|---|
| White | 3,510 | 9.7% |
| Black or African American | 26,175 | 72.6% |
| American Indian and Alaska Native | 234 | 0.6% |
| Asian | 67 | 0.2% |
| Native Hawaiian and Other Pacific Islander | 13 | 0.0% |
| Some other race | 3,763 | 10.4% |
| Two or more races | 2,271 | 6.3% |
| Hispanic or Latino (of any race) | 6,476 | 18.0% |

=== Income ===
The median income for a household in the city was $50,640, and the median income for a family was $55,612. Males had a median income of $34,474 versus $32,079 for females. The per capita income for the city was $23,688. About 15.9% of families and 18.4% of the population were below the poverty line, including 29.6% of those under age 18 and 10.9% of those age 65 or over.

== Arts and culture ==
A landmark and point of pride among Cal City residents is the pair of large water towers painted like the popular "Have a Nice Day" smiley faces which are located on Ring Road near River Oaks Mall, the other State Street near Interstate 94.

== Government ==
Calumet City has a Mayor-Council type government.

The city has 7 Wards.

Calumet City is in Illinois's 2nd congressional district.

The mayor of Calumet City is currently Thaddeus Jones. He has served as Mayor since being elected to the office in 2021.

=== Mayors of Calumet City ===
Mayors of Calumet City, Illinois

| Image | Mayor | Years | Notes |
|---|---|---|---|
| | John Hessler | February 13, 1893 – 1895 | Elections were held annually until 1904 when the term was changed to two years. |
| | | – | |
| | Patrick Kennedy | 1900 | |
| | | – | |
| | Peter Mak | ?–1906–? | |
| | Jacob Czaszewicz | 1907–1909 | First Polish mayor |
| | John Hessler (2nd term) | 1909–1911 | |
| | Konstantine M. Wosczynski | April 1911 – April 1915 | Wosczynski did not assume the mayorship until 2012 due to litigation. He won relection in 1913. |
| | Paul M. Kamradt | April 1915 – March 1925 | Defeated incumbent mayor K. M. Wosczynski in March 1915 primary election in West Hammond (name change to Calumet City in 1923); Defeated Martin Finneran in April 1915 general election. Grandfather of mayor Robert Stefaniak |
| | John W. Jaranowski | March 1925 – April 1935 | Defeated Paul M. Kamradt in the general election on March 11, 1925 |
| | William F. Zick | April 1935 – April 1941 | Defeated John Jaranowski in April 1935 general election Lost to Jaranowski in April 1941 general election |
| | John W. Jaranowski (2nd term) | April 1941 – April 1945 | Previously served as mayor from 1925 to 1935 Lost in reelection bid in April 1945 |
| | Frank L. Kaminski | April 1945 – April 1953 | Defeated John W. Jaranowski in April 1945 |
| | Stanley E. Bejger | April 1953 – April 1961 | Son-in-law of former mayor John Jaranowski; Choose to not run for reelection in 1961 |
| | Joseph W. Nowak | April 1961 – January 28, 1972 | First elected in April 1961. Resigned on January 28, 1972 after being sentenced to three years in prison for embezzlement |
| | Herbert Breclaw | January 31, 1972 – June 6, 1972 | Named interim mayor on January 31, 1972 until a special election on June 6, 1972 |
| | Robert Stefaniak | June 6, 1972 – 1993 | First elected in a special election held on June 6, 1972, to complete the remaining 10 months of former mayor Joseph W. Nowak's term. Won in the general election in April 1973; Choose to not run for reelection in 1993. |
| | Jerome "Jerry" Genova | 1993 – October 2001 | Resigned in October 2001 after being indicted |
| | Dominick Gigliotti | October 2001 – April 2003 | Appointed to fill out the remainder of the term of Jerry Genova until a special election was held in April 2003 |
| | Greg Skubisz | April 2003 – September 2003 | Elected by 24 votes over Michelle Markiewicz Qualkinbush in a special election held in April 2003. Sworn into office. Overturned on appeal on September 2, 2003, by Circuit Court Judge Michael Murphy who threw out 38 absentee ballots that he determined to have been illegally cast for Skubisz and eliminated about 50 other contested ballots resulting in Markiewicz Qualkinbush winning the election by 27 votes. |
| | Michelle Markiewicz Qualkinbush | 2003–2021 | Reelected in the general election in 2009 |
| | Thaddeus Jones | 2021–Present | First African American mayor |

== Education ==
Calumet City is served by several elementary school districts:

- Calumet City School District 155
  - Woodrow Wilson Memorial School
  - Wentworth Intermediate School
  - Wentworth Jr. High School
- Dolton School District 149
  - Berger Vandenberg School
  - Carol Moseley Braun School
  - Caroline Sibley School
  - Dirksen Middle School
- Lincoln Elementary School District 156
  - Lincoln Elementary School
- Hoover-Schrum Memorial School District No. 157
  - Hoover Elementary School
  - Schrum Memorial Middle School

The city is served by two high school districts:

- Thornton Township High School District 205 (west of Torrence Avenue)
  - Thornwood High School
- Thornton Fractional High School District 215 (east of Torrence Avenue)
  - Thornton Fractional North High School

== Transportation ==
Pace provides bus service on multiple routes connecting Calumet City to destinations across the Southland.

== Notable people ==
- Randy Barnett (b. 1952), American legal scholar
- Calboy, American rapper who rose to fame in 2018.
- Joseph F. Fanta (1914–1988), member of the Illinois House of Representatives from 1957 to 1963 and 1965–1967. He was a childhood resident of Calumet City.
- Arline M. Fantin (b. 1937), Illinois state representative. She resided in Calumet City while a representative.
- Frank Giglio (b. 1933), Illinois state representative. He resided in Calumet City while a representative.
- John Jurkovic (b. 1967), defensive lineman for several NFL teams; radio host at ESPN Radio 1000
- Mirko Jurkovic (1970–2013), former offensive guard for the Chicago Bears and All-American at the University of Notre Dame
- Alan Keyes (b. 1950), conservative political activist and perennial candidate. Keyes moved from Maryland to Calumet City to establish residency after being drafted by the Illinois Republican Party to run against Barack Obama in the 2004 United States Senate election.
- Gene Krupa (1909–1973), jazz drummer, buried in Holy Cross Cemetery
- José Olivarez, poet, author of Citizen Illegal and Promises of Gold. Editor of The Breakbeat Poets Volume 4: LatiNext.
- DJ Rashad (1979–2014), Chicago house music producer
- Tink (b. 1995), singer-songwriter
- Mike Tomczak (b. 1962), quarterback for several NFL teams, including the 1985 Chicago Bears Super Bowl champions
- Steve Wojciechowski (b. 1970), former pitcher for the Oakland Athletics
- Tim Walberg (b. 1951), member of the United States House of Representatives from Michigan. His family moved from Chicago to Calumet City and he attended Thornton Fractional Township North High School.

== In popular culture ==
Calumet City is featured or mentioned in a number of major movies. John Belushi's "Joliet Jake" and Dan Aykroyd's "Elwood" characters from The Blues Brothers were born in Calumet City, and so is the orphanage they grew up in, which they save "on a mission from God" by paying $5,000 in property taxes from a $10,000 record deal at their concert, as well as "Ray's Music Exchange" that holds the famed Ray Charles "Shake Your Tail-Feather" scene of the movie. In the book and film The Silence of the Lambs, Buffalo Bill is thought to be hiding in Calumet City, when he is actually in Belvedere, Ohio. The Calumet City scenes in the film were filmed in Pittsburgh, Pennsylvania, however. Lily Tomlin's prim but assertive housewife/spokesperson "Mrs. Judith Beasley" is said to be a resident of Calumet City. She said, "Hi. I am not an actress, but a real person like yourself."

Calumet City is also referenced by a number of popular music acts. The Black Crowes included a video of the Smiley Towers in their 1990 video for "Hard to Handle". A photograph of the "Dolton" smiley water tower is featured on the back of the Dead Kennedys album Plastic Surgery Disasters. Rapper Twista has referenced Calumet City. Kanye West's reference to Calumet in his 2005 song "Drive Slow" does not refer to Calumet City, but rather to Calumet High School, which was located in the South Side of Chicago and not in Calumet City.

The Smiley Tower is also featured in the movie Natural Born Killers; it is seen out the window of Mallory's family home (part of that movie was filmed in Hammond, Indiana). In the Nine Inch Nails music video on the director's cut of the same film, the Smiley Tower and Dolton Avenue/State Street is featured.

The founders of the Calumet Baking Powder Company adopted its brand name from the original Native American word for the land that became Calumet City. They later named one of thoroughbred horse racing's most famed and successful enterprises, Calumet Farm, after the company.

In 2004, Alan Keyes purchased a raised ranch house in Calumet City to establish residency in Illinois so he could run for the U.S. Senate in place of Jack Ryan against Barack Obama, although instead of residing in the house, he officially moved into an apartment elsewhere in town, on Garfield Avenue.

In 2010, pop music group Hanson remade the "Shake Your Tailfeather" scene from The Blues Brothers for the music video for their hit "Thinkin' 'Bout Somethin'" in Tulsa, Oklahoma, paying homage to Calumet City's Ray's Music Exchange, John Belushi, and Ray Charles.

Jean Shepherd (writer and narrator of the classic movie A Christmas Story) in radio broadcasts from WOR radio, New York in the 1950s, 1960s and 1970s and in his PBS specials of the 1970s and 1980s, and his many books, often refers to it as Cal City or just Calumet. He grew up in nearby Hammond, Indiana.

== See also ==
- List of U.S. communities with African-American majority populations in 2020
