= Burnham, Illinois =

- Village
- Seal

- Location of Burnham in Cook County, Illinois.

- Location within Greater Chicago Location within Illinois Location within the United States
- Coordinates: 41°38′8″N 87°33′5″W
- Country: United States
- State: Illinois
- County: Cook
- Township: Thornton
- Incorporated: 1907

Government
  - Type: Council–manager
  - President: Robert E. Polk

Area
  - Total: 1.94 sq mi (5.02 km^{2})
  - Land: 1.85 sq mi (4.80 km^{2})
  - Water: 0.085 sq mi (0.22 km^{2}) 4.62%

Population (2020)
  - Total: 4,046
  - Density: 2,181.3/sq mi (842.19/km^{2})

Standard of living (2007–2011)
  - Per capita income: $18,234
  - Median home value: $143,200
- ZIP code(s): 60633
- Area code(s): 708
- Geocode: 17-09798
- FIPS code: 17-09798
- Website: https://burnham-il.gov

Burnham is a village in Cook County, Illinois, United States. The population was 4,046 at the 2020 census. Burnham has a Chicago ZIP code (60633) and was named for Telford Burnham, who drew its plat.

There are two sections of Burnham. The westernmost section surrounds Torrence Avenue, a north–south street. Torrence Avenue leaves this part of Burnham via a bridge, with Chicago on the other side. The eastern section surrounds Burnham Avenue, another north–south street. This section of Burnham ends at Brainard Avenue, where the Hegewisch neighborhood of Chicago lies on the other side. Upon entering Chicago, Burnham Avenue becomes Avenue O.

== History ==
Due to its close proximity to Chicago, Burnham is frequently the subject of annexation debates for the city. One of the arguments is that Burnham is simply too small to govern itself efficiently without a high municipal tax burden, and that it would be cheaper for Burnham residents to be annexed into Chicago.

== Geography ==
Burnham is located at 41°38′8″N 87°33′5″W (41.635535, -87.551284).

According to the 2021 census gazetteer files, Burnham has a total area of 1.94 square miles (5.02 km^{2}), of which 1.86 square miles (4.82 km^{2}) (or 95.62%) is land and 0.09 square miles (0.23 km^{2}) (or 4.38%) is water. The water section of Burnham includes part of Powderhorn Lake and its adjacent nature preserve, a unit of the Cook County Forest Preserve District.

=== Surrounding areas ===
Burnham is bordered by Chicago to the north, Calumet City to the south and west, and Hammond, Indiana, to the east.

Chicago
Chicago Hammond, Indiana
Calumet City Hammond, Indiana
Calumet City Hammond, Indiana
Calumet City

== Demographics ==
Historical population
Census	Pop.	Note	%±
1910	328		—
1920	795		142.4%
1930	994		25.0%
1940	865		−13.0%
1950	1,331		53.9%
1960	2,478		86.2%
1970	3,634		46.7%
1980	4,030		10.9%
1990	3,916		−2.8%
2000	4,170		6.5%
2010	4,206		0.9%
2020	4,046		−3.8%
U.S. Decennial Census; 2010 2020

=== Racial and ethnic composition ===
Burnham village, Illinois – Racial and ethnic composition Note: the US Census treats Hispanic/Latino as an ethnic category. This table excludes Latinos from the racial categories and assigns them to a separate category. Hispanics/Latinos may be of any race.
Race / Ethnicity (NH = Non-Hispanic)	Pop 2000	Pop 2010	Pop 2020	% 2000	% 2010	% 2020
White alone (NH)	1,172	729	491	28.11%	17.33%	12.14%
Black or African American alone (NH)	2,248	2,587	2,419	53.91%	61.51%	59.79%
Native American or Alaska Native alone (NH)	6	15	2	0.14%	0.36%	0.05%
Asian alone (NH)	42	21	12	1.01%	0.50%	0.30%
Pacific Islander alone (NH)	1	0	0	0.02%	0.00%	0.00%
Other race alone (NH)	4	10	15	0.10%	0.24%	0.37%
Mixed race or Multiracial (NH)	62	39	72	1.49%	0.93%	1.78%
Hispanic or Latino (any race)	635	805	1,035	15.23%	19.14%	25.58%
Total	4,170	4,206	4,046	100.00%	100.00%	100.00%

=== 2020 census ===
As of the 2020 census, Burnham had a population of 4,046, with 1,475 households and 821 families.

The median age was 41.4 years. 21.5% of residents were under the age of 18 and 14.8% were 65 years of age or older. For every 100 females, there were 93.5 males, and for every 100 females age 18 and over, there were 91.0 males age 18 and over.

There were 1,589 housing units, with 7.2% vacant. The homeowner vacancy rate was 2.6% and the rental vacancy rate was 7.0%. The population density was 2,085.57 inhabitants per square mile (805.24/km^{2}), and housing density was 819.07 per square mile (316.24/km^{2}).

100.0% of residents lived in urban areas, while 0.0% lived in rural areas.

Of households in Burnham, 32.6% had children under the age of 18 living in them. Of all households, 30.3% were married-couple households, 22.4% were households with a male householder and no spouse or partner present, and 41.2% were households with a female householder and no spouse or partner present. About 30.9% of all households were made up of individuals, and 9.5% had someone living alone who was 65 years of age or older. The average household size was 3.56 and the average family size was 2.40.

=== Income and poverty ===
The median income for a household in the village was $46,382, and the median income for a family was $46,890. Males had a median income of $54,931 versus $27,141 for females. The per capita income for the village was $24,430. About 15.3% of families and 15.4% of the population were below the poverty line, including 16.8% of those under age 18 and 15.3% of those age 65 or over.

== Transportation ==
Pace provides bus service on multiple routes connecting Burnham to destinations across the Southland.

== Notable people ==
- Mary Matalin, political consultant and author
