= Munster, Indiana =

- Town
- Town of Munster, Indiana

- Logo

- Location of Munster in Lake County, Indiana.
- Coordinates: 41°32′45″N 87°30′05″W
- Country: United States
- State: Indiana
- County: Lake
- Township: North
- Settled: 1850s
- Incorporated: 1907
- Named for: Jacob Munster

Government
  - Type: Town
  - Body: Town Council
  - Members: George Shinkan (R, 1st) Joe Hofferth (R, 2nd) Chuck Gardiner (R, 3rd) David Nellans (R, 4th) Jonathan Petersen (R, 5th)
  - Clerk-Treasurer: Wendy Mis (R)

Area
  - Total: 7.63 sq mi (19.75 km^{2})
  - Land: 7.53 sq mi (19.51 km^{2})
  - Water: 0.093 sq mi (0.24 km^{2})
- Elevation: 614 ft (187 m)

Population (2020)
  - Total: 25,894
  - Density: 3,172.3/sq mi (1,224.83/km^{2})

Standard of living (2008–12)
  - Per capita income: $34,735
  - Median home value: $197,600
- Time zone: UTC−6 (Central)
  - Summer (DST): UTC−5 (Central)
- ZIP code: 46321
- Area code: 219
- FIPS code: 18-51912
- GNIS feature ID: 2396794
- Website: www.munster.org

Munster is a suburban town in North Township, Lake County, Indiana, United States. It is in the Chicago metropolitan area, approximately 30 miles (48 km) southeast of the Chicago Loop, and shares municipal boundaries with Hammond to the north, Highland to the east, Dyer and Schererville to the south, and Lansing directly west over the Illinois border. Its population was 23,894 at the 2020 US Census.

== Geography ==
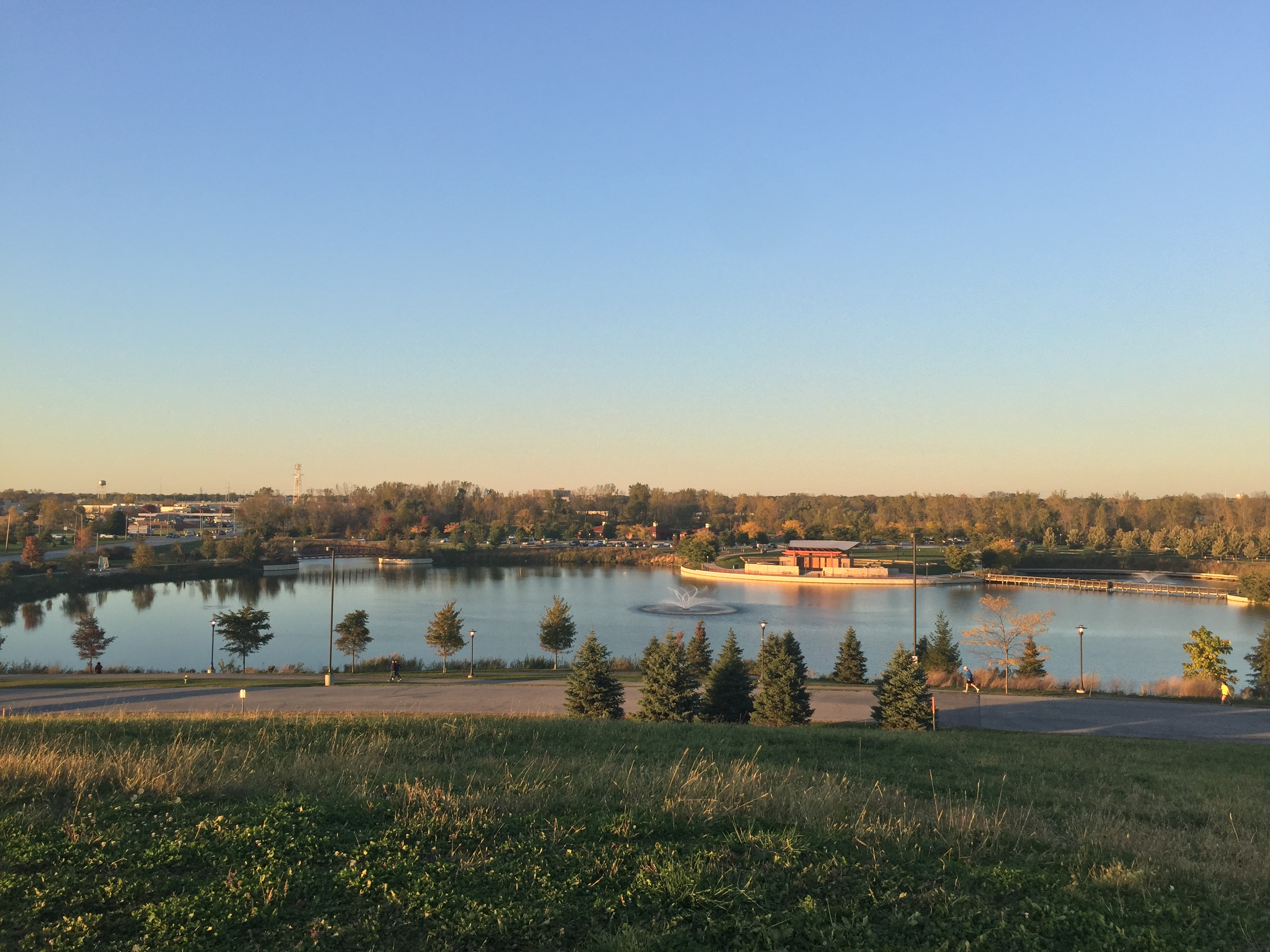
View of the Centennial Park lake and amphitheater, opened in 2007.

Munster is located at a point on an ancient shoreline of Lake Michigan (known as the Calumet Shoreline) which is today known as Ridge Road. This ridge runs east and west through the north part of town, hence the town's nickname "Town on the Ridge".

The town's boundaries contain three small lakes, one of which, located within Centennial Park, is marshy and undeveloped. Munster is bordered on the north by the Little Calumet River, a shallow river surrounded by a thin strip of wooded area; and on the West by the Illinois state line.

According to the 2010 census, Munster has a total area of 7.65 square miles (19.81 km^{2}), of which 7.57 square miles (19.61 km^{2}) (or 98.95%) is land and 0.08 square miles (0.21 km^{2}) (or 1.05%) is water.

== History ==
The Ibach House and Stallbohm Barn-Kaske House are listed in the National Register of Historic Places.

=== Early history ===
The earliest known inhabitants of the area were the Potawatomi. Although a village did not exist in what was to become Munster's town boundaries, a trail along the dry sandy ridge now known as Ridge Road was well traveled by the indigenous inhabitants. Today, Munster's downtown area, the Town Hall, Police and Fire Department headquarters, the Center for the Visual and Performing Arts, the site of a former school, and the Munster Post Office are all situated on Ridge Road.

In the late 17th and early 18th centuries, the area that is today Munster was part of land claimed by France as French territory. In the 1760s the British claimed the land where the Potawatomi lived as part of the British Empire. Twenty years later George Rogers Clark overran the British in the American Revolutionary War, claiming the land for the newly independent United States of America.

In the 1850s, as the numbers of Native Americans dwindled, pioneer settlers began to inhabit the area which would become Munster to grow crops and provide dairy products to the profitable markets in Chicago.

When Jacob Munster, a young man from the Netherlands who until the 1860s spelled his surname "Monster," opened an area general store complete with a U.S. postal station on the back, the local farmers and settlers came to rely on the postal station, which soon became a United States Post Office. The post office was named Munster, as it was located in Jacob Munster's general store.

Before long more and more people moved to the "Munster" area, and in 1907 Munster was incorporated as a town, with 76 residents voting "yes" for the incorporation and 28 voting "no."

=== Modern times ===
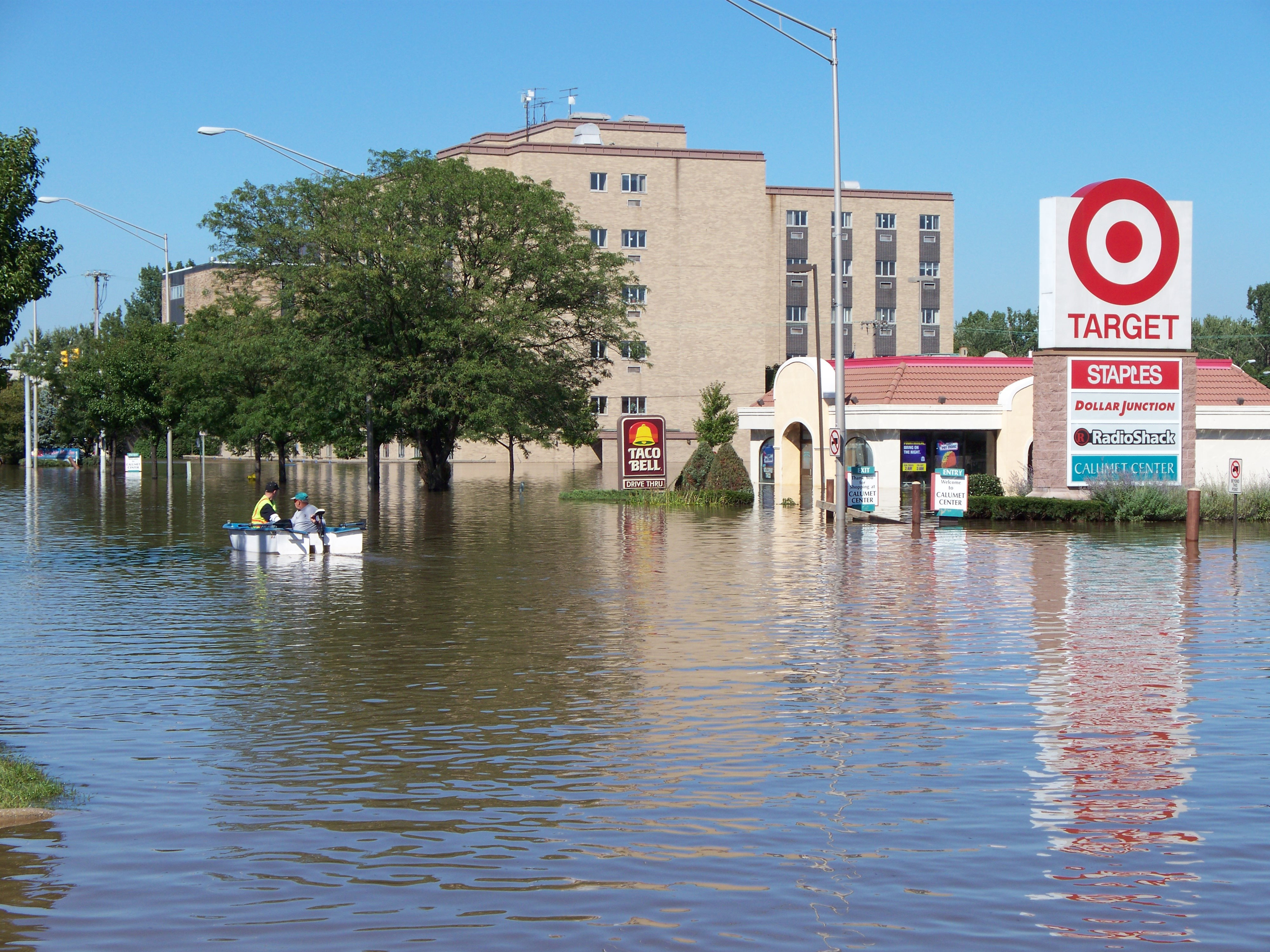
Residents boat down Calumet Avenue following the impact of Hurricane Ike.

Munster soon became a booming town that attracted many people. Munster saw difficult times through the rough years of the Great Depression. During the Cold War, Munster served as the site of the Nike-Zeus Missile defense base C-46. The site was closed in 1971 and is now under private ownership.

In September 2008, Munster's northern portions suffered flooding resulting from the impact of Hurricane Ike, which caused the Little Calumet River to overflow. A main break occurred in the levee located near the intersection of Calumet Avenue and River Drive in the northwest quadrant of the town. Munster has requested the Army Corps of Engineers to elevate the levee in low-lying areas. The levee improvements have been completed and the majority of homes destroyed have been rebuilt, in most cases, with larger, more amenity-filled homes.

The 2010 Comprehensive Plan for Munster's next twenty years includes plans for a new town center with shopping and dining to be organized around a proposed train station.

== Demographics ==
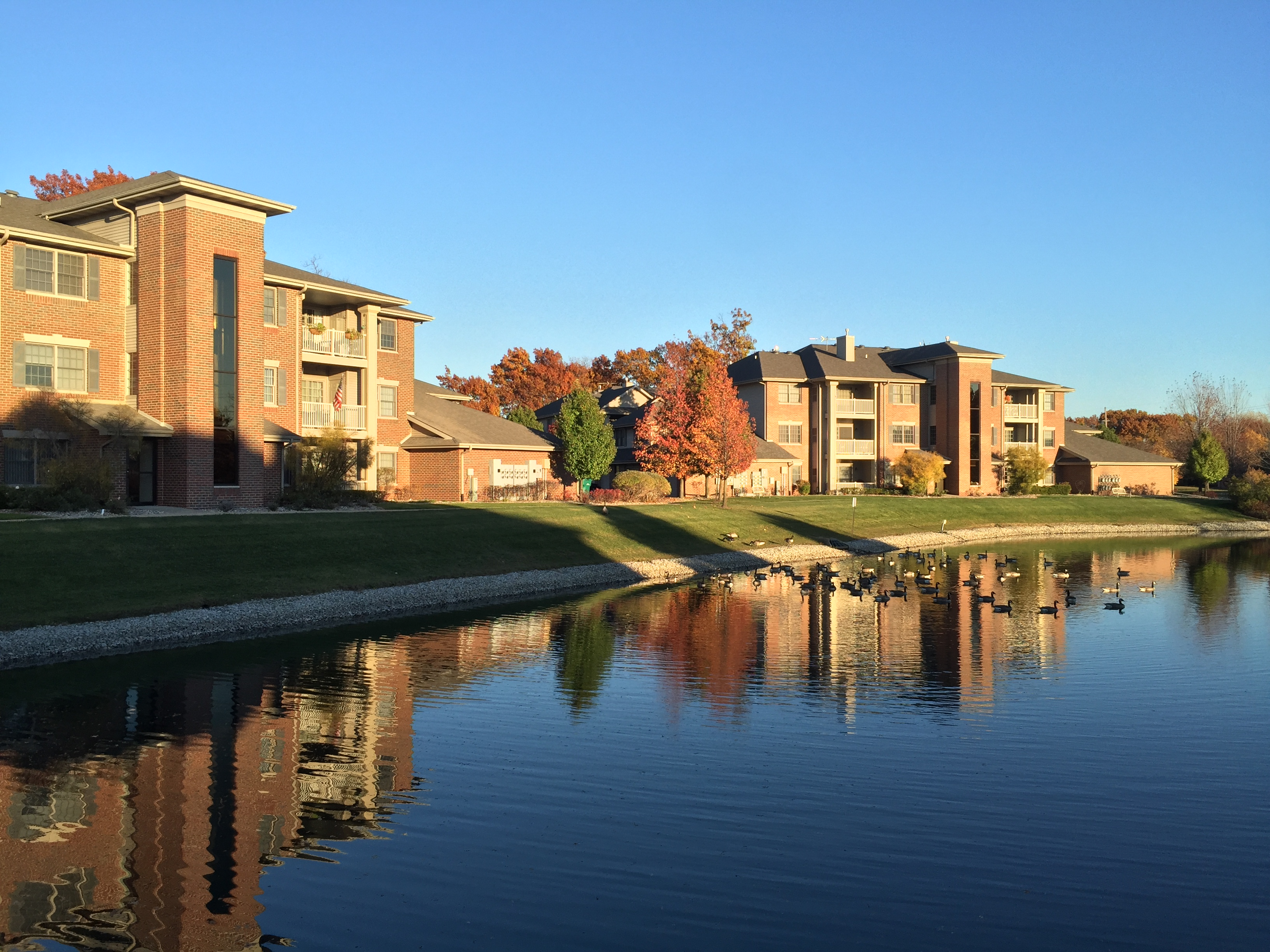
White Oak Woods condominium complex is located right off the Pennsy Greenway trail.

Historical population
Census	Pop.	Note	%±
1910	543		—
1920	605		11.4%
1930	975		61.2%
1940	1,751		79.6%
1950	4,753		171.4%
1960	10,313		117.0%
1970	16,514		60.1%
1980	20,671		25.2%
1990	19,949		−3.5%
2000	21,511		7.8%
2010	23,603		9.7%
2020	23,894		1.2%
Source: US Census Bureau

=== Racial and ethnic composition ===
Munster town, Indiana – Racial and ethnic composition Note: the US Census treats Hispanic/Latino as an ethnic category. This table excludes Latinos from the racial categories and assigns them to a separate category. Hispanics/Latinos may be of any race.
Race / Ethnicity (NH = Non-Hispanic)	Pop 2000	Pop 2010	Pop 2020	% 2000	% 2010	% 2020
White alone (NH)	19,098	18,689	16,343	88.78%	79.18%	68.40%
Black or African American alone (NH)	216	806	1,456	1.00%	3.41%	6.09%
Native American or Alaska Native alone (NH)	11	29	25	0.05%	0.12%	0.10%
Asian alone (NH)	958	1,369	1,517	4.45%	5.80%	6.35%
Native Hawaiian or Pacific Islander alone (NH)	4	2	5	0.02%	0.01%	0.02%
Other race alone (NH)	14	32	56	0.07%	0.14%	0.23%
Mixed race or Multiracial (NH)	160	266	770	0.74%	1.13%	3.22%
Hispanic or Latino (any race)	1,050	2,410	3,722	4.88%	10.21%	15.58%
Total	21,511	23,603	23,894	100.00%	100.00%	100.00%

=== 2020 census ===
As of the 2020 census, Munster had a population of 23,894. The median age was 44.7 years. 22.2% of residents were under the age of 18 and 21.3% of residents were 65 years of age or older. For every 100 females there were 93.8 males, and for every 100 females age 18 and over there were 90.5 males age 18 and over.

100.0% of residents lived in urban areas, while 0.0% lived in rural areas.

There were 9,182 households in Munster, of which 31.3% had children under the age of 18 living in them. Of all households, 56.4% were married-couple households, 14.2% were households with a male householder and no spouse or partner present, and 25.8% were households with a female householder and no spouse or partner present. About 25.8% of all households were made up of individuals and 14.9% had someone living alone who was 65 years of age or older.

There were 9,570 housing units, of which 4.1% were vacant. The homeowner vacancy rate was 0.9% and the rental vacancy rate was 6.7%.

=== Income and poverty ===
As of 2011, the median income for a household in the town was $75,349 while the mean income for a household in the town was $97,222. The median income for a family was $95,108, and the mean income for a family is the highest in Lake County at $117,985. The estimated per capita income for the town was $36,914. About 2.3% of families and 3.1% of the population were estimated to be below the poverty line.

=== 2010 census ===
As of the census of 2010, there were 23,603 people, 9,015 households, and 6,540 families residing in the town. The population density was 3,118.0 inhabitants per square mile (1,203.9/km^{2}). There were 9,393 housing units at an average density of 1,240.8 per square mile (479.1/km^{2}). The racial makeup of the town was 85.6% White, 3.5% African American, 0.2% Native American, 5.8% Asian, 3.1% from other races, and 1.8% from two or more races. Hispanic or Latino of any race were 10.2% of the population.

There were 9,015 households, of which 32.9% had children under the age of 18 living with them, 59.1% were married couples living together, 9.6% had a female householder with no husband present, 3.9% had a male householder with no wife present, and 27.5% were non-families. 24.6% of all households were made up of individuals, and 13.1% had someone living alone who was 65 years of age or older. The average household size was 2.59 and the average family size was 3.10.

The median age in the town was 44.8 years. 23.4% of residents were under the age of 18; 6.8% were between the ages of 18 and 24; 20.1% were from 25 to 44; 30.9% were from 45 to 64; and 18.7% were 65 years of age or older. The gender makeup of the town was 48.0% male and 52.0% female. The average was done in 1999.

=== 2000 census ===
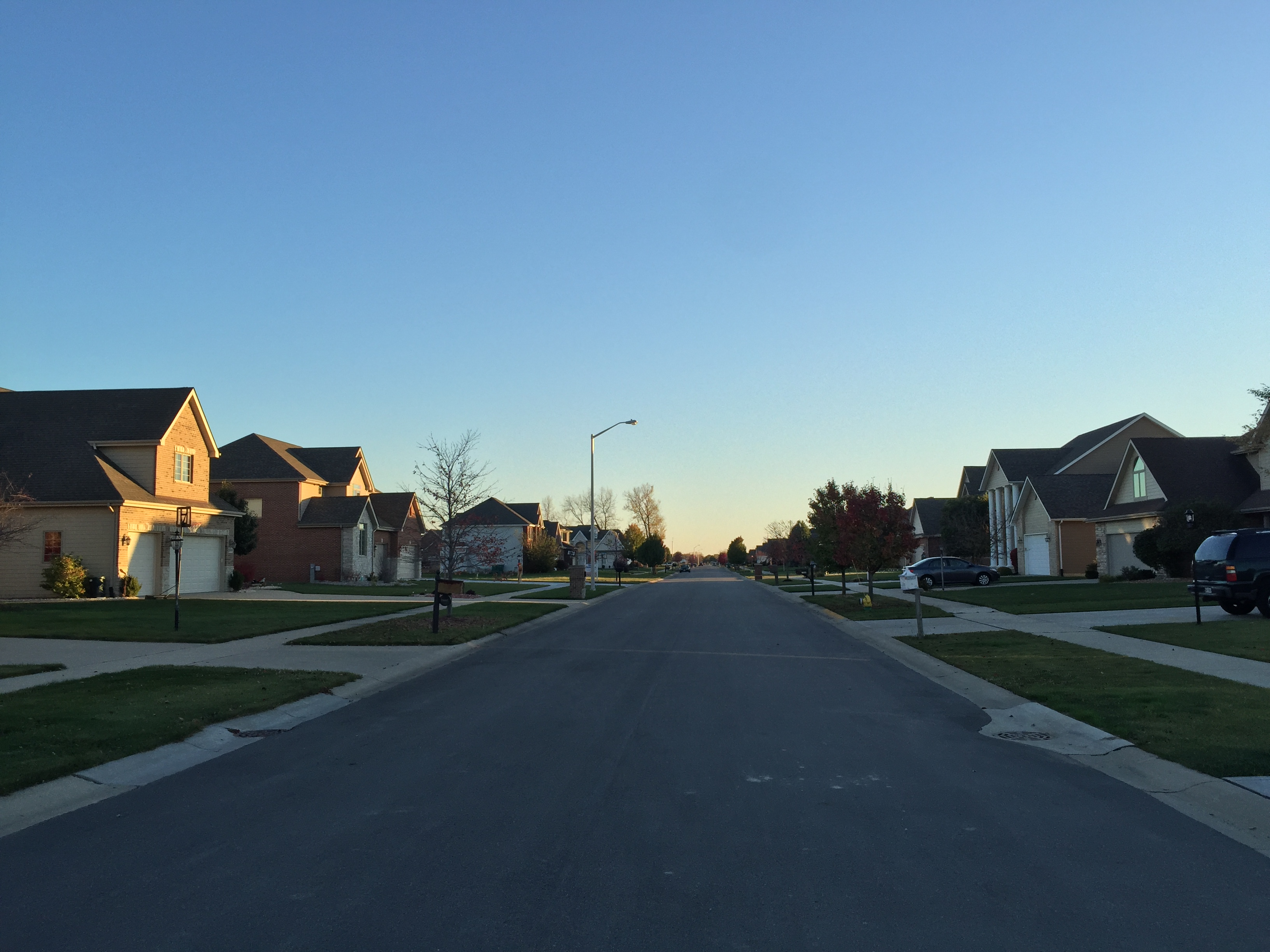
West Lakes neighborhood, established in the late 1990s, is located directly east of the Lansing Municipal Airport.

As of the census of 2000, there were 21,511 people, 8,091 households, and 6,141 families residing in the town. The population density was 2,852.8 inhabitants per square mile (1,101.5/km^{2}). There were 8,339 housing units at an average density of 1,105.9 per square mile (427.0/km^{2}). The racial makeup of the town was 92.28% White, 1.03% African American, 0.06% Native American, 4.49% Asian, 0.02% Pacific Islander, 1.10% from other races, and 1.02% from two or more races. Hispanic or Latino of any race were 4.88% of the population.

There were 8,091 households, out of which 33.2% had children under the age of 18 living with them; 65.5% were married couples living together, 8.0% had a female householder with no husband present, and 24.1% were non-families. 21.8% of all households were made up of individuals, and 12.0% had someone living alone who was 65 years of age or older. The average household size was 2.62 and the average family size was 3.07.

In the town, the population was spread out, with 24.3% under the age of 18, 5.5% from 18 to 24, 24.0% from 25 to 44, 27.5% from 45 to 64, and 18.8% who were 65 years of age or older. The median age was 43 years. For every 100 females, there were 91.9 males. For every 100 females age 18 and over, there were 87.4 males.

The median income for a household in the town was $63,243, and the median income for a family was $74,255. Males had a median income of $53,387 versus $34,490 for females. The per capita income for the town was $30,952. About 2.8% of families and 4.3% of the population were below the poverty line, including 5.2% of those under age 18 and 2.9% of those age 65 or over.

== Businesses and attractions ==
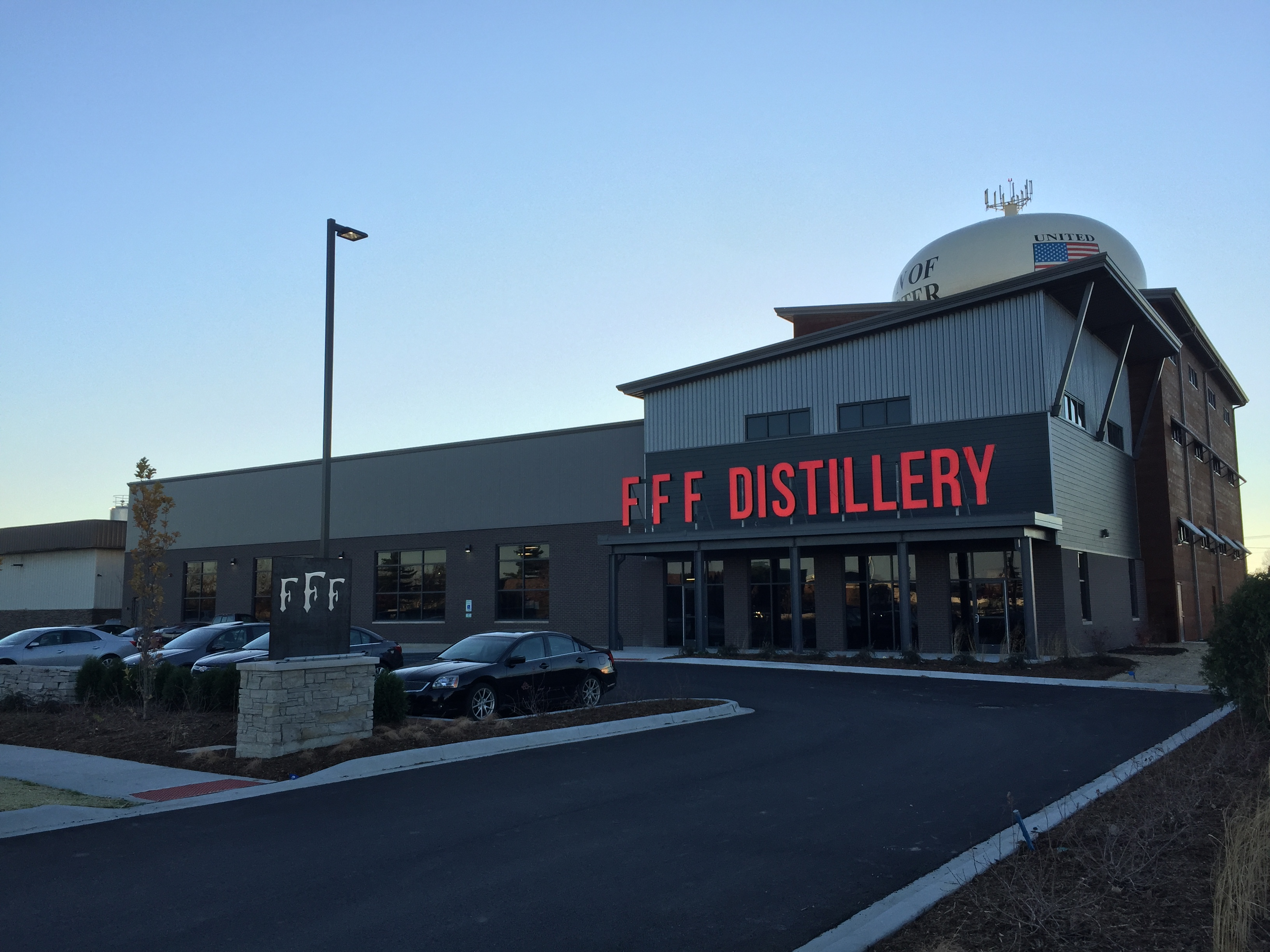
The newest addition to the Three Floyds Brewing Company is the distillery.

The town is home to a number of local, regional and national companies and extensive community resources. Among them are the Community Hospital, the Center for Visual and Performing Arts, The Times of Northwest Indiana newspaper, a PepsiCo bottling and distribution facility, a Whole Foods Market distribution center, the Community Veterans Memorial, the LEED-certified Centennial Park and Golf Course, Kaske House Museum at Heritage Park, Bieker Woods Nature Area, eleven miles of bike paths, an innovative Public Art and Sculpture Program, the new Munster Music Festival, the Munster Centennials Vintage Baseball Team, and the Babe Ruth Baseball.

The town of Munster is also home to the Powers Health (Community Healthcare System) Immediate Care Center. This facility opened in February 2024, and replaced the previous center located on 45th street in Munster. Alongside immediate care, this building houses an occupational health clinic, pediatric, ENT, and family medicine physician offices, and imaging/diagnostic services.

Munster is also home to the Three Floyds Brewing Company, a microbrewery and craft beer-drinker's destination noted for its "Dark Lord Day" event, which draws 6,000 people every April.

=== Lake Business Center ===
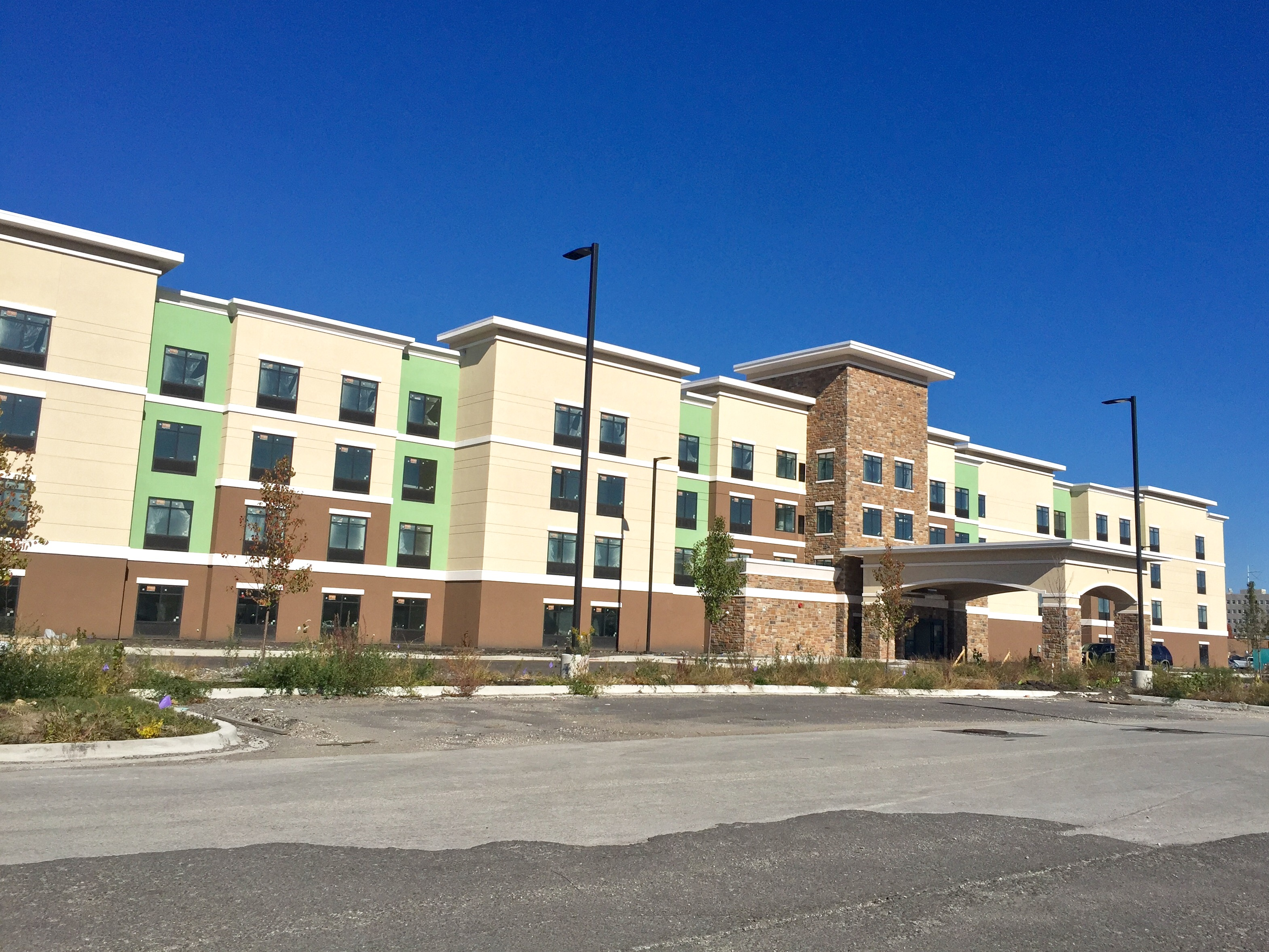
Homewood Suites by Hilton is one of several new additions to the Lake Business Center.

In spring 2011, Simborg Development revitalized plans for a $60 million renovation of the 72-acre Lake Business Center site fronting Calumet Avenue that will open new commercial opportunities for the Town of Munster. This development, originally to be named Munster Town Center that would have created a mixed-use center of retail shops and restaurants, commercial offices, medical facilities as well as an extended-stay hotel, was modified to maintain the warehouse facility and maintain a high-tech image exterior for the development.

A Homewood Suites by Hilton hotel anchors the north end of the development.

=== Centennial Village ===
One of Munster's newest redevelopment projects is the area immediately surrounding the former Munster Steel site, located to the north of the town's Centennial Park. The area, named "Centennial Village," will be a mixed-use transit-oriented development that will feature both retail and multi-unit residential housing once it is completed. The Calumet Avenue grade separation has been planned since the early 1940s, with Henry Ford leading the change. However, American involvement in World War II and the creation of the federal highway system stopped these plans until the present day.

The project will be completed in two phases; it is part of the larger 45th Avenue/Calumet Avenue underpass and realignment project in which Phase 1 includes extending 45th Avenue east into the Centennial Village development with two new stoplights and creating an underpass under the Canadian National railroad tracks to align with 45th at Columbia Avenue. Meanwhile, Phase 2 includes creating an underpass at Calumet Avenue. So far, Phase 1 has been completed.

== Transportation ==
=== Commercial/Private Air ===
The commercial airport closest to Munster is the Gary/Chicago International Airport in Gary, but most Munster residents and visitors travel from Chicago's O'Hare International Airport or the Chicago Midway International Airport. Lansing Municipal Airport, located immediately west of Munster in Lansing, Illinois, serves the area's general aviation market.

=== Major Roads ===
Munster lies just south of the Borman Expressway (I-80/94). Calumet Avenue is a major north–south artery in the town, and becomes U.S. Route 41 just north of the Borman. Interstate 65, the Indiana Toll Road, and U.S. Routes 12, 20, and 30 are within a 20-mile (32 km) radius.

=== Commuter Rail ===
Munster is the site of two stations on the Monon Corridor, a line of the South Shore Line, a commuter rail system running from Downtown Chicago into northern Indiana. The stops are at Munster Ridge and Munster/Dyer stations. They opened on March 31, 2026.

== Education ==
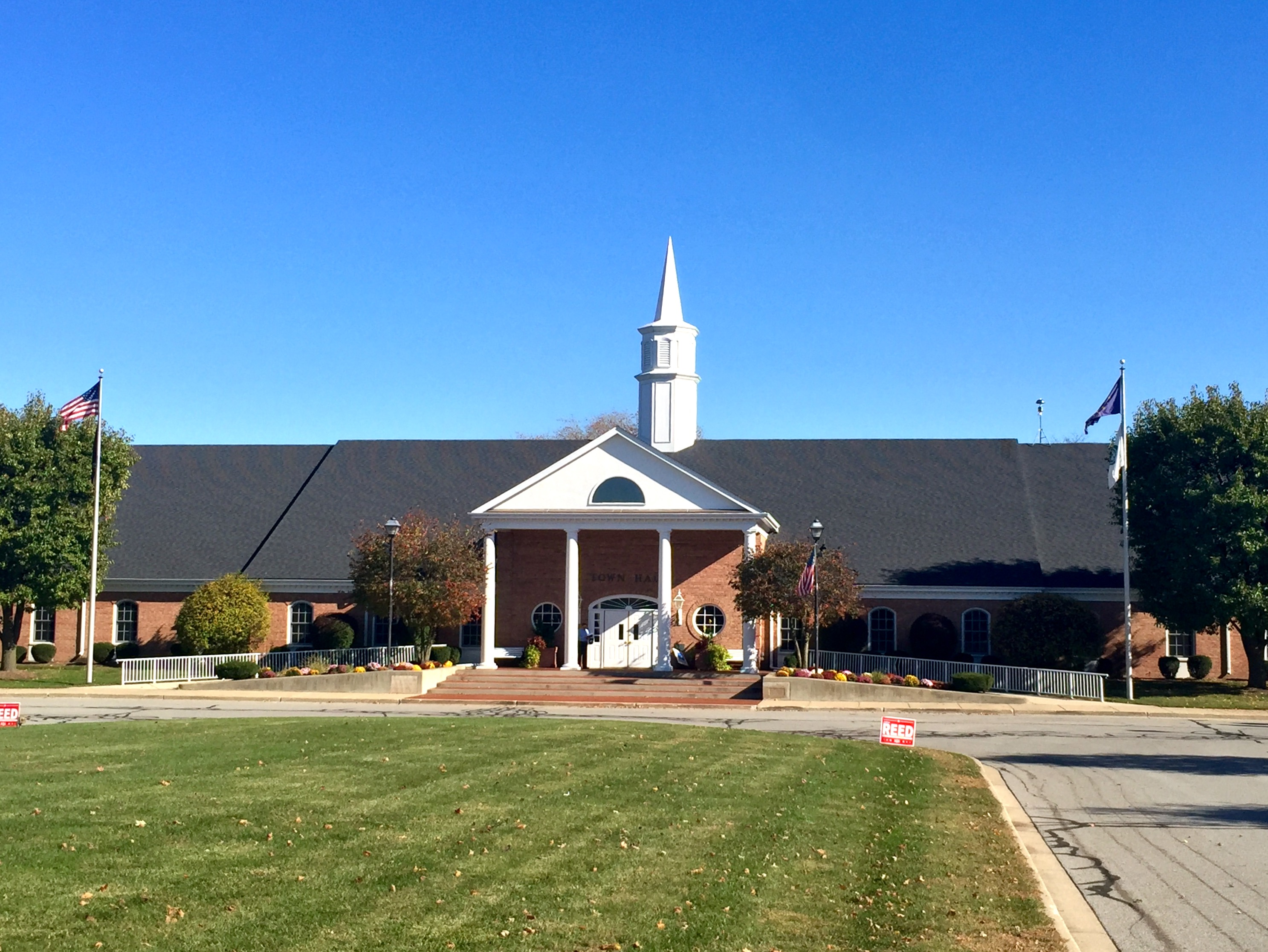
The town hall is located right off Ridge Road, Munster's main historic thoroughfare.

The School Town of Munster is the public school system for all portions of the town. All five schools in the system are recognized as Indiana Blue Ribbon schools and have been awarded five-star ratings. Munster High School is one of several schools from Indiana consistently on Newsweek Top Schools list since 2006. The school is also consistently ranked on The Washington Post since 2011 "The High School Challenge". Additionally, Munster was cited by Neighborhood Scout for offering the best combination of public school quality and affordable neighborhoods in the Chicago Metropolitan Area.. Munster is also rated as the #1 school district in Lake County, Indiana.

In 1875, Munster's school board (which at the time was not officially designated School Town) operated a single three-room school house located on the corner of Calumet Avenue and Ridge Road. According to local records, enrollment did not exceed 50 students in any given year before 1920. In 1913, the school board decided to add a second school building due to increased enrollment. The new Munster school was dedicated in 1915. By the 1940s, the building had expanded to include twelve classrooms, a new gymnasium, and a 60-seat basement auditorium. The school was renamed Lanier School in 1950.

These new additions were not enough to accommodate Munster's rapidly growing population. By 1948, James B. Eads Elementary School was built on Harrison Avenue, for students residing west of Calumet Avenue. In 1952 Earnest R. Elliot Elementary School was built on White Oak Avenue. With the two new elementary schools in operation, Lanier School became a Junior High School (grades 7–9). Following graduation from grade 9, students attended high schools in either Hammond or Highland to complete grades 10–12.

A new, modern facility was planned for the junior high students in the late 1950s. Wilbur Wright Junior High opened in 1960, causing Lanier to downsize to an elementary school. Several classrooms and a resource center were added in the following years. Amid the continuing expansion of the school system, the board gave serious consideration to adding a high school. The initial proposal encompassed a spacious building designed for 1,200 students and included an athletic facility with a swimming pool. However, the cost of more than $6.2 million did not appeal to the public. In response, a modified design was submitted, and construction began in June 1965. The doors to the new high school opened to students in September 1966.

In 1969, a new elementary school was added. Frank H. Hammond boasted 25 classrooms, an auditorium, and a learning center. When the outdated Lanier school's enrollment dipped in the late 1970s, the board decided to close the facility in 1980.

=== Modernization ===
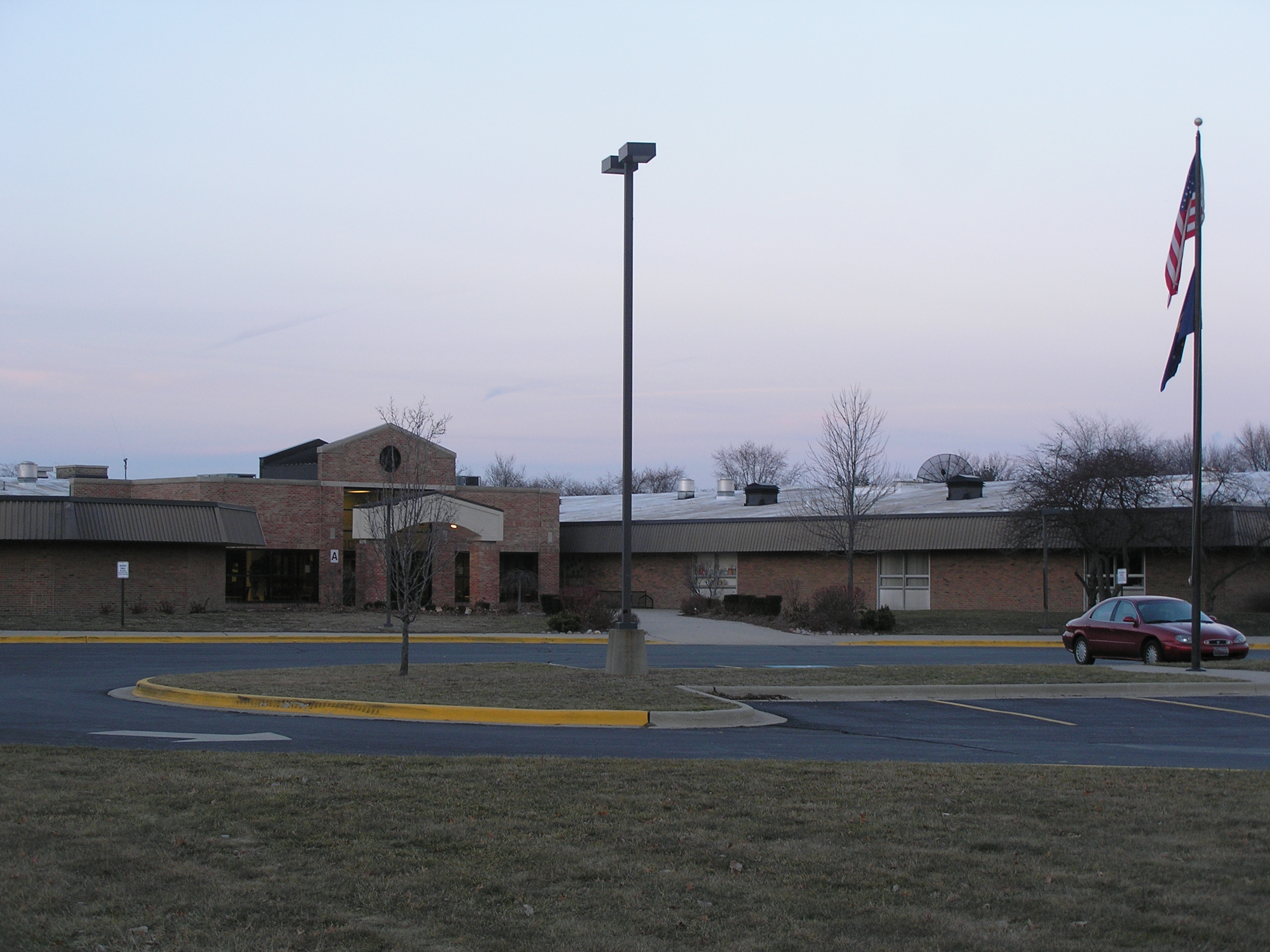
Frank H. Hammond Elementary School is the newest of Munster's three public elementary schools.

As of 2011, two of Munster's three elementary schools have since been completely rebuilt; the new buildings for James B. Eads Elementary and Earnest R. Elliot Elementary were completed in 2003 and 2006, respectively. Wilbur Wright Middle School has undergone significant expansions and renovations as well. Munster High School dedicated a state-of-the-art football, track and soccer complex in 2010, as well as a $17,000,000 Aquatic Center in January 2011. The latter facility is one of two scholastic aquatic centers in Indiana and the only one that is connected to a high school (the other is IUPUI's natatorium). In 2012, a two-story classroom addition was constructed at Munster High School to accommodate the growing student population.

The School Town of Munster implemented a curriculum/technology initiative termed 1 to 1 Technology for the 2011–2012 school year. Designed to enhance the school system's instructional technology infrastructure, the program provides leases on laptop computers to all students in grades 5–12. Initially focused on STEM fields curricula, the impact of the initiative is eventually expected to reach all subjects, and will better accommodate web-based student assessments.

=== Private schools ===
Two private schools are located in Munster; St. Thomas More Parish added a school in 1949, available to and St. Paul's Lutheran school is located at 8601 Harrison Ave, and was founded in Hammond in 1886. The church and school moved to Munster in 1981. Both schools are available to elementary and middle school students.

List of schools – School Town of Munster

- Munster High School
- Wilbur Wright Middle School
- Ernest R. Elliott Elementary School
- James B. Eads Elementary School
- Frank H. Hammond Elementary School

List of schools – Private/Parochial

- St. Paul's Pre-school, Elementary, and Middle School (Lutheran Church–Missouri Synod)
- St. Thomas More Elementary and Middle School (Catholic, Diocese of Gary)

== Recreation ==
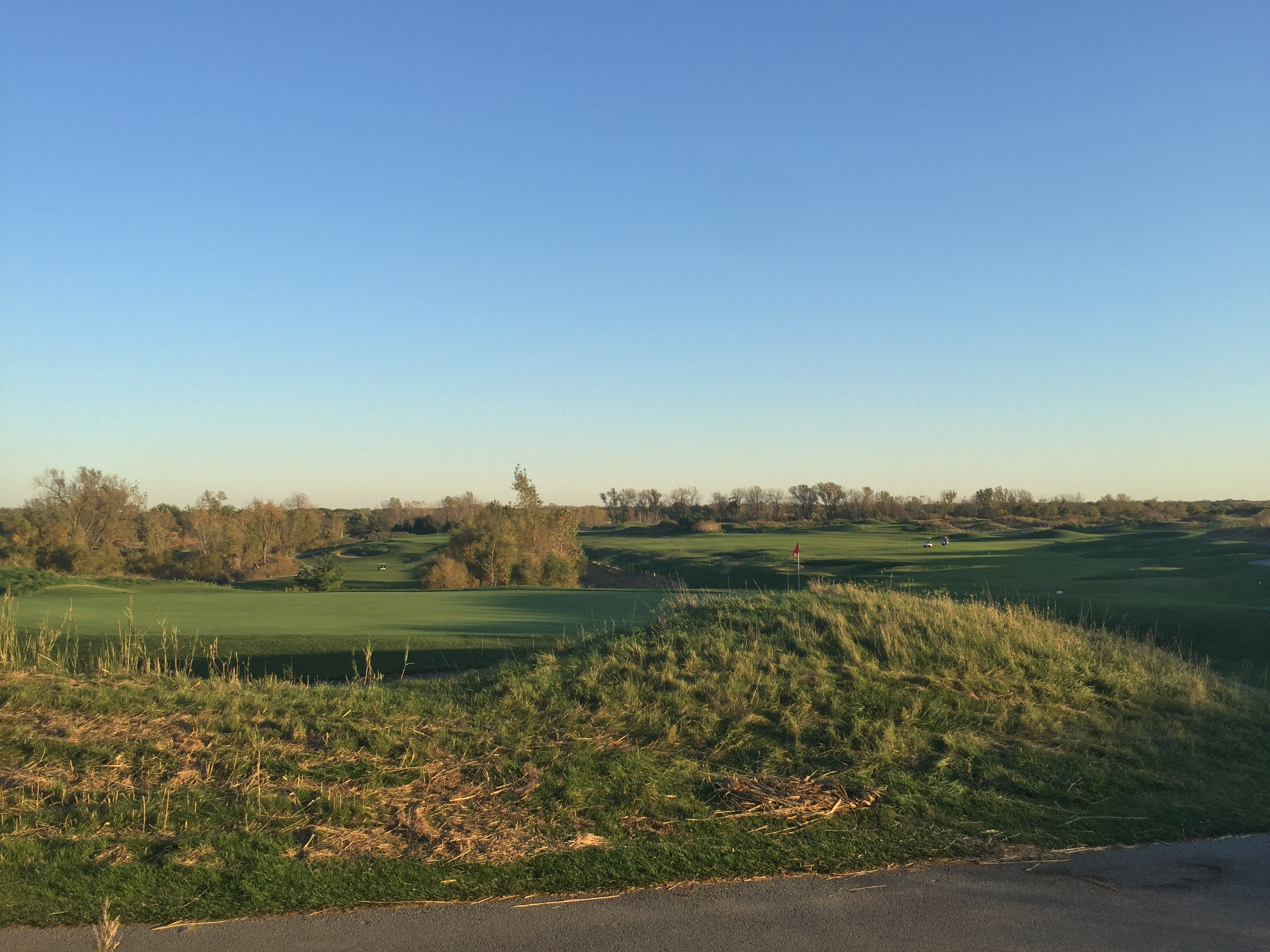
Centennial Park's nine-hole golf course was designed by Ted Nugent Golf in Vernon Hills, Illinois.

Munster has ten parks, three lakes, a nine-hole golf course and driving range, eleven miles (18 km) of bike paths, an innovative public art and sculpture program, and two recreational points of interest. Centennial Park, the newest and largest of these facilities, was built on a former landfill and opened in 2007. This award-winning park incorporates several environmentally-friendly design elements conformant to the LEED Silver guidelines. Methane gas from the landfill is captured and converted into electricity to power the park.

Centennial Park's amenities include a clubhouse with green roof and banquet facilities, The View restaurant with outdoor seating, a nine-hole (Tim Nugent of Nugent Golf in Vernon Hills, Illinois.) designed golf course and driving range, a live stage amphitheater, a lake with two bridges, three fountains, fishing opportunities, and a boardwalk, a sculpture walk (in progress), formal botanical gardens, outdoor pavilions, walking trails, access to the Pennsy Greenway, a 3-acre dog park, and soccer fields. Events held at Centennial Park include Munster Music Festival, Grape Escape Wine Festival, July 4 fireworks displays over the lake, and an outdoor movie series.

Community Park is another popular Munster park and hosts the town's annual Car and Motorcycle Show. Features of this facility include an outdoor swimming complex, a skate park, lighted tennis courts, playgrounds, baseball fields, a basketball court, a social center, and picnic areas. The park is located immediately east of the Lake County Public Library's Munster branch.

Little League Baseball was first organized in the town in 1952, and Babe Ruth Baseball was established in 1954. Munster's Babe Ruth All-Star teams have won six state championships since 1985.

List of parks and recreational facilities – Munster Parks & Recreation

- Beech Park
- Bieker Woods Nature Area
- Bluebird Park
- Briar Creek Park
- Burlwood Park
- Centennial Park
- Cobblestones Park
- Community Park
- Circle Park
- Evergreen Park
- Frank H. Hammond Park
- Grove Park
- Heritage Park & Kaske House Museum
- Military Memorial Park
- Munster Pool
- Orchard Park
- Rotary Park
- Sommerset Park
- Stewart Park
- Sunnyside Park
- Twin Creek Park
- White Oak Park
- The Veterans War Memorial

== Notable people ==
- Stephan Bonnar, mixed martial artist
- Todd Donoho, radio and television sportscaster, who hosts the post-game show for Missouri Tigers basketball on the statewide Tiger Radio Network
- Nan Hayworth, former U.S. Representative for New York's 19th congressional district
- Sue Hendrickson, paleontologist
- Irene Herlocker-Meyer, environmental activist
- Jack Hyles, minister and pastor of First Baptist Church of Hammond
- Tony Kanal, musician from band No Doubt
- Mark Kruzan, former mayor of Bloomington, Indiana, state politician
- Jeff Lee, former international freestyle swimmer
- Joe Mansueto, founder and CEO of Morningstar, Inc.
- Don McCune, former professional bowler, member of the PBA and USBC Halls of Fame
- Ryan McMahen, professional soccer player
- Hal Morris, Major League Baseball player
- Mara Candelaria Reardon, former Democratic member of the Indiana House of Representatives
- Jerome Reppa, lawyer and politician
- Todd Rokita, Attorney General of Indiana; Secretary of State of Indiana; U.S. Representative
- John V. Sullivan, former Parliamentarian of the United States House of Representatives from 2004 to 2012

== See also ==
- Calumet Shoreline
