= Lansing, Illinois =

Village in the United States

- Village
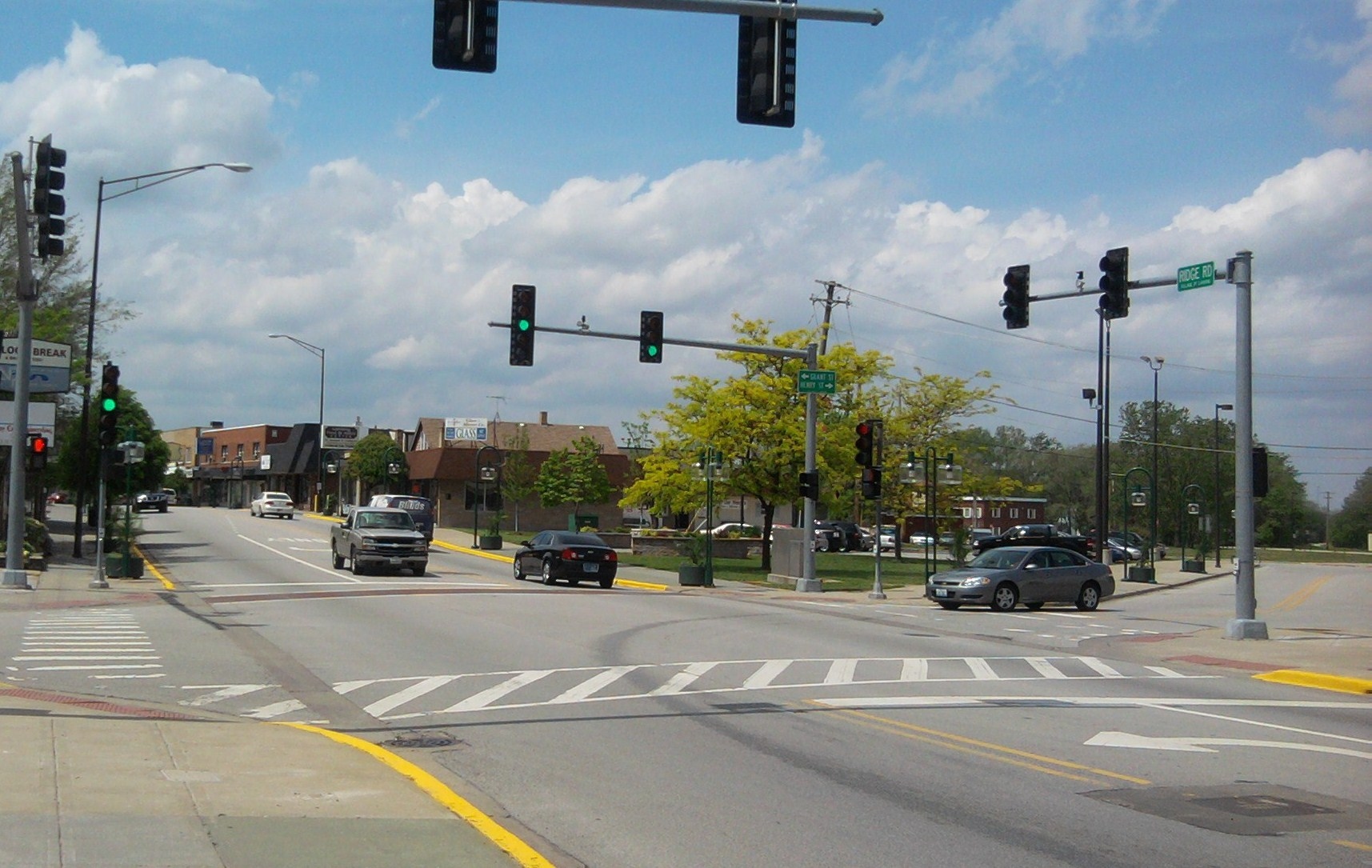
- Ridge Road in downtown Lansing

- Flag Seal
- Motto(s): "A community of pride, progress, and possibilities"
- Location of Lansing in Cook County, Illinois.

- Location within Greater Chicago Location within Illinois Location within the United States
- Coordinates: 41°33′57″N 87°32′45″W
- Country: United States
- State: Illinois
- County: Cook
- Townships: Thornton, Bloom
- Incorporated: 1893

Government
  - Type: Mayor-Trustee
  - Body: Board of Trustees
  - Mayor: Brian Hardy
  - Trustees: Saad Abbasy, Ernst Lamothe Jr., Amy Nommensen, Lionel Valencia, Micaela Smith, and Jerry Zeldenrust

Area
  - Total: 7.52 sq mi (19.48 km^{2})
  - Land: 7.46 sq mi (19.33 km^{2})
  - Water: 0.058 sq mi (0.15 km^{2}) 0.88%

Population (2020)
  - Total: 29,076
  - Density: 3,896.4/sq mi (1,504.42/km^{2})

Standard of living (2009-11)
  - Per capita income: $24,329
  - Median home value: $148,500
- ZIP code(s): 60438
- Area code(s): 708
- Geocode: 42028
- FIPS code: 17-42028
- Website: villageoflansing.org

Lansing is a village in Cook County, Illinois, United States. Lansing is a south suburb of Chicago. The population was 29,076 at the 2020 census.

== History ==
The first family to settle in Lansing was that of August Hildebrandt in 1843. Henry, George, and John Lansing settled the area in 1846, which was incorporated in 1893. Early settlement in the village was primarily by Dutch and German immigrants. Industrial development of the surrounding Calumet region attracted immigrants from Ireland and Eastern Europe to the village in the 20th century. These settlement patterns are reflected in Lansing's current demographics; according to the census the top five ancestries that were in Lansing in 2000 were German (17%), Polish (13%), Irish (13%), Dutch (11%), and Italian (7%). However, according to City-data.com 2016 estimates, these ancestries began to change in the mid-90s and early 2000s, when most residents were of African American ancestry (8,871), followed by Latinos (4,183), and Asian (Southeast Asian) (255).

== Geography ==
Lansing is 6.9 miles (11.1 km) south of the Chicago city limits at 138th Street, and 25.6 miles (41.2 km) from the Chicago Loop.

According to the 2021 census gazetteer files, Lansing has a total area of 7.52 square miles (19.48 km^{2}), of which 7.46 square miles (19.32 km^{2}) (or 99.24%) is land and 0.06 square miles (0.16 km^{2}) (or 0.76%) is water. Lansing sits on the Calumet Shoreline, an ancient shoreline of Lake Michigan.

=== Surrounding areas ===
Lansing is bordered by South Holland to the northwest, Calumet City to the north, Hammond to the northeast, Munster to the east and southeast, Lynwood to the south, Glenwood to the southwest, and Thornton to the west.

Calumet City
South Holland Hammond
Thornton Munster
Glenwood Munster
Lynwood

== Demographics ==
Historical population
Census	Pop.	Note	%±
1900	830		—
1910	1,060		27.7%
1920	1,409		32.9%
1930	3,378		139.7%
1940	4,462		32.1%
1950	8,682		94.6%
1960	17,475		101.3%
1970	22,916		31.1%
1980	28,958		26.4%
1990	28,131		−2.9%
2000	28,332		0.7%
2010	28,331		0.0%
2020	29,076		2.6%
U.S. Decennial Census; 2010 2020

=== Racial and ethnic composition ===
Lansing village, Illinois – Racial and ethnic composition Note: the US Census treats Hispanic/Latino as an ethnic category. This table excludes Latinos from the racial categories and assigns them to a separate category. Hispanics/Latinos may be of any race.
Race / Ethnicity (NH = Non-Hispanic)	Pop 2000	Pop 2010	Pop 2020	% 2000	% 2010	% 2020
White alone (NH)	23,238	14,681	8,462	82.02%	51.82%	29.10%
Black or African American alone (NH)	2,983	8,847	13,421	10.53%	31.23%	46.16%
Native American or Alaska Native alone (NH)	22	38	26	0.08%	0.13%	0.09%
Asian alone (NH)	201	255	264	0.71%	0.90%	0.91%
Native Hawaiian or Pacific Islander alone (NH)	12	5	3	0.04%	0.02%	0.01%
Other race alone (NH)	21	39	172	0.07%	0.14%	0.59%
Mixed race or Multiracial (NH)	231	363	734	0.82%	1.28%	2.52%
Hispanic or Latino (any race)	1,624	4,103	5,993	5.73%	14.48%	20.61%
Total	28,332	28,331	29,076	100.00%	100.00%	100.00%

=== 2020 census ===
As of the 2020 census, Lansing had a population of 29,076, and 6,818 families resided in the village. The population density was 3,867.00 inhabitants per square mile (1,493.06/km^{2}). The median age was 40.0 years. 22.9% of residents were under the age of 18 and 16.4% of residents were 65 years of age or older. For every 100 females, there were 87.7 males, and for every 100 females age 18 and over there were 82.7 males age 18 and over.

100.0% of residents lived in urban areas, while 0.0% lived in rural areas.

There were 11,285 households in Lansing, of which 31.6% had children under the age of 18 living in them. Of all households, 38.2% were married-couple households, 18.7% were households with a male householder and no spouse or partner present, and 37.5% were households with a female householder and no spouse or partner present. About 29.9% of all households were made up of individuals, and 12.2% had someone living alone who was 65 years of age or older.

There were 12,053 housing units at an average density of 1,603.01 per square mile (618.93/km^{2}). Of all housing units, 6.4% were vacant. The homeowner vacancy rate was 2.9% and the rental vacancy rate was 8.8%.

=== Demographic estimates ===
The average household size was 3.23 and the average family size was 2.56.

=== Income and poverty ===
The median income for a household in the village was $57,659, and the median income for a family was $70,775. Males had a median income of $47,236 versus $31,684 for females. The per capita income for the village was $28,708. About 12.4% of families and 16.7% of the population were below the poverty line, including 27.8% of those under age 18 and 5.3% of those age 65 or over.

== Government ==
The current mayor of Lansing is Brian Hardy, while the board of trustees is composed of Saad Abbasy, Lionel Valencia, Ernst Lamothe Jr., Amy Nommensen, Micaela Smith, and Jerry Zeldenrust. Maureen Grady-Perovich is the Village Clerk.

Lansing is represented in the United States Congress by Representative Robin Kelly, of Illinois's 2nd congressional district, as well as Senators Dick Durbin and Tammy Duckworth in the United States Senate.

== Education ==
- College
  - Visible Music College Chicago Branch
- Public high schools
  - Thornton Fractional South
- Private high schools
  - American School of Correspondence
- Public primary and middle schools
  - Memorial Junior High School
  - Nathan Hale Elementary School
  - Heritage Middle School
  - Oak Glen Elementary School
  - Reavis Elementary School
  - Coolidge Elementary School
- Private primary and middle schools
  - Lansing Christian School
  - Eagle Academy

== Infrastructure ==
=== Transportation ===
Pace provides bus service connecting Lansing to destinations across the Southland. Lansing is also served by the Grand Trunk Western Main Line between Chicago and Port Huron.

Lansing commuters to Chicago are also served by Munster Ridge station, a South Shore Line rail station in Munster, Indiana, located on the Monon Corridor line. It opened to revenue service on March 31, 2026. There are no published plans for PACE connectivity to the train station at this time.

== Notable people ==
- Bill W. Balthis (1936–2016), Illinois state representative, mayor of Lansing, and businessman
- Tom Gorzelanny, pitcher for the Milwaukee Brewers, spent part of his childhood in Lansing
- Curtis Granderson, outfielder for the New York Mets, graduated from Thornton Fractional South High School
- Jim O'Heir, actor best known for portraying Jerry Gergich in the television sitcom Parks and Recreation
- Nnamdi Ogbonnaya, Musician
- Harry Smith, former co-anchor for CBS' The Early Show and the host of A&E's Biography series
- Pierre Thomas, running back for the New Orleans Saints, graduated from Thornton Fractional South High School
- Jack E. Walker, Illinois politician, practiced law in Lansing.

== See also ==
- Lansing Municipal Airport
- North Creek Woods
