= Illinois's 7th House of Representatives district =

American legislative district

Illinois's 7th State House of Representatives district
Representative
Emanuel "Chris" Welch; D–Hillside
since 2013
- Demographics: 30.5% White; 41.4% Black; 21.9% Hispanic; 3.1% Asian; 0.1% Native American; 0.0% Hawaiian/Pacific Islander; 0.4% Other; 2.5% Multiracial
- Population (2020): 109,744
- Created: 1983–present 1849–1873, 1957–1973

Illinois's 7th House of Representatives district is a Representative district within the Illinois House of Representatives located in Cook County, Illinois and DuPage County, Illinois. It has been represented by Democratic Illinois House Speaker Chris Welch since January 9, 2013. Democrat Cory Foster was the previous incumbent for a couple of months.

Located in the Chicago metropolitan area, the district covers all or parts of Bellwood, Berkeley, Broadview, Elmhurst, Forest Park, Hillside, Hinsdale, La Grange Park, Maywood, Melrose Park, Northlake, Oak Brook, River Forest, Westchester, and Western Springs.

== Representative district history ==
Prior to the ratification of the 1848 Illinois Constitution, counties (or two or more counties) were designated a certain number of Senators and Representatives. With the ratification of the 1848 Illinois Constitution, Legislative and Representative districts were numbered and called by name. Each district was still assigned a certain number of Senators and Representatives. After the passage of the 1872 Apportionment, only Legislative districts were drawn with Representatives elected cumulatively. The 1954 amendment to the 1870 Illinois Constitution established Representative districts as separate from Legislative districts (with representatives still elected cumulatively). The boundaries of Representative and Legislative districts would differ. After the United States Supreme Court ruled in Reynolds v. Sims (1964) that "both houses of state legislatures must be apportioned according to districts of equal population," new districts were redrawn for the Illinois Senate and Illinois House of Representatives. While the Legislative districts were redrawn, the Governor and General Assembly failed to agree on Representative district boundaries. Under the 1954 amendment, "a 10-man bipartisan commission appointed by the governor from recommendations made by both parties" were directed to redraw boundaries but failed to do so in 1963. Because of this failure, and with no district boundaries redrawn, all Representative districts were temporarily merged into one at-large district with 177 representatives (the total number of representatives at the time). The 1964 Illinois House election had several candidates running for all 177 seats throughout the state. In 1965, the Representative districts were redrawn by the Illinois Legislative Reapportionment Commission and elections held in 1966 were done with separate districts. With the 1971 Apportionment (and adoption of the 1970 Illinois Constitution), Representative districts were abolished and representatives were once again elected cumulatively per Legislative district. After the passage of the Cutback Amendment in 1980, the number of Representatives was reduced from 177 to 118 with Representative districts re-established and now electing a single representative.

== Prominent representatives ==
Representative	Notes
John Cullerton	Elected President of the Illinois Senate (2009 – 2020)
Emanuel Chris Welch	Elected the 70th Speaker of the Illinois House of Representatives (2021 – present)

== List of representatives ==
=== 1849 – 1873 ===
Representative	Party	Years (Note: From 1870 to 1970, the GA met for a new session on the Wednesday after the first Monday of January.)	General Assembly (GA)	Electoral history	Counties represented
7th Representative district established with 1848 Illinois Constitution.
Samuel Snowden Hayes	Democratic	January 1, 1849 – January 6, 1851	16th	Elected in 1848; Was not re-elected in 1850.	White
Samuel H. Martin	Unknown	January 6, 1851 – January 3, 1853	17th	Elected in 1850; Was not re-elected in 1852.	White
Daniel L. Jones	Democratic	January 3, 1853 – January 1, 1855	18th	Elected in 1852; Was not re-elected in 1854.	White
P. E. Hosmer	Democratic	January 1, 1855 – January 5, 1857	19th	Elected in 1854; Was not re-elected in 1856.	Perry; Washington
Hawkins S. Osborn	Unknown	January 5, 1857 – January 3, 1859	20th	Elected in 1856; Was not re-elected in 1858.	Perry; Washington
John D. Wood	Democratic	January 3, 1859 – January 7, 1861	21st	Elected in 1858; Was not re-elected in 1860.	Perry; Washington
Orson Kellogg	Unknown	January 7, 1861 – January 5, 1863	22nd	Elected in 1860; Was not re-elected in 1862.	Perry; Washington
James R. Ford	Unknown	January 5, 1863 – January 2, 1865	23rd	Elected in 1862; Was not re-elected in 1864.	Clinton; Washington
Isaac Miller	Union	January 2, 1865 – January 7, 1867	24th	Elected in 1864; Was not re-elected in 1866.	Clinton; Washington
Daniel Hay	Unknown	January 7, 1867 – January 4, 1869	25th	Elected in 1866; Was not re-elected in 1868.	Clinton; Washington
George Gundlach	Republican	January 4, 1869 – January 4, 1871	26th	Elected in 1868; Was not re-elected in 1870.	Clinton; Washington
Addison Reese, Jr.	Democratic	January 4, 1871 – January 8, 1873	27th	Elected in 1870; Was not re-elected in 1872.	Williamson
District abolished with 1872 Reapportionment as 3 Representatives were now elected cumulatively from Legislative districts.

=== 1957 – 1973 ===
Representative	Party	Party Control	Years (Note: Since 1970, the GA meets on the second Wednesday of January for a new session.)	General Assembly (GA)	Electoral history	Counties represented
District re-established in 1957.
Frances L. Dawson	Republican	2 Republicans; 1 Democrat	January 9, 1957 – January 6, 1965	70th 71st 72nd 73rd	Elected in 1956; Re-elected in 1958; Re-elected in 1960; Re-elected in 1962; Ran in the At-large district election and won re-election in 1964.	Cook
Marion E. Burks	Republican	2 Republicans; 1 Democrat	January 9, 1957 – January 9, 1963	70th 71st 72nd	Elected in 1956; Re-elected in 1958; Re-elected in 1960; Ran for Republican nomination in Illinois's 13th congressional district in 1962 and lost.	Cook
Jeanne Hurley Simon	Democratic	2 Republicans; 1 Democrat	January 9, 1957 – January 4, 1961	70th 71st	Elected in 1956; Re-elected in 1958; Retired.	Cook
Robert Marks	Democratic	2 Republicans; 1 Democrat	January 4, 1961 – January 6, 1965	72nd 73rd	Elected in 1960; Re-elected in 1962; Retired.	Cook
Alan R. Johnston	Republican	2 Republicans; 1 Democrat	January 9, 1963 – January 6, 1965	73rd	Elected in 1962; Ran in the At-large district election and won re-election in 1964.	Cook
The district was temporarily abolished from 1965 to 1967 due to the Redistricting Commission in 1963 failing to reach an agreement. An at-large election was held electing 177 Representatives from across the state.
Joseph G. Sevcik	Republican	2 Republicans; 1 Democrat	January 4, 1967 – January 10, 1973	75th 76th 77th	Elected in 1966; Re-elected in 1968; Re-elected in 1970; Redistricted to the 7th Legislative District and re-elected in 1972.	Cook
Henry Klosak	Republican	2 Republicans; 1 Democrat	January 4, 1967 – January 10, 1973	75th 76th 77th	Elected in 1966; Re-elected in 1968; Re-elected in 1970; Redistricted to the 7th Legislative District and re-elected in 1972.	Cook
Gerald W. Shea	Democratic	2 Republicans; 1 Democrat	January 4, 1967 – January 10, 1973	75th 76th 77th	Elected in 1966; Re-elected in 1968; Re-elected in 1970; Redistricted to the 7th Legislative District and re-elected in 1972.	Cook
District abolished with 1971 Reapportionment as Representatives were once again elected from Legislative districts.

=== 1983 – Present ===
Representative	Party	Years	General Assembly (GA)	Electoral history	Counties represented
District re-established with representatives now elected one per district with the passage of the Cutback Amendment
John Cullerton	Democratic	January 12, 1983 – January 31, 1991	83rd 84th 85th 86th	Redistricted from 12th Legislative district and re-elected in 1982; Re-elected in 1984; Re-elected in 1986; Re-elected in 1988; Re-elected in 1990; Appointed to the 6th Legislative district in 1991.	Cook
John Cullerton	Democratic	January 12, 1983 – January 31, 1991	87th	Redistricted from 12th Legislative district and re-elected in 1982; Re-elected in 1984; Re-elected in 1986; Re-elected in 1988; Re-elected in 1990; Appointed to the 6th Legislative district in 1991.	Cook
Vacant		January 31, 1991 – 1991	87th		Cook
Ann Stepan	Democratic	1991 – January 13, 1993	87th	Appointed in 1991; Retired.	Cook
Eugene Moore	Democratic	January 13, 1993 – January 1999	88th 89th 90th	Elected in 1992; Re-elected in 1994; Re-elected in 1996; Re-elected in 1998; Appointed Cook County Recorder of Deeds in January 1999.	Cook
Eugene Moore	Democratic	January 13, 1993 – January 1999	91st	Elected in 1992; Re-elected in 1994; Re-elected in 1996; Re-elected in 1998; Appointed Cook County Recorder of Deeds in January 1999.	Cook
Vacant		January 1999 – January 29, 1999	91st		Cook
Wanda Sharp	Democratic	January 29, 1999 – January 10, 2001	91st	Appointed in 1999; Lost renomination in 2000.	Cook
Karen Yarbrough	Democratic	January 10, 2001 – December 2012	92nd 93rd 94th 95th 96th	Elected in 2000; Re-elected in 2002; Re-elected in 2004; Re-elected in 2006; Re-elected in 2008; Re-elected in 2010; Elected Cook County Recorder of Deeds in 2012 and resigned in December.	Cook
Karen Yarbrough	Democratic	January 10, 2001 – December 2012	97th	Elected in 2000; Re-elected in 2002; Re-elected in 2004; Re-elected in 2006; Re-elected in 2008; Re-elected in 2010; Elected Cook County Recorder of Deeds in 2012 and resigned in December.	Cook
Vacant		December 2012 – December 2012	97th		Cook
Cory Foster	Democratic	December 2012 – January 9, 2013	97th	Appointed in 2012 for the remainder of Yarbrough's term.	Cook
Emanuel Chris Welch	Democratic	January 9, 2013 – present	98th 99th 100th 101st 102nd 103rd	Elected in 2012; Re-elected in 2014; Re-elected in 2016; Re-elected in 2018; Re-elected in 2020; Re-elected in 2022	Cook

== Historic District Boundaries ==
Years	County	Municipalities/Townships	Notes
2023 – present	Cook; DuPage	Bellwood, Berkeley, Broadview, Elmhurst, Forest Park, Hillside, Hinsdale, La Grange Park, Maywood, Melrose Park, Northlake, Oak Brook, River Forest, Westchester, Western Springs	
2013 – 2023	Cook; DuPage	Bellwood, Berkeley, Broadview, Forest Park, Hillside, La Grange Park, Maywood, Melrose Park, Northlake, Oak Brook, River Forest, Westchester, Western Springs	
2003 – 2013	Cook	Chicago	
1993 – 2003	Cook	Chicago	
1983 – 1993	Cook	Chicago	
1967 – 1973	Cook	Parts of Berwyn Township, Cicero Township, parts of Lyons Township, parts of Proviso Township, Riverside Township, and parts of Stickney Township	
1957 – 1965	Cook	Evanston Township, New Trier Township, and parts of Northfield Township	
1871 – 1873	Williamson	Attila, Bainbridge, Blainesville, Bolton, Carterville, Crab Orchard, Fredonia, Grainville, Jeffersonville, Loeust Grove, Marion, Sarahsville, Sugar Creek, Sulphur Spring,	
1863 – 1871	Clinton; Washington	Ashley, Aviston, Breese, Carlyle, Clement, Clifton, Collins, Coloma, Covington, Elkhorn, Glass, Grants Point, Hoyleton, Jamestown, Keyesport, Looking Glass, Nashville, Okaw (Okawville), Pleasant Grove, Richview, Sassafras Hill, Trenton, Venedy, Wertenberg	
1855 – 1863	Perry; Washington	9 Mile Prairie, Appleton, Ashley, Centralia, Colonia, Covington, Denmark, Du Quoin, Elkhorn, Galum, Grand Cote, Grand Point, Mt. Hawkins, Nashville, Okaw (Okawville), Old Du Quoin, Pinckneyville, Prairie, Richview, St. Johns, Sassafras Hill, Tamaroa, Venedy	
1849 – 1855	White	Bon Pas, Burnt Prairie, Carmi, Concord, Duncanton, Emma, Enfield, Grayville, Phillipstown, Tecumseh	

== Electoral history ==
=== 2030 – 2022 ===
2022 Illinois House of Representatives election
Party	Candidate	Votes	%	±%
Democratic	Emanuel "Chris" Welch (incumbent)	25,112	77.69	−22.31%
Republican	Eddie L. Kornegay, Jr.	7210	22.31	N/A
Total votes		32,322	100.0	

=== 2020 – 2012 ===
2020 Illinois House of Representatives election
Party	Candidate	Votes	%	±%
Democratic	Emanuel "Chris" Welch (incumbent)	43,883	100.0	N/A
Total votes		43,883	100.0	

2018 Illinois House of Representatives election
Party	Candidate	Votes	%	±%
Democratic	Emanuel "Chris" Welch (incumbent)	35,678	100.0	N/A
Total votes		35,678	100.0	

2016 Illinois House of Representatives election
Party	Candidate	Votes	%	±%
Democratic	Emanuel "Chris" Welch (incumbent)	39,914	100.0	N/A
Total votes		39,914	100.0	

2014 Illinois House of Representatives election
Party	Candidate	Votes	%	±%
Democratic	Emanuel "Chris" Welch (incumbent)	26,839	100.0	N/A
Total votes		26,839	100.0	

2012 Illinois House of Representatives election
Party	Candidate	Votes	%	±%
Democratic	Emanuel "Chris" Welch	35,505	100.0	+11.65%
Total votes		35,505	100.0	

=== 2010 – 2002 ===
2010 Illinois House of Representatives election
Party	Candidate	Votes	%	±%
Democratic	Karen A. Yarbrough (incumbent)	25,260	88.35	−11.65%
Independent	Princess Cynthia Dempsey	3,332	11.65	N/A
Total votes		28,592	100.0	

2008 Illinois House of Representatives election
Party	Candidate	Votes	%	±%
Democratic	Karen A. Yarbrough (incumbent)	40,054	100.0	N/A
Total votes		40,054	100.0	

2006 Illinois House of Representatives election
Party	Candidate	Votes	%	±%
Democratic	Karen A. Yarbrough (incumbent)	24,769	100.0	N/A
Total votes		24,769	100.0	

2004 Illinois House of Representatives election
Party	Candidate	Votes	%	±%
Democratic	Karen A. Yarbrough (incumbent)	37,105	100.0	+15.25%
Total votes		37,105	100.0	

2002 Illinois House of Representatives election
Party	Candidate	Votes	%	±%
Democratic	Karen A. Yarbrough (incumbent)	22,582	84.75	−15.25%
Republican	Byron F. Reed	4,062	15.25	N/A
Total votes		26,644	100.0	

=== 2000 – 1992 ===
2000 Illinois House of Representatives election
Party	Candidate	Votes	%	±%
Democratic	Karen A. Yarbrough	31,789	100.0	N/A
Total votes		31,789	100.0	

2000 Illinois House of Representatives Democratic primary
Party	Candidate	Votes	%
Democratic	Karen A. Yarbrough	5,733	45.33
Democratic	Wanda J. Sharp (incumbent)	5,435	42.97
Democratic	William B. Sullivan	1,479	11.69
Total votes		12,647	100.0

1998 Illinois House of Representatives election
Party	Candidate	Votes	%	±%
Democratic	Eugene Moore (incumbent)	23,701	100.0	+15.47%
Total votes		23,701	100.0	

1996 Illinois House of Representatives election
Party	Candidate	Votes	%	±%
Democratic	Eugene "Gene" Moore (incumbent)	26,498	84.53	+5.46%
Republican	June Edvenson	4,851	15.47	−5.46%
Total votes		31,349	100.0	

1994 Illinois House of Representatives election
Party	Candidate	Votes	%	±%
Democratic	Eugene "Gene" Moore (incumbent)	16,102	79.07	+4.10%
Republican	Joann Tate	4,261	20.93	+5.63%
Total votes		20,363	100.0	

1992 Illinois House of Representatives election
Party	Candidate	Votes	%	±%
Democratic	Eugene Moore	28,265	74.97	−1.52%
Republican	Lorenzo S. Littles	5,767	15.30	−8.21%
Harold Washington	Loretta A. Ragsdell	3,670	9.73	N/A
Total votes		37,702	100.0	

=== 1990 – 1982 ===
1990 Illinois House of Representatives election
Party	Candidate	Votes	%	±%
Democratic	John J. Cullerton (incumbent)	16,018	76.49	+3.61%
Republican	Robert N. Oberg	4,923	23.51	−3.61%
Total votes		20,941	100.0	

1988 Illinois House of Representatives election
Party	Candidate	Votes	%	±%
Democratic	John J. Cullerton (incumbent)	25,545	72.88	−3.36%
Republican	Cornelius J. Tanis	9,503	27.12	+3.36%
Total votes		35,048	100.0	

1986 Illinois House of Representatives election
Party	Candidate	Votes	%	±%
Democratic	John J. Cullerton (incumbent)	16,654	76.24	+11.01%
Republican	Cornelius J. Tanis	5,189	23.76	−5.98%
Total votes		21,843	100.0	

1984 Illinois House of Representatives election
Party	Candidate	Votes	%	±%
Democratic	John J. Cullerton (incumbent)	22,848	65.23	−22.92%
Republican	Steven Baer	10,416	29.74	N/A
Citizens	Paul R. Baker	1,763	5.03	−4.74%
Total votes		35,027	100.0	

1982 Illinois House of Representatives election
Party	Candidate	Votes	%
Democratic	John J. Cullerton (incumbent)	22,463	88.15
Citizens	Bruce D. Kaplan	2,489	9.77
Communist	Richard L. Giovanoni	530	2.08
Total votes		25,482	100.0

=== 1970 – 1962 ===
1970 Illinois House of Representatives election
Party	Candidate	Votes	%
Republican	Joseph G. Sevcik (incumbent)	70,029	32.59
Republican	Henry J. Klosak (incumbent)	59,760	27.81
Democratic	Gerald W. Shea (incumbent)	53,204.5	24.76
Democratic	Stanley F. Rocush	31,903	14.85
Write-in		2	0.00
Total votes		214,898.5	100.0

1968 Illinois House of Representatives election
Party	Candidate	Votes	%
Republican	Henry J. Klosak (incumbent)	87,690	32.84
Republican	Joseph G. Sevcik (incumbent)	85,102	31.87
Democratic	Gerald W. Shea (incumbent)	56,537.5	21.17
Democratic	Frank S. Belmonte	37,682	14.11
Total votes		267,011.5	100.0

1966 Illinois House of Representatives election
Party	Candidate	Votes	%
Republican	Joseph G. Sevcik	83,135	35.45
Republican	Henry J. Klosak	75,902	32.36
Democratic	Gerald W. Shea	40,090.5	17.09
Democratic	Frank J. Baley	35,415	15.10
Total votes		234,542.5	100.0

1962 Illinois House of Representatives election
Party	Candidate	Votes	%
Republican	Frances L. Dawson (incumbent)	74,180.75	39.11
Republican	Alan R. Johnston	61,271.75	32.30
Democratic	Robert Marks (incumbent)	34,332.25	18.10
Democratic	Eugene R. Ward	19,904.25	10.49
Total votes		189,689	100.0

=== 1960 – 1956 ===
1960 Illinois House of Representatives election
Party	Candidate	Votes	%
Republican	Frances L. Dawson (incumbent)	86,025	37.54
Republican	Marion E. Burks (incumbent)	72,480	31.63
Democratic	Robert Marks	38,469.75	16.79
Democratic	Ada Quiat Meyers	32,164.25	14.04
Total votes		229,139	100.0

1958 Illinois House of Representatives election
Party	Candidate	Votes	%
Republican	Frances L. Dawson (incumbent)	64,649.5	40.82
Republican	Marion E. Burks (incumbent)	48,234	30.46
Democratic	Jeanne C. Hurley (incumbent)	30,097.5	19.00
Democratic	Esther E. Jennings	15,392	9.72
Total votes		158,373	100.0

1956 Illinois House of Representatives election
Party	Candidate	Votes	%
Republican	Frances L. Dawson	83,235	40.01
Republican	Marion E. Burks	71,681.5	34.46
Democratic	Jeanne C. Hurley	27,372	13.16
Democratic	Russell Packard	25,733	12.37
Total votes		208,021.5	100.0
