= Earl D. Eisenhower =

American electrical engineer and politician (1898–1968)

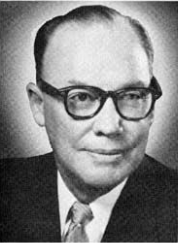
- Portrait of Earl D. Eisenhower from the 1965–1966 Illinois Blue Book

Member of the Illinois House of Representatives from the at-large district
- In office January 13, 1965 – January 11, 1967
- Preceded by: District created
- Succeeded by: District abolished

Personal details
- Born: Earl Dewey Eisenhower; February 1, 1898 Abilene, Kansas, U.S.
- Died: December 18, 1968 (aged 70) Scottsdale, Arizona, U.S.
- Party: Republican
- Spouse: Kathryn McIntyre Snyder (m. 1933)
- Children: 2
- Education: University of Washington (BS)

Earl Dewey Eisenhower (February 1, 1898 – December 18, 1968) was an American electrical engineer and legislator, as well as the younger brother of U.S. President Dwight D. Eisenhower.

== Early life and education ==
Born in Abilene, Kansas, his brothers included President Dwight D. Eisenhower, attorney Edgar N. Eisenhower, and university president Milton Eisenhower. Eisenhower moved to the state of Washington, where he stayed with his brother Edgar who helped with college expenses. Earl Eisenhower graduated from the University of Washington in 1923 with a degree in electrical engineering. After working on a passenger ship, he worked in Pennsylvania with West Penn Power Company and in Illinois with Suburban Life Newspapers.

== Career ==
The 1960 reapportionment process was stalled in the Illinois General Assembly by partisan gridlock. Subsequently, the Illinois Supreme Court ordered that the 1964 Illinois House of Representatives election be held at-large. Voters were given ballots three feet long and voted for up to 177 candidates. The Republicans found Earl Eisenhower, a La Grange Park resident, to head their ticket of 118 candidates. Though the election was won overwhelmingly by the Democratic Party, Eisenhower himself was elected to the Illinois House of Representatives. Eisenhower was assigned to the Committees on Agriculture; Motor Vehicles and Traffic Regulation; and Public Utilities, Railroads and Aviation. He also served on the American Heritage Commission.

After a 1965 Illinois Supreme Court order resolved the redistricting issue, Eisenhower's home at 404 Homestead Road was drawn into the 7th district. In 1965, out of frustration of being in the minority party and a general desire to retire, Eisenhower announced he would not run for a second term in the Illinois House of Representatives. However, he developed an interest in running for Cook County Treasurer or Cook County Clerk and asked the Cook County Republican Party to slate him for one of the positions. He then ran for County Clerk of Cook County, Illinois and lost in the 1966 election. The multi-member 7th district elected Republican candidates Joseph G. Sevcik of Berwyn and Henry Klosak of Cicero, and Democratic candidate Gerald W. Shea of Riverside.

== Personal life ==
He died December 18, 1968, in Scottsdale, Arizona, 3 months before his brother Dwight.
