= Chris Welch (politician) =

American politician (born 1971)

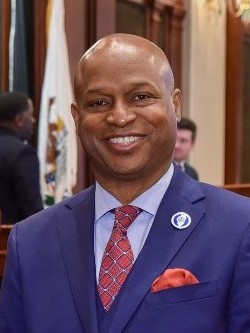
- Welch in 2023.

70th Speaker of the Illinois House of Representatives
- Incumbent
- Assumed office January 13, 2021
- Preceded by: Mike Madigan

Member of the Illinois House of Representatives from the 7th district
- Incumbent
- Assumed office January 11, 2013
- Preceded by: Cory Foster

Personal details
- Born: Emanuel Christopher Welch; February 6, 1971 (age 55)
- Party: Democratic
- Spouse: ShawnTe Raines
- Children: 2
- Education: Northwestern University (BA); John Marshall Law School (JD)

Emanuel Christopher Welch (born February 6, 1971), known as Chris Welch, is an American lawyer and politician who is the Speaker of the Illinois House of Representatives. A Democrat, he represents the 7th district in Cook County, which includes all or parts of River Forest, Forest Park, Maywood, Broadview, Bellwood, Hillside, Westchester, La Grange Park, and Berkeley.

Welch was elected the 70th Speaker of the Illinois House of Representatives on January 13, 2021, succeeding longtime Speaker Michael Madigan. He is the first African American to serve in this position.

== Education and law career ==
Welch graduated from Proviso West High School in Hillside, Illinois, in 1989. He attended Northwestern University, graduating with a B.A. degree in 1993, and the John Marshall Law School, graduating with a J.D. degree in 1997.

A member of the Illinois bar in private practice, Welch is a partner at Ancel Glink. Before Ancel Glink, he was a partner at Sanchez, Daniels and Hoffman, LLP.

== Proviso Township High School Board of Education ==
In 2001, Welch was elected to the Proviso Township High School District 209 Board of Education, and later served at the Board's president. Welch led the district's efforts to establish the nationally recognized Proviso Math and Science Academy. He stepped down from the Board in 2013, upon his election to the House.

In 2008, the Proviso School Board's former law firm, Odelson & Sterk, which it fired in 2007, sued Welch for allegedly making defamatory comments about the firm on the blog "Proviso Insider", to which Welch was an anonymous contributor. The district covered his legal expenses, but questions were raised about whether the firm was targeting Welch for actions taken in his personal capacity, with Board member Theresa Kelly filing a complaint with the regional superintendent of schools about the matter. In 2011, Welch sought to have the district pay a $400,000 settlement he reached with the firm, but the District's Financial Oversight Panel blocked this. In July 2012, Welch agreed to pay the firm an unknown amount.

== Illinois House of Representatives ==
=== Elections ===
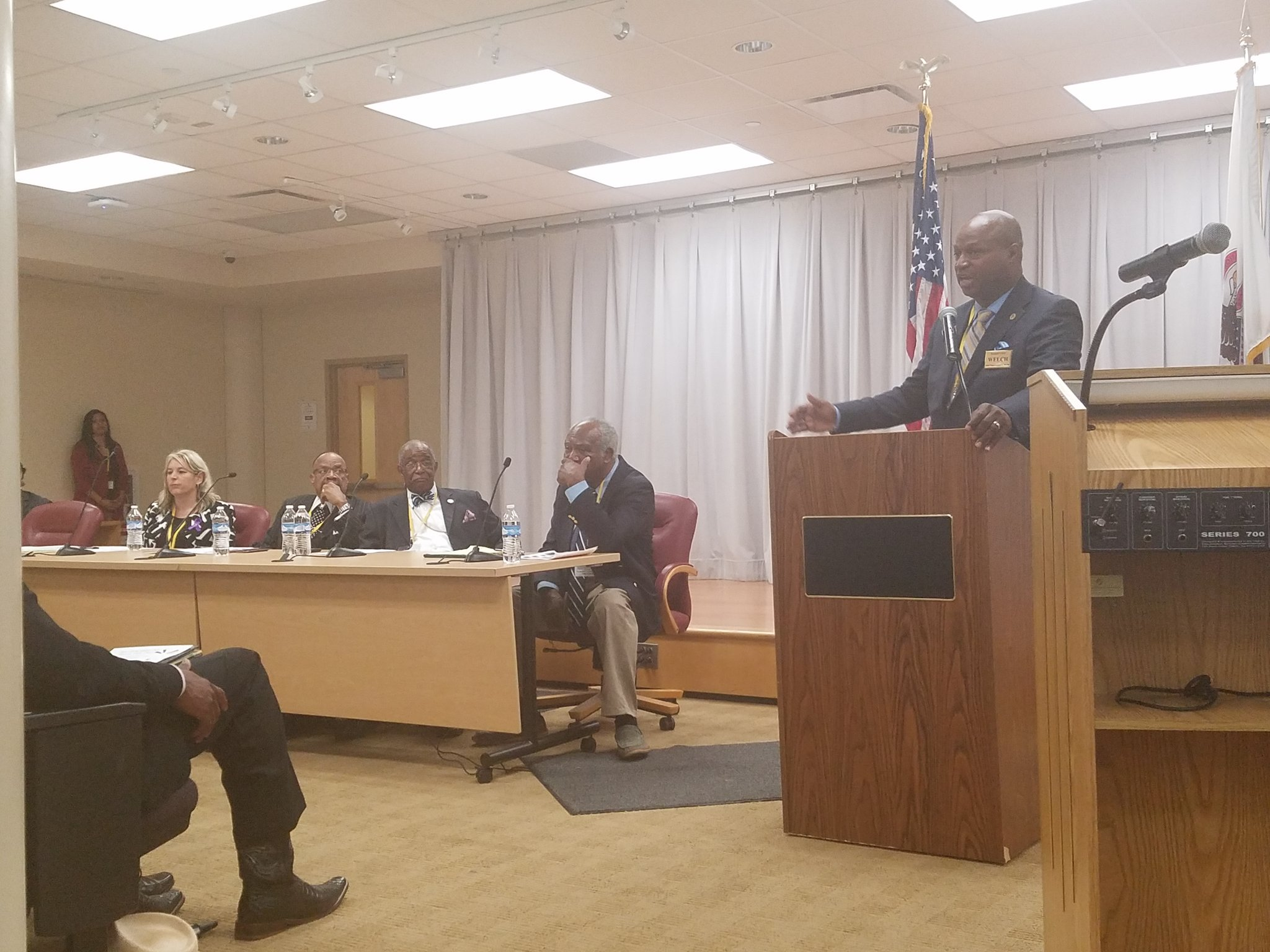
Welch speaking at a drug policy conference in 2016.

Welch first ran for the Illinois House of Representatives in district 7 in 2006, challenging incumbent Democrat Karen Yarbrough. Welch focused his campaign on education. He lost the primary to Yarbrough.

In 2012, Welch again sought the Democratic nomination for the legislative seat, and he narrowly defeated three other candidates including his former girlfriend in the primary and ran unopposed in the general election. He was sworn in on January 9, 2013.

Welch's 2014 Democratic primary challenger, Antoinette Gray, was removed from the ballot for failing to meet the residency requirements for the position, leaving Welch unopposed in the primary. He also ran unopposed in that year's general election for the seat.

In 2016, Welch sought a third term in the House, defeated Democratic primary challenger Chris Harris, and was unopposed in the general election. He was reelected in 2018 and 2020 without a challenger.

Welch was reelected in 2022 against Republican challenger Eddie Kornegay with 77% of the vote.

=== Tenure ===
In 2018, then Governor-elect J. B. Pritzker appointed Welch to the Educational Success transition committee, which is responsible for state education policy.

Welch led a special House committee investigating the ComEd Bribery scandal, which then-House Speaker Michael Madigan, of whom Welch was a top ally, was later charged in. The committee's work ended abruptly without any findings. Welch later said that he felt the matter needed to be handled by prosecutors.

Welch also chaired the House Executive Committee. In the 2020 U.S. presidential election, he served as a presidential elector on behalf of Joe Biden, replacing former U.S. Representative Jerry Costello.

==== Misconduct allegations ====
In March 2012, when Welch was running for state representative, a Chicago Sun-Times report detailed instances of alleged nepotism and misconduct Welch allegedly engaged in on the Board. Per the report, the District fired two women when their personal relationships with Welch ended, including a woman who claimed she was fired from her post as an assistant to the superintendent after breaking up with him. The woman filed a lawsuit about the matter, which was eventually settled.

The other woman, Beyonca Johnson, said Welch sexually harassed her after their breakup and told her "she could kiss her job goodbye." She filed a restraining order and a federal lawsuit against Welch, both of which were later dismissed. She went on to run against Welch in the 2012 Democratic primary for the state House seat Welch won, losing to Welch.

The district hired both Welch's brother and the best man at his wedding during Welch's tenure. In total, he allegedly hired 19 close friends and relatives to positions in the district.

While running for state representative in 2006, Welch was criticized for several campaign donations he received from district contractors he helped hire.

== House speaker ==
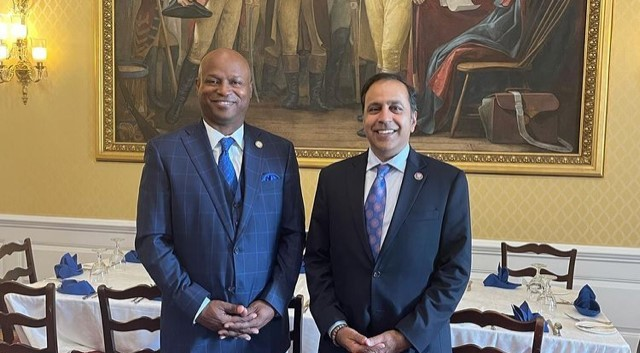
Welch with U.S. Representative Raja Krishnamoorthi in 2021.

=== Election ===
On January 13, 2021, the Illinois House of Representatives elected Welch speaker. He is the first African American to serve as Speaker of the Illinois House.

=== First term (2021–2023) ===
In Welch's first term as House Speaker, the General Assembly passed an assault weapons ban, the Climate and Equitable Jobs Act, the Safe-T Act, and new district maps to reflect the 2020 census data.

In the 2022 elections, Democrats expanded their supermajority in the House to 78 seats. Welch said that the Supreme Court's decision in Dobbs eliminating nationwide protection for abortion was a major factor in House Democrats' electoral success.

According to the Chicago Tribune, Welch has "received mostly good reviews" from his caucus as speaker for "diversity in assigning tasks to and bringing in more people in bill negotiations."

=== Second term (2023–) ===
The House reelected Welch speaker on January 11, 2023.

Two days later, he announced Robyn Gabel would be Majority Leader, replacing Greg Harris, who retired.

Welch supported a bill that bans assault weapons in 2023.

In July 2026, after Representative Harry Benton resigned following an ethics investigation which found he had engaged in a "pattern and practice of inappropriate sexual conduct" dating back to 2023, it came to light that Welch had known about sexual harassment allegations against Benton as early as April 2023. Despite this, Welch had spent $1.4 million for Benton's reelection campaign in 2024. Shortly after the report from the ethics investigation was delivered to him, Welch called on Benton to resign. However Welch has faced scrutiny, including calls for his own resignation, over his handling of the complaints and his failure to act sooner.

== Personal life ==
Welch grew up with two brothers and three cousins, the children of his aunt who was murdered in Chicago. He has said that during his childhood, his mother worked as a nurse and his father was a union factory worker who worked two jobs a day.

Welch is married to attorney ShawnTe Raines-Welch and has two children. She spent a decade working as a municipal attorney in several south suburban communities. In 2022, she won the Democratic nomination to be a Cook County judge.

Welch lives in Hillside, Illinois.

== Electoral history ==
Illinois 7th Representative District Democratic Primary, 2012
Party	Candidate	Votes	%
Democratic	Emanuel "Chris" Welch	4,670	39.10
Democratic	Rory Hoskins	4,634	38.79
Democratic	Beyonca Johnson	1,634	13.68
Democratic	Princess C. Dempsey	1,007	8.43
Total votes		11,945	100.0

Illinois 7th Representative District General Election, 2012
Party	Candidate	Votes	%
Democratic	Emanuel "Chris" Welch	35,505	100.0
Total votes		35,505	100.0

Illinois 7th Representative District General Election, 2014
Party	Candidate	Votes	%
Democratic	Emanuel "Chris" Welch (incumbent)	26,839	100.0
Total votes		26,839	100.0

Illinois 7th Representative District Democratic Primary, 2016
Party	Candidate	Votes	%
Democratic	Emanuel "Chris" Welch (incumbent)	18,117	65.55
Democratic	Chris Harris	9,521	34.45
Total votes		27,638	100.0

Illinois 7th Representative District General Election, 2016
Party	Candidate	Votes	%
Democratic	Emanuel "Chris" Welch (incumbent)	39,914	100.0
Total votes		39,914	100.0

Illinois 7th Representative District General Election, 2018
Party	Candidate	Votes	%
Democratic	Emanuel "Chris" Welch (incumbent)	35,678	100.0
Total votes		35,678	100.0

Illinois 7th Representative District General Election, 2020
Party	Candidate	Votes	%
Democratic	Emanuel "Chris" Welch (incumbent)	43,883	100.0
Total votes		43,883	100.0

Illinois 7th Representative District General Election, 2022
Party	Candidate	Votes	%
Democratic	Emanuel "Chris" Welch (incumbent)	24,725	77.6
Republican	Eddie Kornegay	7,128	22.4
Total votes		31,853	100.0

Political offices
Preceded by Mike Madigan	Speaker of the Illinois House of Representatives; 2021–present	Incumbent
