= Marion E. Burks =

American politician, judge, and lawyer

Marion E. Burks (November 18, 1912 – November 29, 1989) was an American politician, judge, and lawyer.

Born in Eldorado, Illinois, Burks graduated from Eldorado Township High School in 1931. Burks received his bachelor's degree from Murray State University, in 1935, and his master's degree in education from University of Illinois, in 1940. He taught school in Eldorado, Illinois and then he received his law degree from Lincoln College of Law in Springfield, Illinois, in 1945. He practiced law in Evanston, Illinois. He also served as assistant director of the Illinois Department of Insurance and was chairman of the Central Casualty Company. He served in the Illinois House of Representatives from 1957 to 1963 and was a Republican. In 1962, Burks ran for the Republican nomination for the United States House of Representatives. However, he lost the primary to Donald Rumsfeld. Burks served as Illinois Circuit Court judge for Cook County, Illinois from 1976 to 1984. Burks died at an extended care facility in Sun City, Arizona.

== Notes ==
Illinois House of Representatives
Preceded by Bernice T. Van der Vries; Arthur W. Sprague; Joseph J. Lelivelt	Member of the Illinois House of Representatives from the 7th district 1957–1963; Served alongside: Frances L. Dawson, Jeanne Hurley Simon, Robert Marks	Succeeded by Alan R. Johnston
