= Ida Stover Eisenhower =

American pacifist (1862–1946)

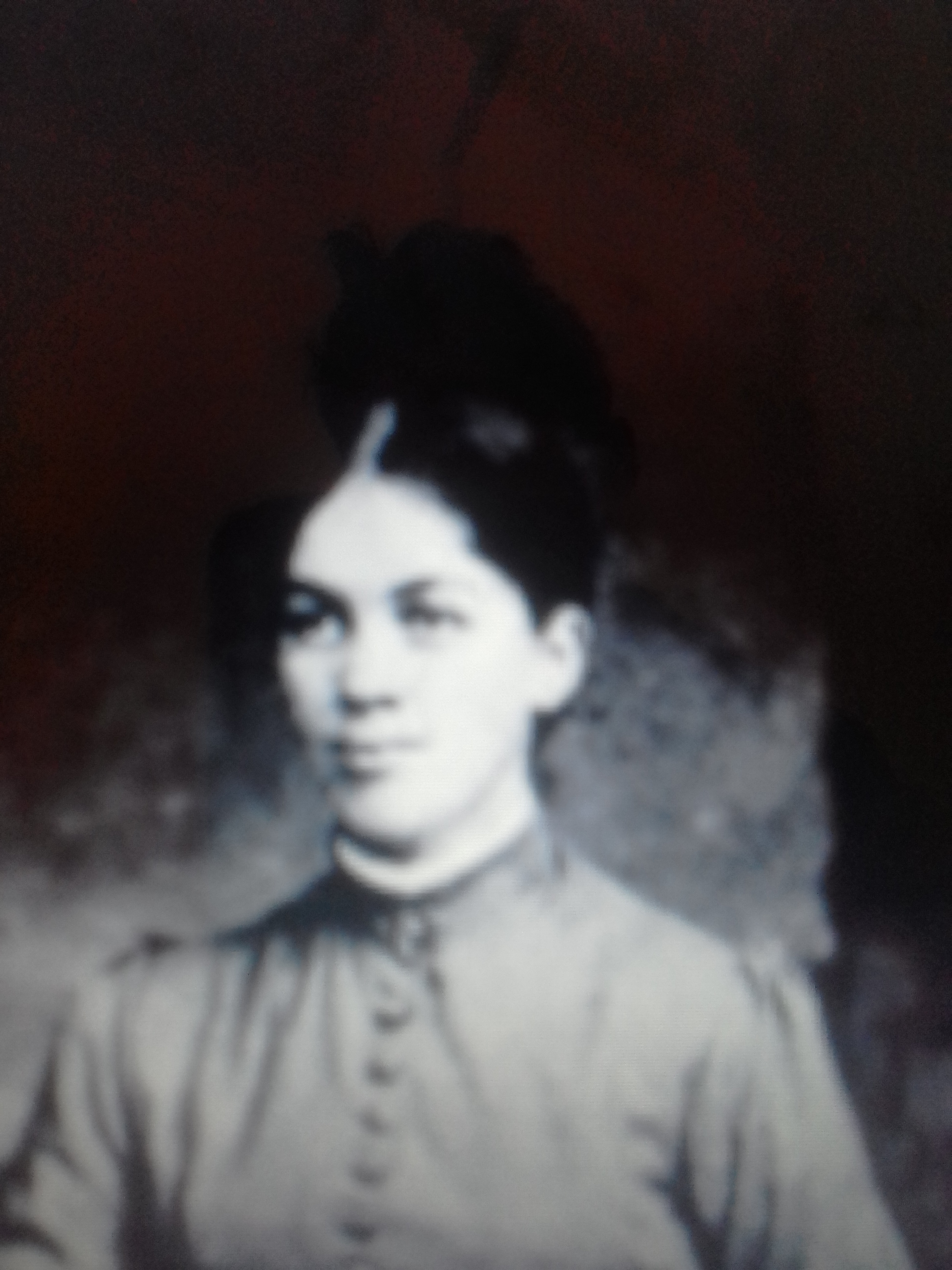
- Eisenhower in the 1880s
- Born: Ida Elizabeth Stover; May 1, 1862; Mount Sidney, Virginia, U.S.
- Died: September 11, 1946 (aged 84); Abilene, Kansas, U.S.
- Resting place: Abilene Cemetery (Kansas)
- Spouse: David Jacob Eisenhower (m. 1885; died 1942)
- Children: 7, including Edgar, Dwight, Earl, and Milton

Ida Elizabeth Stover Eisenhower (May 1, 1862 – September 11, 1946) was the mother of U.S. president Dwight D. Eisenhower (1890–1969), university president Milton S. Eisenhower (1899–1985), Edgar N. Eisenhower (1889–1971), and Earl D. Eisenhower (1898–1968).

== Early life ==
She was born in Mount Sidney, Virginia, the only daughter of Elizabeth Ida Judah Link (1822–1867) and Simon P. Stover (1822–1873). She was christened "Elizabeth Ida" in the Salem Lutheran Church, Mount Sidney, Virginia (currently the Salem Evangelical Lutheran Church), whose baptismal records show an original name of "Elizabeth Juda".

The 1870 census shows identifies her as living with her father, stepmother(?), and brothers. In the 1880 census she is included as a niece in a Houff household.

She was five years old when her mother died, after which she lived with her maternal grandparents, William Link and Esther Black Link, until William's death in 1879. She next lived with her maternal uncle and aunt, William J. Link and Susan Cook Link, who raised her at their farm. They did not believe girls should be educated in secular matters, and instead pushed her to memorize the Bible. When told she could not enroll in high school, she ran away. Stover graduated from high school at age 19.

At age 21, she joined two of her brothers who had moved to Kansas, and taught for two years before entering Lane University in Lecompton, Kansas. While on campus, she met her future husband, David Jacob Eisenhower, on September 23, 1885. He was a college-educated engineer but had trouble making a living and the family was always poor.

== Adulthood ==
In the 1890s, Eisenhower left the River Brethren Christian group, and joined the International Bible Students, which would evolve into what is now known as Jehovah's Witnesses. The Eisenhower home served as the local meeting hall for the Bible Students from 1896 to 1915 but her sons, although raised there, never joined the movement.

She had seven sons:

- Arthur Bradford Eisenhower (1886–1958)
- Edgar Newton Eisenhower (1889–1971)
- Dwight David Eisenhower (1890–1969), 34th president of the United States.
- Roy Jacob Eisenhower (1892–1942)
- Paul Dawson Eisenhower (1894–1895); died in infancy.
- Earl Dewey Eisenhower (1898–1968)
- Milton Stover Eisenhower (1899–1985), university president.

Two of her children remained in Kansas, while the rest entered trades or professions that took them to other states.

Eisenhower was a lifelong pacifist, so Dwight's decision to attend West Point saddened her. She felt that warfare was "rather wicked," but she did not overrule him.

In 1942, her husband David died, after a lingering illness. Within a few months thereafter, her middle son Roy, the only one still living in the same city, died suddenly at the age of 49. The surviving sons then paid Eisenhower's longtime friend Naomi Engle to move in with Eisenhower, as a caretaker and companion. Dwight Eisenhower, then fully engaged in the management of World War II, was unable to attend his father's funeral, or to see his mother at all until 1944. In 1945, Eisenhower was named Kansas Mother of the Year.

Dwight Eisenhower said of her:

Many such persons of her faith, selflessness, and boundless consideration of others have been called saintly. She was that—but above all she was a worker, an administrator, a teacher and guide, a truly wonderful woman.
