= Venedy =

Venedy is a village and a township in Washington County, Illinois, in the United States:

- Venedy, Illinois
- Venedy Township, Illinois
