= Mike Madigan =

American politician (born 1942)

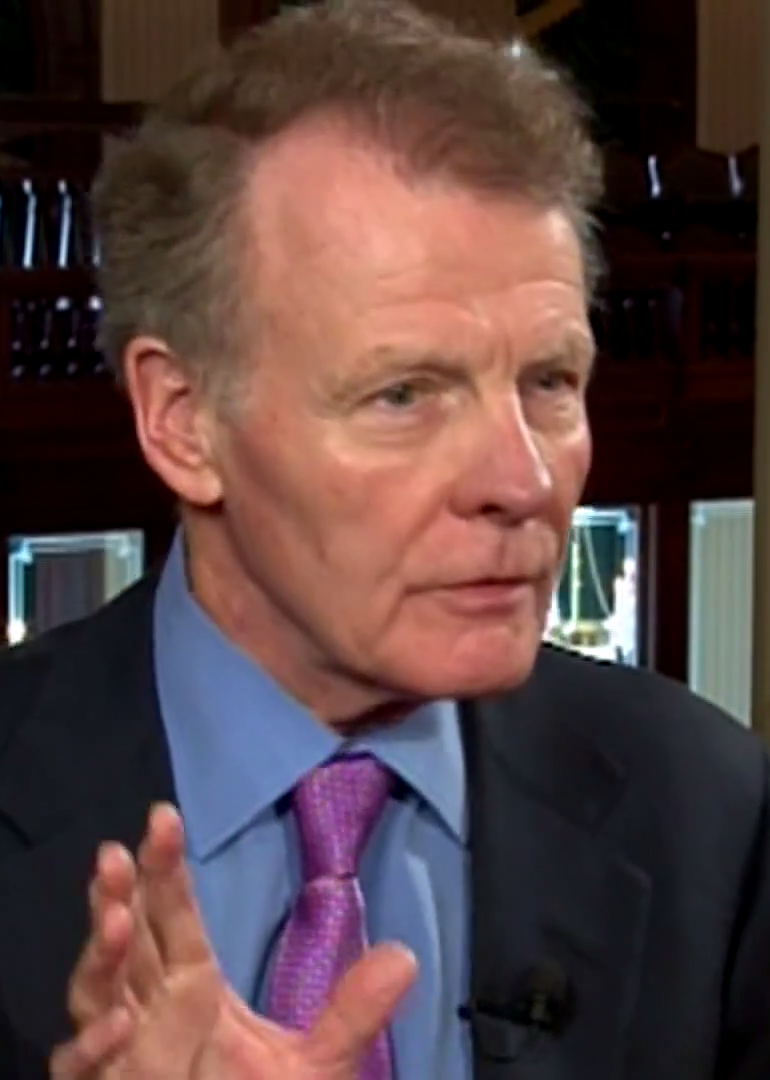
- Madigan in 2013

Chair of the Democratic Party of Illinois
- In office April 3, 1998 – February 22, 2021
- Preceded by: Gary LaPaille
- Succeeded by: Karen Yarbrough (acting)

67th & 69th Speaker of the Illinois House of Representatives
- In office January 8, 1997 – January 13, 2021
- Preceded by: Lee Daniels
- Succeeded by: Chris Welch
- In office January 12, 1983 – January 11, 1995
- Preceded by: Arthur Telcser
- Succeeded by: Lee Daniels

Minority Leader of the Illinois House of Representatives
- In office January 11, 1995 – January 8, 1997
- Preceded by: Lee A. Daniels
- Succeeded by: Lee A. Daniels
- In office January 14, 1981 – January 12, 1983
- Preceded by: George Ryan
- Succeeded by: Lee A. Daniels

Majority Leader of the Illinois House of Representatives
- In office January 12, 1977 – January 14, 1981
- Preceded by: Gerald W. Shea
- Succeeded by: Arthur Telcser

Member of the Illinois House of Representatives
- In office January 13, 1971 – February 18, 2021
- Preceded by: Frank Savickas
- Succeeded by: Edward Guerra Kodatt
- Constituency: 27th district (1971–1983); 30th district (1983–1993); 22nd district (1993–2021)

Personal details
- Born: Michael Joseph Madigan; April 19, 1942 (age 84) Chicago, Illinois, U.S.
- Party: Democratic
- Spouse: Shirley Murie
- Children: 4, including Lisa (adopted)
- Education: University of Notre Dame (BA); Loyola University Chicago (JD)
- Criminal information
- Convictions: Conspiracy (Note: Conspiracy to commit an offense against the United States); Bribery (2 counts); Wire fraud (3 counts); Violation of the Travel Act (4 counts)
- Penalty: 7½ years in prison; $2.5 million fine

Details
- Date apprehended: March 2, 2022
- Imprisoned at: Federal Prison Camp, Morgantown

Michael Joseph Madigan (born April 19, 1942) is an American politician who was the Speaker of the Illinois House of Representatives. A member of the Democratic Party, he was the longest-serving leader of any legislative body, state or federal, in the history of the United States. From 1983 until 2021, he held the position for all but two years. Considered the state's political boss, Madigan was the most powerful figure in the Democratic Party of Illinois until his resignation from office in 2021. He was later convicted of bribery, wire fraud, and other criminal offenses arising from his time in office.

Madigan began his career working within Chicago mayor Richard J. Daley's administration. First elected to the Illinois House of Representatives in 1970, he was reelected nine times and represented a portion of the city's South Side. At the time of his resignation, Madigan was the Illinois House's longest-serving member and the last legislator elected before the 1980 Cutback Amendment. He was also the chair of the state Democratic party for over 22 years, from 1998 until 2021.

Called "one of the most powerful men in Illinois history," Speaker Madigan controlled all redistricting in the state for several decades and ran an extensive patronage network that spanned state and local bodies. Due to his clout in state politics, Madigan was nicknamed "The Velvet Hammer" and "The Real Governor of Illinois." Rich Miller, editor of Capitol Fax, noted that "the pile of political corpses outside Madigan's Statehouse door of those who tried to beat him one way or another is a mile high and a mile wide." In a blow to his dominance, Madigan was denied an eleventh consecutive term as speaker by his fellow Democrats following the 2020 election. A month later, in February 2021, he resigned as a state representative and as party chair.

On March 2, 2022, Madigan was indicted on federal racketeering charges, with prosecutors alleging that Madigan led a criminal enterprise that sought to enhance his political power and enrich him and his allies. On February 12, 2025, Madigan was convicted on ten counts of bribery, wire fraud, and Travel Act violations. He was sentenced to 7½ years in prison and a $2.5 million fine. He began serving his sentence at a West Virginia federal prison on October 13, 2025.

== Early life and career ==
Madigan's father, Michael, was "a very strong Democrat, he was a product of the Depression ... He carried with him very strong feelings in favor of many of the enactments of the New Deal." Michael J. Flynn was the Cook County Clerk, and also the Democratic committeeman of Chicago's 13th Ward, an unpaid, political-party leadership position. Madigan's father was a precinct captain in the 13th Ward and worked in the Cook County Clerk's office, where he befriended a young Richard J. Daley, who would later succeed Flynn as County Clerk prior to running for mayor of Chicago. Madigan later characterized the relationship between his father and Richard J. Daley as "political friends." The elder Michael Madigan later worked for 25 years as the 23rd Ward superintendent for the City of Chicago Department of Streets and Sanitation. Despite their relationship, there was at times also hostility between the Madigan and Daley families as well, as each family sought to prove political dominance over the other.

Madigan was born on April 19, 1942, and was raised in the Clearing neighborhood of Chicago. Madigan graduated from Saint Adrian's Elementary School, St. Ignatius College Prep on the west side of Chicago, and the University of Notre Dame. Madigan's father suffered a heart attack at age 58, and a fatal heart attack at age 60, in 1966. Madigan graduated from Loyola Law School in 1967.

== Career ==
=== 1960s ===
In 1965, while a first-year law student at Loyola University Chicago School of Law, Madigan bought a membership in the Lake Shore Club and introduced himself to Chicago Mayor Richard J. Daley as Michael Madigan's son. Within months, at Madigan's father's request, Mayor Daley appointed Madigan to a summer job with the city law department between his first and second years of law school. Madigan also met Daley's son, Richard M. Daley, while both were law students.

In 1969 the 13th Ward precinct captains elected Madigan their committeeman, making him, at age 27, the youngest ward committeeman in Chicago at the time.

=== 1970s ===
Madigan and Richard M. Daley were both delegates to the 1969-70 Illinois Constitutional convention (which wrote the current Constitution of Illinois, adopted after Illinois voters approved it in the 1970 special election), and became good friends. Nevertheless, hostility could still exist between the two over political aspirations, with former Chicago operative Don Rose noting in 2013 that while there was no seriously bad blood between Madigan and Richard M. Daley, “there were jealousies and let’s say significant disrespect.”

In November 1970, Madigan was elected to represent the 22nd District in the Illinois House of Representatives. The district was on Chicago's southwest side in the area surrounding Midway International Airport. With Republicans in control of the chamber, becomes minority leader in 1977, marking the start of 44 years leading the Democratic Party in the Illinois House of Representatives. In 1972, Madigan founded the private law firm of Madigan and Getzendanner with Vincent J. "Bud" Getzendanner Jr., a fellow Loyola law graduate, one year his senior.

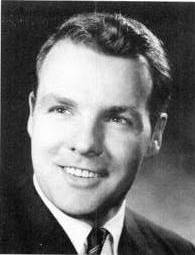
Madigan, circa 1977

=== 1980s ===
==== Rise to Power ====
Following the 1980 census, Madigan played a central role in the state's legislative redistricting. With the state house controlled by the Republicans and the state senate controlled by the Democrats, the redistricting process was deadlocked. The Democrats won the tie breaker, with a Democrat name being pulled out of a hat. This gave Madigan, then the minority leader, control over redistricting. Madigan's gerrymandered 1981 map concentrated legislative seats in Democratic-majority Chicago and dilluted suburban Republican votes, allowing Democrats to flip the chamber in 1982 and Madigan to ascend to the speakership for the first time. Following 1981, Madigan remained the chief mapmaker of the legislative districts of the Illinois General Assembly and the United States Congress in Illinois and during reapportionment he continued to design the Illinois House districts to increase his majority.

Madigan joined Chicago Mayor Jane Byrne in endorsing Alderman Edward M. Burke in the 1980 Democratic primary race for Cook County State's Attorney, over Madigan's on and off friend Richard M. Daley. Madigan would also back Byrne over Daley in the 1983 Chicago mayoral election.

On January 12, 1983, Madigan was unanimously elected by his Democratic colleagues as Speaker of the Illinois House of Representatives. In one of his first acts as speaker, Madigan, despite being initially opposed to the idea, backed a proposal to create the Illinois Freedom of Information Act, which opened state records to the public.

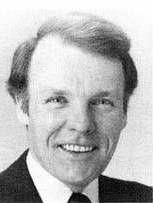
Madigan, circa 1985

During the 1986 Illinois Democratic primary for governor, Madigan used his expanding influence to force his longtime intraparty rival, Attorney General Neil Hartigan, out of the race. By the fall of 1985, Hartigan was seen as the frontrunner for the Democratic nomination. To counter Hartigan's candidacy, Madigan recruited former U.S. Senator and 1982 nominee Adlai Stevenson III to enter the race. With Stevenson's entry creating a contentious path to the nomination, Hartigan withdrew from the primary to run for reelection as attorney general. Stevenson subsequently won the Democratic nomination, but lost the general election to incumbent Governor Jim Thompson.

==== 1988 Chicago White Sox deal ====
In 1988, the Chicago White Sox were threatening to move the club to St. Petersburg, Florida's newly built Suncoast Dome. Madigan and Governor Thompson worked together to approve than $200 million dollars in funding for a new stadium for the team in Chicago. Legislators ultimately approved a last-minute deal to build a new stadium on June 30, 1988, and new Comiskey Park opened in 1991. However, Madigan and Thompson struggled to find the votes until right before a midnight deadline, causing some to allege that Madigan had the clocks in the Illinois State Capitol stopped a few minutes before midnight until they had the necessary votes to pass the funding.

==== Operation Cobra ====
During the late 1980s, Governor Thompson sought to implement an tax surcharge to increase funding for public schools. However, Madigan repeatedly blocked Thompson's efforts, positioning himself and the Democratic Party as anti-tax fiscal watchdogs. Madigan's stance suddenly shifted in May of 1989, when in a secret manuever called "Operation Cobra," Madigan pushed the income tax hike through the state legislature in a matter of hours, using only Democratic votes. Thompson called the plan "bold... audacious. And it might even be diabolical." According to The Chicago Tribune, the plan reportedly came to secretly save newly elected Chicago Mayor Richard M. Daley, who was facing a massive budget deficit, from implementing a politically costly local tax hike. Irritated by the criticism he was receiving from the conservative-leaning editoral board of The Chicago Tribune, he secretly leaked Operation Cobra to the media in advance, but purposefully excluded The Chicago Tribune.

=== 1990s ===
Newly elected Governor Jim Edgar's first proposed budget for the fiscal year 1992 included no tax increases and extensive cuts to state spending totaling in the millions of dollars—with the exception of education, which received a slight increase. This budget ran into conflict with the Democrat-controlled Illinois General Assembly and a months-long budget fight ensued between Edgar and Madigan over his proposals. After months of negotiations, the two reached a compromise in mid-July that included most of Edgar's initial spending cuts, made permanent the temporary income tax surcharge that had dominated the 1990 campaign, and established property tax caps in all counties except Cook.

Additionally, a bipartisan compromise bill between Madigan and Edgar address the state's developing pension crisis was passed in 1994.

==== 1994 and 1996 elections ====
Madigan lost the speakership for the only time in 1994, when Republicans took control of the Illinois House and Lee Daniels of Elmhurst became Speaker. The following election cycle in 1996, Madigan recruited candidates who appealed to south suburban Chicago voters and the Illinois House Democratic Majority political action committee he controlled spent $272,000 in six south suburban races. Democrats won back nine seats in the Illinois House in the elections that year, regained a majority, and Madigan resumed the Speaker's role and held it until January 2021, becoming the longest-serving state House speaker in United States history.

==== Chairman of the Democratic Party of Illinois ====
In 1998, the Illinois Democratic Party's Central Committee elected Madigan chair of the Democratic Party of Illinois. Madigan succeeded his protégé and former chief of staff, Gary LaPaille. Madigan fired the state party staff, closed its headquarters in the Merchandise Mart in Chicago, and moved it to Springfield, Illinois, to the same office building as his campaign finance committee staff. Madigan begins to utilize this post to influence Democratic campaigns and reward loyalists.

=== 2000s ===
After 2002 – when Democrats took control of all branches of the state government – Madigan feuded with leading Democrats Governor Rod Blagojevich and Senate President Emil Jones. Both accuse Madigan of being too conservative, with Blagojevich calling Madigan a "George Bush Republican" in a press release.

==== Relationship with Blagojevich ====
Madigan and Blagojevich clashed over Blagojevich's proposals for increased state spending. Blagojevich blamed the 2007 budget crisis on Madigan and Madigan refused to meet with Blagojevich for more than two months after Blagojevich introduced the budget; rather than the proposed $5 billion in increased spending, he recommended $1 billion, funded by the ending of a tax break. When talks stalled, Madigan invited the entire House to accompany him to budget negotiations.

Madigan opposed Blagojevich's proposed gross receipts tax in 2007. He said the tax was "regressive" and would hurt the poor, who are "the least able in our society to take on additional costs."

Illinois senior Senator Dick Durbin said in 2008 that he received many constituent complaints about the dispute between Blagojevich and Madigan, with letter writers wanting him to step in to negotiate. Durbin joked that he would rather go to Baghdad to mediate than Springfield.

The Chicago Sun-Times statehouse bureau reporter of 13 years, Dave McKinney, said of Madigan's style as Speaker:

It's sort of the classic case that you get a guy (Madigan) who is steeped in discipline versus a guy who's very undisciplined, like Blagojevich. You can see it in their work habits, in their mannerisms.

Madigan is very measured in what he says. You never see him flying off on things. He is so precise.

This guy has been speaker for almost 30 years. He runs that chamber almost like he runs his house. They come in on time. He knows the rules. He's written the rules.

Madigan likes news clippings given to him every day; he likes to keep up on things. And he likes them clipped and organized in a certain way. With Rod, you get the sense that he's more of a big ideas person, but then doesn't really have the wherewithal to carry through on things to make sure they get done, to deliver.

The relationship between Blagojevich and Madigan hit its low in October 2007, when Blagojevich fired Bronwyn Rains, wife of Madigan's chief of staff Timothy Mapes, from her position of psychologist with the Illinois Department of Children and Family Services. Blagojevich said he based this on Rains's educational background. She had worked for the department for 24 years with no prior record of problems; one observer called the fallout "nuclear war."

Senate Republican Leader Frank Watson and House Republican Leader Tom Cross often met with Madigan, his Senate counterpart at the time Emil Jones, and Blagojevich in an attempt to referee disputes. In August 2008, Blagojevich stated that House Democrats who held City of Chicago jobs were fearful of voting in favor of his 2008 capital bill because they thought Madigan might be able to get them fired. Blagojevich told reporters:

They fear their leader, Mr. Madigan, and if Mike Madigan tells them to vote a certain way, they will tell you privately, and I've had these discussions with a couple of state reps, one of whom said, 'I'm afraid if I vote for the jobs bill I'll be fired from my job at Streets and Sanitations [sic]. I'm afraid I'll lose my job.'

State representative Gary Hannig told the newspaper that Blagojevich had told House Democrats he was referring to John C. D'Amico. When contacted, D'Amico said that Blagojevich had asked him if he feared losing his job with the City of Chicago's water department, at which point D'Amico said that he had been in a union for 26 years and could not be fired easily, and instead opposed the capital bill because Mayor Richard M. Daley opposed it.

On December 15, 2008, Madigan announced that he was taking steps to initiate impeachment proceedings against Blagojevich after the governor was arrested on charges of conspiracy and fraud. He named Illinois House of Representatives Majority Leader Barbara Flynn Currie to chair the 21-member House committee on impeachment. After the committee reported, Madigan presided over the House deliberations which unanimously voted for the first impeachment of an Illinois governor. Subsequently, the Illinois Senate tried and removed Blagojevich from office, also by a unanimous vote.

=== 2010s ===
In early 2011 leading Illinois Democratic lawmakers and Governor Pat Quinn agreed to raise the Illinois state income tax from 3 to 5.25 percent—a 75% increase. At the time, it was estimated that this would bring in about $7.5 billion a year. The tax increase would mean that a married couple with two kids earning $80,000 a year combined would pay an extra $1,620 in taxes. Democratic leaders said the plan would pull the state out of its $15 billion budget hole. They promised the tax hike would last just four years, and then fall to 3.75 percent.

Between 2011 and 2014 the Illinois state income tax rate was 5 percent. On January 1, 2015, the tax rate was reduced from 5 percent to 3.75 percent, creating a shortfall in revenue of $2.7 billion starting FY 2015. Madigan has said that he would rather increase income taxes than sales taxes. On other occasions, he has introduced budgets that raise taxes in Illinois.

In May 2019 Madigan supported a bill to change Illinois's tax rate from a flat rate to a graduated tax rate and sponsored a bill to fine businesses for profiting from human trafficking, involuntary servitude, or sex trade activities.

==== May 2016 tax and budget plan ====
On May 25, 2016, Madigan introduced a budget plan that increased spending and "set the state on autopilot for the next year", according to the Chicago Tribune. Madigan's plan allocated $700 million more in funds to public schools. The $700 million would be doled out to poorer school districts such as Chicago Public Schools.

The Illinois Office of Management and Budget said that the tax rate for an average family in Illinois would have to go up by $1,000 to pay for Madigan's plan. That amounts to an increase of the income tax rate to 5.5 percent. Governor Bruce Rauner said that the budget was "the biggest unbalanced budget in Illinois history."

Madigan's plan passed the Illinois House of Representatives on May 25 by a vote of 63 in favor and 53 opposed. The Republican leader in the Illinois House, Jim Durkin, said the bill was "absolutely the biggest joke." Among those opposed were seven Democratic representatives. The seven were targeted for defeat in the fall 2016 campaigns.

=== 2020s ===
In January 2021, Madigan announced he would be suspending his campaign for Speaker of the Illinois House after it became apparent that he would not receive the 60 votes necessary to win. On January 13, the Illinois House voted to instead elect Chris Welch to the Speakership, making him the first African American to hold that position. A federal corruption investigation related to Madigan's conduct continued despite his ouster as speaker. Madigan resigned from the house and then, on February 22, 2021, Madigan resigned as chairman of the state Democratic Party.

In February 2025, Madigan was found guilty on ten felony counts in a corruption trial. These charges include bribery, conspiracy, and wire fraud. Following his conviction, he was sentenced to 7 1/2 years in federal prison and a $2.5 million fine.

== Allegations of corruption and criminal convictions ==
Header from a website created by the Bruce Rauner campaign in 2018 to tie JB Pritzker to Madigan

Many political observers were critical of the level of control Madigan came to hold over Illinois politics, describing him as the state's political boss. He frequently used his political power to reward allies and punish opponents, leading to allegations of corruption and criticism from Republicans that culminated in criminal convictions in 2025.

=== Madigan and Getzendaner Law Firm Allegations ===
Madigan was the founder and senior partner of the law firm Madigan and Getzendaner, specializing in corporate real estate property tax appeals, which has been accused of profiting from Madigan's position and power. Getzendaner and four other staff attorneys handle the tax appeals, while Madigan brings in clients. In 2010 Madigan and Getzendaner represented 45 of the 150 most valuable buildings in downtown Chicago, more than any other property tax appeal firm, and more than twice as many as the second-highest. Clients included the John Hancock Center and the Prudential Plaza. From 2006 to 2008 in Cook County, Illinois, Madigan and Getzendaner received the largest reductions for their clients of any tax appeal law firm. Venues for property tax appeals law firms in Cook County include hearings before the County Assessor, the County Board of Review, and the County courts. Judges in Illinois are elected in partisan elections, and Madigan, by his Democratic Party leadership roles as committeeman and state chairman, was one of the main persons involved in slating judicial candidates.

After the death of veteran 45th Ward committeeman and longtime chairman of the Cook County Democratic Party Thomas G. Lyons in January 2007, Cook County Democrats met in Chicago on February 1 to fill the vacancy. Madigan nominated Joseph Berrios, a former Illinois State Representative, then a commissioner on the Cook County Board of Review. Cook County Democrats elected Berrios their new chairman. Madigan political workers aided Berrios's 2010 campaign for Cook County Assessor. Berrios is registered as a lobbyist to Illinois state government. Berrios lobbies Madigan in Springfield, while the Assessor is critical to the lucrative commercial real-estate tax appeals practices of law firms, including Madigan's. "Even by Illinois's loose conflict of interest standards, the obviousness of the Madigan-Berrios connection is stupefying," wrote Chicago Magazine in 2013. Berrios went on to lose to Fritz Kaegi in the Democratic primary for Cook County Assessor in March 2018. Kaegi then won the general election.

=== 2009 UIUC admissions investigation ===
Governor Pat Quinn appointed a commission, led by retired Judge Abner Mikva, to investigate attempts by lawmakers, including Madigan, to influence the admission of unqualified candidates at the state's largest university. Madigan refuses to testify to the committee.

The August 6, 2009, Admissions Review Commission report stated that the university's top officials (trustees, president, chancellor) were the most culpable, because they should have refused the lawmakers' requests. However, it also said a separate commission should be established by Quinn and/or the legislature to look into possible misconduct by Madigan and others.

=== 2010s AT&T "friends and family plan" bribery scandal ===
In October 2022, under a deferred prosecution with the US Department of Justice, AT&T admitted that it arranged for payments to Illinois Representative Edward Acevedo, an ally of Madigan, in order to unlawfully influence and reward Madigan's vote in 2017 on legislation that would eliminate AT&T's so-called "Carrier of Last Resort" obligation to provide landline telephone service to all Illinois residents, which was expected to save the company millions of dollars. Madigan also helped to defeat an amendment to a bill that became law in 2018 regarding fees for small cell tower attachments that would have been harmful to AT&T's interests.

Former AT&T Illinois President Paul La Schiazza, who went on trial in September 2024 for the alleged bribery scheme, described AT&T's quid pro quo relationship with Madigan in an email to an AT&T employee as "the friends and family plan", a reference to an MCI long distance plan from the early 1990s. The first two trials of La Schiazza both ended in mistrials, with the U.S. government also considered not retrying him by October 2025. During Madigan's trial in December 2024, Acevedo, who testified as a defense witness, denied prosecution claim that he did not do work for the $22,000 which AT&T Illinois paid him.

=== 2012 financial misconduct scandal ===
In 2002 Madigan helped his daughter Lisa garner more campaign contributions in her run for Illinois Attorney General than even the candidates for governor that year. At one point, Lisa Madigan's $1.2 million raised was more than all the attorney general candidates in 1998 had raised, combined.

Allegations of misconduct in campaign contributions arose during the 2012 campaign. Madigan was accused of using taxpayer dollars for political purposes. His staffers made numerous visits at public expense to contested Illinois House districts in the winter and spring before the November 2003 election. The Republican gubernatorial candidate, Jim Ryan, suggested that Madigan should resign. Lisa Madigan was running for Attorney General that year and called the allegations baseless. Her opponent in the race called on her to pay back taxpayer-paid bonuses her father had paid staffers before they departed to work on his daughter's campaign. A federal investigation into one of Lisa Madigan's political endorsements ensued after Madigan allegedly contacted a union boss in Chicago shortly before the union endorsed Madigan's daughter for the post, but nothing came of it.

=== 2013 Metra patronage scandal ===
In the summer of 2013 it was reported that Madigan had sought to use his influence to secure patronage hiring and promotion at the Metra commuter rail agency for two of his supporters. Metra CEO Alex Clifford rejected these requests, and alleges that the agency's board sought his resignation as a result.

In the wake of this scandal five Metra board members resigned, but Madigan denied violating any ethics rules. An investigation by the Legislative Inspector General found that Madigan "should have realized, given his influential position, that by making the [personnel] requests at the conclusion of meetings with Metra officials to discuss funding and other legislative issues, he would be creating reciprocal expectations."

More than 400 current or retired state and local government employees have strong political ties to Madigan, according to a 2014 investigation by the Chicago Tribune. The former Bureau of Electricity in the Streets and Sanitation Department of the City of Chicago was called "Madigan Electric" by political insiders. Madigan recommended at least 26 individuals for jobs at Metra from 1983 to 1991.

=== 2023 conviction of former chief of staff ===
In August 2023, Madigan's former chief of staff Tim Mapes was convicted of both one count of making false declarations before a grand jury and one count of attempted obstruction of justice in a perjury case which involved some alleged protection of Madigan by Mapes. Maples was deemed to have lied under oath in order to protect Madigan from an investigation concerning an alleged ComEd bribery scheme. In February 2024, Mapes was sentenced to 30 months in prison. Mapes reported to a federal minimum security prison in Pensacola, Florida in June 2024 to begin his sentence.

=== 2025 Madigan corruption conviction ===
On February 12, 2025, Madigan was convicted on 1 of 3 federal corruption charges he was indicted with. He was convicted on one count of conspiracy, two counts of bribery, and one count of a violation of the Travel Act in conjunction with an alleged scheme involving the Illinois electricity utility Commonwealth Edison ("ComEd"), three counts of wire fraud in connection to a scheme to offer paid state positions to former Chicago Alderman Danny Solis and his daughter, and three counts accusing him of violating the Travel Act by having Solis set up meetings in efforts to try to win business for the Madigan's private law firm. Solis was acknowledged to have recorded their conversations. However, the jury would be deadlocked on six racketeering charges, including an overarching racketeering conspiracy charge, which was related to Madigan's alleged illegal dealings with lobbyist and former state representative Michael McClain; McClain was previously among four ComEd associates who were convicted in 2023 of attempting to bribe Madigan. Madigan would be found not guilty on one count of bribery related to the ComEd scheme, count of violating the Travel Act in ComEd scheme, a bribery charge which alleged he had tried to secure a state board position for Solis through the administration of Illinois Gov. J.B. Pritzker, and on a series of charges related to the Union West luxury apartment development, including multiple violations of the Travel Act and one count of attempted extortion.

As a result of his conviction, Madigan's pension payments, which he had received on a monthly basis, would be suspended due to a Illinois law which bans pensions for elected officials who receive convictions.

==== Sentencing ====
Madigan's sentencing hearing took place on March 13, 2025 in U.S. District Court in Chicago before Judge John Blakey. Prosecutors sought a 12½-year prison term, describing his conduct as "particularly egregious" and motivated by personal and political gain. His defense team requested probation, including one year of home confinement, citing his age (83), his role as primary caregiver to his wife, Shirley Madigan, and the absence of personal financial gain from the offenses.

Among the materials submitted to the court was a video message from Shirley Madigan, who said she would require outside care if her husband were imprisoned. She characterized their 50-year marriage as one of mutual dependence and emotional support, referencing The Velveteen Rabbit, a children's story about becoming "real" through enduring love. "Your fur all wears off, and you don’t look very good," she said. "But you know you are loved."

Madigan was ultimately sentenced to 7½ years in prison, having been found guilty on 10 out of 23 counts.

On October 13, 2025, Madigan began serving his prison sentence at a minimum security federal prison located in Morgantown, West Virginia.

==== Appeals effort ====
On April 27, 2026, the Chicago-based U.S. 7th Circuit Court of Appeals, the same court which had at the time recently released from prison, and ordered new trials for, two former Commonwealth Edison officials who had been previously convicted of conspiring to bribe Madigan, upheld Madigan's conviction. In a 29-page rule, the court, among other things, described the evidence against Madigan as "overwhelming." In addition, Madigan was ordered to remain in prison. With this ruling, Madigan could in the near future make an effort to appeal his conviction to the U.S. Supreme Court.

== Personal life ==
Madigan and his wife, Shirley, have four children. Shirley, who married Madigan in 1976, had served as the head of the Illinois Arts Council.

His oldest stepdaughter, Lisa Madigan, served as Attorney General of Illinois from 2003 to 2019. Lisa was born Lisa Murray to Shirley and criminal attorney Joel Murray. Shirley and Joel divorced and Shirley married Madigan when Lisa was 11 years old. Lisa changed her name when she was 18 and was formally adopted in her 20s.

Madigan's son-in-law Jordan Matyas (married to Madigan's daughter Tiffany Madigan) was the chief lobbyist for Regional Transportation Authority, serving a deputy chief overseeing their Government Affairs Department.

On June 6, 2019, Bishop Thomas Paprocki issued a decree barring Madigan and Senate President John Cullerton from presenting themselves to receive the Eucharist on account of their role in passing the Reproductive Health Act, which removes spousal consent and waiting periods for abortions.

== See also ==
- List of Illinois state legislatures

== Explanatory notes ==
Illinois House of Representatives
Preceded by Frank Savickas; Carl Klein	Member of the Illinois House of Representatives from the 27th district 1971–1983; Served alongside: Walter C. McAvoy, Robert Terzich, Edmund Kucharski, John Beatty	Succeeded by Harry Yourell
Preceded by Frank Giglio; Miriam Balanoff; Philip Collins	Member of the Illinois House of Representatives from the 30th district 1983–1993	Succeeded by Harold Murphy
Preceded by Daniel J. Burke	Member of the Illinois House of Representatives from the 22nd district 1993–2021	Succeeded by Edward Guerra Kodatt
Preceded by Gerald Shea	Majority Leader of the Illinois House of Representatives; 1977–1981	Succeeded by Arthur Telcser
Preceded by George Ryan	Minority Leader of the Illinois House of Representatives; 1981–1983	Succeeded by Lee Daniels
Preceded by Lee Daniels	Minority Leader of the Illinois House of Representatives; 1995–1997	Succeeded by Lee Daniels
Political offices
Preceded by Arthur Telcser	Speaker of the Illinois House of Representatives; 1983–1995	Succeeded by Lee Daniels
Preceded by Lee Daniels	Speaker of the Illinois House of Representatives; 1997–2021	Succeeded by Chris Welch
Party political offices
Preceded by Gary LaPaille	Chair of the Illinois Democratic Party; 1998–2021	Succeeded by Karen Yarbrough; Acting
