= Tazewell =

Tazewell may refer to:

== People ==
- Tazewell (name)

== Places ==
=== United States ===
- Tazewell, Georgia
- Tazewell, Virginia
- Tazewell County, Virginia
- Tazewell, Tennessee
- Tazewell County, Illinois
