= Angelica Guerrero-Cuellar =

American politician

Member of the Illinois House of Representatives from the 22nd district
- Incumbent
- Assumed office February 25, 2021
- Preceded by: Edward Guerra Kodatt

Personal details
- Party: Democratic
- Education: Roosevelt University (BA)

Angelica Guerrero-Cuellar is a Democratic member of the Illinois House of Representatives from the 22nd district since February 25, 2021. The 22nd district, located in the Chicago area, includes parts of Bedford Park and Burbank and includes all or parts of the Chicago neighborhoods of Archer Heights, Ashburn, Brighton Park, Chicago Lawn, Clearing, Gage Park, Garfield Ridge, West Elsdon, and West Lawn.

== Early life, education, and career ==
Guerrero-Cuellar grew up in South Lawndale, Chicago in Little Village and later in West Lawn, Chicago. She is the daughter of immigrant parents who originated from the state of Puebla in Mexico.

== Illinois House of Representatives ==
Guerrero-Cuellar was appointed by the Democratic Party to replace Edward Guerra Kodatt in the Illinois House of Representatives who resigned after three days in office. Kodatt was appointed to the Illinois General Assembly when Michael Madigan resigned from the Illinois General Assembly. Guerrero-Cuellar was sworn into office on February 25, 2021.

As of July 3, 2022, Representative Guerrero-Cuellar is a member of the following Illinois House committees:

- Appropriations - General Service Committee (HAPG)
- Health Care Availability & Access Committee (HHCA)
- Mental Health & Addiction Committee (HMEH)
- Police & Fire Committee (SHPF)
- Transportation: Regulation, Roads & Bridges Committee (HTRR)
- Transportation: Vehicles & Safety (HVES)

== Electoral history ==
Illinois 22nd Representative District Democratic Primary, 2022
Party	Candidate	Votes	%
Democratic	Angie Guerrero-Cuellar (incumbent)	5,538	100.0
Total votes		5,538	100.0

Illinois 22nd Representative District General Election, 2022
Party	Candidate	Votes	%
Democratic	Angie Guerrero-Cuellar (incumbent)	14,362	65.23
Republican	Carlos Alvarez	7,654	34.77
Total votes		22,016	100.0
