= 1970 Illinois elections =

- November 3, 1970
- Turnout: 69.90%

Elections were held in Illinois on Tuesday, November 3, 1970.

Primaries were held on March 17, 1970.

Additionally, on December 15, 1970, a special election was held in which Illinois voters voted in support of adopting a new proposed state constitution.

== Election information ==
1970 was a midterm election year in the United States.

=== Turnout ===
Turnout in the primary election was 29.88%, with a total of 1,570,317 ballots cast. 819,692 Democratic and 750,625 Republican primary ballots were cast.

Turnout during the general election was 69.90%, with 3,731,006 ballots cast.

2,017,717 people cast ballots in the December 15 special election regarding the proposed new Illinois constitution.

== Federal elections ==
=== United States Senate ===
A special election was held to fill the remainder of the term of Republican Everett Dirksen, who had died in office. Republican Ralph Tyler Smith had been appointed to fill the seat after Dirksen's death, and he lost the special election to Democrat Adlai Stevenson III.

=== United States House ===
All 24 Illinois seats in the United States House of Representatives were up for election in 1970.

No seats switched parties, so the party composition of Illinois' House delegation remained 12 Democrats and 12 Republicans.

== State elections ==
=== Treasurer ===
1970 Illinois State Treasurer election
- November 3, 1970
- Turnout: 65.15%
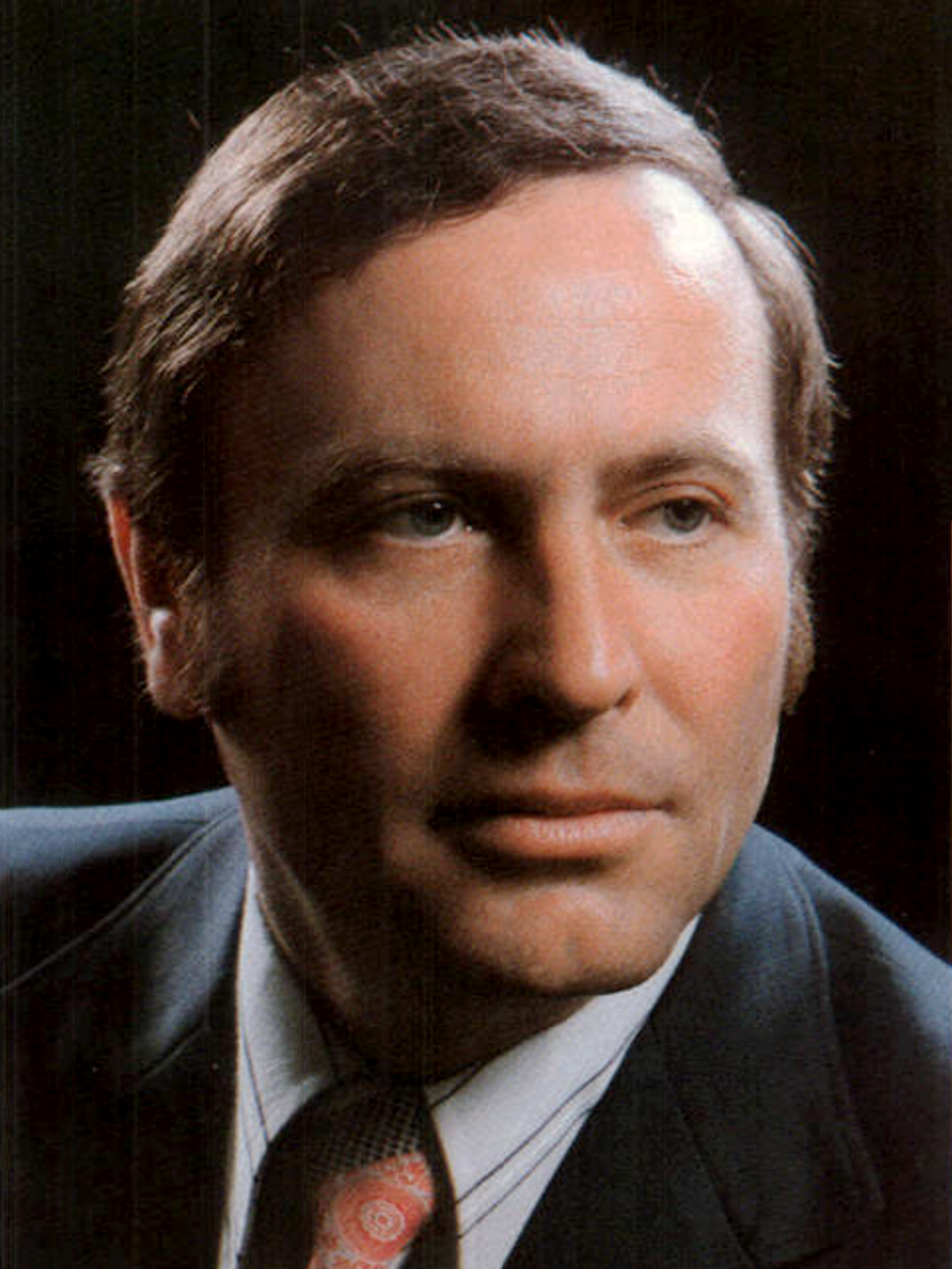

Nominee	Alan J. Dixon	Edmund J. Kucharski
Party	Democratic	Republican
Popular vote	1,772,209	1,683,437
Percentage	50.96%	48.41%
- County results Dixon: 40–50% 50–60% 60–70% Kucharski: 50–60% 60–70%
Treasurer before election
Adlai Stevenson III
Democratic
Elected Treasurer
Alan J. Dixon
Democratic

Incumbent Treasurer Adlai Stevenson III, a Democrat, did not seek a second term, instead opting to run for United States Senate. Democrat Alan J. Dixon was elected to succeed him in office.

Since Adlai Stevenson III assumed his U.S. Senate seat November 17, due to the nature of it being a special election, there was a brief vacancy in the treasurer's office before Dixon would assume office. Therefore, Governor Richard B. Ogilvie appointed Republican Charles W. Woodford to serve as treasurer from November 17 until Dixon took office on January 3.

==== Democratic primary ====
Treasurer Democratic primary
Party	Candidate	Votes	%
Democratic	Alan J. Dixon	584,021	100
Write-in	Others	5	0.0
Total votes		584,026	100

==== Republican primary ====
Treasurer Republican primary
Party	Candidate	Votes	%
Republican	Edmund J. Kucharski	564,682	100
Write-in	Others	2	0.00
Total votes		564,684	100

==== General election ====
Treasurer election
Party	Candidate	Votes	%
Democratic	Alan J. Dixon	1,772,209	50.96
Republican	Edmund J. Kucharski	1,683,437	48.41
Socialist Workers	Naomi Allen	13,119	0.38
Socialist Labor	John H. Brown, Jr.	8,923	0.26
Write-in	Others	19	0.00
Total votes		3,477,707	100

=== Superintendent of Public Instruction ===
1970 Illinois Superintendent of Public Instruction election
- November 3, 1970
- Turnout: 64.90%
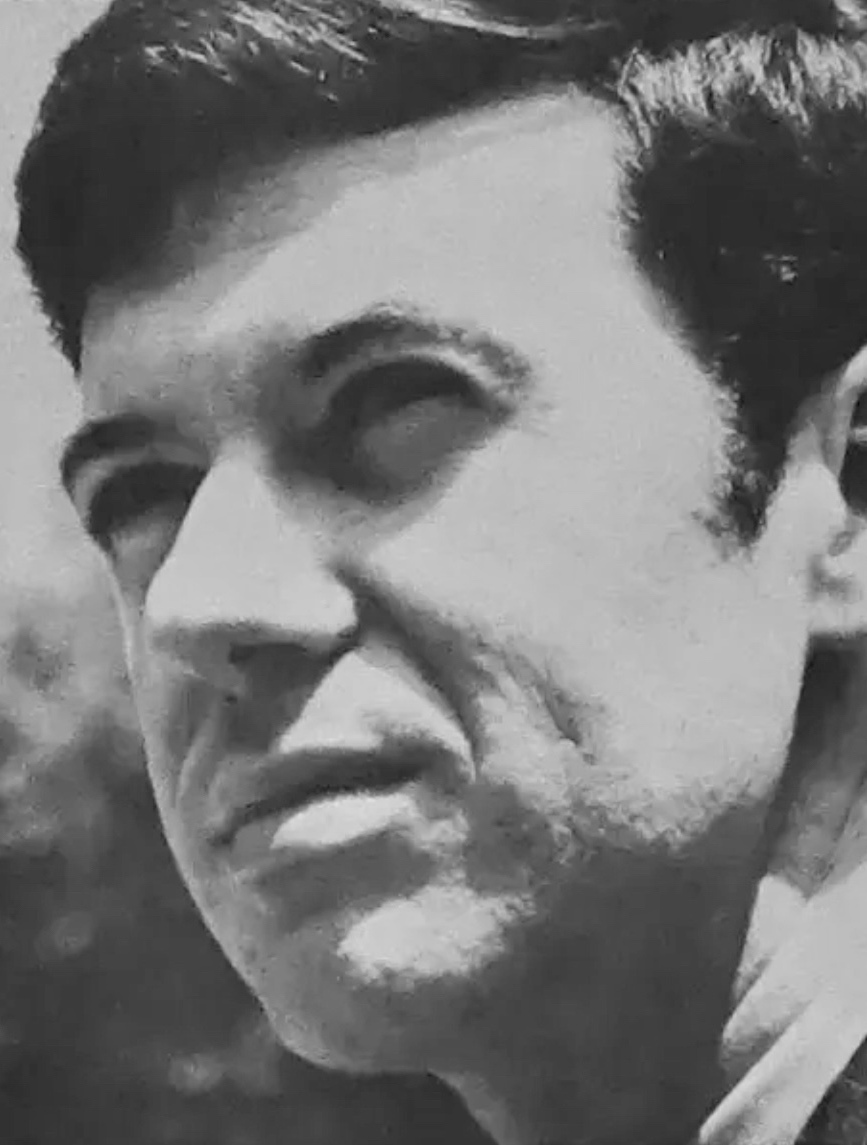

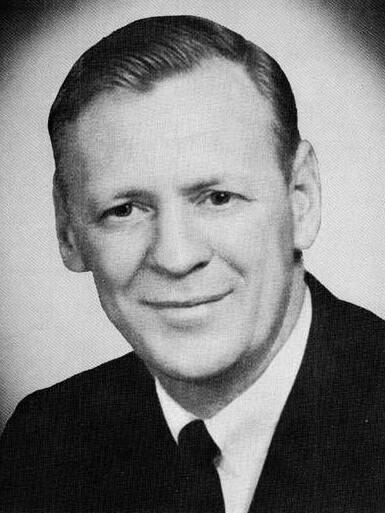
Nominee	Michael Bakalis	Ray Page
Party	Democratic	Republican
Popular vote	1,957,262	1,483,901
Percentage	56.50%	42.84%
- County results Bakalis: 50–60% 60–70% Page: 40–50% 50–60% 60–70%
Superintendent before election
Ray Page
Republican
Elected Superintendent
Michael Bakalis
Democratic

Incumbent Superintendent of Public Instruction Ray Page, a Republican seeking a third term, was defeated by Democrat Michael Bakalis.

==== Democratic primary ====
Superintendent of Public Instruction Democratic primary
Party	Candidate	Votes	%
Democratic	Michael Bakalis	556,752	100
Write-in	Others	6	0.0
Total votes		556,758	100

==== Republican primary ====
Superintendent of Public Instruction Republican primary
Party	Candidate	Votes	%
Republican	Ray Page (incumbent)	561,149	100
Write-in	Others	17	0.00
Total votes		561,166	100

==== General election ====
Superintendent of Public Instruction election
Party	Candidate	Votes	%
Democratic	Michael J. Bakalis	1,957,262	56.50
Republican	Ray Page (incumbent)	1,483,901	42.84
Socialist Workers	Emerson Allen	13,931	0.40
Socialist Labor	George A. LaForest	8,829	0.26
Write-in	Others	28	0.00
Total votes		3,463,951	100

=== State Senate ===
Seats in the Illinois Senate were up for election in 1970. While there was a 29-29 member split in the chamber after the election, Democrats flipped control of the chamber since there was a Democratic lieutenant governor (Paul Simon).

=== State House of Representatives ===
Seats in the Illinois House of Representatives were up for election in 1970. Republicans retained control of the chamber.

=== Trustees of University of Illinois ===
1970 Trustees of University of Illinois election
- November 3, 1970

Elections were held to elect Trustees of University of Illinois system. This included a regularly scheduled election of three seats, and a special election to fill a vacancy.

==== Regular election ====
The regular to fill three seats saw the election new Democratic members William D. Forsyth Jr., George W. Howard III, and Earl L. Neal.

Incumbent Republican Earl Edwin Walker (appointed in 1970) was not reelected. Incumbent Republican W. Clement Stone (appointed in 1969 to replace Harold Pogue following his death in office) lost reelection, running in the regular election instead of the special election to fill Pogue's seat. Second-term Democratic incumbent Howard W. Clement was not renominated. Also not renominated was Democrat Theodore A. Jones (who had been appointed in 1963, and thereafter reelected in 1964)

Trustees of the University of Illinois election
Party	Candidate	Votes	%
Democratic	William D.Forsyth, Jr.	1,847,018	18.52
Democratic	Earl L. Neal	1,799,712	18.05
Democratic	George W. Howard, III	1,718,008	17.23
Republican	W. Clement Stone (incumbent**)	1,550,038	15.54
Republican	William George Karnes	1,495,900	15.00
Republican	Earl Edwin Walker (incumbent)	1,470,326	14.75
Socialist Workers	Nancy Jean Cole	20,846	0.21
Socialist Workers	Deborah J. Notkin	16,266	0.16
Socialist Labor	Elizabeth Schnur	15,217	0.15
Socialist Workers	Mark Ugolini	14,024	0.14
Socialist Labor	Stanley L. Prorok	13,769	0.14
Socialist Labor	Clarys L. Essex	9,978	0.10
Total votes		9,971,102	100

==== Special election ====
Democrat Roger B. Pogue defeated Republican educator and Illinois State Representative Frances L. Dawson in the special election to fill the remaining two years of an unexpired term. Despite losing in the popular vote, Dawson placed first in 64 counties, while Pogue placed first in 38.

Incumbent Republican W. Clement Stone (appointed in 1969 to replace Harold Pogue, whose seat this had been, after his death in office), did not run in this election, instead running in the regular election for a full term.

Turnout for the special election was 60.87%.

Trustees of the University of Illinois special election
Party	Candidate	Votes	%
Democratic	Roger B. Pogue	1,670,201	51.41
Republican	Frances L. Dawson	1,578,787	48.59
Write-in	Others	3	0.00
Total votes		3,248,991	100

=== Judicial elections ===
Multiple judicial positions were up for election in 1970.

=== Ballot measures (November 3) ===
Three ballot measures (two legislatively referred constitutional amendments and one bond measure) were on the ballot on November 3. The two legislatively referred constitutional amendments proposed amendments to the existing 1870 Constitution of Illinois. In order to be placed on the ballot, legislatively referred constitutional amendments needed to be approved by two-thirds of each house of the Illinois General Assembly. In order to be approved, they required votes equal to a majority of those who voted in the 1970 elections, or two thirds of those voting specifically on the measure.

==== Illinois Ad Valorem Tax Prohibition Amendment ====
The Ad Valorem Tax Prohibition Amendment, also known as "Amendment 1", prohibited the taxation of personal property by valuation.

Illinois Ad Valorem Tax Prohibition Amendment
Option	Votes	% of votes on measure	% of all ballots cast
Yes	2,925,058	87.70	78.40%
No	410,333	12.30	11.00
Total votes	3,335,391	100	89.40
Voter turnout	62.49%		

Amendment 1 results by county Yes: 90–100%; 80–90%; 70–80%; 60–70%; 50–60%; No: 50–60%

==== Illinois Anti-Pollution Amendment ====
The Illinois Anti-Pollution Amendment, also known as "Amendment 2", approved the Anti-pollution Bond Act.

Bond measures needed a vote equal to majority of the votes cast for whichever chamber of the Illinois General Assembly had the highest cumulative vote count.

Illinois Anti-Pollution Amendment
Option	Votes	% of highest legislative vote cast
Yes	2,291,718	
No	544,116	
Total votes	2,835,834	
Voter turnout	53.13%	

Amendment 2 results by county Yes: 90–100%; 80–90%; 70–80%; 60–70%; 50–60%; No: 60–70%; 50–60%

==== Illinois Banking Act Amendment ====
The Illinois Banking Act Amendment, also known as "Amendment 3", enabled state chartered banks to have the same powers as national banks.

Illinois Banking Act Amendment
Option	Votes	% of votes on measure	% of all ballots cast
Yes	2,925,058	87.70	78.40
No	410,333	12.30	11.00
Total votes	3,335,391	100	78.40
Voter turnout	62.49%		

Amendment 3 results by county Yes: 80–90%; 70–80%; 60–70%; 50–60%; No: 60–70%

=== Ballot measures (December 15) ===
A December 15 special election was held in which the proposed 1970 Constitution of Illinois itself was up for election, as were several constitutional convention referral items. The constitutional convention referral items would only take effect if the new constitution itself was approved.

The constitution (authored at the Sixth Illinois Constitutional Convention) and all amendments to amend it were required to be approved by at least half of all those casting ballots in the election.

2,017,717 people cast ballots.

==== Constitution Ratification Question ====
Constitution Ratification Question, 1970
- Concerns the Ratification of the 1970 Illinois Constitution

Results
Choice	Votes	%
Yes	1,122,425	57.25%
No	838,168	42.75%
Valid votes	1,960,593	100.00%
Invalid or blank votes	0	0.00%
Total votes	1,960,593	100.00%
Yes
70–80%
60–70%
50–60%
No
80–90%
70–80%
60–70%
50–60%

Illinois voters voted on whether or not the state would adopt the Illinois Constitution of 1970.

Illinois Constitution Ratification Question
Option	Votes	% of all ballots cast
Yes	1,122,425	55.63
No	838,168	41.54
Total votes	1,960,593	97.17

==== Appoint All Judges Amendment ====
The Appoint All Judges Amendment was a ballot question which asked voters whether judges should be appointed by the governor from a list of nominees or elected by the people.

If voters had voted for appointment, Illinois' constitution would have contained an article outlining a Missouri Plan-syle "merit selection" system in which the governor would nominate judicial appointees that had first been recommended by judicial nominating commission. The Illinois Bar Association had endorsed a vote for appointed judges. However, the state's voters instead opted to retain direct election of judges. As a result, Illinois retained the system of judicial election that had been outlined in the previous constitution after the adoption of the 1962 Illinois Judicial Amendment

Appoint All Judges Amendment
Option	Votes	% of all ballots cast
Elect	1,013,559	50.23
Appoint	867,230	42.98
Total votes	1,880,789	93.21

Amendment results by county Election: 80–90%; 70–80%; 60–70%; 50–60%; Appointment: 50–60%

==== Death Penalty Amendment ====
The Death Penalty Amendment proposed abolishing the death penalty in Illinois. It was defeated.

Death Penalty Amendment
Option	Votes	% of all ballots cast
Yes	676,302	33.52
No	1,218,791	60.41
Total votes	1,895,093	93.92

Amendment results by county No: 80–90%; 70–80%; 60–70%; 50–60%

==== State Representation Amendment ====
The Illinois State Representation Amendment (also known as the "Elect Legislature Question") was a ballot question which asked voters whether they wished to retain multi-member districts in the state legislature of switch to single-member districts.

State Representation Amendment
Option	Votes	% of all ballots cast
Multi-Member	1,031,241	51.11
Single-Member	749,909	37.17
Total votes	1,781,150	88.28

Amendment results by county Multi: 60–70%; 50–60%; Single: 70–80%; 60–70%; 50–60%

==== Voting Age Amendment ====
The Voting Age Amendment proposed lowering the age of suffrage to 18. It was defeated.

Voting Age Amendment
Option	Votes	% of all ballots cast
Yes	869,816	43.11
No	1,052,924	52.18
Total votes	1,922,740	95.29

Amendment results by county No: 70–80%; 60–70%; 50–60%; Yes: 50–60%

== Local elections ==
Local elections were held.
