= Mt. Sidney School =

Historic school building in Virginia, US

- U.S. National Register of Historic Places
- Virginia Landmarks Register
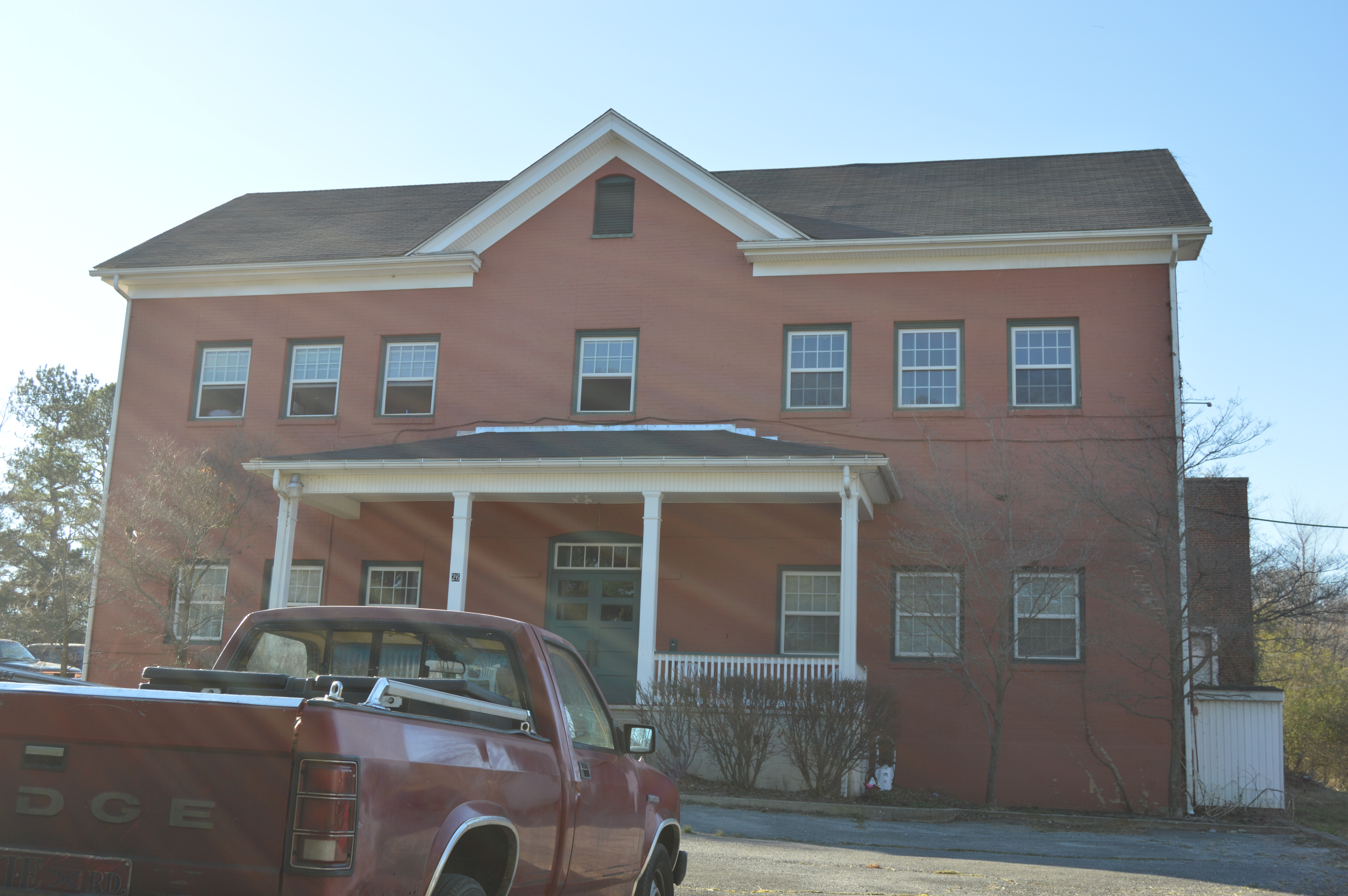
- Front of the school

- Location within Virginia Location within the United States
- Location: VA 11, Mount Sidney, Virginia
- Coordinates: 38°15′22″N 78°57′43″W
- Area: 1 acre (0.40 ha)
- Built: 1912; 114 years ago, 1921; 105 years ago, 1935; 91 years ago
- Built by: Charles Fretwell
- MPS: Public Schools in Augusta County Virginia 1870--1940 TR
- NRHP reference No.: 85000391
- VLR No.: 007-1155

Significant dates
- Added to NRHP: February 27, 1985
- Designated VLR: December 11, 1984

Mt. Sidney School is a historic public school building located at Mount Sidney, Augusta County, Virginia. the original portion was built in 1912, and is the front gable-roofed, two-story block with an I-house plan consisting of two rooms and a central hallway on each floor. It features a central cross gable, one-story, three-bay porch. A four-room brick addition was built in 1921 and a gymnasium added in 1935. The school closed in 1967, and was subsequently remodeled into apartments.

It was listed on the National Register of Historic Places in 1985.
