= Mount Sidney, Virginia =

Mount Sidney
- CDP
- Location within the Commonwealth of Virginia
- Coordinates: 38°15′18″N 78°58′17″W
- Country: United States
- State: Virginia
- County: Augusta

Population (2010)
  - Total: 663
- Time zone: UTC−5 (Eastern (EST))
  - Summer (DST): UTC−4 (EDT)
- ZIP codes: 24467
- FIPS code: 51-54120
- GNIS feature ID: 2584886

Mount Sidney is a census-designated place in Augusta County, Virginia, United States. As of the 2020 census, Mount Sidney had a population of 678.

The Mt. Sidney Historic District and Mt. Sidney School are listed on the National Register of Historic Places.

== Demographics ==
Historical population
Census	Pop.	Note	%±
2010	663		—
2020	678		2.3%
U.S. Decennial Census; 2010 2020

Mount Sidney was first listed as a census designated place in the 2010 U.S. census.

== See also ==
- Ida Stover Eisenhower
