= Brookfield-LaGrange Park School District 95 =

School district in Illinois, United States

Address
- 3724 Prairie Avenue Brookfield, Illinois, 60513; United States

District information
- Type: Public
- Grades: PreK–8
- NCES District ID: 1707320

Students and staff
- Students: 1,354

Brookfield-LaGrange Park School District 95 (D95) is a school district headquartered in Brookfield, Illinois in the Chicago area.

Brookfield - Lagrange Park School District 95 has 2 schools Brook Park Elementary School and S.E. Gross Middle School.

It includes most of Brookfield and parts of LaGrange Park.

Mark Kuzniewski became the superintendent in 2009. He retired in the 2024 - 2025 school year. He was previously the principal of Buffalo Grove District 102's Aptakisic Junior High School. In 2020, Kuzniewski received a five-year contract renewal.

Ryan Evans became the superintendent in 2025. He previously was a Social Studies teacher, Assisant principal and principal at S.E. Gross Middle School.

Brook Park Elementary School:

Currently for the 2025 - 2026 School year:

Kelly King is the K - 2 Grade principal

Micheal Sorenson is the 3 - 5 Grade principal

Jill Johnson is the Assistant Principal for Brook Park

S.E. Gross Middle School:

Currently for the 2025 - 2026 school year:

Lauren Colberg (Previously Assisant Principal) will become S.E. Gross Middle School's new principal.

Dave Parolin will become the new assistant principal. He previously was the assistant principal of Elm Middle School in Elmwood Park.
