= Mt. Sidney Historic District =

Historic district in Virginia, United States

- U.S. National Register of Historic Places
- U.S. Historic district
- Virginia Landmarks Register
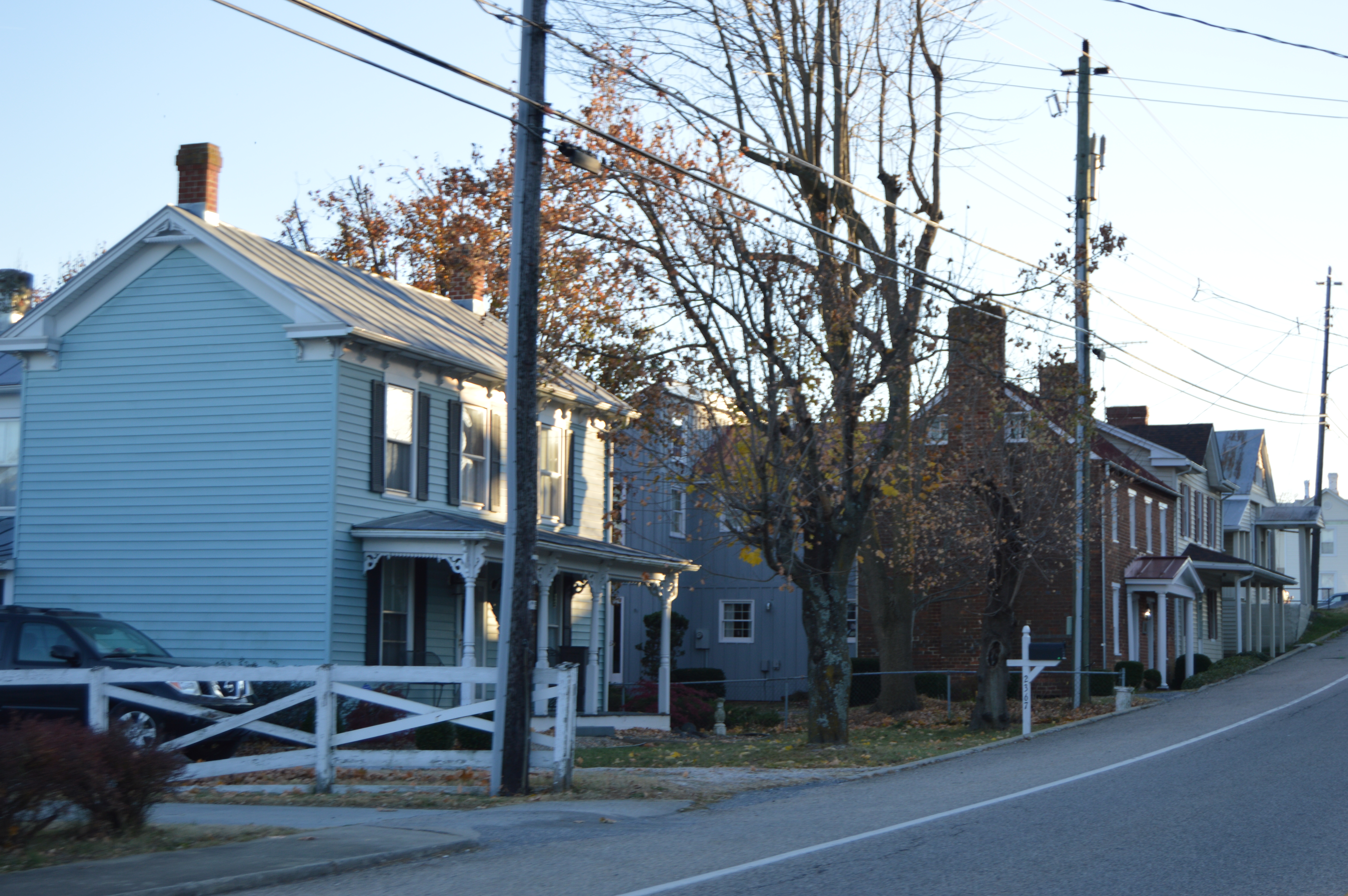
- Houses on Main Street

- Location within Virginia Location within the United States
- Location: Lee Highway, Mt. Sidney School Ln., Pottery Shop Ln., Mount Sidney, Virginia
- Coordinates: 38°15′22″N 78°57′36″W
- Area: 40 acres (16 ha)
- Built: 1835
- Architectural style: Federal, Greek Revival, Late Victorian
- NRHP reference No.: 98001313
- VLR No.: 007-1300

Significant dates
- Added to NRHP: October 30, 1998
- Designated VLR: July 21, 1981

Mt. Sidney Historic District is a national historic district located at Mount Sidney, Augusta County, Virginia. It encompasses 74 contributing buildings and 16 contributing sites in the rural village of Mount Sidney. The oldest buildings date to the 1820s and are located along the west side of the main street. Notable buildings include the Markwood House (1834), Moorman House (1835), James Ross House (c. 1840), Hyde Tavern (c. 1852), Mt. Sidney Methodist Church and Cemetery (1850), and Mt. Sidney African Methodist Episcopal Church and cemetery (1802, 1865-1875).

It was listed on the National Register of Historic Places in 1998.
