= Tazewell (name) =

Tazewell is both a surname and a masculine given name. Notable people with the name include:

Surname:

- Charles Tazewell (1900–1972), American writer
- Henry Tazewell (1753–1799), American politician
- Littleton Waller Tazewell (1774–1860), American politician
- Paul Tazewell, American costume designer

Given name:

- Tazewell Ellett (1856–1914), American politician
- Tazewell B. Tanner (1821–1881), American politician
- Tazewell Thompson (born 1948), American playwright and theater director
