= John Sevcik =

American baseball player (born 1942)

- Catcher
- Born: July 11, 1942; Oak Park, Illinois, U.S.
- Batted: Right Threw: Right

MLB debut
- April 24, 1965, for the Minnesota Twins

Last MLB appearance
- October 3, 1965, for the Minnesota Twins

MLB statistics
- Games: 12
- At bats: 16
- Hits: 1
- Stats at Baseball Reference

Teams
- Minnesota Twins (1965)

John Joseph Sevcik (/ˈsɛvsɪk/ SEV-sik; born July 11, 1942) is an American former baseball player who played one season in Major League Baseball for the 1965 Minnesota Twins. Sevcik was a catcher and was listed at 6 feet 2 inches (1.88 m) tall and 205 pounds (93 kg) and threw and batted right-handed.

== Early life ==
John was born on July 11, 1942 in Oak Park, Illinois, to Joseph and Helen Sevcik (née Urban), twenty minutes after his twin brother James (known as "Jim"). His sister Janet was born five years afterwards.

His father was of Czechoslovak heritage and was a lawyer who served as a Republican in the Illinois House of Representatives from 1967 until his death in 1977. His mother Helen was of Lithuanian descent and was a homemaker.

After spending his early years in Chicago, Sevcik and his family moved to Berwyn, Illinois when he was around seven. He attended Morton East High School in Cicero, Illinois before transferring to Morton West High School in Berwyn with the latter opened in 1958; he and his brother Jim played varsity baseball and football.

From 1960 to 1964, John and Jim both attended the University of Missouri where they played baseball and football. John was the starting catcher for the Missouri Tigers baseball team which went to the College World Series every year of his tenure with the team.

Sevcik was signed by the Minnesota Twins after graduating college.

== Playing career ==
As he had signed under the bonus rule then in force, Sevcik spent the entire 1965 season on the roster of the Minnesota Twins. He appeared in 12 games that season, with one hit (a double off Wally Bunker of the Baltimore Orioles September 28) in 16 at bats (.063) and one run scored.

John Sevcik's pro career lasted for eight seasons (1964–71), all but 1965 in minor league baseball. In seven years in the minors, he recorded a batting average of .266, 431 hits (including 59 doubles, 8 triples, and 22 home runs), and 169 runs batted in.

His brother Jim, an outfielder, spent four years in the Twins' farm system before retiring from baseball.

== Personal life ==
In 1964, Secvik married Glenda Lea Klipstein in a ceremony in Bismarck, North Dakota. They had met when he was attending the University of Missouri; she was a student at the nearby Stephens College.

After his baseball career ended, the couple initially lived in Minneapolis, Minnesota where Glenda opened an interior design and antiques business and John worked in construction equipment sales. Later in life, they moved to San Antonio, Texas where he worked in the liquor industry until he retired in 2006.

Since retiring, the couple have resided in Austin, Texas where Sevcik remains physically active by playing golf regularly at a local golf club. He is a fan of the Minnesota Twins.
