= Edward Guerra Kodatt =

American politician

Member of the Illinois House of Representatives from the 22nd district
- In office February 21, 2021 – February 24, 2021
- Preceded by: Michael Madigan
- Succeeded by: Angelica Guerrero-Cuellar

Personal details
- Born: 1994 (age 31–32)
- Party: Democratic
- Education: Eastern Illinois University

Edward Guerra Kodatt (born c. 1994) is an American politician. On February 21, 2021, he was appointed to the Illinois House of Representatives to replace Michael Madigan, but resigned after just three days in office, following a written demand by Madigan and Alderman Marty Quinn that he do so in light of unspecified "allegations of questionable conduct." Kodatt's replacement in the House of Representatives was Angelica Guerrero-Cuellar.

Prior to entering the Illinois House, Kodatt worked as infrastructure manager for the Chicago City Council.

== Personal life ==
Kodatt was born in Southwest Side, Chicago. He graduated from St. Rita of Cascia High School and received a business degree from Eastern Illinois University.

He is engaged to Vanessa Ramirez.
