= Edgar N. Eisenhower =

American lawyer

Edgar Eisenhower
- Born: Edgar Newton Eisenhower; January 19, 1889; Hope, Kansas, U.S.
- Died: July 12, 1971 (aged 82); Tacoma, Washington, U.S.
- Education: University of Michigan (LL.B.)
- Occupations: Attorney, businessman
- Relatives: Dwight D. Eisenhower (brother); Milton S. Eisenhower (brother); Earl D. Eisenhower (brother); John Eisenhower (nephew)

Edgar Newton Eisenhower (January 19, 1889 – July 12, 1971) was an American lawyer and businessman, the older brother of President Dwight D. Eisenhower.

== Early life and education ==
Eisenhower was born in Hope, Kansas, the second oldest of seven Eisenhower brothers, six of them surviving infancy. Dwight D. Eisenhower, one year his junior, served in various roles in the United States Army before becoming president in 1953.

Edgar's youngest brother, Milton S. Eisenhower became a university president. Earl D. Eisenhower, nine years his junior, served in the Illinois House of Representatives.

Edgar and Dwight had planned after high school to trade off working a year each at a creamery to pay for the other's college, but that plan ended after Dwight was admitted into West Point. Eisenhower graduated from the University of Michigan with an LL.B. in 1914.

== Career ==
After earning his law degree, Eisenhower began practicing law in Tacoma, Washington. He was also the director of the St. Regis Paper Company, the Puget Sound National Bank (now KeyBank), and the Harmon FS Manufacturing Co.

Beginning in 1940, Eisenhower lived in a modest brick home on the west side of American Lake in Lakewood, Washington. Eisenhower was married three times, first to Louise Alexander Eisenhower (1893–1946), whom he married in 1911, then to Bernice Thompson Eisenhower (1902–1948) in 1930, and finally to his legal secretary Lucille Dawson Eisenhower (1921–2012) in 1951. Eisenhower divorced her in 1967, after sixteen years of marriage, asserting that she caused "a burdensome home life". Eisenhower had two children, both with his first wife: Merrill Jack Eisenhower (1916–1956), and Janis Louise Eisenhower Causin (1922–2000).

He died in Tacoma, Washington, on July 12, 1971, at the age of 82. Eisenhower is buried in Mountain View Cemetery in Lakewood.

== Sources ==
- McCallum, John D. (2009). Six Roads From Abilene: Some Personal Recollections of Edgar Eisenhower. Kessinger Publishing, LLC. ISBN 978-1104845377
