= Constitution of Illinois =

Legal document

Official seal of Illinois

The Constitution of the State of Illinois is the governing document of the state of Illinois. There have been four Illinois Constitutions, with the fourth and current version adopted in 1970. That constitution is referred to as the "Constitution of Illinois of 1970" or less formally as the "1970 Constitution" even though there have been amendments to it after 1970. Important features of the 1970 Constitution include the creation of home rule powers for larger municipalities and other units of local government.

== Text ==
The 1970 Constitution has a preamble and 14 articles.

=== Preamble ===
The preamble of the 1970 Constitution is as follows:

We, the People of the State of Illinois—grateful to Almighty God for the civil, political and religious liberty which He has permitted us to enjoy and seeking His blessing upon our endeavors—in order to provide for the health, safety and welfare of the people; maintain a representative and orderly government; eliminate poverty and inequality; assure legal, social and economic justice; provide opportunity for the fullest development of the individual; insure domestic tranquility; provide for the common defense; and secure the blessings of freedom and liberty to ourselves and our posterity—do ordain and establish this Constitution for the State of Illinois.

=== Article 1: Bill of Rights ===
The bill of rights contains similar provisions as the United States Bill of Rights, such as freedom of religion, freedom of speech and freedom of assembly. It also contains items not included in the United States Constitution like section 18, which prohibits discrimination based on sex and section 19, which prohibits discrimination based on physical or mental handicaps.

=== Article 2: Powers of the State ===
Describes the division of powers into executive, legislative and judicial branches.

=== Article 3: Suffrage and Elections ===
Describes voting qualifications, disqualifications and other election rules. Section 1 stipulates that a person must be 18 years old and a resident of the state for 30 days to vote. Section 4 provides for the Illinois General Assembly to establish rules for elections. Section 5 establishes rules for the state board of election, requiring for no political party to have a majority on the board. Section 7 provides procedures to recall the governor.

=== Article 4: The Legislature ===
Provides rules for the Illinois General Assembly. Section 1 divides the assembly into two bodies, the Illinois Senate with 59 legislative districts, and the Illinois House of Representatives, with 118 representative districts. Section 2 describes the composition of the two bodies. Section 3 describes legislative redistricting procedures. Section 9 describes procedures involving executive vetoes of legislation. Section 14 describes impeachment rules, under which Governor Rod Blagojevich was impeached in the House and removed from office after a trial in the Senate.

=== Article 5: The Executive ===
Describes rules for the six state elected members, Governor, Lieutenant Governor, Attorney General, Secretary of State, Comptroller, and Treasurer.

=== Article 6: The Judiciary ===
Sets up rules for Supreme Court of Illinois, the Illinois Appellate Court, and the circuit or trial courts of Illinois.

=== Article 7: Local Government ===
Provides rules for county, township, and city governments and provides them with a limited ability to pass ordinances.

=== Article 8: Finance ===
Provides for financial matters including obligation of funds, budgeting, spending, and audits.

=== Article 9: Revenue ===
Provides rules for various forms of taxation and state debt.

=== Article 10: Education ===
Establishes the goal of free schooling through secondary education and creates a state board of education.

=== Article 11: Environment ===
Grants each person the "right to a healthful environment." It sets that to be public policy and the duty of individuals to that a healthful environment is maintained.

=== Article 12: Militia ===
Sets rules for the state militia: "The State militia consists of all able-bodied persons residing in the State except those exempted by law." It establishes the governor as the commander in chief of the militia and grants authority to use the militia to "enforce the laws, suppress insurrection or repel invasion."

=== Article 13: General provisions ===
Establishes rules for persons holding public office. Section 5 prohibits reducing the pension benefits of public employees. Section 7 provides for public transportation and allows the General Assembly to spend money to provide it.

=== Article 14: Constitutional Revision ===
Describes procedures for amending the constitution. Section 1 describes rules for constitutional conventions. This article requires that Illinois voters be asked at least every 20 years if they desire a constitutional convention. In 1988 the measure failed 900,109 votes for and 2,727,144 against the measure. 1,069,939 other voters chose neither option. In 2008, there was an effort by citizens to support a convention. Ultimately, the measure was also defeated by a wide margin, 1,493,203 votes for and 3,062,724 against from a total of 5,539,172 votes cast. 983,245 voters chose neither option.

(Source: Southwestern Illinois College. Constitution study Guide. The Illinois Constitution.)

== History ==
=== Convention of 1818 ===
When statehood for Illinois was approved on April 18, 1818, the U.S. Congress approved the formation of a state constitution. An election for delegates to a state constitutional convention was scheduled for July 6, 1818. All white male U.S. citizens who had resided in the Illinois Territory for at least six months prior to the election, or whom were otherwise qualified to vote for representation, were permitted to vote. The main topics of the election were whether it was sensible to have a constitution at that time and, if so, whether to form it and how to select appropriate representatives to frame it. Madison, St. Clair, and Gallatin counties were allocated three delegates each, while all other counties were allocated two delegates each.

Delegates elected were to attend a meeting at Kaskaskia on August 3. Any record of this election has been lost and it is uncertain where the subsequent meeting was held. However, John Reynolds later noted that the meeting was largely peaceful although there were questions about how to handle slavery. The first state constitution was adopted August 26, 1818, in Kaskaskia, Illinois.

=== Subsequent 19th century conventions ===
Succeeding constitutions were ratified in 1848, 1870 and 1970.

In 1862, a constitutional convention was held, but the changes known as the "Copperhead constitution" were not ratified by the voters. Thomas J. Turner and Tazewell B. Tanner were delegates to an 1863 Illinois constitutional convention. A constitutional convention was held in 1920, but in 1922 the changes were rejected by voters.

=== Constitution of 1970 ===
In the 1968 Illinois elections, voters approved a call for a constitutional convention. The 1969 Illinois constitutional convention election selected the delegates who then wrote the new proposed constitution during the proceeding convention. The Sixth Illinois Constitutional Convention convened on December 8, 1969 and concluded on September 3, 1970.

The resulting fourth version of the Illinois Constitution was ratified by special election on December 15, 1970, and went into effect on July 1, 1971. In addition to the constitutional ratification question, the convention placed two particularly controversial questions before the voters as separate amendments. On the Illinois Appoint All Judges Amendment, voters chose to have state judges be elected rather than selected by gubernatorial appointment. On the Illinois State Representation Amendment, voters chose to retain multi-member districts in the Illinois House of Representatives, rather than switching to single-member districts; this decision was reversed by the Cutback Amendment a decade later.

Some provisions, such as the change in the dates for the election of constitutional officers, did not take effect for several years. Important features of the fourth Illinois Constitution include the creation of home rule powers for larger municipalities and other units of local government.

Since its ratification, the constitution has been amended fourteen times. As of 2026, the most recent amendment to the Illinois Constitution was in 2022, with the ratification of the Right to Collective Bargaining Amendment. The processes for amending the constitution are outlined in Article XIV.

== See also ==
- Law of Illinois
