= Cory Foster =

American politician

Cory Foster was a Democratic member of the Illinois House of Representatives from the 7th district for a brief period from December 2012 until January 2013.

== Illinois General Assembly ==
Foster, of Bellwood, was appointed to replace Karen Yarbrough for the remainder of the 97th General Assembly, who chose to retire from the Illinois House to run for Cook County Recorder, after her election to the position. After the 97th General Assembly, he stepped down and was succeeded by Emanuel Chris Welch, who was elected in the 2012 general election to be the representative from the 7th district. He returned to his position in the administration of Pat Quinn.

Preceded by Karen Yarbrough	Member of the Illinois House of Representatives from the 7th district December 2012 – January 2013	Succeeded by Emanuel Chris Welch
