= Karen Yarbrough =

American politician (1950–2024)

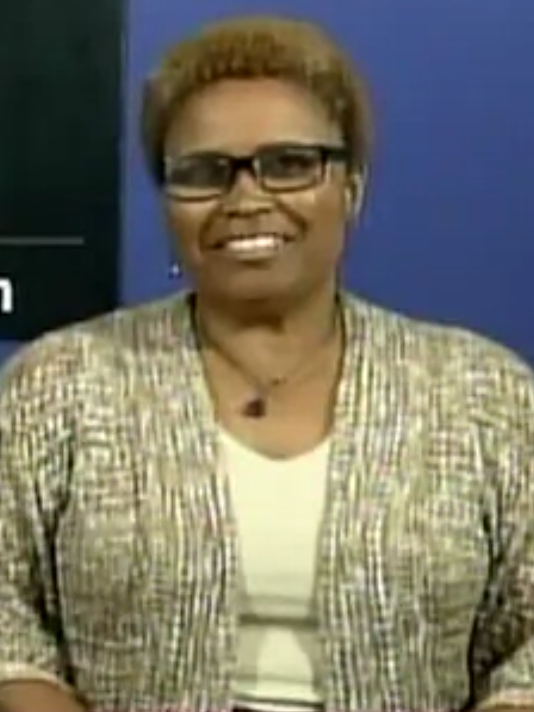
- Yarbrough in 2013

Chair of the Illinois Democratic Party
- Acting
- In office February 22, 2021 – March 3, 2021
- Preceded by: Michael Madigan
- Succeeded by: Robin Kelly

23rd Clerk of Cook County
- In office December 3, 2018 – April 7, 2024
- Preceded by: David Orr
- Succeeded by: Monica Gordon; Cedric Giles (acting)

Cook County Recorder of Deeds
- In office December 2012 – December 3, 2018
- Preceded by: Eugene Moore
- Succeeded by: Edward Moody

Member of the Illinois House of Representatives from the 7th district
- In office January 2001 – December 2012
- Preceded by: Wanda Sharp
- Succeeded by: Cory Foster

Personal details
- Born: August 22, 1950 Washington, D.C., U.S.
- Died: April 7, 2024 (aged 73) Maywood, Illinois, U.S.
- Party: Democratic
- Spouse: Henderson Yarbrough
- Education: Chicago State University (BA); Northeastern Illinois University (MA)

Karen A. Yarbrough (August 22, 1950 – April 7, 2024) was an American politician who served as the Cook County Clerk from 2018 until her death in 2024. Yarbrough served as a member of the Illinois House of Representatives from 2001 to 2013, and as Cook County Recorder of Deeds from 2012 to 2018. She briefly served as the interim chair of the Democratic Party of Illinois after long-time chair Michael Madigan resigned from the position in February 2021. Elected to the office of Cook County Clerk on November 6, 2018, she was the first woman and African American to hold the position. She held the position until her death in April 2024.

== Early life and education ==
Yarbrough was born on August 22, 1950, in Washington, D.C. Her family moved to Maywood, Illinois in the 1960s, and Yarbrough's father, Don Williams Sr., was an insurance agent who later became mayor of the village. She earned a bachelor's degree in Business Administration from Chicago State University, a master's in Inner City Studies from Northeastern Illinois University and attended nondegree executive education at the John F. Kennedy School of Government.

== Political career and community involvement ==
In 1998, Yarbrough unsuccessfully challenged incumbent Eugene Moore in the Democratic primary for the 7th district seat in the Illinois House of Representatives.

Yarbrough ran again for the 7th district seat in the Illinois House of Representatives again in 2000, this time succeeding, unseating incumbent Wanda Sharp in the Democratic primary and winning the general election. Her term began in January 2001, and she was later appointed an assistant majority leader in 2011 and 2012. Yarbrough left the Illinois House of Representatives in 2012 and became Cook County Recorder of Deeds in December that year.

On November 6, 2018, Yarbrough ran unopposed and was elected as the Clerk of Cook County, becoming the first woman and African-American to be elected as the county clerk of Cook County. She took office on December 3, 2018 and was preceded by retiring clerk David Orr, and served until her death on April 7, 2024.

On February 22, 2021, Yarbrough was appointed as acting Chair of the Democratic Party of Illinois, after preceding chairman Mike Madigan resigned. She held this position until Robin Kelly was elected as Chair of the Illinois Democratic Party on March 3.

She served on several house committees, including as chairwoman of the Housing and Urban Development, vice-chairwoman of the House Insurance Committee, on the Environmental Health Committee, Appropriations-Public Safety Committee, and the Computer Technology Committee. Yarbrough was a member of the Illinois Legislative Black Caucus.

Yarbrough served as vice-chair of the Democratic Party of Illinois. She was regarded as an ally of former state party chairman Michael Madigan.

Yarbrough was the founder and CEO of Hathaway Insurance Agency, where she worked for thirty years. She served as president of the Maywood Chamber of Commerce, and on the boards of United Way of Suburban Chicago and the Oak Park YMCA.

== Personal life and death ==
Yarbrough was married to Henderson Yarbrough, Sr., a former Maywood village trustee and Maywood village president, the latter position of which he served from 2005 to 2013. They had six children and twelve grandchildren.

On April 7, 2024, Yarbrough died after being hospitalized with an undisclosed illness at Loyola University Medical Center in Maywood. She was 73.

Party political offices
Preceded by Michael Madigan	Chair of the Illinois Democratic Party; Acting; 2021	Succeeded by Robin Kelly
