= Tazewell B. Tanner =

American politician

Tazewell or Tazwell B. Tanner (November 6, 1821 – March 21, 1881) was an American lawyer, judge, politician, and newspaper editor.

Tanner was born in Danville, Virginia. He went to McKendree College and was a schoolteacher. In 1846, he moved to Jefferson County, Illinois. In 1849, Tanner moved to California and was involved mining for gold during the California Gold Rush. He returned to Illinois and studied law. Tanner was admitted to the Illinois bar and practiced law in Mount Vernon, Illinois. Tanner was elected clerk of the Illinois Circuit Court for Jefferson County. He was also the editor of The Jeffersonian newspaper in Mount Vernon and was involved with the Democratic Party. Tanner served in the Illinois House of Representatives in 1855 and 1856. He served in the Illinois constitutional convention of 1863. In 1873, he was elected an Illinois Circuit Court judge. Tanner died in Mount Vernon, Illinois.

The Paris 20s pianist, Allen Caldwell Tanner, was his grandson.
