= Gerald W. Shea =

American politician (1931–2015)

Gerald W. Shea (July 25, 1931 – December 13, 2015) was a politician from Illinois.

== Biography ==
Shea was born July 25, 1931, in Oak Park, Illinois. He dropped out of high school to support his family during the printer's strike against the Chicago Tribune. He returned to school and completed degrees at the University of Illinois School of Commerce and the DePaul University College of Law. Shea took a two-year hiatus from his education to join the United States Army. He served in the Korean War. In 1958, Shea received a sponsorship from John S. Boyle, the Democratic Committeeman from Oak Park Township, to work as a caseworker in the Cook County Department of Public Aid. A year later, he became a department investigator. Boyle promoted Shea to assistant state's attorney, and later Director of Research, Planning & Development for the Cook County Circuit Court. By 1966, he was married to Joanne (née Sevcik), the niece of Representative Joseph G. Sevcik, with whom he had one daughter.

He was elected to the Illinois House of Representatives in 1966. During his legislative career, he served as Assistant Minority Leader during the 77th and 78th General Assemblies and as Majority Leader during the 79th. His committee assignments included Judiciary, Insurance, Water Resources and Constitutional Convention committees. He was also chairman of Judicial Administration Section of Illinois State Bar Association, Illinois Judicial Advisory Council, Legislative Reference Bureau, Local Government Tax Study Commission, Illinois Legislative Investigating Commission. He was a member of the Illinois Transportation Study Commission, the Fiscal and Economic Commission and as one of the Illinois Secretary of State's appointees to the Advisory Commission for the Securities Division.

He abruptly retired after serving five terms. He was succeeded as the Cook County floor leader by Michael Madigan. After his retirement from the House, Shea became a lobbyist. George Ryan appointed Shea the Chair of the University of Illinois Board of Trustees. He served from 1999 until 2002. Shea died in La Grange, Illinois on December 13, 2015.
