= Joseph G. Sevcik =

American lawyer and politician

Joseph G. Sevcik (November 24, 1916 – September 29, 1977) was an American lawyer and politician.

Sevcik was born in Chicago, Illinois and went to the Chicago public schools. He served in the United States Military during World War II. He went to Central YMCA College, University of Illinois and John Marshall Law School. Sevcik was admitted to the Illinois bar in 1947. He lived with his wife and family in Berwyn, Illinois and practiced law in Berwyn. He served as the attorney for the City and Township of Berwyn. Sevcik served in the Illinois House of Representatives from 1967 until his death in 1977. He was a Republican. Sevcik died from a heart attack at the St. Mary of Nazareth Hospital in Chicago, Illinois. His niece Joanne Sevcik was married to Gerald W. Shea who also served in the Illinois General Assembly.

He was married to Helen (nee Urban) and had three children: twin sons John and Jim, and daughter Janet. John and Jim became professional baseball players, with John having a brief career in the Majors as a back-up catcher with the 1965 Minnesota Twins.
