= Wanda Sharp =

American politician

Wanda J. Sharp (born July 23, 1950) is an American politician.

Born in Chicago, Illinois, Sharp worked as a supervisor, safety trainer, and coordinator for Ford Motor Company. Sharp is an African-American. She served on the board of trustees for the village of Maywood, Illinois and was involved with the Democratic Party. On January 29, 1999, Sharp was appointed to the Illinois House of Representatives and served until 2001.
