= Venedy, Illinois =

Venedy
- Village
- Location of Venedy in Washington County, Illinois.
- Coordinates: 38°23′48″N 89°38′44″W
- Country: United States
- State: Illinois
- County: Washington

Area
  - Total: 0.28 sq mi (0.73 km^{2})
  - Land: 0.28 sq mi (0.73 km^{2})
  - Water: 0 sq mi (0.00 km^{2})
- Elevation: 453 ft (138 m)

Population (2020)
  - Total: 121
  - Density: 429.9/sq mi (165.98/km^{2})
- Time zone: UTC-6 (CST)
  - Summer (DST): UTC-5 (CDT)
- ZIP code: 62214
- Area code: 618
- FIPS code: 17-77408
- GNIS ID: 2400053

Venedy is a village in Washington County, Illinois, United States. As of the 2020 census, Venedy had a population of 121.

== Geography ==
According to the 2010 census, Venedy has a total area of 0.29 square miles (0.75 km^{2}), all land.

== Demographics ==
Historical population
Census	Pop.	Note	%±
1880	408		—
1890	193		−52.7%
1900	177		−8.3%
1910	160		−9.6%
1920	157		−1.9%
1930	134		−14.6%
1940	115		−14.2%
1950	149		29.6%
1960	143		−4.0%
1970	155		8.4%
1980	147		−5.2%
1990	158		7.5%
2000	137		−13.3%
2010	138		0.7%
2020	121		−12.3%
U.S. Decennial Census

As of the census of 2000, there were 137 people, 54 households, and 40 families residing in the village. The population density was 479.1 inhabitants per square mile (185.0/km^{2}). There were 60 housing units at an average density of 209.8 per square mile (81.0/km^{2}). The racial makeup of the village was 98.54% White, and 1.46% from two or more races. Hispanic or Latino of any race were 3.65% of the population.

There were 54 households, out of which 38.9% had children under the age of 18 living with them, 68.5% were married couples living together, 5.6% had a female householder with no husband present, and 24.1% were non-families. 24.1% of all households were made up of individuals, and 11.1% had someone living alone who was 65 years of age or older. The average household size was 2.54 and the average family size was 3.00.

In the village, the population was spread out, with 25.5% under the age of 18, 6.6% from 18 to 24, 29.9% from 25 to 44, 23.4% from 45 to 64, and 14.6% who were 65 years of age or older. The median age was 41 years. For every 100 females, there were 101.5 males. For every 100 females age 18 and over, there were 100.0 males.

The median income for a household in the village was $41,389, and the median income for a family was $42,222. Males had a median income of $30,000 versus $26,667 for females. The per capita income for the village was $18,061. There were 2.6% of families and 4.5% of the population living below the poverty line, including 9.7% of under eighteens and none of those over 64.
