= La Grange Park, Illinois =

- Village
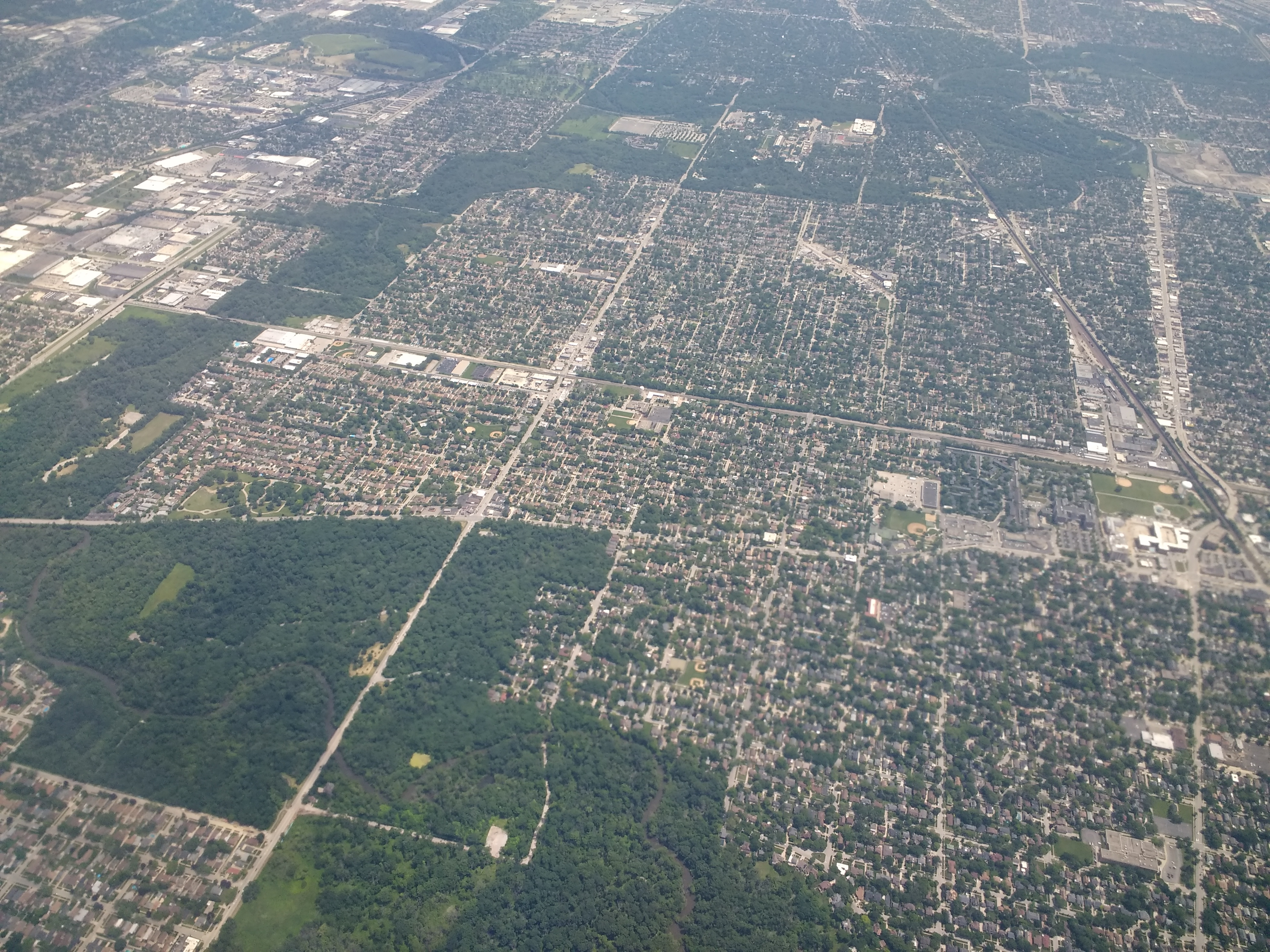
- La Grange Park and neighboring Brookfield

- logo
- Nickname: The LGP
- Motto: "Village of Roses"
- Location of La Grange Park in Cook County, Illinois.

- Location within Greater Chicago Location within Illinois Location within the United States
- Coordinates: 41°49′47″N 87°52′9″W
- Country: United States
- State: Illinois
- County: Cook

Government
  - Type: Council-manager government

Area
  - Total: 2.23 sq mi (5.78 km^{2})
  - Land: 2.23 sq mi (5.78 km^{2})
  - Water: 0 sq mi (0.00 km^{2})

Population (2020)
  - Total: 13,475
  - Density: 6,035.8/sq mi (2,330.45/km^{2})
- Time zone: UTC−6 (CST)
  - Summer (DST): UTC−5 (CDT)
- ZIP Code: 60526
- Area code: 708
- FIPS code: 17-40793
- Website: www.lagrangepark.org

La Grange Park is a village in Cook County, Illinois, United States, about 13 miles (21 km) west-southwest of Chicago. According to the 2020 census, the population was 13,475.

== Geography ==
La Grange Park is located at 41°49′47″N 87°52′9″W (41.829831, -87.869233).

According to the 2021 census gazetteer files, La Grange Park has a total area of 2.23 square miles (5.78 km^{2}), all land.

== Demographics ==
Historical population
Census	Pop.	Note	%±
1900	730		—
1910	1,131		54.9%
1920	1,684		48.9%
1930	2,939		74.5%
1940	3,406		15.9%
1950	6,176		81.3%
1960	13,793		123.3%
1970	15,459		12.1%
1980	13,359		−13.6%
1990	12,861		−3.7%
2000	13,295		3.4%
2010	13,579		2.1%
2020	13,475		−0.8%
U.S. Decennial Census; 2010 2020

=== Racial and ethnic composition ===
La Grange Park village, Illinois – Racial and ethnic composition Note: the US Census treats Hispanic/Latino as an ethnic category. This table excludes Latinos from the racial categories and assigns them to a separate category. Hispanics/Latinos may be of any race.
Race / Ethnicity (NH = Non-Hispanic)	Pop 2000	Pop 2010	Pop 2020	% 2000	% 2010	% 2020
White alone (NH)	12,061	11,671	10,558	90.72%	85.95%	78.35%
Black or African American alone (NH)	399	525	566	3.00%	3.87%	4.20%
Native American or Alaska Native alone (NH)	12	12	13	0.09%	0.09%	0.10%
Asian alone (NH)	217	258	316	1.63%	1.90%	2.35%
Pacific Islander alone (NH)	3	1	2	0.02%	0.01%	0.01%
Other race alone (NH)	19	14	31	0.14%	0.10%	0.23%
Mixed race or Multiracial (NH)	112	169	399	0.84%	1.24%	2.86%
Hispanic or Latino (any race)	472	929	1,590	3.55%	6.84%	11.80%
Total	13,295	13,579	13,475	100.00%	100.00%	100.00%

=== 2020 census ===
As of the 2020 census, La Grange Park had a population of 13,475. The median age was 42.1 years. 24.4% of residents were under the age of 18 and 19.1% were 65 years of age or older. For every 100 females, there were 89.4 males, and for every 100 females age 18 and over, there were 87.0 males age 18 and over.

100.0% of residents lived in urban areas, while 0.0% lived in rural areas.

There were 5,022 households in La Grange Park, of which 35.1% had children under the age of 18 living in them. Of all households, 55.0% were married-couple households, 14.5% were households with a male householder and no spouse or partner present, and 26.1% were households with a female householder and no spouse or partner present. About 26.8% of all households were made up of individuals and 12.6% had someone living alone who was 65 years of age or older.

There were 5,398 housing units, of which 7.0% were vacant. The homeowner vacancy rate was 2.0% and the rental vacancy rate was 8.7%.

=== Demographic estimates ===
The population density was 6,034.48 inhabitants per square mile (2,329.93/km^{2}). Housing-unit density was 2,417.38 per square mile (933.36/km^{2}). Estimates also report that 27.27% of households were non-families, the average household size was 3.18, and the average family size was 2.62. Additional age-group estimates report that 5.6% of residents were from 18 to 24, 23.7% were from 25 to 44, and 25.3% were from 45 to 64.

=== Income and poverty ===
The median income for a household in the village was $107,945, and the median income for a family was $136,211. Males had a median income of $76,622 versus $55,700 for females. The per capita income for the village was $49,794. About 3.6% of families and 5.1% of the population were below the poverty line, including 4.8% of those under age 18 and 8.0% of those age 65 or over.

== Government ==
La Grange Park is in Illinois's 4th and 7th congressional districts.

The part-time Village President is James Discipio. He is a dentist by trade and practices in Berwyn, Illinois.

== Education ==
Public school districts in LaGrange Park include LaGrange Elementary School District 102, Brookfield-LaGrange Park School District 95, and Lyons Township High School District 204. The Roman Catholic Archdiocese of Chicago operates Catholic schools. St. Louise de Marillac School is in LaGrange Park. The student population from circa 2019 to 2020 declined by 28. The archdiocese asked if there were interested benefactors, but the archdiocese was unsuccessful. Therefore, the archdiocese decided it will close after spring 2020.

Nazareth Academy is a Roman Catholic college-preparatory high school located in LaGrange Park, Illinois, United States, in the Roman Catholic Archdiocese of Chicago. It was founded in 1900 by the Sisters of St. Joseph.

== Transportation ==
Pace provides bus service on routes 330 and 331 connecting La Grange Park to destinations across the region.

== Notable people ==
- Allan B. Calhamer, mail carrier and game maker, invented the board game Diplomacy; grew up in La Grange Park
- Kathleen Doyle, Basketball player at the University of Iowa (2016–2020); Big Ten Player of the Year in 2020. Also a silver medalist with the US national team at the 2019 Pan American Games. WNBA draftee as 14th overall pick by Indiana Fever. Grew up in La Grange Park.
- Earl Eisenhower, Illinois state representative and brother of Dwight D. Eisenhower; lived in La Grange Park
- Nick Fuentes, white supremacist, white nationalist, right-wing political commentator and activist. Leader of the Groypers
- J. J. McCarthy, New York Giants quarterback. Born and raised in La Grange Park, attended and played football at Nazareth Academy.
