= Jeanne Hurley Simon =

American public official (1922–2000)

Chair of the National Commission on Libraries & Information Science
- In office 1993–2000
- President: Bill Clinton
- Preceded by: J. Michael Farrell
- Succeeded by: Martha B. Gould

Second Lady of Illinois
- In office January 13, 1969 – January 8, 1973
- Preceded by: Eva Richolson (1961)
- Succeeded by: Marge Dunne

Member of the Illinois House of Representatives from the 7th district
- In office 1957–1961
- Preceded by: Joseph J. Lelivelt
- Succeeded by: Robert Marks

Personal details
- Born: May 10, 1922 Chicago, Illinois, U.S.
- Died: February 20, 2000 (aged 77) Makanda, Illinois, U.S.
- Party: Democratic
- Spouse: Paul Simon (m. 1960)
- Education: Barat College (B.A.); Northwestern University (J.D.)
- Profession: Attorney; Author

Jeanne C. Hurley Simon (May 10, 1922 – February 20, 2000) was the first wife of Senator Paul Simon and the mother of former Illinois Lieutenant Governor Sheila Simon, was a state and national public official in her own right.

== Early life and career ==
Born in Chicago, Illinois, Simon moved to Chicago's North Shore, graduating from New Trier High School. She then attended Barat College. After receiving her Bachelor of Arts, she attended law school at Northwestern University School of Law. She was admitted to the Illinois bar and practiced law including work as a Cook County Assistant State's Attorney.

== Illinois House of Representatives ==
A member of the Illinois House of Representatives from 1957 to 1961. A supporter of the Civil Rights Movement, Hurley was a member of the Catholic Interracial Council and the NAACP. On April 21, 1960 she married fellow State Assemblyman Paul Simon, thus becoming the first two sitting members of that body who were married to each other. She did not seek reelection, later becoming a mother to Sheila and Martin Simon, a lawyer, an author, and supporting her husband when he served as the state's lieutenant governor from 1969 to 1973, during his failed gubernatorial bid in 1972, and his terms as congressman and United States Senator until 1997.

== Later career ==
In recognition of her lifelong advocacy of libraries and literacy, President Bill Clinton appointed her in 1993 and 1997 to two terms as chairperson of the National Commission on Libraries and Information Science.

In 1995 she was speaker at the Elizabeth W. Stone Lecture series on "The Role of the National Commission on Libraries and Information Science in American Library Development."

She was awarded American Library Association Honorary Membership in 2000.

She served on the National Commission on Libraries and Information Science until her death from brain cancer on February 20, 2000, at the age of 77, at her home, in Makanda, Illinois.

A decade after her death, her daughter Sheila became Lieutenant Governor of Illinois.
