= Henry Klosak =

American politician (1925–1992)

Member of the Illinois House of Representatives

Personal details
- Born: Henry J. Klosak; November 7, 1925
- Died: December 28, 1992 (aged 67)
- Party: Republican
- Children: 4
- Education: DePaul University
- Occupation: Politician, judge

Military service
- Allegiance: United States
- Branch/service: United States Coast Guard
- Battles/wars: World War II

Henry J. Klosak (November 7, 1925 – December 28, 1992) was an American politician who served as a Republican member of the Illinois House of Representatives and the Village President of Cicero, Illinois.

Klosak was born November 7, 1925. He attended St. Mary's Elementary School and J. S. Morton High School in Cicero. He then attended DePaul University College of Law in Chicago. He served with United States Coast Guard in South Pacific and Africa during World War II. He later became a Justice of the Peace and Magistrate of Circuit Court of Cook County. He was elected in 1966 and served until he became Village President of Cicero in 1980. He was an opponent of the Equal Rights Amendment while in the House. He was married with four children. He died December 28, 1992.

== See also ==
- List of town presidents of Cicero, Illinois
