= Frances L. Dawson =

American educator and politician

Member of the Illinois House of Representatives

Personal details
- Party: Republican

Frances Ledlie Dawson (December 23, 1903 – August 20, 1995) was an American educator and politician.

Dawson was born in Des Moines, Iowa. She received her bachelor's degree from Simpson College and her master's degree from Northwestern University. Dawson lived with her husband Horace Dawson and their family in Evanston, Illinois since 1929. She taught history and political science. Dawson served on the Evanston High School Board of Education and the Evanston Planning Commission. Dawson served in the Illinois House of Representatives from 1957 to 1971 and was a Republican. Dawson died at the Presbyterian Home in Evanston, Illinois.
