= J. Sterling Morton High School District 201 =

Public school district in Cook County, Illinois, USA

Location
- 5801 W. Cermak Rd. Cicero, Illinois

District information
- Type: Public Secondary District
- Established: 1890s
- Superintendent: Dr. Michael Kuzniewski

Students and staff
- Enrollment: 7,945
- Colors: Maroon, Gray and White

Other information
- Website: www.morton201.org

J. Sterling Morton High School District 201 is a school district headquartered in Cicero, Illinois, United States. The district serves the town of Cicero, the city of Berwyn and the villages of Lyons, Stickney, and Forest View. A small section of McCook also lies within the district boundaries. The school district is named after Julius Sterling Morton, Grover Cleveland's Secretary of Agriculture during his second term, who is best known for founding Arbor Day. The district and its schools are named after Morton because he was friends with Cicero resident and fur trader Portus Baxter Weare.

The district competes in Illinois High School Association athletics as a unified school with the shortened name "Berwyn-Cicero (Morton)".

== Schools ==
The district is composed of four campuses:

- Morton East High School in Cicero, opened in 1894
- Morton West High School in Berwyn, opened in 1958
  - Morton West Freshman Academy in Berwyn, opened in 2019 (Located within Morton West High School)
- Morton Freshman Center in Cicero, opened in 2004
- Morton Alternative Center in Cicero, opened in 2007

Students living west of Ridgeland Avenue are zoned to Morton West while those living east of Ridgeland Avenue are zoned to Morton East. Areas west of Ridgeland Avenue include most of Berwyn, Stickney, Forest View, and Lyons, while areas east of Ridgeland Avenue include Cicero and a portion of Berwyn.

== Feeder school districts ==
- Cicero Elementary School District 99
- Lyons School District 103
- Berwyn North School District 98
- South Berwyn School District 100

== History ==
In 1892, there were reports that the town of Cicero was beginning to work to consolidate a school district that would include the then current Morton Park and Hawthorne District with one consisting of the towns of Clyde and LaVergne, to create what was called a "High School Department".

Cicero-Stickney Township High School (with "Clyde P.O.") was established as a township high school district in 1898 with 4 teachers and 44 students. By the 1903–1904 school year, it was one of the 33 township high school districts in Illinois, and had 10 teachers and 130 students, with 8 students graduating that year. The principal for the 1904–1905 school year was H. V. Church.

Berwyn is in the district because it had not yet been created out of Cicero when the district was formed. A portion of Stickney is in the district because state law at the time required a township high school district to comprise parts of two or more townships. Lyons was annexed to the district by public petition in 1920. By then, the name "J. Sterling Morton High School" was already in use for the high school, though the legal name was "Cicero-Stickney Township High School".

In 1922, High School District 201 issued building bonds for $250,000.

=== 1930s ===
By 1931, Morton had reached its capacity of 3,000 students, and a bond issue was put before the electorate to raise funds for a new school to be built in neighboring Berwyn. The issue was defeated 7751–8035.

In May 1932, the school district closed the school two weeks ahead of schedule because of financial troubles. The school also announced that the autumn opening of school would be pushed back two weeks to further save money. The closing also affected Morton Junior College, which was housed at the school.

The 1932–33 school year saw teachers and students join in an unusual revolt against the board of education. In October 1932, the school's football coach was fired without warning, prompting 800 citizens to attend a board meeting to retain him. The coach was reputedly fired for being critical of the board for discounting tax warrants with which teachers had been paid over the past months in lieu of money. About one month later, students began a boycott of the cafeteria, charging that not only had prices gone up, but that workers had been fired to be replaced by more workers with ties to the school board. The board then hired private individuals to patrol the school.

The publicity surrounding these actions prompted the accrediting agency for the school, the North Central Association of Colleges and Schools, to begin an inquiry as to whether the school should remain accredited. This was immediately followed by the North Central Association's assertion that, despite teachers receiving no cash salary for almost a year, and being forced to sell the tax warrants they had been receiving for substantial discounts, the board had hired unnecessary custodial staff, cafeteria workers, and largely under-qualified teachers without consulting the superintendent.

The situation reached a head when Harry V. Church, the school's superintendent, announced that he too was joining the student-faculty revolt, and would inform the state's attorney of what he knew, including the hiring of teachers sponsored by the board over his objections, a US$3.5 million debt run up by the board, and the specific names of employees that had been hired who were relatives of board members. Despite a direct threat of removal from the school board president, the superintendent demoted the head of the physical welfare department, who had been instrumental in firing the football coach who had drawn attention to the school problems.

A group of thirteen civic groups, headed by the local Rotary Club, concluded their own investigation. The demands in regards for drawing up a budget were voted on by the board, but no action was taken. When the superintendent and an independent auditor asked to examine the financial information for the district, they were refused on the grounds that the financial officer "couldn't do much without two office employees, who are ill". One of the employees named was the daughter of the board president. On December 12, the secretary of the North Central Association read a letter at the public meeting of the board stating "The standards of the school are very shaky.". When a taxpayers' group asked for the board to request that the State's Attorney begin an inquiry, a board member responded that the "state's attorney hasn't time to bother about such small matters."

In January, the superintendent was dismissed after a taxpayers' group lobbied for his removal. This prompted the Berwyn Ministers' Association to call a meeting attended by 2,500 residents to demand an open hearing on the ousted superintendent. At that meeting, the secretary of the North Central Association spoke out in favor of the former superintendent, and stated that the board's inability to set a budget and to engage in politically motivated hiring practices would lower the accreditation rating of the school. Despite adopting a budget for the remainder of the school year, new charges against the board surfaced. The parent-teacher association began a petition to submit to the governor requesting the removal of the board, amongst allegations that similarly worded and appearing petitions were being circulated to gain praise for the board.

On the evening of February 2, a 20-foot-tall (6.1 m) burning cross was found on the athletic field. At a board meeting in March, a citizen identified himself as a member of the Ku Klux Klan, and informed the board that "As an organization we are watching developments ..."

The interim superintendent recommended immediate austerity measures, punctuated by a reduction in staffing, including the elimination of 20 of the 40 office clerks, several custodial personnel, and the elimination of all teacher-clerks (permanent substitute teachers). The board was also forced to deal with being voted out of the Suburban League. As a result of the actions at Morton, the (pre-union) National Education Association's department of secondary school principals censured the board, and called for new laws that would prevent similar abuses in the future.

Later in March, the board secretly selected a new superintendent and principal, despite a recommendation from the North Central Association that a list of educators form a search committee. By this time, results of inquiries into the finances of the district had been hampered by the disappearance of the district's financial officer. When it was determined that the controller had taken money from the school's petty cash, leaving an IOU, the board requested, and received, a warrant for his arrest. His successor also found that US$9,500 in tax warrants were missing, one of which was traced to a local grocer who had received it from the missing controller to pay a debt. The controller surrendered himself, and paid bail, claiming he had been suffering from a nervous breakdown brought on by the recent problems; he denied stealing from the school.

The April school board election saw two new members elected to the board, with one of them becoming the new president. In the wake of the election, the North Central Association delivered a formal warning to the school, stating that while it would remain accredited, the warning was a formality required as a prelude to losing accreditation, should it be deemed necessary in a year's time. The new board followed through on a recommendation from the North Central Association, and took the recommendation of a committee of 33 educators to hire a professor of education from South Dakota to become the new permanent superintendent, L. M. Hrudka.

By 1934, the district was back on a cash-paying basis. By 1936, the school population had reached 6,000. The firing of three maintenance workers in December 1936 at the school prompted a strike of the 40 unionized members of the custodial staff. The picket line blocked the delivery of coal to the school, forcing it to remain closed as there was only a limited stockpile available for heating. The board retaliated by firing thirty more maintenance workers, with the caveat they could reapply for their jobs within three days. A local painter who had helped maintain the furnaces in the absence of maintenance staff was beaten near the school.

As the coal supplies dwindled, the state's attorney called for mediation, and the sides met on January 8. When talks were unsuccessful, school officials arranged for police to guard deliveries of coal to the school. Three of the drivers who had made the coal deliveries, a man and his two sons, were run off the road and beaten in retaliation.

Municipal officials began to ask for greater effort to end the strike. One board member resigned a key position in his church after the pastor spoke out against school officials. The Illinois Department of Labor issued subpoenas for school officials to appear at a conference arranged to settle the strike. An agreement was ratified by both sides on January 24, with all but four strikers returning to work, and the original fired maintenance staff guaranteed a hearing with "good prospects of reinstatement".

In 1938, L. M. Hrudka was dismissed as superintendent, despite a year remaining on his contract, following concerns raised by the North Central Association that he was not cooperating properly with the faculty. However, the secretary of the board, publicly declaring the firing as a "colossal piece of trickery", refused to notify the administrator of his dismissal, and claimed the vote was illegal since it occurred after the board had adjourned. The board claimed that Hrudka had been a factor in the North Central Association downgrading the school's rating.

In March 1939, the Illinois state committee of the North Central Association, citing political interference and a lack of leadership, informed the school that it would be recommending that it lose accreditation, invalidating current and future student credits toward college admission. While preparing to defend itself against these charges, the board settled a lawsuit filed by fired superintendent Hrudka for the full amount of his remaining contract. An investigation by the North Central Association resulted in the school again being put on one year's notice to improve standards or risk losing accreditation.

=== 1950s to 1960s ===
While the 1940s had been relatively quiet, 1952 saw the joint resignation of the superintendent and business manager over what was described as "personal quarreling". At the meeting where the resignations were accepted, a citizen denounced the board president, Edward Chodl. Chodl then "ran toward (him), but was restrained by other board members." The pair were guaranteed to be paid their combined $23,740 contracts for the next year, with the outgoing superintendent given an additional $8,000 to rent his educational film library for ten years.

In the autumn of 1969, a teacher's strike was called at the school for the first time in its history. One teacher was arrested for using his picket sign as a weapon against a school board member. In response, the West Suburban Teachers' Union, which represented eleven school districts, asked for all of its members to take an emergency personal day and join in protesting a back to work order issued by a judge, and what were termed as "union busting" tactics by the Morton school board. The strike lasted 22 days. In November, the striking teachers were charged individually with contempt of court. 64 teachers were found guilty and sentenced to ten days in prison and a $100 fine. In the end, the president of the union, a Morton East teacher, was fined $1,000 and sentenced to 20 days in jail for contempt.

=== 1980s ===
Morton West and Morton East high schools went into the same school district in the 1985–1986 school year.

=== 2000s to present ===
Morton High School District 201 has drastically expanded learning opportunities. Morton continues to enhance the many activities that support students’ learning such as Tapestry, Credit Recovery Program, and the Freshmen Mentoring Program. Several support programs such as Coaching Centers, Student Intervention Teams, and the Technology Support Internship make the education process a seamless one. Morton High School District 201 released a new grading system in 2014, which ensures that all parties are held accountable for the academic success of students and allows teachers to hold students to the highest standards. District 201 actively engages parents and community members. The district actively supports the Parent Teacher Organization and Parent Teacher Association, which helps with several community events throughout the school year, including coordinating a series of annual anti-bullying events. Parent liaisons at all campuses get parents involved in school and community events and hold monthly principal meetings to receive community feedback. Throughout the year counselors host a series of college nights explaining the college application and financial aid process to parents. District 201 has worked to provide safe and well maintained schools to enhance learning for all students. In 2014, the main school entrances were remodeled to provide control of all individuals entering school grounds. Also in 2014, the Board of Education inaugurated the new Morton Stadium which includes a new field, concession stand, and an 8 lane track, among several facility upgrades. In 2014, District 201 upgraded the Morton West pool room lighting with energy efficient lights and updated the ceiling, windows and paint. The Morton West cafeteria was also renovated and expanded over the summer of 2014. In 2014 the old Morton East pool was finally renovated into an expanded classroom. In 2015, six chemistry labs in Morton East and West will be renovated. Renovations are expected for the culinary arts room as well. The 1:1 program was officially launched in 2014. In 2014 all incoming freshmen were given a Dell lap top device. District 201 will continue roll out the distribution and use of laptops for all incoming freshmen classes. In 2014 a new interactive white board was installed in all classrooms throughout the district to support the 1:1 program. District 201 continues to improve district-wide technology infrastructure with an increase to district wide bandwidth. This increase in bandwidth allows students to take advantage of the 1:1 program. In 2014, District 201 had its 5th consecutive balanced budget. On this same year, District 201 also received the Association of School Business Officials International's (ASBO) Certificate of Excellence in Financial Reporting Award for having met or exceeded the program's high standards for financial reporting and accountability. The district was recognized for its Comprehensive Annual Financial Report for the fiscal year ending 2013. A Comprehensive Annual Financial Report (CAFR) is a set of financial statements that provide a thorough and detailed presentation of a school district's financial condition and goes beyond the minimum information necessary for fair presentation in conformity with Generally Accepted Accounting Principles (GAAP).
