= One Hope United =

U.S. non-profit organization

- Formation: 1895
- Headquarters: Chicago, Illinois
- President & CEO: Dr. Damon Cates
- Website: onehopeunited.org

One Hope United (OHU) is a nonprofit organization founded in 1895 that provides child welfare, early childhood education, behavioral health, and residential services in Florida and Illinois. The organization is headquartered in Chicago, Illinois.

== History ==
One Hope United was founded on October 8, 1895, in Downers Grove, Illinois, under the name Chicago Baptist Orphanage. The organization initially operated an orphanage for children and, by 1913, had expanded to four orphanages located in Downers Grove, Berwyn, Chicago, and Maywood.

Over time, the organization transitioned from institutional orphan care to a broader service model that includes foster care, family services, and behavioral health programs.

Prior to adopting its current name, the organization operated as Central Baptist Children’s Home and later Kids Hope United. The name One Hope United was adopted in 2010.

In May 2024, Damon Cates was appointed President and Chief Executive Officer after serving in an interim capacity beginning in September 2023. Prior to his appointment, Cates served as the organization’s Chief Advancement Officer.

== Programs and services ==
One Hope United provides a range of services related to child welfare and family support, including:

- Early childhood education and child development centers
- Foster care and adoption services
- Family and youth support programs
- Behavioral and mental health services
- Residential care and group home programs
- Crisis assessment and intervention services

=== Hope Houses ===
Hope Houses is a residential care model operated by One Hope United for adolescents involved with the child welfare system, including youth with juvenile justice involvement. The program utilizes small, family-style homes rather than larger institutional group care settings.

Hope Houses emphasize consistent adult supervision and supportive services intended to assist youth with daily living skills, education, and behavioral health needs.

=== Geographic reach ===
As of the mid-2020s, One Hope United operates programs in Florida and Illinois. The organization has operated Hope Houses in Florida since 2020 and expanded the model to Illinois with the opening of its first location in Rockford in 2025.

== Operations ==
According to publicly available nonprofit filings, One Hope United serves more than 10,000 children and families annually through its combined programs.
