= J. Sterling Morton High School East =

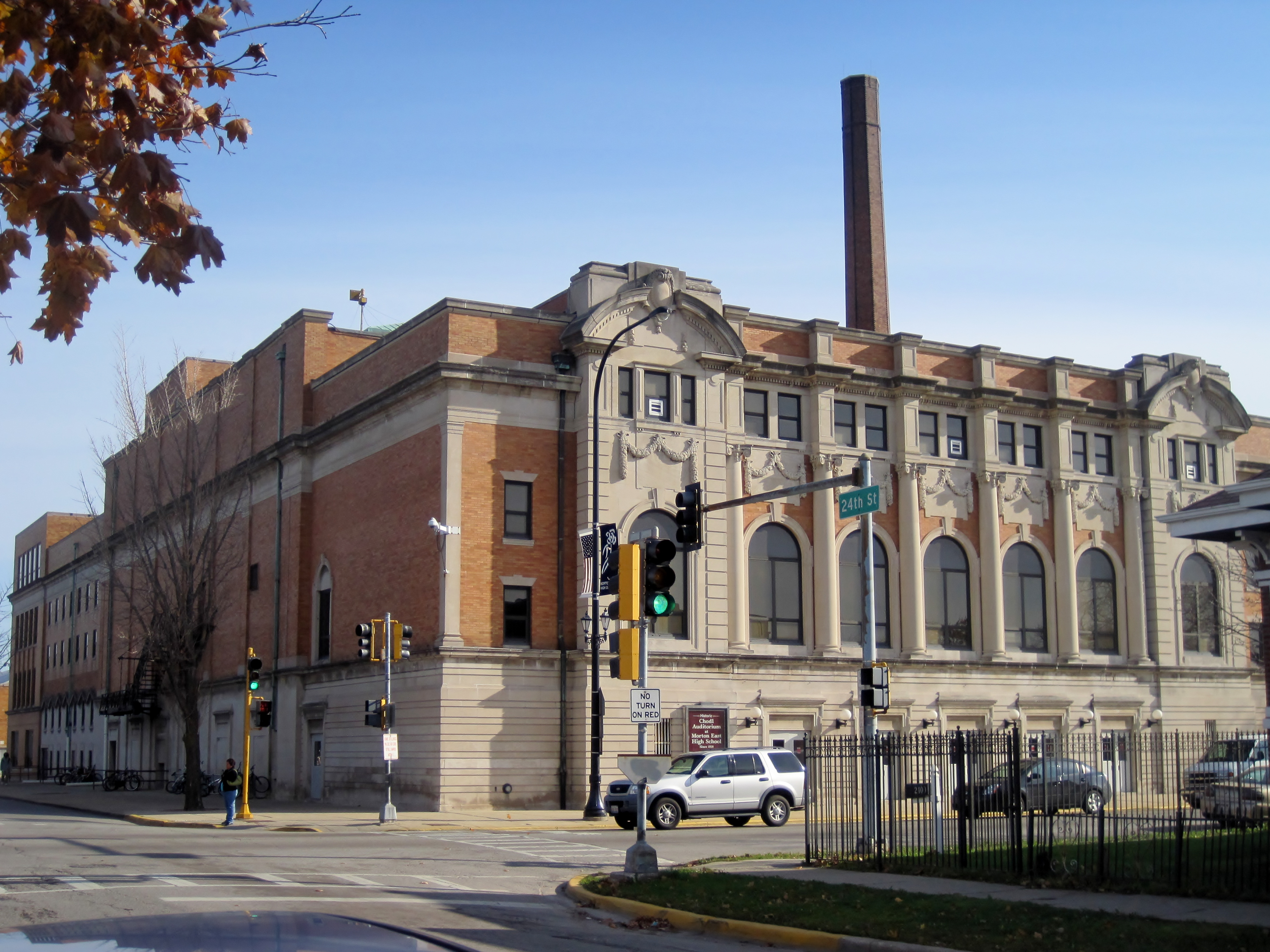

Location
- 2423 S. Austin Blvd. Cicero, Illinois 60804; United States; 41.846°N 87.772°W

Information
- School type: public secondary
- Opened: 1894
- Status: Open
- School district: J. Sterling Morton HS Dist. 201
- Principal: Jose Gamboa
- Faculty: 183
- Teaching staff: 185.00 (FTE)
- Grades: 10–12
- Gender: coed
- Enrollment: 3,394 (2024–2025)
- Average class size: 23.0
- Student to teacher ratio: 18.35
- Colors: Maroon, Gray, and White
- Athletics conference: West Suburban Conference
- Mascot: Mustangs
- Nickname: Mustangs
- Website: mortoneast.morton201.org

J. Sterling Morton High School East (often called Morton East; formerly Morton High School) is a public secondary school located in Cicero, Illinois. Morton East is one of three schools in J. Sterling Morton High School District 201. Morton East is a sophomore through senior building, with future students attending the J. Sterling Morton Freshman Center for one year. Morton East's sister school, J. Sterling Morton High School West is a four-year secondary school.

From 1920 to 1959, the school operated as Morton High School, changing its name when Morton West opened.

The district and its schools are named after Julius Sterling Morton because he was friends with Cicero resident and fur trader Portus Baxter Weare.

In the high school district students living east of Ridgeland Avenue are zoned to Morton East; areas east of Ridgeland Avenue include Cicero and a small portion of Berwyn. There are small sections of Stickney and Forest View, but no Stickney residents live in that section.

== History ==
In 1892, there were reports that the town of Cicero was beginning to work to consolidate a school district that would include the current Morton Park and Hawthorne district with one consisting of the towns of Clyde and LaVergne, for means of adding what was called a "High School Department".

Though only seven miles from downtown Chicago, the school, in its early history was situated on prairie and farmland. In 1915, the Chicago Tribune reported that Professor H.V. Church, then the principal of J. S. Morton, was forced to walk his cow nine miles from Berwyn to the docks at Rush Street so that he and his family might have nourishment at their summer farm in Michigan, where they stayed the summer. The article noted that the principal was "following the example of the mayor".

More than 20 students were expelled in June 1916, after a lemon throwing incident which started in the evening of a school play, escalated into fighting in the school cafeteria the next day. That 1916 graduating class was reported to consist of 29 students graduating from "academic courses", 24 in "shorthand", and 8 in "bookkeeping".

By 1917, the events of World War I were having an effect on the school. Students began raising vegetables on a six-acre plot of land adjacent to the school in order to supply produce for the school lunch room in the autumn. The six-acre garden was so consuming that the school withdrew their baseball team from the league they had been playing in to "devote (their) energies to the garden".

At some point in the 1920s, the school began moving to a split schedule, with freshmen attending in the morning, and upperclassmen attending in the afternoon. This practice would continue until the opening of Morton West in 1958.

In 1924, during a basketball game in the school's gym, a major fire erupted which caused US$900,000 in damage. The auditorium, girls' gymnasium, library, and several classrooms and offices were lost. The fire forced the school to temporarily move to a split schedule, with the 1,200 freshmen attending classes from 8–12:30 during the day, and the upperclassmen to attending classes from 12:30–5.

Cicero's more infamous claim to fame is its association with former resident Al Capone. In at least one instance in 1930, Capone was known to attend a football game at the school "still surrounded by his bodyguard of six".

Rather than receiving standard diplomas, the 1,045 graduates of the class of 1938 were each given pocket sized diplomas so that they may could be "conveniently displayed to prospective employers".

In 1950, a major reconstruction began at the school. The five old frame structures were demolished to make way for brick structures, including two gymnasiums, an auto shop, a greenhouse, two libraries, a band room, a typesetting room, and over 100 other rooms. The expansion was not only in response to the increase in student population, which had already prompted preparations for building a second school, but that the older buildings were considered a safety hazard. The addition was completed in April 1952.

By the spring of 1956, construction had begun on what was to become Morton West High School. The school would open in 1958 reducing the population congestion in the school. The graduation of the class of 1956 included a commencement address by the visiting mayor of Kansas City, Missouri, Harold Roe Bartle.

In 1963, a US$400,000 upgrade to the main library was completed, including new data processing equipment, including equipment that would create and read punch cards.

In 1966, Morton East's student government sponsored a performance by the Chad Mitchell Trio, which at the time included a relatively unknown John Denver.

== Campus and architecture ==
The school houses the collection of the Cicero Historical Society.

The school's Chodl Auditorium was added to the National Register of Historic Places in 1983. It is one of the largest non-commercial proscenium style theaters in the Chicago metropolitan area.

== Academics ==
Morton East's class of 2008 had an average composite ACT score of 16.8. 70.3% of the senior class graduated. Morton East did not make Adequate Yearly Progress (AYP) on the Prairie State Achievement Examination, which with the ACT comprises the state assessments used to fulfill the federal No Child Left Behind Act. Neither the school overall, nor any of its three student subgroups met expectations in reading or mathematics. In addition, the school overall, and one of its student subgroups failed to meet minimum expectations in terms of graduation rates. As of 2009 school was listed as being in its fifth academic year.

Some time prior to or during 2009 the school hired a "High Schools That Work" consultant that, along with the leader of the school's science department, gave instruction to science teachers on how to teach classes. Marge Scherer, author of Challenging the Whole Child: Reflections on Best Practices in Learning, Teaching and Leadership, wrote that the school decided to "reject" the demographics of the school, considered disadvantaged, "as an excuse for low science scores."

In the year 2015, J. Sterling Morton High School District 201 was named the national leader among medium-sized school districts in expanding access to Advanced Placement courses while improving AP exam performance. According to three years of AP data analysis, the number of Morton students enrolled in AP courses has gone up by 98% since 2011. Furthermore, there's been a 68% increase in the percentage of students scoring high enough to earn college credit. More than 2,350 students were enrolled in AP classes that year.

== Student body ==
As of 2009 70% of the students at Morton were from low-income backgrounds and 94% were Hispanic and Latino.

== Athletics ==
Since 1985, the schools have operated a unified athletics program under the name Berwyn-Cicero (Morton). Prior to this, Morton East competed as a separate school. Prior to the 1960–61 school year, the school was the only school in the district, and competed as Morton High School. Morton competes in the West Suburban Conference. Morton is also a member of the Illinois High School Association (IHSA) which governs most sports and competitive activities in the state. Teams are stylized as the Mustangs. When Morton East (and prior to that, Morton High School) competed independently, the school's teams were stylized as the Mustangs, but used school colors of maroon and white.

The school sponsors interscholastic teams for young men and women in: basketball, cross country, golf, gymnastics, soccer, swimming & diving, tennis, track & field, volleyball, and water polo. Young men may compete in baseball, football, and wrestling, while young women may compete in badminton, bowling, Poms, cheerleading, and softball.

The following teams have finished in the top four of their respective IHSA sponsored state championship tournaments or meets:

- Baseball: State Champions (1942–43, 1951–52, 1960–61, 1969–70)
- Basketball (boys): 4th place (1941–42); State Champions (1931–32, 1940–41)
- Gymnastics (girls): 4th place (1981–82); 3rd place (1979–80, 1980–81)
- Soccer (boys): State Champions (2011–12); 4th place (2006–07, 2021–22); 2nd place (1973–74, 2019–20); 3rd place (2015–16)
- Softball: State Champions (1985–86)
- Tennis (boys): 4th place (1947–48)
- Track & Field (boys): 3rd place (1938–39)

In 1927, Morton's boys' basketball team won the "Interscholastic Championship of the United States". The meet had been organized at the University of Chicago by Amos Alonzo Stagg.

In 1941, the school hosted an amateur boxing night which featured Barney Ross, Johnny Coulon, and Battling Nelson (all former world champions) as referees.

In November 1968, the school was to host exhibition matches with the Poland men's national volleyball team and Poland women's national volleyball team, however the teams were denied entry into the United States because of Poland's involvement in the Warsaw Pact invasion of Czechoslovakia.

Between 1983 and 1985, the Chicago Bears intermittently used Morton East for an indoor training facility, including their Super Bowl XX championship season.

== Notable alumni ==
- Harold R. Collier was a United States Congressman (1954–75)
- Lu Gambino was a running back (1948–49) with the Baltimore Colts of the All-America Football Conference
- Bill Hapac was an All-American basketball star at Illinois in 1940 and would later play professionally for the Chicago Bruins
- Dave Kocourek was a tight end in the American Football League (1960–68), playing most of his career for the Los Angeles/San Diego Chargers. A four time all-star, he was the only player to appear in seven AFL championship games
- John Kriza was a ballet dancer and a longtime principal dancer with the American Ballet Theatre
- Joe Mantegna is a Tony Award-winning actor (Glengarry Glen Ross) also known for his work in film (The Godfather Part III) and television (Criminal Minds and voice of Fat Tony on The Simpsons)
- Carmen Mauro was a Major League Baseball outfielder (1948, 1950–51, 1953)
- Bob Miller was a Major League Baseball pitcher (1953–62), played primarily for Detroit Tigers
- Ron Miller was an NFL quarterback (1962) for the Los Angeles Rams
- Arthur C. Nielsen Sr. was the founder of ACNielsen a research marketing company best known for the Nielsen ratings for television
- Jim Robinson, posthumous recipient of the Medal of Honor in 1966
- Miro Rys was a soccer player who played for the United States men's national soccer team and for the Chicago Sting of the NASL
- Erika Sánchez is an American poet and writer, known for her young adult novel I Am Not Your Perfect Mexican Daughter.
- Clarence Self was an NFL running back (1949–55)
- Grover C. Stephens was a leading physiologist and marine scientist at the University of Minnesota and University of California, Irvine
- Bob Will was a Major League Baseball outfielder (1957–63), playing his entire career for the Chicago Cubs
