= Vraz =

Vraz is a surname. Notable people with the surname include:

- Stanko Vraz (1810–1851), Slovene-Croatian poet
- Vlasta Vraz (1900–1989), Czech American relief worker
