= Berwyn North School District 98 =

School district in Illinois

Address
- 6633 16th Street Berwyn, Illinois, 60402; United States

District information
- Type: Public
- Grades: PreK–8
- NCES District ID: 1706060

Students and staff
- Students: 2,708

Other information
- Website: www.bn98.org

Berwyn North School District 98 is a school district headquartered in Berwyn, Illinois, United States.

The district serves the northern half of Berwyn.

Residents move on to J. Sterling Morton High School West of the J. Sterling Morton High School District 201 after completion of the 8th grade.

== Schools ==
=== Secondary Schools ===
- Lincoln Middle School (6-8)

=== Primary schools ===
- Havlicek Elementary School (K-5)
- Jefferson Elementary School (K-5)
- Prairie Oak Elementary School (K-5)

== See also ==
- List of school districts in Illinois
