= Clarence Self =

American football player (1925–2012)

No. 37, 11, 28
- Positions: Defensive back, halfback

Personal information
- Born: October 25, 1925; Birmingham, Alabama, U.S.
- Died: January 21, 2012 (aged 86); Elburn, Illinois, U.S.
- Listed height: 5 ft 8 in (1.73 m)
- Listed weight: 181 lb (82 kg)

Career information
- High school: Sterling (Cicero, Illinois)
- College: Wisconsin
- NFL draft: 1948: 12th round, 105th overall pick

Career history
- Chicago Cardinals (1949); Detroit Lions (1950–1951); Green Bay Packers (1952, 1954–1955)

Career NFL statistics
- Rushing yards: 46
- Rushing average: 6.6
- Receptions: 1
- Receiving yards: 12
- Interceptions: 7
- Total touchdowns: 1
- Stats at Pro Football Reference

Clarence Elbert Self (October 25, 1925 – January 21, 2012) was a professional American football defensive back and halfback who played in the National Football League (NFL). He played six seasons for the Chicago Cardinals (1949), Detroit Lions (1950–1951), and Green Bay Packers (1952, 1954–1955).
