= School District 99 =

School District 99 may refer to:

- Christopher School District 99
- Cicero Public School District 99
- Community High School District 99 (DuPage County, Illinois)
- Nashville Community High School District 99
- Spring Valley Elementary School District 99
