= Berwyn Apartments =

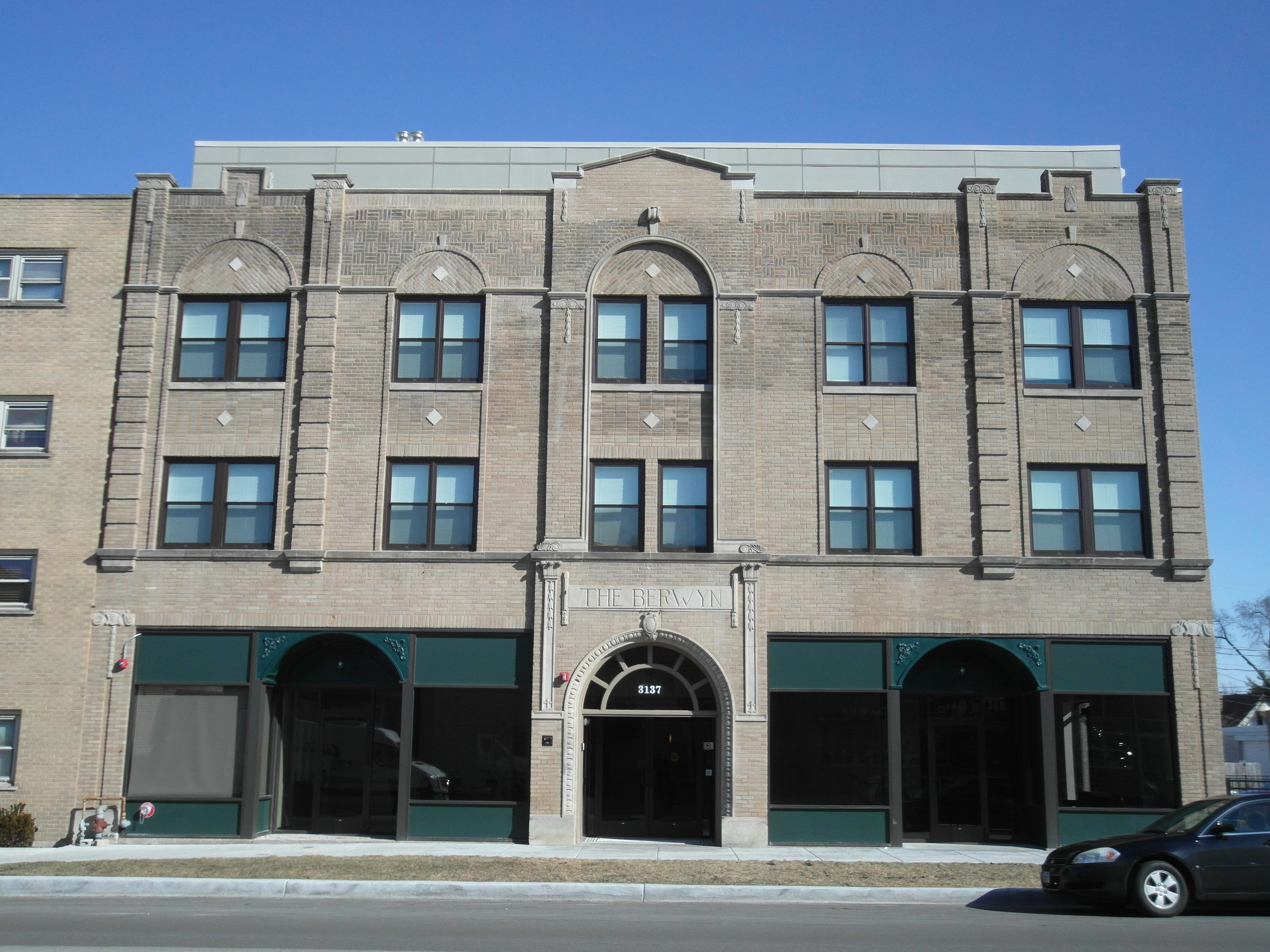

General information
- Location: 3137 Oak Park Avenue, Berwyn, Illinois
- Coordinates: 41°50′04.5″N 87°47′33.6″W
- Completed: 1922
- Opened: 1923

Technical details
- Floor count: 4

Website
- www.liveatberwyn.com

The Berwyn Apartments is an apartment building at 3137 Oak Park Avenue, Berwyn, Illinois. Originally the Berwyn Hotel, the building was built in 1922, at a cost of $200,000 ($3,757,058 in today's dollars). 210 guests attended a dinner-dance marking its opening in 1923. The local Kiwanis and Lions clubs held events in the hotel, as did political parties and candidates. The hotel also contained an elegant tea room and had a cigar stand in the lobby. The Berwyn Conservatory of Music held concerts in the lobby. An addition was built in 1929, at a cost of $25,000.

Originally owned by Frank Euwecke, in 1943 it was purchased by Chicago attorney Maxwell Landis. After Landis's death, ownership passed to his widow and later to his son, Floyd Landis. In 1972, it was sold to the Berwyn Hotel Corp. In 1977, it was purchased by James and Noreen Bushouse. The Bushouses renovated the building, creating 46 guest rooms, ten residential suites, and space for three commercial tenants on the first floor. The building was renovated in 2018, creating 28 one and two bedroom apartment units, and a fourth floor addition was built.
