= Allan Cox (author) =

American business writer (1937–2016)

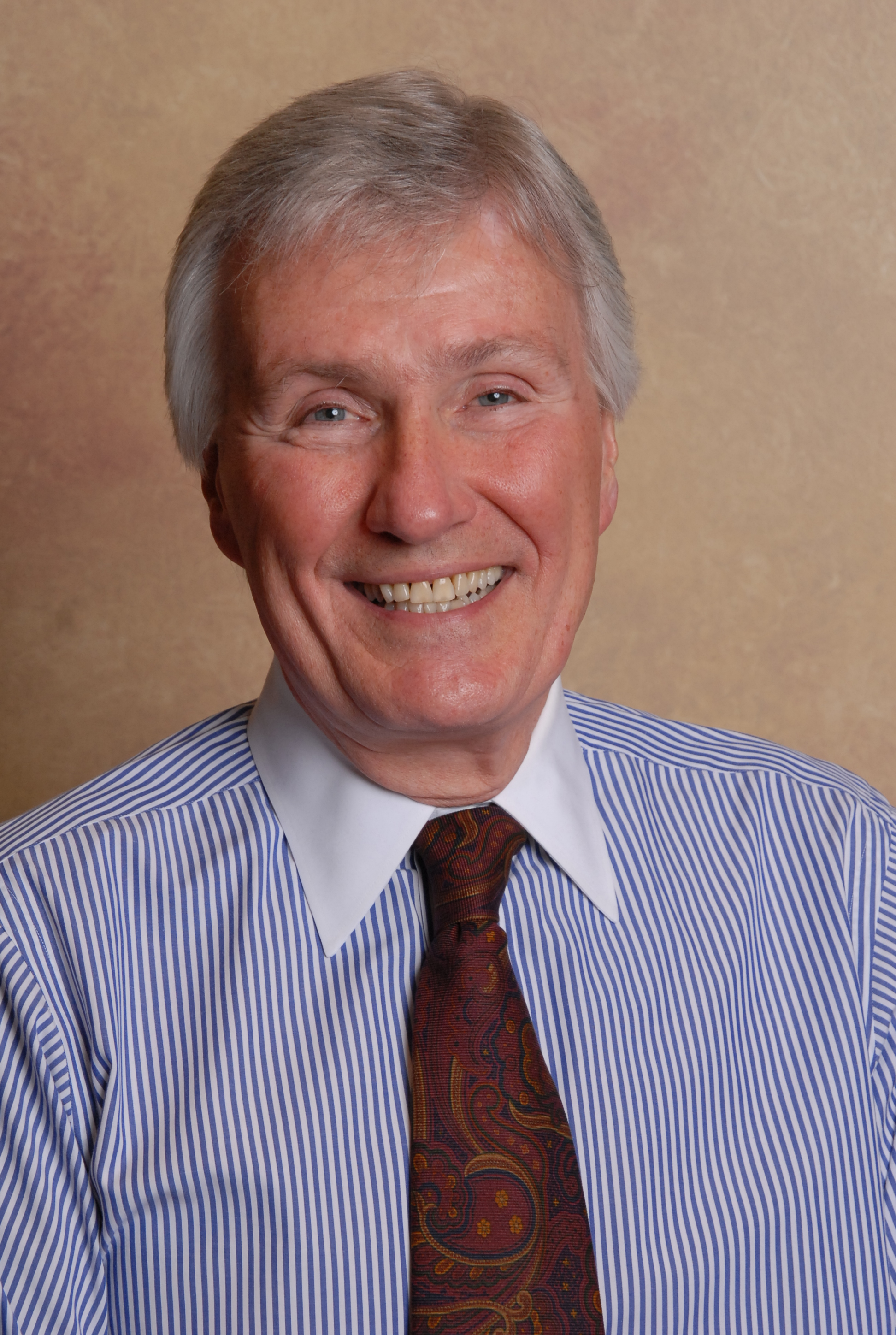
- Born: June 13, 1937; Berwyn, Illinois, U.S.
- Died: August 28, 2018 (aged 81); Chicago, Illinois, U.S.
- Education: Northern Illinois University (BA, MA)
- Occupations: CEO, Allan Cox & Associates
- Spouse: Cher Patric Cox
- Website: www.allancox.com

Allan Cox (June 13, 1937 – August 28, 2016) was an American Adlerian scholar, business consultant and author based in Chicago. Cox was CEO of Allan Cox & Associates, which he founded in 1969.

== Early life and education ==
Cox was born in Berwyn, Illinois and raised in nearby Oak Park, Illinois. Cox earned a B.A. in social science and an M.A. in sociology from Northern Illinois University.

== Career ==
Upon completing his graduate work at Northern Illinois University, Cox enrolled in the McCormick Theological Seminary with plans to enter the Presbyterian ministry.

When he was halfway through that course of study, he quit and entered advanced studies at the Alfred Adler Institute of Chicago (now Adler University) in downtown Chicago to study Adlerian psychology. Rudolf Dreikurs, a protégé of Alfred Adler, founded the Alfred Adler Institute of Chicago. Cox studied there part-time from 1963 through 1975, while teaching sociology at Wheaton College for three years and at the same time launching his management consulting career.

Allan Cox pioneered application of the theory and practice of the Adlerian school of psychotherapy to business environments and to organizations.

=== Executive search ===
Cox became an executive search consultant with Spencer Stuart, then the largest global search firm in existence, and served on its management committee. Two years later, he founded a management consulting firm that bears his name and that at first specialized in executive search.

Cox performed executive search as a retained search recruiter. That is, he was paid for the process rather than by contingency. A Chicago Magazine interviewer in 1985 wrote, "Because he spends his time writing books about the world of business and conducting executive development seminars, Cox can perform no more than eight or ten executive searches a year - only two or three at any one time - for jobs that pay at least $100,000. His satisfied clients include Coca-Cola, Continental Bank, Playboy, Carnation Company, Esmark (now part of Beatrice Foods), Cannon Mills, Publisher's Clearing House, and American Standard."

=== Author and professor ===
Cox authored eleven business books, not including all revised and updated editions, on organizations and management, and also three books of poetry. His books on organizations and management include Confessions of a Corporate Headhunter (1973), which was the first book published on the topic of executive search. Other titles include The Making of the Achiever (1985), which was made into an audiobook by Nightingale-Conant; Inside Corporate America (1986); Your Inner CEO: Unleash the Executive Within (2007); and most recently, The CEO in You (2015); and Your Place at the Table (2017).

Cox wrote a series for The New York Times Sunday business section and Field Newspaper syndicate (which was operated by Field Enterprises); articles for Chief Executive, Across the Board, [IndustryWeek], Training & Development Journal, Success (magazine), and Advertising Age. From 1986 to 1988 he wrote a weekly column for Los Angeles Times Syndicate entitled “The Achiever.” His 1985 book, The Making of the Achiever, was made into an audio program for Nightingale-Conant, and his 1990 book on teamwork—Straight Talk for Monday Morning—led to a four-part video series produced by the Bureau of Business Practice—Straight Talk on Teams.

Much of Cox’s writing and consulting work are explicitly grounded in Alfred Adler's theories and practices. Adler’s concepts of “social interest” and “style-of-life” are described in the Foreword that Cox wrote for the book, Leadership by Encouragement, authored by Drs. Don Dinkmeyer and Daniel Eckstein. This is also true of his chapter, “The Power of Team,” which leads off the human resources section of the anthology, The Best of Chief Executive (magazine), compiled and edited by J.P. Donlon. The November–December, 2007 issue of the North American Society of Adlerian Psychology Newsletter referred to Cox as “Adlerian to the bone,” quoting a Society Past President and Adler scholar, Erik Mansager.

Cox taught career development workshops at Northwestern University's Kellogg School and the University of Chicago's Graduate School of Business.

Cox died on August 28, 2016, at the age of 81.

== Published works ==
=== Business books ===
- Confessions of a Corporate Headhunter
- Work, Love and Friendship-Reflections on Executive Lifestyle
- The Cox Report on the American Corporation
- The Making of the Achiever
- The Achiever's Profile
- Straight Talk for Monday Morning
- Inside Corporate America/Perspective on Management Practices and Career Options
- Redefining Corporate Soul with Julie Liesse
- Your Inner CEO: Unleash the Executive Within
- Why Should I Care About Alfred Adler?
- The CEO in You
- Your Place at the Table

=== Books of Poetry ===
- Change the Way You Face the Day
- When the Sun Shines Through: Change the Way You Face the Day
- WHOA! Are They Glad You're in Their Lives?

== Additional references ==
- "Your Inner CEO." Video of Allan Cox address to University of Chicago Booth School of Business Entrepreneurial Roundtable, October 20, 2008 http://www.vimeo.com/allancox.
- "US Business Leaders 'Are Out of Touch With Society." U.S. News & World Report. December 13, 1982. p. 83
- "Adler University History." Adler University website. Adler University History/History/About.
- "Chicago Interview: Executive Recruiter Allan Cox." Chicago Magazine. April 1985. pp. 185ff.
- "Challenged to Serve-The Corporation in the New Age. A Conversation with Allan Cox." Training Today. April 1987. pp. 4–7.
- Best of Chief Executive, J.P. Donlon (ed.), Irwin, 1992.
- Leadership by Encouragement, Don Dinkmeyer and Daniel Eckstein, CRC, 1995.
- "Business Boards the 'Soul Train'." Management Review. American Management Association. June 1996. pp. 6–7.
- "Member Newsletter." North American Society of Adlerian Psychology. November–December, 2007, Vol.40, No.6
- "Full Plate: Review of The Cox Report on the American Corporation." Alan Kantrow. Across the Board. January 1983.
- "Review of 'Straight Talk for Monday Morning: Creating Values, Vision, and Vitality at Work'." Ian Oliphant-Thompson. Management Learning. 1992; 23; 81.
- "Team Building and the Pursuit of Human Authenticity (review of Straight Talk for Monday Morning)." David Smith. Business Ethics Quarterly. Vol. 3, Issue 1. 1993.
- "Soul as in Ethic (review of Redefining Corporate Soul)." Al Gini. Business Ethics Quarterly. Vol. 7, Issue 3. 1997.
- "Focus on Teamwork, Vision and Value." Allan Cox, New York Times. February 26, 1989.
- "Even 'Flat' Companies Need Leaders." Allan Cox, New York Times. August 20, 1989.
- "Scrap Consensus, Try Diversity." Allan Cox, New York Times. April 7, 1991.
- "Corporate Style of Life: An Adlerian Conceptualization Told in a Personal Account." Cox, Allan J. and Ferguson, Eva Dreikurs. Journal of Individual Psychology. Vol. 10, Number 4. Winter, 2016; 334-340.
