= J. Sterling Morton High School East Auditorium =

- Morton, J. Sterling, High School East Auditorium
- U.S. National Register of Historic Places
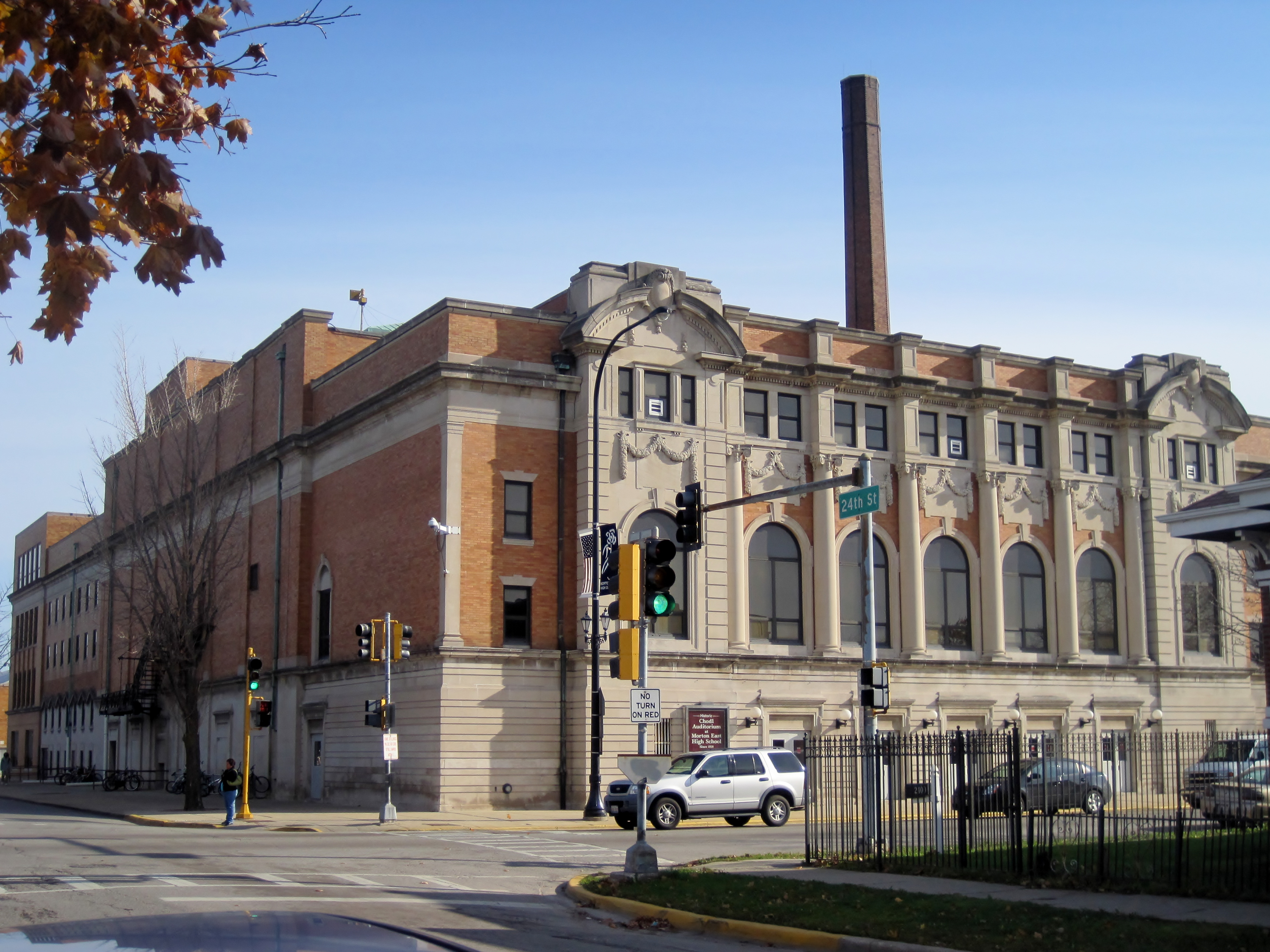

- Location within Illinois Location within the United States
- Location: 2423 S. Austin Blvd., Cicero, Illinois
- Coordinates: 41°50′47″N 87°46′23″W
- Built: 1925
- Architect: Ashby, Ashby and Schultz
- Architectural style: Beaux Arts
- NRHP reference No.: 83000312
- Added to NRHP: May 09, 1983

J. Sterling Morton High School East Auditorium, also known as Chodl Auditorium, is a Beaux-Arts building in Cicero, Illinois that was built in 1925 for J. Sterling Morton High School East. It was listed on the National Register of Historic Places in 1983. With a seating capacity of 2,545 the Chodl Auditorium was a popular place for community events and high school productions. It was the largest high school auditorium and non-commercial stage in the state. The stage, in fact, was big enough to serve as a regulation basketball floor. Theatrical productions were staged in the fall and spring when gym classes were held outside.

On September 18, 2013, the Chicago Symphony Orchestra performed their 2013 Community Concert at Chodl Auditorium. More than 2,000 individuals attended the concert, including Illinois Lieutenant Governor Sheila Simon and local dignitaries.
