= Felix Biestek =

American priest and social worker

Rev. Felix Biestek (1912–1994) was an American priest and professor who made significant contributions to the field of social work during its period of expansion following World War II.

Biestek was born in Cicero, Illinois, and graduated from Loyola University of Chicago in 1938. He was ordained in 1945. He earned a master's degree in sociology at St. Louis University and a master's degree (1949) and doctorate in social work (1951) at Catholic University of America in Washington D. C.

He served for over 30 years as a professor of Social Work at Loyola. He also served on the National Commission on Social Work as chairman of its committee on accreditation.

He died December 24, 1994, at the Loyola University's Jesuit Residence in Chicago. He was 82. His papers are held at the Loyola University of Chicago Archives. A biography of him was published in 1997.

== Biestek's Principles of Social Casework ==
Individualization: The recognition of each client as a unique individual. It is based on the need and the right of each human being to be treated as an individual and not just as a typical member of a category or group.

Purposeful expression of feeling: The recognition of the client's need to express his feelings freely, especially his negative feelings. The worker listens purposefully, neither discouraging nor condemning the expression of these feelings. To deny a client the opportunity to express his feelings, his fears, his hopes, his hostility, etc. is a refusal to deal with the total person. In social work, it is believed that every problem or request for help has an emotional component, and that the client has a need and right to express it.

Controlled emotional response: The worker's sensitivity to the client's feelings, an understanding of the meaning of these feelings, and a purposeful, appropriate response. The worker's response is not only verbal; it is also nonverbal. The worker becomes "involved" emotionally by sensing and responding to feelings. The involvement is "controlled" by the self-discipline of the worker, the purpose of the case, and other factors. This principle is one of the key principles in social work

Acceptance: The worker perceives and deals with the client as he really is, including his strengths and weaknesses, his positive and negative feelings, his constructive and destructive attitudes and behaviour, while maintaining and communicating a sense of the client's innate dignity and personal worth. Acceptance does not mean approval. The object of acceptance is not "the good", but "the real". The acceptance, which the client perceives, permits him to reveal himself fully, without damage to his sense of dignity.

Nonjudgmental attitude: The non-judgmental attitude is based on the belief that social work does not include assigning guilt or innocence. If the client fears blame and judgment, he will not talk about himself. Not only blame, but also praise and approval, are examples of a judgmental attitude. Blame and praise may have the same effect on a client: to hide a part of himself so as not to be judged.

Client self-determination: The recognition of the right and the need of the client to have freedom in making his own choices and decisions in the social work process. The worker does not take responsibility for the client, does not persuade in a controlling way, and does not manipulate the client to make decisions to conform to the worker's preferences. (The client's right to self-determination may be limited by the client's capacity for decision-making, by civil and moral law, and by the function of the agency).

Confidentiality: Confidentiality is the preservation of private information concerning the client, which is disclosed within the professional relationship, or is received from other sources in the course of working with a client. (The client's right to confidentiality is not absolute. There are situations in which another right or duty is greater than the client's right to confidentiality).

== Critiques ==
It has also been critiques on these principles being capitalistic in nature, Euro-centric, and focused too heavily on Christian values. Academics have questions on its applicability to non-European communities and other culturally rich nations and traditions.

== Publications ==
- The Casework Relationship (Loyola University Press, 1957), translated into six languages. According to The New York Times, it "became the academic equivalent of a best seller, with more than 100,000 copies sold in English alone.", Translations were published in French, Japanese, Norwegian, German, and Portuguese The book was reviewed in The British Journal of Social Work, The Social Service Review, CHOICE: and Social Work (journal)
- The Five Methods of Social Work (1960)
- Client Self-Determination in Social Work. (1978). Reviewed in The Social Service Review
