= Berwyn, Illinois =

- City
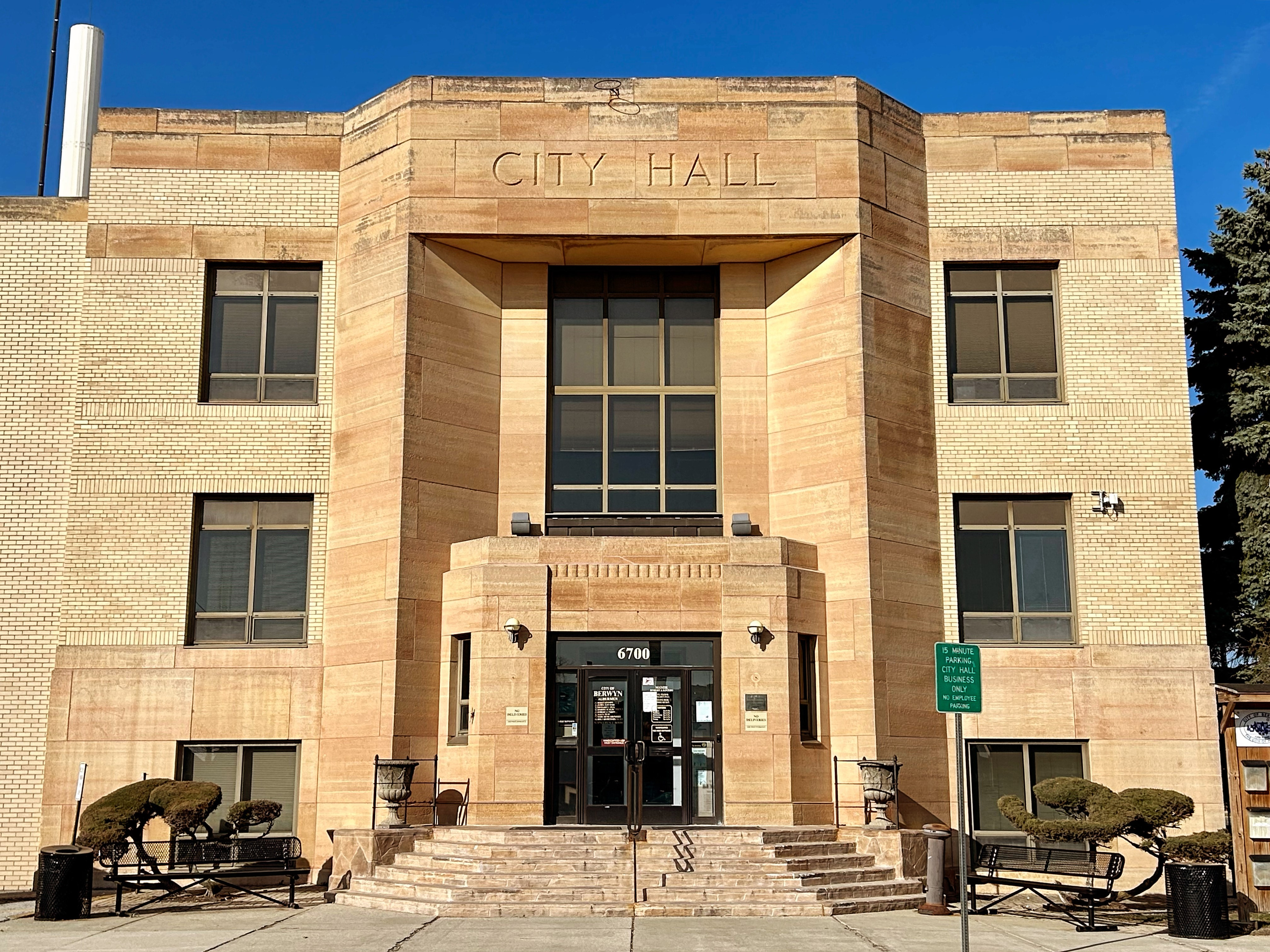
- Berwyn City Hall, listed on the National Register of Historic Places

- Flag Seal
- Nickname: The City of Homes
- Interactive map of Berwyn, Illinois
- Location of Berwyn in Greater Chicago Area Location of Berwyn in Illinois Location of Berwyn in the USA
- Coordinates: 41°50′33″N 87°47′24″W
- Country: United States
- State: Illinois
- County: Cook
- Township: Berwyn
- Incorporated: June 6, 1908

Government
  - Type: Mayor–council
  - Mayor: Robert Lovero

Area
  - Total: 3.90 sq mi (10.11 km^{2})
  - Land: 3.90 sq mi (10.11 km^{2})
  - Water: 0 sq mi (0.00 km^{2}) 0%

Population (2020)
  - Total: 57,250
  - Estimate (2024): 55,152 ▼
  - Density: 14,662.7/sq mi (5,661.31/km^{2})
- Up 4.9% from 2000

Standard of living (2018–2022)
  - Per capita income: $31,736
  - Median home value: $272,900
- Time zone: UTC−6 (Central)
  - Summer (DST): UTC−5 (Central)
- ZIP Code: 60402
- Area codes: 708/464
- Geocode: 17-05573
- FIPS code: 17-05573
- Website: www.berwyn-il.gov

Berwyn (/ˈbɜːrwɪn/) is a suburban city in Cook County, Illinois, United States. It is coterminous with Berwyn Township, which was formed in 1908 after breaking off from Cicero Township. As of the 2020 census, the city had a total population of 57,250. It is part of the Chicago metropolitan area.

== History ==
Before being settled, the land that is now Berwyn was traversed by Native American trails. The most important trails converged near the Chicago portage, and two notable routes crossed what is today Berwyn. A branch of the Trail to Green Bay crossed Berwyn at what is now Riverside Drive, and the Ottawa Trail spanned the southern end of the city.

In 1846, the first land in "Berwyn" was deeded to Theodore Doty, who built the 8-foot-wide (2.4 m) plank road from Chicago to Ottawa along the Ottawa Trail. The trail had been used as a French and Indian trade route and more recently as a stagecoach route to Lisle. This thoroughfare, then known as Old Plank Road, became what is now Ogden Avenue in South Berwyn. In 1856, Thomas F. Baldwin purchased 347 acres (1.40 km^{2}) of land, bordered by what is now Ogden Avenue, Ridgeland Avenue, 31st Street, and Harlem Avenue, in hopes of developing a rich and aristocratic community called "LaVergne". However, few people were interested in grassy marshland. Mud Lake extended nearly to the southern border of today's Berwyn, and the land regularly flooded during heavy rains. The only mode of transportation to LaVergne was horse and buggy on the Plank Road.

To encourage people to move to LaVergne, Baldwin sold an 80-foot-wide (24 m) strip of property to the Burlington and Quincy Railroad in 1862. The rail line opened in 1864, but the train did not stop regularly in the area. The railroad refused to build a station, so the residents of the area constructed LaVergne Station on Ridgeland Avenue in 1874.

However, the financial panic of 1873 and Baldwin's death in 1876 stunted the growth of LaVergne. Baldwin's daughter, Emma, inherited her father's estate, and in 1879 she sold most of the land to a group of realtors controlled by Marshall Field. The new development enacted building codes and stipulated the minimum building cost of each home. By the end of 1880, 12 new homes were built. By 1888, the settlement had grown so much that the Baldwin family donated the triangular piece of land bounded by Ogden Avenue, 34th Street, and Gunderson Avenue so that a school could be built. LaVergne School became the first public building in Berwyn.

In 1890, Charles E. Piper and Wilbur J. Andrews, two Chicago attorneys, purchased a 106-acre (0.43 km^{2}) plot of land from the Field syndicate to develop. The land was bounded by 31st Street, Wesley, Kenilworth, and Ogden Avenues. On May 17, 1890, approval was received from Cicero Township, and Berwyn, Illinois, was founded

Piper and Andrews wanted the railroad to build a station in their development, but the railroad already had stations at La Vergne and at Harlem Avenue. Piper and Andrews decided to build a station with the understanding that trains would stop regularly. They did not know what to name their station so they consulted a Pennsylvania train timetable to find a name. They chose to name it after Berwyn, Pennsylvania, a Main Line suburb of Philadelphia noted for its beauty. After 1901, all settlements in the area were known as Berwyn.

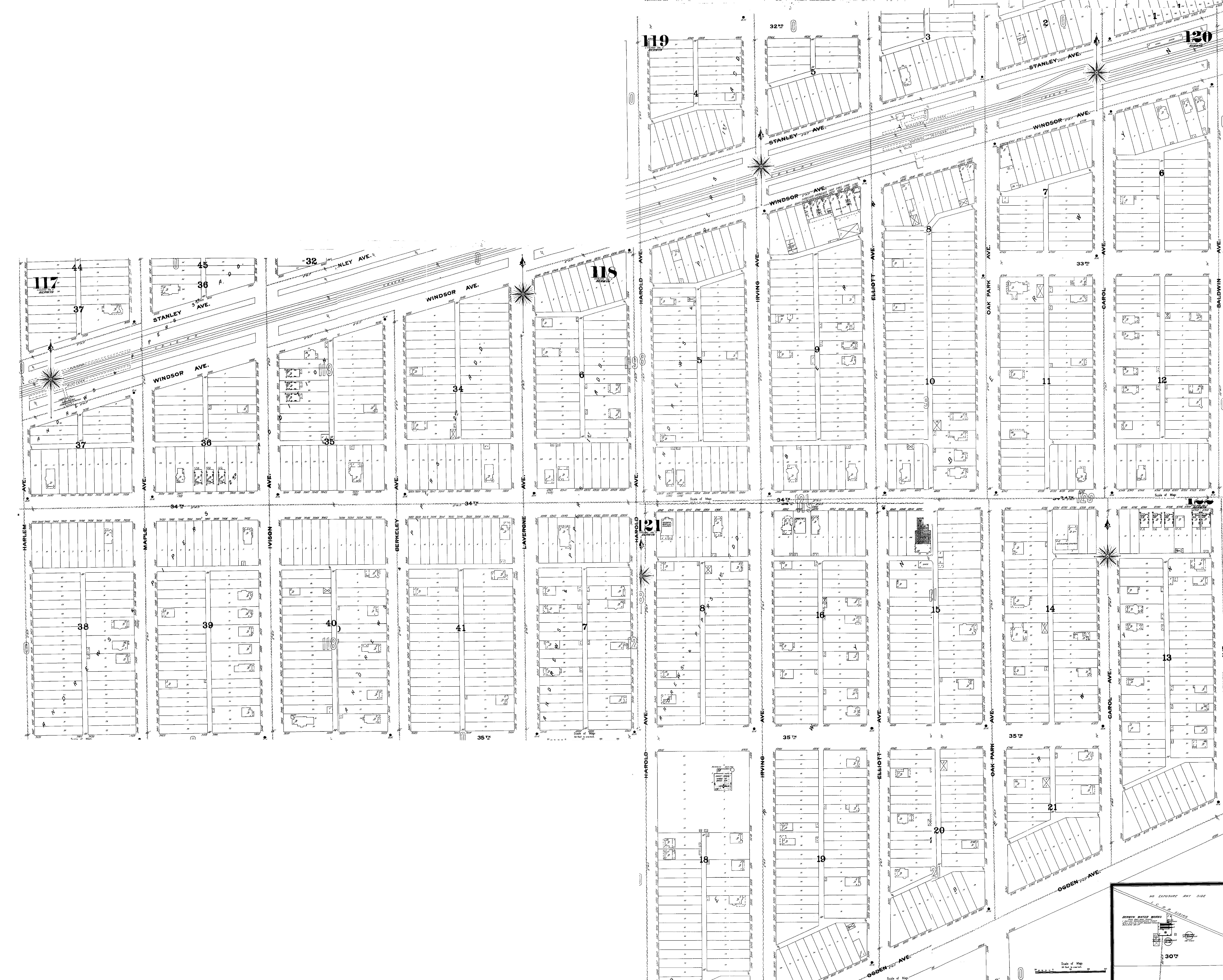
Sanborn Fire Maps show the development of the Berwyn subdivision by 1895.

While Piper and Andrews were developing the southern portion of present-day Berwyn, John Kelly was helping to develop the north part from 12th Street to 16th Street. This area was really a part of an Oak Park subdivision, and it even appeared on some maps as "South Oak Park". In fact, children who lived in this area went to school in Oak Park. John Kelly was known as "Mr. Everything" because he was a realtor, builder, insurance seller, and community servant.

In between the two settlements, there was little except for a few farms. The area between 16th and 31st streets was not settled. There were only two paths by which to travel between the two settlements, and today these paths are known as Oak Park Avenue and Ridgeland Avenue. Although Berwyn was chartered as a city in 1908, it was not until the 1920s that this middle portion of land was developed.

During this time, Berwyn was the area's fastest growing suburb. The city's stringent building codes resulted in block upon block of well-built brick two-story bungalows. Many also contained elaborate design elements typically not seen, such as stained glass windows, clay tile roofs, terra cotta, and intricate brick patterns. Today, Berwyn is noted as having the most significant collection of Chicago-style bungalows in the nation.

== Geography ==
According to the 2021 census gazetteer files, Berwyn has a total area of 3.90 square miles (10.10 km^{2}), all land. Bordering cities include Oak Park to the north, Cicero to the east, Stickney to the south, Lyons, Riverside, North Riverside, and Forest Park to the west. Geologically, Berwyn is predominately composed of Glacial Lake Bottom from the Wisconsin Glacial Episode, the most recent glacial period. A beach ridge of sand and gravel, made during one of the stages of Lake Chicago, is also present in the city. This is most easily identified as Riverside Drive. The elevation change due to the ridge is clearly seen on the 2800 block of Maple Ave. Prior to the settlement of Berwyn, the land was grassy marshland. The body of water that connected the South Branch of the Chicago River to the Des Plaines River was a shallow waterway or a muddy slough (depending on the season) known as Mud Lake. Mud Lake extended nearly to the southern border of today's Berwyn, and the southern end of Berwyn flooded regularly during heavy rains in its early years.

== Demographics ==
Historical population
Census	Pop.	Note	%±
1910	5,841		—
1920	14,150		142.3%
1930	47,027		232.3%
1940	48,451		3.0%
1950	51,280		5.8%
1960	54,224		5.7%
1970	52,502		−3.2%
1980	46,849		−10.8%
1990	45,426		−3.0%
2000	54,016		18.9%
2010	56,657		4.9%
2020	57,250		1.0%
U.S. Decennial Census; 2010 2020

=== Racial and ethnic composition ===
Berwyn city, Illinois – Racial and ethnic composition Note: the US Census treats Hispanic/Latino as an ethnic category. This table excludes Latinos from the racial categories and assigns them to a separate category. Hispanics/Latinos may be of any race.
Race / Ethnicity (NH = Non-Hispanic)	Pop 2000	Pop 2010	Pop 2020	% 2000	% 2010	% 2020
White alone (NH)	30,476	17,592	13,372	56.42%	31.05%	23.36%
Black or African American alone (NH)	588	3,373	4,622	1.09%	5.95%	8.07%
Native American or Alaska Native alone (NH)	88	66	79	0.16%	0.12%	0.14%
Asian alone (NH)	1,351	1,362	1,365	2.50%	2.40%	2.38%
Pacific Islander alone (NH)	4	2	9	0.01%	0.00%	0.02%
Other Race alone (NH)	70	74	189	0.13%	0.13%	0.33%
Mixed race or Multiracial (NH)	896	512	888	1.66%	0.90%	1.55%
Hispanic or Latino (any race)	20,543	33,676	36,726	38.03%	59.44%	64.15%
Total	54,016	56,657	57,250	100.00%	100.00%	100.00%

=== 2020 census ===
As of the 2020 census, Berwyn had a population of 57,250 and a population density of 14,664.45 inhabitants per square mile (5,661.98/km^{2}). The median age was 36.4 years. 23.7% of residents were under the age of 18 and 12.0% of residents were 65 years of age or older. For every 100 females there were 97.1 males, and for every 100 females age 18 and over there were 94.6 males age 18 and over.

100.0% of residents lived in urban areas, while 0.0% lived in rural areas.

There were 19,633 households in Berwyn, including 12,348 family households. 37.0% had children under the age of 18 living in them. Of all households, 42.6% were married-couple households, 20.1% were households with a male householder and no spouse or partner present, and 28.8% were households with a female householder and no spouse or partner present. About 24.3% of all households were made up of individuals and 8.7% had someone living alone who was 65 years of age or older.

There were 21,037 housing units, at an average density of 5,388.58 per square mile (2,080.54/km^{2}), of which 6.7% were vacant. The homeowner vacancy rate was 2.1% and the rental vacancy rate was 5.5%.

Racial composition as of the 2020 census
Race	Number	Percent
White	19,080	33.3%
Black or African American	4,882	8.5%
American Indian and Alaska Native	1,595	2.8%
Asian	1,445	2.5%
Native Hawaiian and Other Pacific Islander	18	0.0%
Some other race	18,096	31.6%
Two or more races	12,134	21.2%
Hispanic or Latino (of any race)	36,726	64.2%

=== Ancestry ===
According to the 2022 American Community Survey, the top ancestries reported in the city were Mexican (48.7%), and Puerto Rican (6.9%). The top five non-Hispanic ancestries reported in Berwyn as of the 2022 American Community Survey were Polish (6.1%), German (5.6%), Irish (5.4%), Italian (5.1%), and Filipino (2.5%).

== Government ==
=== City ===
The City of Berwyn operates under a Mayor–council government form of government. The people of Berwyn elect the mayor, clerk, treasurer, and one alderman from each of the city's eight wards. The terms of elected officials are four years. The mayor is given administrative authority, and he has the power to appoint and remove all officers of the municipality, except those covered by civil service. The City Council, composed of the eight aldermen and the mayor, is the legislative organ of the city.

The seat of government is located at City Hall, 6700 26th Street.

=== Police and fire departments ===
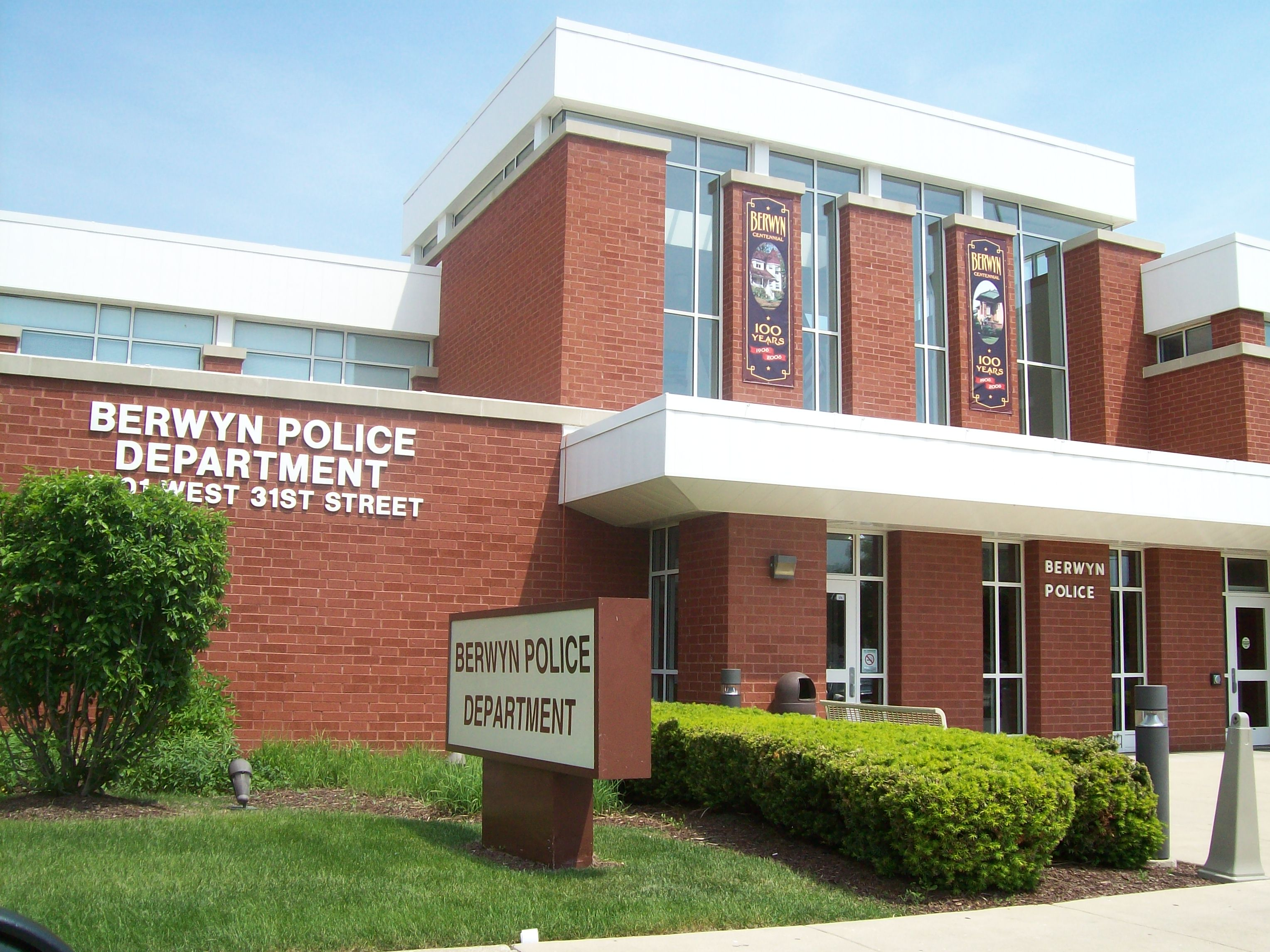
Berwyn Police Department

==== Police ====
The Berwyn Police Department has six main divisions: Administrative, Investigative, Patrol, K-9 Unit, Communications, Records, and Parking. The Berwyn Police Station is located at 6401 W. 31st Street.

==== Fire ====
The Berwyn Fire Department is composed of 80 sworn professional firefighters, 30 certified paramedics, and 11 emergency medical technicians. The Fire Department is anchored by three fire stations with the following equipment:

Station	Location	Engine Co.	Truck Co.	Ambulance	Command Unit
Fire Station 1 (South)	6434 Windsor Ave	Quint 901 Engine/Truck Combo; Reserve Fire Engine 911		Ambulance 906; Reserve Ambulance 910	
Fire Station 2 (North)	6615 W. 16th St	Engine 902		Ambulance 905	Command Vehicle 909
Fire Station 3 (Center)	6700 W. 26th St	Engine 903	Ladder Truck 904	Ambulance 907	Command Vehicle 900; Command Vehicle 908

=== Federal ===
Since 2013, Berwyn has been split between three of Illinois' congressional districts: the 3rd, 4th, and 7th district.

=== Post Office ===
The United States Postal Service operates the Berwyn Post Office (1940), at 6625 Cermak Road. The post office contains a mural, The Picnic, painted in 1942 by Richard Haines. Murals were produced from 1934 to 1943 in the United States through the Section of Painting and Sculpture, later called the Section of Fine Arts, of the Treasury Department.

=== Mayors ===
Term	Mayor
1908–1911	George H. Murphy
1911–1914	H.S. Rich
1914–1915	Charles Rudderham
1915–1917	G.M. Smith
1917–1923	George H. Anderson
1923–1925	Fred H. Rudderham
1925–1929	Frank Janda
1929–1931	Byron C. Thorpe
1931–1934	Frank Novotny
1934–1935	Maurice Shay
1935–1943	Anton Janura
1943–1945	Fred J. Mraz
1945–1946	Thomas Barrett
1946–1965	William J. Kriz
1965–1968	George E. Dolezal
1968–1969	Ralph M. Faust
1969–1977	Emil Vacin
1977–1981	Thomas A. Hett
1981–1993	Joseph Lanzillotti
1993–2005	Thomas G. Shaughnessy
2005–2009	Michael A. O'Connor
2009–present	Robert Lovero

== Education ==
Berwyn is served by two K-8 school districts:

- Berwyn North School District 98 comprises 4 schools: Havlicek Elementary, Prairie Oak Elementary, Jefferson Elementary, and Lincoln Middle School.
- Berwyn South School District 100 comprises 8 schools: Emerson Elementary, Hiawatha Elementary, Irving Elementary, Komensky Elementary, Pershing Elementary, Piper Elementary, Freedom Middle School, and Heritage Middle School.

High school students, depending on residency, attend either J. Sterling Morton High School District 201's J. Sterling Morton High School West in Berwyn or J. Sterling Morton High School East in Cicero. Most areas are west of Ridgeland Avenue and therefore are zoned to Morton West, while those east of Ridgeland Avenue are zoned to Morton East.

The Roman Catholic Archdiocese of Chicago operates one PK-8 school in Berwyn, St. Leonard School. St. Odilo closed in 2024. St. Mary of Celle closed after the 2004–2005 school year. The building and premises are still used, however. During the Great Depression, the tuition at St. Odilo was only 75 cents (about $17.7 when accounting for inflation).

Parochial grade school students who wish to move onto parochial secondary education can attend nearby schools such as Fenwick High School in neighboring Oak Park, or Nazareth Academy in La Grange Park, both of which are co-educational. Trinity High School located in River Forest is a school for girls.

Berwyn North School District 98 used to host General Custer Elementary, which was built in 1908 and later torn down in 2000. In 2002, a new state-of-the-art school was built on the same site called Prairie Oak Elementary. Emerson Elementary and Heritage Middle School share a common wall, but are separate schools. When Lincoln Middle School was built in 1928, it never had a cafeteria or library, the library was across the street (now the Berwyn Cultural Center).

LaVergne School, built in 1888, was the first school built in Berwyn, the building had two classrooms with fireplaces. Despite community protest, the 50-year-old building was torn down in 1938. It was replaced with the Lavergne Education Centre which, once an elementary school, is now the headquarters of the Berwyn South School District 100.

== Economy ==
While Berwyn is known as the "City of Homes," it also contains four primary business corridors: Ogden Ave, the Depot District, Cermak Road, and Roosevelt Road. Ogden Ave, a segment of historic Route 66, is an automobile-centered district, and at its peak the road included over a dozen car dealerships in Berwyn. The Depot District, the area around the train station, includes an array of independent shops and restaurants. Loyola MacNeal Hospital, founded in 1919, is the largest employer in the city and the center of the district. Cermak Road earned the nickname "The Bohemian Wall Street" due to the many savings and loans located there. In 1991, the Chicago Sun-Times reported that "Berwyn has the highest concentration of financial institutions in the world - a tribute to the frugality of its forebears."

The Cermak Plaza Shopping Center, which opened in 1956, is located at the corner of Harlem Avenue and Cermak Road. Notable original tenants included J. C. Penney, Walgreens, F.W. Woolworth, Kinney Shoes, Jewel Foods and Fannie May Candies. Cermak Plaza served as the main shopping center for the area until 1975 when the North Riverside Park Mall opened a half mile west on Cermak Road. Cermak Road now includes an array of retail shops and restaurants.

According to Berwyn's 2013 Comprehensive Annual Financial Report, the top employers in the city were:

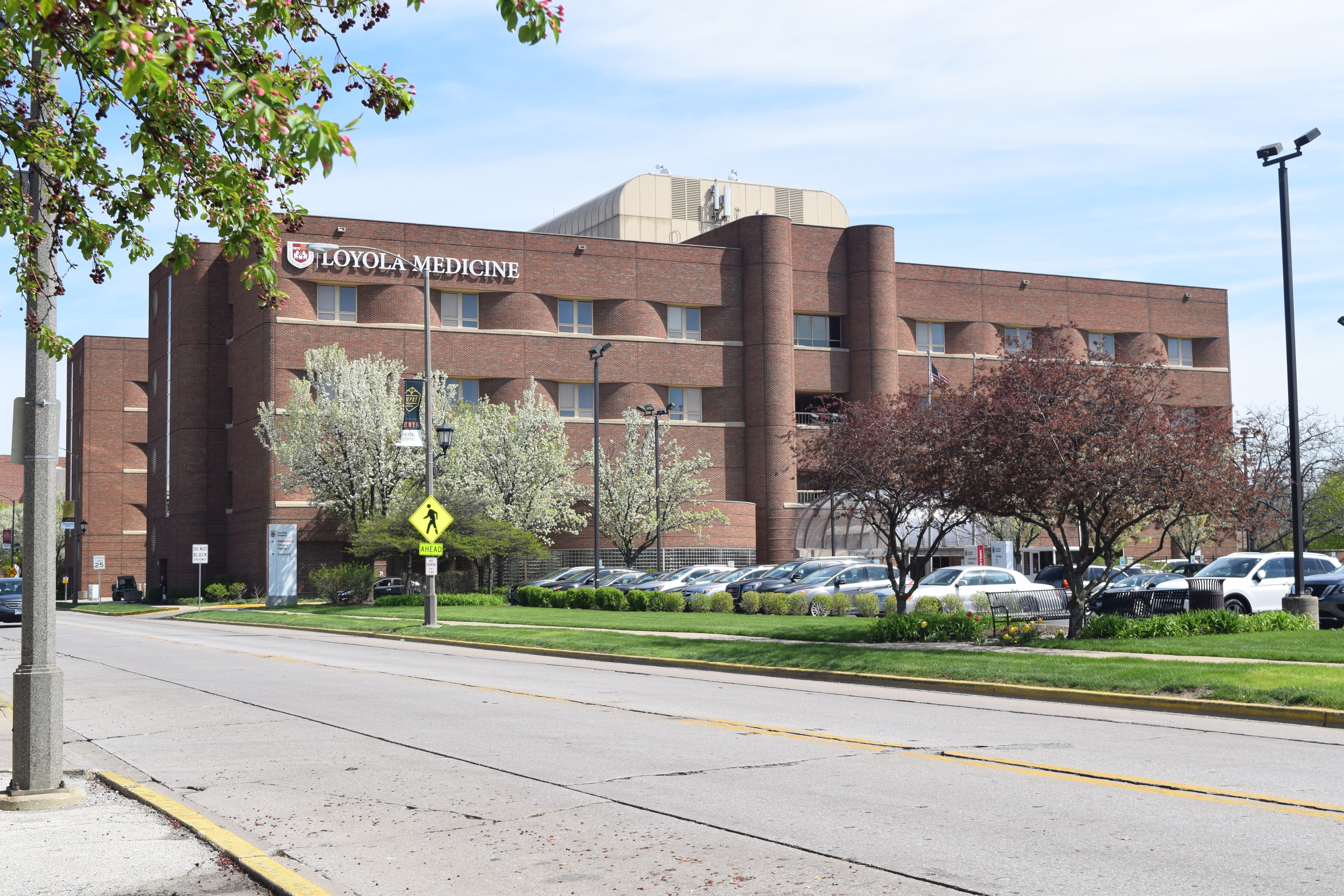
MacNeal Hospital Campus, from Oak Park Ave.

#	Employer	# of Employees
1	Loyola MacNeal Hospital	2,200
2	J. Sterling Morton High School District 201	1,000
3	City of Berwyn	550
4	Berwyn South School District 100	456
5	Berwyn North School District 98	370
6	Campagna-Turano Baking Company	300
7	Rosin Eyecare	25
8	Transloading Specialist, Inc.	50
9	Citizens Community Bank	35
10	Physicians' Record Company	35

== Transportation ==
=== Train ===
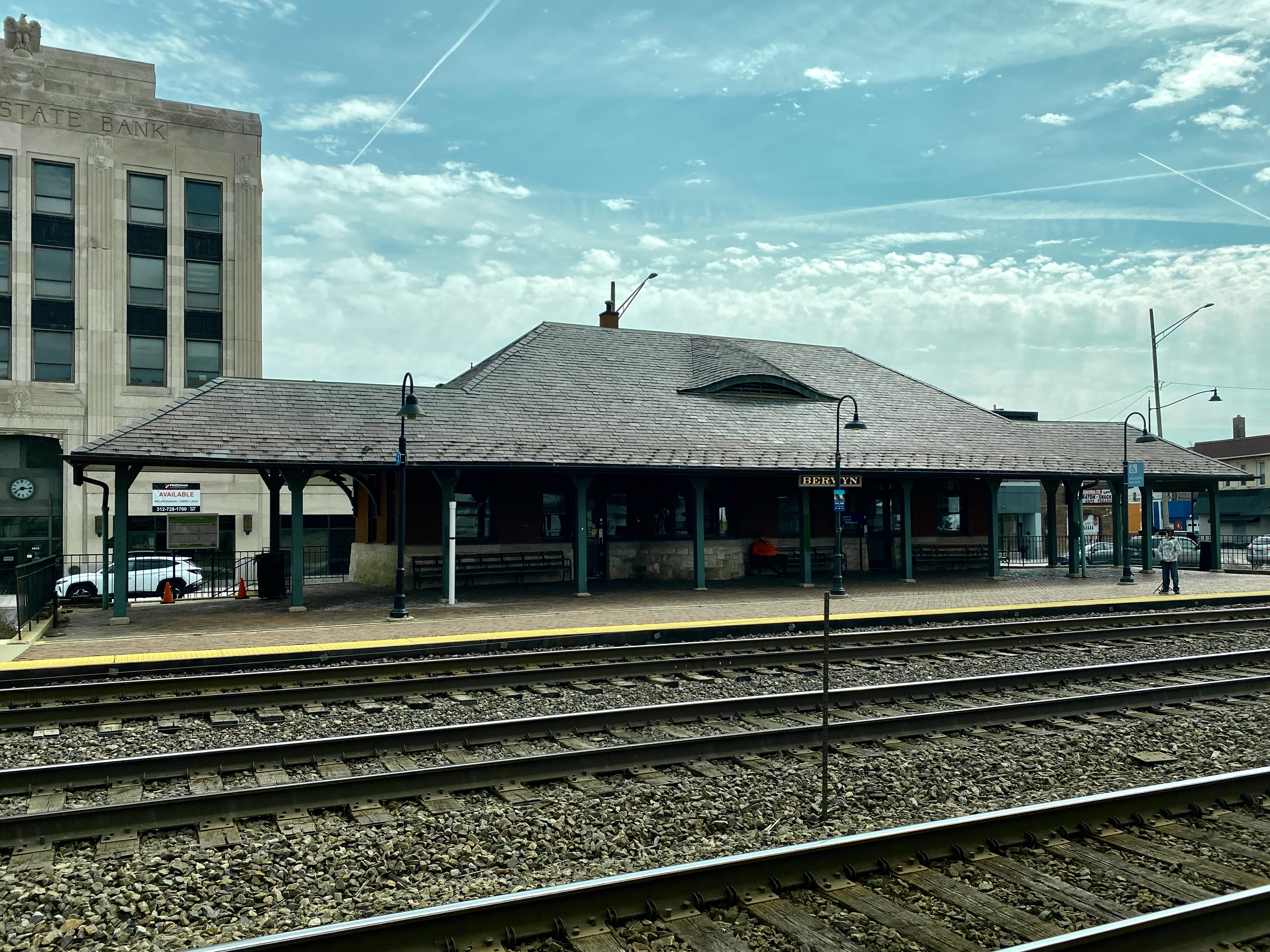
Berwyn Metra Station

Berwyn is served by the BNSF Line, and Metra operates three stations within the city: Harlem Avenue station, Berwyn Station at Oak Park Ave, and LaVergne station at Ridgeland Ave.

Until 1952 Berwyn was served by the Douglas branch of the Chicago "L". The line was extended in 1924 to Oak Park Ave, just north of Cermak Rd. In 1952 rail service west of 54th Ave was suspended and replaced by bus. The fairways that once served as the right of way for the "L" still exist as parking lots for shopping along the Cermak avenue corridor.

Berwyn was also briefly served by a steam line that ran along 19th Street at the end of the 19th and beginning of the 20th century. A station was located at Ridgeland Ave. The line was built in 1890 by the Chicago and Northern Pacific Railroad under the name Chicago & Southwestern Railroad. It extended from the C&NP mainline at 45th Street south to 16th Street and then to 19th Street. It then turned north on Harlem, returning to the C&NP mainline. The different shaped lots between Austin Blvd and Ridgeland along 19th Street attest to the previous presence of the line.

=== Bus ===
Bus service within Berwyn and to neighboring suburbs is primarily provided by Pace Bus. Additionally, CTA Route 21 serves Cermak Road through Berwyn.

=== Walkability and carbon footprint ===
Berwyn residents may be able to lead a low carbon footprint lifestyle, according to The Five Ton Life. This is due to walkable neighborhoods of modestly sized bungalows, and easy access to grocery stores.

== Arts and culture ==
Berwyn now has a growing arts community with a professional equity theater, an Arts Council and music and entertainment venues. The 16th Street Theater producing live events opened in 2007. It was named "Best Emerging Theater Company" by Chicago magazine in 2013.

=== Annual events ===
From the 1920s to the 1970s, Berwyn had a large Czechoslovak population, and to celebrate their heritage the Houby Day Parade was organized in 1968. The parade continues to today, and it coincides with the fall mushroom harvest.

Ogden Avenue is part of the "Historic Route 66" in Berwyn, and an annual Vintage Car Show has taken place in the city every year in early September since 1990. Ogden Avenue is closed to traffic from Ridgeland to Oak Park Avenue, and hundreds of car enthusiasts come out to celebrate the spirit of Route 66. In 2006, Berwyn began to host its annual art car parade called Cartopia. Art car artists from all over the country meet to show off their latest creations and then parade through the neighborhood.

In the 1960s and 1970s, many Italian families moved into Berwyn. The Maria SS Lauretana Italian-Sicilian Religious Festival was held on the grounds of Morton West High School during Labor Day weekend until 2014.

Since the year 2000, Berwyn has held an Oktoberfest and Brew Fest around mid to late-September; the festivals are held at the tracks on Berwyn Station and Proska Park respectively.

=== Public art ===
Berwyn was notable for the sculpture Spindle, created by artist Dustin Shuler and located in the Cermak Plaza shopping center along with other works of art. The Spindle was shown in the 1992 film Wayne's World. It was demolished and scrapped on the night of May 2, 2008 to make way for a new Walgreens. Grassroots efforts to Save the Spindle failed to raise the $300,000+ that it would have taken to dismantle and relocate it. This was a major upset among supporters of the sculpture, considering that it did not encroach upon the new Walgreens' final location. The two topmost cars were placed in storage; as of 2012 the Berwyn Route 66 Museum on Ogden Avenue proposes to incorporate them into a reconstruction of the Spindle.

Beginning 2019, the city has cooperated with a non-profit known as the Berwyn Public Art Initiative to provide opportunities for independent artists to create public art throughout the city.

=== Film and television ===
Portions of the 2008 film Wanted with Angelina Jolie were filmed at Cermak Plaza. Segments of the films A League of Their Own, The Color of Money, and Adventures in Babysitting were filmed at FitzGerald's Nightclub in Berwyn.

In the 2023 film Late Night with the Devil, Berwyn is referenced as a nod to a running gag from the Chicago-based program Svengoolie.

Berwyn has also been used as the backdrop for multiple television productions, such as shows in the Dick Wolf Chicago franchise, The Chi, and Empire.

== Parks and recreation ==
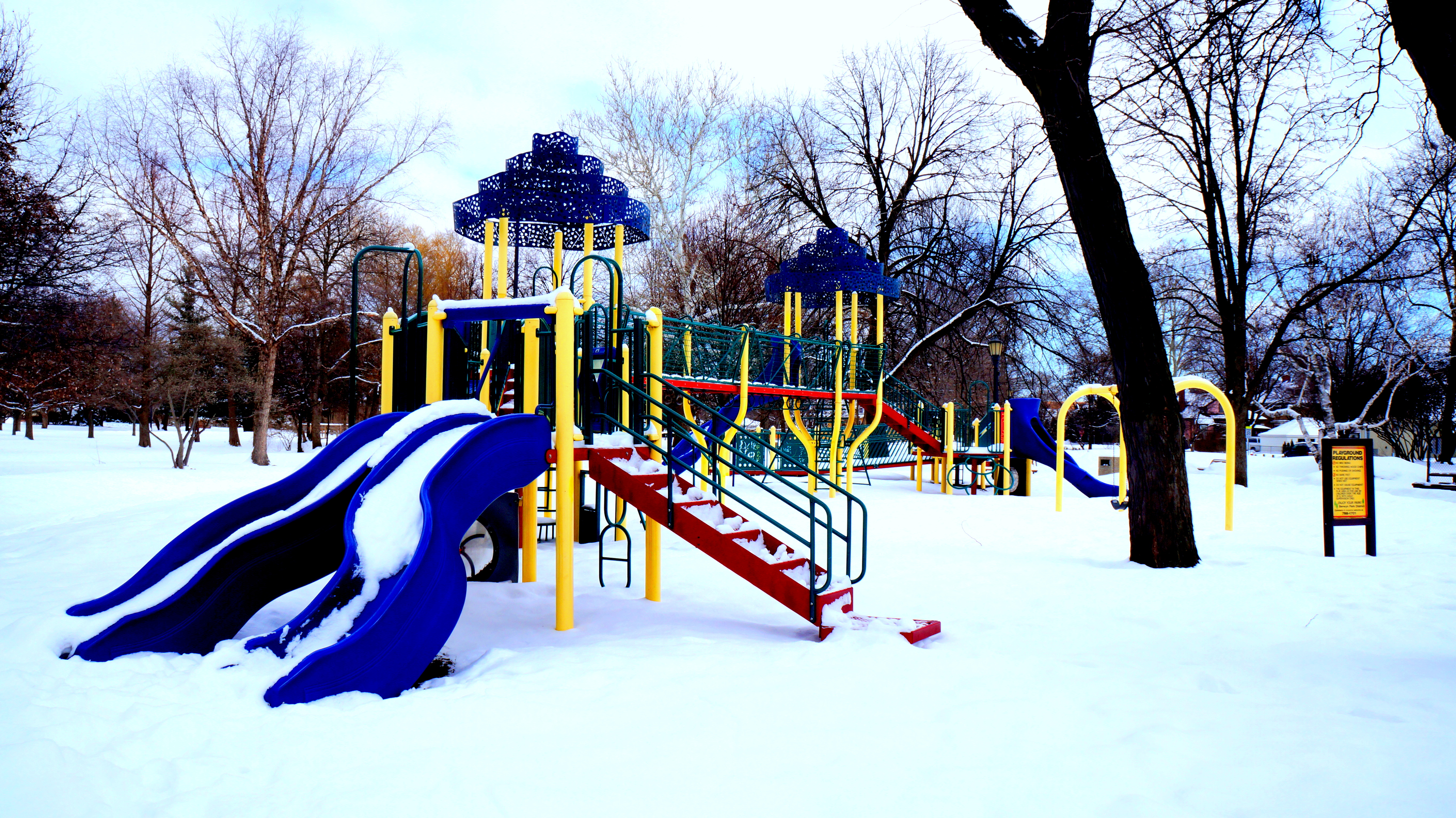
Proksa Park in the winter

Many parks and community centers are located within Berwyn. Two park districts and a recreation department maintain the city's recreational facilities and organize leagues and programming for youth, adults, and seniors. The city's largest park is Proksa Park, which comprises approximately 15 acres (61,000 m^{2}) of land. It contains numerous flower beds, 64 species of trees, 85 species of shrubs, as well as a small pond and stream. Recreational facilities include three tennis courts, two softball fields, and a large playground.

Berwyn is also home to the Pav YMCA. In 1987, the YMCA opened at 2947 Oak Park Ave, on the former site of a lumber yard that had burned down a decade earlier. The building has an Olympic-sized indoor pool, racquet and handball courts, a gym, and exercise facilities. A rehabilitation center operated in conjunction with MacNeal Memorial Hospital is present as well.

The following is a complete list of Berwyn's public parks and recreational centers:

- North Berwyn Park District
  - Community Center / Pyrce Park - 16th and Wesley
  - Berwyn Gardens - Maple and Cermak
  - Jefferson Field - 16th and Wenonah
  - Kriz Park - 15th and Maple
  - Hett Park - 19th and Cuyler
- Berwyn Park District
  - Freedom Park - 3701 Scoville
  - Friendship Park - 25th and Kenilworth
  - Hessler Park - 34th and Kenilworth
  - Karasek Park - Windsor and Kenilworth
  - Liberty Cultural Center - 6445 W. 27th Pl
  - Mraz Park - Oak Park and Riverside Dr
  - Proksa Park - 3001 S. Wisconsin
  - Serenity Park - Wesley and 26th
  - Smirz Park - 34th and Highland
  - Sunshine Park - 29th and Oak Park
  - Unity Park - 25th and Cuyler
- Berwyn Recreation Department
  - Rec Center / Pavek Pool - 6501 W. 31st
  - Janura Park - 28th and East
  - Baseball Alley - East Ave. and 29th
  - Karban Park - East and Ogden Alleys

== Features ==
Berwyn is a very diverse community, with some larger homes on its south side and many smaller, bungalow-type homes on the north side around Roosevelt Road and Cermak Road. The town also has many duplexes and three unit buildings. Because of the predominance of small residences in Berwyn, the community has an unusually low carbon footprint. According to data published by the Center for Neighborhood Technology, Berwyn had the lowest per capita CO_{2} emissions from homes and private vehicles in the Chicago area.

Berwyn has one of the world's largest laundromats, 13,500 square feet (1,250 m^{2}) in size, with 161 washers and 140 dryers, a kids' play area, big screen TVs, a bird sanctuary, and free pizza on Wednesday nights. It incurred extensive damage from an electrical fire in 2004 but was rebuilt in early 2006. This laundromat received considerable recognition for using a solar thermal system (the largest such installation in Illinois) to meet its hot water needs.

== Notable people ==
- Jeff Adams, football player; born in Berwyn
- Christopher Bielawski, Clarivate Analytics Highly Cited Researcher in synthesis and polymer chemistry
- Scarlett Bordeaux, professional wrestling valet in WWE and Ring of Honor; resides in Berwyn
- Dianne Chandler, model, Playboy Playmate
- Richard Christiansen, film and theatre critic, born in Berwyn
- Ray Clay, former Chicago Bulls public address announcer; born in Berwyn
- Allan Cox, author and business leader; born in Berwyn
- George E. Dolezal, state representative and judge; served as mayor of Berwyn
- Nick Fuentes, right-wing political commentator
- Joey Goodspeed, running back for the Minnesota Vikings, St. Louis Rams, and San Diego Chargers; born in Berwyn
- Brian Gutiérrez, soccer player for Chivas Guadalajara and the Mexico national team
- Ozzie Guillén, Major League Baseball player, 1985 AL Rookie of the Year and World Series-winning manager, lived in Berwyn during playing days with Chicago White Sox
- Gary Hallberg, golfer with the PGA Tour; born in Berwyn
- David Huffman, actor
- Fred Malek, businessman
- Ricky Mandel, professional wrestler who competed for Lucha Underground
- John J. McNichols, Illinois state representative and lawyer
- Stan Mikita, professional National Hockey League player for the Chicago Blackhawks, resided in Berwyn during his playing days
- Bob Miller, pitcher for Detroit Tigers, Cincinnati Reds, and New York Mets; born in Berwyn
- Arthur Nielsen, market analyst who founded ACNielsen company
- John Philip Novak, state legislator
- Bob Odenkirk, actor and comedian best known as Saul Goodman on Breaking Bad and Better Call Saul
- Robert Pechous, educator and politician
- Jim Peterik, musician, founding member of The Ides of March and Survivor
- Sondra Radvanovsky, opera singer
- Joseph G. Sevcik, state representative and lawyer; lived in Berwyn and served as the city attorney of Berwyn
- Iman Shumpert, pro basketball player
- Vlasta Vraz, Czech relief worker after WWII
- Jerry Wainwright, head coach for DePaul University Blue Demons basketball; born in Berwyn
- Dave Wehrmeister, pitcher for San Diego Padres, New York Yankees, Philadelphia Phillies, and Chicago White Sox; born in Berwyn
- Bob Will, outfielder for Chicago Cubs; born in Berwyn
