= David J. Kostelancik =

American diplomat

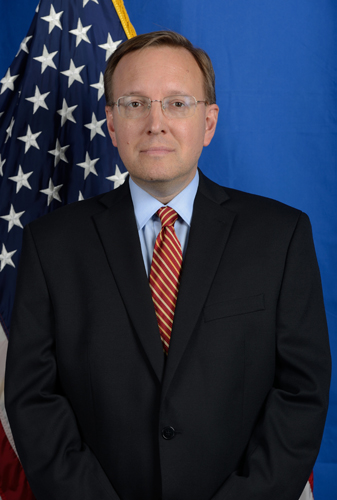

Personal details
- Education: National War College (MS); University of Michigan (MA); Northwestern University (BA)

David J. Kostelancik is an American diplomat who was a nominee to be the United States ambassador to Albania during the Biden Administration.

== Early life and education ==
A native of Illinois, Kostelancik earned a Master of Science from the National War College in national security policy. He also received a Master of Arts from the University of Michigan in Russian and East European studies and a Bachelor of Arts from Northwestern University in mathematics and political science.

== Career ==
Kostelancik is a career member of the Senior Foreign Service with the rank of minister-counselor. Early in his career, Kostelancik was posted twice to the U.S. Embassy in Moscow, Russia. Other overseas postings include the U.S. Mission to the Organization for Security and Co-operation in Europe (OSCE) and the U.S. Mission to the North Atlantic Treaty Organization (NATO), the U.S. embassy in Tirana, Albania and the U.S. embassy in Ankara, Turkey. Other assignments include director of the Office of South Central European Affairs and director of the Office of Russian Affairs, both in the Bureau of European and Eurasian Affairs, as well as director of the Office of Europe and Asia in the Bureau of International Narcotics and Law Enforcement Affairs. He previously served as deputy chief of Mission, and for two years, as Chargé d'affaires, ad interim at the U.S. embassy in Budapest, Hungary. Since August 2021, he serves as foreign policy advisor to Chairman of the Joint Chiefs of Staff, General Mark Milley.

=== Nomination as ambassador to Albania ===
On January 23, 2023, President Joe Biden nominated Kostelancik to serve as the United States ambassador to Albania. Hearings on his nomination were before the Senate Foreign Relations Committee on March 30, 2023. The committee favorably reported his nomination to the Senate floor on April 27, 2023. On January 3, 2024, his nomination was returned to the president under Rule XXXI, Paragraph 6 of the United States Senate. He was renominated on January 11, 2024. The Senate did not act on his nomination and it expired on January 3, 2025.

== Personal life ==
Kostelancik speaks Russian, Hungarian, Albanian and Turkish.
