= Cicero, Illinois =

Town in Illinois, United States

- Town
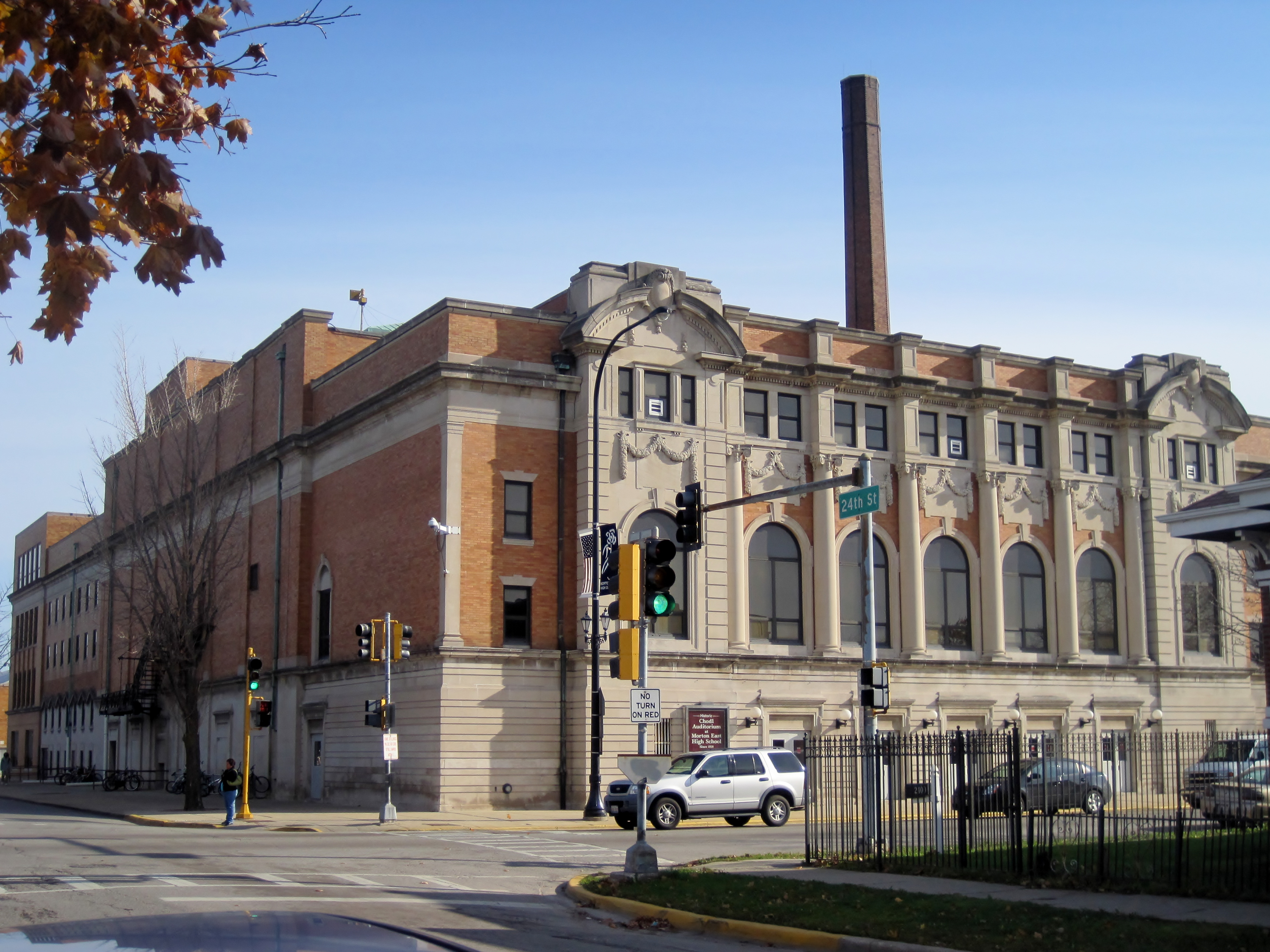
- Chodl Auditorium

- Flag Seal
- Interactive map of Cicero, Illinois
- Location within Greater Chicago Location within Illinois Location within the United States
- Coordinates: 41°50′40″N 87°45′33″W
- Country: United States
- State: Illinois
- County: Cook
- Township: Cicero
- Incorporated: February 28, 1867

Government
  - Type: Council–manager
  - President: Larry Dominick

Area
  - Total: 5.86 sq mi (15.19 km^{2})
  - Land: 5.86 sq mi (15.19 km^{2})
  - Water: 0 sq mi (0.00 km^{2}) 0%
- Elevation: 607 ft (185 m)

Population (2020)
  - Total: 85,268
  - Estimate (2024): 82,090 ▼
  - Density: 14,538.3/sq mi (5,613.28/km^{2})

Standard of living (2011)
  - Per capita income: $14,539
  - Median home value: $157,500
- ZIP Code: 60804
- Area code(s): 708/464
- Geocode: 17-14351
- FIPS code: 17-14351
- GNIS feature ID: 2584746
- Website: thetownofcicero.com

Cicero is a town in Cook County, Illinois, United States. As of the 2020 census, the population was 85,268, making it the 11th-most populous municipality in Illinois. The town is named after Marcus Tullius Cicero, a Roman statesman and orator. With a population more than 89% Hispanic, the town is the most Hispanic in the state of Illinois.

== History ==
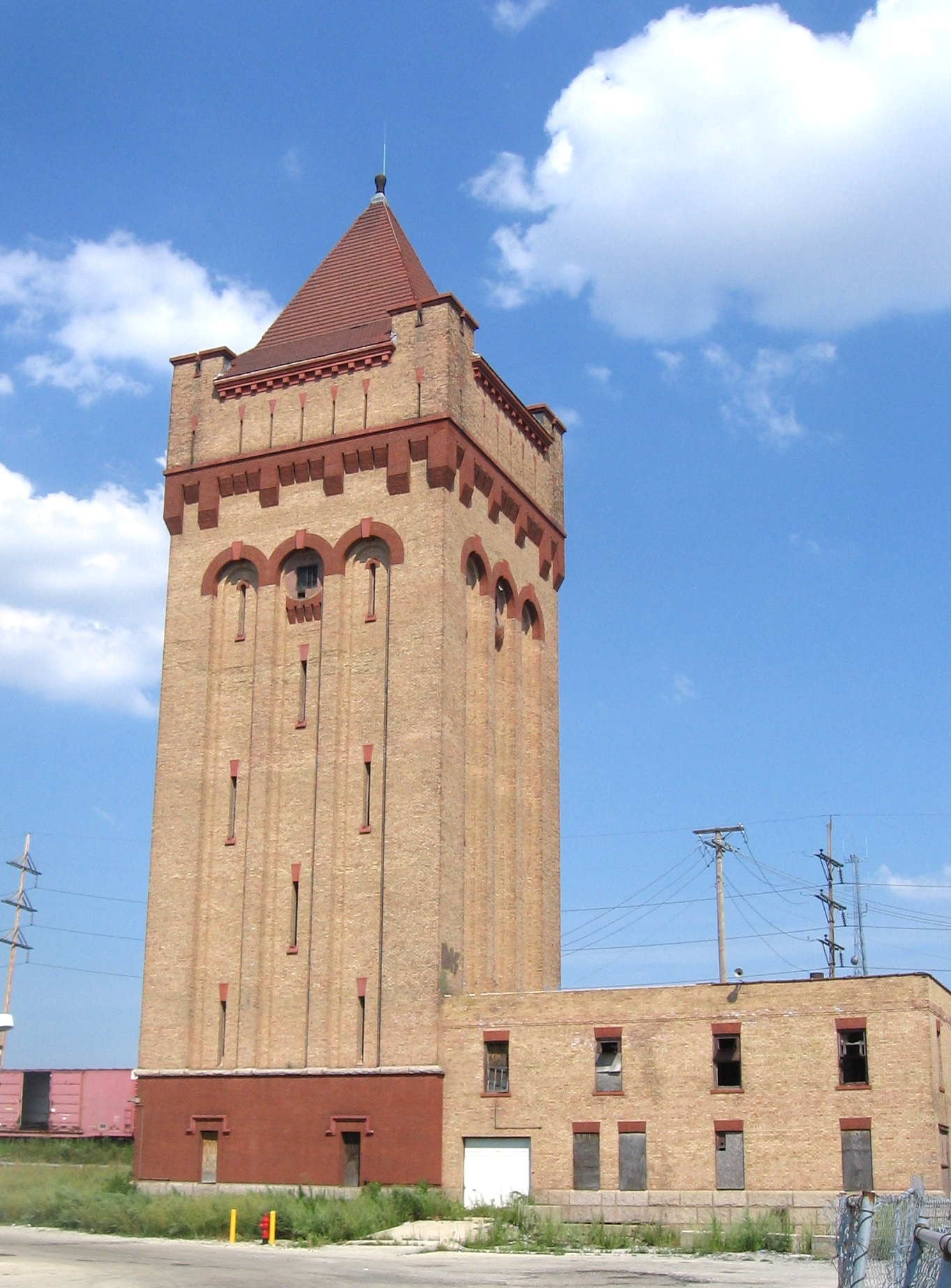
The last vestige of the Hawthorne Works, which at its peak in the early 20th century employed over 40,000 workers

Originally, Cicero Township occupied an area six times the size of its current territory. The cities of Oak Park and Berwyn were incorporated from portions of Cicero Township, and other portions, such as Austin, were annexed into the city of Chicago.

By 1911, an aerodrome called the Cicero Flying Field had been established as the town's first aircraft facility of any type, located on a roughly square plot of land about 800 meters (0.5 mi) per side, on then-open ground at 41°51′19″N 87°44′56″W by the Aero Club of Illinois, founded on February 10, 1910. Famous pilots like Hans-Joachim Buddecke, Lincoln Beachey, Chance M. Vought and others flew from there at various times during the "pioneer era" of aviation in the United States shortly before the nation's involvement in World War I; the field closed in mid-April 1916.

After building his criminal empire in Chicago, Al Capone moved to Cicero to escape the reach of Chicago police. The 1924 Cicero municipal elections were particularly violent due to gang-related efforts to secure a favorable election result.

On July 11–12, 1951, a race riot erupted in Cicero when a white mob of around 4,000 attacked and burned an apartment building at 6139 W. 19th Street that housed the African-American family of Harvey Clark Jr., a Chicago Transit Authority bus driver who had relocated to the all-white city. Governor Adlai E. Stevenson was forced to call out the Illinois National Guard. The Clarks moved away and the building had to be boarded up. The Cicero riot received worldwide condemnation.

Cicero was taken up and abandoned several times as site for a civil rights march in the mid-1960s. Cicero had a sundown town policy prohibiting African Americans from living in the city. The American Friends Service Committee, Martin Luther King Jr., and many affiliated organizations, including churches, were conducting marches against housing and school de facto segregation and inequality in Chicago and several suburbs, but the leaders feared an overly violent response in Chicago Lawn and Cicero. Eventually, a substantial march (met by catcalls, flying bottles and bricks) was conducted in Chicago Lawn, but only a splinter group, led by Jesse Jackson, marched in Cicero. The marches in the Chicago suburbs helped galvanize support for the passage of the Civil Rights Act of 1968, extending federal prohibitions against discrimination to private housing. The act also created the United States Department of Housing and Urban Development's Office of Fair Housing and Equal Opportunity, which enforces the law.

The 1980s and 1990s saw a heavy influx of Hispanic (mostly Mexican and Central American) residents to Cicero. Once considered mainly a Czech or Bohemian town, most of the European-style restaurants and shops on 22nd Street (now Cermak Road) have been replaced by Spanish-titled businesses. In addition, Cicero has a small African-American community.

Cicero has seen a revival in its commercial sector, with many new mini-malls and large retail stores. New condominiums are also being built in the city.

Cicero has long had a reputation of government scandal. In 2002, Republican Town President Betty Loren-Maltese was sent to federal prison in California for misappropriating $12 million in funds.

== Geography ==
According to the 2021 census gazetteer files, Cicero has an area of 5.87 square miles (15.20 km^{2}), all land. Cicero formerly ran from Harlem Avenue to Western Avenue and Pershing Road to North Avenue, but Chicago annexed much of that area.

=== Climate ===
Cicero is in the Hot-summer humid continental climate, or Köppen Dfa zone. The zone includes four distinct seasons. Winter is cold with snow. Spring warms up with precipitation and storms. Summer has high precipitation and storms. Fall cools down.

Cicero

Climate chart (precipitation, max. and min. temperature)
J	F	M	A	M	J	J	A	S	O	N	D
84 −5 −9	66 1 −9	50 11 −2	122 23 6	132 27 8	118 31 17	90 33 20	109 33 20	61 29 17	91 20 8	51 11 3	47 −1 −8
- █ Average max. and min. temperatures in °C
- █ Precipitation totals in mm
Imperial conversion
J	F	M	A	M	J	J	A	S	O	N	D
3.3 23 16	2.6 34 16	2 52 28	4.8 73 43	5.2 81 46	4.6 88 63	3.5 91 68	4.3 91 68	2.4 84 63	3.6 68 46	2 52 37	1.9 30 18
- █ Average max. and min. temperatures in °F
- █ Precipitation totals in inches

== Demographics ==
Historical population
Census	Pop.	Note	%±
1860	1,272		—
1870	1,545		21.5%
1880	5,182		235.4%
1890	10,204		96.9%
1900	16,310		59.8%
1910	14,557		−10.7%
1920	44,995		209.1%
1930	66,602		48.0%
1940	64,712		−2.8%
1950	67,544		4.4%
1960	69,130		2.3%
1970	67,058		−3.0%
1980	61,232		−8.7%
1990	67,436		10.1%
2000	85,616		27.0%
2010	83,895		−2.0%
2020	85,268		1.6%
U.S. Decennial Census; 2010 2020

=== Racial and ethnic composition ===
Cicero town, Illinois – Racial and ethnic composition Note: the US Census treats Hispanic/Latino as an ethnic category. This table excludes Latinos from the racial categories and assigns them to a separate category. Hispanics/Latinos may be of any race.
Race / Ethnicity (NH = Non-Hispanic)	Pop 2000	Pop 2010	Pop 2020	% 2000	% 2010	% 2020
White alone (NH)	16,787	7,696	5,332	19.61%	9.17%	6.25%
Black or African American alone (NH)	674	2,690	2,870	0.79%	3.21%	3.37%
Native American or Alaska Native alone (NH)	139	56	71	0.16%	0.07%	0.08%
Asian alone (NH)	771	467	456	0.90%	0.56%	0.53%
Pacific Islander alone (NH)	13	26	14	0.02%	0.03%	0.02%
Other race alone (NH)	64	90	162	0.07%	0.11%	0.19%
Mixed race or Multiracial (NH)	869	257	473	1.01%	0.31%	0.55%
Hispanic or Latino (any race)	66,299	72,609	75,890	77.44%	86.55%	89.00%
Total	85,616	83,891	85,268	100.00%	100.00%	100.00%

=== 2020 census ===
As of the 2020 census, Cicero had a population of 85,268, with 24,260 households and 17,508 families residing in the town. The population density was 14,538.45 inhabitants per square mile (5,613.33/km^{2}). There were 25,836 housing units at an average density of 4,405.12 per square mile (1,700.83/km^{2}).

The median age was 32.3 years. 27.4% of residents were under the age of 18 and 9.2% of residents were 65 years of age or older. For every 100 females there were 102.1 males, and for every 100 females age 18 and over there were 101.8 males age 18 and over.

There were 24,260 households in Cicero, of which 48.1% had children under the age of 18 living in them. Of all households, 45.8% were married-couple households, 20.6% were households with a male householder and no spouse or partner present, and 25.0% were households with a female householder and no spouse or partner present. About 16.5% of all households were made up of individuals and 5.5% had someone living alone who was 65 years of age or older.

Of the 25,836 housing units, 6.1% were vacant. The homeowner vacancy rate was 1.4% and the rental vacancy rate was 4.2%. 100.0% of residents lived in urban areas, while 0.0% lived in rural areas.

=== Income and poverty ===
The median income for a household in the town was $53,726, and the median income for a family was $56,632. Males had a median income of $33,835 versus $26,101 for females. The per capita income for the town was $20,040. About 11.4% of families and 13.8% of the population were below the poverty line, including 18.3% of those under age 18 and 15.3% of those age 65 or over.

=== Demographic estimates ===
As of 2011, 52.5% of occupied housing units were owned properties, and 47.5% were rentals. The average age of home properties was greater than 66 years.

=== Industry ===
Cicero is a factory town. As of 1999, about a quarter of the city contained one of the greatest industrial concentrations in the world. There were more than 150 factories in 1.7 mi (2.8 km), producing communications and electronic equipment, sugar, printing presses, steel castings, tool and die makers' supplies, forging and rubber goods.

== Arts and culture ==
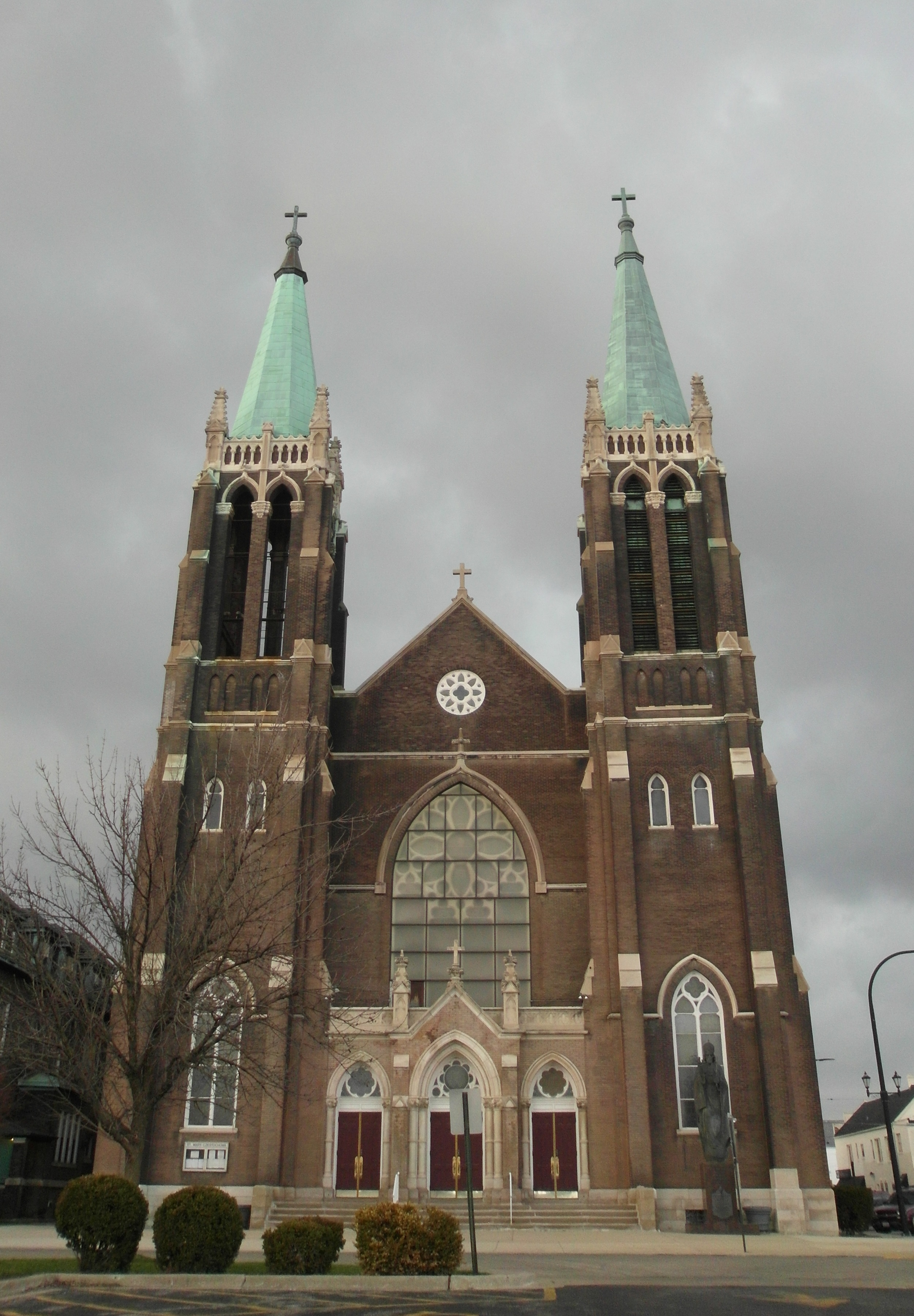
St. Mary of Częstochowa

- St. Mary of Czestochowa, a Neo-Gothic church built in the Polish Cathedral style along with the sculpture of Christ the King by famed sculptor Professor Czesław Dźwigaj, who also cast the monumental bronze doors at St. Hyacinth's Basilica in Chicago. The church's other claim to fame is as the site of Al Capone's sister Mafalda's wedding in 1930.
- J. Sterling Morton High School, East Campus, also known as Morton East High School, was built in 1894. The original school was destroyed by fire in 1924, and the current building was constructed. Located at 2423 S. Austin Blvd, Morton East serves residents of Cicero.
- Chodl Auditorium, inside Morton East High School, was completed in 1927 to replace the 1,200-seat auditorium that was destroyed by fire. The auditorium was originally a dual-purpose room, also serving as a gymnasium. In 1967 the school stopped using the auditorium as a gymnasium. Chodl Auditorium is among the largest non-commercial proscenium theatres in the Chicago Metropolitan Area and is listed on the National Register of Historic Places.
- Hawthorne Works Tower, one of the original towers of the Western Electric manufacturing plant that once stood east of Cicero Avenue, is still behind the Hawthorne Works Shopping Center near the corner of Cermak Road (22nd Street) and Cicero Avenue.
- Chicagoland Sports Hall of Fame.

On the south side of Cicero, there were two racetracks. Hawthorne Race Course, in Cicero and Stickney, is a horse racing track still in operation. Just north of it was Chicago Motor Speedway at Sportsman's Park, which was formerly Sportsman's Park Racetrack (for horse racing) for many years. That facility is now closed, having been acquired by the Town of Cicero and demolished. Facilities of the Wirtz Beverage Group have been built on the western half and a Walmart built on the eastern half.

== Government ==
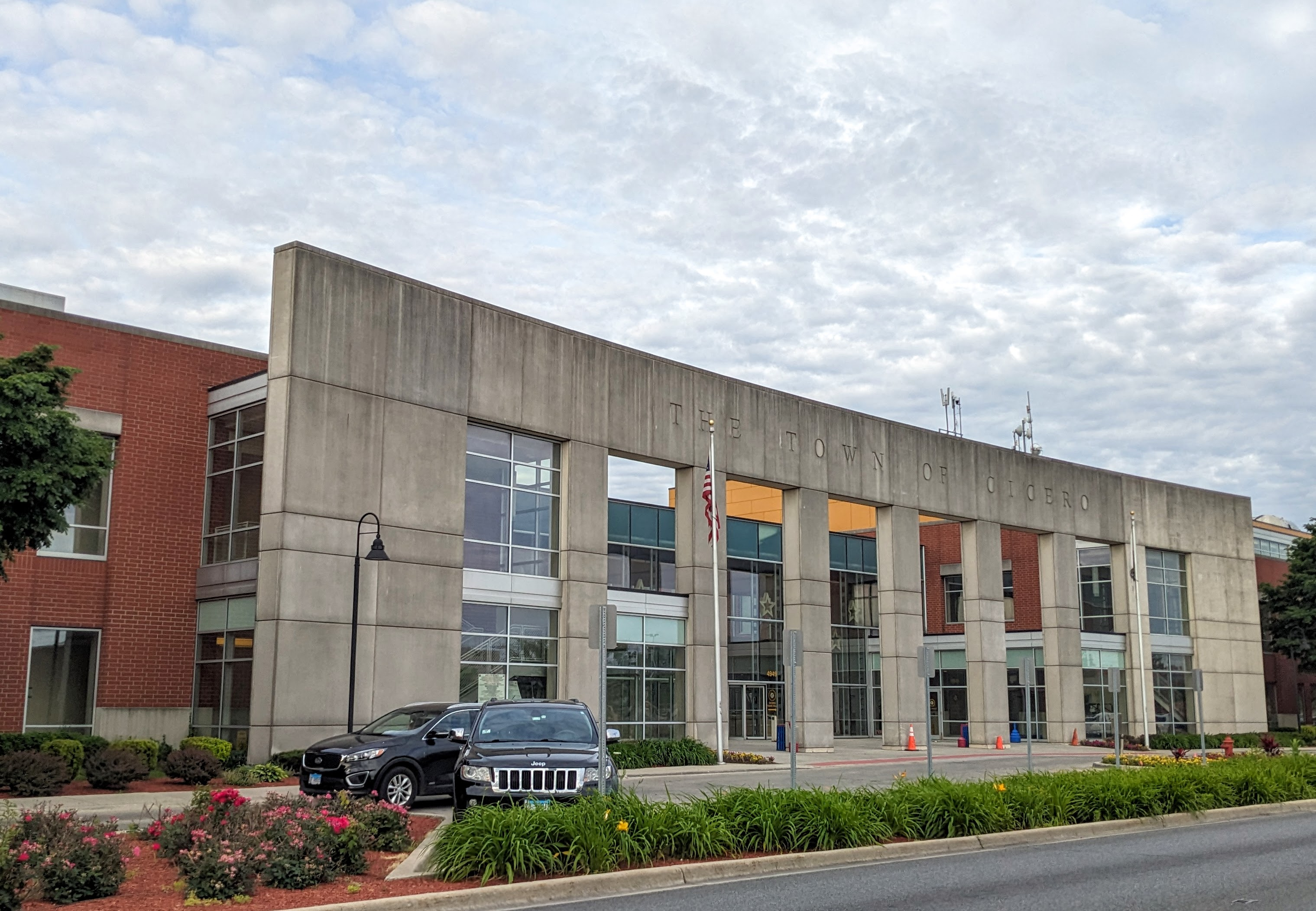
Cicero Town Hall on Cermak Road

Most of Cicero is in Illinois's 4th congressional district; the area south of the railroad at approximately 33rd Street is in the 3rd district.

The United States Postal Service operates the Cicero Post Office at 2440 South Laramie Avenue.

=== Town presidents ===
- Joseph Z. Klenha, c. 1923–1929
- Joseph C. Cerny, c. 1933–1935
- George Stedronsky, c. 1937–1943
- Henry J. Sandusky, c. 1945–1959
- John Karner, c. 1971–1972
- Henry J. Klosak, 1980–1992
- Betty Loren-Maltese, 1993–2002
- Ramiro Gonzalez, c. 2004
- Larry Dominick, since 2005

== Education ==
Cicero is served by Cicero Elementary School District 99 and comprises 16 schools, making it one of the largest public school districts outside of Chicago. Elementary students attend the following schools, depending on residency: Burnham (K-6), Cicero East (4–6), Cicero West (PK-4), Columbus East (4–6), Columbus West (PK-4), Drexel (K-6), Early Childhood Center (PK), Goodwin (PK-6), Liberty (K-3), Lincoln (PK-6), Roosevelt (4–6), Sherlock (PK-6), Warren Park (PK-6), Wilson (K-6), and Unity Junior High (7–8), which is separated into East–west sections. East side being held for eighth graders & seventh graders on the West side. Unity is the second largest middle school in the country. High school students entering their freshman year attend the Freshman Center and then continue high school at Morton East of the J. Sterling Morton High School District 201. The McKinley Educational Center serves as an alternative school for 5th-8th graders and the Morton Alternative School serves as an alternative school for 9th-12th graders

The Roman Catholic Archdiocese of Chicago operates two PK-8 schools in Cicero, Our Lady of Charity School and St. Frances of Rome School.

From 1927 until 1972, Cicero was the home of Timothy Christian School.

Cicero is also home to Morton College.

== Infrastructure ==
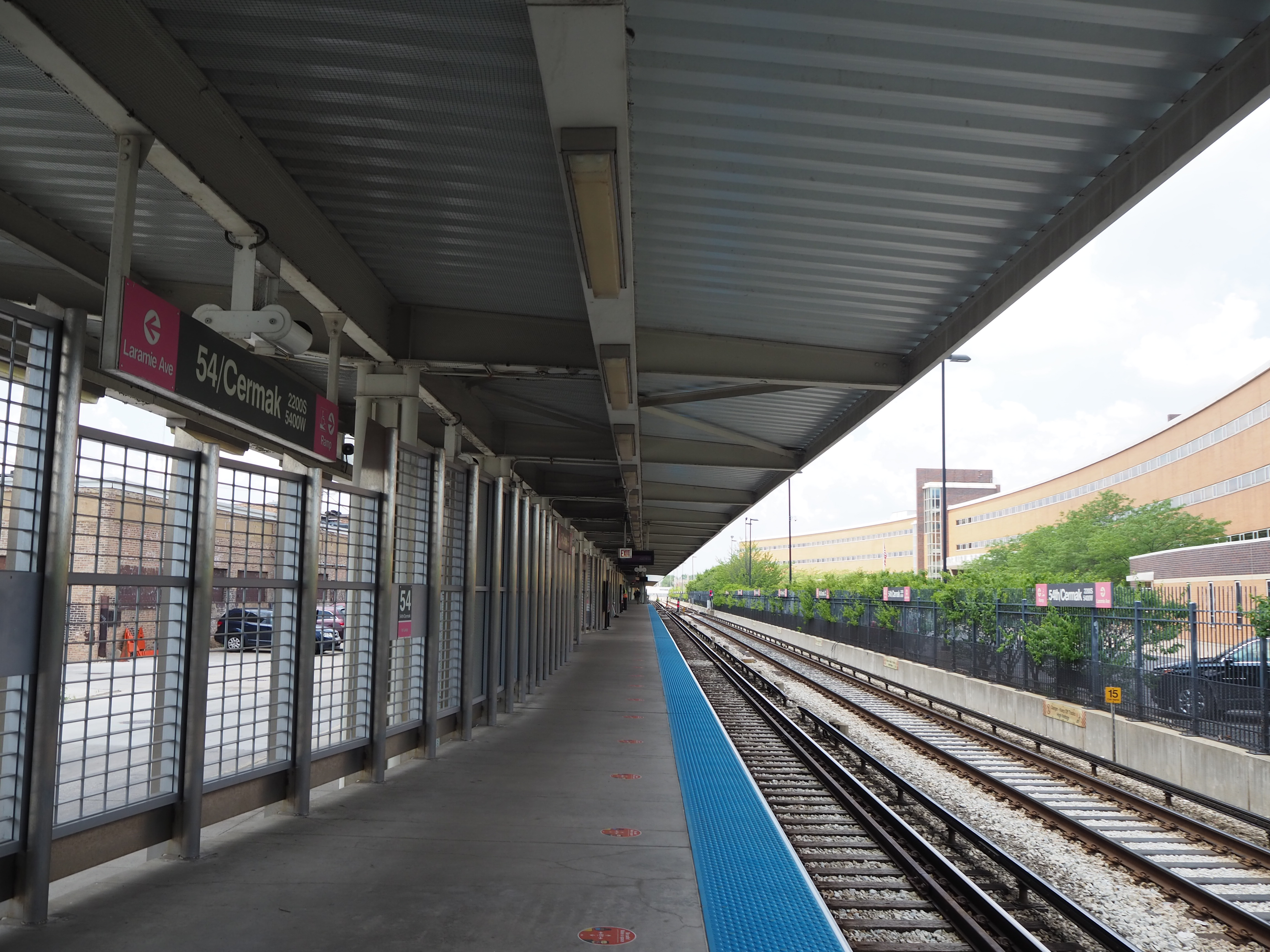
54th/Cermak station

=== Transportation ===
Cicero is served by two major railroad lines, the BNSF Railway and the Belt Railway of Chicago. Public Transportation is provided by Metra's BNSF Line between Aurora and Chicago's Union Station with a stop at the Cicero station near Cicero Avenue and 26th Street. This station is undergoing reconstruction and expansion. Also, the Chicago "L"'s Pink Line provides daily service from the 54th/Cermak terminal to the Loop. Its Cicero station is also in Cicero. Multiple Pace and Chicago Transit Authority bus routes cover portions of Cicero.

=== Fire department ===
The Cicero Fire Department (CFD) has a staff of 97 professional full-time firefighters. The CFD operates out of three fire stations.

== Notable people ==
- Felix Biestek (1912–1994), American priest and professor
- Al Capone (1899–1947), American gangster, businessman, and co-founder and boss of the Chicago Outfit
- JoBe Cerny (born 1947), an actor from Cicero, voice of the Pillsbury Doughboy
- Joe Mantegna (born 1947), Tony award-winning actor, also writer and director
- Bob Miner (1941–1994), businessman, co-founder of Oracle Corporation
- Paul Marcinkus (1922–2006), bishop, member of Propaganda Due, and former president of the Vatican Bank
- Erika Sánchez (born 1983/1984), poet and writer
- Lee Corso (born 1935), former football coach and media personality
- Donald F. White (1908–2002), architect and engineer

== In popular culture ==
- In the HBO series Boardwalk Empire, Cicero is the home of Al Capone. Many of the episode plots are based in Cicero.
- Cicero is mentioned as the hometown of Jimmy McGill/Saul Goodman and his brother Chuck McGill in Better Call Saul. Cicero is also the central location of the animated spinoff show Slippin' Jimmy, based on Jimmy's youth.
- In the musical Chicago, Velma Kelly mentions Cicero in the number "Cell Block Tango" as the location of the hotel where she murdered her husband and sister.
- In Walker Percy's novel Love in the Ruins, the schismatic American Catholic church establishes Cicero as its "new Rome."
- In Bertolt Brecht's The Resistible Rise of Arturo Ui, Cicero is annexed by Chicago as a satirical allegory for the Nazi annexation of Austria.
- In Guys and Dolls, the Chicago-area gangster "Big Julie" claims to be from "East Cicero, Illinois" (and pronounces the "s" in Illinois).
- The 1948 film noir Sorry, Wrong Number takes place in New York City, but in flashbacks recounted by several characters it is revealed that the story begins in Chicago and Cicero. Leona Cotterel (Barbara Stanwyck) is the spoiled daughter of the owner of a pharmaceutical company in Cicero. She lives with her father in a Chicago mansion. A few years later, after she marries, the story moves to Bayonne, New Jersey, and ends in Manhattan and Staten Island.
- Al Bundy from the show Married... with Children mentions that he gets his hair cut in Cicero.
- In the song "Guns Under the Counter" by The Fiery Furnaces (from their album Rehearsing My Choir), Cicero is mentioned in the line "In Cicero, Never stand at a window".
- In Chicago P.D., Sgt. Hank Voight mentions he's from Cicero.

== See also ==
- List of sundown towns in the United States
