= South Berwyn School District 100 =

School district in Illinois, United States

Address
- 3401 Gunderson Avenue Berwyn, Illinois, 60402; United States

District information
- Type: Public
- Grades: PreK–8
- Superintendent: Dr. Mary Havis
- NCES District ID: 1706090

Students and staff
- Students: 3,050
- Teachers: 260.95 (on an FTE basis)
- Staff: 482.95 (on an FTE basis)
- Student–teacher ratio: 11.69:1

Other information
- Website: www.bsd100.org

Berwyn South School District 100 is located in Berwyn, Illinois.

== Governance ==
Berwyn South School District 100 has seven Board of Education members who are elected every four years by the community. They appoint a superintendent to run district operations on a daily basis. As of the 2025-2026 school year, the seven Board of Educations that serve are Elizabeth Jimenez (President), Coryn Steinfeld (Vice-President), Wendy Gonzales, Summer Butler, Adriana Caballero, Amanda Drenth, and Jonathan Palles. The current superintendent is Dr. Mary Havis who was 2017 after serving as interim superintendent in 2016.

== Schools ==
=== Elementary schools ===
- Emerson Elementary School
- Hiawatha Elementary School
- Irving Elementary School
- Komensky Elementary School
- Pershing Elementary School
- Charles E. Piper Elementary School

=== Middle schools ===
- Freedom Middle School
- Heritage Middle School
