= Cicero Public School District 99 =

School district in Illinois, United States

Address
- 5110 W. 24th Street Cicero, Cook County, Illinois, 60804; United States

District information
- Type: Public School District
- Motto: Igniting the road to future!
- Grades: Pre-K–8th
- Superintendent: Aldo Calderin
- Schools: 15 "Cicero School District 99 - Stats and Facts". National Center for Education Statistics.
- Budget: US$140 million "Illinois State Board of Education". Illinois State Board of Education.
- NCES District ID: 17031

Students and staff
- Students: 12,857 "CICERO SD 99 Enrollment". Illinois State Board of Education.
- Teachers: 722
- Student–teacher ratio: 21:1 "District Details". Illinois State Board of Education.

Other information
- Website: www.cicd99.edu

Cicero Public School District 99 is a school district in Illinois. It has its headquarters in Cicero.

== Schools ==
K-6:

- Burnham School
- Francis Martin Drexel School
- Woodrow Wilson School

4-6:

- Cicero East School
- Christopher Columbus East School

Pre-K-4:

- Cicero West School
- Christopher Columbus West School

Pre-K:

- Early Childhood Center

Pre-K-6:

- Goodwin School
- Abraham Lincoln School
- Sherlock School
- Warren Park School

K-3:

- Liberty School

5-6:

- Theodore Roosevelt School

7-8:

- Unity Junior High School
