= Vlasta Vraz =

Czech American relief worker, editor, and fundraiser

Vraz in Moravská Ostrava, 1945–1946

Vlasta Adele Vraz (June 18, 1900 – August 22, 1989) was a Czech American relief worker, editor, and fundraiser. She was director of American Relief for Czechoslovakia, and president of the Czechoslovak National Council of America. In 1949 she was arrested by Czech authorities on espionage charges, but quickly released after pressure from the United States.

== Early life ==
Vlasta Adele Vraz was born in Chicago and raised in Czech California, South Lawndale, Chicago. Her father was Enrique Stanko Vraz (1860–1932), a naturalist and explorer born in Bulgaria to Czech parents. Her mother was also called Vlasta Vraz (1875–1961). Her maternal grandfather August Geringer (1842–1930) published a Czech-language Daily, Svornost, in the United States, starting in 1875.

== Career ==
She lived in Prague as a young woman, from 1919 to 1939, at first helping her father who was lecturing there before he died in 1932. During World War II she returned to the United States with her widowed mother, and was a secretary in Washington, D. C. for the Czech government in exile. In 1945, she was back in Prague, directing American Relief for Czechoslovakia. She was responsible for distributing $4 million in food, medicine, clothing and other supports. She was inducted into the Order of the White Lion by Jan Masaryk in 1946, for her relief work. But in 1949, Vraz was arrested by the Communist authorities, on espionage charges, sparking protests from the United States.

Upon release after a week in custody, Vraz returned to the United States, where she became president of the Czechoslovak National Council of America, and edited two national publications for the Czechoslovak-American community. She was called upon for reactions during the 1968 Warsaw Pact invasion of Czechoslovakia.

== Personal life ==
Vlasta Vraz died in 1989, aged 89 years. Her remains were buried in the Bohemian National Cemetery in Chicago, near those of her mother and her brother, Victor E. Vraz, an economics professor at Northwestern University. Some of her papers are in the Geringer Family Papers, archived at the Chicago History Museum. The rest of her papers was bequeathed to the Náprstek Museum in Prague, Czech Republic. The same institution owns extensive personal papers of her father Enrique Stanko Vráz.
