= J. Sterling Morton High School West =

J. Sterling Morton West High School
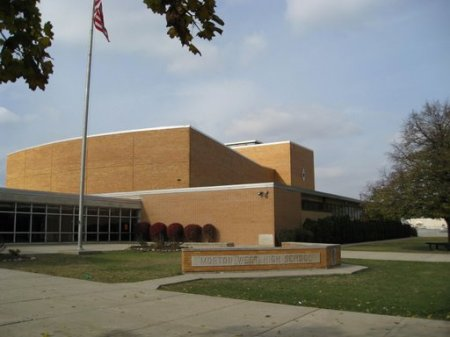
- J. Sterling Morton High School West in 2016
- Berwyn, Illinois; United States

Information
- Type: High school
- Established: 1958
- Principal: Ms. Kristina Cavanaugh
- Staff: 218.00 (FTE)
- Enrollment: 3,374 (2024–2025)
- Student to teacher ratio: 15.48
- Colors: Maroon, Gray, and White
- Website: mortonwest.morton201.org

J. Sterling Morton High School West is an Illinois based high school.

== History ==
District 201 had plans to open a second high school in Berwyn, going as far as to purchase the property needed. However, after years of trying to convince voters of a need, voters narrowly defeated the US$600,000 bond issue needed for construction.

In 1943, the issue of adding a second school again was raised, with a proposal to build it on the site of Gage Farm in Berwyn. While the issue was raised, it was realized that any planning would need to wait until after the war. In 1953, a US$5.9 million bond issue was approved by voters for construction of a new school and athletic fields in Berwyn.

As late as March 2006, the school board set Ridgeland Avenue as the attendance boundary for the schools, sending 45% of then-Morton students to the new school. The opening of the new school also brought an end to three decades of split shift attendance.

One early logistics problem with the new school was the requirement for some students to cross the Illinois Central Railroad tracks near the school. City of Berwyn worked with the railroad to create a pedestrian underpass to accommodate students who would need to cross the tracks.

In 1966 the school added two new wings, F-hall and W-hall. In the late 1990s, The school added a new addition to W-hall and M-hall. An extension of W-hall specifically for freshmen was built in the late 2010s.

In 1995, a Hispanic student, in an attempt to make a political statement against "slavery, Japanese internment during World War II and other forms of discrimination that stain U.S. history", burned an American flag at his home, and brought the remains to school for friends to view in his locker. Some white students took exception to this and began to yell and threaten him. Racial tensions began to mount over a few days prompting the school to confiscate the remains of the flag. Several white students mounted a mass recital of the Pledge of Allegiance in the student cafeteria, though were muted by the school officials. The United States Department of Justice sent conciliation specialists to the school, and the key students involved formed a Conflict Resolution Committee. The student apologized for burning the flag because he had offended those whom he did not wish to, and the Conflict Resolution Committee remained a part of the school to deal with other problems.

Morton West became the subject of national news coverage in late 2007. On November 1, 2007, twenty five students staged a sit-in in the student cafeteria to protest the presence of military recruiters who occasionally visit the school. The school suspended the students, and then moved for their expulsion, citing the students had been a disruption to the school day. The students challenged this assertion, and many of them and their parents protested outside the school on November 6. On November 7, several students and parents protested at a school board meeting, requesting not only that the expulsions be overturned, but that students be given an opportunity to express themselves freely. The superintendent countered with a statement stating that students could have chosen to protest after school and outside school, but instead chose to disrupt the school day, which was the sole motivation for the punishments. Police officers who had responded to the scene confirmed that the students were peaceful, and had moved to a side hallway when asked to by school officials to avoid a high traffic area. Three students were suspended for one year, pending alternative school placement, one for two years pending alternative school placement, and a fifth was suspended for two years, and was not to receive any further services from the district. Of the 27 speakers who spoke in the public forum (not all of which were speaking about the expulsion issue), at least 12 spoke directly out against the board decision, and none in favor of it. Rainbow/PUSH became involved, siding with the students. By November 13, the expulsions had been retracted, and all but four students were allowed to return to class (who were allowed to return after their suspensions had ended).

== Academics ==
Morton West's class of 2008 had an average composite ACT score of 17.8. 77.6% of the senior class graduated. Morton West did not make Adequate Yearly Progress (AYP) on the Prairie State Achievement Examination, which with the ACT comprises the state assessments used to fulfill the federal No Child Left Behind Act. Neither the school overall, nor two of its three student subgroups met expectations in reading or mathematics. The school is listed as being in its fifth year of academic watch.

== Athletics ==
Since the 1985–1986 school year, Morton West and Morton East have operated a unified athletics program, recognized by the Illinois High School Association (IHSA) as Berwyn-Cicero (Morton). Teams are stylized as the Mustangs, with school colors of maroon and cream. From 1958—85, Morton West had its own athletic program. Teams were stylized as the Falcons, and school colors were green and white.

== Notable alumni ==
- Luke Gregerson, World Series Champion (2017) and MLB pitcher for the St. Louis Cardinals
- Rich Hosek, television writer
- David J. Kostelancik, American Diplomat
- Jim Peterik is a guitarist, songwriter, and singer known for his work with the bands The Ides of March and Survivor.
- John Sevcik, former Major League Baseball catcher for the Minnesota Twins in 1965
- Jerry Wainwright coached the men's basketball team at DePaul University from 2005 to 2010.
- Mike Taylor class of 1993 NHRA Heritage Series Top Fuel Driver
