= Illinois's 4th congressional district =

U.S. House district for Illinois

Coordinates: 41°49′55″N 87°42′36″W

- Interactive map of district boundaries since January 3, 2023
- Representative: Chuy García; D–Chicago
- Area: 97.0 mi^{2} (251 km^{2})
- Distribution: 100.0% urban; 0.0% rural
- Population (2025): 720,661
- Median household income: $80,790
- Ethnicity: 66.5% Hispanic; 23.4% White; 4.5% Black; 3.9% Asian; 1.3% Two or more races; 0.4% other
- Cook PVI: D+17

The 4th congressional district of Illinois, as defined in 2023, includes part of Cook County. It has been represented by Democrat Chuy García since January 2019, who was elected under its previous configuration.

The previous version of the district, from 2013 to 2023, was featured by The Economist as one of the most strangely drawn and gerrymandered congressional districts in the country. It inspired the "Ugly Gerry" gerrymandering typeface, and has been nicknamed "earmuffs" due to its shape.

That version of the district was created after federal courts ordered the creation of a majority-Hispanic district in the Chicago area. The Republican-dominated Illinois General Assembly responded by packing two majority Hispanic parts of Chicago into a single district.

The 2013–2023 version of the district covered two strips running east–west across the city of Chicago, on the west side continuing into smaller portions of some suburban areas in Cook County, surrounding Illinois's 7th congressional district. The northern portion is largely Puerto Rican, while the southern portion is primarily Mexican-American. These two sections were connected only by a piece of Interstate 294 to the west; the highway was in the district while the surrounding areas were not. This version of the district was the smallest congressional district in area outside New York City and California.

== History ==
The Illinois 4th congressional district was originally formed in 1842. It included 17 counties, which were Cook, Lake, McHenry, Boone, De Kalb, Kane, Du Page, Will, Kendall, Grundy, LaSalle, Bureau, Livingston, Iroquois, McLean, Vermilion and Champaign Counties. Beyond this Ford and Kankakee Counties were part of Vermillion and Iroquois Counties respectively at this point and thus in the district's boundaries.

In the redistricting following the 1990 United States census, Chicago Mayor Richard M. Daley and Governor Jim Edgar both wanted a Latino district, as Latinos were the fastest growing demographic group in the state at the time. In June 1991, Congressman Dennis Hastert, a suburban Republican, filed a federal lawsuit claiming that the existing congressional map was unconstitutional; the present congressional district boundaries emerged as a result of that lawsuit. A three-judge panel of the federal district court adopted the map proposed by Hastert and other Republican members of the Illinois Congressional delegation. Subsequent lawsuits challenging the redistricting as racially biased did not succeed in redrawing the district boundaries. The district, as it was in 2009, was in some places less than 50 yards (metres) wide and parts covered no more than one city block.

== Composition ==
For the 118th and successive Congresses (based on redistricting following the 2020 census), the district contains all or portions of the following counties, townships, and municipalities:

Cook County (34)

Bellwood (part, also 7th), Berkeley (part, also 7th), Berwyn, Berwyn Township, Bridgeview (part, also 6th), Brookfield, Burbank, Burr Ridge (part, also 6th), Cicero, Cicero Township, Chicago (part, also 1st, 2nd, 3rd, 5th, 6th, 7th, 8th, and 9th; shared with DuPage County), Forest View, Franklin Park (part, also 3rd), Hinsdale (part, shared with DuPage County), La Grange (part, also 6th), La Grange Park (part, also 7th), Leyden Township (part, also 3rd), Lyons, Lyons Township (part, also 6th), Maywood (part, also 7th), McCook, Melrose Park, North Riverside (part, also 7th), Northlake, Oak Lawn (part, also 6th), Proviso Township (part, also 7th), River Grove (part, also 3rd), Riverside, Riverside Township, Stickney, Stickney Township (part, also 6th), Stone Park, Summit, Worth Township (part, also 1st and 6th)

DuPage County (6)

Clarendon Hills (part, also 6th), Downers Grove Township (part, also 6th), Elmhurst (part, also 6th), Hinsdale (part, shared with Cook County), Oak Brook (part, also 6th), York Township (part, also 6th)

Chicago neighborhoods within the district include:

- Bridgeport (part)
- Brighton Park
- Chicago Lawn (part)
- Clearing (part)
- Garfield Ridge (part)
- New City (part)
- Pilsen (part)
- South Lawndale
- West Elsdon

== Recent election results from statewide races ==
Year	Office	Results
2008	President	Obama 71% - 28%
2012	President	Obama 72% - 28%
2016	President	Clinton 72% - 22%
2016	Senate	Duckworth 69% - 25%
2016	Comptroller (Spec.)	Mendoza 66% - 27%
2018	Governor	Pritzker 70% - 25%
2018	Attorney General	Raoul 69% - 28%
2018	Secretary of State	White 81% - 16%
2018	Comptroller	Mendoza 76% - 21%
2018	Treasurer	Frerichs 72% - 23%
2020	President	Biden 72% - 26%
2020	Senate	Durbin 69% - 22%
2022	Senate	Duckworth 70% - 28%
2022	Governor	Pritzker 68% - 29%
2022	Attorney General	Raoul 68% - 30%
2022	Secretary of State	Giannoulias 69% - 29%
2022	Comptroller	Mendoza 72% - 26%
2022	Treasurer	Frerichs 68% - 30%
2024	President	Harris 63% - 35%

== History ==
=== 2011 redistricting ===
The 4th district includes the Chicago community of Brighton Park, in addition to almost all of Hermosa, Lower West Side and Gage Park; parts of Albany Park, Irving Park, Avondale, Logan Square, West Town, Humboldt Park, Belmont Cragin, Austin, McKinley Park, South Lawndale, New City, West Elsdon and Archer Heights; portions of riverfront Bridgeport; the portion of North Center southwest of Clybourn Avenue; and the northwestern tip of Lincoln Park. Since the 2011 redistricting, the district also includes portions of Berwyn, Brookfield, Cicero, Lyons, Melrose Park, Riverside, River Forest, and Elmwood Park.

=== Prominent representatives ===
Representative	Notes
John Wentworth	Elected the 21st Mayor of Chicago (1860 – 1861)
William Kellogg	Appointed Chief Justice of the Territorial Supreme Court of the Nebraska Territory (1865 – 1867)
John B. Hawley	Served as a captain for the Union Army during the American Civil War
Daniel W. Mills	Served as a captain for the Union Army during the American Civil War
Stephen A. Hurlbut	Served as a major general for the Union Army during the American Civil War (1861 – 1865); Appointed Minister Resident to the United States of Colombia (1869 – 1872); Appointed Envoy Extraordinary and Minister Plenipotentiary to Peru (1881 – 1882)
Walter C. Newberry	Served as a brigadier general for the Union Army during the American Civil War (1861 – 1865)
Abner C. Harding	Served as a brigadier general for the Union Army during the American Civil War (1862 – 1863)
George M. O'Brien	Served as a lieutenant colonel for the U.S. Army Air Force during World War II (1941 – 1945)

== List of members representing the district ==
Representative	Party	Years	Cong ress	Notes	District location
District created March 4, 1843
John Wentworth (Chicago)	Democratic	March 4, 1843 – March 3, 1851	28th 29th 30th 31st	Elected in 1842. Re-elected in 1844. Re-elected in 1846. Re-elected in 1848. [data missing]	
Richard S. Molony (Belvidere)	Democratic	March 4, 1851 – March 3, 1853	32nd	Elected in 1850. [data missing]	
James Knox (Knoxville)	Whig	March 4, 1853 – March 3, 1855	33rd	Elected in 1852. Re-elected in 1854. [data missing]	
James Knox (Knoxville)	Opposition	March 4, 1855 – March 3, 1857	34th	Elected in 1852. Re-elected in 1854. [data missing]	
William Kellogg (Canton)	Republican	March 4, 1857 – March 3, 1863	35th 36th 37th	Elected in 1856. Re-elected in 1858. Re-elected in 1860. [data missing]	
Charles M. Harris (Oquawka)	Democratic	March 4, 1863 – March 3, 1865	38th	Elected in 1862. [data missing]	
Abner C. Harding (Monmouth)	Republican	March 4, 1865 – March 3, 1869	39th 40th	Elected in 1864. Re-elected in 1866. [data missing]	
John B. Hawley (Rock Island)	Republican	March 4, 1869 – March 3, 1873	41st 42nd	Elected in 1868. Re-elected in 1870. Redistricted to the 6th district.	
Stephen A. Hurlbut (Belvidere)	Republican	March 4, 1873 – March 3, 1877	43rd 44th	Elected in 1872. Re-elected in 1874. [data missing]	
William Lathrop (Rockford)	Republican	March 4, 1877 – March 3, 1879	45th	Elected in 1876. [data missing]	
John C. Sherwin (Aurora)	Republican	March 4, 1879 – March 3, 1883	46th 47th	Elected in 1878. Re-elected in 1880. [data missing]	
George E. Adams (Chicago)	Republican	March 4, 1883 – March 3, 1891	48th 49th 50th 51st	Elected in 1882. Re-elected in 1884. Re-elected in 1886. Re-elected in 1888. [data missing]	
Walter C. Newberry (Chicago)	Democratic	March 4, 1891 – March 3, 1893	52nd	Elected in 1890. [data missing]	
Julius Goldzier (Chicago)	Democratic	March 4, 1893 – March 3, 1895	53rd	Elected in 1892. [data missing]	
Charles W. Woodman (Chicago)	Republican	March 4, 1895 – March 3, 1897	54th	Elected in 1894. [data missing]	
Daniel W. Mills (Chicago)	Republican	March 4, 1897 – March 3, 1899	55th	Elected in 1896. [data missing]	
Thomas Cusack (Chicago)	Democratic	March 4, 1899 – March 3, 1901	56th	Elected in 1898. [data missing]	
James McAndrews (Chicago)	Democratic	March 4, 1901 – March 3, 1903	57th	Elected in 1900. Redistricted to the 5th district.	
George P. Foster (Chicago)	Democratic	March 4, 1903 – March 3, 1905	58th	Redistricted from the 3rd district and re-elected in 1902. [data missing]	
Charles S. Wharton (Chicago)	Republican	March 4, 1905 – March 3, 1907	59th	Elected in 1904. [data missing]	
James T. McDermott (Chicago)	Democratic	March 4, 1907 – July 21, 1914	60th 61st 62nd 63rd	Elected in 1906. Re-elected in 1908. Re-elected in 1910. Re-elected in 1912. Resigned.	
Vacant		July 21, 1914 – March 3, 1915	63rd		
James T. McDermott (Chicago)	Democratic	March 4, 1915 – March 3, 1917	64th	Re-elected in 1914 to fill his own seat. Retired.	
Charles Martin (Chicago)	Democratic	March 4, 1917 – October 28, 1917	65th	Elected in 1916. Died.	
Vacant		October 28, 1917 – April 2, 1918	65th		
John W. Rainey (Chicago)	Democratic	April 2, 1918 – May 4, 1923	65th 66th 67th 68th	Elected to finish Martin's term. Re-elected in 1918. Re-elected in 1920. Re-elected in 1922. Died.	
Vacant		May 4, 1923 – November 6, 1923	68th		
Thomas A. Doyle (Chicago)	Democratic	November 6, 1923 – March 3, 1931	68th 69th 70th 71st	Elected to finish Rainey's term. Re-elected in 1924. Re-elected in 1926. Re-elected in 1928. [data missing]	
Harry P. Beam (Chicago)	Democratic	March 4, 1931 – December 6, 1942	72nd 73rd 74th 75th 76th 77th	Elected in 1930. Re-elected in 1932. Re-elected in 1934. Re-elected in 1936. Re-elected in 1938. Re-elected in 1940. Resigned after being elected judge of the Municipal Court of Chicago.	
Vacant		December 6, 1942 – January 3, 1943	77th		
Martin Gorski (Chicago)	Democratic	January 3, 1943 – January 3, 1949	78th 79th 80th	Elected in 1942. Re-elected in 1944. Re-elected in 1946. Redistricted to the 5th district.	
James V. Buckley (Lansing)	Democratic	January 3, 1949 – January 3, 1951	81st	Elected in 1948. [data missing]	
William E. McVey (Harvey)	Republican	January 3, 1951 – August 10, 1958	82nd 83rd 84th 85th	Elected in 1950. Re-elected in 1952. Re-elected in 1954. Re-elected in 1956. Died.	
Vacant		August 10, 1958 – January 3, 1959	85th		
Ed Derwinski (Flossmoor)	Republican	January 3, 1959 – January 3, 1983	86th 87th 88th 89th 90th 91st 92nd 93rd 94th 95th 96th 97th	Elected in 1958. Re-elected in 1960. Re-elected in 1962. Re-elected in 1964. Re-elected in 1966. Re-elected in 1968. Re-elected in 1970. Re-elected in 1972. Re-elected in 1974. Re-elected in 1976. Re-elected in 1978. Re-elected in 1980. [data missing]	
George M. O'Brien (Joliet)	Republican	January 3, 1983 – July 17, 1986	98th 99th	Redistricted from the 17th district and re-elected in 1982. Re-elected in 1984. Died.	
Vacant		July 17, 1986 – January 3, 1987	99th		
Jack Davis (New Lenox)	Republican	January 3, 1987 – January 3, 1989	100th	Elected in 1986. [data missing]	
George E. Sangmeister (Mokena)	Democratic	January 3, 1989 – January 3, 1993	101st 102nd	Elected in 1988. Re-elected in 1990. Redistricted to the 11th district.	
Luis Gutiérrez (Chicago)	Democratic	January 3, 1993 – January 3, 2019	103rd 104th 105th 106th 107th 108th 109th 110th 111th 112th 113th 114th 115th	Elected in 1992. Re-elected in 1994. Re-elected in 1996. Re-elected in 1998. Re-elected in 2000. Re-elected in 2002. Re-elected in 2004. Re-elected in 2006. Re-elected in 2008. Re-elected in 2010. Re-elected in 2012. Re-elected in 2014. Re-elected in 2016. Retired.	
Luis Gutiérrez (Chicago)	Democratic	January 3, 1993 – January 3, 2019	103rd 104th 105th 106th 107th 108th 109th 110th 111th 112th 113th 114th 115th	Elected in 1992. Re-elected in 1994. Re-elected in 1996. Re-elected in 1998. Re-elected in 2000. Re-elected in 2002. Re-elected in 2004. Re-elected in 2006. Re-elected in 2008. Re-elected in 2010. Re-elected in 2012. Re-elected in 2014. Re-elected in 2016. Retired.	2003–2013
Luis Gutiérrez (Chicago)	Democratic	January 3, 1993 – January 3, 2019	103rd 104th 105th 106th 107th 108th 109th 110th 111th 112th 113th 114th 115th	Elected in 1992. Re-elected in 1994. Re-elected in 1996. Re-elected in 1998. Re-elected in 2000. Re-elected in 2002. Re-elected in 2004. Re-elected in 2006. Re-elected in 2008. Re-elected in 2010. Re-elected in 2012. Re-elected in 2014. Re-elected in 2016. Retired.	2013–2023
Chuy García (Chicago)	Democratic	January 3, 2019 – present	116th 117th 118th 119th	Elected in 2018. Re-elected in 2020. Re-elected in 2022. Re-elected in 2024. Retiring at the end of term.	2013–2023
Chuy García (Chicago)	Democratic	January 3, 2019 – present	116th 117th 118th 119th	Elected in 2018. Re-elected in 2020. Re-elected in 2022. Re-elected in 2024. Retiring at the end of term.	2023–present
Patty García (Chicago)	Democratic	Assuming office on January 3, 2027		Elected in 2026.	2023–present

== Election results ==
=== 1992 ===
1994 Illinois's 4th congressional district election
Party	Candidate	Votes	%
Democratic	Luis Gutierrez	90,452	77.6
Republican	Hildegarde Rodriguez-Schieman	26,154	22.4
Total votes		116,606	100.00
Democratic hold			

=== 1994 ===
1994 Illinois's 4th congressional district election
Party	Candidate	Votes	%
Democratic	Luis Gutierrez (incumbent)	46,695	75.2
Republican	Steven Valtierra	15,384	24.8
Total votes		62,079	100.00
Democratic hold			

=== 1996 ===
1996 Illinois's 4th congressional district election
Party	Candidate	Votes	%
Democratic	Luis Gutierrez (incumbent)	85,278	93.6
Libertarian	William Passmore	5,857	6.4
Total votes		91,135	100.00
Democratic hold			

=== 1998 ===
1998 Illinois's 4th congressional district election
Party	Candidate	Votes	%
Democratic	Luis Gutierrez (incumbent)	54,244	81.7
Republican	John Birch	10,529	15.9
Libertarian	William Passmore	1,583	2.4
Total votes		66,356	100.00
Democratic hold			

=== 2000 ===
2000 Illinois's 4th congressional district election
Party	Candidate	Votes	%
Democratic	Luis Gutierrez (incumbent)	89,487	88.6
Libertarian	Stephanie Sailor	11,476	11.4
Total votes		100,963	100.00
Democratic hold			

=== 2002 ===
2002 Illinois's 4th congressional district election
Party	Candidate	Votes	%
Democratic	Luis Gutierrez (incumbent)	67,339	79.7
Republican	Anthony J. Lopez-Cisneros	12,778	15.1
Libertarian	Maggie Kohls	4,396	5.2
Total votes		84,513	100.00
Democratic hold			

=== 2004 ===
2004 Illinois's 4th congressional district election
Party	Candidate	Votes	%
Democratic	Luis Gutierrez (incumbent)	104,761	83.7
Republican	Anthony J. Lopez-Cisneros	15,536	12.4
Libertarian	Jake Witmer	4,845	3.9
Total votes		125,142	100.00
Democratic hold			

=== 2006 ===
2006 Illinois's 4th congressional district election
Party	Candidate	Votes	%
Democratic	Luis Gutierrez (incumbent)	69,910	85.84
Republican	Ann Melichar	11,532	14.16
Total votes		81,442	100.00
Democratic hold			

=== 2008 ===
Illinois's 4th congressional district election, 2008
Party	Candidate	Votes	%
Democratic	Luis Gutierrez (incumbent)	112,529	80.60
Republican	Daniel Cunninghan	16,024	11.48
Green	Omar N. López	11,053	7.92
Total votes		139,606	100.00
Democratic hold			

=== 2010 ===
Illinois's 4th district general election, November 2, 2010
Party	Candidate	Votes	%
Democratic	Luis Gutiérrez (incumbent)	63,273	77.36
Republican	Israel Vasquez	11,711	14.32
Green	Robert J. Burns	6,808	8.32
Total votes		81,792	100.00
Democratic hold			

=== 2012 ===
Illinois's 4th congressional district, 2012
Party	Candidate	Votes	%
Democratic	Luis Gutiérrez (incumbent)	133,226	83.0
Republican	Héctor Concepción	27,279	17.0
Independent	Ymelda Viramontes	4	0.0
Total votes		160,509	100.0
Democratic hold			

=== 2014 ===
Illinois's 4th congressional district, 2014
Party	Candidate	Votes	%
Democratic	Luis Gutiérrez (incumbent)	79,666	78.1
Republican	Hector Concepción	22,278	21.9
Total votes		101,944	100.0
Democratic hold			

=== 2016 ===
Illinois's 4th congressional district, 2016
Party	Candidate	Votes	%
Democratic	Luis Gutiérrez (incumbent)	171,297	100
Total votes		171,297	100.0m
Democratic hold			

=== 2018 ===
Illinois's 4th congressional district, 2018
Party	Candidate	Votes	%
Democratic	Jesús "Chuy" García	143,895	86.6
Republican	Mark Lorch	22,294	13.4
Total votes		166,189	100.0
Democratic hold			

=== 2020 ===
Illinois's 4th congressional district, 2020
Party	Candidate	Votes	%	±%
Democratic	Jesús "Chuy" García (incumbent)	187,219	84.05	−2.54%
Republican	Jesus E. Solorio Jr.	35,518	15.95	+2.54%
Total votes		222,737	100.0	
Democratic hold				

=== 2022 ===
Illinois's 4th congressional district, 2022
Party	Candidate	Votes	%
Democratic	Jesús "Chuy" García (incumbent)	91,036	68.42
Republican	James Falakos	37,352	28.07
Working Class	Edward Hershey	4,605	3.46
Write-in		54	0.041
Total votes		133,047	100.0
Democratic hold			

=== 2024 ===
Illinois's 4th congressional district, 2024
Party	Candidate	Votes	%	±%
Democratic	Jesús "Chuy" García (incumbent)	139,343	67.51	−0.91%
Republican	Lupe Castillo	56,323	27.29	−0.78%
Working Class	Edward Hershey	10,704	5.19	+1.73%
Total votes		206,396	100.0	
Democratic hold				

== See also ==
- Illinois's congressional districts
- List of United States congressional districts
- Gerrymandering
- United States House of Representatives elections in Illinois, 2006
- United States House of Representatives elections in Illinois, 2008
- United States House of Representatives elections in Illinois, 2010
- United States House of Representatives elections in Illinois, 2012
- United States House of Representatives elections in Illinois, 2014
- United States House of Representatives elections in Illinois, 2016
