= Cook County Republican Party =

Political party in Illinois, U.S.

- Chairperson: Terrance Carr
- National affiliation: Republican Party
- Regional affiliation: Illinois Republican Party
- Colors: Red
- Chicago City Council: 0 / 50
- Cook County Board of Commissioners: 1 / 17

Website
- cookrepublicanparty.com

The Cook County Republican Party is an American county-level political party organization which represents voters in 50 wards in the city of Chicago and 30 suburban townships of Cook County, Illinois. Cook County is the second-most populous county in the United States.

== Organization and leadership ==
The current chairman, Terrance Carr, was elected to the position by the committeemen in 2026.

=== Committeepeople ===
As of April 2024:

Constituency (ward, township, or equivalent)	Committeeperson	Assumed position	Other office(s) held
1st Ward	Vacant	—N/a	—N/a
2nd Ward	C.J. Gallo		none
3rd Ward	Al Rasho	—N/a	—N/a
4th Ward	Paul McKinley		none
5th Ward	Tyler Shasteen		none
6th Ward	Charles Earl Williams		none
7th Ward	Dave Lottich	—N/a	—N/a
8th Ward	Lynn Renee Franco		none
9th Ward	Wayland Johnson		none
10th Ward	Yolanda DeAnda	—N/a	—N/a
11th Ward	Mike Bendas		none
12th Ward	Vacant		none
13th Ward	Vacant	—N/a	—N/a
14th Ward	Vacant		none
15th Ward	Rosa Pritchett		none
16th Ward	Leonard Griffin		none
17th Ward	Vacant		none
18th Ward	Devin Jones		none
19th Ward	Declan Smith		none
20th Ward	Maurissa Langon	—N/a	—N/a
21st Ward	Ronnie Fields	—N/a	—N/a
22nd Ward	Lupe Castillo	—N/a	—N/a
23rd Ward	Carlos Alvarez	—N/a	—N/a
24th Ward	Vacant	—N/a	—N/a
25th Ward	Vacant		none
26th Ward	Vacant		none
27th Ward	Vacant		none
28th Ward	Tamiko Holt		none
29th Ward	Walter Adamczyk	—N/a	—N/a
30th Ward	Edward Karecki	—N/a	—N/a
31st Ward	Ramona T. Bonilla-Anaiel		none
32nd Ward	Vacant		none
33rd Ward	Jason Proctor		none
34th Ward	Chris Meyers		none
35th Ward	Gladys Tanchez		none
36th Ward	Vacant	—N/a	—N/a
37th Ward	Velda Brunner	—N/a	—N/a
38th Ward	Chuck Hernandez		none
39th Ward	Barry Bebart		none
40th Ward	Vacant		none
41st Ward	Ammie Kessem		none
42nd Ward	Kurt Fujio		none
43rd Ward	Brian Kasal		none
44th Ward	Laura Kotelman		none
45th Ward	Estela B. Richards	—N/a	—N/a
46th Ward	Vacant		none
47th Ward	Gary Mandell		none
48th Ward	Vacant	—N/a	—N/a
49th Ward	James Hazard		none
50th Ward	Daniel J. Kelly	—N/a	—N/a
Barrington Township	Peter Kopsaftis	May 15, 2020	none
Berwyn Township	Joe Woodward	—N/a	—N/a
Bloom Township	Lisa Kristina	—N/a	—N/a
Bremen Township	Max Solomon		none
Calumet Township	Vacant	—N/a	—N/a
Cicero Township	Sandra Tomschin		none
Elk Grove Township	Ed Lapinski		none
Evanston	Sean Matlis		none
Hanover Township	Michael H. Baumer		Streamwood Village Trustee
Lemont Township	Michael Shackel		Lemont Township Trustee
Leyden Township	Bradley Stephens		Member of the Illinois House of Representatives and Mayor of Rosemont
Lyons Township	Terrance Carr		none
Maine Township	James T. Stinson		none
New Trier Township	Julie Cho		none
Niles Township	Chris Hanusiak		none
Northfield Township	T.J. Brown		none
Norwood Park Township	George Ballis		none
Oak Park Township	John Bergholz		none
Orland Township	Cindy Nelson Katsenes		none
Palatine Township	Aaron Del Mar		Palatine Township Highway Commissioner
Palos Township	Sean M. Morrison		Member of the Cook County Board of Commissioners and Chairman of the Cook County Republican Party
Proviso Township	Mike Corrigan		none
Rich Township	Eric Wallace		none
River Forest Township	Tom Cronin		none
Riverside Township	Jay Reyes		none
Schaumburg Township	Joseph C. Folisi		none
Stickney Township	Natasa Dzolic		Member of Stickney, Illinois Parks & Recreation Advisory Commission
Thornton Township	Tim DeYoung		none
Wheeling Township	Kathy Penner		Wheeling Township Supervisor
Worth Township	Shaun Murphy		none

== Chairs ==
Chair	Tenure
James R. Mann	1902
Bernard W. Snow	
David H. Jackson	1906–1907
Charles W. Andrews	1907–1912
John F. Devine	1912—1914
Donald F. Matchett	1914–
Edward F. Moore	
John L. East	1950–1951
Hayes Robertson	circa 1960s
Virginia B. MacDonald	
Floyd T. Fulle	c. 1975
J. Robert Barr	1978-1985
Donald L. Totten	1985–March 1988
James Dvorak	March 1988–April 1990
Richard Siebel	April 1990–March 1992
Manny Hoffman	March 1992 – 2002
Maureen Murphy	2002–April 2004
Gary J. Skoien	April 2004 – 2007
Elizabeth Ann Doody Gorman	2007–2008
Lee Roupas	2008–2011
Sig Vaznelis	September 2011–April 2012
Aaron Del Mar	April 2012– April 2016
Sean M. Morrison	April 2016–April 2025
Aaron Del Mar	April 2025–April 2026
Terrance Carr	April 2026-present

== See also ==
- Cook County Democratic Party
- Political history of Chicago
