= Nottingham Park, Illinois =

Unincorporated community in Cook County, Illinois

- Unincorporated community
- Location within Illinois
- Coordinates: 41.7770°N 87.7991°W
- Country: United States
- State: Illinois
- County: Cook
- Township: Stickney
- Elevation: 722 ft (220 m)
- Time zone: UTC-6 (Central (CST))
  - Summer (DST): UTC-5 (CDT)
- Area code: 708

Nottingham Park is an unincorporated community in Stickney Township, Cook County, Illinois, United States. The center of the community is located near Burbank between Harlem Avenue (IL-43) and Sayre Avenue from 71st to 75th Streets. In addition to Burbank on its southeast, it is bordered by the villages of Bedford Park to the north and east and Bridgeview to the west and south. It takes its name from the nearby green. It is sometimes mistakenly considered part of Chicago due to a shared zip code. However, "Nottingham Park" or "Stickney Township" is still an acceptable mailing address. Students from the community attend schools in Burbank School District 111 and then Reavis High School.
