= Pershing Road (Chicago) =

Street in Chicago, Illinois, United States

Pershing Road (39th Street)
- John J. Pershing Road; 3900 South
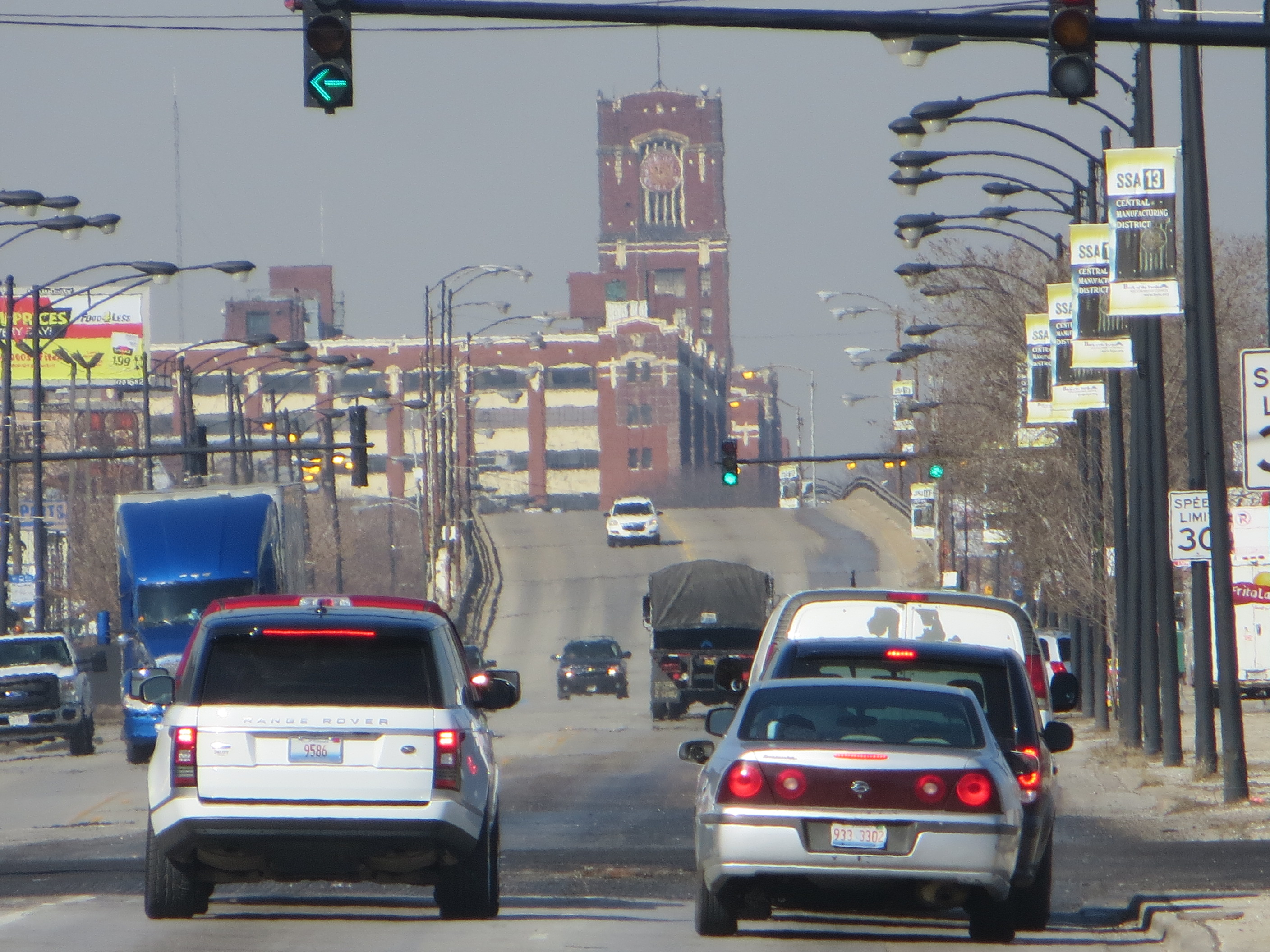
- Facing west at Pershing Road/Halsted Street
- Length: 3.39 miles (5.46 km) (western segment); 5.79 miles (9.32 km) (eastern segment); 9.18 miles (14.77 km) (total)
- Location: Chicago
- West end: Before Highland Avenue in Downers Grove, Illinois
- East end: Oakwood Boulevard in Chicago

Pershing Road is an east-west street on the south side of Chicago and in its immediate western suburbs in Cook County, Illinois. It is precisely four miles south of Madison Street, the division point between north and south street numbering, and marks the 3900 South point in the region's street numbering system. Its western segment, more commonly referred to as 39th Street, runs east from a U.S. Route 34 (Ogden Avenue) in Lyons to Illinois Route 50 (Cicero Avenue) in Cicero. Its eastern segment, officially known as Pershing Road, runs east from a cul-de-sac at 3600 West to Oakwood Boulevard, which continues east ending at U.S. Route 41 (Lake Shore Drive). All of the eastern segment lies within the city of Chicago.

In the suburbs, 39th Street constitutes the boundary between several of Cook County's townships. West of Harlem Avenue, Proviso and Riverside Townships are on the north and Lyons Township is on the south; east of Harlem, Berwyn and Cicero Townships are on the north and Stickney Township is on the south.

In DuPage County, The entire route segment borders Downers Grove Township on the north and York Township on the south.

== Route description ==
39th Street starts as a small residential road in Downers Grove in a wooded neighborhood. It runs for approximately 1.9 miles while intersecting with Highland Avenue and Fairview avenue before interruption in a neighborhood after Washington Street by a retention area for the major DuPage County route. Three smaller unconnected routes are in Westmont, Western Springs and Lyons.

It resumes in Cook County at Wolf Road in Western Springs as a residential road connecting to Gilbert Avenue. Afterward, its next major segment starts at U.S. Route 34 (Ogden Avenue) in Lyons. While still in Lyons, 39th Street intersects with Illinois Route 43 (Harlem Avenue). The road continues east until it intersects Illinois Route 50 (Cicero Avenue) in Cicero.

39th Street and Pershing Road are split into two segments because Interstate 55 (Stevenson Expressway) runs in its path if it were to continue in either direction.

Pershing Road begins at a cul-de-sac at 3600 West, just west of St. Louis Avenue in Chicago. Continuing east, Pershing Road intersects Kedzie Avenue, Archer Avenue, and Halsted Street. About three-fourths of a mile east of Halsted Street, Pershing Road intersects Interstate 90/Interstate 94 (Dan Ryan Expressway). The street finally ends at Oakwood Boulevard, which continues east until its terminus at U.S. Route 41 (Lake Shore Drive) in Burnham Park.

== History ==
Both segments of Pershing Road/39th Street were once called just 39th Street. The eastern segment was renamed to honor American general John J. Pershing December 8, 1920. It had previously been known as Egan Street, named for William Bradshaw Egan.

== Transportation ==
In Chicago, Pershing Road is mainly served by 39 Pershing, a bus route that travels from St. Louis Avenue east of Corwith Yard to Lake Park Avenue west of the lakefront. The route briefly leaves and reenters Pershing Road for 35th/Archer and Sox–35th stations.

== Major intersections ==
County	Location	mi	km	Destinations	Notes
DuPage	Downers Grove	0.4	0.64	CR 9 (Highland Avenue (north) Main Street (south))	Western terminus, begins 0.4 miles prior in residential neighborhood.
DuPage	Downers Grove	0.8	1.3	CR 25 (Fairview Avenue)	
DuPage	Westmont	1.5	2.4		Dead ends at retention area in residential neighborhood
Gap in route
Cook	Western Springs	1.5	2.4	CR W22 (Wolf Road)	
Cook	Western Springs–La Grange– La Grange Park tripoint	2.5	4.0	Gilbert Avenue	
Cook	Gap in route				
Cook	Riverside–Lyons line	2.5	4.0	US 34 (Ogden Avenue)	Resumes as right fork from Ogden Avenue
Cook	Lyons–Berwyn– Stickney tripoint	2.8	4.5	Historic US 66 (Will Rogers Highway) / IL 43 (Harlem Avenue)	
Cook	Stickney–Cicero line	5.2	8.4	CR W39 south (Central Avenue)	
Cook	Stickney–Cicero– Chicago tripoint	6.2	10.0	IL 50 (Cicero Avenue)	
Cook	Gap in route				
Cook	Chicago	9.6	15.4	Cul-de-sac west of South St. Louis Avenue	
Cook	Chicago	14	23	South Racine Avenue	Interchange
Cook	Chicago	19.4	31.2	CR W94 (California Avenue)	
Cook	Chicago	20.9	33.6	CR W48 (Ashland Avenue)	
Cook	Chicago	21.7	34.9	I-90 / I-94 (Dan Ryan Expressway)	
Cook	Chicago	30.7	49.4	East Oakwood Boulevard	Eastern terminus; roadway continues as East Oakwood Boulevard towards Lake Shore Drive
1.000 mi = 1.609 km; 1.000 km = 0.621 mi
