= Central Stickney, Illinois =

- Unincorporated community
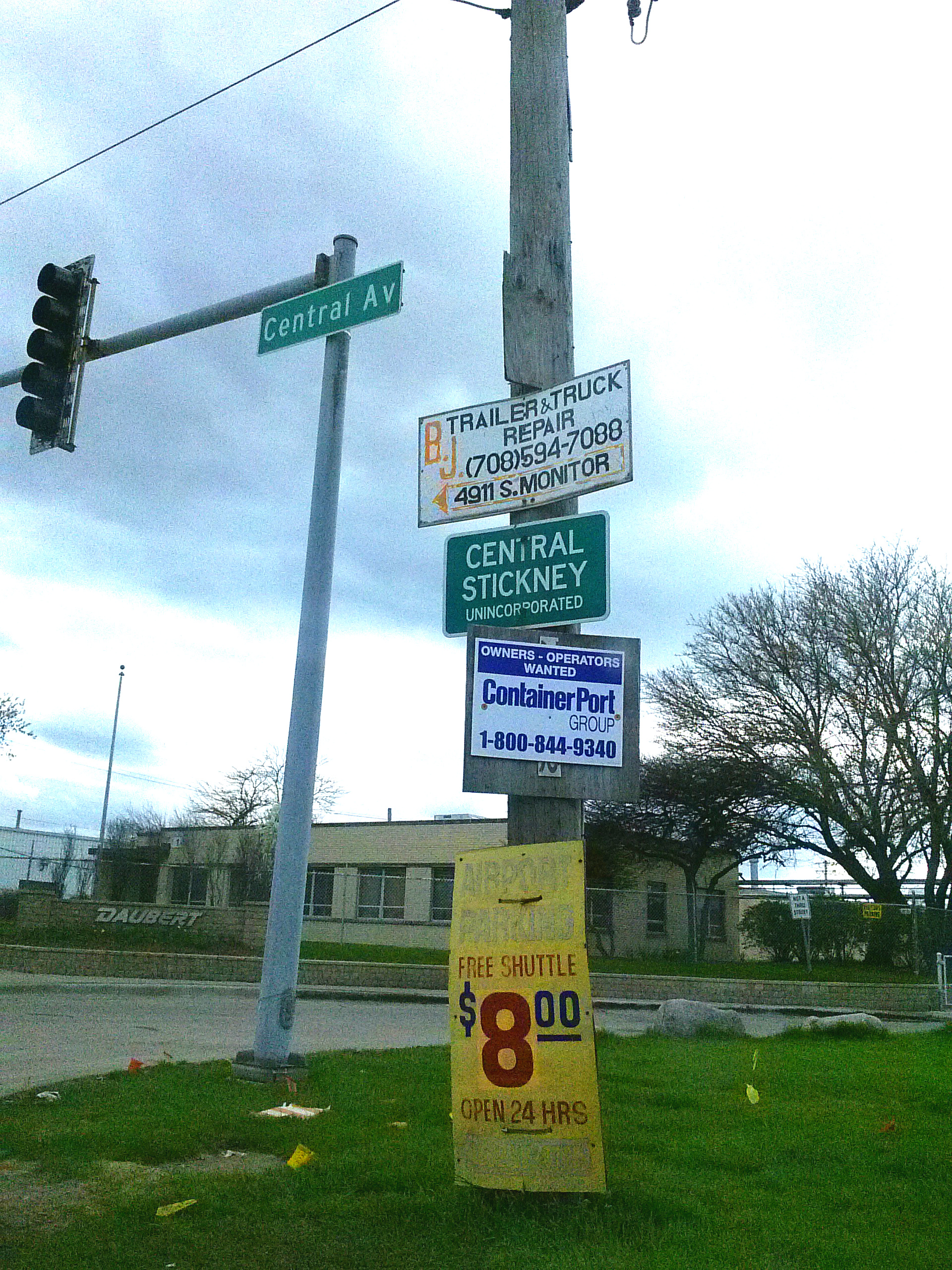
- Boundary of Central Stickney, Illinois, just southwest of Chicago

- Location within Illinois
- Coordinates: 41.8073°N 87.7626°W
- Country: United States
- State: Illinois
- County: Cook
- Township: Stickney
- Elevation: 722 ft (220 m)
- Time zone: UTC-6 (Central (CST))
  - Summer (DST): UTC-5 (CDT)
- ZIP code: 60638 (Chicago)
- Area code: 708

Central Stickney is an unincorporated community in Stickney Township, Cook County, Illinois, a half mile north of Midway International Airport. It consists of the areas around Central Avenue, between I-55 to the north and 51st Street, its southern boundary; east of Central, the northern boundary is roughly drawn between 47th and 48th Streets. It is bordered by the village of Forest View to the north and the Chicago community of Garfield Ridge to the south and east. The area consists of a residential neighborhood of approximately 150 acres to the east of Central Avenue and a business park to the west, as well as several small businesses along Central. It is served by the Central Stickney Fire Protection District and the Central Stickney Park District. Central Stickney has been trying to incorporate for many years, but faces possible annexation to the City of Chicago.

== Education ==
Central Stickney has one public school, Charles J. Sahs Elementary School, which serves grades K-8; it is the only school in Central Stickney School District 110. Students then attend Reavis High School in Burbank, four miles to the south, for grades 9–12.

Central Stickney is also in the Moraine Valley Community College District 524.
