= Stickney Township, Illinois =

Stickney Township
- Township
- Flag Seal

- Location in Cook County

- Cook County's location in Illinois
- Coordinates: 41°46′24″N 87°46′07″W
- Country: United States
- State: Illinois
- County: Cook
- Established: 1901

Area
  - Total: 12.67 sq mi (32.8 km^{2})
  - Land: 12.48 sq mi (32.3 km^{2})
  - Water: 0.19 sq mi (0.49 km^{2}) 1.52%
- Elevation: 614 ft (187 m)

Population (2020)
  - Total: 41,514
  - Density: 3,326/sq mi (1,284/km^{2})
- Time zone: UTC-6 (CST)
  - Summer (DST): UTC-5 (CDT)
- ZIP codes: 60402, 60455, 60459, 60629, 60638, 60804
- FIPS code: 17-031-72689
- Website: www.townshipofstickney.org

Stickney Township is one of 29 townships in Cook County, Illinois. As of the 2020 census, its population was 41,514, with approximately 71% of that total living in the city of Burbank (pop. 29,439).

Township offices are located at 5635 W. State Road in Burbank. Other municipalities in the township include Stickney (pop. 7,110) and Forest View (pop. 792), and the largely industrial eastern half of Bedford Park, as well as some small portions of Bridgeview. The unincorporated communities of Central Stickney and Nottingham Park are also within the township. Stickney Township's approximate borders are Pershing Road (39th Street) on the north, Cicero Avenue on the east, 87th Street on the south, and Harlem Avenue on the west, excepting those areas in the Chicago communities of Garfield Ridge and Clearing (which include Chicago Midway International Airport), but also including the area between Laramie and Cicero Avenues as far north as 35th Street, where Hawthorne Race Course is located. The Chicago Sanitary and Ship Canal, designated a National Historic District in 2011, passes through the northwest corner of the township.

== Geography ==
According to the 2021 census gazetteer files, Stickney Township has a total area of 12.67 square miles (32.82 km^{2}), of which 12.48 square miles (32.32 km^{2}) (or 98.48%) is land and 0.19 square miles (0.49 km^{2}) (or 1.52%) is water.

=== Borders ===
Stickney Township is bordered on the north by Berwyn and Cicero townships, on the west by Lyons Township, and on the south by Worth Township. On the east, it is bordered by the Chicago communities of West Lawn and Ashburn, as well as portions of the Garfield Ridge and Clearing communities that separate Stickney Township's two regions. Stickney Township was originally part of Lake Township, until much of its area was annexed by the city of Chicago in 1889; afterward, the remaining area became part of Lyons Township until 1901.

=== Cities, towns, villages ===
- Bedford Park (east three-quarters)
- Bridgeview (small portion)
- Burbank
- Cicero (unincorporated parts)
- Forest View
- Stickney

=== Unincorporated towns ===
- Central Stickney at 41.8017205°N 87.7577501°W
- Glenn at 41.804760°N 87.777560°W
- Nottingham Park at 41.759099°N 87.797706°W

What became the southwest projection of the city of Chicago was within this township geographically until the area was annexed. The north segment contains several industrial districts bordered by the Stevenson Expressway to the north, 51st Street to the south and Central Avenue to the east.

=== Adjacent townships ===
- Berwyn Township (north)
- Cicero Township (north)
- Worth Township (south)
- Palos Township (southwest)
- Lyons Township (west)
- Riverside Township (northwest)

=== Cemeteries ===
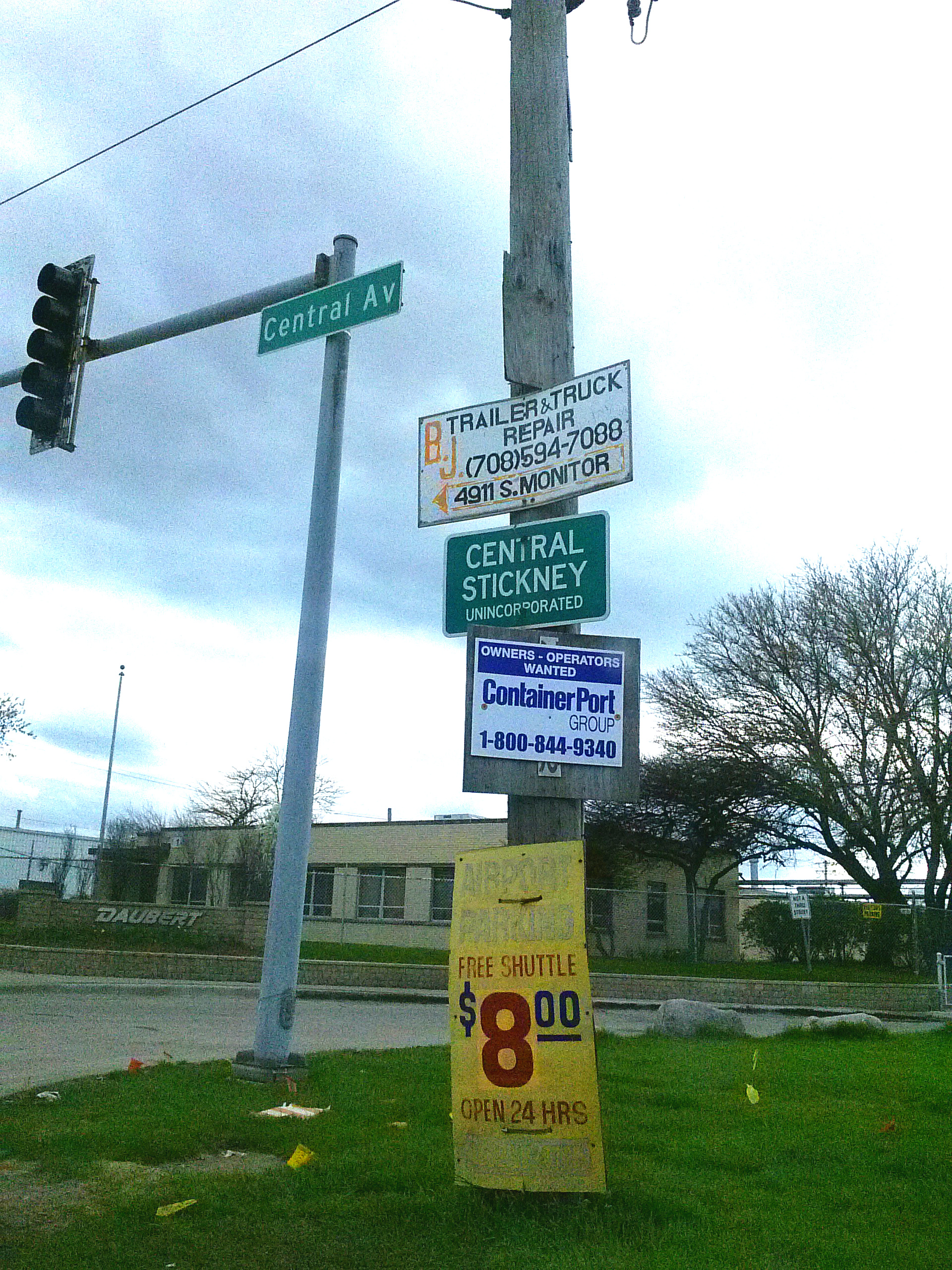
A cluttered signpost at Central Avenue near I-55, noting the boundary of Central Stickney, Illinois, just southwest of Chicago

The township contains Mount Auburn Memorial Cemetery.

=== Major highways ===
- Interstate 55
- Illinois Route 43
- Illinois Route 50

=== Airports and landing strips ===
- Rose Packing Company Heliport

=== Landmarks ===
- Hawthorne Race Course

== Demographics ==
As of the 2020 census there were 41,514 people, 13,090 households, and 9,827 families residing in the township. The population density was 3,275.78 inhabitants per square mile (1,264.79/km^{2}). There were 13,952 housing units at an average density of 1,100.92 per square mile (425.07/km^{2}). The racial makeup of the township was 54.96% White, 2.06% African American, 1.97% Native American, 2.71% Asian, 0.04% Pacific Islander, 21.23% from other races, and 17.03% from two or more races. Hispanic or Latino of any race were 45.91% of the population.

There were 13,090 households, out of which 36.40% had children under the age of 18 living with them, 52.26% were married couples living together, 13.87% had a female householder with no spouse present, and 24.93% were non-families. 22.50% of all households were made up of individuals, and 10.70% had someone living alone who was 65 years of age or older. The average household size was 3.04 and the average family size was 3.56.

The township's age distribution consisted of 25.8% under the age of 18, 8.2% from 18 to 24, 27.4% from 25 to 44, 24.2% from 45 to 64, and 14.4% who were 65 years of age or older. The median age was 38.0 years. For every 100 females, there were 106.0 males. For every 100 females age 18 and over, there were 105.4 males.

The median income for a household in the township was $67,223, and the median income for a family was $76,811. Males had a median income of $45,313 versus $31,922 for females. The per capita income for the township was $27,536. About 7.1% of families and 10.0% of the population were below the poverty line, including 15.9% of those under age 18 and 7.2% of those age 65 or over.

Historical population
Census	Pop.	Note	%±
1910	962		—
1920	877		−8.8%
1930	2,500		185.1%
1940	4,457		78.3%
1950	11,079		148.6%
1960	31,404		183.5%
1970	41,752		33.0%
1980	38,757		−7.2%
1990	37,297		−3.8%
2000	38,673		3.7%
2010	40,772		5.4%
2020	41,514		1.8%
U.S. Decennial Census

== Education ==
Students south of I-55 (Stevenson Expressway) attend schools in Central Stickney School District 110 (Charles J. Sahs Elementary School) and Burbank School District 111, followed by Reavis High School. Students in the more lightly populated area north of I-55 attend schools in Lyons School District 103, then Morton West High School in Berwyn.

== Politics ==
From 1973 to 2025, the township supervisor was Louis Viverito of Burbank; a longtime ally of Illinois House Speaker Mike Madigan, whose district overlapped his own, Viverito also served as the township's Cook County Democratic committeeman from 1969 to February 2007, and as an Illinois state senator from 1995 to 2011. In 2025, his daughter Diane Viverito was elected to succeed him as township supervisor; his son Dean served as Burbank's city treasurer from 2001 to 2021, when Dean was succeeded by his own son David.

The area is known for being populated by conservative Democrats; although Democrats routinely win local elections, Stickney Township was one of five townships in Cook County to vote for Donald Trump in the 2024 presidential election, by a margin of 51%-48% (53%-45% in the precincts south of I-55, but losing north of I-55 in the village of Stickney by 41%-58%), even as Democrats won local Congressional races by 16 points.

=== Political districts ===
- Illinois's 4th congressional district
- Illinois's 6th congressional district
- State House District 21
- State House District 22
- State House District 23
- State House District 31
- State Senate District 11
- State Senate District 12
- State Senate District 16

=== Supervisors ===
- Dr. Robert L. Smith (1961-?)
- Howard T. Scheulin (?-1973)
- Louis S. Viverito (1973-2025)
- Diane M. Viverito (2025-)

== Notable people ==
- Ralph A. Beezhold (1927-2007), Illinois state representative and businessman, lived in Stickney Township.
- Willy Roy (born 1943), National Soccer Hall of Fame, grew up in unincorporated Stickney Township.
