= J. Robert Barr =

American farmer and politician

Member of the Illinois House of Representatives
- In office 1981–1983

Chair of the Cook County Republican Party
- In office 1978-1985
- Preceded by: Virginia B. MacDonald
- Succeeded by: Donald L. Totten

Personal details
- Born: J. Robert Barr
- Party: Republican
- Education: Grinnell College (BA); Harvard Law School (LL.B)
- Profession: Lawyer

J. Robert Barr is an American lawyer and politician.

Barr attended Grinnell College and Harvard Law School. He was the chair of the Cook County Republican Party from 1978 to 1985. He went on to serve in the Illinois House of Representatives from 1981 to 1983 and was a Republican.
