= Illinois Festival of Racing =

The Illinois Festival of Racing, held at Hawthorne Race Course in Stickney/Cicero, Illinois, is a series of six horse races run for and restricted to Illinois (conceived or foaled) state-bred Thoroughbred race horses. The event usually takes place in November just after the Breeders' Cup series.

== The Six Races ==
Race name	Distance/Surface	Restrictions	Purse
The Lightning Jet Handicap	6 furlongs - dirt	3-year-olds & up	$100,000a
The Buck's Boy Handicap	1 and 1/16 mile - dirt	3-year-olds & up	$100,000a
The Showtime Deb Stakes	6 furlongs - dirt	2-year-old fillies	$100,000a
The Sun Power Stakes	6 furlongs - dirt	2-year-old & up colts & geldings	$100,000a
The Powerless Handicap	6 furlongs - dirt	3-year-olds & up (either gender)	$100,000a
The Illini Princess Handicap	1 and 1/16 miles - dirt	3-year-olds and up	$100,000a
