= Burbank School District =

Burbank School District may refer to:

- Burbank Unified School District (California)
- Burbank School District 111 (Illinois)
- Burbank School District 20 (Oklahoma)
