= Bobby Madritsch =

American baseball player (born 1976)

- Pitcher
- Born: February 28, 1976 (age 50); Oak Lawn, Illinois, U.S.
- Batted: Left Threw: Left

MLB debut
- July 21, 2004, for the Seattle Mariners

Last MLB appearance
- April 6, 2005, for the Seattle Mariners

MLB statistics
- Win–loss record: 6–4
- Earned run average: 3.41
- Strikeouts: 61
- Stats at Baseball Reference

Teams
- Seattle Mariners (2004–2005)

Robert Allen Madritsch (born February 28, 1976) is an American former professional baseball pitcher. He played parts of two seasons in Major League Baseball for the Seattle Mariners, and most recently played for the Long Island Ducks of the Atlantic League in 2008.

== Baseball career ==
Madritsch attended Reavis High School in Burbank, Illinois, where he was All-Conference two consecutive years. He then attended Moraine Valley Community College and Point Park University.

He was drafted by the Cincinnati Reds in the sixth round of the 1998 Major League Baseball draft. He pitched for the Billings Mustangs in 1998, then the Gulf Coast League Reds and Dayton Dragons in 2000. The Reds released him on March 24, 2001.

In 2001 and 2002, Madritsch played independent ball with the Winnipeg Goldeyes of the Northern League; the Chico Heat of the Western Baseball League; and the Rio Grande Valley WhiteWings, and San Angelo Colts of the Texas–Louisiana League.

On September 23, 2002, the Seattle Mariners purchased Madritsch's contract from Winnipeg. He made his MLB debut on July 21, 2004. After four relief appearances, he joined the starting rotation. In 2004, he had a 6–3 record and 3.23 ERA in 15 games. He made only one start in 2005, allowing 3 runs and not finishing the fifth inning. He felt discomfort in his arm and left the game. He then went on the 15-day disabled list. He would not pitch in the majors again. The Mariners waived him in October.

On October 21, 2005, the Kansas City Royals claimed Madritsch off waivers and assigned to the minor leagues. He was released by the Royals on September 1, 2006. Beset by injuries, Madritsch did not pitch for four years.

Madritsch signed with the Long Island Ducks of the Atlantic League on August 2, 2008. He pitched twice for the Ducks, working a total of one scoreless inning, before retiring from professional baseball.

== Awards ==
- 2002 – Independent Leagues All-Star SP, Independent League Player of the Year, Northern League Western Division All-Star LHP
- 2003 – Texas League All-Star P
- 2004 – MLB All-Rookie All-Star P

== Personal life ==
Madritsch was raised by his father and did not know his mother, who was Lakota. He admitted to getting into a lot of trouble as a teen: "I was always playing with fire and getting burned all the time" – and said he finally turned things around after getting badly hurt: "I knew right from wrong after that."

In March 2012, Madritsch was working with his brother Ken in Burbank, Illinois with a Little League baseball team.

Madritsch has 20 tattoos.
