= Robert Vial House =

Historic house in Illinois, United States

- U.S. National Register of Historic Places
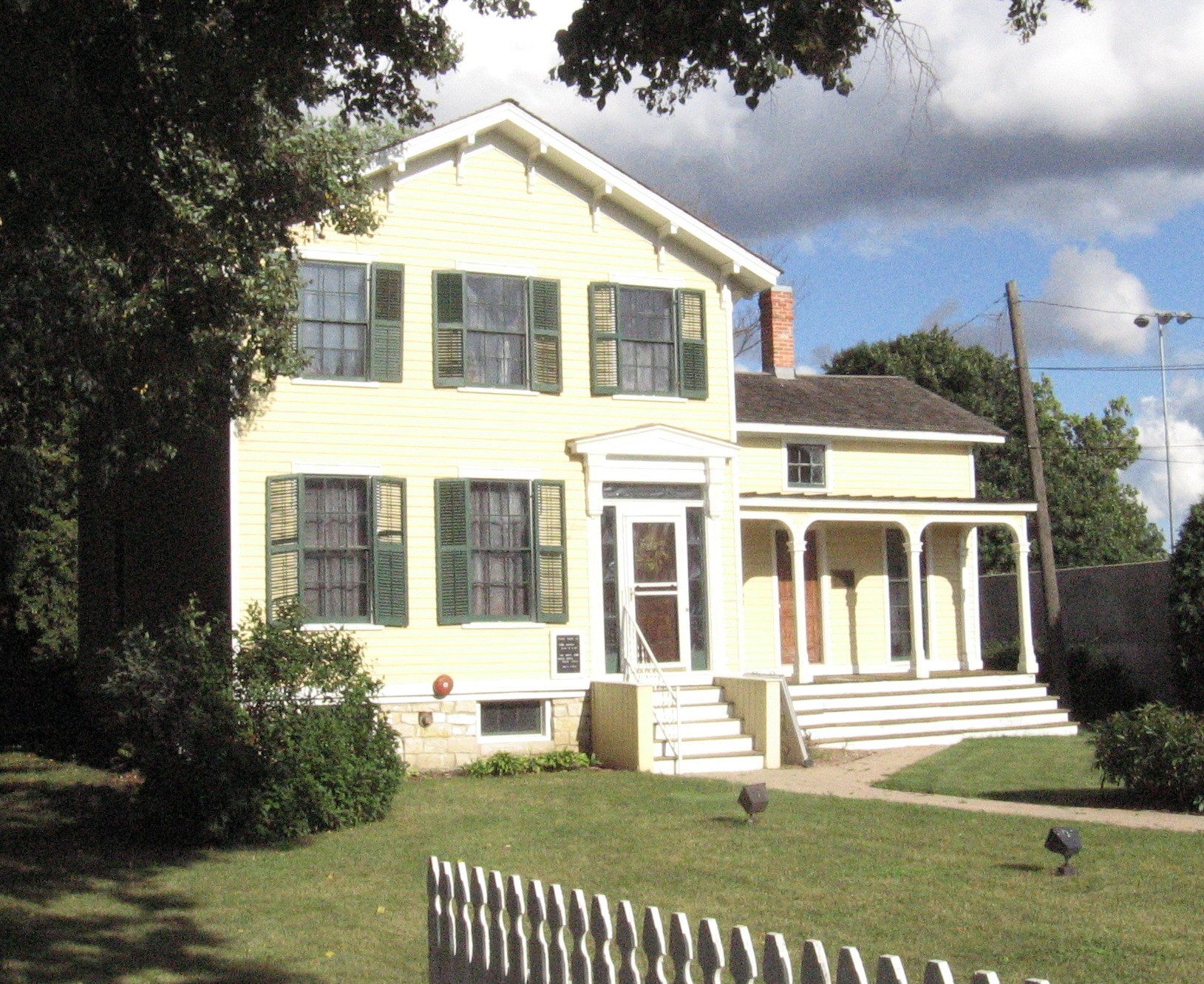

- Location within Illinois Location within the United States
- Interactive map showing Robert Vial House’s location
- Location: 7425 S. Wolf Rd., Burr Ridge, Illinois
- Coordinates: 41°45′17″N 87°53′45″W
- Area: less than one acre
- Built: 1856
- Architectural style: Upright and wing
- NRHP reference No.: 07000853
- Added to NRHP: August 31, 2007

The Robert Vial House is a historic house located at 7425 S. Wolf Rd. in Burr Ridge, Illinois. Built in 1856, the house is the oldest in Burr Ridge and the only example of an early farmhouse in the community. The house was designed in the upright-and-wing form of the Greek Revival style and also features elements of the Italianate and Classical Revival styles. The two-story house has a front gable and a 1 1/2-story side wing. The house's main entrance is bordered by sidelights and a transom and framed by pilasters supporting a plain pediment. The front of the house has five six-over-six wood sash windows with wooden shutters. The wing has a front porch with a sloping overhang supported by columns. The house's main eave features ornamental Italianate brackets.

Robert Vial was the second son of Joseph Vial, an early settler of Lyons Township who was also the area's first postmaster and a founder of Lyonsville Congregational Church. Robert built the house for himself in 1856. He operated one of the largest farms in the area, and his farms had the first silo constructed in Cook County. Vial also served as a school director, township supervisor and treasurer of schools and as deacon of the Lyonsville Congregational Church, as had his father before him. After Robert Vial's death, his children converted his farm to a golf course, and the farmhouse became the course's clubhouse (both are gone now, having been converted into a housing development in what is now Western Springs, Illinois). In 1989, the Flagg Creek Heritage Society moved the house from its original location on Plainfield Road to its current site a few miles to the south on Wolf Road. The society restored the house and later turned it into a local history museum.

The house was added to the National Register of Historic Places on August 31, 2007.
