= Donald L. Totten =

American mechanical engineer and politician (1933–2019)

Donald Totten

Chair of the Cook County Republican Party
- In office 1985 – March 1988
- Preceded by: J. Robert Barr
- Succeeded by: James Dvorak

Member of the Illinois Senate from the 3rd district
- In office 1981–1983
- Preceded by: David J. Regner
- Succeeded by: William Marovitz

Member of the Illinois House of Representatives
- In office 1973–1981

Personal details
- Born: February 19, 1933 Brooklyn, New York, U.S.
- Died: April 2, 2019 (aged 86) Cornelius, North Carolina, U.S.
- Party: Republican
- Education: University of Notre Dame
- Profession: Mechanical Engineer; Politician

Donald Lee Totten (February 19, 1933 – April 2, 2019) was an American mechanical engineer and politician who served in the Illinois House of Representatives from 1973 to 1981 and in the Illinois Senate from 1981 to 1983. He also served as chairman of the Cook County Republican Party.

== Early life and career ==
Totten was born in Brooklyn in New York City. He lived with his family in Ridgewood, New Jersey. Totten attended Ridgewood High School in Ridgewood and Perkiomen School in Pennsburg, Pennsylvania. In 1955, Totten received his bachelor's degree in mechanical engineering from University of Notre Dame. In 1955 he moved to Illinois and worked as an industrial plant engineer.

== Political career ==
He was involved with the Republican Party and with Schaumburg Township Republican Party Committee. Totten served in the Illinois House of Representatives from 1973 to 1981 and in the Illinois Senate from 1981 to 1983. In 1982, Totten ran for the Republican nomination for Lieutenant Governor, finishing third behind Susan Catania and Republican nominee George Ryan.

From 1985 until March 1988, Totten was the chairman of the Cook County Republican Party.

Donald Totten was the Reagan for Illinois state director in Reagan's 1976 challenge to incumbent President Gerald Ford. Totten helped manage the midwestern operations of the presidential campaigns of Ronald Reagan in 1980 and 1984, and served as the Illinois coordinator for the presidential campaign of Jack Kemp in the 1988 Republican primaries. He also served on the Regional Transportation Authority in Illinois.

== Death ==
Totten died from heart failure at his daughter's house in Cornelius, North Carolina.
