= La Grange Village Hall =

- Lyons Township Hall
- U.S. National Register of Historic Places
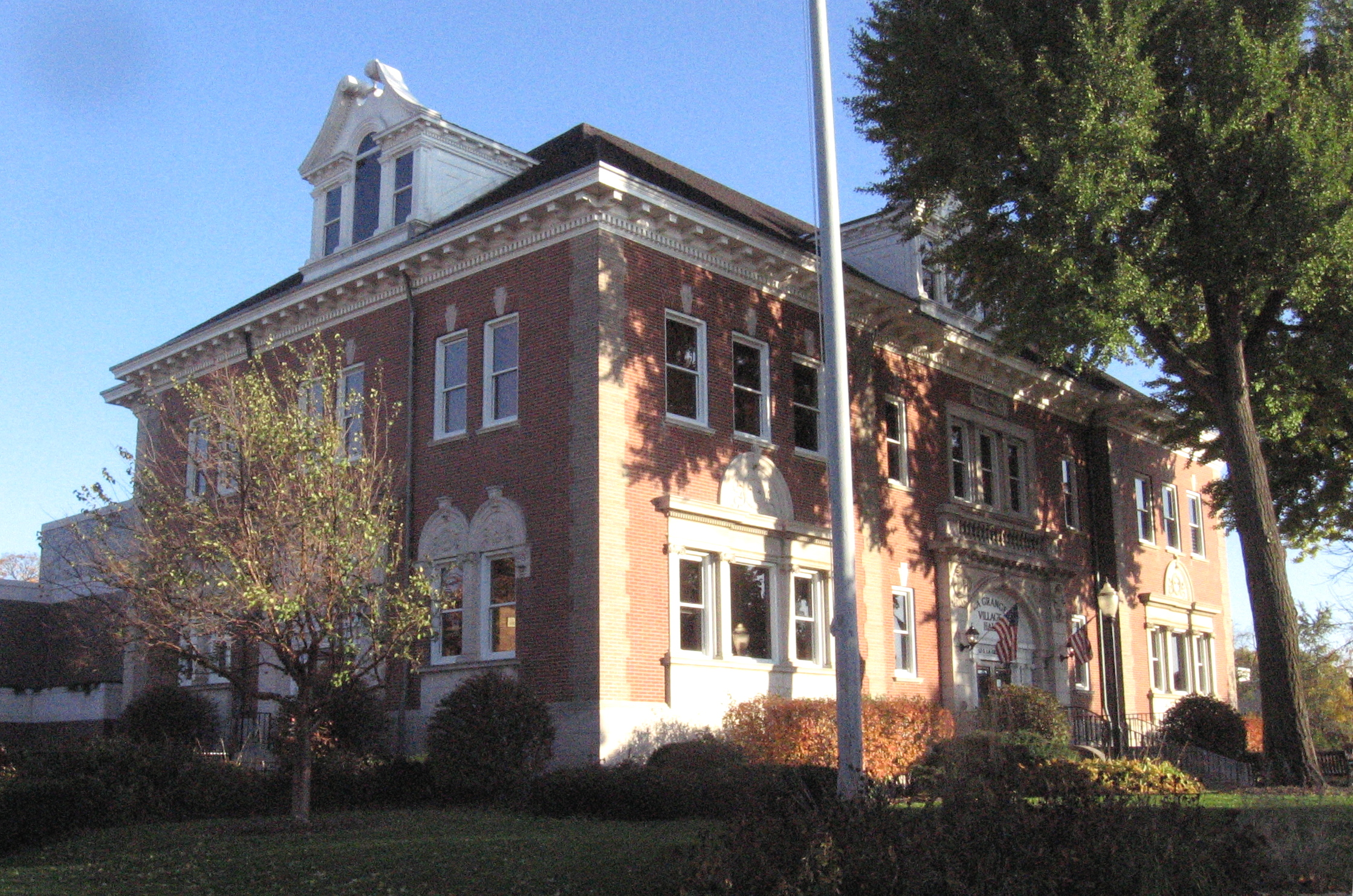

- Location within Chicago metropolitan area Location within Illinois Location within the United States
- Location: 53 S. LaGrange Rd., La Grange, Illinois
- Coordinates: 41°48′50″N 87°52′09″W
- Area: 0.6 acres (0.24 ha)
- Built: 1900
- Architect: Stiles & Stephens
- Architectural style: Georgian Revival
- NRHP reference No.: 78001138
- Added to NRHP: November 30, 1978

The La Grange Village Hall, also known as the Lyons Township Hall, is a historic building at 53 S. LaGrange Road in La Grange, Illinois. Built in 1900, the building houses the offices of the village of La Grange and Lyons Township. It historically also hosted most of La Grange's community events and is home to an American Legion post. The architecture firm Stiles & Stephens of Chicago designed the building in the Georgian Revival style, which was one of the classically inspired styles popular for large public buildings at the time. The building's design includes an arched stone entrance flanked by Ionic columns and topped by a balustrade, brick quoins, a bracketed and dentillated cornice, and pedimented dormers on each side of the roof.

The building was added to the National Register of Historic Places on November 30, 1978.
