= William Bradshaw Egan =

American politician

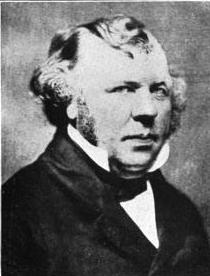

Member of the Illinois House of Representatives from the 54th district
- In office 1852 – 1854

Personal details
- Born: September 28, 1808 Killarney, Ireland
- Died: October 27, 1860 (aged 52) Chicago, Illinois
- Profession: Physician

William Bradshaw Egan (September 28, 1808 – October 27, 1860), sometimes Eagan, was an Irish American medical doctor, politician, and orator. Born in Killarney, Egan trained in the United Kingdom before immigrating to North America to teach school. He later studied in New York City, New York, then ventured west to the burgeoning city of Chicago, Illinois. As one of the first trained physicians in the city, Egan rose to prominence, serving on the first board of health and serving in the Illinois House of Representatives.

== Biography ==
William Bradshaw Egan was born in Killarney, Ireland on September 28, 1808. He was a second cousin of Irish political leader Daniel O'Connell. When he was fifteen, he studied medicine in Lancashire, England before continuing in London and Dublin. He received a degree from Trinity College Dublin, then emigrated to North America. He first settled in Quebec, Canada, teaching a school. He later taught in Montreal, Quebec and New York City, New York, United States. There, he matriculated at the Rutgers Medical School. He then accepted a position at the University of Virginia. In 1830, the New Jersey State Medical Society granted him a license to practice medicine. He then opened a practice in Newark, New Jersey.

In 1833, he decided to move west to the new town of Chicago, Illinois. As one of the few trained medical professionals in the city, he quickly rose to prominence. He represented the South Division of the city on its health committee, making him one of the two members of what was the city's first board of health. Egan became a noted orator and gave the celebratory speech at the opening of the Illinois and Michigan Canal. In 1842, Egan was elected the president of an organization of Irish Americans that sought to liberate their homeland. Aside from medical pursuits, Egan made a fortune in real estate.

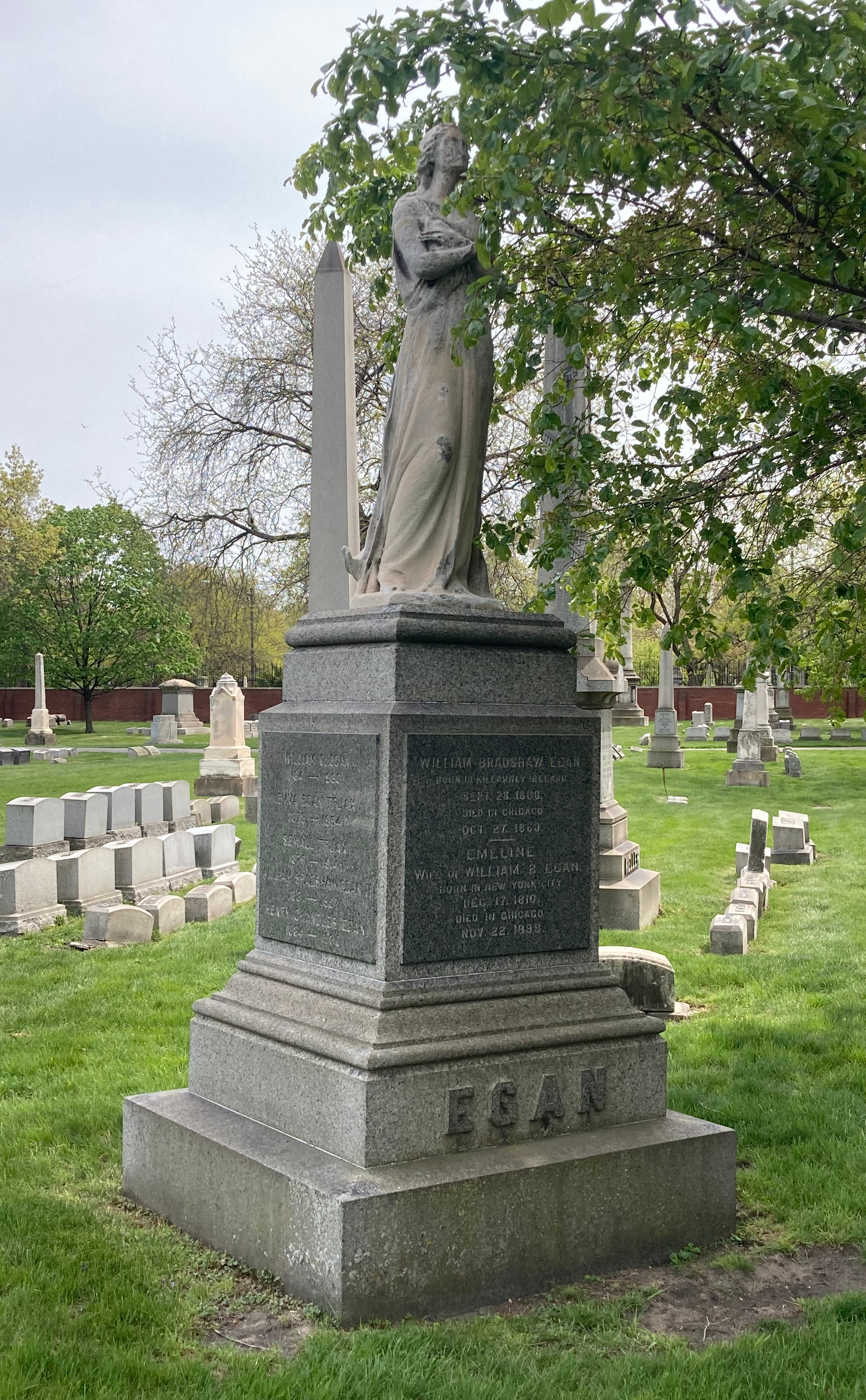
Egan's grave at Graceland Cemetery

Egan was elected city recorder in 1844. In 1852, Eagan was elected to the Illinois House of Representatives, where he served a two-year term. He spoke with James Henry Lane, arguing that Kansas should be admitted as a free state. In 1856, he participated in the formation of the Republican Party by presiding over two of Anson Burlingame's speeches in favor of its establishment.

Egan married Emeline W. Mabbatt in 1832. He was Episcopalian and co-founded the St. James Episcopal Church. He died at his home in Chicago on October 27, 1860, and was buried in Graceland Cemetery. Pershing Road was originally known as Egan Street in his honor.
