= Virginia B. MacDonald =

American politician

Virginia B. MacDonald (née Blue; October 24, 1920 – July 12, 2008) was an American politician.

Born in El Paso, Texas, MacDonald went to the University of New Mexico. MacDonald lived in Arlington Heights, Illinois, and was involved with the Republican Party. She served in the Illinois Constitutional Convention of 1970. MacDonald served in the Illinois House of Representatives from 1973 to 1983. MacDonald then served in the Illinois State Senate from 1983 to 1993. She also served a stint as chair of the Cook County Republican Party.

MacDonald died at her home in Arlington Heights, Illinois.
