= Berwyn Township, Illinois =

Berwyn Township
- Township
- Seal
- Motto: "A Tradition of Service"
- Location in Cook County

- Cook County's location in Illinois
- Coordinates: 41°50′33″N 87°47′28″W
- Country: United States
- State: Illinois
- County: Cook

Area
  - Total: 3.90 sq mi (10.11 km^{2})
  - Land: 3.90 sq mi (10.11 km^{2})
  - Water: 0 sq mi (0 km^{2})
- Elevation: 610 ft (186 m)

Population (2020)
  - Total: 57,250
  - Density: 14,670/sq mi (5,663/km^{2})
- Time zone: UTC-6 (CST)
  - Summer (DST): UTC-5 (CDT)
- ZIP codes: 60402
- FIPS code: 17-05586
- Website: berwyntownship.org

Berwyn Township is one of 29 townships in Cook County, Illinois, USA. As of the 2020 census, its population was 57,250, and it contained 21,037 housing units. It is coterminous with the city of Berwyn.

Berwyn Township, with a population of 56,657 (2010 census) and over 22,000 households includes the area bounded on the north by Roosevelt Road, on the south by Pershing Road (39th Street), on the east by Lombard Avenue (west side of the street only), and on the west by Harlem Avenue (east side of the street only).

Berwyn Township was established by the Illinois Legislature in 1922 as one of the few coterminous townships in the state. The Berwyn Public Health District was established at the same time. The township and the health district are two separate and distinct governmental bodies with separate governing boards; the township and health district moved to their present headquarters at 6600 W. 26th Street in 1939. Built for $50,000, construction of the building was made possible by federal grants under the Works Progress Administration (WPA).

== Geography ==
According to the United States Census Bureau, Berwyn Township covers an area of 3.9 square miles (10.1 km^{2}), all of it land.

=== Adjacent townships ===
- Cicero Township (east)
- Oak Park Township (north)
- Riverside Township (southwest)
- Lyons Township (southwest)
- Proviso Township (northwest)
- Stickney Township (south)

== Demographics ==
As of the 2020 census there were 57,250 people, 18,277 households, and 12,348 families residing in the township. The population density was 14,664.45 inhabitants per square mile (5,661.98/km^{2}). There were 21,037 housing units at an average density of 5,388.58 units per square mile (2,080.54 units/km^{2}). The racial makeup of the township was 33.33% White, 8.53% African American, 2.79% Native American, 2.52% Asian, 0.03% Pacific Islander, 31.61% from other races, and 21.19% from two or more races. Hispanic or Latino of any race were 64.15% of the population.

There were 18,277 households, out of which 39.20% had children under the age of 18 living with them, 44.98% were married couples living together, 16.13% had a female householder with no spouse present, and 32.44% were non-families. 25.90% of all households were made up of individuals, and 9.20% had someone living alone who was 65 years of age or older. The average household size was 2.99 and the average family size was 3.67.

The township's age distribution consisted of 26.1% under the age of 18, 8.7% from 18 to 24, 28.8% from 25 to 44, 23.9% from 45 to 64, and 12.5% who were 65 years of age or older. The median age was 35.6 years. For every 100 females, there were 101.6 males. For every 100 females age 18 and over, there were 99.3 males.

The median income for a household in the township was $61,915, and the median income for a family was $72,241. Males had a median income of $37,584 versus $32,273 for females. The per capita income for the township was $25,939. About 9.0% of families and 12.5% of the population were below the poverty line, including 17.7% of those under age 18 and 10.8% of those age 65 or over.

Historical population
Census	Pop.	Note	%±
2010	56,657		—
2020	57,250		1.0%
U.S. Decennial Census
