= Burbank School District 111 =

School district in Illinois, United States

Address
- 7600 South Central Avenue Burbank, Illinois, 60459; United States

District information
- Type: Public
- Grades: PreK–8
- NCES District ID: 1736810

Students and staff
- Students: 3,343

Other information
- Website: www.bsd111.org

Burbank School District 111 is an elementary school district located in Burbank, Illinois, a southwest Chicago suburb just south of Chicago Midway International Airport in Stickney Township, Cook County. The district, which was established in 1923 though its official logo claims that it was established in 1875, – nearly a half century before the city incorporated in 1970 – includes six elementary schools, one Early Learning Centre, and one junior high school, all of which are located within the city of Burbank; all of the elementary schools enroll students from Pre-K through Eighth Grade. The district superintendent is Dr. Franzy Fleck as of 2025.

== Schools ==
=== Elementary schools ===
The elementary schools are:

- Luther Burbank School (1943), the city being indirectly named after this school, under principal Robert Mocek, which was reopened in 2018 after being rebuilt
- Richard E. Byrd School (1958), principal Marian Stockhausen
- Harry E. Fry School (1956), principal Mary Rein, which closed after the 2003–2004 school year and reopened during the 2009–2010 school year.
- Jacqueline Kennedy School (1964), principal J.R. Entsminger
- Rosa G. Maddock School (1954), principal Dr. Walker-Hood, has been principal for several other BSD 111 schools:
- Frances B. McCord Learning Center, principle Ashley Hines
- Edward J. Tobin School (1938), principal Mary Anne Sheehan, which was reopened in 2007 after being rebuilt

Students from all these elementary schools move on to Liberty Junior High School, which is under the direction of principal Shwkar Abousweilem. Prior to Liberty's opening in 2004, most of the elementary schools enrolled students through eighth grade. In 2021 Liberty added a west wing to the building adding sixth grade to the school. Following junior high school, students advance to Reavis High School or any other school if their choice.

=== Middle schools ===
- Liberty Junior High School

=== Former schools ===
Former schools in the district included:

- John Foster Dulles School (1960-2004), which was demolished and rebuilt and remodeled to make way for Liberty Junior High School. Yet again in 2021 they added the west wing.
- Nottingham Park School (1950-?), in the adjacent unincorporated community of the same name
- Marjorie Owens School (1956-1980), which was converted into a police station and courthouse, and later into the township's senior citizens' center

== Website ==
https://www.bsd111.org
