= Lyons Township, Illinois =

Lyons Township
- Township
- Seal

- Location in Cook County

- Cook County's location in Illinois
- Coordinates: 41°46′29″N 87°51′35″W
- Country: United States
- State: Illinois
- County: Cook

Government
  - Supervisor: Christopher Getty

Area
  - Total: 36.92 sq mi (95.6 km^{2})
  - Land: 36.36 sq mi (94.2 km^{2})
  - Water: 0.56 sq mi (1.5 km^{2}) 1.53%
- Elevation: 620 ft (189 m)

Population (2020)
  - Total: 115,105
  - Density: 3,166/sq mi (1,222/km^{2})
- Time zone: UTC-6 (CST)
  - Summer (DST): UTC-5 (CDT)
- ZIP codes: 60455, 60457, 60458, 60480 60501, 60513, 60521, 60525, 60534, 60546, 60558
- FIPS code: 17-031-45447
- Website: www.lyonstownshipil.gov

Lyons Township is one of 29 townships in Cook County, Illinois. As of the 2020 census, its population was 115,105, with its most populous municipalities including La Grange (pop. 15,550), Justice (pop. 12,926) and Summit (pop. 11,054). Lyons Township was established in 1850. The village of Lyons, almost all of which lies within the township, is often confused with it.

The township hall is located at 6404 S. Joliet Road in Countryside. Other township municipalities include Indian Head Park, Hodgkins and McCook, as well as major portions of Western Springs, Brookfield, Bridgeview, Burr Ridge and Willow Springs. Lyons Township's approximate borders are Harlem Avenue (Illinois Route 43) on the east, the line of 39th Street (Pershing Road) on the north, the DuPage County boundary (County Line Road) on the west, and the line of 87th Street on the south, except west of Willow Springs, where it follows the Des Plaines River to the DuPage county line. The Chicago Sanitary and Ship Canal, designated a National Historic District in 2011, passes through the township from southwest to northeast.

== Geography ==
According to the 2021 census gazetteer files, Lyons Township has a total area of 36.92 square miles (95.62 km^{2}), of which 36.36 square miles (94.17 km^{2}) (or 98.47%) is land and 0.56 square miles (1.45 km^{2}) (or 1.53%) is water.

=== Borders ===
Lyons Township is bordered on the north by Proviso and Riverside Townships, on the east by Stickney Township and the Chicago communities of Garfield Ridge and Clearing, on the south by Palos Township, and on the west by Downers Grove Township in DuPage County.

=== Cities, towns, villages ===
There are seventeen municipalities completely or partially within Lyons Township's thirty-seven square miles of territory:

- Bedford Park (the half west of Harlem Avenue)
- Bridgeview (the half northwest of 87th Street and Harlem)
- Brookfield (the third south of Southview Avenue)
- Burr Ridge (the eastern half in Cook County)
- Countryside
- Hickory Hills (the small portion north of 87th Street)
- Hinsdale (the small portion in Cook County)
- Hodgkins
- Indian Head Park
- Justice
- La Grange
- Lyons (all but the small portion north of 39th Street)
- McCook
- Riverside (the small portion south of 39th Street)
- Summit
- Western Springs (all but the small portion north of 39th Street)
- Willow Springs (all but the area south of 87th Street and the Des Plaines River)

=== Unincorporated Towns ===
- Gary at 41.770588°N 87.855614°W
- Hollywood (mostly in Riverside Township)
- La Grange Highlands at 41.7833546°N 87.9017402°W

=== Extinct Towns ===
- Tiedtville at 41.724079°N 87.904847°W

=== Adjacent townships ===
- Proviso Township (north)
- Riverside Township (north northeast)
- Berwyn Township (northeast)
- Stickney Township (east northeast and east southeast)
- Worth Township (southeast)
- Palos Township (south)
- Lemont Township (southwest)
- Downers Grove Township, DuPage County (west)
- York Township, DuPage County (northwest)

=== Cemeteries ===
The township contains these seven cemeteries: Archer Woods Memorial Park, Bethania, LaGrange, Lithuanian National, Resurrection, Saint Johns and Lyonsville.

=== Major highways ===
- Interstate 55
- Interstate 294
- U.S. Route 12
- U.S. Route 20
- U.S. Route 34
- U.S. Route 45
- U.S. Route 66
- Illinois Route 43
- Illinois Route 171

=== Airports and landing strips ===
- La Grange Memorial Hospital Heliport
- Pielet Summit Heliport

=== Rivers ===
- Des Plaines River

=== Lakes ===
- Lake Carriage Way
- Lake Ida
- Sunset Lake

=== Landmarks ===
- Arie Crown Forest Preserve
- Buffalo Woods (Cook County Forest Preserves)
- Columbia Woods (Cook County Forest Preserves)
- Chicago Portage National Historic Site
- Emmanuel Episcopal Church
- First Congregational Church of Western Springs
- George E. Purple House
- Hofmann Tower
- La Grange Village Historic District
- Lyons Township Hall
- Robert Vial House
- Western Springs Water Tower

== Demographics ==
Historical population
| Census | Pop. | Note | %± |
|---|---|---|---|
| 1930 | 32,549 | | — |
| 1940 | 36,673 | | 12.7% |
| 1950 | 51,946 | | 41.6% |
| 1960 | 82,214 | | 58.3% |
| 1970 | 100,898 | | 22.7% |
| 1980 | 105,317 | | 4.4% |
| 1990 | 104,981 | | −0.3% |
| 2000 | 109,264 | | 4.1% |
| 2010 | 111,688 | | 2.2% |
| 2020 | 115,105 | | 3.1% |
U.S. Decennial Census

As of the 2020 census there were 115,105 people, 40,149 households, and 28,034 families residing in the township. The population density was 3,117.69 inhabitants per square mile (1,203.75/km^{2}). There were 44,877 housing units at an average density of 1,215.52 per square mile (469.31/km^{2}). The racial makeup of the township was 68.77% White, 5.60% African American, 0.81% Native American, 2.71% Asian, 0.02% Pacific Islander, 10.41% from other races, and 11.68% from two or more races. Hispanic or Latino of any race were 24.66% of the population.

There were 40,149 households, out of which 34.20% had children under the age of 18 living with them, 53.67% were married couples living together, 11.49% had a female householder with no spouse present, and 30.18% were non-families. 27.00% of all households were made up of individuals, and 11.40% had someone living alone who was 65 years of age or older. The average household size was 2.73 and the average family size was 3.35.

The township's age distribution consisted of 25.6% under the age of 18, 7.2% from 18 to 24, 24.1% from 25 to 44, 26.8% from 45 to 64, and 16.3% who were 65 years of age or older. The median age was 39.6 years. For every 100 females, there were 95.1 males. For every 100 females age 18 and over, there were 93.0 males.

The median income for a household in the township was $79,665, and the median income for a family was $101,966. Males had a median income of $53,057 versus $37,318 for females. The per capita income for the township was $45,847. About 7.0% of families and 9.5% of the population were below the poverty line, including 13.2% of those under age 18 and 7.4% of those age 65 or over.

== Elected officials ==
- Christopher Getty - Supervisor
- Elyse Hoffenberg - Clerk
- Patrick Hynes - Assessor
- Sean McDermott - Highway Commissioner
- Colleen H. Kelly - Trustee
- Donna McDonald - Trustee
- Mark Anderson - Trustee

== Education ==
Lyons Township is served by many public high school districts, the largest bring Lyons Township HS: Lyons Township High School District 204, for students in the northwest half of the township, and Argo Community High School District 217, for students in the southeast half. Students in Lyons attend J. Sterling Morton High School West in Berwyn, IL. Some students in Willow Springs attend Amos Alonzo Stagg High School in Palos Hills, IL.

== See also ==
- Resurrection Mary
