= Forest View, Illinois =

- Village
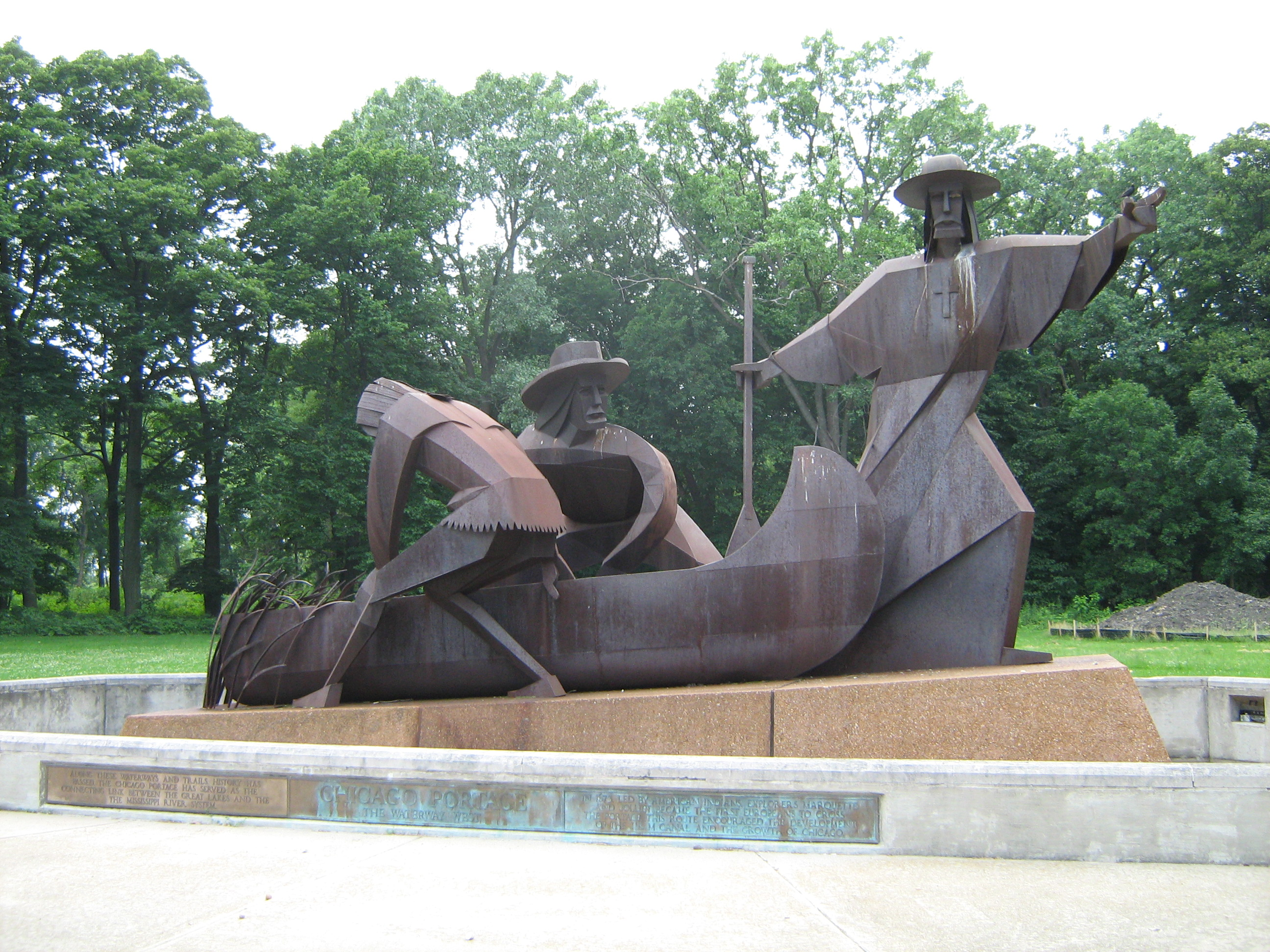
- Chicago Portage National Historic Site
- Nickname: The Cinderella Village
- Location of Forest View in Cook County, Illinois.

- Location within Greater Chicago Location within Illinois Location within the United States
- Coordinates: 41°48′27″N 87°47′10″W
- Country: United States
- State: Illinois
- County: Cook
- Township: Stickney
- Incorporated: 1924
- Founder: World War 1 Veterans

Government
  - Type: Trustee-village
  - President: David Liska

Area
  - Total: 1.30 sq mi (3.36 km^{2})
  - Land: 1.17 sq mi (3.03 km^{2})
  - Water: 0.13 sq mi (0.33 km^{2}) 10.83%

Population (2020)
  - Total: 792
  - Density: 677.9/sq mi (261.73/km^{2})
- Down 10.28% from 2000

Standard of living (2007-11)
  - Per capita income: $26,547
  - Median home value: $234,900
- ZIP code(s): 60402
- Area code(s): 708
- Geocode: 26987
- FIPS code: 17-26987
- Website: https://www.forestview-il.org

Forest View is a village in Cook County, Illinois, United States. Per the 2020 census, the population was 792. It is primarily an industrial corridor adjacent to the Chicago neighborhood of Garfield Ridge, which is on the village's southern border.

== Geography ==
Forest View is located at 41°48′27″N 87°47′10″W (41.807379, -87.786065).

According to the 2021 census gazetteer files, Forest View has a total area of 1.30 square miles (3.37 km^{2}), of which 1.17 square miles (3.03 km^{2}) (or 90.19%) is land and 0.13 square miles (0.34 km^{2}) (or 9.81%) is water.

== Demographics ==
Historical population
Census	Pop.	Note	%±
1930	125		—
1940	208		66.4%
1950	291		39.9%
1960	1,042		258.1%
1970	927		−11.0%
1980	764		−17.6%
1990	743		−2.7%
2000	778		4.7%
2010	698		−10.3%
2020	792		13.5%
U.S. Decennial Census; 2010 2020

As of the 2020 census there were 792 people, 361 households, and 301 families residing in the village. The population density was 611.58 inhabitants per square mile (236.13/km^{2}). There were 288 housing units at an average density of 222.39 per square mile (85.87/km^{2}). The racial makeup of the village was 54.17% White, 2.02% African American, 4.42% Native American, 1.52% Asian, 0.00% Pacific Islander, 20.33% from other races, and 17.55% from two or more races. Hispanic or Latino of any race were 48.86% of the population.

There were 361 households, out of which 33.1% had children under the age of 18 living with them, 66.20% were married couples living together, 9.42% had a female householder with no husband present, and 16.62% were non-families. 14.40% of all households were made up of individuals, and 6.65% had someone living alone who was 65 years of age or older. The average household size was 4.07 and the average family size was 3.63.

The village's age distribution consisted of 31.8% under the age of 18, 4.7% from 18 to 24, 23.8% from 25 to 44, 24.7% from 45 to 64, and 15.0% who were 65 years of age or older. The median age was 37.1 years. For every 100 females, there were 105.3 males. For every 100 females age 18 and over, there were 96.7 males.

The median income for a household in the village was $97,321, and the median income for a family was $110,347. Males had a median income of $50,379 versus $46,000 for females. The per capita income for the village was $33,010. About 1.3% of families and 1.8% of the population were below the poverty line, including 0.0% of those under age 18 and 1.5% of those age 65 or over.

Forest View village, Illinois – Racial and ethnic composition Note: the US Census treats Hispanic/Latino as an ethnic category. This table excludes Latinos from the racial categories and assigns them to a separate category. Hispanics/Latinos may be of any race.
Race / Ethnicity (NH = Non-Hispanic)	Pop 2000	Pop 2010	Pop 2020	% 2000	% 2010	% 2020
White alone (NH)	685	467	359	88.05%	66.91%	45.33%
Black or African American alone (NH)	3	5	16	0.39%	0.72%	2.02%
Native American or Alaska Native alone (NH)	0	0	0	0.00%	0.00%	0.00%
Asian alone (NH)	0	13	12	0.00%	1.86%	1.52%
Pacific Islander alone (NH)	0	2	0	0.00%	0.29%	0.00%
Other race alone (NH)	0	5	0	0.00%	0.72%	0.00%
Mixed race or Multiracial (NH)	9	3	18	1.16%	0.43%	2.27%
Hispanic or Latino (any race)	81	203	387	10.41%	29.08%	48.86%
Total	778	698	792	100.00%	100.00%	100.00%

== Government ==
Forest View is in Illinois' 3rd congressional district.

== Education ==
Forest View is served by Lyons School District 103. Grade school students attend Home Elementary School in neighboring Stickney, and George Washington Middle School in Lyons.

It is served by J. Sterling Morton High School District 201's Morton West located in Berwyn as its residential areas are west of Ridgeland Avenue.

== Transportation ==
Pace provides bus service on routes 307 and 311 connecting Forest View to destinations across the region.
