= Lyons School District 103 =

School district in Illinois, United States

Address
- 4100 Joliet Avenue Lyons, Illinois, 60534; United States

District information
- Type: Public
- Grades: PreK–8
- NCES District ID: 1723850

Students and staff
- Students: 2,258

Other information
- Website: www.sd103.com

Lyons School District 103 (SD103) is a school district headquartered in Lyons, Illinois.

== Schools ==
Middle school:

- George Washington Middle School (Lyons)

Elementary schools:

- Costello Elementary School (Lyons)
- Edison Elementary School (Stickney)
- Home Elementary School (Stickney)
- Lincoln Elementary School (Brookfield)
- Robinson Elementary School (Lyons)
  - Named for James W. Robinson, Jr., Medal of Honor Recipient.
