= Cicero Township, Illinois =

Cicero Township
- Township
- Location in Cook County

- Cook County's location in Illinois
- Coordinates: 41°50′40″N 87°45′35″W
- Country: United States
- State: Illinois
- County: Cook

Area
  - Total: 5.87 sq mi (15.2 km^{2})
  - Land: 5.87 sq mi (15.2 km^{2})
  - Water: 0 sq mi (0 km^{2}) 0%
- Elevation: 607 ft (185 m)

Population (2020)
  - Total: 85,268
  - Density: 14,500/sq mi (5,610/km^{2})
- Time zone: UTC-6 (CST)
  - Summer (DST): UTC-5 (CDT)
- FIPS code: 17-031-14364

Cicero Township is one of 29 townships in Cook County, Illinois, United States. It is coextensive with the town of Cicero. As of the 2020 census, its population was 85,268.

== Geography ==
According to the 2021 census gazetteer files, Cicero Township has a total area of 5.87 square miles (15.20 km^{2}), all land.

=== Major highways ===
- Illinois Route 50 - Cicero Avenue
- U.S. Route 34 - Ogden Avenue

=== Adjacent townships ===
- Berwyn Township (west)
- Oak Park Township (northwest)
- Stickney Township (south)

== Demographics ==
As of the 2020 census there were 85,268 people, 22,698 households, and 17,508 families residing in the township. The population density was 14,538.45 inhabitants per square mile (5,613.33/km^{2}). There were 25,836 housing units at an average density of 4,405.12 units per square mile (1,700.83 units/km^{2}). The racial makeup of the township was 19.22% White, 3.72% African American, 4.26% Native American, 0.59% Asian, 0.04% Pacific Islander, 46.86% from other races, and 25.30% from two or more races. Hispanic or Latino of any race were 89.00% of the population.

There were 22,698 households, out of which 45.50% had children under the age of 18 living with them, 47.83% were married couples living together, 19.60% had a female householder with no spouse present, and 22.87% were non-families. 19.00% of all households were made up of individuals, and 5.60% had someone living alone who was 65 years of age or older. The average household size was 3.55 and the average family size was 4.06.

The township's age distribution consisted of 28.0% under the age of 18, 12.3% from 18 to 24, 28.2% from 25 to 44, 23.2% from 45 to 64, and 8.5% who were 65 years of age or older. The median age was 31.7 years. For every 100 females, there were 96.9 males. For every 100 females age 18 and over, there were 98.9 males.

The median income for a household in the township was $53,726, and the median income for a family was $56,632. Males had a median income of $33,835 versus $26,101 for females. The per capita income for the township was $20,040. About 11.4% of families and 13.8% of the population were below the poverty line, including 18.3% of those under age 18 and 15.3% of those age 65 or over.

Historical population
Census	Pop.	Note	%±
2000	85,616		—
2010	83,891		−2.0%
2020	85,268		1.6%
U.S. Decennial Census

== Political districts ==
- State House District 21
- State House District 23
- State House District 24
- State Senate District 11
- State Senate District 12
