= Harlem Avenue =

Street in Chicago, Illinois, US

- 7200 West
- Part of: IL 43 from the Frankfort Square–Matteson–Frankfort tripoint to Niles; Historic Route 66 from Joliet Road at the Lyons–Stickney to Ogden Avenue at the Lyons–Riverside–Berwyn tripoint
- Length: 51.7 mi (83.2 km)
- Location: Will and Cook counties, Illinois, United States
- South end: IL 50 in Peotone
- Major junctions: IL 50 Peotone; US 30 at the Frankfort Square–Matteson–Frankfort tripoint; I-80 in Tinley Park; US 6 at the Tinley Park–Orland Park line; US 12 / US 20 at the Oak Lawn–Bridgeview line; I-55 at the Summit–Forest View line; US 34 at the Lyons–Riverside–Berwyn tripoint; I-290 / IL 110 (CKC) at the Forest Park–Oak Park line; I-90 in Norwood Park; US 14 at the Morton Grove–Niles line
- North end: Glenview Road in Glenview

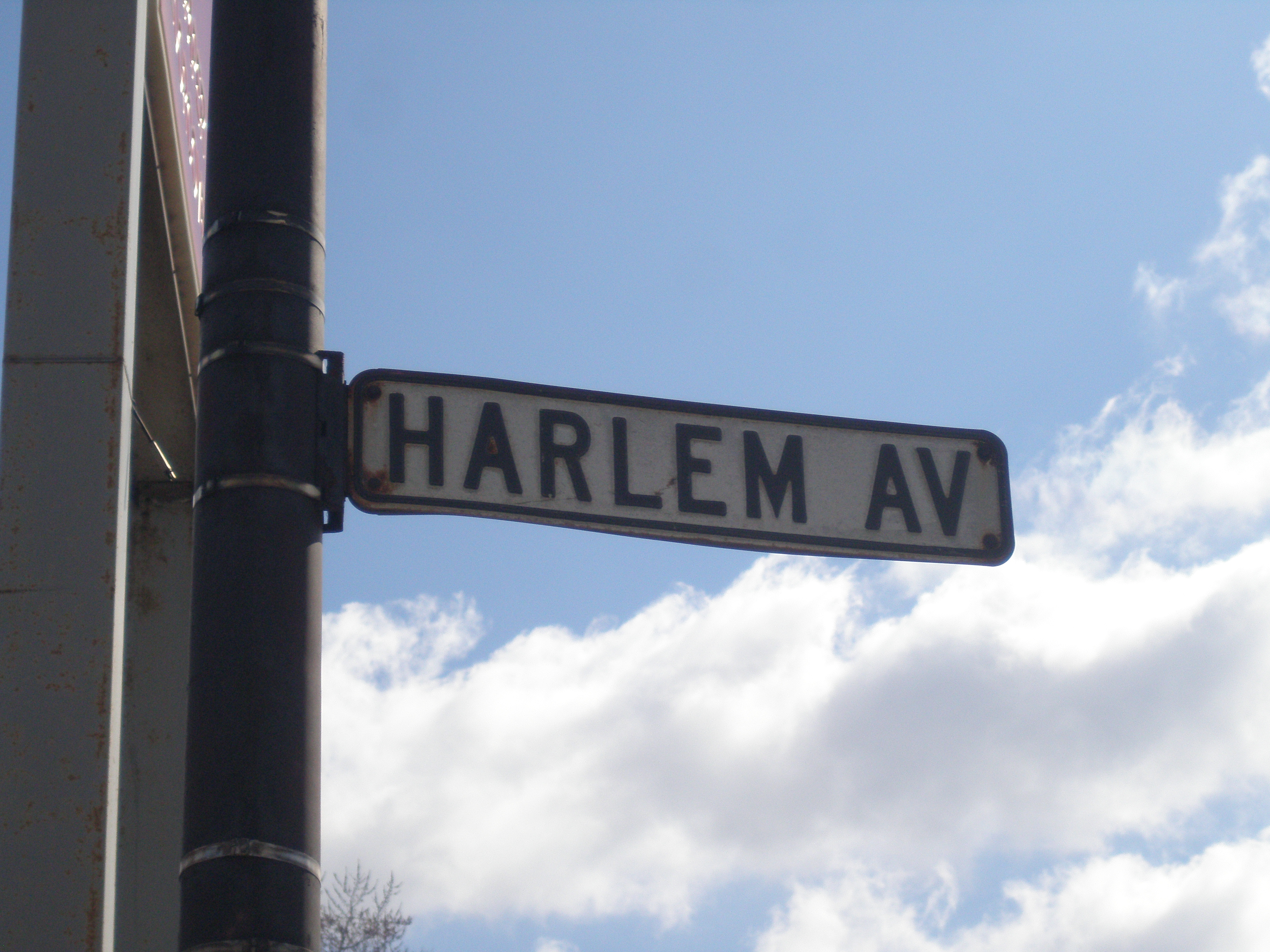
A street sign

Harlem Avenue is a major north–south street located in Chicago and its west, southwest, and northwest suburbs. It stretches from Glenview Road in Glenview to the intersection of East South Street and South Drecksler Road in Peotone, where it diverges into Illinois Route 50. At 54.1 miles (87.1 km), it is the third-longest street in the United States, after Telegraph Road in southeastern Michigan and O Street in Nebraska. For most of its length, it carries Illinois Route 43.

An express bus service from Pace Pulse is currently being planned for the portion of the street between 95th Street and North Avenue, serving primarily the southern and western suburbs.

== Communities served ==
From north to south:

- Glenview (suburb)
- Morton Grove (suburb)
- Niles (suburb)
- Park Ridge (suburb)
- Edison Park (Chicago neighborhood)
- Norwood Park (Chicago neighborhood)
- Harwood Heights (suburb)
- Norridge (suburb)
- Dunning (Chicago neighborhood)
- Montclare (Chicago neighborhood)
- Elmwood Park (suburb)
- Austin (Chicago neighborhood)
- River Forest (suburb)
- Oak Park (suburb)
- Forest Park (suburb)
- Berwyn (suburb)
- North Riverside (suburb)
- Riverside (suburb)
- Lyons (suburb)
- Stickney (suburb)
- Forest View (suburb)
- Garfield Ridge (Chicago neighborhood)
- Clearing (Chicago neighborhood)
- Summit (suburb)
- Bedford Park (suburb)
- Bridgeview (suburb)
- Burbank (suburb)
- Oak Lawn (suburb)
- Chicago Ridge (suburb)
- Worth (suburb)
- Palos Heights (suburb)
- Orland Park (suburb)
- Tinley Park (suburb)
- Matteson (suburb)
- Frankfort (suburb)
- Monee (suburb)

== Major intersections ==
County	Location	mi	km	Destinations	Notes
Will	Peotone	0.0	0.0	IL 50 south / Drecksler Road / South Street	
Will	Peotone	0.9	1.4	IL 50 north (Governors Highway)	Northern end of IL 50 concurrency
Will–Cook county line	Frankfort Square–Matteson– Frankfort tripoint	12.4	20.0	US 30 / Lincoln Highway IL 43 begins	Southern end of IL 43 overlap; southern terminus of IL 43
Will–Cook county line	Tinley Park	15.5	24.9	I-80 – Joliet, Gary	Exit 148 on I-80
Cook	Tinley Park–Orland Park line	19.0	30.6	US 6 (159th Street)	
Cook	Palos Heights	24.1	38.8	IL 83 (College Drive)	
Cook	Worth	25.7	41.4	IL 7 south (Southwest Highway)	Northern terminus of IL 7
Cook	Oak Lawn–Bridgeview line	27.1	43.6	US 12 / US 20 (95th Street) to I-294 Toll (Tri-State Tollway)	Interchange
Cook	Summit–Forest View line	32.8	52.8	I-55 (Stevenson Expressway)	Exit 283 on I-55
Cook	Lyons–Stickney line	34.1	54.9	Historic US 66 west (Joliet Road)	Southern end of Historic US 66 overlap
Cook	Lyons–Riverside– Berwyn tripoint	34.5	55.5	US 34 west / Historic US 66 east (Ogden Avenue)	Northern end of Historic US overlap; eastern terminus of US 34
Cook	Forest Park–Oak Park line	37.9	61.0	I-290 / IL 110 (CKC) (Eisenhower Expressway)	Exit 21B on I-290
Cook	Oak Park–River Forest– Elmwood Park–Chicago quadripoint	40.4	65.0	IL 64 (West North Avenue)	
Cook	Chicago–Norridge line	43.4	69.8	IL 19 (West Irving Park Road)	
Cook	Chicago	45.3	72.9	IL 72 west (West Higgins Avenue)	Eastern terminus of IL 72
Cook	Chicago	45.4	73.1	I-90 (Kennedy Expressway)	Exit 81A on I-90
Cook	Niles	47.9	77.1	IL 21 north (Milwaukee Avenue)	
Cook	Niles	48.5	78.1	IL 43 north (Oakton Street)	Northern end of IL 43 overlap
Cook	Morton Grove–Niles line	49.5	79.7	US 14 (Dempster Street)	
Cook	Glenview–Morton Grove line	50.5	81.3	IL 58 (Golf Road)	
Cook	Glenview	51.7	83.2	Glenview Road	Northern terminus
1.000 mi = 1.609 km; 1.000 km = 0.621 mi: Concurrency terminus

== Major transit connections ==
As one of the most important thoroughfares in Chicagoland outside of Downtown Chicago, Harlem Avenue offers a number of transit connections to the Chicago Loop and points west. Two of Amtrak's secondary Chicagoland stations are also located along Harlem Avenue, serving the two most popular Midwest passenger services (Hiawatha between Chicago and Milwaukee, and the Lincoln Service between Chicago and St. Louis) as well as three long-distance routes. Listed from south to north:

- Metra SouthWest Service - Worth station
- Pace - Pace Pulse 95th Street line (upcoming)
- Pace - Pace Pulse Harlem line (upcoming)
- Summit station (5 blocks west)
  - Metra Heritage Corridor
  - Amtrak Lincoln Service (Chicago-St. Louis)
- Metra BNSF Line - Harlem Avenue station (Berwyn)
- Pace - Pace Pulse Cermak Road line (upcoming)
- Chicago Transit Authority (CTA) - Blue Line - Harlem station (south) (Forest Park)
- CTA - Green Line - Harlem/Lake station and transfer hub (Forest Park & Oak Park)
- Metra - Union Pacific West Line - Oak Park station (adjacent to CTA Green Line Harlem/Lake station)
- Metra - Milwaukee District West Line - Mont Clare station (Montclare community area, Chicago, 2 blocks east)
- CTA - Blue Line - Harlem station (north) (Norwood Park community area, Chicago)
- Pace - Pace Pulse Touhy Avenue line (upcoming)
- Pace - Pace Pulse Milwaukee Avenue line
- Glenview station
  - Metra Milwaukee District North Line
  - Amtrak Hiawatha service (Chicago-Milwaukee)
  - Amtrak Borealis service (Chicago-Saint Paul via Milwaukee)
  - Amtrak Empire Builder (Chicago-Seattle/Portland via Milwaukee and Saint Paul)
