= Burbank, Illinois =

- City
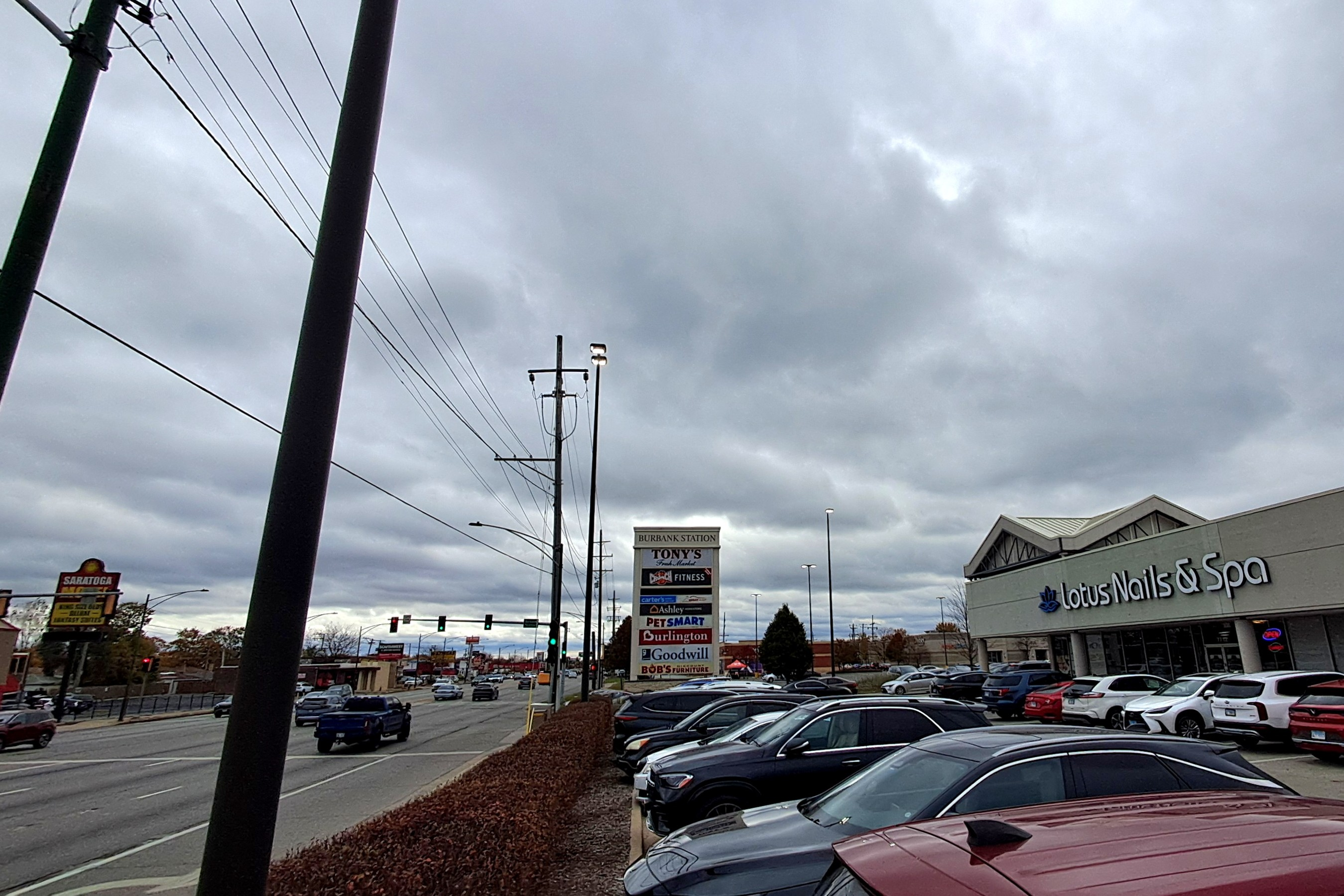
- Burbank Station in November 2025

- Flag Seal

- Location of Burbank in Cook County, Illinois.

- Location within Greater Chicago Location within Illinois Location within the United States
- Coordinates: 41°44′39″N 87°46′13″W
- Country: United States
- State: Illinois
- County: Cook
- Township: Stickney
- Incorporated: 1970

Government
  - Type: Mayor–council
  - Mayor: David Gilgenberg

Area
  - Total: 4.17 sq mi (10.80 km^{2})
  - Land: 4.17 sq mi (10.80 km^{2})
  - Water: 0 sq mi (0.00 km^{2})
- Elevation: 620 ft (190 m)

Population (2020)
  - Total: 29,439
  - Density: 7,060.1/sq mi (2,725.91/km^{2})
- Time zone: UTC-6 (CST)
  - Summer (DST): UTC-5 (CDT)
- ZIP code: 60459
- Area code: 708
- FIPS code: 17-09642
- FIPS code: 17-09642
- GNIS feature ID: 422262, 2393465
- Website: burbankil.gov

Burbank is a city in Cook County, Illinois, United States. The population was 29,439 at the 2020 census. It borders the southwest edge of the city of Chicago; the Chicago city limit – specifically that of the Ashburn neighborhood – is in common with Burbank's eastern city limit. Burbank shares a boundary with Oak Lawn to its south, Bridgeview to its west, and Bedford Park to its north; the city of Hometown is also adjacent to Burbank's southeast corner. Burbank is less than two miles south of Chicago Midway International Airport.

== History ==
In 1850, the area which would become the city of Burbank, then largely uninhabited and agrarian, became part of Lyons Township. Over the next hundred years the area remained largely undeveloped, though several times large plans were laid out for the area, never to come to fruition. In the late 19th century, a railroad investor named A. B. Stickney planned a large railroad transfer center which included what became the northern part of Burbank, but his ideas were never realized due to an economic depression in 1893.

In the 1920s, the area became an attractive site for real-estate developers who bought up farmland and built subdivisions. However, ongoing drainage problems, practically nonexistent water and sewage systems and the Great Depression kept Burbank largely unbuilt and empty until the 1950s.

In 1952, the area became part of Stickney Township, and was generally known as South Stickney. Though still unincorporated, this led to massive development in the area, aided by Chicago residents leaving the city as the city's industry declined, and by 1960 the population of the area had reached 20,720, nearly triple the population of a decade earlier; the 1965 opening of Ford City Mall across Cicero Avenue on the east furthered the area's development. The Melvina Ditch Reservoir, part of the Metropolitan Water Reclamation District of Greater Chicago, was constructed in 1965 along the area's southern border, aiding development by reducing flooding in the region; a reservoir expansion was begun in 2018. The Prairie Trails Library District was established in 1969; initially located in a storefront on 79th Street near Central Avenue, a new library building along State Road was completed in 1978.

The area was incorporated into a city in April 1970, partly to resist annexation by Chicago, and in response to annexations by Bridgeview of revenue-generating business areas along Harlem Avenue at Burbank's western end. The city was indirectly named after Luther Burbank Elementary School, an institution which had served the area since the 1940s, as the neighborhood surrounding the school – which included the Stickney Township offices – had come to be known as Burbank Manor. The Stickney Township Park District was established in 1955, and became the Burbank Park District when the city incorporated. The area's population peaked in 1976 at 29,448. The Burbank Police Department was established in 1982; prior to that, the city contracted for police services from the Cook County Sheriff's Office.

== Geography ==
According to the 2021 census gazetteer files, Burbank has a total area of 4.17 square miles (10.80 km^{2}), all land.

== Demographics ==
Historical population
Census	Pop.	Note	%±
1980	28,462		—
1990	27,600		−3.0%
2000	27,902		1.1%
2010	28,925		3.7%
2020	29,439		1.8%
U.S. Decennial Census; 2010 2020

=== Racial and ethnic composition ===
Burbank city, Illinois – Racial and ethnic composition Note: the US Census treats Hispanic/Latino as an ethnic category. This table excludes Latinos from the racial categories and assigns them to a separate category. Hispanics/Latinos may be of any race.
Race / Ethnicity (NH = Non-Hispanic)	Pop 2000	Pop 2010	Pop 2020	% 2000	% 2010	% 2020
White alone (NH)	23,515	19,656	15,703	84.28%	67.96%	53.34%
Black or African American alone (NH)	67	494	518	0.24%	1.71%	1.76%
Native American or Alaska Native alone (NH)	23	35	24	0.08%	0.12%	0.08%
Asian alone (NH)	481	701	906	1.72%	2.42%	3.08%
Pacific Islander alone (NH)	6	4	4	0.02%	0.01%	0.01%
Other race alone (NH)	26	42	79	0.09%	0.15%	0.27%
Mixed race or Multiracial (NH)	689	313	555	2.47%	1.08%	1.89%
Hispanic or Latino (any race)	3,095	7,680	11,650	11.09%	26.55%	39.57%
Total	27,902	28,925	29,439	100.00%	100.00%	100.00%

=== 2020 census ===
As of the 2020 census, Burbank had a population of 29,439 and 9,471 households, including 6,823 families. The median age was 38.2 years; 23.5% of residents were under the age of 18 and 15.1% of residents were 65 years of age or older. For every 100 females there were 99.2 males, and for every 100 females age 18 and over there were 97.6 males age 18 and over.

100.0% of residents lived in urban areas, while 0.0% lived in rural areas.

Households had the following composition: 37.2% had children under the age of 18 living in them; 55.0% were married-couple households, 16.6% were households with a male householder and no spouse or partner present, and 23.5% were households with a female householder and no spouse or partner present. About 20.2% of households were made up of individuals, and 10.1% had someone living alone who was 65 years of age or older.

There were 9,784 housing units at an average density of 2,346.28 per square mile (905.90/km^{2}), of which 3.2% were vacant. The population density was 7,059.71 inhabitants per square mile (2,725.77/km^{2}). The homeowner vacancy rate was 1.1% and the rental vacancy rate was 4.4%.

Racial composition as of the 2020 census
Race	Number	Percent
White	17,766	60.3%
Black or African American	567	1.9%
American Indian and Alaska Native	468	1.6%
Asian	920	3.1%
Native Hawaiian and Other Pacific Islander	10	0.0%
Some other race	5,115	17.4%
Two or more races	4,593	15.6%
Hispanic or Latino (of any race)	11,650	39.6%

=== Income ===
The median income for a household in the city was $70,052, and the median income for a family was $79,422. Males had a median income of $44,447 versus $31,477 for females. The per capita income for the city was $27,505. About 8.3% of families and 10.7% of the population were below the poverty line, including 19.1% of those under age 18 and 6.3% of those age 65 or over.

== Government ==
Burbank has a mayor–council government, with the city council's seven members elected by wards. The city has been in Illinois's 4th congressional district since 2023; it was in the 3rd District from 1983 to 2023, prior to which the area had been in the 4th district from 1973 to 1983 and in the 5th District since the 1940s. Burbank is in the jurisdiction of the 5th Municipal District of the Circuit Court of Cook County, located in Bridgeview.

=== Mayors ===
- John W. Fitzgerald (1970-1991)
- Harry J. Klein (1991-2017)
- Dan M. Foy (2017-2025)
- David E. Gilgenberg II (2025-)

== Transportation ==
Pace provides bus service on multiple routes connecting Burbank to destinations across the southwest side of Chicago and the south suburbs.

== See also ==
- Reavis High School
- Queen of Peace High School
- St. Laurence High School
- Burbank School District 111
- Arnoldo Jimenez
