= Riverside Township, Cook County, Illinois =

Riverside Township
- Township
- logo

- Location in Cook County

- Cook County's location in Illinois
- Coordinates: 41°50′09″N 87°49′24″W
- Country: United States
- State: Illinois
- County: Cook

Government
  - Supervisor: Vera A. Wilt

Area
  - Total: 4.04 sq mi (10.5 km^{2})
  - Land: 4.03 sq mi (10.4 km^{2})
  - Water: 0.02 sq mi (0.052 km^{2}) 0.42%
- Elevation: 617 ft (188 m)

Population (2020)
  - Total: 16,664
  - Density: 4,130/sq mi (1,600/km^{2})
- Time zone: UTC-6 (CST)
  - Summer (DST): UTC-5 (CDT)
- ZIP codes: 60130, 60513, 60534, 60546
- FIPS code: 17-031-64434
- GNIS feature ID: 429647
- Website: riversidetownship.org

Riverside Township is one of 29 townships in Cook County, Illinois, USA. As of the 2020 census, its population was 16,664.

== History ==
Riverside Township was established on September 24, 1870 by the Cook County Board, being split from portions of Proviso Township.

In 2023, during a debate on if all townships should be abolished across Cook County and possibly even Illinois, due to the perception of townships being an unnecessary tax burden to citizens, Riverside Township was used as a counter-example of a well run township which uses its taxes appropriately to service their community with a food bank and medical care. However, in township public support for the government remains low, mostly to a drastic township tax hike in 2021 which saw 70% of residents see a tax hike, with 43% of them seeing their taxes increase from $1,000 to $5,000.

== Geography ==
According to the 2021 census gazetteer files, Riverside Township has a total area of 4.04 square miles (10.46 km^{2}), of which 4.03 square miles (10.44 km^{2}) (or 99.58%) is land and 0.02 square miles (0.05 km^{2}) (or 0.42%) is water.

=== Cities, towns, villages ===
- Brookfield (northeast quarter)
- Lyons (far northeastern edge)
- North Riverside (east three-quarters)
- Riverside (vast majority)

=== Unincorporated Town ===
- Hollywood at 41.82642°N 87.834778°W
- Riverside Lawn at 41.823236°N 87.819225°W

=== Adjacent townships ===
- Berwyn Township (east)
- Stickney Township (southeast)
- Lyons Township (southwest)
- Proviso Township (northwest)

=== Major highways ===
- U.S. Route 34

=== Rivers ===
- Des Plaines River

=== Lakes ===
- Swan Lake

=== Landmarks ===
- Brookfield Zoo Chicago

These Cook County Forest Preserves Woods

- Brookfield Woods (Eastern majority)
- McCormick Woods
- Zoo Woods

== Demographics ==
As of the 2020 census there were 16,664 people, 5,649 households, and 4,096 families residing in the township. The population density was 4,121.69 inhabitants per square mile (1,591.39/km^{2}). There were 6,687 housing units at an average density of 1,653.97 per square mile (638.60/km^{2}). The racial makeup of the township was 72.64% White, 3.06% African American, 0.77% Native American, 2.46% Asian, 0.01% Pacific Islander, 7.89% from other races, and 13.18% from two or more races. Hispanic or Latino of any race were 23.43% of the population.

There were 5,649 households, out of which 33.00% had children under the age of 18 living with them, 53.96% were married couples living together, 13.21% had a female householder with no spouse present, and 27.49% were non-families. 23.70% of all households were made up of individuals, and 9.70% had someone living alone who was 65 years of age or older. The average household size was 2.66 and the average family size was 3.18.

The township's age distribution consisted of 23.7% under the age of 18, 7.6% from 18 to 24, 20.7% from 25 to 44, 31.1% from 45 to 64, and 17.0% who were 65 years of age or older. The median age was 42.5 years. For every 100 females, there were 100.6 males. For every 100 females age 18 and over, there were 96.5 males.

The median income for a household in the township was $87,996, and the median income for a family was $115,962. Males had a median income of $63,795 versus $51,012 for females. The per capita income for the township was $46,224. About 2.6% of families and 3.6% of the population were below the poverty line, including 3.8% of those under age 18 and 3.7% of those age 65 or over.

Historical population
| Census | Pop. | Note | %± |
|---|---|---|---|
| 1930 | 8,769 | | — |
| 1940 | 10,364 | | 18.2% |
| 1950 | 13,636 | | 31.6% |
| 1960 | 17,875 | | 31.1% |
| 1970 | 18,475 | | 3.4% |
| 1980 | 15,930 | | −13.8% |
| 1990 | 15,240 | | −4.3% |
| 2000 | 15,704 | | 3.0% |
| 2010 | 15,594 | | −0.7% |
| 2020 | 16,664 | | 6.9% |
U.S. Decennial Census

== Political districts ==
- Illinois's 3rd congressional district
- State House District 08
- State House District 21
- State House District 41
- State Senate District 04
- State Senate District 11
- State Senate District 21
