= Reavis High School =

High school in Burbank, Illinois

Location
- 6034 W. 77th Street; Burbank, Illinois 60459; United States; 41.7533°N 87.772°W

Information
- School type: Secondary
- Opened: 1950
- School district: Reavis Township High School District 220
- Superintendent: Mr. Eric Novak
- Principal: Dr. Julie A. Schultz
- Staff: 128
- Teaching staff: 111
- Grades: 9-12
- Gender: coed
- Enrollment: 1,893 (2024-2025)
- Student to teacher ratio: 20:1
- Campus type: Suburban
- Colors: Navy Blue; White
- Athletics conference: South Suburban Conference
- Mascot: Ricky the Ram
- Team name: Rams
- Accreditation: Illinois State Board of Education
- Publication: Rampage
- Newspaper: Blueprint
- Yearbook: Aries'
- Radio: WRHS
- Website: official website

William Claude Reavis High School simply known as Reavis is a public high school located in Burbank, Illinois, a near southwest suburb of Chicago. It is named for Dr. William Claude Reavis (1881–1955), a professor at the University of Chicago who played a major role in guaranteeing its completion.

== Academics ==
In 2025, Reavis had an average SAT score of 1120, with 21% of the students reading at grade level and 16% of the students doing math at grade level. The school graduates 86% of its students, and 68% of the graduated students enroll in post-secondary education within 12 to 16 months. Additionally, Reavis also has over 1,000 students participating in career and technical education courses while enrolled at the school.

== Athletics and activities ==
Reavis competes in the South Suburban Conference, which was formed in 2006. Reavis is also member of the Illinois High School Association (IHSA), which governs most sports and competitive activities in the state.

The following Reavis teams won or place top four in their respective state championship tournaments sponsored by the IHSA:

- Baseball: 2nd Place (1983–84)
- Bowling (Girls): 2nd Place (1988–89); 3rd Place (1983–84,1987–88)
- Drama: State Champions (2006–07, 2010–11, 2015–16, 2016–17, 2017–18, 2021–22, 2023-24, 2024-25); 2nd Place (2012–13, 2013–14, 2014–15, 2018-19)
- Football: State Champions (1982–83); 2nd Place (1980–81,1981–82)
- Group Interpretation: State Champions (2012–13, 2021-22, 2022–23); 2nd Place (2016–17); 3rd Place (2003–04, 2008–09)
- Speech: State champions (2024-25); 3rd Place (1971–72)
- Wrestling: State Champions (1960–61,1961–62,1964–65); 3rd Place (1957-28)

Reavis High School was the site for all of the wrestling matches at the 1959 Pan American Games.

== Notable alumni ==
- Lance Dreher (Class of 1973), two-time Mr. Universe and former Mr. America.
- Drew Fortier (Class of 2005), musician, songwriter, filmmaker, actor, and author.
- Ray Hanania (Class of 1971), journalist in the Chicago Southland.
- James Chico Hernandez (Class of 1972), World Cup Silver, 3-time British silver medalist in Sambo wrestling, Amateur Athletic Union Wrestling Hall of Fame, Maine Sports Hall of Fame and Wheaties Fame.
- Tom Lemming, college football recruiting analyst.
- Bobby Madritsch (Class of 1994), former Major League Baseball pitcher (2004–05), playing for the Seattle Mariners.
- Willy Roy (Class of 1961), IHSA State Wrestling Champion 1961. Former professional soccer player, and coach of the Chicago Sting and member of the National Soccer Hall of Fame.
- Brian Gutiérrez (Class of 2021), attacking midfielder for Club Deportivo Guadalajara and Mexico national football team.
