= Stickney, Illinois =

- Village
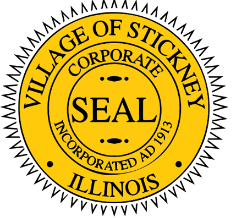
- Seal
- Motto: A Community That Cares
- Location of Stickney in Cook County, Illinois.

- Location within Greater Chicago Location within Illinois Location within the United States
- Coordinates: 41°49′1″N 87°47′12″W
- Country: United States
- State: Illinois
- County: Cook
- Township: Stickney
- Incorporated: 1913

Government
  - Type: Trustee-village
  - President: Jeff Walik

Area
  - Total: 1.96 sq mi (5.08 km^{2})
  - Land: 1.92 sq mi (4.98 km^{2})
  - Water: 0.035 sq mi (0.09 km^{2}) 2.04%

Population (2020)
  - Total: 7,110
  - Density: 3,694.9/sq mi (1,426.59/km^{2})
- Up 10.38% from 2000

Standard of living (2007-11)
  - Per capita income: $21,972
  - Median home value: $204,000
- ZIP code(s): 60402
- Area code(s): 708
- Geocode: 72676
- FIPS code: 17-72676
- Website: www.villageofstickney.com

Stickney is a village in Cook County, Illinois, United States. Per the 2020 census, the population was 7,110. The village is named for Alpheus Beede Stickney, a railroad executive who played a central role in establishing the Clearing Industrial District. It was well known in the 1920s and early 1930s as the home for several bordellos linked to mobster Al Capone's empire. Stickney is home to their horse racetrack, Hawthorne Race Course, but closed down.

== History ==
Before modern settlement, the area now known as Stickney was once covered by Mud Lake, a marshy area that only began to recede after the construction of the Illinois and Michigan Canal. After this, the land where Stickney is became drier, and early residents, such as Dutch and German farmers moved there.

On December 13th, 1913, The Village of Stickney was officially incorporated. It was named after native of Maine, Alpheaus Beede Stickney, who was the president of the Chicago Great Western Railway. Starting in the 1920s, neighboring communities such as Berwyn, and Cicero started to expand, as well as Stickney. Around that time, criminals including Al Capone moved in, establishing speakeasies and brothels.

Following the conclusion of World War II, Home construction in Stickney peaked because of a great quantity of vacant land and the village allowing people with government-issued bonds to build on the land with unpaid taxes. In 1949, the Commonwealth Edison (ComEd) began construction on a coal-powered generator which served the communities of both Stickney, and neighboring Forest Park. Stickney is also known for having the world's largest sewage treatment plant, operated by the Metropolitan Water Reclamation District of Greater Chicago.

== Geography ==
Stickney is located at 41°49′1″N 87°47′12″W (41.816982, -87.786755).

According to the 2010 census, Stickney has a total area of 1.966 square miles (5.09 km^{2}), of which 1.93 square miles (5.00 km^{2}) (or 98.17%) is land and 0.036 square miles (0.09 km^{2}) (or 1.83%) is water.

== Demographics ==
Historical population
Census	Pop.	Note	%±
1920	550		—
1930	2,005		264.5%
1940	2,446		22.0%
1950	3,317		35.6%
1960	6,239		88.1%
1970	6,601		5.8%
1980	5,893		−10.7%
1990	5,678		−3.6%
2000	6,148		8.3%
2010	6,786		10.4%
2020	7,110		4.8%
U.S. Decennial Census; 2010 2020

=== Racial and ethnic composition ===
Stickney village, Illinois – Racial and ethnic composition Note: the US Census treats Hispanic/Latino as an ethnic category. This table excludes Latinos from the racial categories and assigns them to a separate category. Hispanics/Latinos may be of any race.
Race / Ethnicity (NH = Non-Hispanic)	Pop 2000	Pop 2010	Pop 2020	% 2000	% 2010	% 2020
White alone (NH)	4,689	3,034	2,111	76.27%	44.71%	29.69%
Black or African American alone (NH)	17	138	168	0.28%	2.03%	2.36%
Native American or Alaska Native alone (NH)	11	3	11	0.18%	0.04%	0.15%
Asian alone (NH)	65	98	91	1.06%	1.44%	1.28%
Native Hawaiian or Pacific Islander alone (NH)	0	4	1	0.00%	0.06%	0.01%
Other race alone (NH)	0	4	38	0.00%	0.06%	0.53%
Mixed race or Multiracial (NH)	43	53	122	0.70%	0.78%	1.72%
Hispanic or Latino (any race)	1,323	3,452	4,568	21.52%	50.87%	64.25%
Total	6,148	6,786	7,110	100.00%	100.00%	100.00%

=== 2020 census ===
As of the 2020 census, Stickney had a population of 7,110. The median age was 37.5 years. 24.1% of residents were under the age of 18 and 14.1% of residents were 65 years of age or older. For every 100 females there were 99.2 males, and for every 100 females age 18 and over there were 98.4 males age 18 and over.

100.0% of residents lived in urban areas, while 0.0% lived in rural areas.

There were 2,418 households in Stickney, of which 39.5% had children under the age of 18 living in them. Of all households, 46.6% were married-couple households, 22.0% were households with a male householder and no spouse or partner present, and 24.7% were households with a female householder and no spouse or partner present. About 23.0% of all households were made up of individuals and 9.4% had someone living alone who was 65 years of age or older. There were 1,617 families residing in the village.

There were 2,523 housing units, of which 4.2% were vacant. The homeowner vacancy rate was 1.5% and the rental vacancy rate was 2.6%.

=== Income and poverty ===
The median income for a household in the village was $67,246, and the median income for a family was $87,997. Males had a median income of $47,361 versus $38,373 for females. The per capita income for the village was $27,977. About 2.3% of families and 7.5% of the population were below the poverty line, including 4.5% of those under age 18 and 16.6% of those age 65 or over.

== Government ==
Stickney is in Illinois's 3rd congressional district.

== Education ==
Stickney has two public elementary schools, Home School and Edison School, part of Lyons Elementary School District 103, both serving grades K-5. Students then attend George Washington Middle School in Lyons for grades 6–8.

Residents are zoned Morton West High School in Berwyn for grades 9–12 as all residents are west of Ridgeland Avenue.

The village had previously hosted Haley School which was built in 1923 and demolished in 1987; its land later being converted into Haley Park in 1989, and MacArthur School (41st and Cuyler) which was closed and later demolished. St Pius X Church had an elementary school which was closed in the 90s.

== Transportation ==
Bus service in the village is provided by CTA and Pace.
