= Chip Wilson =

Canadian businessman (born 1955)

- Born: Dennis J. Wilson; April 25, 1955 (age 71); Los Angeles, California, U.S.
- Citizenship: United States; Canada
- Education: University of Calgary (BA)
- Occupations: Businessman, investor, philanthropist
- Known for: Founder of Lululemon Athletica
- Spouses: Nancy Herb (former); Shannon Wilson (m. 2002)
- Children: 5

Dennis J. "Chip" Wilson (born April 25, 1955) is an American-Canadian businessman and philanthropist who has founded several retail apparel companies, most notably the yoga-inspired athletic apparel company Lululemon Athletica. As of March 2025, Forbes estimates his net worth to be US$5.7 billion.

Wilson is widely regarded as the progenitor and a pioneering figure of the athleisure phenomenon, which has permeated mainstream North American society since its emergence in 2014.

== Early life and education ==
Dennis J. "Chip" Wilson was born on April 25, 1955 in Los Angeles, California. He grew up in an athletic environment along with his two siblings, his Canadian father Dennis Wilson being an ice hockey and football player, and his American mother Ruth Noel being a gymnast. His parents met while they were attending Brigham Young University, as his father played football there. After his father stopped playing football, his parents did not earn much from their athletic endeavours. His father worked for UPS, while his stay-at-home mother sewed, exposing Wilson to a wide variety of fabrics. When Wilson was five, the family moved to his father's hometown of Calgary, Alberta, where Wilson got involved in competitive swimming. When Wilson was twelve, his parents filed for divorce with both of them remarrying afterwards.

Wilson moved to Edmonton to attend the University of Alberta and play football there. However he postponed his education to move to Fairbanks, Alaska, and work for the oil industry, before returning to Calgary and graduating with a bachelor's degree in economics from the University of Calgary in 1980.

== Business career ==
In 1979, Wilson founded his first retail apparel company, Westbeach Snowboard Ltd, which sold apparel targeted at the surf, skate, and snowboard markets. He sold Westbeach in 1997 and founded Lululemon Athletica in 1998.

Wilson was CEO of Lululemon until 2005, when he sold a 48% stake to private equity firms Advent International and Highland Capital Partners. In 2007, an IPO was offered by Lululemon Athletica Inc. on Canadian and US exchanges. In January 2012, Wilson retired from his executive post as chief innovation and branding officer, but remained chairman of the board of directors. In December 2013, he stepped down from his role as non-executive chairman.

In June 2014, Wilson raised concerns that the Lululemon board was not aligned with the core values of product and innovation on which the company was founded, and on which it thrived. Six months after the board's reconstitution, the company's share price rose from a June 2014 low of $36.26 to $65.33, a change in market capitalization of over $4 billion.

In August 2014, Wilson sold 13.85% of his ownership in Lululemon to Advent for approximately $845 million.

In February 2015, Wilson stepped down from Lululemon's board of directors, saying, "I have achieved the goals I set when I came back, and after careful thought, I believe that now is the right time to step away from the board. I leave behind a new and talented management team and new board construct."

In December 2015, in an interview with Bloomberg Business, Wilson said, "Three years ago, when I was chairman and Lululemon was worth twice as much as Under Armour, I personally was thinking of buying Under Armour."

In June 2016, Wilson published an open letter to shareholders of Lululemon stating that it had "lost its way" and given up market share to Nike and Under Armour, after he was denied the opportunity to speak at the company's annual meetings.

In 2016, Wilson created House of Wilson, a holding company that includes Wilson Capital, Wilson 5 Foundation, and Low Tide Properties.

In 2019, Wilson sold millions of shares for about $800 million while the stock rallied, further reducing his stake in the company.

== Influence ==
Wilson openly shared that he came up with name "Lululemon" because he felt that the difficulty Japanese people have in pronouncing the "L" sound would be beneficial to the company's marketing efforts in Japan.

Wilson has often mentioned the influence of philosopher Ayn Rand on shaping his entrepreneurial and personal philosophy, often alluding to passages from the novel Atlas Shrugged. This influence was so strong at Lululemon that they once produced shopping bags with the phrase "Who is John Galt?" printed on them.

Chip Wilson cites much of his inspiration arising from the "Personal Development" program Landmark Forum (formerly EST). Employees of Lululemon report pressure from their superiors to attend Landmark Forum seminars, paid for by Lululemon. In response to suggestions that people take the Landmark Forum courses for fear of reprisal, Wilson said "They are not going to be happy in the company, so they might as well find another place to work."

In October 2025, Wilson took out of full-page ad in the Wall Street Journal calling out Lululemon for making poor business strategy choices. In March 2026, he started a proxy contest, which included launching a website, calling for change at Lululemon and nominating candidates for board director. By May 2026, Wilson and Lululemon reached an agreement, one that included adding two of Wilson's nominees to the board, and a clause which prevents Wilson from 'badmouthing' the company for 18-months.

== Wealth and investments ==
Wilson is listed on the Forbes World Billionaires List, currently ranked the 574th richest person in the world. He is also credited by Business Insider and Forbes as being the 8th richest person in Canada.

Wilson is a partner with Anta Sports, a sportswear company based in Jinjiang China, with whom he purchased Amer Sports after looking to acquire Amer on his own. Wilson acquired a 20.65% stake in the joint venture that acquired Amer, along with Anta and FountainVest Partners.

While no longer the CEO of Lululemon, Wilson remains the largest individual shareholder in the company, with 10,955,225 shares or 8.75%, as of July 2, 2021. In 2016, he consolidated all of his personal and business interests into the Vancouver-based holding company called House of Wilson.

As of October 2024, his net worth is estimated at $5.3 billion, making him the 11th richest Canadian, and 626th in the world.

== Other activities and philanthropy ==
In 2007, Wilson and his wife, Shannon Wilson, launched imagine1day, a charity dedicated to improving education conditions in Ethiopia. The organization's goal is for all Ethiopians to have access to quality education free of foreign aid funding by 2030. As of June 2016, imagine1day had 487 partner schools, 35 of them built from the ground up by its team. Also, 1,130 school clubs had been created, with half run by girls. 66,420 books, 180 science kits, and 160 sports sets had been provided to students. Imagine1day estimates that over 252,000 lives are transformed annually through its education and training.

The Chip and Shannon Wilson School of Design at Kwantlen Polytechnic University is a $36 million project. Chip and Shannon Wilson pledged $12 million to the school with the goal of solidifying the future of BC's technical apparel industry. Lululemon, Kwantlen Polytechnic University, and the Province of British Columbia are additional financial partners. The school broke ground in fall 2013 and will include new teaching studios, gallery space for student exhibitions, and a "usability lab" where students can design, prototype, and market product concepts. The school was scheduled to open in 2015 and was expected to increase the number of design students by 57%.

Wilson and his wife are sponsors of the annual Child Run. The Child Run is the largest family fun run in Vancouver, British Columbia, with a 5 km for runners and walkers on a route through Queen Elizabeth Park and a 1 km fun run, followed by a carnival celebration. Proceeds support British Columbia's Children's Hospital and its fight against childhood cancer. In 2014, the run had over 6,000 participants and raised over $1 million.

In 2013, Wilson and his spouse launched Whil.com, a website designed "to convince professionals to meditate a few times a day in increments of just 60 seconds" by making it more accessible.

Frequently involved in the funding, acquisition, and donation of public art, Wilson has donated a number of public artworks he has funded. This includes A-maze-ing Laughter, by Yue Minjun, and the Trans-Am Totem, by Marcus Bowcott.

Along with his wife, Shannon, Wilson pledged $100 million to BC Parks Foundation for the preservation and protection of British Columbia's ecosystem in perpetuity. In 2021, after a lengthy search for investment, the BC Parks Foundation acquired three at-risk, bio-diverse islands in British Columbia, with a $4 million donation from Wilson and his family. The islands - West Ballenas, Saturnina, and part Lasqueti - will not be developed, as a result.

== Social and political views ==
Wilson has expressed multiple views regarding politics, the facilitation of Lululemon, and women's health, some of which received controversy and negative reception.

In a 2009 blog post on Lululemon's website titled "How Lululemon came into being," Wilson wrote: "Women's lives changed immediately. Men's lives didn't change however and they continued to search for a stay-at-home wife like their mothers. Men did not know how to relate to the new female. Thus came the era of divorces." In the same blog post, Wilson also shared his views on birth control, writing "Females no longer had to 'make' relationships work because with birth control came a sense of financial and life control. A sense of equality was established because women no longer had to relinquish their independence to a male provider."

In his book titled Little Black Stretchy Pants, Wilson wrote that he is not necessarily opposed to child labour, as "working young is excellent training for life. In North America, I noticed that there were some kids not made for school, who dropped out with nowhere to go. In Asia, if a kid was not 'school material,' he or she learned a trade and contributed to their family. It was work or starve. I liked the working alternative."

In 2013, on Bloomberg Television, when asked by a reporter concerning customer's complaints on why there was pilling on the fabric of Lululemon's yoga pants, to which Wilson replied, "Frankly some women’s bodies just actually don’t work for [wearing Lululemon pants]… it’s really about the rubbing through the thighs, how much pressure is there over a period of time, how much they use it." Wilson appeared in a CBS interview in 2015 where he apologized for past statements regarding the Lululemon yoga pant scandal, saying, "I'm responsible for what comes out of my mouth. And if that's what was interpreted then I fully apologize. Yeah. I'm sorry."

In early 2024, Wilson expressed concern over Lululemon's diversity and inclusion policy saying in a Forbes interview: "they’re trying to become like the Gap, everything to everybody." He also criticized an advertisement made by the company featuring plus-sized women models, whom he said looked "unhealthy," "sickly" and "not inspirational." These statements were seen as offensive, with Time reporting them to be "fat-phobic". Lululemon was quick to distance themselves from Wilson's comments, saying, "Chip Wilson does not speak for Lululemon, and his comments do not reflect our company views or beliefs."

In October 2024, a sign went up at Wilson's home in British Columbia. The sign criticized British Columbia premier David Eby, reading "Eby will tell you the Conservatives are 'Far right' but neglects saying that the NDP is 'Communist.'" It is unclear who put up the sign. David Eby responded by saying, "When you are so rich that the Red Hot Chili Peppers play your birthday party, it's possible to lose perspective. I would just say to Mr. Wilson: People are struggling out there, and we need to provide support to them." The sign and the home were later vandalized with graffiti insulting Wilson. On October 7, 2024, a second sign went up at Wilson's residence, which reads, "Voters seem to forget when Eby 'gives' us money, it is the Voters' money he has already taken."

Wilson has used his website "Elevate Lululemon" to criticise the brand and current business practises.

== Personal life ==
Wilson has five sons, two from his first marriage to Nancy Herb. He married Shannon Wilson in 2002, who is one of the original designers of Lululemon and co-founder of Kit and Ace with Wilson's son JJ Wilson. The family reside in Vancouver, British Columbia.

Wilson was diagnosed with a subtype of muscular dystrophy called facioscapulohumeral muscular dystrophy at age 32. He has donated 100 million Canadian dollars towards research.

In September 2026, the Wilsons announced that they are divorcing.. While Wilson is considered a 'shrewd' businessman, the couple do not have a pre-nuptial.
