= Berwyn Route 66 Museum =

- Museum location on US 66 in Illinois
- Established: January 2011
- Dissolved: 2017
- Location: 7003 W. Ogden Ave., Berwyn, Illinois
- Coordinates: 41.82545°N 87.7976°W
- Type: Route 66 Museum
- Director: Jon Fey
- Website: www.il66assoc.org/destination/berwyn-route-66-museum

The Berwyn Route 66 Museum was a small not-for-profit facility, located at 7003 Ogden Ave, in Berwyn, Illinois, and which documented the history of the former U.S. Route 66. The museum closed in late 2016 or early 2017.

== Context ==
The path of Route 66 traveled through the city of Berwyn along Ogden Avenue, a main thoroughfare through Chicago and its western suburbs; the section of the route that passed through Berwyn was known as Automobile Row during the route’s heyday. In Illinois, the original path of the former Route 66 has been federally designated a National Scenic Byway known as the Illinois Route 66 Scenic Byway, so that Ogden Avenue is once again part of Historic Route 66.

The museum opened in January 2011 in a storefront at 7003 W. Ogden Ave. and shared space with the Berwyn Arts Council, a local community arts organization that had a small gallery within the museum. The museum's mission was to discover, present and preserve the history and culture of Route 66, in particular the section that passed through Berwyn. The museum’s executive director was Jon Fey, who is also a board member of the arts council. Information, artifacts and memorabilia about Route 66 and Automobile Row were stored and displayed at the museum, which also made its data available to researchers by appointment. The museum was staffed entirely by volunteers; its docent was Myles Slaughter, and Tony Lavorato was in charge of collections research.

== History ==
The museum’s beginnings were two display cases of memorabilia set up in 1994 in the former Skylite Restaurant on Ogden Avenue near Ridgeland Avenue by Larry Ohler of the volunteer group known as Berwyn Preservation of Historic Route 66, a committee of the Berwyn Development Corp. Ohler had collected the material. The displays were later moved to Anderson Ford, a dealership formerly located on Ogden Avenue (the dealership closed in 2009, and the building was repurposed during the spring of 2012). Fey’s company SWF Products, which owns the building in which the museum was housed, offered the space so that the collection could have a home of its own. The story of the museum was described in an article by Jon Fey, "The Berwyn Route 66 Museum: creating a tourist destination on Route 66", published in the Illinois Geographer, vol.56 no.2, Fall 2015, pages 29-35.

== Programming ==
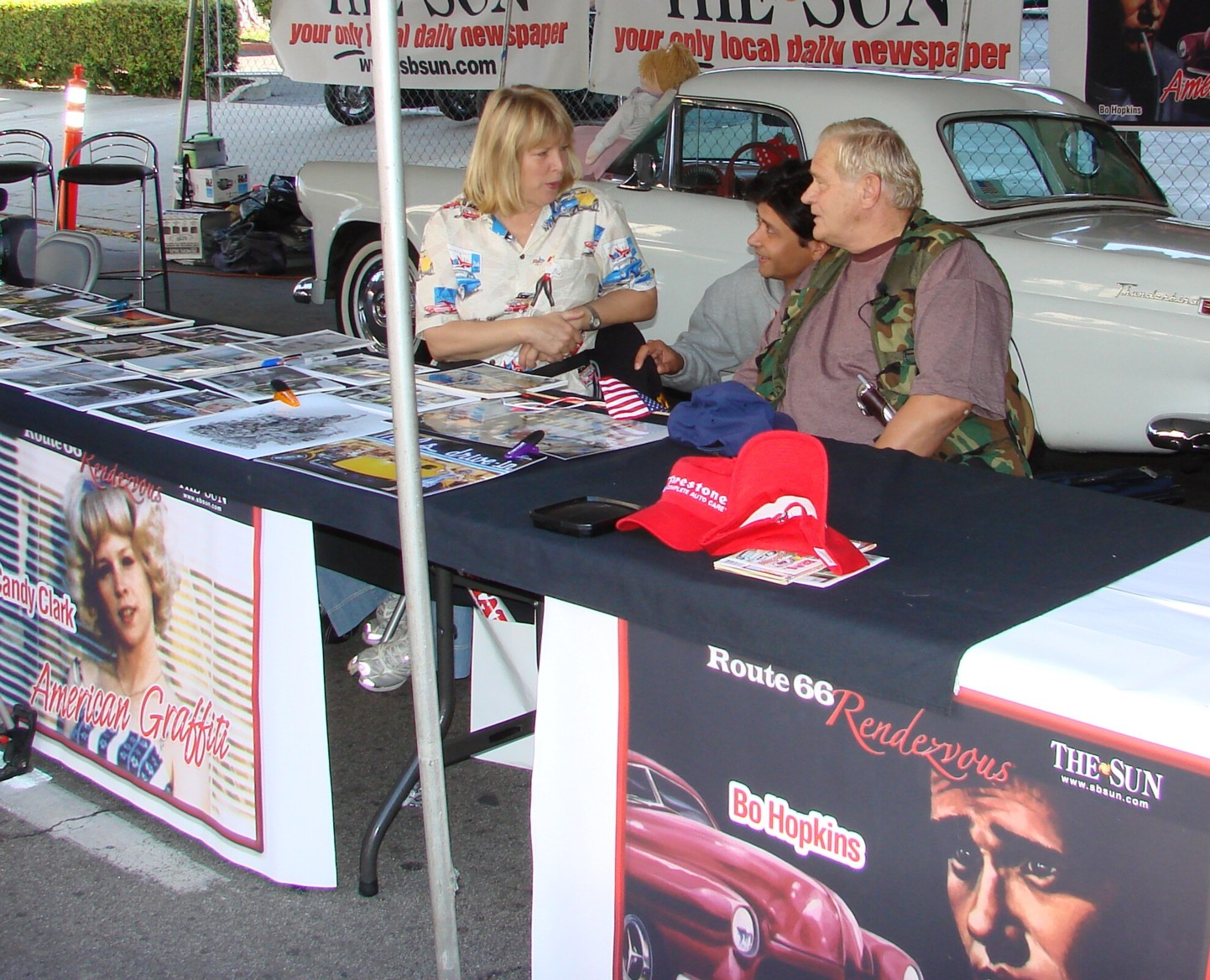
Car show at Route 66 in 2006

The Berwyn Route 66 Museum was perhaps best known for its co-sponsorship of the Historic Route 66 Car Show, an annual event held on the first Saturday of September that features classic and custom cars, trucks and motorcycles and has been organized by that same local Route 66 preservation group since 1990. In addition to being reported locally, the event has been covered by specialty automobile media such as the Auto Channel. The museum also occasionally sponsors other events, including book events featuring authors who have written about U.S. Route 66 in Illinois. In addition, the Berwyn Arts Council stages art showings at the museum's gallery; one such display has been a collection of artistic interpretations of automobile hub caps.

The museum was engaged in fundraising to support two future installations. The first was the restoration and relocation of the historic Art Moderne neon-illuminated glass-block Berwyn Route 66 welcome sign to the museum grounds; the sign previously stood on the north side of Ogden Avenue just west of Lombard Avenue in front of a CITGO gas station, where a Route 66 multimedia information kiosk erected by the Illinois Route 66 Scenic Byway authority now stands. The glass-block marker was removed by the city during the summer of 2012 due to damage and was replaced at that time by the multimedia kiosk.

The second project was the partial reassembly of the 1989 Dustin Shuler Pop Art sculpture known as The Spindle. The Spindle, which had eight cars mounted vertically on a pole and stood 40 feet tall in the Cermak Plaza shopping center in Berwyn, was commissioned by shopping mall developer and modern art collector David Bermant, who contributed his own silver-blue 1976 BMW New Class sedan to the assembly (it was mounted second from the top; the license plate reads DAVE). Shuler's own 1967 red Volkswagen Beetle was mounted at the top. The Spindle was installed in 1989 and disassembled and removed in 2008 after attempts to find a buyer failed. At the time of the sculpture's removal, the top two cars (Shuler's VW and Bermant's BMW) were saved and stored by museum director Fey.

The red VW was on display at the 2012 Berwyn Car Show, where museum volunteers circulated information and petitions to gain support for the rehabilitation of the sculpture's remains. The glass-block illuminated sign, on the other hand, has been temporarily placed in storage by the museum in order to keep it from further damage until funds are sufficient for its restoration and reinstallation at the museum, Fey said.

The Route 66 Museum had the additional distinction of having one of Berwyn’s three electrical charging stations for electric cars and trucks located on its front doorstep.

The museum was open Mondays through Fridays 10:00 a.m. to 4:00 p.m., except holidays, and other hours by appointment.

== Gift shop ==
Some of the artifact of this museum

The former location of the museum has been turned into a gift shop. The restored original (1990s) Berwyn Route 66 entry marker can be seen displayed in the parking lot adjacent to the gift shop, along with a "distance marker pole", the large school bell from Berwyn's early 1900s LaVergne School and a 12' x 15' wall mural panel with a full color Route 66 Shield. It is open 9 to 5 M-F and closed Saturday and Sunday.

== See also ==
- Spindle (sculpture)
- Dustin Shuler
- U.S. Route 66 and U.S. Route 66 in Illinois
- List of Route 66 museums
- Illinois Route 4
- Interstate 55 in Illinois
