= Shannon Wilson =

Canadian fashion designer, businesswoman, and philanthropist

Shannon "Summer" Wilson is a Canadian fashion designer, businesswoman, artist, and philanthropist. She is best known for her former role as lead designer at the yoga apparel company Lululemon Athletica. In 2014, she founded Kit and Ace, a technical luxury apparel company.

== Education ==
Wilson received her BFA in fashion design from the University of Victoria.

== Business ==
In 2014, Wilson and her stepson JJ Wilson founded Kit and Ace, a luxury T-shirt retailer made with a proprietary cashmere blend. The first studio pop-up location opened in Vancouver in July of that year.

== Other activities ==
In 2007, along with her husband, Chip Wilson, founder of Lululemon Athletica, she established imagine1day, a nonprofit organization committed to bringing primary education to 80 percent of children in Ethiopia by 2030. In 2012, the Wilson family donated $1.5 million to the Vancouver Biennale. The donation paid for a metal sculpture designed by Yue Minjun, titled A-maze-ing Laughter, which currently sits in Morton Park, Vancouver.

In 2022, the Wilsons donated $100M to the BC Parks Foundation, the largest conservation donation in Canadian history, to protect and preserve British Columbia's ecosystem.

In 2024, Wilson debuted her first art collection, Organic Formulas.

== Personal life ==
In September 2026, Wilson announced that she would be divorcing her husband, Chip.

== Awards and honours ==
In 2014, Wilson received an honorary doctorate from the Emily Carr University of Art and Design. In 2015, she and her husband received an honorary doctorate from Kwantlen Polytechnic University.
