= Luvo Inc. =

Canadian frozen food company

- Type: Consumer Packaged Goods
- Industry: Private
- Founder: Stephen Sidwell
- Headquarters: Vancouver, Canada
- Area served: United States, British Columbia and Ontario, Canada
- Key people: Christine M. Day (CEO)
- Products: Frozen entrées and burritos
- Website: Luvo Inc.

Luvo Inc. [loo- vō] is a privately held frozen food company that develops, manufactures, markets and sells retail food products. Its products are sold by retail chains in the United States and grocery stores in British Columbia and Ontario, Canada. Luvo products are also served on some Delta Air Lines' flights.

== History ==
Luvo was launched in 2013 to sell trans-fat free and nutrition-focused frozen entrées through Publix, Safeway and Amazon. In January 2014, Christine M. Day invested in the company and became CEO. She was previously the CEO of lululemon athletica and also spent 20 years at Starbucks, eventually becoming the head of Asia-Pacific division.

Luvo's head office is based in Vancouver, British Columbia, Canada. Products are manufactured and sold in both the United States and in Canada.

== Products ==
=== Menu ===
Luvo has nearly 30 different products listed on its website. It divides their product categories into entrées, breakfasts, flatbreads and burritos. It also has an exclusive line of products for Delta Air Lines.

=== Packaging and preparation ===
Luvo products can be prepared in the oven or microwave. The company has a patented technology that allows the food to be cooked evenly in a paper pouch. The packaging allows the food to be steam-cooked and is modeled after the traditional French cooking method "en papillote".

== Brand ambassadors ==
Luvo has a brand ambassador program with professional athletes who are also investors. In June 2013, the five-time World Series champion and former New York Yankees captain Derek Jeter became a partner of Luvo. A New York Daily News article said that Jeter grew up eating fast food, though he now promotes healthy eating and lifestyle choices through his Turn 2 Foundation.

In June 2015, Luvo announced the American football player, Russell Wilson, as a brand ambassador. Wilson is the founder of summer football camps called Passing Academy which teach children and teenagers (ages 8 –17) "fundamental skills of a great football player", including food choices.

On August 10, 2015, the Olympic swimmer Natalie Coughlin became a brand ambassador and investor in Luvo.
