= Kit and Ace =

Canadian clothing brand

- Industry: Retail
- Founded: 2014
- Founder: Shannon Wilson; J. J. Wilson
- Headquarters: Vancouver, British Columbia, Canada
- Number of locations: 6 (2024)
- Products: Technical apparel
- Owner: Joe Mimran; Frank Rocchetti; David Lui
- Website: www.kitandace.com

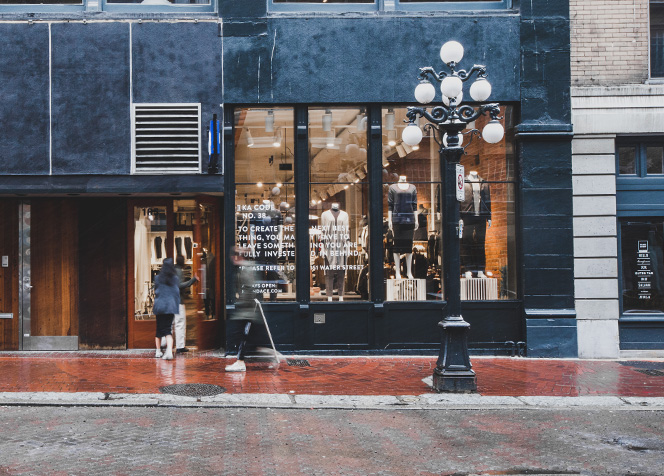
Kit and Ace flagship location, Water Street, Gastown, Vancouver

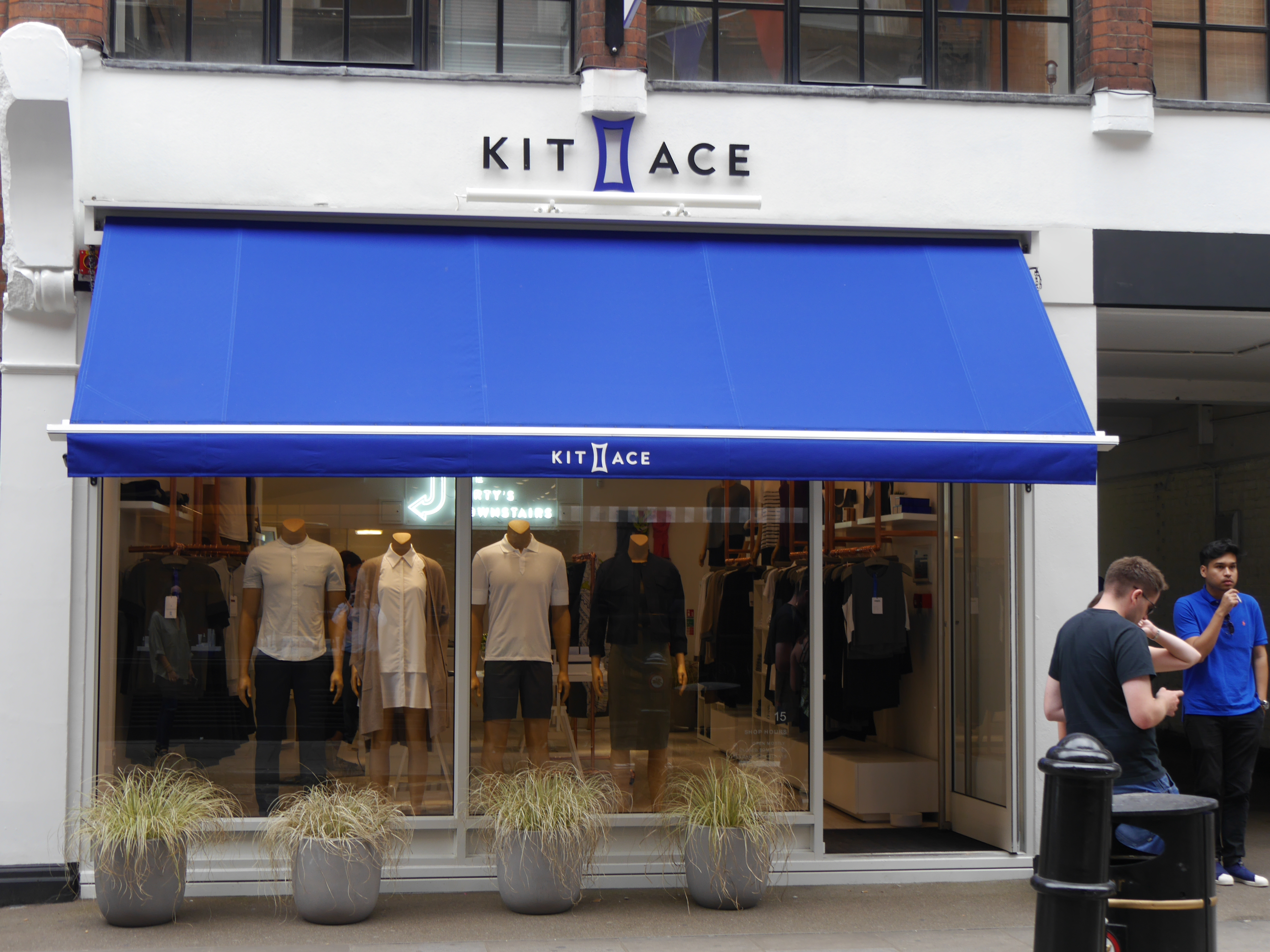
Kit and Ace, Monmouth Street, Covent Garden, London. This location has since closed

Kit and Ace is a Canadian clothing brand founded in 2014 by Shannon Wilson, former lead designer of Lululemon Athletica, and her stepson J. J. Wilson. Its focus is machine-washable cashmere wool clothing and accessories. It is currently owned by Unity Brands Inc.

== History ==
The first store opened in July 2014 in Vancouver's Gastown neighbourhood.

In 2015, the brand opened retail stores in the US, the UK and Australia.

In September 2015, the company installed shop-in-shop cafes from Toronto-based Sorry Coffee Co. in its London and Toronto stores.

In April 2017, Kit and Ace closed all its international stores to focus on e-commerce and its eight Canadian shops. Hold It All Inc., a Vancouver-based company, owned the brand until the end of August 2018.

In 2018, CEO George Tsogas acquired the company.

In 2018, the Navigator pant was featured as part of the "Ultimate Travel Gear" of 2018 by Air Canada's enRoute Magazine.

In November 2019, Kit and Ace opens its first West Vancouver location in The Village, Park Royal.

In December 2020, Kit and Ace returned to Edmonton opening a new location on Whyte Ave.

In June 2022, Kit and Ace opened a new location on Queen Street, Toronto.

In July 2023, Kit and Ace was acquired by Unity Brands Inc. under the ownership of veteran retail executives Joe Mimran, David Lui and Frank Rocchetti.
