= Yoga pants =

Leisurewear

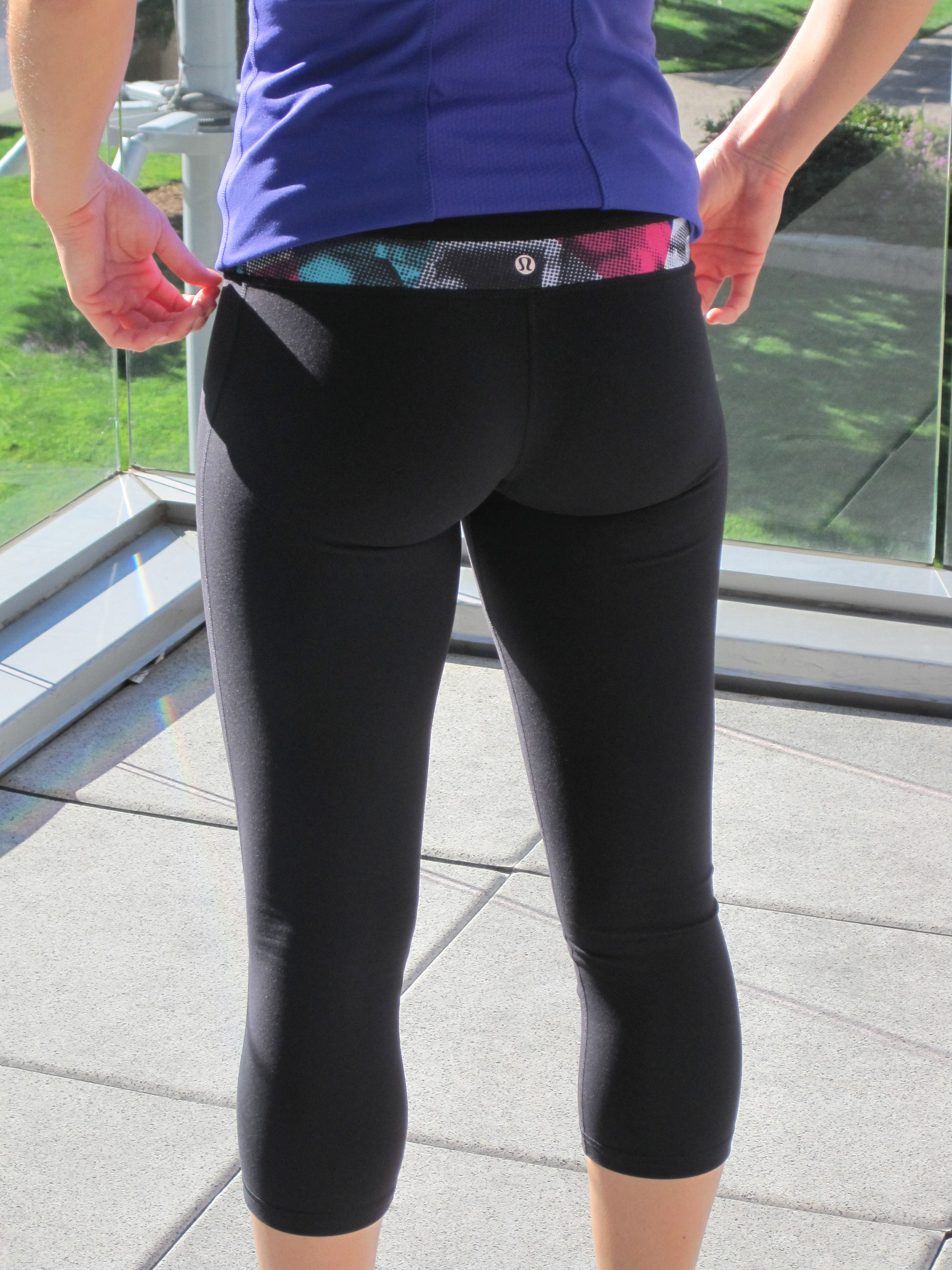
- Type: Athleisure, dancewear, sportswear
- Inventor: Chip Wilson
- Inception: 1998
- Manufacturer: Lululemon, then many others

Yoga pants are high-denier hosiery reaching from ankle to waist, originally designed for yoga as exercise and first sold in 1998 by Lululemon, a company founded for that purpose. They were initially made of a mix of nylon and Lycra; more specialised fabrics have been introduced to provide moisture-wicking, compression, and odour reduction.

The market has increased both through the popularity of yoga and because many women wear yoga pants as casual everyday dress. This is part of a long-term "athleisure" trend of increasing informality in dress, threatening sales of traditional jeans.

In the U.S., the wearing of yoga pants other than for exercise has aroused controversy, both for school use and when worn by women. Global sales of yoga clothing have all the same grown rapidly, reaching some $31 billion by 2018.

== Origins ==
Yoga originated in India as a spiritual practice. In India in the early 20th century, the postures of medieval haṭha yoga were combined with movements from gymnastics, creating a new tradition of postural yoga. By the 1990s, this had become a popular form of exercise across the Western world, especially for women.

Yoga pants made of nylon and Lycra appeared on the market in 1998, sold by Lululemon in its first store in Vancouver, Canada as suitable attire for the yoga studio. Lululemon's founder, Chip Wilson, is said to have attended a yoga class in 1997 where the instructor was wearing "slinky dance attire" that fitted like a second skin, reportedly inspiring him to found his yoga fashion business. In 2005 Lululemon introduced a stretch fabric (Luon) with more nylon microfibre and less polyester, followed by several more specialised fabrics: a four-way stretch moisture-wicking fabric (Luxtreme), a compression fabric (Nulux), and an odour-reducing fabric containing silver as an antibacterial (Silverescent). Yoga pants increased in popularity, to the point where by 2014 American teenagers preferred them to jeans; the jeans manufacturer Levi Strauss, threatened with "an existential crisis", was obliged to make some of its jeans stretchy. Yoga pants took some years to spread around the world; the first Lululemon store in Europe opened in 2014, in Covent Garden, London. Numerous competitors entered the market, some of them such as Nike, Adidas, and Target also offering specialised fabrics.

== Types ==
Styles and brands of yoga pants are available at a wide range of prices, determined primarily by brand: in 2015, a high-end pair from the specialist retailer Lululemon cost $98, whereas a less well-known brand sold by the general retailer Target cost $20. By 2018, there were over 11,000 types, according to Bloomberg, with a style by Lucas High on sale for as much as $230.

Styles include the traditional boot-cut and flared yoga pants with a flat waistband. Basic yoga pants are black, tight-fitted, boot-cut, flared, and reversible; they are made of a four-way stretch fabric, with a flat elastic waistband at the top. They provide flexibility and comfort, wicking moisture away from the body and helping to keep the wearer cool and comfortable. They may be made from blends of cotton, Lycra spandex, nylon, polyester, wool, or similar light and stretchy synthetic material giving the pants a soft, smooth finish.

== Usage ==
Many members of this yoga class are wearing yoga pants; others wear shorts or tracksuit bottoms.

Yoga pants have migrated from the yoga studio to the high street; from the early 2010s, they have increasingly been used as everyday casual wear. Some women wear them around the house, as maternity wear, and for dancing. Yoga pants have even been adopted as office wear; in 2014, Betabrand's "dress pant yoga pants" became its bestselling product. Fortune suggested that these could be paired with high-heeled shoes and a smart blouse to help them fit in.Jessica Grose, writing in Slate, responded that whatever was done to yoga pants to make them look more like dress pants (business suit trousers), they were still leggings. Suzanne Wexler, writing in the Vancouver Sun, agreed, calling yoga pants with heels and blouse "a fashion faux pas". The Atlantic however suggested, based on a preliminary 2012 study of "enclothed cognition", (Note: Compare Embodied cognition.) that wearing active clothing might encourage people to exercise more.

The fashion historian Amanda Hallay said that women want to look as if they are running to the gym, whether they are or not. Another fashion historian, Deirdre Clemente, states that athleisure clothing arrived when three trends came together: the technical improvement of fibres to create strong, long-lasting and flexible materials such as spandex; a Western fascination for appearing extremely healthy; and the decline of formality in clothing, allowing yoga clothing to blend into office wear. In Clemente's view, all three of these trends developed slowly throughout the 20th century. Rachel Marlow, writing in Vogue, said that yoga pants had become acceptable wear for women "on the school run, in the line for morning coffee, over a business lunch, or even drinks".

Demand for comfortable active, athletic, sports and casual wear has increased since the turn of the 21st century. Nike, Inc. reported their women's business comprised $7 billion in 2010. The larger athleisure market grew to $33.6 billion by 2015, and $48 billion by 2018. Nike claims the driving factor has been the demand for fashionable and flattering workout gear. New colours, patterns, and structural designs have created more versatility and increased the wearing of yoga pants in public settings. Author Mae Anderson, writing in The Denver Post in 2013, called yoga pants the "new jeans". Hollie Shaw, writing in the Financial Post in 2015, talked about the "Lululemon effect" which had replaced jeans with yoga pants and observed that men too were starting to wear them instead of denim.

== Social issues ==
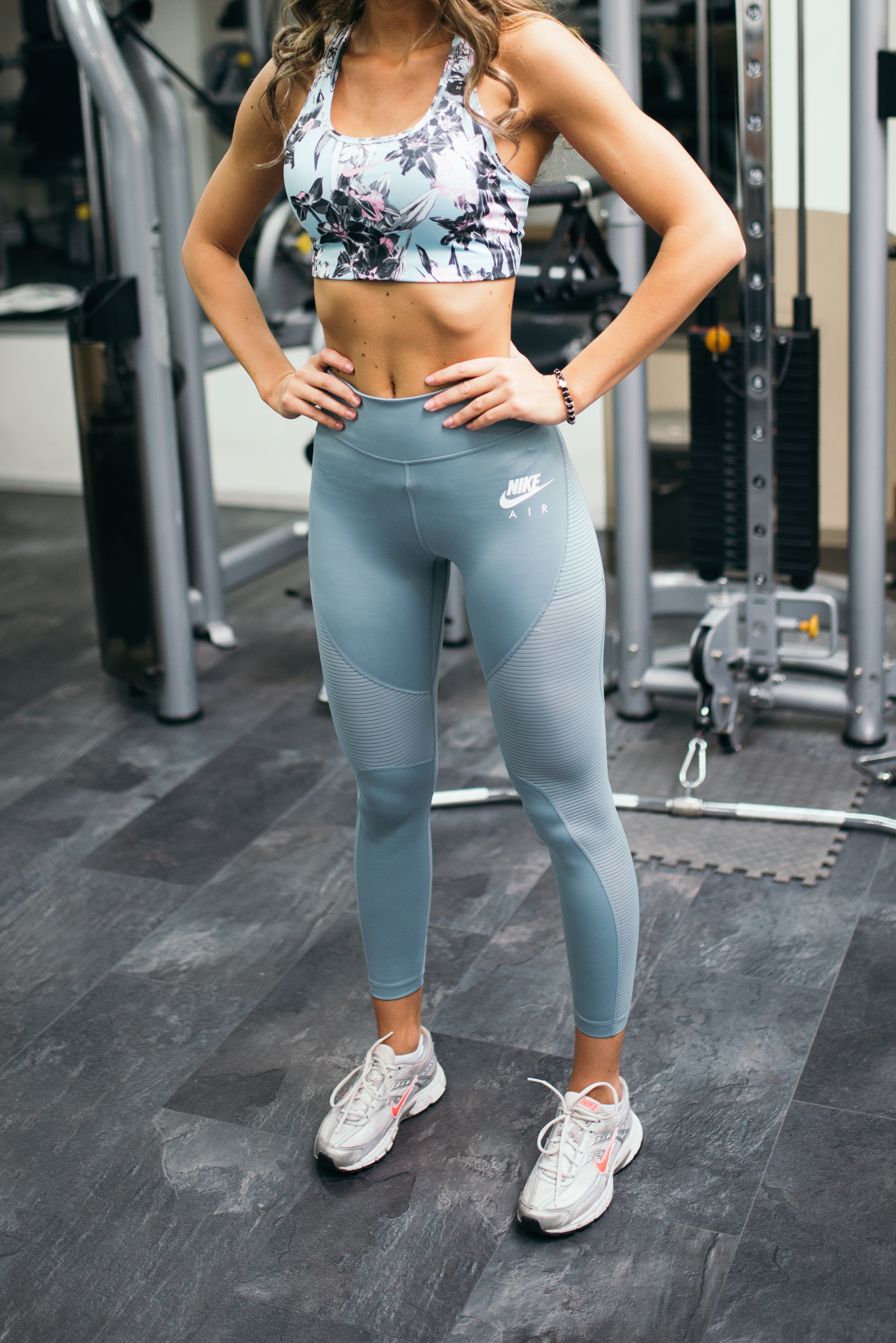
Yoga pants as gym wear

In schools of the U.S., the wider adoption of yoga pants as casual wear proved controversial. Some schools adopted dress codes banning yoga pants for all students, or banning them only for female students or ordering them to be covered by sweatpants. Bitch magazine argued such bans are largely gendered, focusing on the damage caused by supposed "distraction" of boys by girls in tight clothing; similar complaints caused a ban in Rockport, Massachusetts, that was quickly reversed. In Montana, a 2015 bill supposedly sought to outlaw both yoga pants and leggings, but the representative concerned, David Moore, claimed that this had been a joke.

The tight-fitting nature of yoga pants for adult women has also stirred up discussion. In The Atlantic in 2014, Rosalie Murphy criticized the glossy yoga magazines such as Yoga Journal which always featured a female yoga practitioner in tight yoga pants and tank top, "stretching her arms toward the sky or closing her eyes in meditation". Time magazine recorded that in 2016, a man in Rhode Island wrote to a local newspaper calling the wearing of yoga pants by women "bizarre and disturbing"; in response, hundreds of demonstrators in tight clothing assembled in front of his house. In 2017, a pair of Lululemon "Boogie" yoga pants was put on display in the Museum of Modern Art's "Items: Is Fashion Modern?" exhibition.

In an opinion piece in The New York Times, Honor Jones argued that yoga pants were bad for women, stating that women were wearing yoga pants because of social pressure to be "sexy", and urged women to wear shape-concealing sweatpants instead. Anne Kingston disagreed with Jones, writing in Maclean's in 2018 that a looser style of sweatpants had already re-entered athleisure fashion, and that there were solid practical reasons for tight yoga pants, such as that they make it easier for instructors and students to check their body alignment, reducing the risk of injury.

== See also ==
- Leggings
- Yoga brick
- Yoga in the United States
- Yoga mat
