= Christine M. Day =

Canadian retail executive

Christine M. Day (born 1962) is a Canadian retail executive. She was the CEO of the Vancouver-based food company Luvo Inc. since January 2014. From 2008 through December 2013, she was the CEO of the Canadian clothing company Lululemon Athletica. Prior to taking her post at Lululemon she worked for Starbucks' Asia-Pacific division.

== Early life and education ==
Day was born in Northern Ireland. When her father's career as a professional soccer player was ended by a knee injury, the family immigrated to Canada and settled in British Columbia where he worked as an engineer. In 1984, she received her undergraduate degree from Central Washington University.

== Career ==
After graduating from college, Day worked for private-equity corporation, Integrated Resources, where she learned about investment. Later, Day worked for a financial services firm. One of its clients was Howard Schultz, who owned the Il Giornale coffee outlet and was looking to expand the company by purchasing Starbucks. In 1986, Day began working for Schultz's company and remained with Starbucks for the next 20 years. In 2002, she attended Harvard Business School's six-week advanced management program. In 2003, she became the head of Starbucks' Asia-Pacific division.

Day became CEO of Lululemon Athletica in January 2008. In 2011, she became the first woman to be named "CEO of the Year" by The Globe and Mail and was named "Marketer of the Year" by the Canadian Marketing Association. In June 2013, Day announced that she would be resigning as CEO of the company. Laurent Potdevin was later named as the company's new CEO.

Day became the new CEO of Luvo Inc., a startup food and catering company that sells healthy frozen foods. It is based in Vancouver with most of its operations in Atlanta, Georgia. She owns 15% of Luvo and is the company's second largest shareholder, after its founder Steve Sidwell. Day has said that she was drawn to Luvo's company mission, and believed it had an opportunity for marketplace disruption.

Day is currently a partner in the Vancouver-based venture capital firm Campfire Capital.

== Personal life ==
Day is married with two sons and a daughter. Her husband Pat held a senior post at Boeing for twenty years but retired from the company after the birth of their youngest child.
