= California Route 66 Museum =

Museum in Victorville, California

Coordinates: 34°32′14″N 117°17′39″W

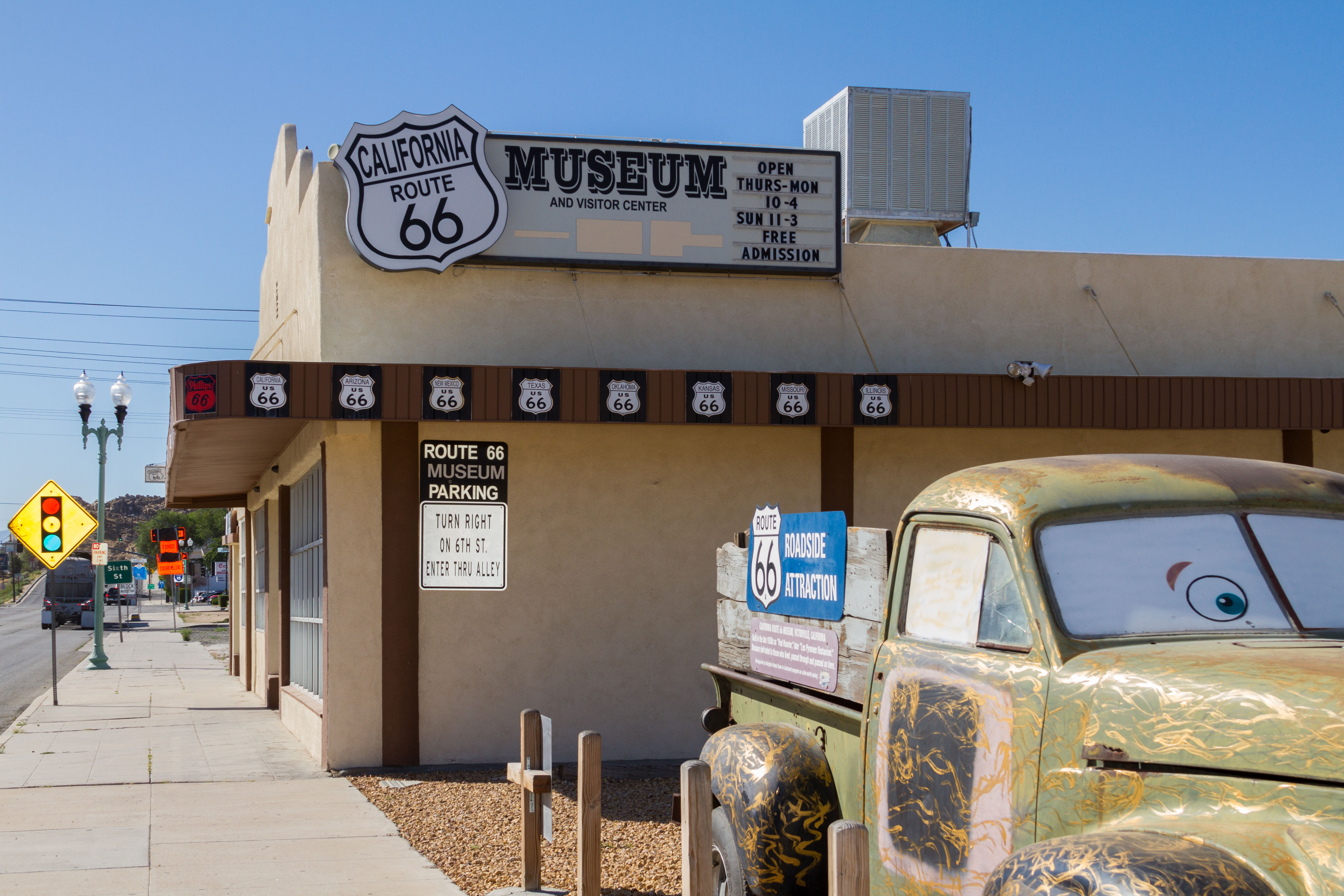
The California Route 66 Museum is located at 16825 South D Street in the city of Victorville, California. The California Route 66 Museum is devoted to the representation of U.S. Highway 66 in both historic and contemporary exhibition.

The California Route 66 Museum is located on Historic U.S. Route 66 in Old Town Victorville, in the Mojave Desert within San Bernardino County, California.

Constantly changing exhibitions follow the development of U.S. Route 66 from the time of early pioneer trails and railroads. Historic photographs and artifacts explore the impact of the highway upon the local economy and culture.

Three display rooms and a gift shop are housed in the 5,000-square-foot (460 m^{2}) former Red Rooster Cafe.

== History ==
The museum was founded by Old Town Victorville Heritage Preservation, Inc. It opened its doors on November 11, 1995. It is supported by contributions from volunteers, donors and patrons.

== Filming location ==
The museum's building, when it was still operating as the Red Rooster Cafe, was the location for the Neil Diamond film The Jazz Singer.

== See also ==
- List of Route 66 museums
- U.S. Route 66 in California
