= Trans Am Rapture =

Sculpture in Vancouver, Canada

- Trans Am Totem
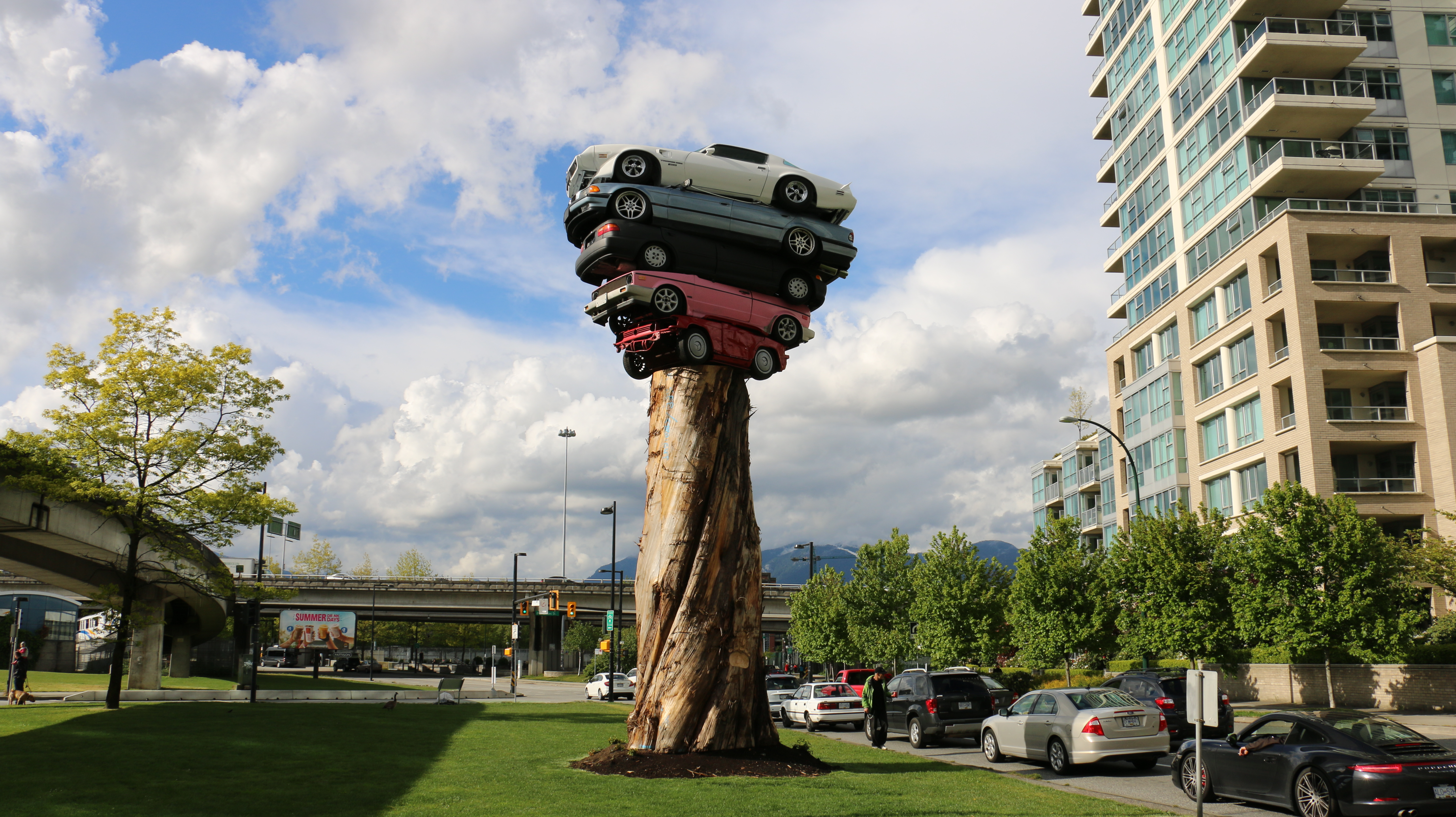
- The sculpture, looking north (2015)
- Artist: Marcus Bowcott
- Year: 2015
- Type: Sculpture
- Location: Vancouver, British Columbia, Canada; 49°16′33.98″N 123°6′6.53″W

Trans Am Rapture (originally titled Trans Am Totem) was a public art installation in Vancouver, British Columbia, Canada, created by sculptor Marcus Bowcott. Part of the Vancouver Biennale, the piece was unveiled in April 2015. Located at the intersection of Quebec Street and Milross Avenue, near False Creek, east of Vancouver's Downtown area, the sculpture incorporated stacked cars on top of a base made from a tree trunk. It stood 10 metres (33 ft) high and weighed 11,340 kilograms (25,000 lb). It was dismantled on August 15, 2021, and a new location is still being considered as of 2025.

== Background ==
Bowcott's fascination with crumbling cars started when working on tow boats on the Fraser River in the 1980s. Farmers used cars as breakwaters to stop the river banks from eroding, leaving the cars in various states of ruin. Bowcott attempted to record his impressions of the decayed vehicles in paintings, but was dissatisfied with the results. After teaching at Capilano University for 22 years, Bowcott started working on the Trans Am Totem project for the 2014–2016 Vancouver Biennale.

Construction of the stack of automobiles took two years, with the assistance of Bowcott's partner Helene Aspinall and structural engineer Eric Karsh. The Vancouver Biennale supplied 10,000 CAD of the construction and installation costs; the remainder were put up by the artist. After installing the sculpture, Bowcott launched a crowdfunding campaign that recouped 6,500 CAD of the installation costs. Bowcott has stated that the piece is a "sculptural response" to the urban site. It is as much a "celebration" of our mobility and technology as it is a critique of "throwaway consumer culture".

The sculpture is currently not installed; an attempt to relocate it to the south end of the Granville Street Bridge was abandoned after local residents protested. The City of Vancouver is looking for a new site for the artwork.

== Materials ==
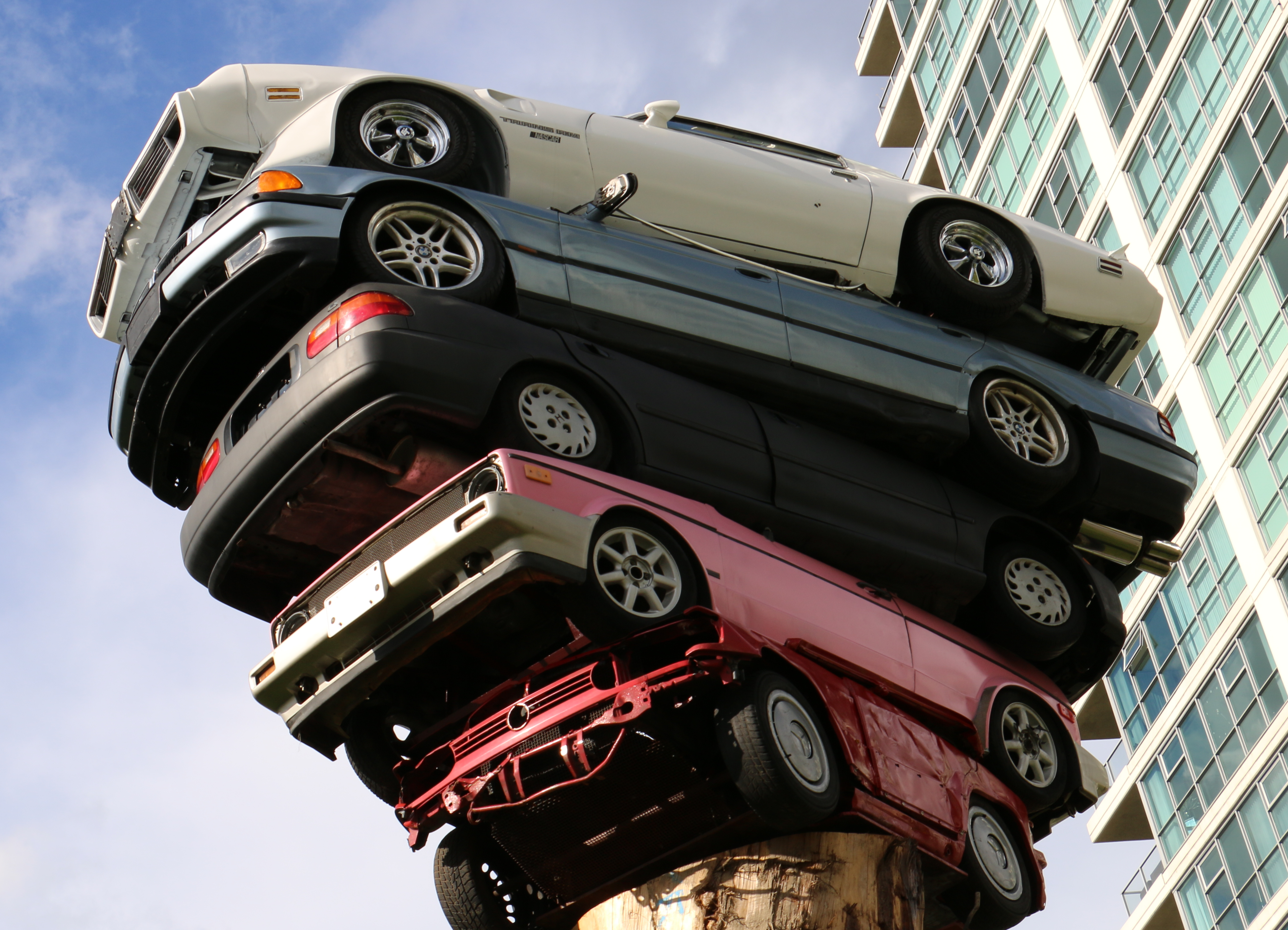
Detail of the vehicle stack

The sculpture incorporates five vehicles atop a wood base, made from a single tree. The vehicles are (from top to bottom) a Pontiac Trans Am, a BMW 7 Series (E38), a fifth generation Honda Civic sedan, a Volkswagen Golf Mk1 Cabriolet, and a shortened Mercedes-Benz W201 with the front grille of a Volkswagen Golf Mk3. The vehicles, donated by a local scrapyard, had their engines, transmissions and drivetrains removed to reduce their weight. A solar-powered electrical system was installed to power the vehicles' headlights and taillights. The cars are fixed to a steel column which rises through the centre of the sculpture. Bowcott also repainted the vehicles. The wooden base which supports the cars is from the stump of an old-growth cedar tree, which was transported from southern Vancouver Island. The tree was separated into halves along its length to incorporate the central steel column.

== See also ==
- 2015 in art
- Carhenge
- Spindle (sculpture), Berwyn, Illinois
