= List of Route 66 museums =

A Route 66 museum is a museum devoted primarily to the history of U.S. Route 66, a U.S. Highway which served the states of California, Arizona, New Mexico, Texas, Oklahoma, Kansas, Missouri, and Illinois, in the United States from 1926 until it was bypassed by the Interstate highway system and ultimately decommissioned in June 1985.

In many towns and US states on the former highway, the initial efforts to establish museums to preserve the road's history were led by individual state-level Route 66 associations or local groups.

As each museum is an independent entity, their content varies widely; some cover one state or region, while others cover the entire eight-state route, and many extend to related topics varying from the pre-highway transportation history of a state to the Dust Bowl exodus of the Great Depression, the mobilization of soldiers and equipment for World War II or nostalgia for the post-war highway and classic cars of that era.

== Arizona Route 66 Museum ==
The Arizona Route 66 Museum opened in Kingman, Arizona on September 29, 2001 during Andy Devine Days. The museum, located in the Powerhouse Visitor Center, formerly the Desert Power & Water Co. Electric Power Plant, depicts the historical evolution of travel along the 35th parallel that became Route 66.

== Berwyn Route 66 Museum ==
The Berwyn Route 66 Museum, which moved to a retail storefront in Berwyn, Illinois in 2011 from a now-defunct Ford dealership, was home to the Berwyn Arts Council gallery and as of 2012 is attempting to rebuild Berwyn's Spindle sculpture, dismantled in 2008.

== California Route 66 Museum ==
The California Route 66 Museum, established in 1995 at the former Red Rooster Café building in Victorville, is one of two museums in the state devoted to the history of Route 66 (California also has a Mother Road museum in Barstow). This museum focuses on the westernmost portion of the historic highway.

== Chandler Route 66 Interpretive Center ==
One of three Route 66 museums in Oklahoma (others exist in Clinton and Elk City), the Chandler Route 66 Interpretive Center occupies the historic Chandler Armory (1935–1971), originally built by the Depression-era Works Progress Administration.

== Route 66 Association of Illinois Hall of Fame and Museum ==
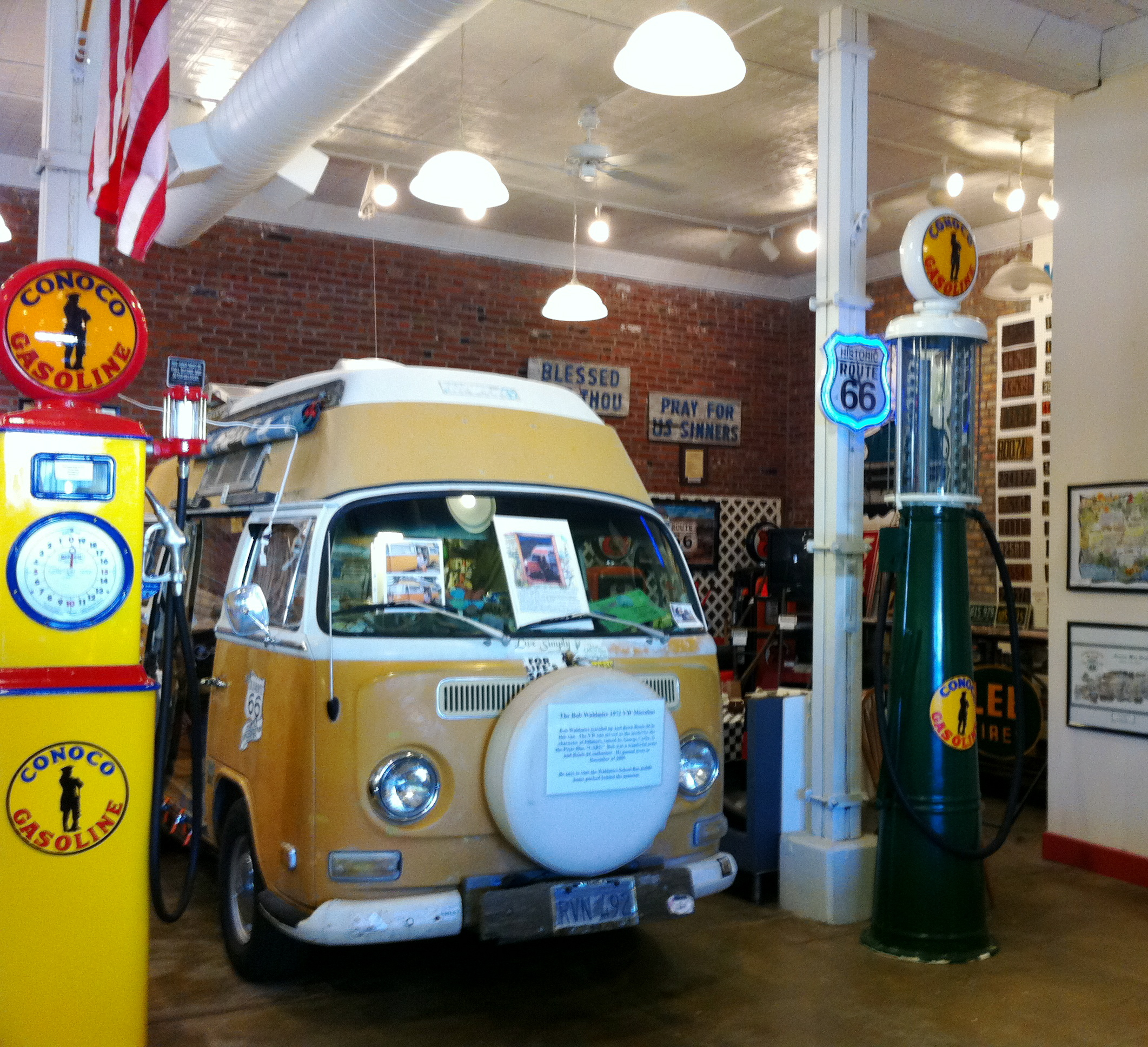
Waldmire's VW microbus in Route 66 Hall of Fame, Illinois.

The Route 66 Association of Illinois Hall of Fame and Museum in Pontiac, Illinois was originally established by the Illinois Route 66 association at the Dixie Truckers Home on the former US Route 66 (now Interstate 55 in Illinois), relocated in June 2004 to early-1900s fire hall, and is now located in the former Pontiac City Hall and Fire Station, now known as the Pontiac Museum Complex.

Its collections include the vehicles of late Route 66 travelling artist and cartographer Bob Waldmire, on whom the Cars character "Fillmore" is based.

== Litchfield Museum ==
The former "Vic Suhling Gas for Less" filling station site at 334 Historic Old Route 66 North in Litchfield, Illinois was redeveloped and opened in 2013 as the Litchfield Museum and Route 66 Welcome Center. Local history displays include “The Indian Connection,” “Railroad History,” “Historic Downtown Businesses,” “Agriculture and Farming,” and “Illinois Route 66” complete with a mural by late Route 66 artist Bob Waldmire which was relocated from the Dixie Truckers Home.

A 2013 matching grant from the Route 66 Corridor Preservation Program will fund restoration of the historic filling station signage.

== National Route 66 Museum ==
The National Route 66 Museum forms part of an Old Town Museum Complex in Elk City, Oklahoma, which includes several museums on various topics. This museum covers the entire eight-state route, incorporating an interactive ride in a 1959 Cadillac.

== New Mexico Route 66 Museum ==
The New Mexico Route 66 Museum is located in Tucumcari, New Mexico behind the local convention center.

A competing proposal from another group advocated a Route 66 museum be established in the historic Ilfeld Warehouse near downtown Santa Rosa, New Mexico.

== Oklahoma Route 66 Museum ==
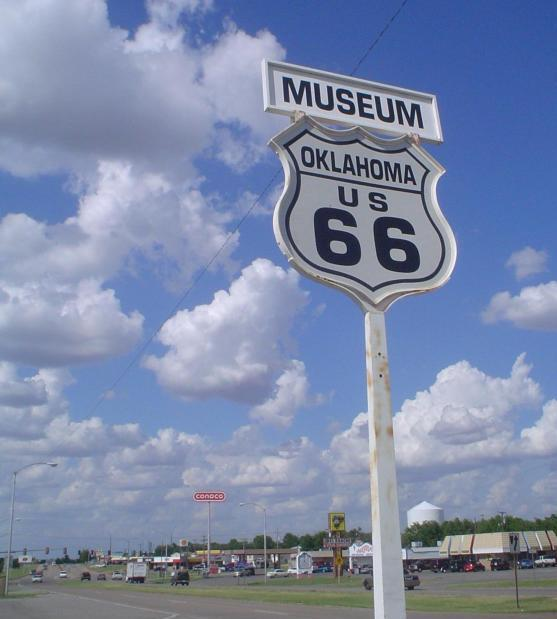
Route 66 in Clinton, Oklahoma.

The Oklahoma Route 66 Museum in Clinton, Oklahoma, covers the history of Route 66 from Chicago, Illinois to Santa, Monica, California. It is the largest museum dedicated to the history and culture of Route 66, the most famous highway in the World. The museum also offers changing special exhibits, focusing on the Route 66 experience in the Now and Future Gallery. And don't forget to step into the gift shop for some Route 66 Memorabilia.

== Route 66 Mother Road Museum ==
One of two museums located in the historic 1911 Casa del Desierto, a former Harvey House Railroad Depot and hotel in Barstow, California, the Barstow Route 66 "Mother Road" Museum opened in 2000. It displays historic vehicles, photographs, artwork and petroliana from Route 66's heyday.

== Route 66 State Park Visitors Center ==
The Visitors Center in Missouri's Route 66 State Park is located in the Bridgehead Inn, a roadhouse constructed in 1928. The Center has permanent displays on Route 66, focusing on Missouri. They also sell books on Route 66 as well as souvenirs. The Visitors Center is next to an historic Route 66 bridge over the Meramec River. The Route 66 State Park itself is on the other side of the bridge, on the former site of the now-ghost town of Times Beach, Missouri.

== See also ==
- List of museums
