= Dustin Shuler =

American sculptor (1948–2010)

- Dustin Shuler and his dog Blitz
- Died: May 4, 2010 (aged 61)
- Education: Carnegie Institute of Technology
- Known for: Sculpture, Public art
- Notable work: Spindle
- Spouse: Karen Zindler
- Website: dustinshuler.com

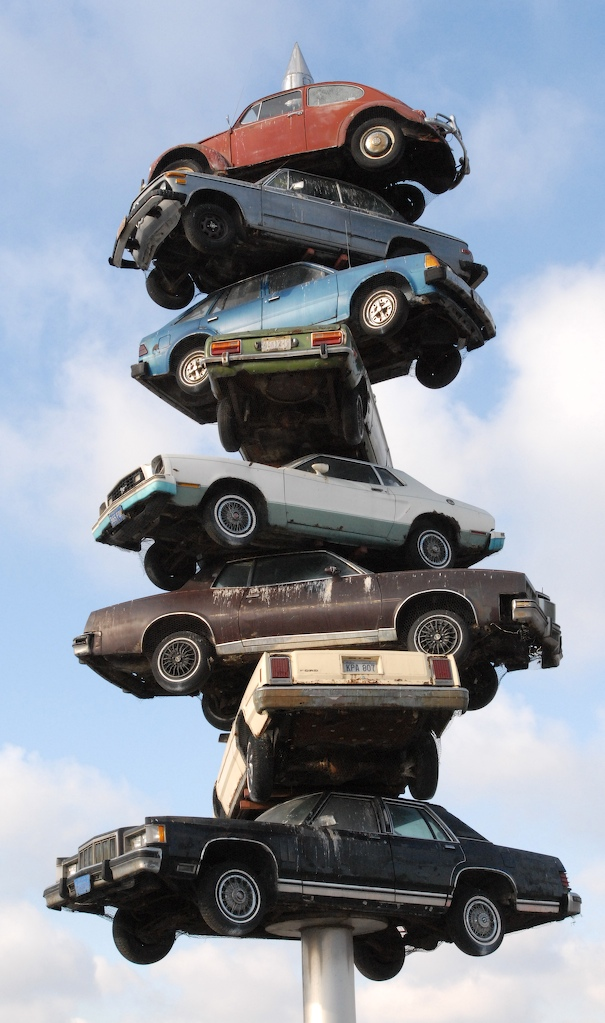
Spindle (1989) by Dustin Shuler

Dustin Shuler (August 17, 1948 – May 4, 2010) was an American pop art sculptor and mixed-media artist, best known for a 1989 piece called Spindle, a 50-foot steel spike with eight cars impaled on it that became emblematic of the city of Berwyn, Illinois, where it was installed for two decades in the parking lot of a popular shopping mall. Most of Shuler's major works consisted of outdoor art installations, and the majority of his sculptures used elements of consumer-goods detritus.

== Early life ==
Shuler was born in Wilkinsburg, Pennsylvania, on August 17, 1948. He worked at the Westinghouse Electric Corp factory during the day while taking night classes in art at Carnegie Institute of Technology, now known as Carnegie Mellon University. Shuler left Westinghouse in 1971 to devote more time to his art career. In 1973 at the age of 25, he moved to southern California, where he worked for a while as a welder in an aircraft engine factory before becoming an artist full-time. In 1979, he married Karen Zindler.

== Career and works ==
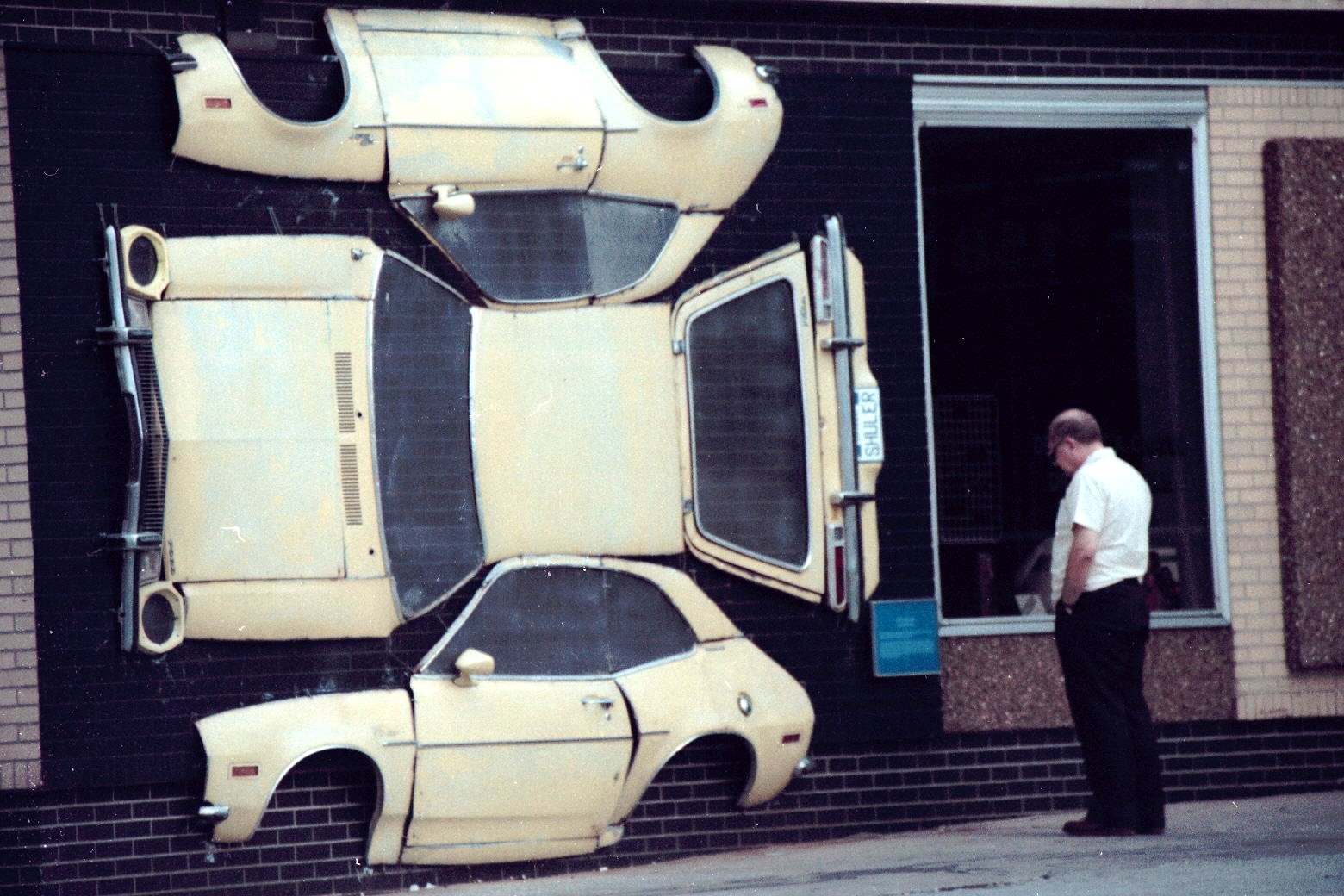
Pinto Pelt (1988) by Dustin Shuler

Shuler's fascination with using car bodies in large artworks began in Santa Ana in 1978 with the installation Tutankhamun Disguised as a Volkswagen Bus, which featured a 20-foot-long steel nail dubbed Tutankhamun skewered lengthwise through a derelict VW bus. This was followed by the 1980 performance piece Death of an Era at California State University, Dominguez Hills, CA, during which another 20-foot-long steel nail was hoisted 100 feet into the air by crane and dropped to impale a 1959 Cadillac, after which the impaled vehicle with nail was propped on its side for display.

Shuler unveiled "Pinned Butterfly" in 1982, a temporary installation in which he pinned a multicolor-sky-painted, star-spangled Cessna 150 to the side of the four-story American Hotel in Los Angeles using a giant steel nail. He followed up in 1983 by taking a new direction with disused automobiles by creating Car Pelts, which he made by gutting the car bodies, removing the chassis and interior, then slitting the exterior shells at strategic points and flattening them to create 'skins' that resembled rugs made from animal pelts. These were typically hung vertically in a number of different arrangements. One such work, Pinto Pelt, preceded Spindle by a few years at the Cermak Plaza shopping mall in Berwyn. Like Spindle, Pinto Pelt had been commissioned by shopping mall developer and modern art collector David Bermant, whose company had developed the Cermak Plaza mall, where Bermant had also exhibited other examples of outdoor Pop Art. After that, Shuler continued his Car Pelt series using the flattened bodies of scaled-down car models and toy cars before moving on to his Shipwrecks series and Shootings series.

The most unusual of Shuler's works is probably the 2005 installation known as The Rainforest: A Landscape in the Shower, which was exhibited in 2006 at Los Angeles Contemporary Exhibitions in Hollywood, California. The mixed-media work consisted of a living, recreated segment of a rainforest environment, planted inside a fiberglass shower stall and sealed in front by a sheet of clear heavy Plexiglas with nutrients and support equipment stacked in black steel racks on either side of the stall. More recently, Shuler created the whimsical installation "Dance" in 2008 in Sarasota, Florida, in which twelve cars were placed in a circle, in pairs with their front ends tilted upward towards the sky. The cars are held in place by galvanized steel cables.

Other places where Shuler's works have been installed include the Ulrich Museum of Art at Wichita State University (as part of the permanent collection); the De Saisset Museum at Santa Clara University, Santa Clara, California (also as part of the permanent collection); the Department of Motor Vehicles of the State of California in San Jose; and at the San Francisco Parking Authority in San Francisco.

== Death ==
Dustin Shuler died of pancreatic cancer at his home in Inglewood, California, on May 4, 2010, at the age of 61. He was survived by his wife, Karen Zindler-Shuler; a brother, Terry; and a sister, Lynn Seng.
