= Carhenge =

Sculpture in Nebraska made from motor cars

Coordinates: 42.142293°N 102.857987°W

Carhenge is a replica of England's Stonehenge located near the city of Alliance, Nebraska, in the High Plains region of the United States. Instead of being built with large standing stones, as is the case with the original Stonehenge, Carhenge is formed from vintage American automobiles, all covered with gray spray paint. Built by Jim Reinders, it was dedicated at the June 1987 summer solstice. In 2006, a visitor center was constructed to serve the site. Carhenge was featured in Pixar's Cars franchise spinoff webseries Cars on the Road.

== Structure ==
Carhenge and Stonehenge

Carhenge consists of 39 automobiles arranged in a circle measuring about 96 feet (29 m) in diameter. Some are held upright in pits 5 feet (1.5 m) deep, trunk end down, and arches have been formed by welding automobiles atop the supporting models. The heelstone is a 1962 Cadillac. Three cars were buried at Carhenge with a sign stating: "Here lie three bones of foreign cars. They served our purpose while Detroit slept. Now Detroit is awake and America's great!"

Carhenge replicates Stonehenge's current dilapidated state, rather than the original stone circle erected between 2500 BC and 2000 BC.

In addition to the Stonehenge replica, the Carhenge site includes several other artworks created from autos covered with various colors of spray paint.

=== Cars ===
This table lists cars in Carhenge starting from the west entrance and proceeding left, or clockwise, around the outer ring of cars which represent the sarsen megalith circle of Stonehenge. The inner horseshoe of trilithons are also listed clockwise.

Car	Stonehenge equivalent stone
1965 Oldsmobile Delta 88	Sarsen circle, standing
1974 Chevrolet Vega	Sarsen circle, lintel
1967 Pontiac Catalina	Sarsen circle, standing
Unknown Ford or Mercury	Sarsen circle, standing
1967 Pontiac Bonneville	Sarsen circle, standing
1972 Chevy Impala	Sarsen circle, standing
1975 AMC Gremlin	Sarsen circle, lintel
1986 Ford	Sarsen circle, standing
1965 Chevy Impala	Sarsen circle, standing
1951 Willys Jeep Pickup	Sarsen circle, lintel
1969 Buick Skylark	Sarsen circle, standing
1962 Plymouth Valiant	Sarsen circle, lintel
1966 Oldsmobile Delta 88	Sarsen circle, standing
1959 Pontiac Star Chief	Sarsen circle, standing
1964 Mercury Marauder	Sarsen circle, standing
1965 Chevy Chevelle	Sarsen circle, lintel
1964 Oldsmobile Super 88	Sarsen circle, standing
1965 Ford or Mercury	Sarsen circle, standing
1965 Ford Fairlane 500 Skyliner	Sarsen circle, lintel
1966 Oldsmobile Delta 88	Sarsen circle, standing
1964 Cadillac	Sarsen circle, standing
1965 Ford Galaxie	Sarsen circle, standing
1960 Ford Galaxie	Sarsen circle, fallen
1968 Chevy Impala Station Wagon	Trilithon, standing
1957 Plymouth	Trilithon, lintel
1968 Ford Station Wagon	Trilithon, standing
1975 Ford Country Squire	Trilithon, standing
1950 DeSoto	Trilithon, lintel
1965 Buick Estate Station Wagon	Trilithon, standing
1967 Cadillac DeVille Ambulance	Trilithon, standing
1961 Cadillac Deville	Altar Stone
1967 Ford Woody	Trilithon, standing
1954-56? Cadillac	Trilithon, lintel
1969 Ford or Mercury Station Wagon	Trilithon, standing

== History ==
Carhenge was conceived in 1982 by Jim Reinders as a memorial to his father, who once lived on the farm now containing Carhenge. While living in England, he studied the structure of Stonehenge, which helped him to copy the structure's shape, proportions, and size. It was built in 1987 by Reinders and around a crew of around 35 family members, and dedicated at the Summer Solstice. Other automobile sculptures were subsequently added to the location of Carhenge, which is now known as the Car Art Reserve. In 1992, Reinders removed a Toyota car from Carhenge, saying "We wanted it to be an American Carhenge, not a Japanese Carhenge".

Reinders donated the 10-acre site to the Friends of Carhenge. In 2011, the Friends of Carhenge listed the attraction for sale for $300,000. In 2013, the Friends of Carhenge donated the site to the Citizens of Alliance.

Carhenge has appeared in film, popular music, television programs and commercials. For example: Film - Omaha, The Movie (1995); Popular music - Steely Dan (album cover, Remastered, The Best of Steely Dan, 1993); P.O.D. (music video, "Youth of the Nation", 2002); Television - Biker Build-Off; Where in the World Is Carmen Sandiego? (episode: "The Great Train Slobbery"); Commercials - Nissan Pathfinder (2006), Nebraska Cornhuskers football (2007). It is the subject of the 2005 documentary Carhenge: Genius or Junk? and features in the 2007 travel book 1,000 Places to See in the USA and Canada Before You Die.

The path of totality of the solar eclipse of August 21, 2017 included Carhenge. An estimated 4,000 people, including Nebraska governor Pete Ricketts, viewed the eclipse from the site. Reinders stated that, at the time of Carhenge's creation, he had not known about the eclipse that would occur 30 years later.

== See also ==
- Cadillac Ranch
- Spindle (sculpture)
- Stonehenge replicas and derivatives
