= Spindle (sculpture) =

Demolished sculpture in Illinois by Dustin Shuler

- Artist: Dustin Shuler
- Year: 1989
- Type: Assemblage
- Dimensions: 15 m (50 ft)
- Condition: demolished in 2008
- Location: Cermak Plaza, Berwyn, Illinois; 41°50′59″N 87°48′05″W

Spindle was a sculpture created in 1989 by artist Dustin Shuler (1948–2010). It consisted of a 50-foot spike with eight cars impaled on it in a manner reminiscent of documents on a desk spindle.

== History ==
From 1989, until its demolition on May 2, 2008, it was located in the car park of Cermak Plaza shopping center, at the corner of Cermak Road and Harlem Avenue (Illinois Route 43) in Berwyn, Illinois.

It was originally commissioned by the shopping center developer and owner, David Bermant, a collector of modern art who also donated his BMW car to be placed second from the top of the sculpture. Shuler himself owned the red 1967 VW Beetle that crowned the sculpture. The foundation of the sculpture reached nearly 30 feet into the ground; the cost of erecting it was over $75,000.

The impaled cars on the spindle, from top to bottom, were:

1. 1967 Volkswagen Beetle, red
2. 1976 BMW 2002, silver blue; license plate "DAVE"
3. 1981 Ford Escort, blue
4. 1973 Capri, green
5. 1978 Ford Mustang II, white over blue
6. 1981 Pontiac Grand Prix, maroon or burgundy
7. 1980 or 1979 Ford LTD, light yellow
8. 1981 or 1979 Mercury Grand Marquis, black

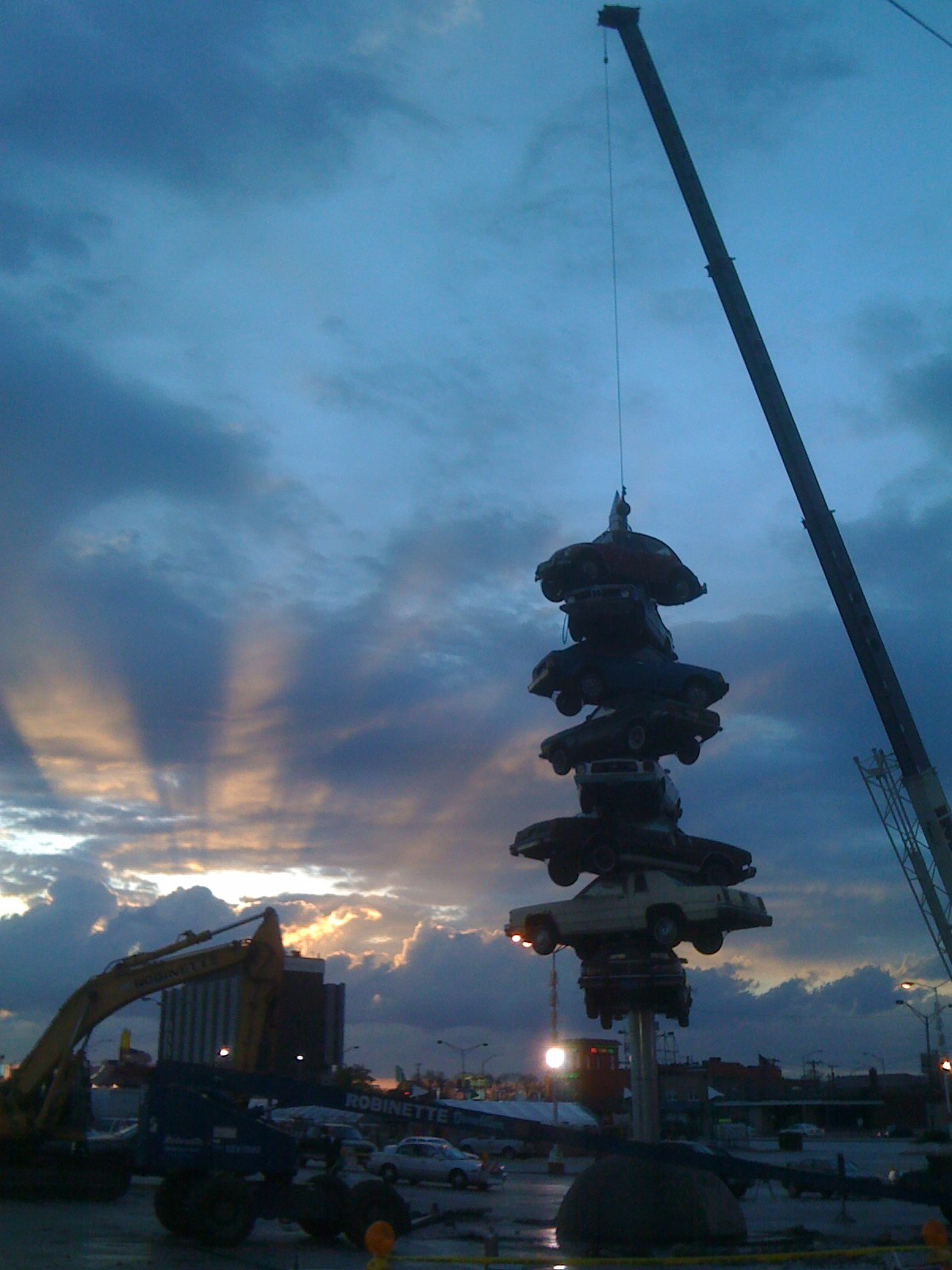
Spindle being disassembled on May 2, 2008.

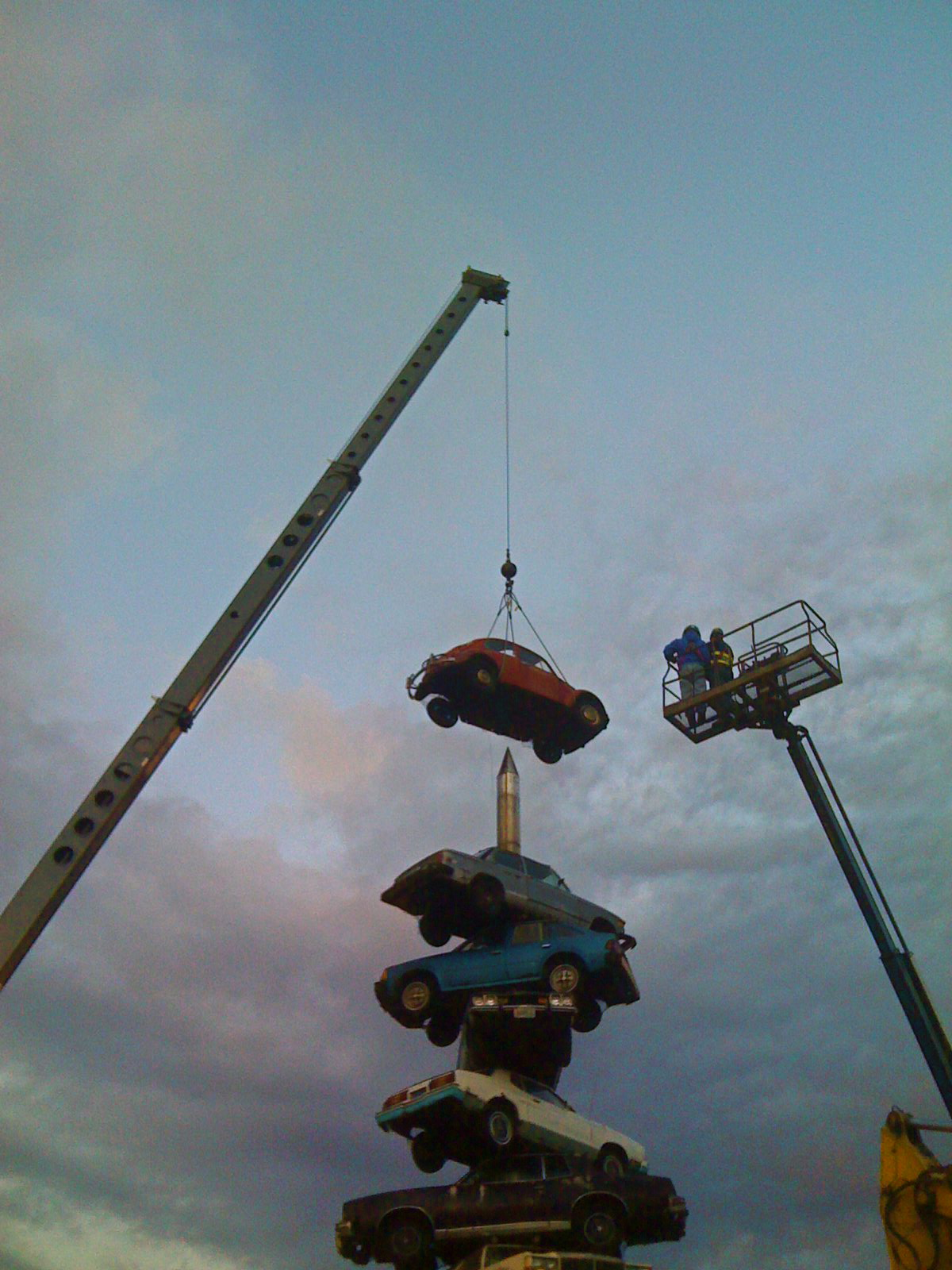
Spindle being disassembled on May 2, 2008.

Although the Pop Art installation was emblematic of Berwyn for two decades, it was not universally loved in its hometown. The presentation of the plans for its erection drew debate in the city council, although no permit was needed for artwork erected on private property. Throughout its existence, the sculpture was controversial amongst Berwyn residents, and in 1990 they voted overwhelmingly for it to be removed. However, the mayor of Berwyn described the sculpture as "icon in our community", and Bermant claimed that the shopping center received 30% more business than comparable shopping centers due to the quirky art around the center. When Bermant died in 2000, the artwork lost one of its major defenders and the shopping center changed hands. That set the stage for the sculpture's eventual removal.

In July 2007, it was announced that the shopping center was to be partially redeveloped and that the site of the sculpture was earmarked for a new Walgreens store. Cermak Plaza already had a Walgreens but it lacked a drive-thru window, which the new structure would include. There was debate as to whether the sculpture should be relocated or simply removed due to the high cost of relocation (estimated at over $350,000). The uncertain future of the sculpture again sparked disagreement between residents who viewed it as a Berwyn landmark and those who viewed it as an eyesore.

On July 27, 2007, Chicago Critical Mass participants rode to Spindle in an effort to raise awareness of the sculpture. About 2,000 cyclists made the 14.8 mile trek from Daley Plaza in The Loop in support of the artwork.

On August 1, 2007, radio station WLUP interviewed the Berwyn mayor; the main topic of discussion was Spindle. He stated that the sculpture's removal had been pushed to September 2007, and that it would most likely be moved down the street. The sculpture was even made available for purchase in an eBay auction, which ended April 17, 2008 with no bids.

On May 2, 2008, Robinette Demolition disassembled Spindle. A large crowd stood near the site, taking pictures. The top two cars were removed from the spike by a crane, and stored for future use. The base of the spindle was then cut, and the spindle (along with the remaining cars) was pushed over with a crane and later removed.

A model of this sculpture can be seen at Stratford Square Mall in Bloomingdale by the entrance to the men's restroom in the former Sears wing.

== Possible return ==
There are plans to recreate Spindle, featuring the original top two cars, if sufficient funds can be raised. A group backed by the Berwyn Route 66 Museum and Berwyn Arts Council took possession of the previous top two cars in 2012, along with a pole from a former Anderson Ford sign, with the intention of rebuilding a slightly shortened Spindle in the museum's parking lot.

== In popular culture ==
The sculpture was featured in the 1992 film Wayne's World, on the cover of a book, on postcards, state tourist brochures, and maps. On August 28, 2007, it was featured in the syndicated comic strip Zippy the Pinhead.

== See also ==
- Cadillac Ranch
- Carhenge
- Trans Am Totem
