= 1972 Illinois elections =

- November 7, 1972
- Turnout: 78.52%

Elections were held in Illinois on Tuesday, November 7, 1972.

Primaries were held on March 21, 1972.

== Election information ==
=== Turnout ===
Turnout in the primary election was 39.90%, with a total of 2,228,605 ballots cast. 1,563,193 Democratic and 665,412 Republican primary ballots were cast.

Turnout during the general election was 78.52%, with 4,880,213 ballots cast.

== Federal elections ==
=== United States President ===
Illinois voted for the Republican ticket of Richard Nixon and Spiro Agnew.

=== United States Senate ===
Incumbent Charles H. Percy, a Republican, won reelection.

=== United States House ===
All 24 Illinois seats in the United States House of Representatives were up for election in 1972. Seats had seen redistricting due to the results of the 1970 United States census. Illinois did not lose any congressional seats during reapportionment. As of 2020, this is the last time that Illinois has not lost any congressional districts during a post-census reapportionment.

Before the election, both the Democratic and Republican parties held 12 seats from Illinois. In 1972, Republicans won 14 seats, while Democrats won 10 seats.

== State elections ==
=== Governor and Lieutenant Governor ===
1972 Illinois gubernatorial election
- November 7, 1972
- Turnout: 75.28%
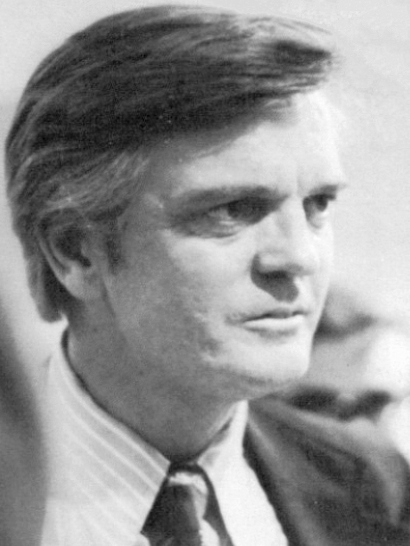

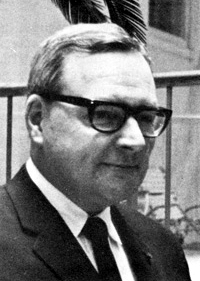
| Nominee | Dan Walker | Richard B. Ogilvie |
| Party | Democratic | Republican |
| Running mate | Neil Hartigan | James D. Nowlan |
| Popular vote | 2,371,303 | 2,293,809 |
| Percentage | 50.7% | 49.0% |
- County Results; Walker: 40–50% 50–60% 60–70% Ogilvie: 50–60% 60–70%
Governor before election
Richard B. Ogilvie
Republican
Elected Governor
Dan Walker
Democratic

Incumbent Republican Richard B. Ogilvie lost to Democrat Dan Walker.

Incumbent Lieutenant Governor Paul Simon did not seek reelection to a second term, instead opting to (ultimately unsuccessfully) seek the Democratic nomination for governor. Democrat Neil Hartigan was elected to succeed him.

This was the first gubernatorial elections in which gubernatorial and lieutenant gubernatorial candidates were elected on a ticket in the general election, per the 1970 Constitution of Illinois.

1972 gubernatorial election, Illinois
| Party | Candidate | Votes | % |
|---|---|---|---|
| Democratic | Daniel Walker/Neil F. Hartigan | 2,371,303 | 50.68 |
| Republican | Richard B. Ogilvie (incumbent)/James D. Nowlan | 2,293,809 | 49.02 |
| Socialist Labor | George LaForest/Stanley L. Prorok | 7,966 | 0.17 |
| Communist | Ishmael Flory/Theodore Pearson | 4,592 | 0.10 |
| Write-in | Others | 1,373 | 0.03 |
| Total votes | | 4,679,043 | |

=== Attorney General ===
1972 Illinois Attorney General election
- November 7, 1972
- Turnout: 72.87%
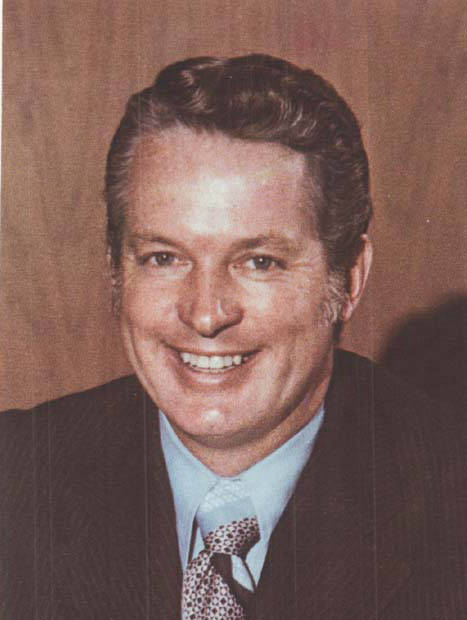

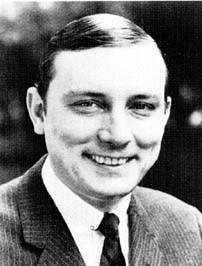
| Nominee | William J. Scott | Thomas G. Lyons |
| Party | Republican | Democratic |
| Popular vote | 2,898,198 | 1,613,103 |
| Percentage | 63.99% | 35.62% |
- County results Scott: 50–60% 60–70% 70–80% 80–90% Lyons: 50–60%
Attorney General before election
William J. Scott
Republican
Elected Attorney General
William J. Scott
Republican

Incumbent Attorney General William J. Scott, a Republican, was elected to a second term.

==== Democratic primary ====
Illinois State Senator Thomas G. Lyons won the Democratic primary, running unopposed.

Attorney General Democratic primary
| Party | Candidate | Votes | % |
|---|---|---|---|
| Democratic | Thomas G. Lyons | 954,194 | 100 |
| Write-in | Others | 33 | 0.00 |
| Total votes | | 954,227 | 100 |

==== Republican primary ====
Incumbent William J. Scott won the Republican primary, running unopposed.

Attorney General Republican primary
| Party | Candidate | Votes | % |
|---|---|---|---|
| Republican | William J. Scott (incumbent) | 546,308 | 100 |
| Write-in | Others | 7 | 0.00 |
| Total votes | | 546,315 | 100 |

==== General election ====
Attorney General election
| Party | Candidate | Votes | % |
|---|---|---|---|
| Republican | William J. Scott (incumbent) | 2,898,198 | 63.99 |
| Democratic | Thomas G. Lyons | 1,613,103 | 35.62 |
| Socialist Labor | George P. Milonas | 10,509 | 0.23 |
| Communist | Nancy J. Cohen | 6,624 | 0.15 |
| Write-in | Others | 402 | 0.01 |
| Total votes | | 4,528,836 | 100 |

=== Secretary of State ===
1972 Illinois Secretary of State election
- November 7, 1972
- Turnout: 73.47%
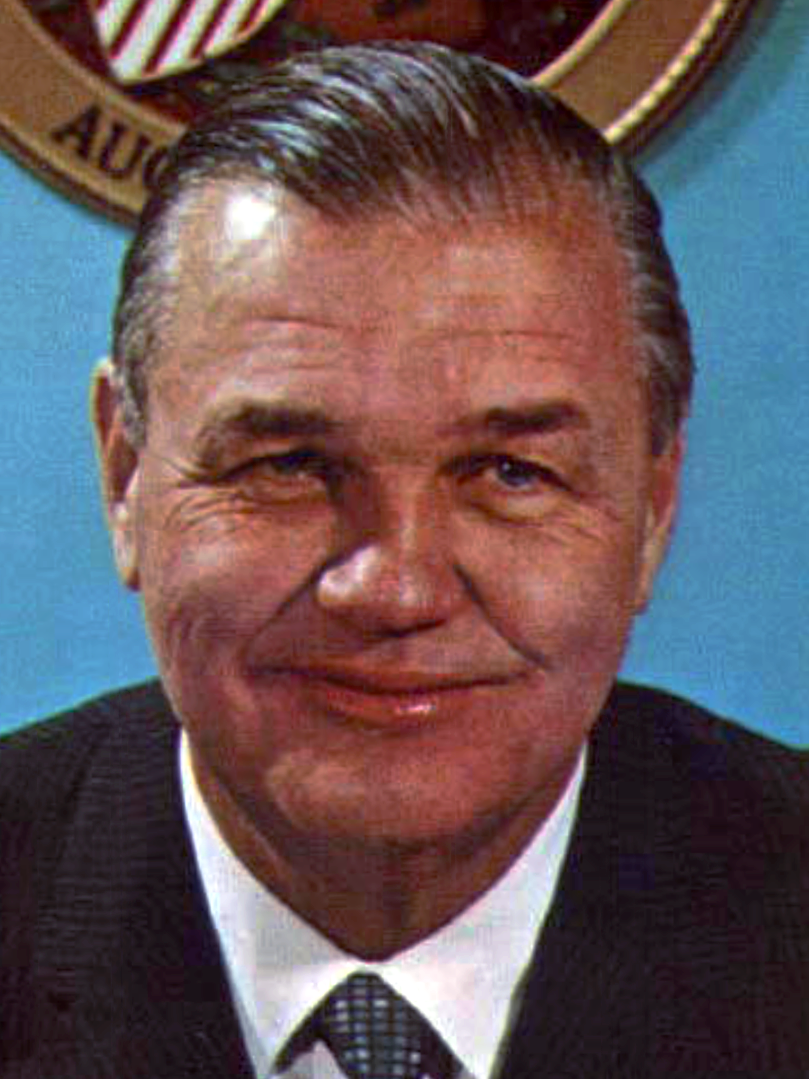

| Nominee | Michael Howlett | Edmund J. Kucharski |
| Party | Democratic | Republican |
| Popular vote | 2,360,327 | 2,187,554 |
| Percentage | 51.69% | 47.90% |
- County results Howlett: 50–60% 60–70% Kucharski: 50–60% 60–70%
Secretary of State before election
John W. Lewis Jr.
Republican
Elected Secretary of State
Michael Howlett
Democratic

Incumbent Secretary of State John W. Lewis Jr., a Republican, had been appointed in 1970. He did not seek reelection. Democrat Michael Howlett was elected to succeed him in office.

==== Democratic primary ====
Illinois Auditor of Public Accounts Michael J. Howlett won the Democratic primary, running unopposed.

Secretary of State Democratic primary
| Party | Candidate | Votes | % |
|---|---|---|---|
| Democratic | Michael J. Howlett | 1,039,947 | 100 |
| Write-in | Others | 20 | 0.00 |
| Total votes | | 1,039,967 | 100 |

==== Republican primary ====
Edmund J. Kucharski won the Republican primary, running unopposed.

Secretary of State Republican primary
| Party | Candidate | Votes | % |
|---|---|---|---|
| Republican | Edmund J. Kucharski | 503,473 | 100 |
| Write-in | Others | 16 | 0.00 |
| Total votes | | 503,489 | 100 |

==== General election ====
Secretary of State election
| Party | Candidate | Votes | % |
|---|---|---|---|
| Democratic | Michael Howlett | 2,360,327 | 51.69 |
| Republican | Edmund J. Kucharski | 2,187,554 | 47.90 |
| Socialist Labor | Elizabeth Schnur | 12,419 | 0.27 |
| Communist | Frances Gabow | 6,079 | 0.13 |
| Write-in | Others | 281 | 0.01 |
| Total votes | | 4,566,660 | 100 |

=== Comptroller ===
1972 Illinois State Comptroller election
- November 7, 1972
- Turnout: 69.74%
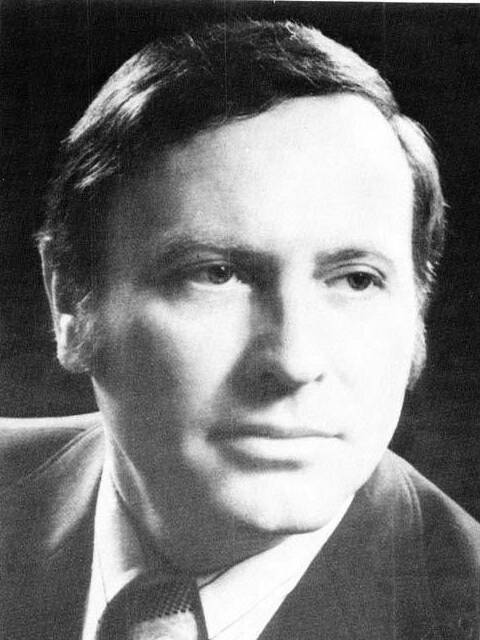

| Nominee | George W. Lindberg | Dean Barringer |
| Party | Republican | Democratic |
| Popular vote | 2,217,440 | 2,094,798 |
| Percentage | 51.15% | 48.33% |
- County results Lindberg: 40–50% 50–60% 60–70% 70–80% Barringer: 50–60% 60–70%
Auditor of Public Accounts before election
Michael Howlett
Democratic
State Comptroller
George W. Lindberg
Republican

Comptroller was a newly formed office, created by the 1970 Constitution of Illinois to replace the office of Auditor of Public Accounts, of which the outgoing incumbent was Democrat Michael Howlett, who instead opted to run for Secretary of State. Republican George W. Lindberg was elected the inaugural Illinois Comptroller.

==== Democratic primary ====
Dean Barringer won the Democratic primary, running unopposed.

Comptroller Democratic primary
| Party | Candidate | Votes | % |
|---|---|---|---|
| Democratic | Dean Barringer | 913,221 | 71.82 |
| Write-in | Others | 11 | 0.00 |
| Total votes | | 913,232 | 100 |

==== Republican primary ====
George W. Lindberg won the Republican primary, running unopposed.

Comptroller Republican primary
| Party | Candidate | Votes | % |
|---|---|---|---|
| Republican | George W. Lindberg | 480,769 | 100 |
| Write-in | Others | 3 | 0.00 |
| Total votes | | 480,772 | 100 |

==== General election ====
Comptroller election
| Party | Candidate | Votes | % |
|---|---|---|---|
| Republican | George W. Lindberg | 2,217,440 | 51.16 |
| Democratic | Dean Barringer | 2,094,798 | 48.33 |
| Socialist Labor | Clarys L. Essex | 12,797 | 0.30 |
| Communist | Nathan Sharpe | 9,325 | 0.22 |
| Write-in | Others | 287 | 0.01 |
| Total votes | | 4,334,647 | 100 |

=== State Senate ===
Seats of the Illinois Senate were up for election in 1972. Republicans flipped control of the chamber.

=== State House of Representatives ===
Seats in the Illinois House of Representatives were up for election in 1972. Republicans retained control of the chamber.

=== Trustees of University of Illinois ===
1972 Trustees of University of Illinois election
- November 7, 1972

An election was held for three of nine seats for Trustees of University of Illinois system.

The election saw the reelection of three-term former member Republican Park Livingston and first-term Republican incumbent Ralph Crane Hahn, as well as the election of new Republican member Jane S. Hayes Rader.

Democratic incumbent Robert B. Pogue (elected in a special election two years earlier) lost reelection.

Trustees of the University of Illinois election
| Party | Candidate | Votes | % |
|---|---|---|---|
| Republican | Ralph C. Hahn (incumbent) | 2,204,218 | 17.47 |
| Republican | Jane S. Hayes Rader | 2,199,006 | 17.42 |
| Republican | Park Livingston | 2,168,248 | 17.18 |
| Democratic | Ellen Augustyn | 2,014,589 | 15.96 |
| Democratic | Nicholas J. Bosen | 1,974,000 | 15.64 |
| Democratic | Roger B. Pogue (incumbent) | 1,938,476 | 15.36 |
| Socialist Labor | Edwin L. Williams | 28,855 | 0.23 |
| Socialist Labor | Henry Schilling | 23,168 | 0.18 |
| Socialist Labor | Gregory P. Lyngas | 19,838 | 0.16 |
| Communist | John Robert Lumpkin | 17,865 | 0.14 |
| Communist | Jack Kling | 15,880 | 0.13 |
| Communist | William R. Fugate | 15,699 | 0.12 |
| Write-in | Others | 553 | 0.00 |
| Total votes | | 12,620,395 | 100 |

=== Judicial elections ===
Multiple judicial positions were up for election in 1972.

== Local elections ==
Local elections were held.
