= 1976 Illinois elections =

- November 2, 1976
- Turnout: 77.38%

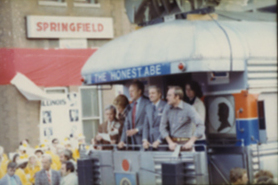
President Gerald Ford is joined by Republican gubernatorial nominee James R. Thompson at a whistle stop in Springfield

Elections were held in Illinois on Tuesday, November 2, 1976.

Primaries were held on March 16, 1976.

In order to, per Constitution of Illinois, allow for all statewide executive offices to be up for election in the 1978 midterms, all statewide executive offices up for election in 1976 were only elected to two-year terms.

== Election information ==
In order to, per Constitution of Illinois, allow for all statewide executive offices to be up for election in the 1978 midterms, all statewide executive offices up for election in 1976 were only elected to two-year terms.

This is would be the last time that any election for a nstatewide executive office would be held in Illinois during a presidential election year, until 2016, when a special election was held for comptroller.

=== Turnout ===
Turnout in the primary election was 21.55%, with a total of 1,239,487 ballots cast. 669,210 Democratic and 570,277 Republican primary ballots were cast.

Turnout during the general election was 77.38%, with 4,838,182 ballots cast.

== Federal elections ==
=== United States President ===
Illinois voted for the Republican ticket of Gerald Ford and Bob Dole.

=== United States House ===
All 24 Illinois seats in the United States House of Representatives were up for election in 1976.

Republicans flipped one seat, making the composition of Illinois' House delegation consist of 12 Democrats and 12 Republicans.

== State elections ==
=== Governor and Lieutenant Governor ===
1976 Illinois gubernatorial election
- November 2, 1976
- Turnout: 74.18%
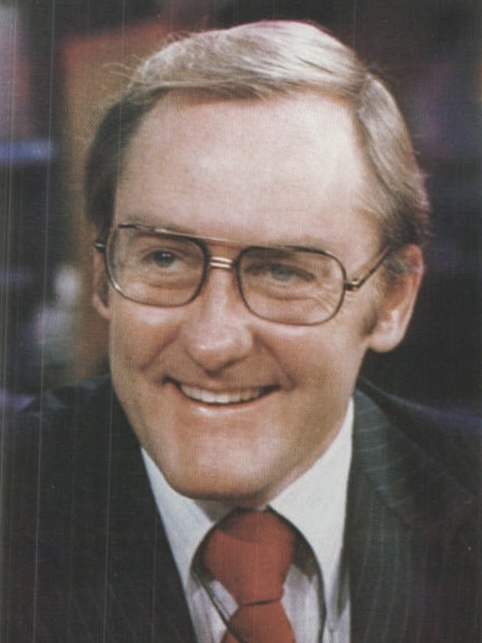

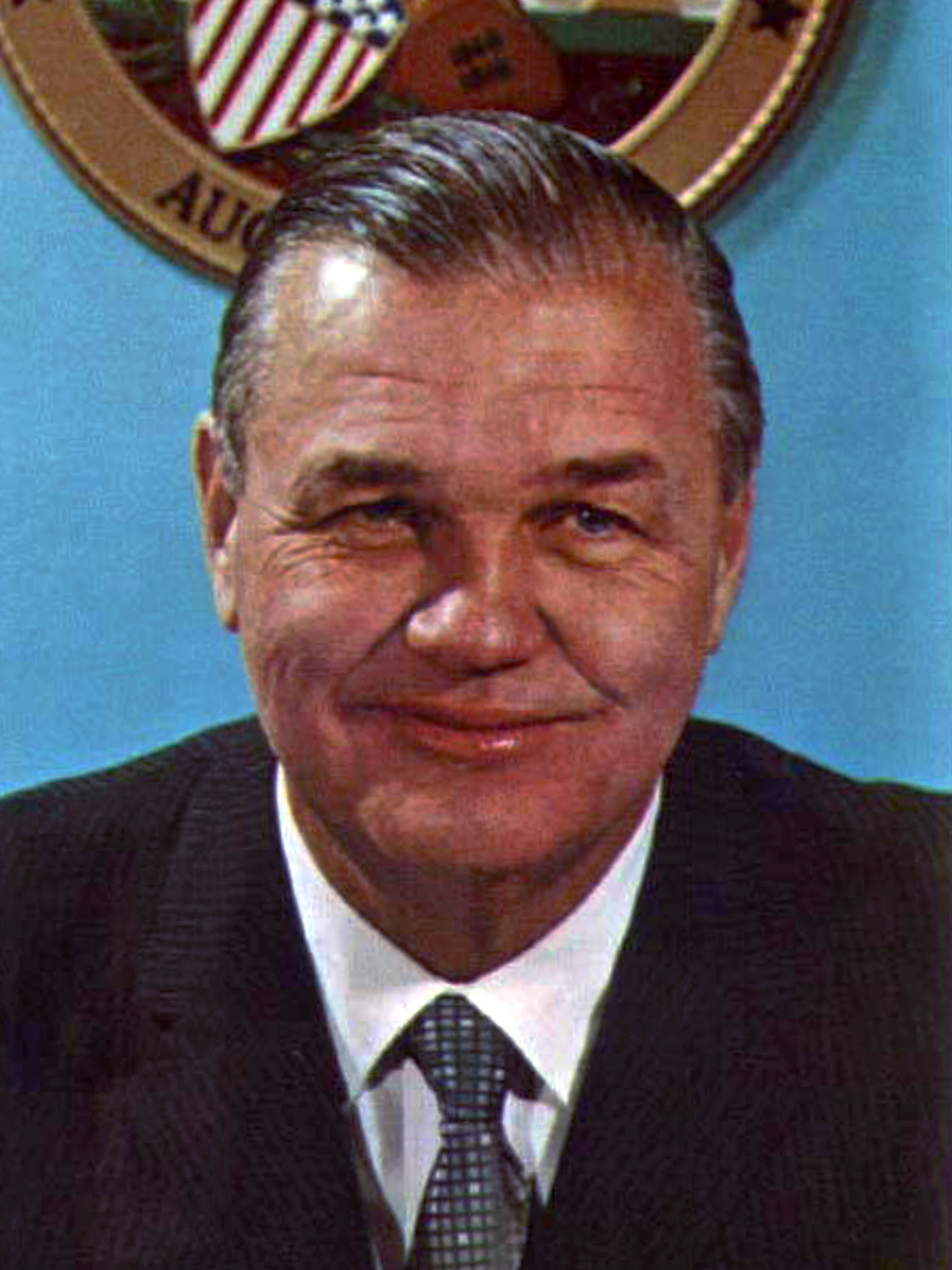
Nominee	James R. Thompson	Michael J. Howlett
Party	Republican	Democratic
Running mate	David C. O'Neal	Neil Hartigan
Popular vote	3,000,395	1,610,258
Percentage	64.68%	34.71%
- County Results Thompson: 50-60% 60-70% 70-80% 80-90% Howlett: 50–60%
Governor before election
Dan Walker
Democratic
Elected Governor
James R. Thompson
Republican

Incumbent Governor Dan Walker, a Democrat, had been defeated by Michael J. Howlett in the Democratic primary, while incumbent Lieutenant Governor Neil Hartigan was renominated in the Democratic lieutenant gubernatorial primary. The Republican ticket of James R. Thompson and David C. O'Neal won the election.

1976 gubernatorial election, Illinois
Party	Candidate	Votes	%
Republican	James R. Thompson/Dave O'Neal	3,000,365	64.68
Democratic	Michael J. Howlett/Neil F. Hartigan	1,610,258	34.71
Communist	Ishmael Flory/Linda R. Appelhans	10,091	0.22
Libertarian	F. Joseph McCaffrey/Georgia E. Shields	7,552	0.16
Socialist Workers	Suzanne Haig/Dennis Brasky	4,926	0.11
Socialist Labor	George LaForest/Stanley A. Prorok	3,147	0.07
U.S. Labor	Edward Waffle/Peter Matni	2,302	0.05
Write-in	Other	369	0.01
Total votes		4,639,010	100

=== Attorney General ===
1976 Illinois Attorney General election
- November 2, 1976
- Turnout: 72.15%
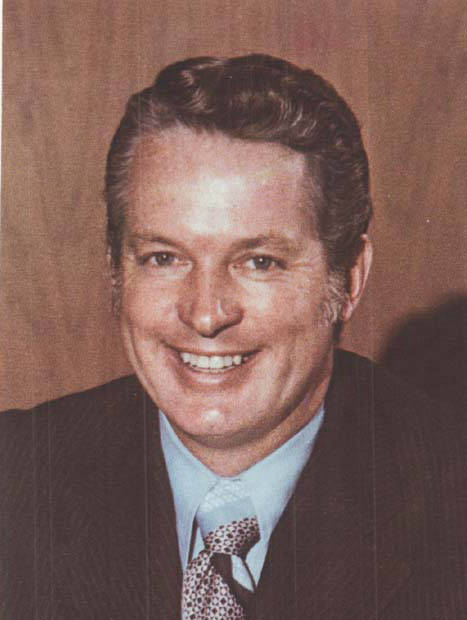

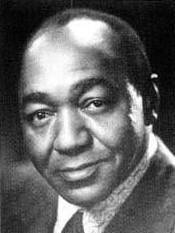
Nominee	William J. Scott	Cecil Partee
Party	Republican	Democratic
Popular vote	2,795,013	1,678,800
Percentage	61.95%	37.21%
- County results Scott: 50–60% 60–70% 70–80% 80–90% Partee: 50–60%
Attorney General before election
William J. Scott
Republican
Elected Attorney General
William J. Scott
Republican

Incumbent Attorney General William J. Scott, a Republican, was elected to a third term.

==== Democratic primary ====
President of the Illinois Senate Cecil Partee narrowly defeated Superintendent of the Illinois Department of Registration and Education Ronald E. Stackler in the Democratic primary.

Attorney General Democratic primary
Party	Candidate	Votes	%
Democratic	Cecil A. Partee	270,741	50.56
Democratic	Ronald E. Stackler	264,701	49.44
Total votes		535,442	100

==== Republican primary ====
Incumbent William J. Scott won the Republican primary, running unopposed.

Attorney General Republican primary
Party	Candidate	Votes	%
Republican	William J. Scott (incumbent)	485,940	100
Total votes		485,940	100

==== General election ====
Attorney General election
Party	Candidate	Votes	%
Republican	William J. Scott (incumbent)	2,795,013	61.95
Democratic	Cecil Partee	1,678,800	37.21
Communist	Theodore Pearson	11,150	0.25
Socialist Workers	Nancy J. Cohen	9,333	0.21
Libertarian	John C. Reis	9,165	0.20
Socialist Labor	George P. Milonas	4,344	0.10
U.S. Labor	Richard D. Leebove	3,918	0.16
Write-in	Others	45	0.00
Total votes		4,511,768	100

=== Secretary of State ===
1976 Illinois Secretary of State election
- November 2, 1976
- Turnout: 72.00%
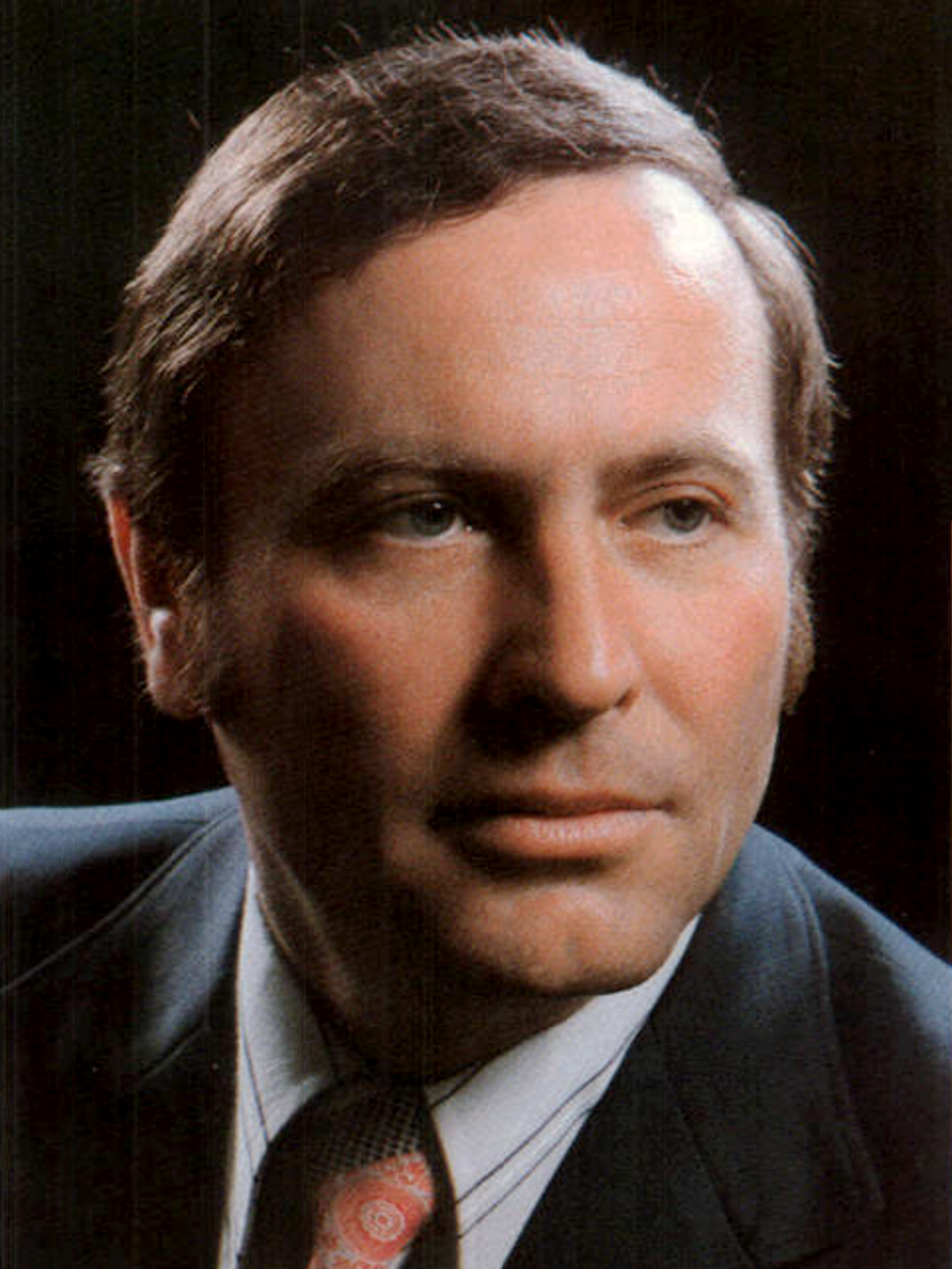

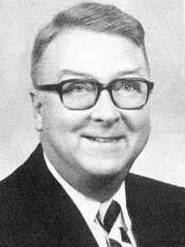
Nominee	Alan J. Dixon	William C. Harris
Party	Democratic	Republican
Popular vote	2,906,311	1,562,028
Percentage	64.55%	34.69%
- County results Dixon: 50–60% 60–70% 70–80% Harris: 50–60% 60–70%
Secretary of State before election
Michael Howlett
Democratic
Elected Secretary of State
Alan J. Dixon
Democratic

Incumbent Secretary of State Michael Howlett, a Democrat, did not seek a second term, instead opting to run for governor. Democrat Alan J. Dixon was elected to succeed him in office.

==== Democratic primary ====
Illinois Treasurer Alan J. Dixon won the Democratic primary, defeating Illinois State Senator Vince Demuzio.

Secretary of State Democratic primary
Party	Candidate	Votes	%
Democratic	Alan J. Dixon	984,934	77.35
Democratic	Vince Demuzio	288,354	22.65
Total votes		1,273,288	100

==== Republican primary ====
Illinois State Senator William C. Harris won the Republican primary, running unopposed.

Secretary of State Republican primary
Party	Candidate	Votes	%
Republican	William C. Harris	615,932	100
Total votes		615,932	100

==== General election ====
Secretary of State election
Party	Candidate	Votes	%
Democratic	Alan J. Dixon	2,906,311	64.55
Republican	William C. Harris	1,562,028	34.69
Libertarian	Ellyn Powelson	10,461	0.23
Communist	Frances Gabow	8,271	0.18
Socialist Workers	Eva Lynn Masterson	6,356	0.14
U.S. Labor	John H. Brown, Jr.	5,212	0.12
Socialist Labor	Ben Leonik	3,876	0.09
Write-in	Others	30	0.00
Total votes		4,502,545	100

=== Comptroller ===
1976 Illinois State Comptroller election
- November 2, 1976
- Turnout: 71.25%
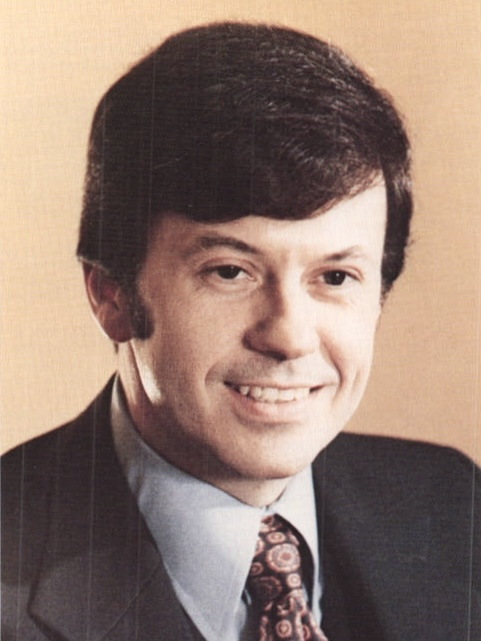

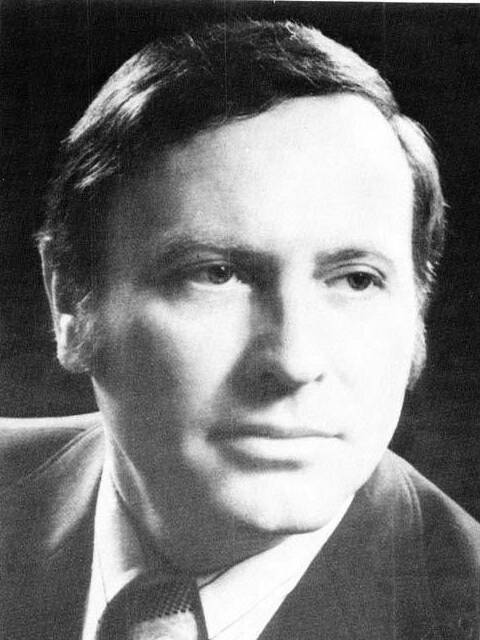
Nominee	Michael Bakalis	George W. Lindberg
Party	Democratic	Republican
Popular vote	2,298,074	2,117,977
Percentage	51.67%	47.53%
- County results Bakalis: 40–50% 50–60% 60–70% Lindberg: 40–50% 50–60% 60–70%
State Comptroller before election
George W. Lindberg
Republican
Elected State Comptroller
Michael Bakalis
Democratic

Incumbent Comptroller George W. Lindberg, a Republican running for a second term, was defeated by Democrat Michael Bakalis.

==== Democratic primary ====
Former Illinois Superintendent of Public Instruction Michael Bakalis won the Democratic primary, defeating Director of the Illinois State Department of General Services Roland Burris.

Secretary of State Democratic primary
Party	Candidate	Votes	%
Democratic	Michael J. Bakalis	900,294	71.82
Democratic	Roland W. Burris	353,252	28.18
Total votes		1,253,546	100

==== Republican primary ====
Incumbent George W. Lindberg won the Republican primary, running unopposed.

Secretary of State Republican primary
Party	Candidate	Votes	%
Republican	George W. Lindberg (incumbent)	619,698	100
Total votes		619,698	100

==== General election ====
Comptroller election
Party	Candidate	Votes	%
Democratic	Michael Bakalis	2,298,074	51.58
Republican	George W. Lindberg (incumbent)	2,117,977	47.53
Libertarian	Mark B. Wallace	13,789	0.31
Communist	Charles Hunter	10,992	0.25
U.S. Labor	Michael Braun	5,635	0.13
Socialist Workers	Clemens R. Bak	5,071	0.11
Socialist Labor	Gregory P. Lyngas	4,064	0.09
Write-in	Others	22	0.00
Total votes		4,455,624	100

=== State Senate ===
Seats of the Illinois Senate were up for election in 1976. Democrats retained control of the chamber.

=== State House of Representatives ===
Seats in the Illinois House of Representatives were up for election in 1976. Democrats retained control of the chamber.

=== Trustees of University of Illinois ===
1976 Trustees of University of Illinois election
- November 2, 1976

An election was held for three of nine seats for Trustees of University of Illinois system.

The election saw the reelection of first-term Democrats William D. Forsyth Jr., George W. Howard III, and Earl L. Neal.

Trustees of the University of Illinois election
Party	Candidate	Votes	%
Democratic	Earl L. Neal (incumbent)	2,221,506	18.17
Democratic	William D. Forsyth Jr. (incumbent)	2,056,442	16.82
Democratic	George W. Howard, III (incumbent)	1,971,033	16.12
Republican	Timothy W. Swain	1,968,391	16.10
Republican	Robert E. Allen	1,893,695	15.49
Republican	Dean Ennis Madden	1,789,409	14.64
Libertarian	Anne McCracken	44,472	0.36
U.S. Labor	Carol Leebove	30,233	0.25
Libertarian	James D. McCawley	27,542	0.23
Communist	Mark J. Almberg	25,641	0.21
Libertarian	Milton Altschuler	25,532	0.21
U.S. Labor	Helen Ratzlow	25,351	0.21
Socialist Labor	Doris Churchill	24,595	0.20
U.S. Labor	Shari Waffle	22,498	0.18
Communist	Altherna Medith	18,948	0.16
Communist	Jack Kling	17,414	0.14
Socialist Labor	Edwin L. Williams	14,970	0.12
Socialist Workers	Mark Harris	13,314	0.11
Socialist Workers	David W. Tucker	11,982	0.10
Socialist Workers	John Pottinger	10,752	0.09
Socialist Labor	Clarys L. Essex	10,671	0.09
Write-in	Others	113	0.00
Total votes		12,224,504	100

=== Judicial elections ===
Multiple judicial positions were up for election in 1976.

== Local elections ==
Local elections were held.
