= Jim Nowlan =

American academic and politician (born 1941)

James Dunlap Nowlan (born September 8, 1941) is an Illinois academic and politician.

== Early life ==
James Dunlap (Jim) Nowlan was born September 8, 1941, in Toulon, Illinois. He is a politician, professor, government executive and newspaper columnist.

He graduated from the University of Illinois Urbana-Champaign with a bachelor of arts in political science in 1963 and a master of arts in 1965. He worked for the Stark County News and as a college instructor. He was on active duty in the U.S. Army 1966-1968, achieving the rank of Captain

He was elected, as a Republican, to the Illinois House of Representatives in the 1968 general election alongside Democratic incumbent Tobias Barry and Republican incumbent Kenneth W. Miller as one of three representatives from the 39th district. The district included Bureau, Carroll, Henry, Stark, and Whiteside counties in northwestern Illinois.

In 1971, Gov. Richard B. Ogilvie asked Nowlan to be his running mate in the governor's bid for a second term. Nowlan won the primary unopposed. Ogilvie and Nowlan lost the general election by 50.7% to 49.0%. In his first term, Ogilvie successfully advocated for a new state income tax, which Nowlan supported in the House. Observers consider this a factor in their loss. The Ogilvie-Nowlan ticket lost to Dan Walker and Neil Hartigan.

After the 1972 loss, Nowlan returned to the University of Illinois at Urbana-Champaign to complete his PhD in political science. In 1973, he also taught at both Western Illinois University and Knox College. In 1975-76, Nowlan taught at the University of Illinois at Chicago.

In 1976, Nowlan volunteered in Jim Thompson's campaign for governor. After Thompson's election, the governor-elect asked Nowlan to stay on as his aide for education, and to serve as interim director of struggling state agencies (Professional Regulation and Financial Institutions).

In 1978, Illinois U.S. Sen. Charles Percy asked Nowlan to run his campaign for re-election, which was successful. In 1979, U.S. Rep. John B. Anderson asked Nowlan to be executive director of his Republican presidential exploratory committee. Nowlan organized the campaign for the liberal Republican Anderson; his work was called "brilliant" in the Pursuit of the Presidency(1980)

Nowlan left the campaign before Anderson became an Independent candidate in the summer of 1980. Nowlan blamed his departure on his own increasing mental depression as well as Anderson's lackluster campaigning.

From 1980 to 2000, Nowlan was for varying periods a professor at the University of Illinois at Urbana-Champaign; once again a trouble-shooting agency director for Thompson; a professor at Knox College in Galesburg, and president of the Taxpayers’ Federation of Illinois, a moderate business trade group.

From 2000 until 2015, Nowlan was a senior fellow at the University of Illinois Institute of Government and Public Affairs.

In service club speeches, Nowlan jokes that he has worked for three “unindicted” Illinois governors (Ogilvie, Thompson, and Edgar [the last very briefly]). From 1960 to 2015, there were seven elected governors, four of whom had been convicted of political and nonpolitical crimes.

In the 1986 gubernatorial election, Nowlan attempted to run as an independent candidate, but failed to meet the 25,000 signature requirement.

Nowlan considered challenging the Illinois law that required Independent candidates to file three times as many signatures as candidates of the major parties. But he decided against doing so when his former boss Jim Thompson decided to run that year for an unprecedented fourth term, something Nowlan had not earlier expected (conversation with Jessica Gray, Museum-Associate Curator, Bureau County Historical Society, February, 2023).

From 2000 to 2010, Nowlan was invited, on three occasions of six weeks each, to be a “foreign expert” (visiting professor) with the School of International Affairs and Public Administration at Fudan University in Shanghai. Nowlan taught short-courses in American politics for PhD students and also gave invited lectures at major universities across China, at Beijing, Xian, Nanjing, Suzhou, Shanghai. He also became, for several years, a columnist on “Understanding America” for the Oriental Morning Post, a major Chinese newspaper, based in Shanghai, which translated his pieces into Mandarin.

In 2000, Nowlan restarted the Stark County News in Toulon, Illinois, which his family had operated from 1897 until 1964. He sold the paper in 2019 to Jeff Lampe of Elmwood, who operates newspapers in central Illinois.

In 2010, Nowlan became a weekly columnist for the Small Newspaper Group in Illinois, writing about “Understanding Illinois.” In 2020-2022, Nowlan’s columns were distributed to the state’s 350 newspapers by the Illinois Press Association. That ended when Nowlan became chair of an independent campaign expenditure committee (Citizens for Judicial Fairness), which for the first time in the state’s history defeated an Illinois Supreme Court justice (Tom Kilbride) in his bid for retention on the court for a third 10-year term.

In 2013, Nowlan was appointed to the Illinois Executive Ethics Commission. He served as chair from 2015 until his term ended in 2016.

Nowlan is the author or co-author of nine books, five of which were published by university presses (Illinois; Northwestern, Nebraska). Two of the books are political novels set in Illinois and Chicago in the WWII-1970s (The Itinerant, 2000; The Editor’s Wife, 2005).

Nowlan and Janet Koran of Chicago were married in 1973. They divorced three years later. There were no children. Nowlan resides in Princeton, Illinois.

Party political offices
Preceded by Robert A. Dwyer	Republican nominee for Lieutenant Governor of Illinois; 1972	Succeeded by Dave O'Neal
