= 1976 Illinois State Comptroller election =

- November 2, 1976
- Turnout: 71.25%
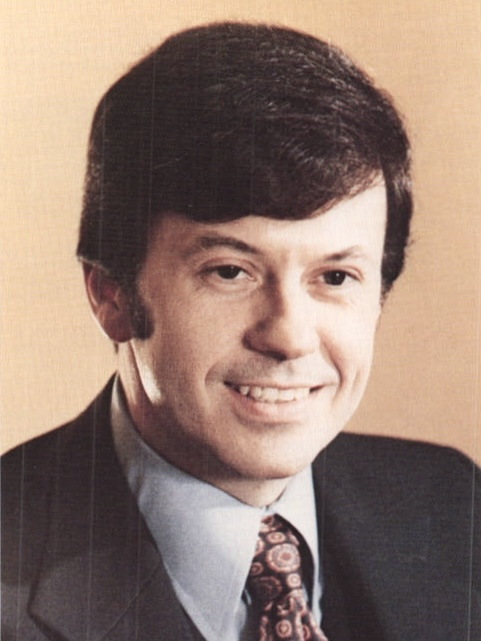

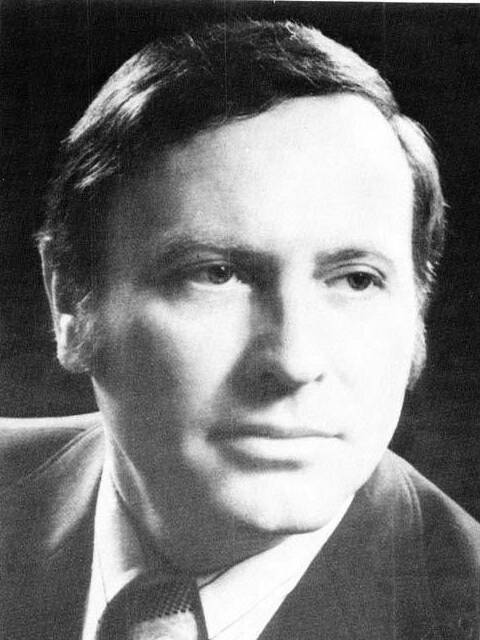
| Nominee | Michael Bakalis | George W. Lindberg |
| Party | Democratic | Republican |
| Popular vote | 2,298,074 | 2,117,977 |
| Percentage | 51.67% | 47.53% |
- County results Bakalis: 40–50% 50–60% 60–70% Lindberg: 40–50% 50–60% 60–70%
State Comptroller before election
George W. Lindberg
Republican
Elected State Comptroller
Michael Bakalis
Democratic

Incumbent Comptroller George W. Lindberg, a Republican running for a second term, was defeated by Democrat Michael Bakalis.

== Democratic primary ==
Former Illinois Superintendent of Public Instruction Michael Bakalis won the Democratic primary, defeating Director of the Illinois State Department of General Services Roland Burris.

Secretary of State Democratic primary
| Party | Candidate | Votes | % |
|---|---|---|---|
| Democratic | Michael J. Bakalis | 900,294 | 71.82 |
| Democratic | Roland W. Burris | 353,252 | 28.18 |
| Total votes | | 1,253,546 | 100 |

== Republican primary ==
Incumbent George W. Lindberg won the Republican primary, running unopposed.

Secretary of State Republican primary
| Party | Candidate | Votes | % |
|---|---|---|---|
| Republican | George W. Lindberg (incumbent) | 619,698 | 100 |
| Total votes | | 619,698 | 100 |

== General election ==
Comptroller election
| Party | Candidate | Votes | % |
|---|---|---|---|
| Democratic | Michael Bakalis | 2,298,074 | 51.58 |
| Republican | George W. Lindberg (incumbent) | 2,117,977 | 47.53 |
| Libertarian | Mark B. Wallace | 13,789 | 0.31 |
| Communist | Charles Hunter | 10,992 | 0.25 |
| U.S. Labor | Michael Braun | 5,635 | 0.13 |
| Socialist Workers | Clemens R. Bak | 5,071 | 0.11 |
| Socialist Labor | Gregory P. Lyngas | 4,064 | 0.09 |
| Write-in | Others | 22 | 0.00 |
| Total votes | | 4,455,624 | 100 |
