= Michael Bakalis =

American academic and politician

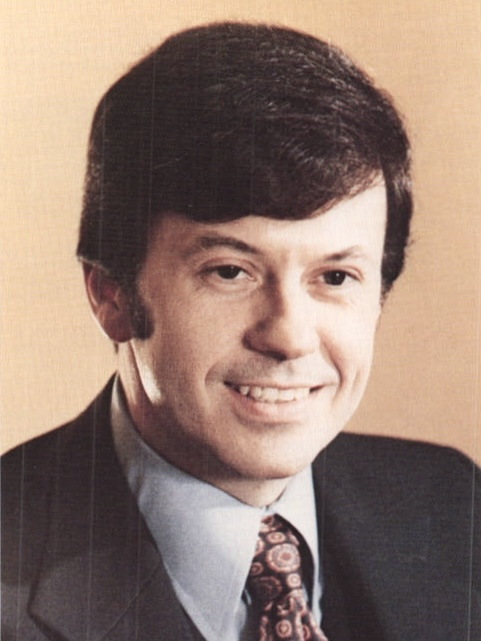
- Official portrait, circa 1977

2nd Comptroller of Illinois
- In office January 1, 1977 – January 8, 1979
- Governor: Jim Thompson
- Preceded by: George W. Lindberg
- Succeeded by: Roland Burris

Illinois Superintendent of Public Instruction
- In office January 11, 1971 – January 13, 1975
- Governor: Richard B. Ogilvie; Dan Walker
- Preceded by: Ray Page
- Succeeded by: Joseph Cronin (as "Illinois State Superintendent")

Personal details
- Born: March 23, 1938 (age 88) Berwyn, Illinois, U.S.
- Party: Democratic
- Education: Northwestern University (BA, MA, PhD)
- Profession: Educator

Michael J. Bakalis (born March 23, 1938) is an American educator, academic administrator, and politician. He was the Democratic nominee for Governor of Illinois in 1978, losing to incumbent Republican governor James R. Thompson.

== Biography ==
Bakalis received his bachelor's, master's, and doctoral degrees from Northwestern University in 1959, 1962, and 1966, respectively. His academic career includes service as assistant dean at Northern Illinois University, dean of the School of Education at Loyola University Chicago, and as the President of Triton College. He has also been a member of the faculty at the Kellogg Graduate School of Management at Northwestern University since 1994, where he teaches public and non-profit management, policy, and strategy.

In government and politics, Bakalis served as the Illinois State Superintendent of Education from 1971 to 1975 and as Illinois Comptroller from 1977 to 1979. Having built a reputation as a staunch advocate of education, in 1978, he won the Democratic nomination for governor. During the election, Bakalis was critical of Thompson's education and tax policies and aggressively courted voters. However, because Thompson was serving an unusual two-year term as governor and so had been in office only nine months when Bakalis began his campaign, Bakalis had difficulty challenging the incumbent's record. Bakalis lost the election with 40% of the vote, as opposed to Thompson's 59%.

After his unsuccessful bid for governorship, Bakalis served as a Deputy Undersecretary in the United States Department of Education of the Jimmy Carter administration from 1980 to 1982, where he administered ten regional offices.

In 1988, he managed the Illinois campaign of Michael Dukakis's bid for the US President. In 2002, Bakalis made another run for governor but had to drop out before the Democratic primary because of a lack of money.

Bakalis is also the founder, President and CEO of American Quality Schools, an education management organization that operates charter schools in the Midwestern United States.

Political offices
Preceded by George W. Lindberg	Illinois Comptroller; 1977 – 1979	Succeeded by Roland Burris
Party political offices
Preceded by Dean Barringer	Democratic nominee for Illinois Comptroller; 1976	Succeeded by Roland Burris
Preceded by Michael Howlett	Democratic Nominee for Governor of Illinois; 1978	Succeeded by Adlai E. Stevenson III
