= 1972 Illinois gubernatorial election =

- November 7, 1972
- Turnout: 75.28% ▼4.11 pp
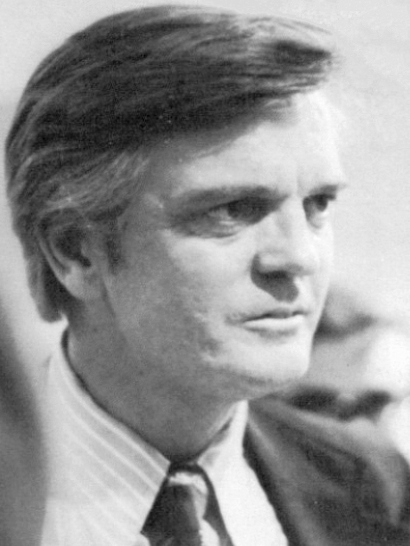

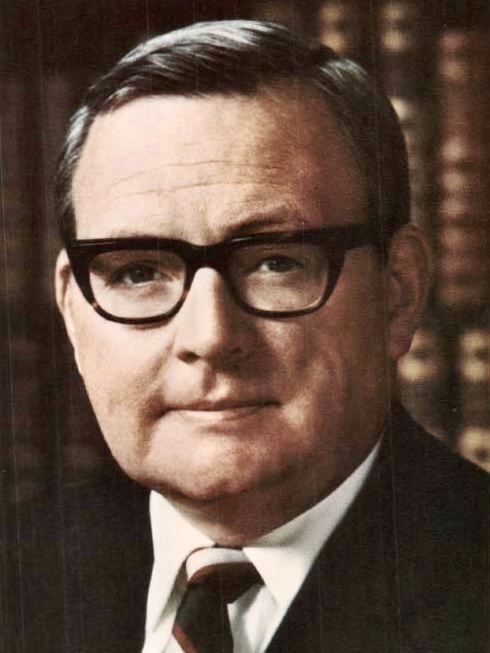
Nominee	Dan Walker	Richard B. Ogilvie
Party	Democratic	Republican
Running mate	Neil Hartigan	Jim Nowlan
Popular vote	2,371,303	2,293,809
Percentage	50.68%	49.02%
- County results Walker: 40–50% 50–60% 60–70% Ogilvie: 50–60% 60–70%
Governor before election
Richard B. Ogilvie
Republican
Elected Governor
Dan Walker
Democratic

The 1972 Illinois gubernatorial election was held in Illinois on November 7, 1972. Incumbent first-term Republican governor Richard B. Ogilvie lost reelection in an upset to the Democratic nominee, Dan Walker.

This was the first election in which each party's nominee for lieutenant governor of Illinois ran on a ticket with the gubernatorial nominee for the general election. Previously, there had been two separate elections for the two offices. This was the last election of the 20th century in which a Democrat won the governorship of Illinois, with all seven remaining elections of that century being won by Republican nominees.

== Background ==
This was the first gubernatorial election in which gubernatorial and lieutenant gubernatorial candidates were elected on a ticket in the general election, per the 1970 Constitution of Illinois.

The election coincided with those for federal offices (United States president, Senate, and House) and other state offices. The election was part of the 1972 Illinois elections. Walker was the last Democrat to be elected governor of Illinois for 30 years, until Rod Blagojevich was elected in 2002.

The primaries were held on March 21, 1972.

Turnout in the primaries saw 36.09% in the gubernatorial primaries, with a total of 2,015,694 votes cast, and 30.46% in the lieutenant gubernatorial primary, with 1,701,418 votes cast. Turnout during the general election was 75.28%, with 4,679,043 votes cast.

== Democratic primaries ==
=== Governor ===
In an upset, Dan Walker won a close primary against then-Lt. Governor Paul Simon. Simon had been the candidate slated by the state party.

County map of the 1972 Illinois Democratic gubernatorial primary Walker: 50–60% 60–70% 70–80% Simon: 50–60% 60–70% 70–80% 80–90%

1972 Democratic gubernatorial primary, Illinois
Party	Candidate	Votes	%
Democratic	Daniel Walker	735,193	51.41
Democratic	Paul Simon	694,900	48.59
Write-in		24	0.00
Majority		40,293	2.82
Total votes		1,430,117	

=== Lieutenant governor ===
Neil Hartigan, the candidate slated by the state party, defeated Carbondale mayor Neal Eckert, Walker's declared preferred running mate.

Democratic lieutenant gubernatorial primary
Party	Candidate	Votes	%
Democratic	Neil F. Hartigan	802,449	65.37
Democratic	Neal E. Eckert	425,021	34.63
Write-in		16	0.00
Total votes		1,227,486	100

== Republican primaries ==
=== Governor ===
Ogilvie won renomination easily. His main rival, John M. Mathis, was a favorite son of the Peoria area, and fared poorly elsewhere.

1972 Republican gubernatorial primary, Illinois
Party	Candidate	Votes	%	±%
Republican	Richard B. Ogilvie (incumbent)	442,323	75.54	
Republican	John M. Mathis	143,053	24.43	
Write-in		201	0.03	
Majority		299,270	51.11	
Total votes		585,577		

=== Lieutenant governor ===
James D. Nowlan won the Republican primary for lieutenant governor, running unopposed.

Republican lieutenant gubernatorial primary
Party	Candidate	Votes	%
Republican	James D. Nowlan	473,916	100
Write-in		16	0.00
Total votes		473,932	100

== General election ==
1972 gubernatorial election, Illinois
Party	Candidate	Votes	%	±%
Democratic	Daniel Walker/Neil F. Hartigan	2,371,303	50.68	+2.31
Republican	Richard B. Ogilvie (incumbent)/James D. Nowlan	2,293,809	49.02	−2.19
Socialist Labor	George LaForest/Stanley L. Prorok	7,966	0.17	−0.26
Communist	Ishmael Flory/Theodore Pearson	4,592	0.10	N/A
Write-in		1,373	0.03	N/A
Majority		77,494	1.66	−1.18
Total votes		4,679,043		
Democratic gain from Republican		Swing		
