= Senator Laughlin =

Senator Laughlin may refer to:

- Dan Laughlin (born c. 1962), Pennsylvania State Senate
- Edward E. Laughlin (1887–1952), Illinois State Senate
- Gail Laughlin (1868–1952), Maine State Senate
- John Laughlin (New York politician) (1856–1905), New York State Senate
- Owen Laughlin (fl. 1990s–2000s), Oklahoma State Senate

== See also ==
- Cindy O'Laughlin (fl. 2010s–present), Missouri State Senate
