= Amy St. Eve =

American federal judge (born 1965)

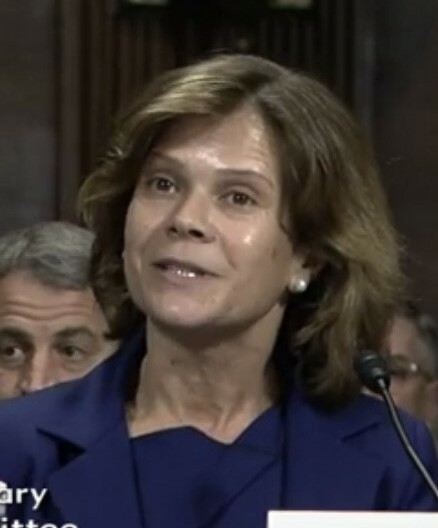

Judge of the United States Court of Appeals for the Seventh Circuit
- Incumbent
- Assumed office May 23, 2018
- Appointed by: Donald Trump
- Preceded by: Ann Claire Williams

Judge of the United States District Court for the Northern District of Illinois
- In office August 2, 2002 – May 23, 2018
- Appointed by: George W. Bush
- Preceded by: George W. Lindberg
- Succeeded by: Mary M. Rowland

Personal details
- Born: 1965 (age 60–61) Belleville, Illinois, U.S.
- Education: Cornell University (BA, JD)

Amy Joan St. Eve (born 1965) is an American lawyer and jurist serving since 2018 as a United States circuit judge of the United States Court of Appeals for the Seventh Circuit. She previously served as a United States district judge of the United States District Court for the Northern District of Illinois from 2002 to 2018.

== Early life and education ==
Raised in Belleville, Illinois, St. Eve received her Bachelor of Arts degree from Cornell University in 1987. She then attended Cornell Law School, where she was an editor of the Cornell Law Review. She graduated in 1990 ranked first in her class with a Juris Doctor.

== Legal career ==
Following law school graduation, St. Eve was in private practice at Davis Polk & Wardwell in New York City from 1990 to 1994. She was an associate independent counsel at the Whitewater Independent Counsel's Office in Little Rock, Arkansas from 1994 to 1996, where she successfully prosecuted former Arkansas Governor Jim Guy Tucker and Whitewater partners Jim and Susan McDougal for fraud.

From 1996 to 2001, St. Eve served as an Assistant United States Attorney for the Northern District of Illinois. She was a Senior Counsel for Abbott Laboratories, Abbott Park, Illinois, from 2001 to 2002, when she became a federal judge.

== Federal judicial career ==
=== District court service ===
On March 21, 2002, St. Eve was nominated by President George W. Bush to a seat on the United States District Court for the Northern District of Illinois vacated by Judge George W. Lindberg, who assumed senior status. She was recommended for the post by United States Senator Peter Fitzgerald. Fitzgerald told the Chicago Tribune in 2003 that before St. Eve applied for the judgeship, "I didn't know Amy or know anyone who knew Amy. I was looking for the best qualified person." She was confirmed by the United States Senate on August 1, 2002, and received her commission the following day. Her service on the district court terminated in 2018, when she was elevated to the court of appeals.

St. Eve was reportedly considered by the Trump administration for the position of Director of the Federal Bureau of Investigation after the dismissal of James Comey, but ultimately did not receive the job as it went to Christopher A. Wray.

=== Court of appeals service ===
On February 12, 2018, President Donald Trump announced his intent to nominate St. Eve to an undetermined seat on the United States Court of Appeals for the Seventh Circuit. On February 15, 2018, her nomination was sent to the Senate. President Trump nominated St. Eve to the seat on the United States Court of Appeals for the Seventh Circuit vacated by Judge Ann Claire Williams, who assumed senior status on June 5, 2017. On March 21, 2018, a hearing on her nomination was held before the Senate Judiciary Committee. On April 19, 2018, her nomination was reported out of committee by a 21–0 vote. On May 14, 2018, the United States Senate confirmed her nomination by a 91–0 vote. She received her judicial commission on May 23, 2018.

=== Notable cases ===
- On October 16, 2025, St. Eve was one of three judges who blocked the Trump administration from deploying the National Guard against protesters in Chicago.. The Trump administration appealed to the Supreme Court, and on December 23, 2025, the Supreme Court declined to reverse the ruling blocking National Guard deployment.

Legal offices
Preceded by George W. Lindberg	Judge of the United States District Court for the Northern District of Illinois; 2002–2018	Succeeded by Mary M. Rowland
Preceded by Ann Claire Williams	Judge of the United States Court of Appeals for the Seventh Circuit; 2018–present	Incumbent
