= Manish S. Shah =

American judge (born 1972)

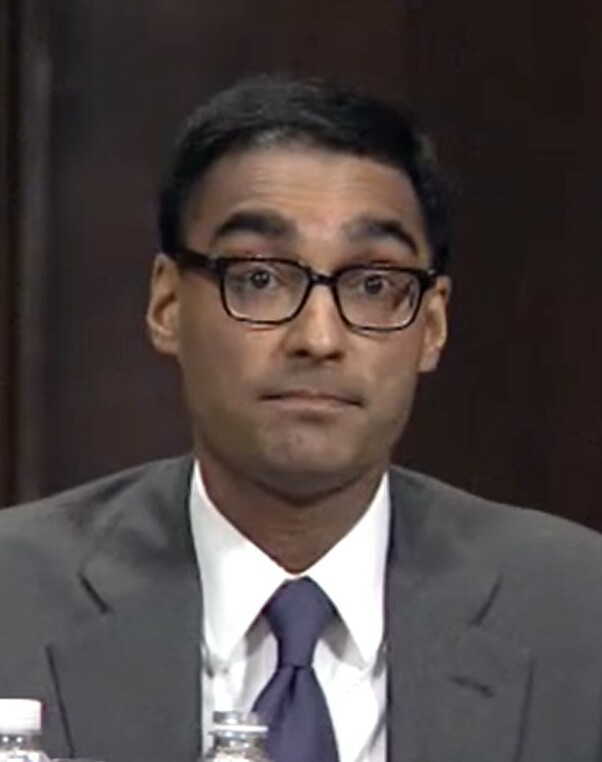
- Shah in 2013

Judge of the United States District Court for the Northern District of Illinois
- Incumbent
- Assumed office May 1, 2014
- Appointed by: Barack Obama
- Preceded by: Joan Lefkow

Personal details
- Born: Manish Suresh Shah; November 3, 1972 (age 53) New York City, New York, U.S.
- Education: Stanford University (BA); University of Chicago (JD)

Manish Suresh Shah (born November 3, 1972) is a United States district judge of the United States District Court for the Northern District of Illinois and former assistant United States attorney for the same court.

== Biography ==
Born in New York City, Shah received a Bachelor of Arts degree in history, cum laude, in 1994 from Stanford University. He received a J.D. degree, cum laude, in 1998 from the University of Chicago Law School. He worked as an associate at the law firm of Heller, Ehrman, White & McAuliffe in San Francisco, California, from 1998 to 1999. He served as a law clerk to Judge James Zagel of the United States District Court for the Northern District of Illinois from 1999 to 2001. He served as an Assistant United States Attorney in the Northern District of Illinois from 2001–2014. He served as Deputy Chief of the General Crimes Section from 2007 to 2008, Deputy Chief of the Financial Crimes & Special Prosecutions Section from 2008 to 2011, Chief of Criminal Appeals from 2011 to 2012 and previously served as Chief of the Criminal Division.

=== Federal judicial service ===
Shah was recommended to fill a judicial vacancy on the District Court for the Northern District of Illinois by Republican Senator Mark Kirk. On September 19, 2013, President Barack Obama nominated Shah to the seat vacated by Judge Joan Lefkow, who assumed senior status on September 1, 2012. On January 16, 2014 his nomination was reported out of committee by a voice vote. On April 11, 2014 Senate Majority Leader Reid filed a motion to invoke cloture on his nomination. On April 29, 2014, the United States Senate invoked cloture on his nomination by a 57–40 vote. On April 30, 2014, his nomination was confirmed by a 95–0 vote. He received his commission on May 1, 2014.

== See also ==
- List of Asian American jurists
- List of first minority male lawyers and judges in Illinois

Legal offices
Preceded by Joan Lefkow	Judge of the United States District Court for the Northern District of Illinois; 2014–present	Incumbent
