= 1972 Illinois State Comptroller election =

- November 7, 1972
- Turnout: 69.74%
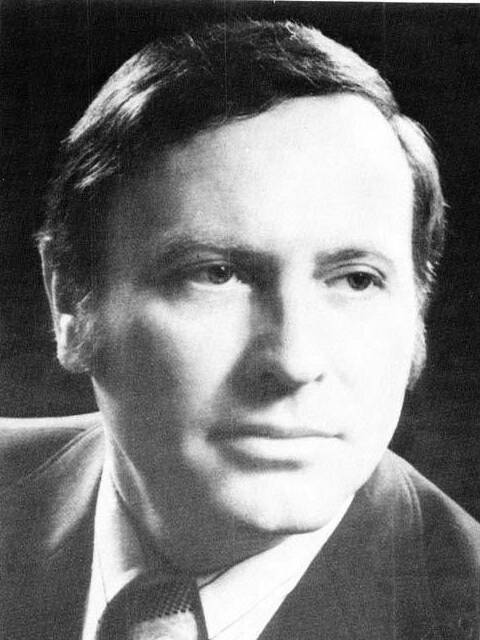

| Nominee | George W. Lindberg | Dean Barringer |
| Party | Republican | Democratic |
| Popular vote | 2,217,440 | 2,094,798 |
| Percentage | 51.15% | 48.33% |
- County results Lindberg: 40–50% 50–60% 60–70% 70–80% Barringer: 50–60% 60–70%
Auditor of Public Accounts before election
Michael Howlett
Democratic
State Comptroller
George W. Lindberg
Republican

Comptroller was a newly formed office, created by the 1970 Constitution of Illinois to replace the office of Auditor of Public Accounts, of which the outgoing incumbent was Democrat Michael Howlett, who instead opted to run for Secretary of State. Republican George W. Lindberg was elected the inaugural Illinois Comptroller.

== Democratic primary ==
Dean Barringer won the Democratic primary, running unopposed.

Comptroller Democratic primary
| Party | Candidate | Votes | % |
|---|---|---|---|
| Democratic | Dean Barringer | 913,221 | 71.82 |
| Write-in | Others | 11 | 0.00 |
| Total votes | | 913,232 | 100 |

== Republican primary ==
George W. Lindberg won the Republican primary, running unopposed.

Comptroller Republican primary
| Party | Candidate | Votes | % |
|---|---|---|---|
| Republican | George W. Lindberg | 480,769 | 100 |
| Write-in | Others | 3 | 0.00 |
| Total votes | | 480,772 | 100 |

== General election ==
Comptroller election
| Party | Candidate | Votes | % |
|---|---|---|---|
| Republican | George W. Lindberg | 2,217,440 | 51.16 |
| Democratic | Dean Barringer | 2,094,798 | 48.33 |
| Socialist Labor | Clarys L. Essex | 12,797 | 0.30 |
| Communist | Nathan Sharpe | 9,325 | 0.22 |
| Write-in | Others | 287 | 0.01 |
| Total votes | | 4,334,647 | 100 |
