= Jarrett M. Adams =

American criminal defense attorney, civil rights advocate, author

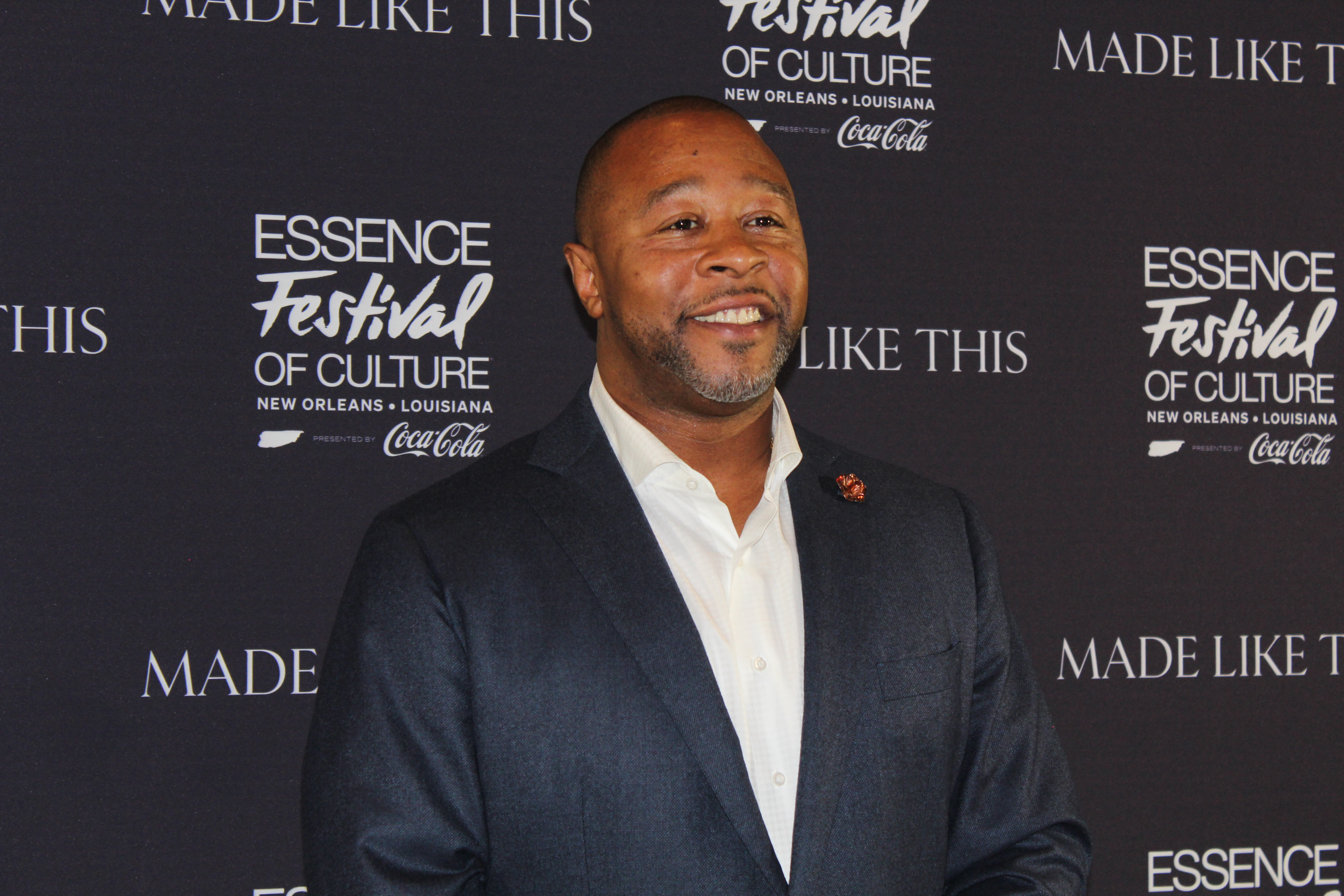
- Jarrett Adams at EssenceFest 2025
- Born: Chicago, Illinois, U.S.
- Education: Loyola University Chicago School of Law (JD)
- Occupations: Criminal defense attorney; author; civil rights advocate
- Employers: Innocence Project (former); Law Offices of Jarrett Adams, PLLC (founder)
- Organization: Life After Justice (co-founder)
- Known for: Wrongful conviction and exoneration
- Website: www.jarrettadamslaw.com

Jarrett M. Adams is an American criminal defense attorney, civil rights advocate, author, and exoneree. Wrongfully convicted of sexual assault at age 17 and sentenced to 28 years in a Wisconsin maximum-security prison, Adams served nearly ten years before the United States Court of Appeals for the Seventh Circuit unanimously overturned his conviction in 2006 on grounds of ineffective assistance of counsel, with assistance from the Wisconsin Innocence Project. Following his exoneration, Adams earned a law degree and became the first exoneree ever hired as a staff attorney by the Innocence Project. He founded the Law Offices of Jarrett Adams, PLLC in 2017 and co-founded the nonprofit Life After Justice. In 2021, he published his memoir Redeeming Justice: From Defendant to Defender, My Fight for Equity on Both Sides of a Broken System (Convergent Books/Penguin Random House), which received independent reviews in Kirkus Reviews and Booklist.

== Early life ==
Jarrett M. Adams was born and raised on the South Side of Chicago, Illinois.

== Wrongful conviction ==
=== Arrest and trial ===
On September 6, 1998, seventeen-year-old Adams traveled with two friends from Chicago to Whitewater, Wisconsin. Following a social encounter at the University of Wisconsin–Whitewater, Adams and his co-defendants were accused of sexual assault. An all-white jury convicted Adams despite his account that the encounter was consensual. He was sentenced to 28 years in a maximum-security prison.

Adams's court-appointed public defender called no witnesses on his behalf, despite the existence of a potential witness who had seen the accuser socializing with Adams and his friends after the alleged crime took place. The Seventh Circuit Court would later find that Adams's lawyer had "committed to a predetermined strategy without a reasonable investigation that could have produced a pivotal witness." His co-defendant, represented by private counsel, had all charges dismissed. Adams was required to continue appealing for years before the same charges were eventually dropped in his own case.

=== Incarceration ===
During his incarceration, Adams spent time in solitary confinement at a supermax facility. He began studying legal texts in the prison law library, educating himself on constitutional law and the specific circumstances of his case, eventually becoming an informal legal resource for other incarcerated individuals.

=== Exoneration ===
In 2004, the Wisconsin Innocence Project agreed to take on Adams's case. Attorneys identified that Adams's Sixth Amendment right to effective assistance of counsel had been violated due to his trial lawyer's failure to call available witnesses.

On June 30, 2006, the United States Court of Appeals for the Seventh Circuit unanimously reversed Adams's conviction, with Judge Daniel Manion writing for a three-judge panel that Adams's trial lawyer had committed to a predetermined strategy without conducting a reasonable investigation. In February 2007, after nearly a decade of incarceration, all charges against Adams were dismissed, and he was released.

On December 17, 2009, the Wisconsin Claims Board rejected Adams's subsequent claim for compensation, concluding that the evidence did not clearly and convincingly establish his innocence.

== Legal education and career ==
=== Law school ===
Following his release, Adams was awarded the Abraham Lincoln Marovitz Public Interest Law Scholarship by the Chicago Bar Foundation. He earned his Juris Doctor from Loyola University Chicago School of Law in May 2015.

During law school, Adams worked as an investigator for the Illinois Federal Defender's Program. For his work on the clemency petition of Reynolds Wintersmith — a petition ultimately granted by President Barack Obama — he received the National Defender Investigator Association Investigator of the Year Award.

=== Judicial clerkships ===
After graduating, Adams served as a public interest law fellow with Judge Ann Claire Williams of the United States Court of Appeals for the Seventh Circuit — the same court that had reversed his wrongful conviction. He subsequently clerked for the late Honorable Deborah Batts of the United States District Court for the Southern District of New York.

=== Innocence Project ===
Adams joined the Innocence Project in New York in July 2016, becoming the first exoneree ever hired as a staff attorney by the organization. He was part of the legal team that obtained a new trial for Richard Beranek, who was released in 2018 from the same prison in which Adams had been wrongly incarcerated.

=== Law firm ===
In 2017, Adams founded the Law Offices of Jarrett Adams, PLLC, with offices in New York City, Chicago, and Milwaukee, focusing on criminal defense, civil rights, and wrongful conviction cases in federal and state courts.

== Life After Justice ==
Adams is co-founder of Life After Justice, a 501(c)(3) nonprofit organization dedicated to preventing wrongful convictions and supporting exonerees as they reintegrate into society, with a particular emphasis on mental health and economic justice.

== Redeeming Justice (2021) ==
In September 2021, Adams published his memoir, Redeeming Justice: From Defendant to Defender, My Fight for Equity on Both Sides of a Broken System (Convergent Books, an imprint of Penguin Random House).

Kirkus Reviews described it as a consuming account of a broken legal system and the fortitude needed to overcome its lasting damage, noting readers would rarely find a moment where they did not want to know what came next. Booklist described Adams's story as a powerful tool in his ongoing fight against systemic injustice.

WTTW's Chicago Tonight: Black Voices featured Adams in October 2021, with correspondent Erica Gunderson reporting that Adams had spent ten years in prison for a crime he always maintained he did not commit, studying the legal system to overturn his own case before becoming a lawyer working to help others like himself.

The New Pittsburgh Courier described the book as testimony to Adams's refusal to give up on himself and his commitment to fighting the very system that had failed him.

== Media coverage and recognition ==
Adams was featured on NBC Nightly News with Lester Holt in August 2017 in a segment covering his exoneration and his work representing others who had been wrongfully convicted. He has also been featured on CNN, MSNBC, ABC News, and CBS News.

The State Bar of Wisconsin's publication InsideTrack featured Adams as a keynote speaker at its 2021 Annual Meeting and Conference, where he addressed racial injustice and criminal justice reform.

Adams is listed in the National Registry of Exonerations, maintained jointly by the University of California, Irvine, the University of Michigan Law School, and Michigan State University College of Law.
