= Mary M. Rowland =

American judge (born 1961)

Mary Rowland
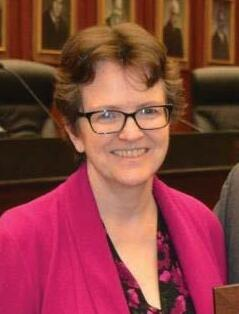
- Rowland in 2019

Judge of the United States District Court for the Northern District of Illinois
- Incumbent
- Assumed office August 20, 2019
- Appointed by: Donald Trump
- Preceded by: Amy St. Eve

Personal details
- Born: October 8, 1961 (age 65) Akron, Ohio, U.S.
- Education: University of Michigan (BA); University of Chicago (JD)

Mary Margaret Rowland (born October 8, 1961) is a United States district judge of the United States District Court for the Northern District of Illinois and a former United States Magistrate Judge for the same court.

== Personal life and education ==
Rowland was born in Akron, Ohio on October 8, 1961. She earned her Bachelor of Arts from the University of Michigan and her Juris Doctor from the University of Chicago Law School.

Rowland worked on Carl Levin's 1984 U.S. Senate campaign and served as a legal observer for Barack Obama's 2008 presidential campaign.

== Career ==
Upon graduation from law school, Rowland served as a law clerk to Judge Julian A. Cook of the United States District Court for the Eastern District of Michigan.

Prior to becoming a federal magistrate judge, she spent twelve years as a partner in the Chicago firm of Hughes, Socol, Piers, Resnick & Dym. Before entering private practice, she served for ten years in the Chicago office of the Federal Public Defender; first as a staff attorney and later as the office's Chief Appellate Attorney.

In 2009, Rowland was first recommended to the Obama Administration to be a Federal judge by U.S. Senator Dick Durbin.

=== Federal judicial service ===
From October 1, 2012, to August 20, 2019, Rowland served as a United States Magistrate Judge for the Northern District of Illinois. She was officially sworn in on October 1, 2012. At the time of her appointment, she was one of only a few openly gay judges in the country.

On June 7, 2018, President Donald Trump announced his intent to nominate Rowland to serve as a United States district judge for the United States District Court for the Northern District of Illinois. Her nomination was the result of an agreement between Trump and Illinois' two Democratic U.S. Senators, Dick Durbin and Tammy Duckworth. On June 18, 2018, her nomination was sent to the Senate. President Trump nominated Rowland to the seat vacated by Judge Amy St. Eve, who was elevated to the United States Court of Appeals for the Seventh Circuit on May 23, 2018. Rowland was President Trump's first openly gay judicial nominee. On August 22, 2018, a hearing on her nomination was held before the Senate Judiciary Committee. On October 11, 2018, her nomination was reported out of committee by a 16–5 vote.

On January 3, 2019, her nomination was returned to the President under Rule XXXI, Paragraph 6 of the United States Senate. On April 8, 2019, President Trump announced the renomination of Rowland to the district court. On May 21, 2019, her nomination was sent to the Senate. On June 20, 2019, her nomination was reported out of committee by a 14–8 vote, with the majority of the Republican Senators on the committee voted “no”. On July 31, 2019, the Senate confirmed her nomination by voice vote. She received her judicial commission on August 20, 2019. She was sworn in on August 22, 2019.

== Affiliations and memberships ==
Rowland is a member of the Lesbian and Gay Bar Association of Chicago.

== See also ==
- List of LGBT jurists in the United States

Legal offices
Preceded by Amy St. Eve	Judge of the United States District Court for the Northern District of Illinois; 2019–present	Incumbent
