= Joan Lefkow =

American judge (born 1944)

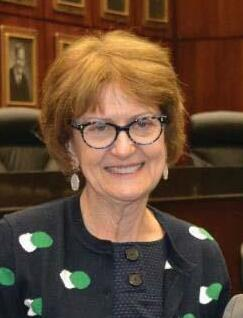
- Lefkow in 2019

Senior Judge of the United States District Court for the Northern District of Illinois
- Incumbent
- Assumed office September 1, 2012

Judge of the United States District Court for the Northern District of Illinois
- In office July 11, 2000 – September 1, 2012
- Appointed by: Bill Clinton
- Preceded by: Ann Claire Williams
- Succeeded by: Manish S. Shah

Bankruptcy Judge of the United States District Court for the Northern District of Illinois
- In office 1997–2000

Magistrate Judge of the United States District Court for the Northern District of Illinois
- In office 1982–1997

Personal details
- Born: Joan Marilyn Humphrey; January 8, 1944 (age 82) Nemaha County, Kansas, U.S.
- Spouse: Michael Lefkow (m. 1975; murdered 2005)
- Children: 5
- Education: Wheaton College (AB); Northwestern University (JD)

Joan Marilyn Humphrey Lefkow (née Humphrey; born January 8, 1944) is a senior United States district judge of the United States District Court for the Northern District of Illinois.

== Education and career ==
Lefkow was born in Nemaha County, Kansas. She attended Wheaton College in Illinois, where she received an Artium Baccalaureus degree, and obtained her Juris Doctor (J.D.) at Northwestern University School of Law in 1971. After graduation, she became a law clerk for Judge Thomas E. Fairchild of the United States Court of Appeals for the Seventh Circuit.

From 1972 to 1975, Lefkow was a staff attorney at the Legal Assistance Foundation of Chicago. After that, she served as an administrative law judge for the Illinois Fair Employment Practices Commission from 1975 to 1979. She was an instructor at University of Miami School of Law in 1980 and 1981 before becoming the executive director of the Cook County Legal Assistance Foundation from 1981 to 1982.

From 1982 to 1997 she was a United States magistrate judge, and from 1997 to 2000 a United States Bankruptcy Judge of the Northern District of Illinois.

=== Federal judicial service ===
Lefkow was nominated by President Bill Clinton on May 11, 2000, to a seat on the United States District Court for the Northern District of Illinois vacated by Judge Ann Claire Williams, and confirmed by the United States Senate on June 30, 2000. She received her commission on July 11, 2000. Lefkow assumed senior status on September 1, 2012.

=== Matthew Hale ===
In May 2000, Judge Lefkow presided over the enforcement of a high-profile trademark infringement case against the World Church of the Creator (WCOTC), an organization run by white supremacist leader Matthew F. Hale. The Oregon-based TE-TA-MA Truth Foundation—described by the Southern Poverty Law Center as "a peace-loving, multicultural church"—sued Hale's church for using the name "Church of the Creator." WCOTC argued against the validity of the suit because Hale's church had been using the name since 1973, but the Foundation had trademarked it in 1987, and no contest was filed against the trademark within a five-year period, making their ownership legally incontestable. In January 2002, Lefkow ruled in favor of Hale, but her decision was overturned on appeal. On July 25, Lefkow ruled against Hale, saying that his church infringed the Church of the Creator's trademark. (Hale's organization has since been renamed the Creativity Movement.)

An injunction was issued on November 19 forbidding Hale's church from using the term "Church of the Creator." Hale's World Church of the Creator was ordered to stop using the name on the Internet, and to remove or cover up the phrase "Church of the Creator" on all of Hale's publications and products. In response to this decision, Hale sued Lefkow on December 24, claiming that her order violated the Constitution in requiring the "destruction" of the group's bibles. At around the same time, threats were made against Lefkow on the Internet, and her home address, and family photographs of her husband and children, were posted on the Stormfront website.

Meanwhile, an undercover FBI informant, posing as Hale's "security" chief, taped a conversation with Hale where he asked about Lefkow's home address, and discussed her impending "extermination." On January 8, 2003, Hale was arrested on charges of plotting to murder Lefkow. The FBI informant in that trial received several death threats, and Lefkow initially was protected by a detail of the United States Marshals Service.

On April 24, Judge Lefkow ruled that the Creativity Movement had failed to stop using the name "World Church of the Creator," and should be fined $1,000 a day until it complied.

On April 6, 2005, Hale was sentenced to a 40-year prison term for soliciting the undercover FBI informant to kill Judge Lefkow. His conviction and sentence were affirmed in 2006. A subsequent application to void them, on grounds including ineffective assistance of counsel, was rejected, and his appeal from that decision was affirmed on March 5, 2013. In a separate proceeding, sympathizer Bill White was convicted and sentenced to prison for threatening the life of the foreman of the jury that convicted Hale in Judge Lefkow's courtroom, although the conviction was overturned on appeal.

== Double homicide at Lefkow's home ==
On February 28, 2005, Lefkow returned home to find the bodies of both her husband and mother in the basement of her home on the North Side of Chicago. According to an anonymous federal source, both Michael Francis Lefkow, 64, and Donna Grace Glenn Humphrey, 89, had been shot multiple times. The Cook County medical examiner's office stated that the victims were killed with .22 caliber shots to the head. No weapon was found at the scene, but two .22-caliber casings were recovered; evidence of a break-in was found as well. Initial suspicions focused on the possibility that hate groups were involved. On March 4, the FBI announced a $50,000 reward for information leading to the identification of anyone involved in the slayings.

On March 8, investigators announced that DNA samples had been obtained from a cigarette butt found inside the kitchen sink. Further evidence was recovered in and around the home, including a fingerprint, a bloody footprint, and a soda can. Lefkow and her children were again placed under the protection of the United States Marshals Service.

On May 18, 2005, Judge Lefkow testified before the U.S. Congress on the problem of providing security for judges, placing some of the blame for the attack on her family on rhetoric against judges issued by persons such as Pat Robertson. a radio host and FBI informant Hal Turner asserted in September of that year that comments of his (which called for Lefkow's death) may have inspired the murders.

=== Perpetrator ===
On March 10, 2005, the Chicago Police Department and federal agents announced a possible break in the case. According to investigators, a van was stopped during a traffic stop in West Allis, Wisconsin, at 6:00 p.m. on March 9. As West Allis police officer Rick Orlowski approached the vehicle, the driver, identified as 57-year-old Polish electrician Bart Allen Ross (born Bartłomiej Ciszewski), shot and killed himself. Later that night, a suicide note was found in the car, confessing to the murders of Lefkow's husband and mother, allegedly providing details about the crimes which would have been known only to the actual murderer. Ross had been a plaintiff in a medical malpractice case that Lefkow had dismissed. Investigators found over three hundred .22 caliber shells in the vehicle, casings of the same caliber that were found in the Lefkow home. DNA evidence from Ross allegedly matched the cigarette butt found in Lefkow's home. Ross sent a handwritten letter to WMAQ-TV describing breaking into the Lefkow home with a plan to kill the judge.

Financially stable, with a house, prior to contracting a rare mouth cancer, Ross underwent multiple surgeries and treatments. These completely cured his cancer, but left him massively disfigured, in constant pain, financially wiped out with deep debt, and living in his van. His attempts to sue the medical system may have been intended to jump-start the remainder of his life, but with no actual case of wrongdoing, they were inevitably dismissed.

Legal offices
Preceded by Ann Claire Williams	Judge of the United States District Court for the Northern District of Illinois; 2000–2012	Succeeded by Manish S. Shah
