= Cecil A. Partee =

American politician and attorney (1921-1994)

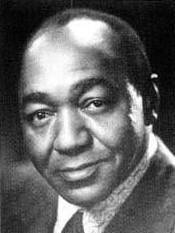
- official portrait, circa 1976

Cook County State's Attorney
- In office April 24, 1989 – December 1, 1990
- Preceded by: Richard M. Daley
- Succeeded by: Jack O'Malley

Chicago City Treasurer
- In office April 1979 – April 1989
- Preceded by: Joseph G. Bertand
- Succeeded by: Miriam Santos

President of the Illinois Senate
- In office January 8, 1975 – February 16, 1977
- Governor: James R. Thompson
- Preceded by: William Harris
- Succeeded by: Thomas Hynes

Member of the Illinois Senate from the 26th district
- In office January 4, 1967 – February 16, 1977
- Preceded by: David Davis IV
- Succeeded by: Harold Washington

Member of the Illinois House of Representatives
- In office 1957–1967

Personal details
- Born: Cecil Armillo Partee; April 10, 1921 Blytheville, Arkansas, U.S.
- Died: August 17, 1994 (aged 73) Chicago, Illinois, U.S.
- Party: Democratic
- Spouse: Paris
- Children: Two
- Education: Tennessee State University (B.A.); Northwestern University (J.D.)
- Profession: Attorney

Cecil Armillo Partee (April 10, 1921 – August 17, 1994) was an American attorney and politician. He was the first African American to serve as president of the Illinois Senate and the first to serve as Cook County State's Attorney. He served in both the Illinois House of Representatives and the Illinois State Senate. He also served three terms as City Treasurer of Chicago.

== Early life and education ==
Born in Blytheville, Arkansas, Partee received his bachelor's degree from Tennessee State University and his J.D. degree from Northwestern University School of Law in 1946.

== Political career ==
=== Illinois State House ===
He practiced law and was an assistant state's attorney. In 1956, he was elected to the Illinois House of Representatives as a Democrat. As a member of the House, he served on a special House committee on reapportionment, as chairman of an interim legislative committee that set up the Illinois Fair Employment Practices Commission, and as chairman of the House Elections Committee.

While in the House, Partee sponsored fair housing legislation. He was also a leader in pursuing fair employment practices legislation.

=== Illinois State Senate ===
In 1966, he was elected to the Illinois State Senate. In 1975, he was elected as President of the Illinois Senate, becoming the first black person to serve in that role and the first to head a state legislature anywhere in the United States since the end of Reconstruction.

He ran for Illinois Attorney General in 1976 and won the Democratic Party nomination, but lost the general election to Republican William Scott.

=== 20th Ward Committeeman ===
During the 1970s, Partee served as Democratic Party committeeman for Chicago's 20th ward. He was credited in his Chicago Tribune obituary for playing an important role in helping Harold Washington win a close election for State Representative while in this position.

=== City Treasurer of Chicago ===
In 1979, he successfully ran for City Treasurer of Chicago. He won re-election twice and served in the office until 1989.

=== Cook County State's Attorney ===
Partee was appointed State's Attorney for Cook County on April 24, 1989, when Richard M. Daley was elected Mayor of Chicago. He was the first black person to serve in this office, and the last until Kim Foxx won election in 2016. He lost a special election for the office to Republican nominee Jack O'Malley on November 6, 1990.

== Death ==
Partee died of lung cancer in Chicago on August 17, 1994.

Party political offices
Preceded by Thomas G. Lyons	Democratic nominee for Attorney General of Illinois; 1976	Succeeded by Richard J. Troy
