= William C. Harris (Illinois politician) =

American businessman and politician

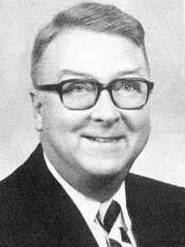
- official portrait, circa 1976

Illinois Commissioner of Banks and Trust Companies
- In office 1977–???
- Governor: Jim Thompson

President of the Illinois Senate
- In office January 10, 1973 – January 1975
- Preceded by: Cecil A. Partee
- Succeeded by: Cecil A. Partee

Member of the Illinois Senate
- In office 1961–1977

Member of the Illinois House of Representatives
- In office 1955–1961

Personal details
- Born: May 7, 1921 (age 105) Pontiac, Illinois, U.S.
- Died: December 30, 2004 (aged 83)
- Party: Republican

William C. Harris (May 7, 1921 – December 30, 2004) was an American businessman and politician.

== Biography ==
Born in Pontiac, Illinois, Harris served in the United States Navy during World War II. He then worked for his family's funeral home in Pontiac, Illinois and was in the insurance business. He served in the Illinois House of Representatives from 1955 to 1961 and was a Republican. Harris then served in the Illinois State Senate from 1961 to 1977. In 1968, Harris unsuccessfully ran for Auditor of Public Accounts. He was the president of the Illinois Senate during the 78th Illinois General Assembly. In 1976, he unsuccessfully ran for Illinois Secretary of State. In 1977, Harris was appointed Illinois Commissioner of Banks and Trust Companies.

== Notes ==
Party political offices
Preceded by Edmund J. Kucharski	Republican nominee for Secretary of State of Illinois; 1976	Succeeded by Sharon Sharp
