= Thomas G. Lyons =

American politician (1931–2007)

Tom Lyons
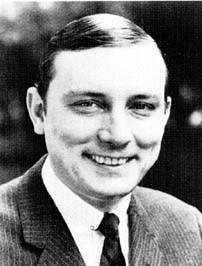
- Lyons, circa 1971

Chairman of the Cook County Democratic Party
- In office 1990–2007
- Preceded by: George Dunne
- Succeeded by: Joseph Berrios

Member of the Illinois Senate
- In office 1971–1973
- Preceded by: Walter Duda
- Succeeded by: Howard W. Carroll
- Constituency: 15th district
- In office 1965–1967
- Preceded by: Seymour Fox
- Succeeded by: Esther Saperstein (redistricted)
- Constituency: 10th district

Personal details
- Born: May 24, 1931 Chicago, Illinois
- Died: January 12, 2007 (aged 75) Chicago, Illinois
- Party: Democratic
- Spouse: Ruth Tobin
- Children: Four
- Education: Loyola University; Loyola Law School
- Profession: Attorney; Politician

Military service
- Allegiance: United States
- Branch/service: United States Army
- Years of service: 1954–1957

Thomas G. Lyons (May 24, 1931 – January 12, 2007) was an American politician and member of the Democratic Party active in Chicago.

== Biography ==
Lyons was born May 24, 1931, on the northwest side of Chicago. He attended Our Lady of Victory Grammar School and Campion High School. He attended college at Loyola University and earned a law degree from Loyola Law School. Lyons served in the United States Army Rangers 1954 through 1956. As of 1964, he was a Captain in the United States Army Reserve. Lyons joined the Chicago Police Department as a patrolman in 1953 and resigned in 1957 upon his admission to the Bar. During his legal career, he served as Chief of the Law Division of Cook County Assessor's Office, and chief of three departments in the Office of Attorney General of Illinois, and as a partner at O'Keefe, Ashenden, O'Brien, Hanson, Lyons & Associates. In 1958, Lyons married Ruth Tobin in Mitchell, South Dakota.

=== Illinois Senate ===
In 1964, Lyons was elected to the Illinois Senate from the 10th district defeating Republican candidate Elroy C. Sandquist Jr. He was chosen the best new member of the Illinois Senate in 1965 and selected by Rutgers University as an outstanding young legislator in 1966. Served as chairman of the Illinois Constitution Study Commission and Secretary of the Governor's Revenue Study Committee. Lyons lost re-election in 1966, in part for his support for a statewide fair housing laws, similar to what would become Titles VIII through IX of the Civil Rights Act of 1968.

Lyons was elected as a delegate to the Sixth Illinois Constitutional Convention of 1969-1970, and was unanimously elected to be a Vice President of the Convention. Lyons was elected to the Illinois Senate in 1970 from the 15th district and served another term in the Illinois Senate. Lyons left the Illinois Senate to run for Illinois Attorney General; losing to incumbent William J. Scott. Howard W. Carroll, a member of the Illinois House of Representatives, defeated former State Senator Walter Duda's comeback bid.

=== Post-Senate career ===
In 1968, Lyons was elected to the position of Democratic committeeman for the 45th ward, and from 1990 until his death he served as Chair of the Cook County Democratic Party from 1990 to 2007 and as 45th Ward Democratic committeeman for many years. President Bill Clinton appointed Lyons to the American Battle Monuments Commission.

=== Death ===
Lyons died on January 13, 2007 at the age of 66. He was succeeded as Chairman of the Cook County Democratic Party by Joe Berrios.

Party political offices
Preceded by Francis S. Lorenz	Democratic nominee for Attorney General of Illinois; 1972	Succeeded by Cecil A. Partee
Preceded by George Dunne	Chairman of the Cook County Democratic Party; 1990–2007	Succeeded by Joseph Berrios
Preceded by Walter Duda	Member of the Illinois Senate from the 15th district 1971–1973	Succeeded by Howard W. Carroll
Preceded by Seymour Fox	Member of the Illinois Senate from the 10th district 1965–1967	Succeeded by Esther Saperstein (redistricted)
