= President of the Illinois Senate =

Illinois Senate head

The president of the Illinois Senate is the presiding officer of the Illinois Senate, the upper house of the Illinois General Assembly. The post dates from the General Assembly's 32nd session, in 1881.

From 1881 to 1973, the lieutenant governor was constitutionally President of the Senate. The highest elected post in the chamber, until then, was known as president pro tempore, and presided over the body in the absence of the lieutenant governor. Since then, the Illinois Senate has elected its president from its membership. The president is sixth (behind the lieutenant governor, attorney general, secretary of state, comptroller, and treasurer, respectively) in the line of succession to the office of Governor of Illinois.

While the Illinois Constitution does not impose any term limits on legislators or constitutional officers, Senate Rules limit the President of the Senate and the Minority Leader of the Senate to five general assemblies, or ten years of service in that role. The Senate first adopted such rule during the 100th General Assembly.

The colors indicate the political party affiliation of each presiding officer.

== Presidents pro tempore ==
#	President	Party	General Assembly	Date of election
1	William J. Campbell	Republican	32nd	January 6, 1881
1	William J. Campbell	Republican	33rd	January 6, 1881
1	William J. Campbell	Republican	34th	January 6, 1881
2	August W. Berggren	Republican	35th	January 5, 1887
3	Theodore S. Chapman	Republican	36th	January 9, 1889
4	Milton W. Matthews	Republican	37th	January 7, 1891
5	John W. Coppinger	Democrat	38th	January 4, 1893
6	Charles Bogardus	Republican	39th	January 9, 1895
7	Hendrick V. Fisher	Republican	40th	January 6, 1897
8	Walter Warder	Republican	41st	January 4, 1899
9	John J. Brenholt	Republican	42nd	January 9, 1901
10	John C. McKenzie	Republican	43rd	January 7, 1903
11	Leon A. Townsend	Republican	44th	January 4, 1905
12	Orville F. Berry	Republican	44th	
13	Stanton C. Pemberton	Republican	45th	January 9, 1907
14	Robert S. Hamilton	Republican	46th	January 6, 1909
15	Henry M. Dunlap	Republican	47th	January 4, 1911
16	Walter I. Manny	Democrat	48th	January 22, 1913
17	Stephen D. Canady	Democrat	49th	January 6, 1915
18	Adam C. Cliffe	Republican	50th	January 3, 1917
18	Adam C. Cliffe	Republican	51st	January 3, 1917
19	William S. Jewell	Republican	52nd	January 5, 1921
20	Richard J. Barr	Republican	53rd	January 3, 1923
20	Richard J. Barr	Republican	54th	January 3, 1923
20	Richard J. Barr	Republican	55th	January 3, 1923
21	Martin R. Carlson	Republican	56th	January 9, 1929
22	Richard J. Barr	Republican	57th	January 7, 1931
23	Richey V. Graham	Democrat	58th	January 4, 1933
23	Richey V. Graham	Democrat	59th	January 4, 1933
24	George M. Maypole	Democrat	60th	January 6, 1937
24	George M. Maypole	Democrat	61st	January 6, 1937
25	Arnold P. Benson	Republican	62nd	January 8, 1941
25	Arnold P. Benson	Republican	63rd	January 8, 1941
26	Edward E. Laughlin	Republican	64th	January 3, 1945
26	Edward E. Laughlin	Republican	65th	January 3, 1945
27	Wallace Thompson	Republican	66th	January 10, 1949
27	Wallace Thompson	Republican	67th	January 10, 1949
28	Walker Butler	Republican	68th	January 7, 1953
29	Arthur J. Bidwill	Republican	69th	January 5, 1955
29	Arthur J. Bidwill	Republican	70th	January 5, 1955
29	Arthur J. Bidwill	Republican	71st	January 5, 1955
29	Arthur J. Bidwill	Republican	72nd	January 5, 1955
29	Arthur J. Bidwill	Republican	73rd	January 5, 1955
30	W. Russell Arrington	Republican	74th	January 6, 1965
30	W. Russell Arrington	Republican	75th	January 6, 1965
30	W. Russell Arrington	Republican	76th	January 6, 1965
31	Cecil A. Partee	Democrat	77th	January 6, 1971

== Presidents ==
#	President	Party	General Assembly	Date of election
32	William C. Harris	Republican	78th	January 10, 1973
33	Cecil A. Partee	Democrat	79th	January 8, 1975
34	Thomas C. Hynes	Democrat	80th	February 16, 1977
35	Philip J. Rock	Democrat	81st	January 10, 1979
35	Philip J. Rock	Democrat	82nd	January 10, 1979
35	Philip J. Rock	Democrat	83rd	January 10, 1979
35	Philip J. Rock	Democrat	84th	January 10, 1979
35	Philip J. Rock	Democrat	85th	January 10, 1979
35	Philip J. Rock	Democrat	86th	January 10, 1979
35	Philip J. Rock	Democrat	87th	January 10, 1979
36	James "Pate" Philip	Republican	88th	January 13, 1993
36	James "Pate" Philip	Republican	89th	January 13, 1993
36	James "Pate" Philip	Republican	90th	January 13, 1993
36	James "Pate" Philip	Republican	91st	January 13, 1993
36	James "Pate" Philip	Republican	92nd	January 13, 1993
37	Emil Jones, Jr.	Democrat	93rd	January 8, 2003
37	Emil Jones, Jr.	Democrat	94th	January 8, 2003
37	Emil Jones, Jr.	Democrat	95th	January 8, 2003
38	John Cullerton	Democrat	96th	January 14, 2009
38	John Cullerton	Democrat	97th	January 14, 2009
38	John Cullerton	Democrat	98th	January 14, 2009
38	John Cullerton	Democrat	99th	January 14, 2009
38	John Cullerton	Democrat	100th	January 14, 2009
38	John Cullerton	Democrat	101st	January 14, 2009
39	Don Harmon	Democrat	101st	January 19, 2020
39	Don Harmon	Democrat	102nd	January 19, 2020
39	Don Harmon	Democrat	103rd	January 19, 2020
39	Don Harmon	Democrat	104th	January 19, 2020

== See also ==
- List of Illinois state legislatures
