= 1968 Illinois gubernatorial election =

- November 5, 1968
- Turnout: 79.39% ▼4.76 pp
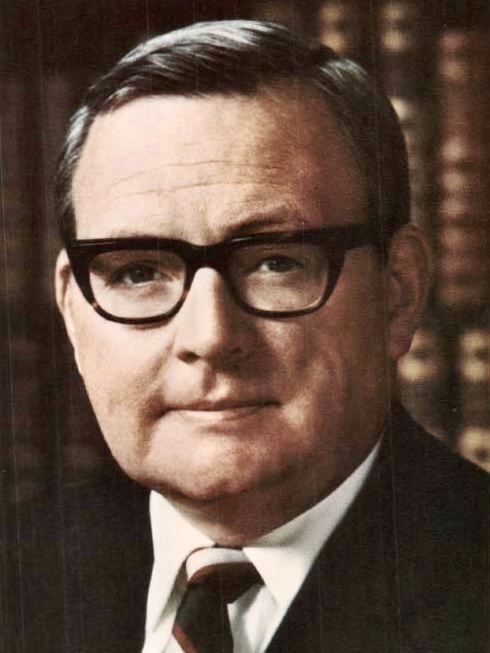

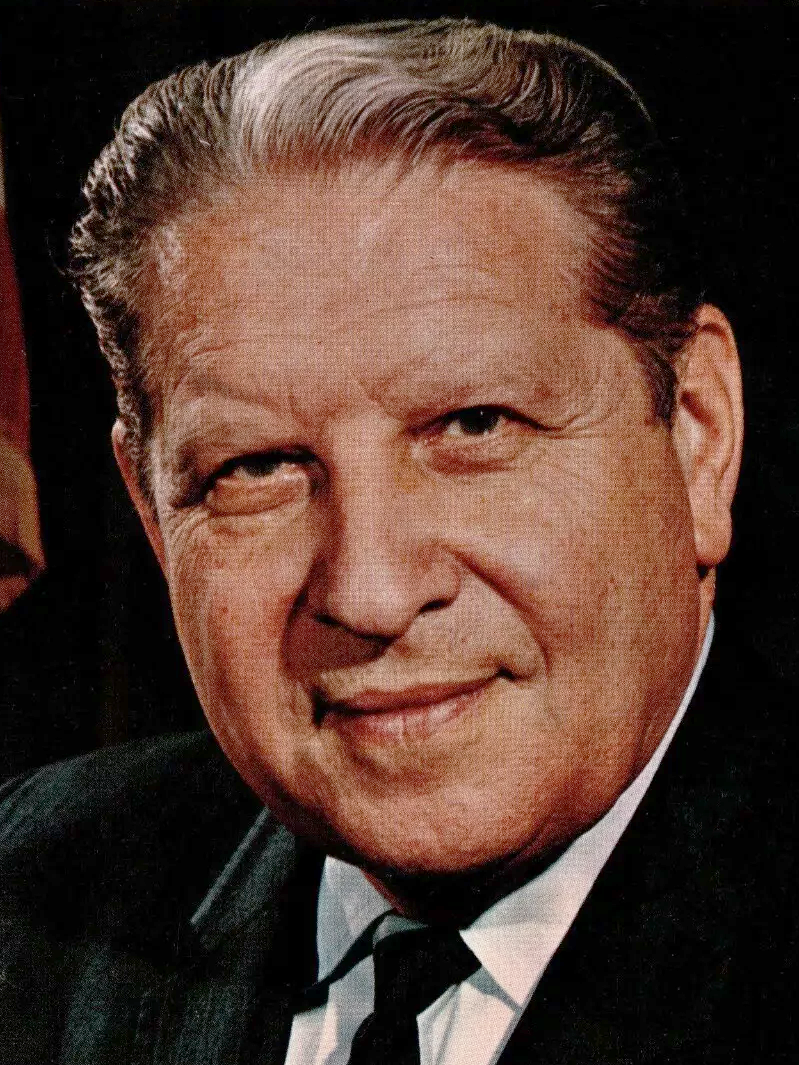
Nominee	Richard B. Ogilvie	Samuel H. Shapiro
Party	Republican	Democratic
Popular vote	2,307,295	2,179,501
Percentage	51.21%	48.37%
- County results Ogilvie: 40–50% 50–60% 60–70% 70–80% Shapiro: 40–50% 50–60%
Governor before election
Samuel H. Shapiro
Democratic
Elected Governor
Richard B. Ogilvie
Republican

The 1968 Illinois gubernatorial election was held in Illinois on November 5, 1968. Democratic nominee, incumbent governor Samuel H. Shapiro (who had assumed the governorship in May 1968, after Otto Kerner Jr. resigned in order to accept a judicial appointment), lost reelection to Republican nominee Richard B. Ogilvie, who was the president of the Cook County Board of Commissioners and former sheriff of Cook County.

== Background ==
The election coincided with those for federal offices (United States President, Senate, and House) and those for other state offices. The election was part of the 1968 Illinois elections.

The primaries were held on June 11, 1968.

In the primary, turnout was 24.44% with 1,332,832 votes cast. In the general election, turnout was 79.39% with 4,506,000 votes cast.

== Democratic primary ==
Governor Samuel H. Shapiro won renomination without opposition.

1968 Democratic gubernatorial primary, Illinois
Party	Candidate	Votes	%
Democratic	Samuel H. Shapiro (incumbent)	646,028	99.97
Write-in		204	0.03
Majority		645,824	99.94
Turnout		626,232	

== Republican primary ==
Ogilvie won the nomination against 1964 lieutenant gubernatorial candidate John Henry Altorfer, former Governor William G. Stratton, and S. Thomas Sutton.

=== Candidates ===
- John Henry Altorfer, 1964 lieutenant gubernatorial candidate
- Richard B. Ogilvie, president of the Cook County Board of Commissioners and former sheriff of Cook County
- William G. Stratton, former governor of Illinois
- S. Thomas Sutton

=== Results ===
1968 Republican gubernatorial primary, Illinois
Party	Candidate	Votes	%
Republican	Richard B. Ogilvie	335,727	47.51
Republican	John Henry Altorfer	288,904	40.89
Republican	William G. Stratton	50,041	7.08
Republican	S. Thomas Sutton	31,925	4.52
Write-in		3	0.00
Majority		46,823	6.63
Turnout		706,600	

== General election ==
Ogilive won 83 of the state's 102 counties. However, among the 19 counties Shapiro won was the state's most populous, Cook County.

1968 gubernatorial election, Illinois
Party	Candidate	Votes	%	±%
Republican	Richard B. Ogilvie	2,307,295	51.21	+3.13
Democratic	Samuel H. Shapiro (incumbent)	2,179,501	48.37	−3.56
Socialist Labor	Edward C. Gross	19,175	0.43	N/A
Write-in		29	0.00	N/A
Majority		127,794	2.84	6.69
Turnout		4,506,000	79.39	
Republican gain from Democratic		Swing		
