= George W. Lindberg =

American judge (1932–2019)

George Wakem Lindberg
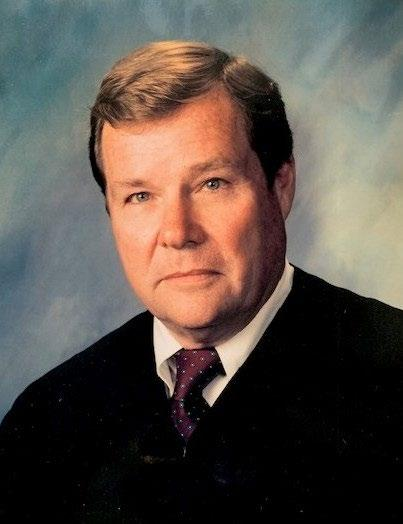
- judicial portrait photograph

Senior Judge of the United States District Court for the Northern District of Illinois
- In office June 21, 2001 – March 19, 2019

Judge of the United States District Court for the Northern District of Illinois
- In office November 6, 1989 – June 21, 2001
- Appointed by: George H. W. Bush
- Preceded by: Prentice Marshall
- Succeeded by: Amy St. Eve

1st Comptroller of Illinois
- In office 1973–1977
- Governor: Dan Walker
- Preceded by: Michael Howlett (as Auditor)
- Succeeded by: Michael Bakalis

Member of the Illinois House of Representatives
- In office 1967–1973

Personal details
- Born: George Wakem Lindberg; June 21, 1932 Crystal Lake, Illinois, U.S.
- Died: March 19, 2019 (aged 86)
- Party: Republican
- Education: Northwestern University (BS, JD)

George Wakem Lindberg (June 21, 1932 – March 19, 2019) was a United States district judge of the United States District Court for the Northern District of Illinois.

== Early life ==
Born in Crystal Lake, Illinois, Lindberg received his Bachelor of Science degree from Northwestern University in 1954 and his Juris Doctor from Northwestern University School of Law in 1957.

== Legal and political career ==
Lindberg was the vice president and legal counsel for John E. Reid and Associates in Chicago from 1955 to 1968, becoming an expert in financial fraud investigations. In 1966, Lindberg was elected to the first of three terms in the Illinois House of Representatives, serving until 1972. During his tenure in the General Assembly, Lindberg was a private practice attorney in the Chicago suburb of Crystal Lake in McHenry County from 1968 until 1973. While in the state legislature, he was the architect of the Illinois Governmental Ethics Act. His proposed legislation provided for campaign disclosures, but these provisions did not make the final bill passed by the General Assembly. Lindberg also served as chair of a special Illinois House committee investigating judicial misconduct, which resulted in the resignation of two Illinois Supreme Court justices.

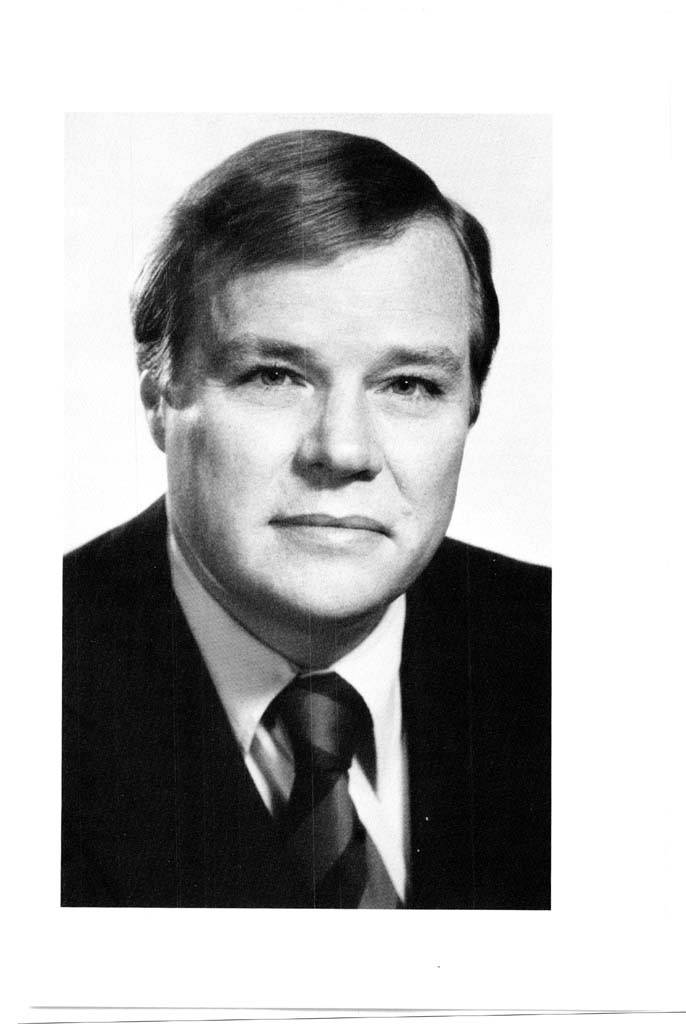
Lindberg in the 1970s

In 1972, Lindberg won election as the comptroller of Illinois and served until 1977. Lindberg's voluntary disclosure of personal political spending from his 1972 campaign—something he did every year as comptroller—was a first for an Illinois statewide-officeholder, and drew widespread praise. He was defeated for re-election in 1976 by Democrat Michael Bakalis.

After completing his term as comptroller, Lindberg was appointed Deputy State Attorney General for the state of Illinois, and served from 1977 to 1978 before winning election in 1978 as a judge in the Illinois Appellate Court representing the Second Judicial (Elgin) District. Ten years later, he was retained for a second ten-year term with 78% of the vote. He served on the appellate court until his appointment to the Federal Bench in 1989.

=== Election history ===
Year	Office	Election	Subject	Party	Votes	%	Opponent	Party	Votes	%
1976	Illinois Comptroller	General	George W. Lindberg (Inc.)	Republican	2,117,977	47.55	Michael Bakalis	Democratic	2,298,074	51.59
1972	Illinois Comptroller	General	George W. Lindberg	Republican	2,217,440	51.16	Dean Barringer	Democratic	2,094,798	48.33

== Federal judicial service ==
On the recommendation of Congressman Henry Hyde, Lindberg was nominated by President George H. W. Bush on September 21, 1989, to a seat on the United States District Court for the Northern District of Illinois vacated by Prentice Marshall. Lindberg was confirmed by the United States Senate on November 3, 1989, and received his commission on November 6, 1989. Lindberg assumed senior status on June 21, 2001 and assumed inactive senior status on December 31, 2012. He remained on senior status until his death on March 19, 2019.

== Notable clerks ==
Kathleen Zellner, noted for exonerating convicted prisoners, clerked for the judge.

== Sources ==
- Illinois Comptroller web site - History of the Office - Lindberg

Party political offices
First	Republican nominee for Illinois Comptroller; 1972, 1976	Succeeded by John W. Castle
Legal offices
Preceded by Prentice Marshall	Judge of the United States District Court for the Northern District of Illinois; 1989–2001	Succeeded by Amy St. Eve
Political offices
Preceded by Michael J. Howlett as Illinois Auditor of Public Accounts	Illinois Comptroller; 1973–1977	Succeeded by Michael Bakalis
