= Ann Claire Williams =

American judge (born 1949)

Ann Williams
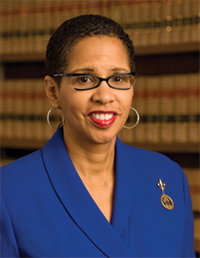

Senior Judge of the United States Court of Appeals for the Seventh Circuit
- In office June 5, 2017 – January 16, 2018

Judge of the United States Court of Appeals for the Seventh Circuit
- In office November 15, 1999 – June 5, 2017
- Appointed by: Bill Clinton
- Preceded by: Walter J. Cummings Jr.
- Succeeded by: Amy St. Eve

Judge of the United States District Court for the Northern District of Illinois
- In office April 4, 1985 – November 15, 1999
- Appointed by: Ronald Reagan
- Preceded by: Seat established
- Succeeded by: Joan Lefkow

Personal details
- Born: August 16, 1949 (age 77) Detroit, Michigan, U.S.
- Party: Independent
- Education: Wayne State University (BS); University of Michigan (MA); University of Notre Dame (JD)

Ann Claire Williams (born August 16, 1949) is an American judge who served as United States circuit judge of the United States Court of Appeals for the Seventh Circuit and a former United States District Judge of the United States District Court for the Northern District of Illinois. She is currently of counsel at Jones Day.

== Early life and education ==
Williams was born in Detroit, Michigan, to Dorothy and Joshua Williams, who were both public school teachers. She earned a Bachelor of Science degree from Wayne State University in elementary education and a Master of Arts in guidance and counseling from the University of Michigan. Williams taught in Detroit Public Schools students before attending law school. She received her Juris Doctor from Notre Dame Law School.

== Professional career ==
After law school, Williams worked as a law clerk for Judge Robert A. Sprecher of the United States Court of Appeals for the Seventh Circuit. She was one of the first two female African-American law clerks to work at that court. She then worked as an Assistant United States Attorney in Chicago for nine years, trying major felony cases and appearing before the Seventh Circuit. She was the first woman of color to serve as supervisor in that office and was promoted to deputy chief and chief of the criminal division. She became the first chief of the Organized Drug Enforcement Task Force in 1983, responsible for organizing federal investigation and prosecution activities for a five-state region. In 1979, Williams began serving as an adjunct professor and lecturer at Northwestern University School of Law and at John Marshall Law School. Later, as a judge, she continued teaching trial advocacy at Chicago area law schools and Harvard Law School. She has taught in more than 150 trial advocacy and deposition programs with the National Institute for Trial Advocacy (NITA) in the United States and Europe. Among her notable public interest law fellows was Jarrett M. Adams, an exoneree who served as her fellow after earning his J.D. from Loyola University Chicago School of Law in 2015. Adams later became the first exoneree ever hired as a staff attorney by the Innocence Project, and subsequently founded the Law Office of Jarrett Adams, PLLC and co-founded Life After Justice, a nonprofit dedicated to supporting exonerees.

== Federal judicial service ==
Williams was a United States district judge of the United States District Court for the Northern District of Illinois from 1985 until 1999. An Independent, President Ronald Reagan nominated her on March 13, 1985, to a newly created seat on the court, and she was confirmed by the Senate on April 3, 1985. She received her commission on April 4, 1985. Her confirmation made her the first woman judge of color appointed to serve on a district court in the three-state Seventh Circuit. Her service terminated on November 17, 1999, due to elevation to the court of appeals.

Still an independent, on August 5, 1999, President Bill Clinton nominated Williams to fill a vacancy on the United States Court of Appeals for the Seventh Circuit caused by the death of Judge Walter J. Cummings Jr. Williams was unanimously confirmed by the Senate in a voice vote on November 10, 1999, making her the first judge of color on the Seventh Circuit and the third woman of color to serve on any United States Court of Appeals. She received her commission on November 15, 1999. She assumed senior status on June 5, 2017, and retired on January 16, 2018.

In 2007, Williams dissented when the circuit held that failing to report to jail is itself a violent felony. Williams was mentioned by some media outlets as a possible choice for nomination to the Supreme Court to replace retiring Justice David Souter in 2009 and to replace Justice John Paul Stevens in 2010.

== Awards ==
Williams was awarded the 2008 Margaret Brent Women Lawyers of Achievement Award by the American Bar Association. In 2010, Williams became a recipient of the 28th Annual Edward J. Devitt Distinguished Service to Justice Award. It is awarded by the American Judicature Society to U.S. federal judges "whose careers have been exemplary, measured by their significant contributions to the administration of justice, the advancement of the rule of law, and the improvement of society as a whole."

== Political views ==
In an article in the Chicago Tribune on December 11, 1999, Williams declined to say whether she is a Republican or a Democrat, instead calling herself politically independent: "I've written on thousands of cases across the board, and I think it would be hard to type me," she said. "I don't think there is a type. I am not in Congress. We don't legislate in the courts." However, she also stated that she won't forget her roots or let her judicial robe "get in the way of my humanity".

== See also ==
- Barack Obama Supreme Court candidates
- List of African-American federal judges
- List of African-American jurists
- List of first women lawyers and judges in Illinois

Legal offices
| New seat | Judge of the United States District Court for the Northern District of Illinois; 1985–1999 | Succeeded by Joan Lefkow |
| Preceded by Walter J. Cummings Jr. | Judge of the United States Court of Appeals for the Seventh Circuit; 1999–2017 | Succeeded by Amy St. Eve |
