= Edward E. Laughlin =

American lawyer and politician

Edward E. Laughlin (July 27, 1887 – September 18, 1952) was an American lawyer and politician.

Born in Putnam County, Illinois, Laughlin went to the public schools in the Northern Illinois University College of Law. He was admitted to the Missouri bar in 1914 and the Illinois bar in 1916. He lived in Freeport, Illinois. From 1935 to 1937, Laughlin served in the Illinois House of Representatives and was a Republican. Laughlin then served in the Illinois State Senate from 1937 until his death in 1952. He served as president pro tempore of the senate. At the time of his death, Laughlin was not seeking re-election. Laughlin died in a hospital in Monroe, Wisconsin.
