= Richard B. Ogilvie =

Governor of Illinois from 1969 to 1973

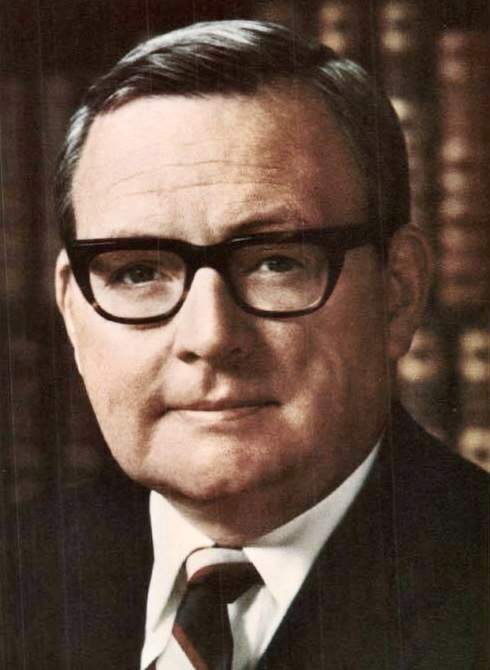
- Official portrait, c. 1969

35th Governor of Illinois
- In office January 13, 1969 – January 8, 1973
- Lieutenant: Paul Simon
- Preceded by: Samuel Shapiro
- Succeeded by: Dan Walker

President of the Cook County Board of Commissioners
- In office 1966–1969
- Preceded by: Seymour Simon
- Succeeded by: George Dunne

Sheriff of Cook County
- In office 1962–1966
- Preceded by: Frank G. Sain
- Succeeded by: Joseph I. Woods

Personal details
- Born: February 22, 1923 Kansas City, Missouri, U.S.
- Died: May 10, 1988 (aged 65) Chicago, Illinois, U.S.
- Party: Republican
- Spouse: Dorothy Shriver
- Profession: Attorney; Politician; Law enforcement officer
- Religion: Presbyterian
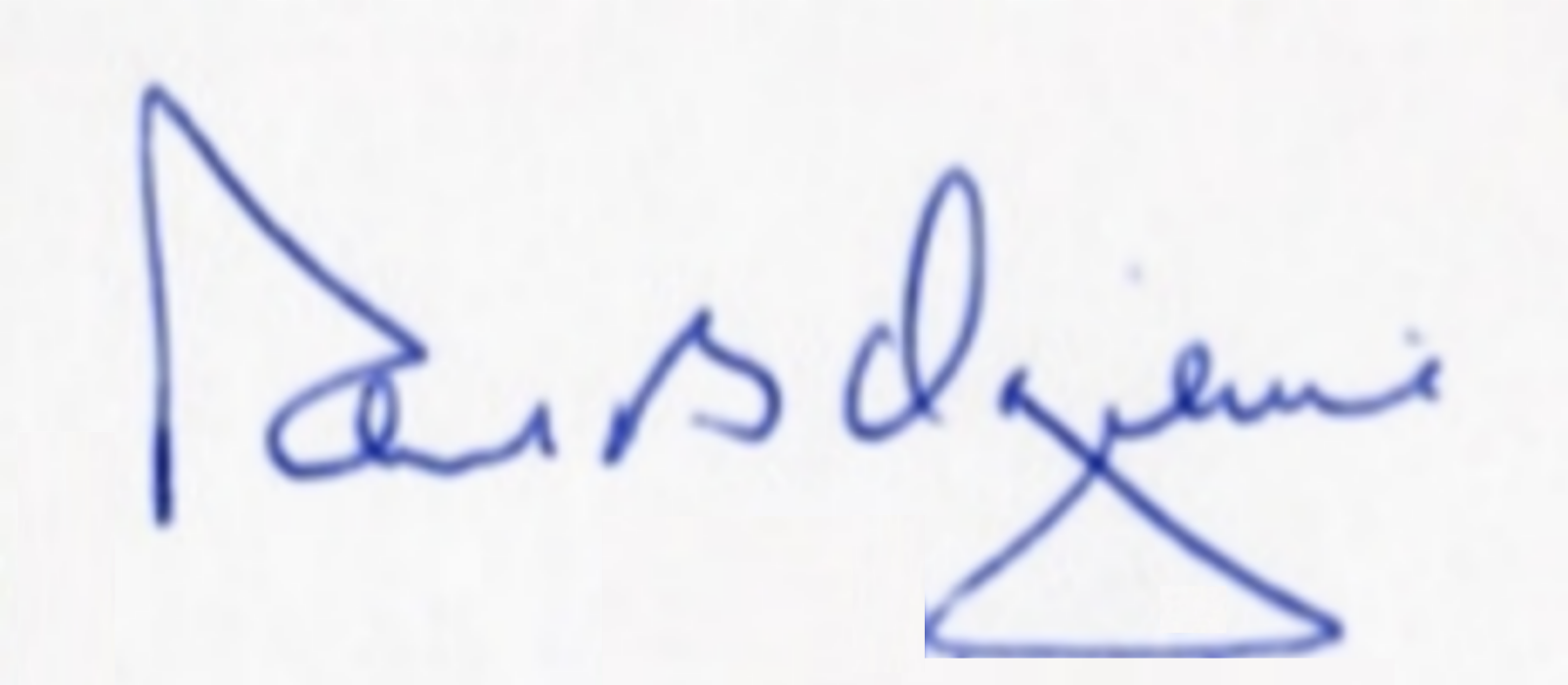
- Signature

Military service
- Allegiance: United States
- Branch/service: United States Army
- Years of service: 1942–1945
- Rank: Tank Commander
- Battles/wars: World War II

Richard Buell Ogilvie (February 22, 1923 – May 10, 1988) was an American attorney and law enforcement officer who served as the 35th governor of Illinois from 1969 to 1973. A wounded combat veteran of World War II, he became known as the mafia-fighting sheriff of Cook County, Illinois, in the 1960s before becoming governor.

== Education and military service ==
Ogilvie graduated from high school in Port Chester, New York, in 1940. While attending Yale University, he enlisted in the United States Army in 1942. As a tank commander in France, he was wounded and received the Purple Heart and two Battle Stars. Discharged in 1945, he resumed studies at Yale and in 1947, he earned a Bachelor of Arts majoring in American history. In 1949, he earned a Juris Doctor (J.D.) from Chicago-Kent College of Law. From 1950 to 1954, he practiced law in Chicago and served as an assistant United States Attorney from 1954 to 1955. From 1958 to 1961, he served as a special assistant to the United States Attorney General heading an office fighting organized crime in Chicago and the Chicago Mafia.

== Pre-gubernatorial political career ==
Ogilvie was elected sheriff of Cook County, Illinois' most populous county, in 1962; he served in this position until 1966. While sheriff, he was elected President of the Cook County Board of Commissioners and served from 1966 to 1969, when he resigned upon being elected Governor of Illinois. As of 2024, he was the last Republican to serve as the chief executive of Cook County. As sheriff, Ogilvie developed a reputation for fighting vice and his office led roughly 1,800 police raids during his tenure. This included the Fun Lounge police raid, which resulted in 109 arrests and is a notable event in the LGBT history of Chicago.

== Governor of Illinois ==
In 1968, he was elected governor as a Republican, with 51.2% of the vote, narrowly beating incumbent Democrat Sam Shapiro. His lieutenant governor was Democrat and future U.S. Senator Paul Simon, the only time that Illinois elected a Governor and Lt. Governor of different parties. (However, on at least two other occasions there was an acting Lt. Governor from a different party.)

Bolstered by large Republican majorities in the state house, Ogilvie modernized state government. He successfully advocated for a state constitutional convention, increased social spending, and secured Illinois' first state income tax. The latter was particularly unpopular with the electorate, and Ogilvie lost a close election to Daniel Walker in 1972, ending his career in elective office.

Ogilvie had many accomplishments during his term as governor. He proposed and successfully pushed for passage of the Illinois state income tax, a vital necessity for rescuing the state from a looming fiscal crisis. He created the Bureau of the Budget to ensure the governor's control of the state budgeting process, called for and obtained Illinois General Assembly approval for a record increase in state aid to public education.

Ogilvie campaigned vigorously for successful voter approval of the Illinois Constitution of 1970. He improved management of the Illinois State Fair, and in so doing eliminated irregularities in the handling of concession contracts. Ogilvie established the Illinois Department of Corrections to modernize the state penal system. He directed an expanded role for the Illinois Housing Development Authority, a key agency for combating urban decay. He also established the Illinois Department of Local Government Affairs to assist or advise county and municipal officials in the discharging of their duties. In addition, Ogilvie created the Illinois Department of Law Enforcement to revamp the state's policing functions; set up under the Illinois Bureau of Investigation, the state's "Little FBI". He broadened the scope of gubernatorial press conferences by allowing broadcast media to join the print media in coverage of the sessions. He also established the Illinois Environmental Protection Agency to protect air and water resources. One of the first comprehensive environmental protection agencies in the nation, the Illinois EPA became a model for the U.S. Environmental Protection Agency. Ogilvie set up the Illinois Department of Transportation, obtained legislative approval for a major upgrading of the state's highway network, and built the east–west toll road linking Chicagoland to Western Illinois.

At Governor Ogilvie's request, the General Assembly authorized an experimental junior college in East St. Louis—the State Community College—which did not require a local tax. Also, Ogilvie passed through the Illinois legislature and the City of St. Louis a bi-state airport authority. He significantly upgraded the Illinois Information Service, the state news agency, and revitalized the state General Services Agency.

== Post governorship ==
President Richard Nixon considered Ogilvie as a nominee to become Director of the Federal Bureau of Investigation.

In 1979, Governor Ogilvie was appointed as Trustee for the Milwaukee Road, a railroad that had entered bankruptcy. He oversaw its sale to the Soo Line Railroad, a U.S. division of the Canadian Pacific Railway.

Oglivie was the publisher of a revived Chicago Daily News in 1979, 18 months after its demise in 1978.

In 1987, he was appointed by then-Secretary of Transportation Elizabeth Dole to chair a committee studying the proposed termination of Amtrak's federal subsidy.

Until his death in 1988, he was a partner in the distinguished Chicago law firm of Isham Lincoln & Beale, one of whose founders was Abraham Lincoln's son, Robert Todd Lincoln.

== Death and legacy ==
After his death in Chicago on May 10, 1988, Governor Ogilvie was cremated and interred in Rosehill Mausoleum, Rosehill Cemetery, Chicago.

In 1997, Chicago & North Western Station, the downtown terminus for Metra commuter trains to many of Chicago's northern and western suburbs, was renamed Ogilvie Transportation Center in his honor, two years after the C&NW's assets have been purchased and incorporated into Union Pacific. The modern railroad station uses the former C&NW trainshed. Wisconsin Central Ltd. also had an EMD SD45 locomotive named in his honor (WC 7513). Ogilvie had been a longtime supporter of rail transport, and had created the Regional Transportation Authority, Metra's parent agency.

== Awards ==
Richard B. Ogilvie was inducted as a Laureate of The Lincoln Academy of Illinois and awarded the Order of Lincoln (the State's highest honor) by the Governor of Illinois in 1973 in the area of Government.

== In popular culture ==
Ogilvie is referenced in the news broadcast that serves as a backdrop for Simon & Garfunkel's "7 O'Clock News/Silent Night," which reports that Ogilvie, in his position as Cook County Sheriff, asked Martin Luther King Jr. to call off an open-housing march in the Chicago suburb of Cicero. The track was conceived by musician Paul Simon, who coincidentally shares his name with the man who served as lieutenant governor of Illinois under Ogilvie's gubernatorial tenure and later represented Illinois in the U.S. Senate.

In the first-season episode "Home Again" of the alternate history science fiction TV series For All Mankind, Ogilvie is referenced as being the governor of Illinois in 1974 and that his support for the Equal Rights Amendment plays a role in the state's ratification of it.

Party political offices
Preceded by Charles H. Percy	Republican nominee for Governor of Illinois; 1968, 1972	Succeeded by James R. Thompson
Political offices
Preceded by Seymour Simon	Cook County Board President; 1966–1969	Succeeded by George Dunne
Preceded by Samuel H. Shapiro	Governor of Illinois; 1969–1973	Succeeded by Daniel Walker
