= Dan Walker (politician) =

Governor of Illinois from 1973 to 1977

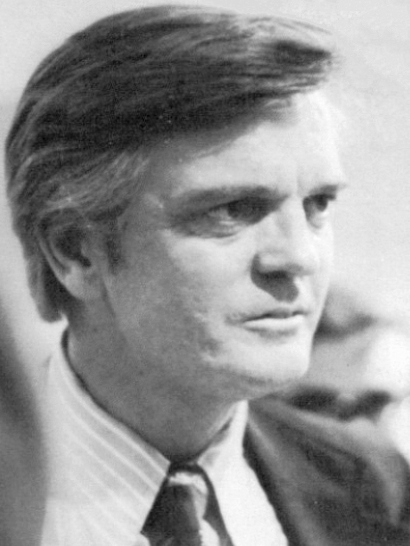
- Walker in 1974

36th Governor of Illinois
- In office January 8, 1973 – January 10, 1977
- Lieutenant: Neil Hartigan
- Preceded by: Richard B. Ogilvie
- Succeeded by: Jim Thompson

Personal details
- Born: August 6, 1922 Washington, D.C., U.S.
- Died: April 29, 2015 (aged 92) Chula Vista, California, U.S.
- Party: Democratic
- Spouses: Roberta Dowse (m. 1947; div. 1977) Roberta Nelson (m. 1979; div. 1989) Lillian Stewart (m. 1996)
- Children: 8
- Education: United States Naval Academy (BS); Northwestern University (JD)

Military service
- Allegiance: United States
- Branch/service: United States Navy
- Years of service: 1940–1941; 1945–1947; 1951
- Battles/wars: World War II; Korean War
- Criminal information
- Criminal information
- Status: Medical release
- Convictions: Bank fraud; Perjury; Filing false financial statements
- Penalty: Served 18 months of a seven-year sentence

Signature
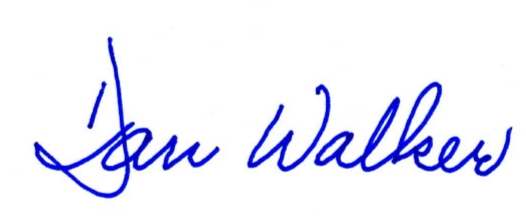

Daniel J. Walker (August 6, 1922 – April 29, 2015) was an American lawyer, businessman, and politician. A member of the Democratic Party, he served as the 36th governor of Illinois, from 1973 until 1977.

Walker was raised in San Diego, California, serving in the U.S. Navy as an enlisted man and officer during World War II and the Korean War. He moved to Illinois between the wars to attend Northwestern University School of Law, entering politics in the state during the 1960s.

A populist Democrat who opposed Chicago mayor Richard J. Daley's political machine, Walker ran for governor of Illinois in 1972. Notably walking 1,197 miles (1,926 km) across the state during the campaign, Walker won the Democratic primary in an upset against the machine's candidate, Lieutenant Governor Paul Simon. He went on that year to narrowly defeat the Republican incumbent, Richard B. Ogilvie, but lost his own bid for re-election in the 1976 primary against Secretary of State Michael Howlett, who lost the general election by a landslide.

His post-political career was marked by high living, but marred by convictions for bank fraud and perjury at the peak of the late 1980s savings and loan crisis. After a year and a half in federal prison, Walker retired to the San Diego metro area and wrote several books before he died in 2015.

== Early life and career ==
Walker was born in Washington, D.C., the son of Virginia May (Lynch) and Lewis Wesley Walker, who were both from Texas. He was raised in San Diego, California, and was valedictorian when he graduated from San Diego High School in 1940. He joined the U.S. Naval Reserve while still in high school, serving on a four pipe destroyer during the summers. His college plans at San Diego State College were interrupted when he was called to active duty in 1940 and served as an enlisted man on a minesweeper out of Point Loma, San Diego.

In 1941, he took an exam to become an officer, ranking fifth out of over three thousand that were tested. He was attending the Naval Academy Preparatory School in Norfolk when Pearl Harbor was attacked. He graduated the United States Naval Academy in 1946 and was later the second governor of Illinois to graduate from Annapolis. After that, he served as a naval officer near the end of World War II.

Walker moved to Illinois to attend Northwestern in 1947. He was recalled to the Navy during the Korean War and was communications officer on USS Kidd (DD-661). A 1950 graduate of the Northwestern University School of Law, Walker served as a law clerk for Chief Justice of the United States Fred M. Vinson, and as an aide to Illinois Governor Adlai Stevenson II. Walker later became an executive for Montgomery Ward while supporting reform politics in Chicago. In 1970, Walker was campaign chairman for the successful U.S. Senate campaign of Adlai Stevenson III (son of Adlai II).

The National Commission on the Causes and Prevention of Violence appointed Walker to head the Chicago Study Team that investigated the violent clashes between police and protesters at the 1968 Democratic National Convention. In December, the team issued its report, Rights in Conflict, better known as the Walker Report. The Report became highly controversial, and its author well-known. The report stated that while protesters had deliberately harassed and provoked police, the police had responded with indiscriminate violence against protesters, journalists, and bystanders, which Walker described as a "police riot". The Report charged that many police had committed criminal acts, and condemned the failure to prosecute or even discipline those police.

== Governor of Illinois ==
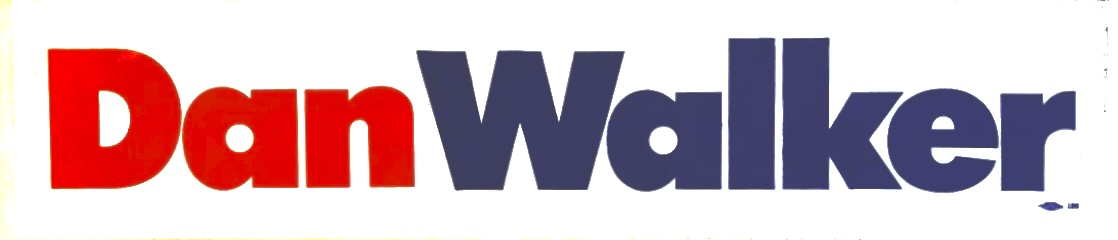
A bumper sticker from Walker's 1972 campaign featuring his logotype

A county map of the 1972 Illinois Democratic gubernatorial primary Walker: 50–60% 60–70% 70–80% Simon: 50–60% 60–70% 70–80% 80–90%

Walker announced his candidacy for Governor of Illinois in 1971 and attracted wide attention by walking 1,197 miles (1,926 km) across Illinois in 1971. At this time he was the General Counsel of Montgomery Ward and Company, a position he had for over 5 years. During his campaign, Montgomery Ward & Company continued to pay him. They paid him $200,000 per year (equal to $2,000,000 in 2020 dollars.) He also employed his administrative assistant, working on his campaign, who was also paid by Montgomery Ward. Montgomery Ward hoped that this political support would yield benefits when Walker became governor. This never materialized.

Walker's political platform was to stop the proposed Crosstown Expressway in Chicago. This was to run north–south, along Cicero Avenue and had been part of the State of Illinois Transportation plan since the 1950s. This expressway would have had 1 billion dollars of federal funding (10 billion in 2020 dollars). Walker received campaign funds from the Archdiocese of Chicago to stop this Expressway because it would have affected two of the most profitable parishes at the north end at Cicero and the Kennedy expressway.

When Walker was elected, he stopped the Illinois Department of Transportation from pursuing this expressway project. This was a direct political strike against Mayor Daley, who did not support Walker. He narrowly won the 1972 Democratic primary against then-Lieutenant Governor Paul Simon. Though Simon had a "good government" reputation, Walker attacked Simon for soliciting and accepting the endorsement of the Cook County Democratic Party chaired by Chicago Mayor Richard J. Daley, which Walker charged reflected servility to the "Daley Machine". In the 1972 general election, he defeated incumbent Republican Richard B. Ogilvie by a 51% to 49% margin. In the early 1970s, Walker was discussed as a possible presidential candidate.

A county map of the 1976 Illinois Democratic gubernatorial primary Howlett: 50–60% 60–70% Walker: 50–60% 60–70% 70–80% 80–90%

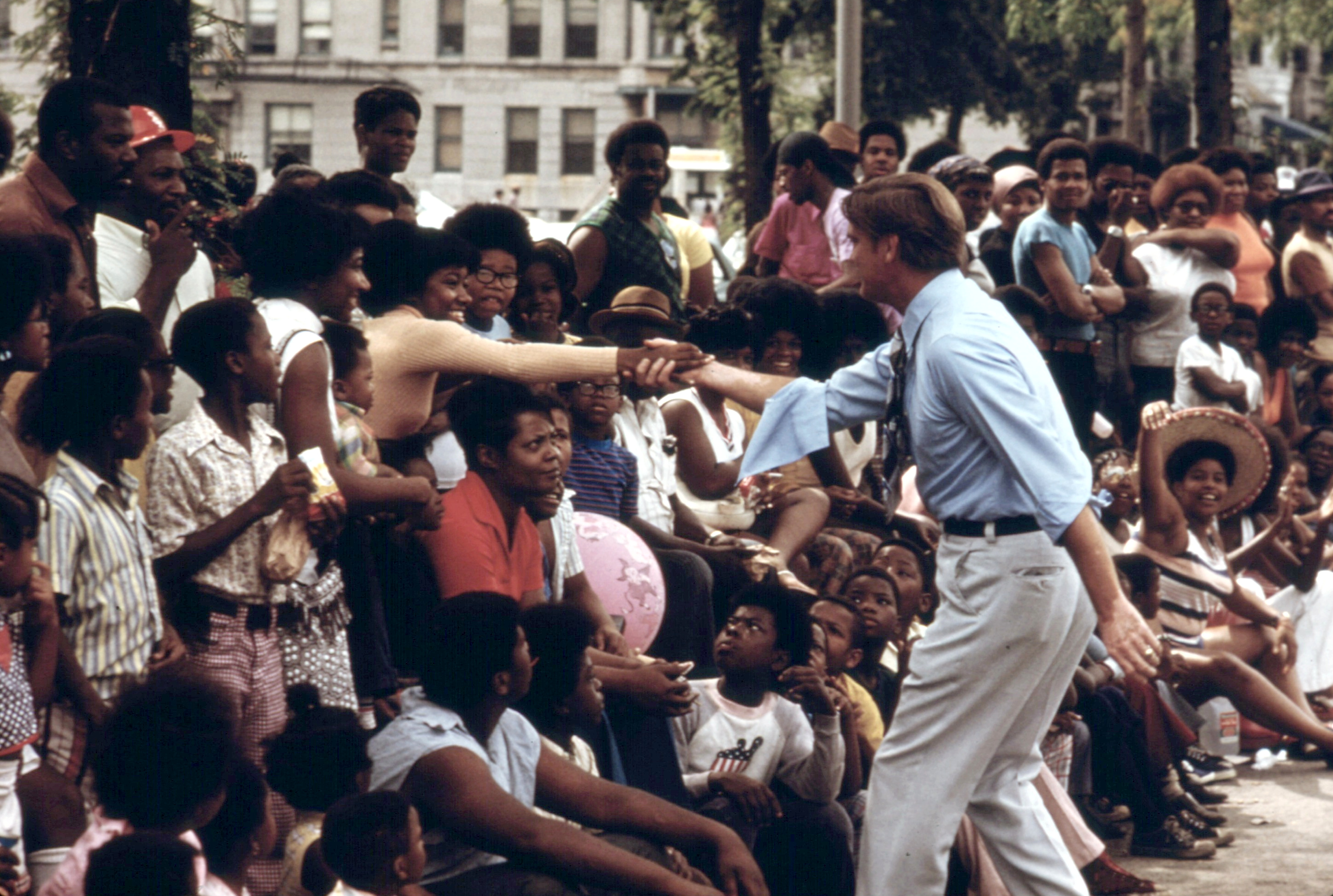
Walker at Bud Billiken Parade in 1973. Photo by John H. White.

The enmity between Walker and Chicago Mayor Richard J. Daley's political organization was deep. In 1974, Walker supported state legislative candidates against Daley allies. Walker's deputy governor, Victor deGrazia, later said: "I knew from the beginning that every time Daley looked at Walker, he saw the Church of England and the British suppression of the Irish, and when Dan would look at Daley, he would see the quintessential politician who was only interested in political gain."

"We never established anything even approaching a personal rapport. To some degree, this was an obvious and natural result of my independent political activity. But it went deeper – much deeper," said Walker. During his tenure, Walker was often at odds with both Republicans and Democrats in the state legislature. He did obtain passage of the first law requiring disclosure of campaign contributions and issued a series of executive orders prohibiting corrupt practices by state employees.

In 1976, Walker was defeated in the Democratic primary, losing to Illinois Secretary of State Michael Howlett, the candidate supported by Mayor Daley, by a 54% to 46% margin. In the general election, Howlett was overwhelmingly defeated by former United States Attorney James R. Thompson. A Democrat would not serve as governor of the state for the next 26 years, when Rod Blagojevich was elected in 2002.

== Post-governorship ==
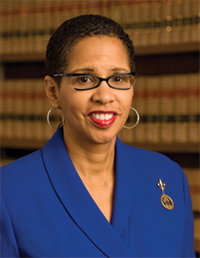
U.S. District Judge Ann Williams who sentenced Walker

In the 1980s, Walker reentered the private sector by forming Butler-Walker, Inc, a chain of self-named quick oil change franchises later bought by Jiffy Lube, and acquiring two savings and loan associations, one of which was First American Savings and Loan Association of Oak Brook which would later be declared insolvent. In 1987, Walker was charged with Federal bank fraud based on two loans. A private contractor borrowed $279,000 from First American to build schools.

Walker later personally borrowed $45,000 from that individual on a "handshake" basis. Those two loans, "borrowing from a borrower" while serving as a director, constituted bank fraud. Walker agreed to a plea bargain with Federal prosecutors. He pleaded guilty to bank fraud in the loan, perjury (based on dealings by the Association with his son), and filing false financial statements.

He was sentenced to four years imprisonment for bank fraud, three years for perjury, and probation for false financial statements; the sentences to be served consecutively. At his sentencing, U.S. District Judge Ann Williams stated, "It's clear to this court that a pattern was established and that you, Mr. Walker, thought this bank was your own personal piggy bank to bail you out whenever you got into trouble."

The U.S. Attorney General ruled that "borrowing from a borrower", which was Walker's main offense, was a violation of the regulations but not a violation of law. In 1987, news media reported Walker received over a million dollars in fraudulent loans for his business and repairs on his yacht Governor's Lady. As part of a plea agreement, no charges were laid against Walker for any other loans, and no other loans by First American were described as fraudulent.

Walker served eighteen months of his seven-year sentence. He was released in 1989 after his attorneys cited his failing health. Judge Williams ordered him released from prison based on "time served" and placed on probation until the two loans in question were repaid. This order eliminated the two other charges.

During the mid-1980s Savings and loan crisis, First American was declared insolvent and taken over by the Federal Savings and Loan Insurance Corporation (FSLIC). It continued in business as before, run by individuals brought in by FSLIC. There were no bondholders of First American and Walker and his wife were the only stockholders. When the two loans described above were repaid, Walker was released from probation and the case against him was closed. There was no cost to taxpayers for his specific loans, but in 1989, First American and another Chicago area S&L were bailed out by tax payers for just under $80 million. First American had $22.2 million in negative equity at that point.

Walker became the second of four Governors of Illinois in the 20th and 21st centuries to be convicted on federal criminal charges. The others were Otto Kerner Jr., George Ryan, and Rod Blagojevich. Unlike Kerner, Ryan, and Blagojevich, Walker's crimes were not related to his term as governor.

== Later life and death ==
After his release from prison in 1989, Walker returned to San Diego, where he spent most of his childhood. He found work as a paralegal. Walker also began writing. In 2003, he was writing for six hours a day and had several writing projects in the works, including a cookbook for couples. By 2007, he had written several books, and published at least three.

In January 2001, Walker requested a pardon from outgoing President Bill Clinton, but his request was not granted. In 2007, he published The Maverick and the Machine, in which he discussed his political career, his experiences in prison, and his business and law troubles. Of the latter, he wrote "I knew this was against regulations, but, like most businessmen, I saw a huge difference between a law and a regulation." After his plea deal was reached in 1987, Walker stated, "I have broken the law and pleaded guilty, I have deep regrets and no excuses." Walker died on April 29, 2015, at a veterans hospital in Chula Vista, California, from heart failure, aged 92.

== Personal life ==
Walker was married in 1947 to Roberta Dowse, a Catholic school teacher from Kenosha, Wisconsin. They had seven children, three boys—Daniel Jr., Charles, and William—and four girls, Kathleen, Julie, Roberta, and Margaret. They were divorced in 1977 after 30 years of marriage, when he left her for another woman.

Walker later admitted that the breakdown of the marriage and the divorce was primarily his fault, caused by his stubbornness, arrogance, and lust, and apologized for the pain it caused his family. He also called the divorce the worst decision of his life. Roberta Dowse-Walker, the former First Lady of Illinois, died in December 2006 from colon cancer. Walker later married Roberta Nelson, who was 14 years his junior, and was divorced in 1989 while he was in prison.

In 2007 he resided in Escondido, California, with his third wife, Lillian Stewart. In 2007, they adopted a son. As of 2007, he resided in Rosarito Beach, Baja California, Mexico.

== See also ==
- List of law clerks for the chief justice of the United States
- 1972 Illinois gubernatorial election

Party political offices
Preceded by Sam Shapiro	Democratic nominee for Governor of Illinois; 1972	Succeeded by Michael Howlett
Political offices
Preceded by Richard Ogilvie	Governor of Illinois; January 8, 1973 – January 10, 1977	Succeeded by James Thompson
