= 1978 Illinois gubernatorial election =

- November 7, 1978
- Turnout: 54.23% ▼19.95 pp
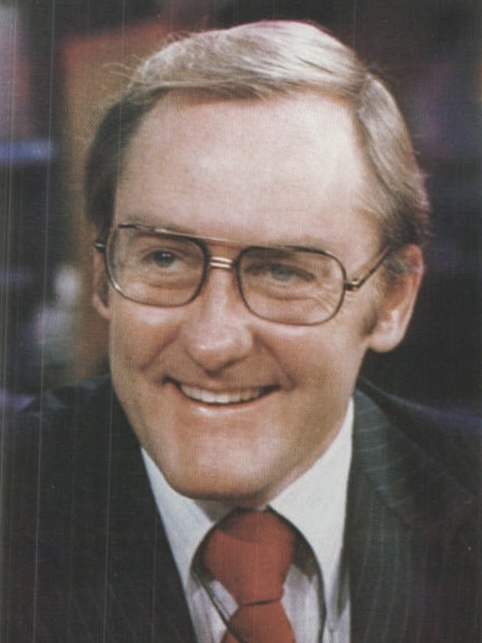

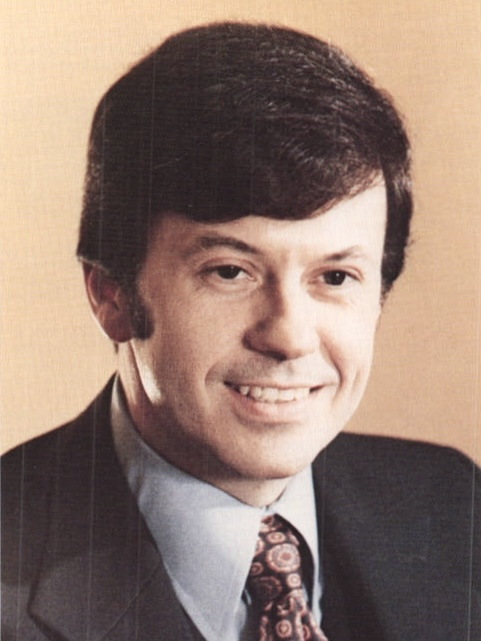
Nominee	Jim Thompson	Michael Bakalis
Party	Republican	Democratic
Running mate	Dave O'Neal	Dick Durbin
Popular vote	1,859,684	1,263,134
Percentage	59.04%	40.10%
- County results Thompson: 50–60% 60–70% 70–80% Bakalis: 40–50% 50–60%
Governor before election
James R. Thompson
Republican
Elected Governor
James R. Thompson
Republican

The 1978 Illinois gubernatorial election was held on Tuesday, November 7, 1978. Republican James R. Thompson easily won a second term in office, defeating Democratic nominee Michael Bakalis by 596,550 votes.

== Background ==
This was the first Illinois gubernatorial election that took place during the United States' midterm elections. The previous election had been in 1976.

The primary (held March 21) and general election coincided with those for federal offices (Senate and House) and those for other state offices. The election was part of the 1978 Illinois elections.

Turnout in the primaries saw 20.39% in the gubernatorial primaries, with a total of 1,201,603 votes cast, and 16.33% in the lieutenant gubernatorial primary, with 962,288 votes cast. Turnout during the general election was 54.23%, with 3,150,107 votes cast.

== Democratic primary ==
=== Governor ===
Incumbent Illinois Comptroller Michael Bakalis won the Democratic primary.

Bakalis' opponent had been Dakin Williams, a prosecutor who was the younger brother of famous playwright Tennessee Williams. Williams had been a candidate for the Democratic nomination of Illinois' US Senate seat in 1972, and had unsuccessfully sought the nomination for the state's other US Senate seat in 1974.

Democratic gubernatorial primary
Party	Candidate	Votes	%
Democratic	Michael Bakalis	601,045	82.85
Democratic	Dakin Williams	124,406	17.15
Write-in		8	0.00
Total votes		725,459	100

=== Lieutenant governor ===
Lawyer and future congressman and U.S. Senator Dick Durbin won the Democratic primary for lieutenant governor, running unopposed.

Democratic lieutenant gubernatorial primary
Party	Candidate	Votes	%
Democratic	Richard J. Durbin	528,819	100
Write-in		5	0.00
Total votes		528,824	100

== Republican primary ==
=== Governor ===
Incumbent governor James R. Thompson won renomination, running unopposed.

Republican gubernatorial primary
Party	Candidate	Votes	%
Republican	James R. Thompson (incumbent)	476,043	99.98
Write-in		101	0.02
Total votes		476,144	100

=== Lieutenant governor ===
Incumbent lieutenant governor Dave O'Neal won renomination, running unopposed.

Republican lieutenant gubernatorial primary
Party	Candidate	Votes	%
Republican	David C. O'Neal	433,453	100
Write-in		11	0.00
Total votes		433,464	100

== Results ==
1978 gubernatorial election, Illinois
Party	Candidate	Votes	%
Republican	James R. Thompson (incumbent)/ David C. O'Neal (incumbent)	1,859,684	59.04
Democratic	Michael Bakalis/ Richard J. Durbin	1,263,134	40.10
Libertarian	Georgia Shields/ Marji Kohls	11,420	0.36
Socialist Workers	Cecil Lampkin/ Dennis Brasky	11,026	0.35
U.S. Labor	Melvin Klenetsky/ David R. Hoffman	4,737	0.15
Write-in		106	0.00
Majority		596,550	18.94
Turnout		3,150,107	54.23
Republican hold			
