= Illinois News Network =

Illinois News Network may refer to:

- Illinois News Network, a radio network owned by Alex Seith and Thom Serafin in the 1980s
- Illinois News Network, a wire service division of Franklin Center for Government and Public Integrity
