= 1978 Illinois elections =

- November 7, 1978
- Turnout: 57.55%

Elections were held in Illinois on Tuesday, November 7, 1978.

Primaries were held on March 21, 1978.

This was the first election that the 1970 Constitution of Illinois' change took effect that all statewide executive offices would be elected in national midterm years.

== Election information ==
1978 was a midterm election year in the United States.

This was the first election that the 1970 Constitution of Illinois' change took effect that all statewide executive offices would be elected in national midterm years. To accommodate this, in 1976, all statewide executive offices that were up for election were elected to two-year terms that would expire following the 1978 elections.

=== Turnout ===
Turnout in the primary election was 25.14%, with a total of 1,482,034 ballots cast. 911,290 Democratic and 570,744 Republican primary ballots were cast.

Turnout during the general election was 57.55%, with 3,342,985 ballots cast.

== Federal elections ==
=== United States Senate ===
Incumbent Republican Charles H. Percy was reelected to a third term.

=== United States House ===
All 24 Illinois seats in the United States House of Representatives were up for election in 1978. The Republican Party flipped one seat, leaving the composition of Illinois' House delegation to consist of 13 Republicans and 11 democrats.

== State elections ==
=== Governor and Lieutenant Governor ===
1978 Illinois gubernatorial election
- November 7, 1978
- Turnout: 54.23%
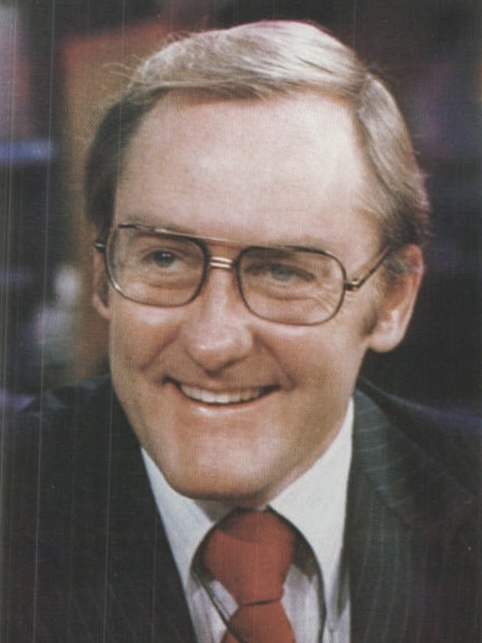

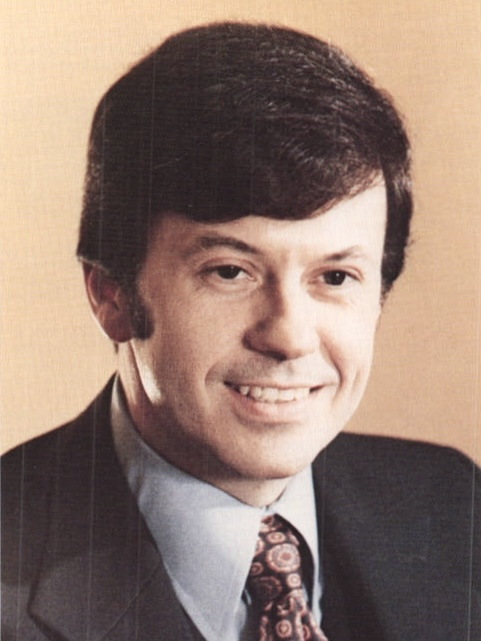
Nominee	James R. Thompson	Michael Bakalis
Party	Republican	Democratic
Running mate	David C. O'Neal	Dick Durbin
Popular vote	1,859,684	1,263,134
Percentage	59.0%	40.1%
- County Results Thompson: 50-60% 60-70% 70-80% Bakalis: 40–50% 50–60%
Governor before election
James R. Thompson
Republican
Elected Governor
James R. Thompson
Republican

Incumbent Governor James R. Thompson and Lieutenant Governor David C. O'Neal, Republicans, jointly won reelection to a second term.

1978 gubernatorial election, Illinois
Party	Candidate	Votes	%
Republican	James Thompson / Dave O'Neal (incumbents)	1,859,684	59.04
Democratic	Michael Bakalis / Dick Durbin	1,263,134	40.10
Libertarian	Georgia Shields	11,420	0.36
Socialist Workers	Cecil Lampkin	11,026	0.35
U.S. Labor	Melvin Klenetsky	4,737	0.15
Write-in	Others	106	0.00
Total votes		3,150,107	

=== Attorney General ===
1978 Illinois Attorney General election
- November 7, 1978
- Turnout: 52.85%
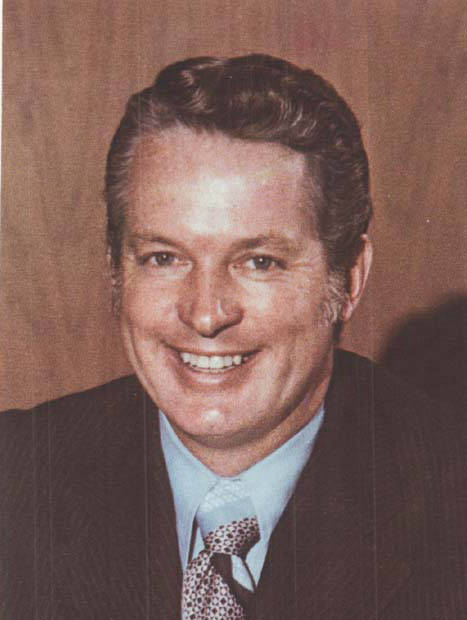

Nominee	William J. Scott	Richard J. Troy
Party	Republican	Democratic
Popular vote	1,989,758	1,050,085
Percentage	64.81%	34.20%
- County results Scott: 50–60% 60–70% 70–80% 80–90% Troy: 40–50% 50–60%
Attorney General before election
William J. Scott
Republican
Elected Attorney General
William J. Scott
Republican

Incumbent Attorney General William J. Scott, a Republican, was elected to a fourth term.

==== Democratic primary ====
Richard J. Troy, a Commissioner of the Metropolitan Water Reclamation District of Greater Chicago, won the Democratic primary, running unopposed.

Attorney General Democratic primary
Party	Candidate	Votes	%
Democratic	Richard J. Troy	538,632	100
Write-in	Others	24	0.01
Total votes		538,656	100

==== Republican primary ====
Incumbent William J. Scott won the Republican primary, running unopposed.

Attorney General Republican primary
Party	Candidate	Votes	%
Republican	William J. Scott (incumbent)	444,505	100
Write-in	Others	35	0.01
Total votes		444,540	100

==== General election ====
Attorney General election
Party	Candidate	Votes	%
Republican	William J. Scott (incumbent)	1,989,758	64.81
Democratic	Richard J. Troy	1,050,085	34.20
Socialist Workers	Guy C. Miller	13,366	0.44
Libertarian	Sheldon Waxman	11,917	0.39
U.S. Labor	Richard D. Leebove	4,874	0.16
Write-in	Others	31	0.00
Total votes		3,070,031	100

=== Secretary of State ===
1978 Illinois Secretary of State election
- November 7, 1978
- Turnout: 53.98%
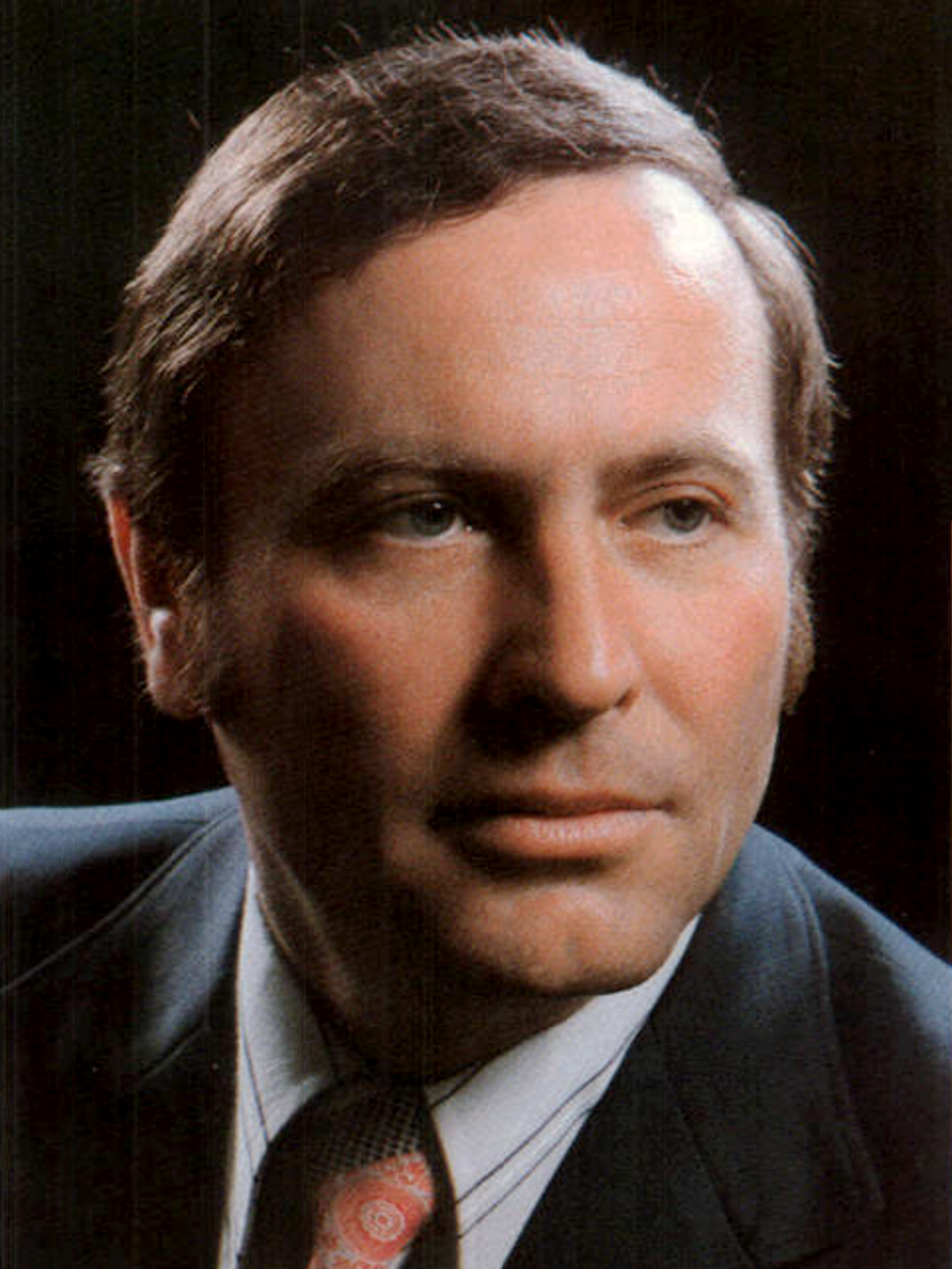

Nominee	Alan J. Dixon	Sharon Sharp
Party	Democratic	Republican
Popular vote	2,314,546	797,560
Percentage	73.82%	25.44%
- County results Dixon: 50–60% 60–70% 70–80%
Secretary of State before election
Alan J. Dixon
Democratic
Elected Secretary of State
Alan J. Dixon
Democratic

Incumbent Secretary of State Alan J. Dixon, a Democrat, was reelected to a second term.

Dixon's margin-of victory was considered to be a landslide.

==== Democratic primary ====
Incumbent Alan J. Dixon won the Democratic primary, running unopposed.

Secretary of State Democratic primary
Party	Candidate	Votes	%
Democratic	Alan J. Dixon (incumbent)	602,852	100
Write-in	Others	9	0.00
Total votes		602,861	100

==== Republican primary ====
Sharon Sharp, the Clerk of Elk Grove Township, was nominated in the Republican primary without opposition.

Secretary of State Republican primary
Party	Candidate	Votes	%
Republican	Sharon Sharp	415,789	100
Write-in	Others	9	0.00
Total votes		415,799	100

==== General election ====
Secretary of State election
Party	Candidate	Votes	%
Democratic	Alan J. Dixon (incumbent)	2,314,546	73.82
Republican	Sharon Sharp	797,560	25.44
Socialist Workers	Marie Cobbs	10,247	0.33
Libertarian	Ed May	9,104	0.29
U.S. Labor	Edward Waffle	4,058	0.13
Write-in	Others	12	0.00
Total votes		3,135,527	100

=== Comptroller ===
1978 Illinois State Comptroller election
- November 7, 1978
- Turnout: 51.40%
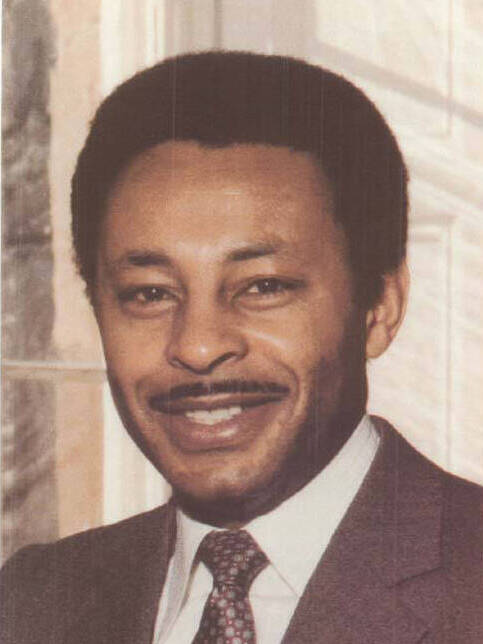

Nominee	Roland Burris	John W. Castle
Party	Democratic	Republican
Popular vote	1,542,983	1,389,049
Percentage	51.67%	46.52%
- County results Burris: 40–50% 50–60% 60–70% Castle: 40–50% 50–60% 60–70% 70–80%
State Comptroller before election
Michael Bakalis
Democratic
Elected State Comptroller
Roland Burris
Democratic

Incumbent Comptroller Michael Bakalis, a Democrat, did not seek a second term, instead opting to run for governor. Democrat Roland Burris was elected to succeed him. In winning the election, Burris became the first American American to be elected to statewide office in Illinois.

==== Democratic primary ====
With more than 64% of the vote, Roland Burris defeated State Representative Richard Luft in the Democratic primary.

Burris was a Chicago attorney that had formerly served as director of the Department of General Services under Governor Dan Walker. Luft had been the early favorite for the party to slate, but at the last minute was beaten out by Burris when the party finally slated candidates. It was reported that black Chicago Democrats had pressured the party to slate a black candidate for statewide office.

During the campaign, Burris and Luft argued over Burris' record as director of the Department of General Services.

Secretary of State Democratic primary
Party	Candidate	Votes	%
Democratic	Roland W. Burris	418,735	64.03
Democratic	Richard N. Luft	235,192	35.97
Total votes		653,927	100

==== Republican primary ====
With more than 52% of the vote, John W. Castle, director of the Department of Local Government Affairs, defeated W. Robert Blair, former Speaker of the Illinois House of Representatives, in the Republican primary. Governor James R. Thompson, who had convinced Castle to abandon his declared plans to run for treasurer and instead run for comptroller, publicly endorsed Castle. Blair criticized Castle for this endorsement, alleging that he would not be able to operate the comptroller's office independently of the governor, while Castle denied that his decisions would be influenced by his political ties to Thompson.

Secretary of State Republican primary
Party	Candidate	Votes	%
Republican	John W. Castle	238,086	52.02
Republican	W. Robert Blair	219,570	47.98
Write-in	Others	2	0.00
Total votes		457,656	100

==== General election ====
Comptroller election
Party	Candidate	Votes	%
Democratic	Roland W. Burris	1,542,983	51.67
Republican	John W. Castle	1,389,049	46.52
Libertarian	Mark B. Wallace	21,645	0.72
Socialist Workers	John Eriksen	17,116	0.57
U.S. Labor	Carol Leebove	15,181	0.51
Write-in	Others	14	0.00
Total votes		2,985,988	100

=== Treasurer ===
1978 Illinois State Treasurer election
- November 7, 1978
- Turnout: 51.32%
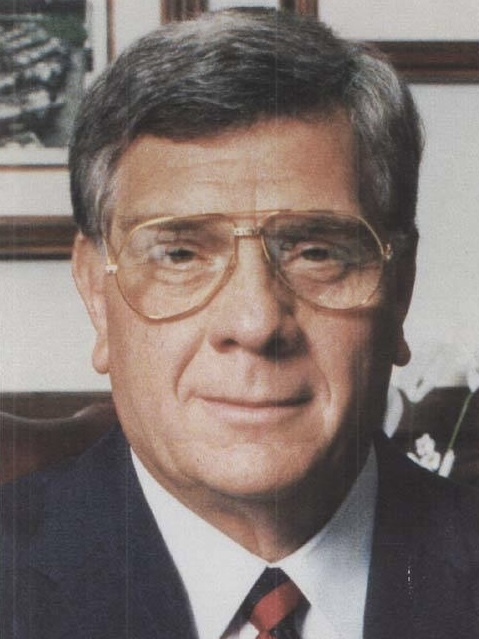

Nominee	Jerome Cosentino	James M. Skelton
Party	Democratic	Republican
Popular vote	1,548,605	1,383,966
Percentage	51.95%	46.42%
- County results Cosentino: 40–50% 50–60% 60–70% 70–80% Skelton: 40–50% 50–60% 60–70% 70–80%
Treasurer before election
Donald R. Smith
Republican
Elected Treasurer
Jerome Cosentino
Democratic

Incumbent Treasurer was Donald R. Smith, a Republican who had been appointed in 1977, did not seek reelection. Democrat Jerome Cosentino was elected to succeed him in office. This election made Cosentino the first Italian-American to be elected to statewide office in Illinois.

==== Democratic primary ====
In the Democratic primary, the party establishment had slated Metropolitan Water Reclamation District of Greater Chicago commissioner Jerome Cosentino as its preferred candidate. He won the primary with 60% of the vote, defeating Nina T. Shepherd, a trustee of the University of Illinois. Shepherd received the endorsement of Independent Voter of Illinois in the primary. She ran largely due to the failure of the party of slate a woman for any statewide office. The primary was not overly heated. One issue that haunted Cosentino was that his trucking firm was under investigation by the Interstate Commerce Commission for possible violations of the Interstate Commerce Act. While the investigation found no evidence of wrongdoing, it was not completed until after the primary was over.

Treasurer Democratic primary
Party	Candidate	Votes	%
Democratic	Jerome A. Cosentino	402,489	60.71
Democratic	Nina T. Shepherd	260,512	39.29
Write-in	Others	1	0.00
Total votes		663,002	100

==== Republican primary ====
James M. Skelton, the incumbent county treasurer of Champaign County, won a narrow 52% victory over Bradley M. Glass in the Republican primary. With Skelton being a downstate politician, and Glass being an upstate politician, the race had the dynamics of "downstate vs. upstate". John W. Castle had originally announced that he would run for the Republican nomination for Treasurer, before being convinced by Governor James R. Thompson to instead run for comptroller.

County map of the 1978 Illinois Republican Treasurer primary Skelton: 50-60% 60-70% 70-80% 80-90% 90-100% Glass: 50-60% 60-70% 70-80%

Treasurer Republican primary
Party	Candidate	Votes	%
Republican	James M. Skelton	236,802	52.82
Republican	Brad Glass	211,591	47.19
Write-in	Others	1	0.00
Total votes		448,394	100

==== General election ====
Treasurer election
Party	Candidate	Votes	%
Democratic	Jerome A. "Jerry" Cosentino	1,548,605	51.95
Republican	James M. Skelton	1,383,966	46.42
Libertarian	Everett Moffat	17,496	0.59
U.S. Labor	John H. Brown, Jr.	15,682	0.53
Socialist Workers	Randi Lawrence	15,411	0.52
Write-in	Others	22	0.00
Total votes		2,981,182	100

=== State Senate ===
One-third of the seats of the Illinois Senate were up for election in 1982. Democrats retained control of the chamber.

=== State House of Representatives ===
All of the seats in the Illinois House of Representatives were up for election in 1978. Democrats retained control of the chamber.

=== Trustees of University of Illinois ===
1978 Trustees of University of Illinois election
- November 7, 1978

An election was held for three of nine seats for Trustees of University of Illinois system.

The election saw the reelection incumbent second-term Republican Ralph Crane Hahn and the election of new members, Democrats Edmund Roche Donoghue and Paul Stone.

Incumbent Republican Park Livingston and incumbent first-term Republican Jane Hayes Rader lost reelection.

Trustees of the University of Illinois election
Party	Candidate	Votes	%
Democratic	Paul Stone	1,409,086	17.04
Democratic	Edmund R. Donoghue	1,348,011	16.30
Republican	Ralph C. Hahn (incumbent)	1,324,857	16.02
Democratic	Robert J. "Bob" Webb	1,302,741	15.75
Republican	Jane Hayes Rader (incumbent)	1,285,296	15.54
Republican	Park Livingston (incumbent)	1,281,284	15.49
U.S. Labor	Suzanne Rose	53,630	0.65
Socialist Workers	Jo-Ann Della-Guistina	47,191	0.57
Libertarian	William Mitchell	44,303	0.54
Libertarian	James McCawley	37,298	0.45
Libertarian	John Adrian	34,514	0.42
Socialist Workers	John Pottinger	29,480	0.36
U.S. Labor	Mitchell F. Hirsch	28,220	0.34
U.S. Labor	Maureen Ravenscroft	25,424	0.31
Socialist Workers	Lee Kail	20,071	0.24
Write-in	Others	15	0.00
Total votes		8,271,421	100

=== Judicial elections ===
Multiple judicial positions were up for election in 1978.

=== Ballot measures ===
Illinois voters voted on a two legislatively referred constitutional amendment ballot measures in 1978. In order to be approved, the measures required either 60% support among those specifically voting on the measure or 50% support among all ballots cast in the elections.

==== Personal Property Tax Amendment ====
The Personal Property Tax Amendment (also known as "Amendment 1") was a legislatively referred constitutional amendment which would have amended Article IX, Section 5 of the Constitution of Illinois to eliminate the provision that required the legislature to abolish the personal property tax by January 1, 1979. It failed to meet either threshold to amend the constitution.

Personal Property Tax Amendment
Option	Votes	% of votes on measures	% of all ballots cast
Yes	952,416	56.48	28.49
No	733,845	43.52	21.95
Total votes	1,686,261	100	50.44
Voter turnout	29.03%		

Amendment 1 results by county Yes: 70–80%; 60–70%; 50–60%; No: 50–60%

==== Exempt Veterans' Organizations from Property Taxes Amendment ====
The Exempt Veterans' Organizations from Property Taxes Amendment (also known as "Property Tax Exemption for Veterans' Organizations Amendment" and "Amendment 2") was a legislatively referred constitutional amendment which would have amended Article IX, Section 6 of the Constitution of Illinois to exempt veterans' associations from paying property taxes on their meeting halls. It failed to meet either threshold to amend the constitution.

Exempt Veterans' Organizations from Property Taxes Amendment
Option	Votes	% of votes on measures	% of all ballots cast
Yes	747,907	48.11	22.37
No	806,579	51.89	24.13
Total votes	1,554,486	100	46.50
Voter turnout	26.76%		

Amendment 2 results by county No: 50–60%; Yes: 60–70%; 50–60%

== Local elections ==
Local elections were held.
