= Thom Serafin =

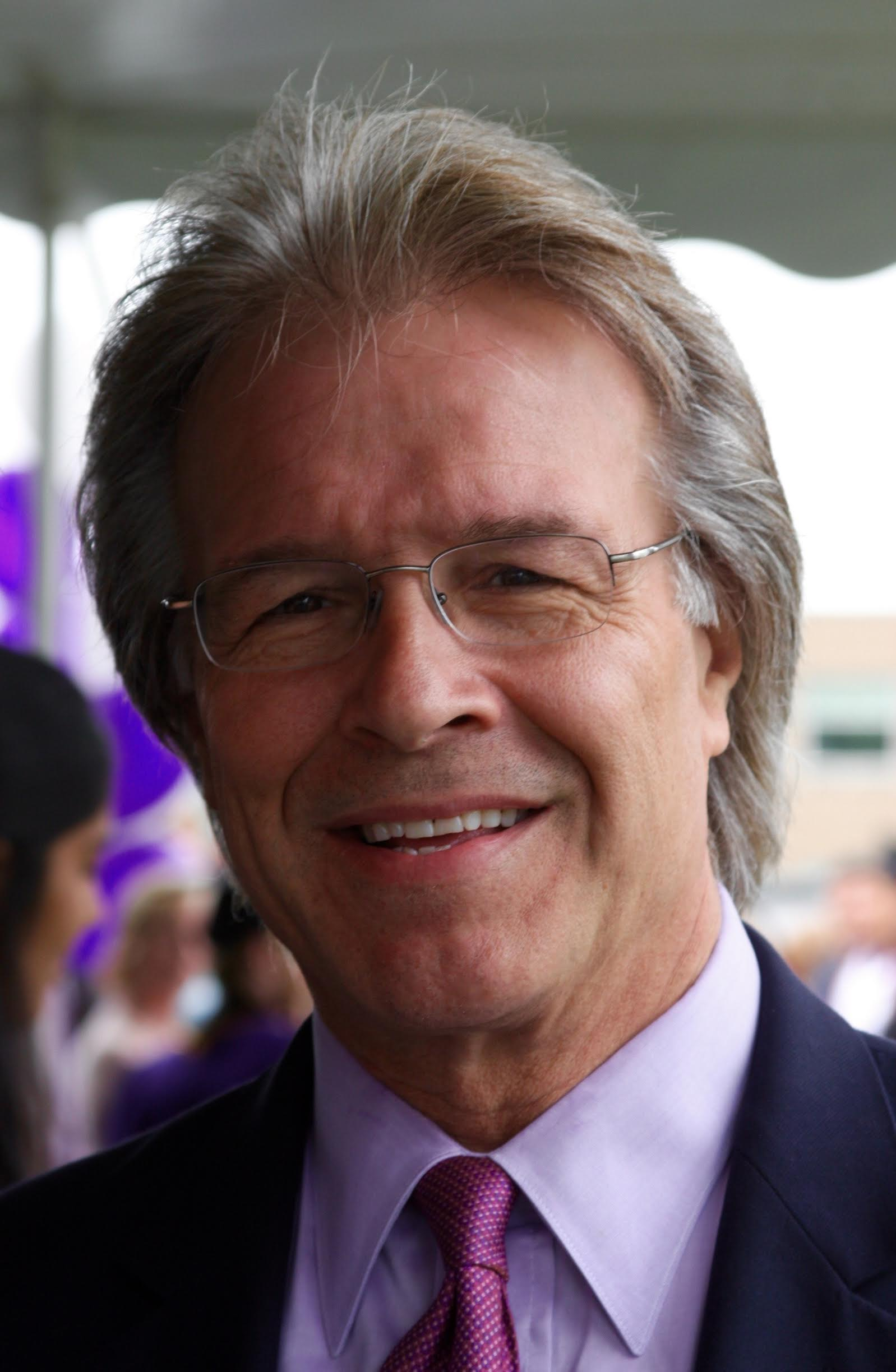
- Thom Serafin (2015)
- Occupation: Public affairs consultant

Thom Serafin is a public affairs consultant specializing in politics and media. He is the founder and CEO of Serafin & Associates, Inc., a Chicago-based firm specializing in crisis communication. Thom is active at his local parish, St. Francis Xavier in La Grange, and is a volunteer usher for Sunday mass. Crain's Chicago Business has included him in their list of Illinois' 20 most powerful political insiders.

== Early life ==
Serafin was born in Milwaukee, Wisconsin. He attended Sangamon State University (now the University of Illinois at Springfield), and in 1973 earned a B.A. in communications and a minor in film-making. As an undergraduate, he assisted his professor and mentor, future U.S. Senator Paul Simon, in launching the UIS Public Affairs Reporting (PAR) program, and later earned his master's degree in PAR from the program.

== Career ==
Serafin began his career as the Springfield correspondent for the Capitol Information Bureau (now the Illinois Radio Network).

In 1978, he left his job as a legislative correspondent to become press secretary for Alex Seith, the Democratic nominee for the U.S. Senate, in his challenge to the incumbent U.S. Senator Charles H. Percy. Despite Seith's obscurity, the campaign mounted a strong challenge and nearly pulled off an upset victory. Serafin managed Seith's second Senate bid in 1984; the campaign advertisements Serafin designed were called "corny but effective," beginning his career in politics.

His next job in politics was as press secretary for U.S. Senator Alan Dixon. As Dixon's "top political operative", he worked on campaigns for other Democratic candidates in Illinois, including future U.S. Senator Dick Durbin's first congressional run and Illinois State Treasurer James Donnewald's reelection bid. In 1987, he joined Gary Hart's presidential campaign as its Illinois manager. He was one of two Hart spokesmen to confirm on May 8, 1987, that Hart was withdrawing from the presidential race.

Over the following years, Serafin served as a political and media consultant for a number of candidates, including future Illinois Appellate Judge Aurelia Pucinski and the first female African-American U.S. Senator, Carol Moseley-Braun. He worked for U.S Representative Dan Rostenkowski for much of the early 1990s, until Rostenkowski's general election loss in 1994. He continued to work on political campaigns, establishing his reputation as an independent by working for both Democrats and Republicans.

Serafin & Associates has refocused its business away from campaigns for public office and towards crisis communication for businesses, unions, and non-profits. The firm's clients have included the Illinois Council on Developmental Disabilities, Wal-Mart, Morgan Stanley, Vulcan Materials, the Carpenters Union, Ameren Power Company, Arlington Park International Racecourse, Westfield Concession Management and Dynegy.

Since 1996, Serafin has hosted an annual holiday party known for attracting Chicago's political, media, and business "A-listers." Held the Tuesday before Thanksgiving, the gathering is known to bring people together from "opposing political [and] business fronts."

In 2001, he traveled to Cuba as part of former U.S. Senator Paul Simon's delegation of academics and public officials. Serafin was one of the six members of the delegation to share a six-hour luncheon with Fidel Castro.

On May 16, 2015, Serafin delivered the commencement address at the University of Illinois at Springfield.
