= 1980 United States Senate election in Illinois =

- November 4, 1980
- Turnout: 73.51%
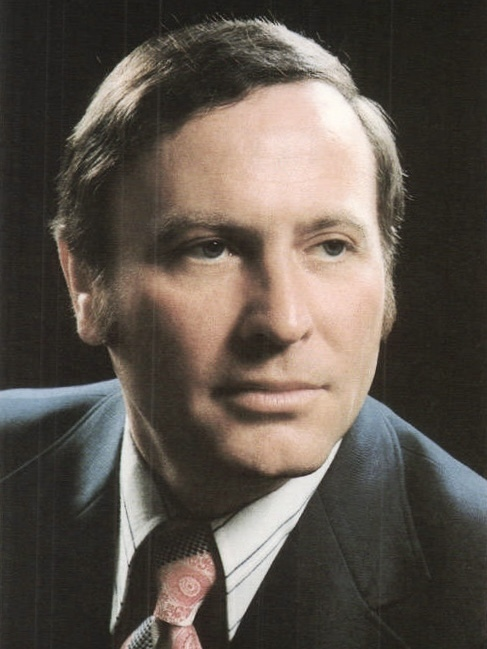

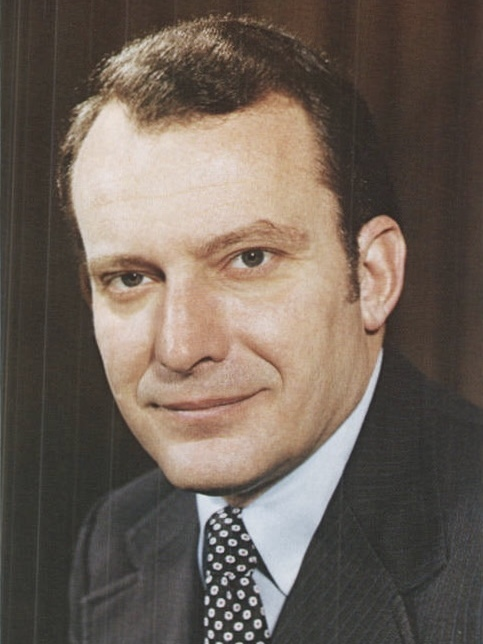
Nominee	Alan Dixon	Dave O'Neal
Party	Democratic	Republican
Popular vote	2,565,302	1,946,296
Percentage	56.01%	42.50%
- County results Dixon: 40–50% 50–60% 60–70% O'Neal: 40–50% 50–60% 60–70%
U.S. senator before election
Adlai Stevenson III
Democratic
Elected U.S. Senator
Alan J. Dixon
Democratic

The 1980 United States Senate election in Illinois was held on November 4, 1980. Incumbent Democrat U.S. Senator Adlai Stevenson III decided to retire. Democrat Alan J. Dixon won the open seat. Dixon won in a landslide victory, despite Republican presidential nominee Ronald Reagan carrying the state in the simultaneous presidential election comfortably.

== Background ==
The primaries and general elections coincided with those for other federal offices (President and House), as well as those for state offices.

Incumbent Democrat Adlai Stevenson III opted not to seek reelection to a third-term. This was the first open-race for this senate seat since 1938.

Turnout in the primary elections was 35.36%, with a total of 2,026,814 votes cast.

Turnout during the general election was 73.51%, with 4,579,933 votes cast.

== Democratic primary ==
Alan J. Dixon overwhelmingly won the Democratic primary.

=== Candidates ===
- Alan J. Dixon, Illinois Secretary of State
- Anthony R. Martin-Trigona, candidate for U.S. senator in 1978
- Alex Seith, Democratic nominee for U.S. senator in 1978
- Robert Ash Wallace, businessman and chairman of the board of PSM International Corporation
- Dakin Williams, prosecutor and perennial candidate

=== Campaign ===
Alex Seith, who had won the Democratic nomination for Senator two years earlier, almost winning the 1978 race in what would have been a major upset, laid hopes of capturing the nomination again.

Anthony R. Martin-Trigona, a political activist who had unsuccessfully sought the nomination for senate in 1978, again ran for the nomination.

Robert Ash "Bob" Wallace made use of his friendship with boxer Muhammad Ali, featuring him in campaign ads and having him make campaign appearances.

Dakin Williams was a prosecutor, and was the younger brother of famous playwright Tennessee Williams. He had been a candidate for the Democratic nomination of Illinois' other US Senate seat in 1972, and had unsuccessfully sought the nomination for this seat in 1974. He had also been a candidate for governor in 1978.

=== Results ===
Democratic primary
Party	Candidate	Votes	%
Democratic	Alan J. Dixon	671,746	66.88
Democratic	Alex Seith	190,339	18.95
Democratic	Robert Ash "Bob" Wallace	64,037	6.38
Democratic	Anthony R. Martin-Trigona	39,711	3.95
Democratic	Dankin Williams	38,388	3.82
Write-in		153	0.00
Total votes		1,004,374	100.00

== Republican primary ==
=== Candidates ===
- Richard E. Carver, mayor of Peoria, Illinois
- Dave O'Neal, Lieutenant Governor of Illinois
- William J. Scott, Illinois Attorney General

=== Results ===
Republican primary
Party	Candidate	Votes	%
Republican	David C. O'Neal	424,634	41.53
Republican	William J. Scott	352,138	34.44
Republican	Dick Carver	245,668	24.03
Write-in		141	0.00
Total votes		1,022,440	100.00

== General election ==
General election
Party	Candidate	Votes	%	
Democratic	Alan J. Dixon	2,565,302	56.01%	▼6.14
Republican	David C. O'Neal	1,946,296	42.50%	▲5.28
Libertarian	Bruce Green	29,328	0.64%	N/A
Independent	Sidney Lens	19,213	0.42%	
Communist	Charles F. Wilson	11,453	0.25%	▲0.05
Workers World	Michael Soriano	5,626	0.12%	N/A
Socialist Workers	Burton Lee Artz	2,715	0.06%	▼0.37
Write-in		96	0.00%	
Total votes		4,579,933	100.00%	
Democratic hold				

== See also ==
- 1980 United States Senate elections
