= Mark Batinick =

American politician

Member of the Illinois House of Representatives from the 97th district
- In office January 14, 2015 – January 11, 2023
- Preceded by: Tom Cross
- Succeeded by: Harry Benton

Personal details
- Party: Republican
- Profession: Commercial real estate broker

Mark Batinick is an American politician who served as a Republican member of the Illinois House of Representatives who represented the 97th district. The 97th district includes all or parts of Oswego, Plainfield and Shorewood.

As of July 3, 2022, Representative Batinick is a member of the following Illinois House committees:

- Health Care Licenses Committee (HHCL)
- Immigration & Human Rights Committee (SIHR)
- Insurance Committee (HINS)
- International Trade & Commerce Committee (HITC)
- Personnel & Pensions Committee (HPPN)

Mark Batinick did not run for reelection and was succeeded by Democrat Harry Benton.
