= Roman Pucinski =

American politician

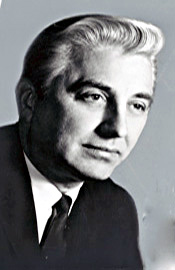

Member of the U.S. House of Representatives from Illinois's 11th district
- In office January 3, 1959 – January 3, 1973
- Preceded by: Timothy P. Sheehan
- Succeeded by: Frank Annunzio

City of Chicago Alderman from the 41st Ward
- In office 1973–1991
- Preceded by: Edward T. Scholl
- Succeeded by: Brian Doherty

Personal details
- Born: May 13, 1919 Buffalo, New York, U.S.
- Died: September 25, 2002 (aged 83) Chicago, Illinois, U.S.
- Party: Democratic
- Education: Northwestern University; John Marshall Law School
- Profession: Politician; Newspaper Reporter

Military service
- Allegiance: United States
- Branch/service: United States Army Air Corps
- Years of service: 1941-1945

Roman Conrad Pucinski (May 13, 1919 – September 25, 2002) was an American Democratic politician from Chicago, Illinois. He was a U.S. representative from 1959 to 1973 and alderman from the 41st Ward of Chicago from 1973 to 1991. He was considered a longtime leader of Chicago Polonia and was seen to represent its interests in Washington.

== Early and family life ==
He was born in Buffalo, New York, but moved to Chicago with his family as a child. In 1941, he graduated from Northwestern University. During World War II, he served in the Air Force. After the war, he attended John Marshall Law School in Chicago and graduated in 1949.

== Career ==
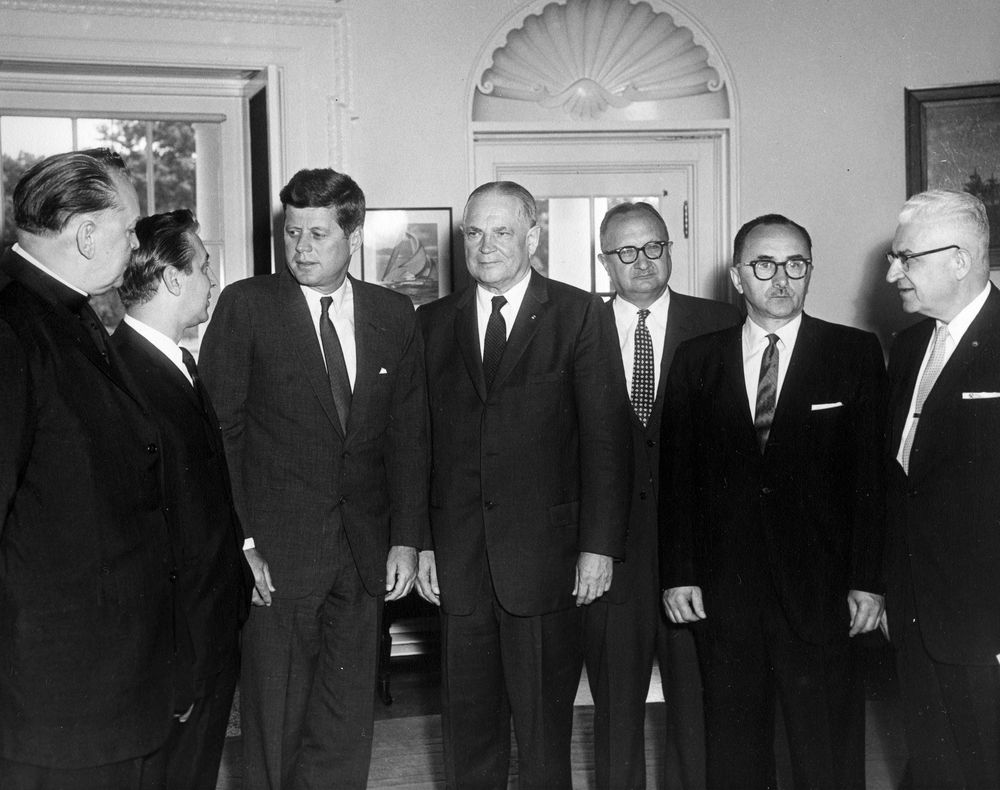
President John F. Kennedy meets with a delegation from the Polish American Congress in the Oval Office, White House, Washington, D.C., in 1961. (L-R) Secretary General of the Polish American Congress Reverend Valerian S. Karcz; Director of the Polish American Congress Representative Roman Pucinski of Illinois; President Kennedy; President of the Polish American Congress Karol (Charles) Rozmarek; and three unidentified men.

Pucinski worked in journalism for many years, notably at the Chicago Sun-Times. In 1952, he was chief investigator for the Congressional Special Committee which investigated the Katyn Massacre. This was of special interest to him as a Polish-American. In 1958, Pucinski was elected U.S. Representative from the heavily Polish-American 11th District on the Northwest Side of Chicago. He was re-elected to six additional terms, serving from 1959 to 1973.

As a representative, Pucinski pushed for the installation of "black box" flight recorders on all passenger airliners and supported federal assistance to community colleges.

When congressional districts were redrawn after the 1970 Census, Pucinski's district remained solidly Democrat but he was chosen as the Democratic nominee for the United States Senate against incumbent Senator Charles H. Percy; he lost in a landslide.

In 1973, he was first elected alderman from the 41st Ward of Chicago, which had been part of his old congressional district and was heavily Polish-American. Pucinski also served as Democratic Ward Committeeman from the 41st Ward for many years. After Mayor Richard J. Daley died in 1976, Pucinski ran in the Democratic primary of the special election to succeed him in 1977, even though the Democratic Party had endorsed Michael Bilandic. Bilandic won, Pucinski was the second-place finisher, and Harold Washington came in third with 11%.

During the Council Wars of Harold Washington's first term as mayor, Pucinski was part of the Vrdolyak 29 opposition bloc.

In 1987, he proposed requiring employee voting on any Employee Stock Ownership Plan established by a corporation based in Chicago. In 1984, he supported a redistribution of Community Development Block Grant funds that would have allocated $1.3 million to repave streets in the 41st Ward.

The 41st Ward usually voted for Republicans and the aging Pucinski was defeated in his campaign for re-election as alderman by Republican Brian Doherty in 1991.

== Death and legacy ==
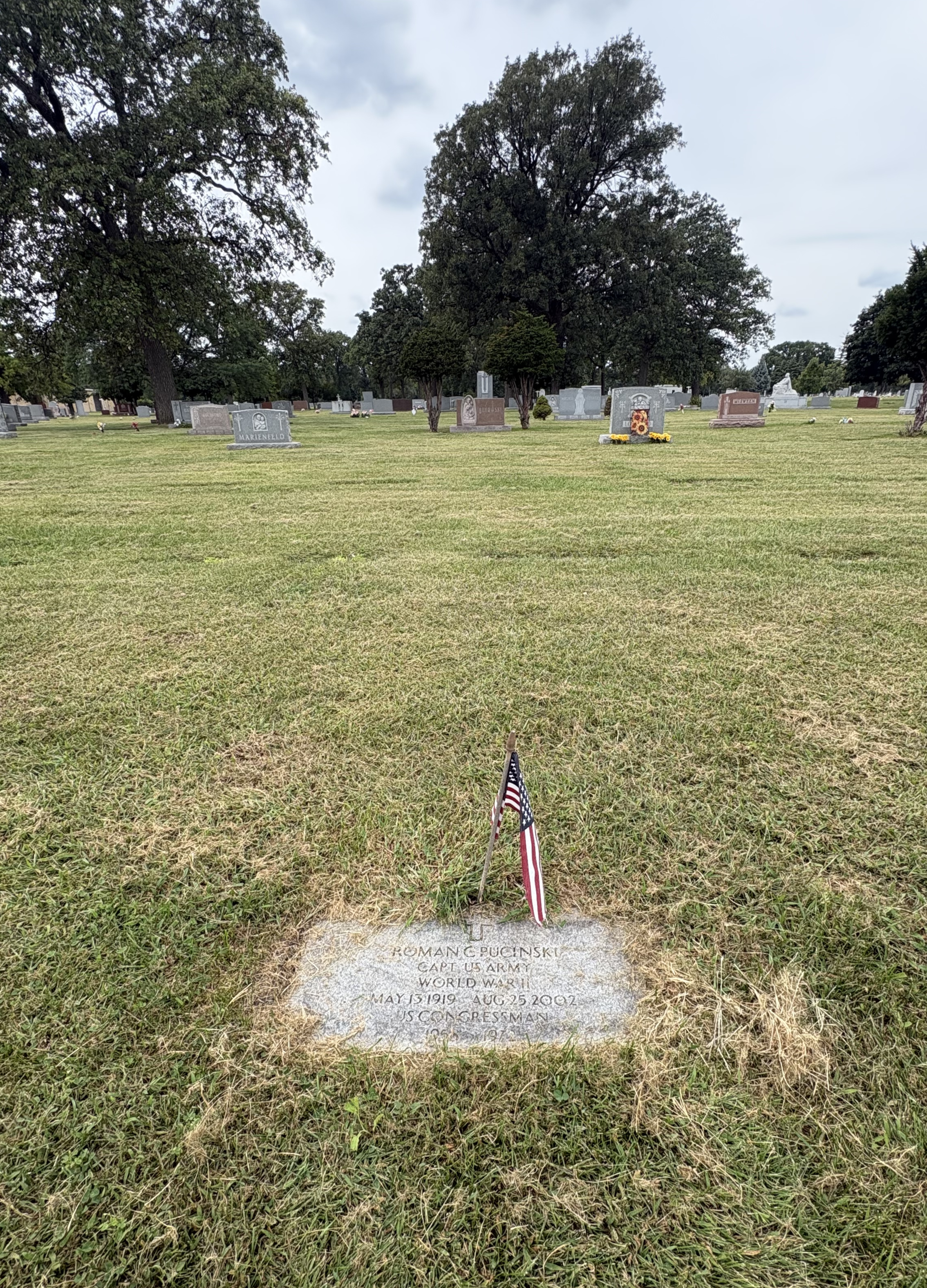
Pucinski's grave at St. Joseph Cemetery

Pucinski was a Catholic. His daughter Aurelia followed him into law and politics. She eventually left the Democratic Party for its Republican counterpart in 1997, but switched back to the Democrats seven years later. Pucinski died in Chicago in 2002, and was buried at St. Joseph Cemetery in River Grove, Illinois. His son Christopher died in 2006.

Party political offices
Preceded by Paul Douglas	Democratic nominee for U.S. Senator from Illinois (Class 2); 1972	Succeeded by Alex Seith
U.S. House of Representatives
Preceded by Timothy P. Sheehan	Member of the U.S. House of Representatives from Illinois's 11th congressional district 1959-1973	Succeeded by Frank Annunzio
