= Harry Benton =

American politician in Illinois

Member of the Illinois House of Representatives from the 97th district
- In office January 11, 2023 – July 3, 2026
- Preceded by: Mark Batinick
- Succeeded by: Jessica Dixon Heitman

Personal details
- Party: Democratic

Harry Benton (born 1987 or 1988) is an American politician who served as a member of the Illinois House of Representatives for the 97th district from 2023 until his resignation in 2026.

By profession, Benton is a union ironworker. Benton was a Plainfield village trustee and the unsuccessful Democratic nominee in the same district in 2020.

In February 2026, he was removed from the Democratic caucus and all committees by Speaker Chris Welch. He resigned in July 2026 following an ethics investigation, which found that he had engaged in a "pattern and practice of inappropriate sexual conduct" dating back to 2023, shortly after he had been seated. It later became known that Welch had been aware of sexual harassment allegations against Benton as early as early as April 2023.
