= Alan J. Dixon =

American politician (1927–2014)

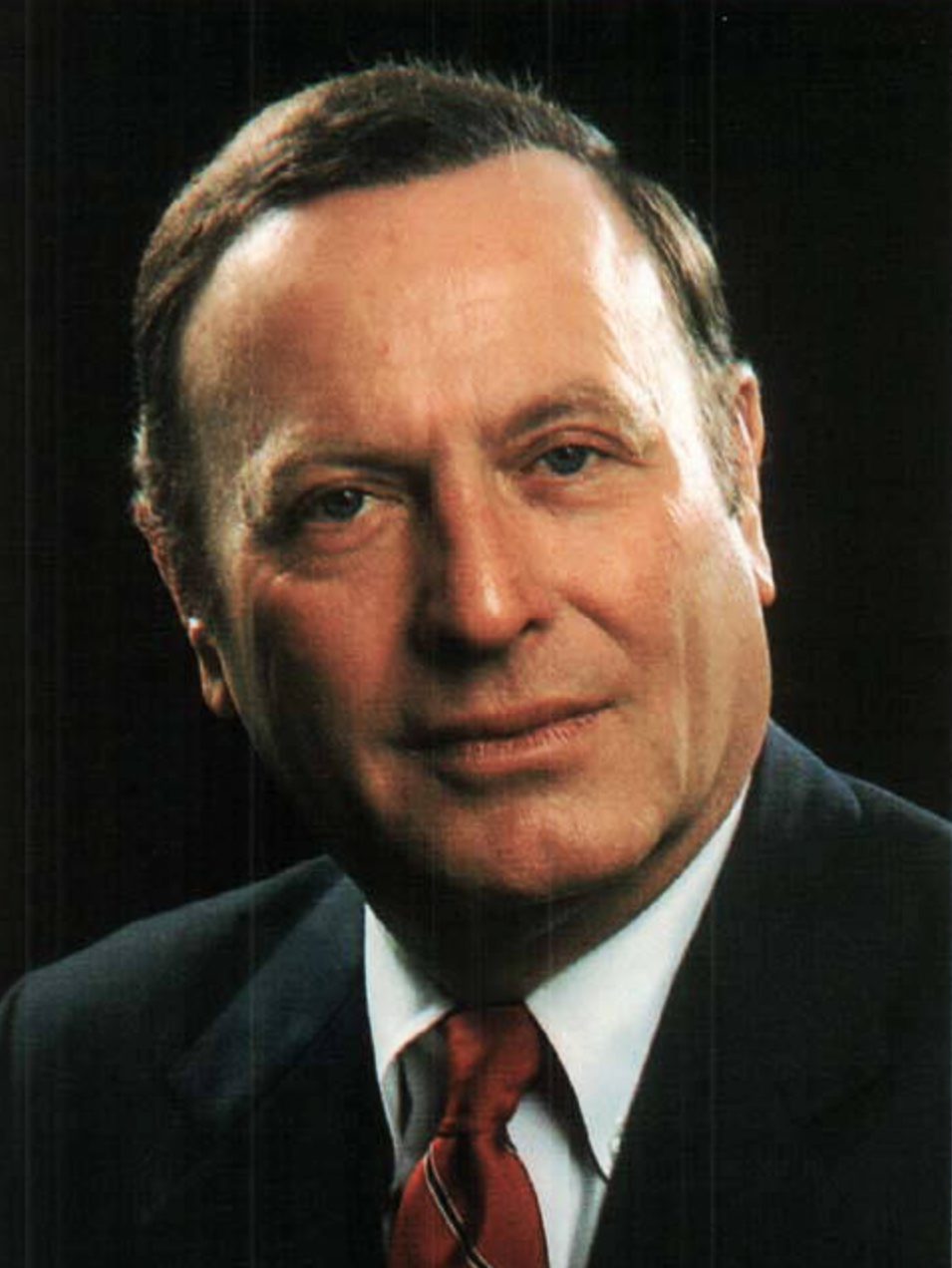
- Dixon in 1987

United States Senator from Illinois
- In office January 3, 1981 – January 3, 1993
- Preceded by: Adlai Stevenson III
- Succeeded by: Carol Moseley Braun

34th Secretary of State of Illinois
- In office January 10, 1977 – January 3, 1981
- Governor: Jim Thompson
- Preceded by: Michael Howlett
- Succeeded by: Jim Edgar

65th Treasurer of Illinois
- In office January 11, 1971 – January 10, 1977
- Governor: Richard B. Ogilvie; Dan Walker
- Preceded by: Charles W. Woodford
- Succeeded by: Donald R. Smith

Member of the Illinois Senate
- In office 1963–1971

Member of the Illinois House of Representatives
- In office 1951–1963

Personal details
- Born: Alan John Dixon; July 7, 1927 Belleville, Illinois, U.S.
- Died: July 6, 2014 (aged 86) Fairview Heights, Illinois, U.S.
- Party: Democratic
- Relatives: Jessica Dixon Heitman (granddaughter)
- Education: University of Illinois Urbana-Champaign (BA); Washington University in St. Louis (JD)

Military service
- Allegiance: United States
- Branch/service: United States Navy
- Battles/wars: World War II

Alan John Dixon (July 7, 1927 – July 6, 2014) was an American politician and member of the Democratic Party who served in the Illinois General Assembly from 1951 to 1971, as the Illinois Treasurer from 1971 to 1977, as the Illinois Secretary of State from 1977 to 1981 and as a member of the United States Senate from 1981 to 1993.

== Early life ==
Born in Belleville, Illinois, on July 7, 1927, Dixon attended Illinois public schools and later earned his bachelor's degree from the University of Illinois at Urbana-Champaign and his J.D. from Washington University School of Law in 1949. While attending the University of Illinois, he joined the Delta Upsilon fraternity. During World War II, Dixon served in the United States Navy.

== State political career ==
=== General Assembly ===
Dixon served as a member of the Illinois House of Representatives from 1951 to 1963 and as a member of the Illinois Senate from 1963 to 1971, serving as Minority Whip for part of that time.

=== Karl Rove and the Dixon campaign incident ===
In the fall of 1970, Karl Rove, a future White House Deputy Chief of Staff in the George W. Bush administration, used a false identity to enter the office of Dixon's campaign for Illinois Treasurer and stole 1,000 sheets of paper with campaign letterhead. Rove then printed fake campaign rally fliers promising "free beer, free food, girls and a good time for nothing", and distributed them at rock concerts and homeless shelters, with the effect of disrupting Dixon's rally. Dixon eventually won the election. Rove's role did not become publicly known until August 1973. Rove told the Dallas Morning News in 1999, "It was a youthful prank at the age of 19 and I regret it."

=== 1976 elections ===
In 1976, Dixon was elected Illinois Secretary of State. The 1976 Illinois State election was turbulent for the Democratic Party. Outgoing Governor Dan Walker had lost the support of the party and was defeated in the primary election. Dixon's election as Secretary of State left two years on his term as State Treasurer. To prevent Walker from appointing himself or anyone else to the position, Dixon proposed to incoming Republican Governor James R. Thompson that he would resign after Thompson was inaugurated if Thompson agreed to Dixon's choice for State Treasurer. Dixon's choice was Donald R. Smith, a Republican who was the ranking Civil Service employee in the State Treasurer's office and who had agreed not to run for re-election. Dixon served as Secretary of State until 1981, when he took office as a United States senator from Illinois.

== United States Senate ==
Dixon was elected to the Senate in 1980, defeating Republican nominee Dave O'Neal by about 14 points. He was re-elected in a landslide in 1986, defeating Republican Judy Koehler by nearly 32 points.

Dixon was generally considered a moderate and was less visible nationally than either of his Illinois colleagues, Charles Percy and Paul Simon, both of whom sought the presidency. In 1992, Dixon lost in the Democratic primary for U.S. Senate to Carol Moseley Braun, the Cook County Recorder of Deeds and a former State Representative. Dixon's defeat shocked observers; at the time no senator had been defeated in a primary in over a decade and Dixon had a long record of electoral success. His vote to confirm Clarence Thomas to the U.S. Supreme Court contributed to his defeat. Dixon was sharply criticized during the campaign by Moseley Braun for supporting Clarence Thomas' nomination despite allegations of Thomas sexually harassing Anita Hill.

Moseley Braun, a black woman, had the complete support of black voters, and as a known reformist liberal got a large share of liberal voters, and also attracted many women voters in what was termed "The Year of the Woman". Another factor was the third candidate in the race, multi-millionaire attorney Al Hofeld. Hofeld drew away some of the moderate and conservative Democrats who normally supported Dixon. He also spent a large amount of money running advertisements attacking Dixon, weakening his support. The Chicago Tribune ran a piece in which Eric Zorn claimed that Dixon's voting to confirm Clarence Thomas in 1991 set off a chain of events that led to Barack Obama's election as president in 2008, as Moseley Braun's defeat in 1998 allowed Obama to run for the seat without facing a Democratic incumbent in 2004.

=== Later life and death ===
Dixon chaired the Defense Base Realignment and Closure Commission in 1994 and 1995. After his term in the Senate, Dixon resumed practicing law with the Bryan Cave law firm in St. Louis and lived in Fairview Heights, Illinois, where he died on July 6, 2014, from natural causes just 1 day shy of his 87th birthday. His autobiography, The Gentleman from Illinois: Stories from Forty Years of Elective Public Service, was published in 2013 by Southern Illinois University Press.

== Awards ==
Alan J. Dixon was inducted as a Laureate of The Lincoln Academy of Illinois and awarded the Order of Lincoln (the State's highest honor) by the Governor of Illinois in 1994 in the area of government.

== Electoral history ==
1976 Illinois Secretary of State Democratic primary
Party	Candidate	Votes	%
Democratic	Alan J. Dixon	984,934	77.35
Democratic	Vince Demuzio	288,354	22.65
Total votes		1,273,288	100

1976 Illinois Secretary of State general election
Party	Candidate	Votes	%
Democratic	Alan J. Dixon	2,906,311	64.55
Republican	William C. Harris	1,562,028	34.69
Libertarian	Ellyn Powelson	10,461	0.23
Communist	Frances Gabow	8,271	0.18
Socialist Workers	Eva Lynn Masterson	6,356	0.14
U.S. Labor	John H. Brown, Jr.	5,212	0.12
Socialist Labor	Ben Leonik	3,876	0.09
Write-in	Others	30	0.00
Total votes		4,502,545	100

1980 United States Senate election in Illinois Democratic primary
Party	Candidate	Votes	%
Democratic	Alan J. Dixon	671,746	66.88
Democratic	Alex Seith	190,339	18.95
Democratic	Robert Ash "Bob" Wallace	64,037	6.38
Democratic	Anthony R. Martin-Trigona	39,711	3.95
Democratic	Dankin Williams	38,388	3.82
Write-in		153	0.00
Total votes		1,004,374	100.00

1980 United States Senate election in Illinois general election
Party	Candidate	Votes	%
Democratic	Alan J. Dixon	2,565,302	56.01%
Republican	David C. O'Neal	1,946,296	42.50%
Libertarian	Bruce Green	29,328	0.64%
Independent	Sidney Lens	19,213	0.42%
Communist	Charles F. Wilson	11,453	0.25%
Workers World	Michael Soriano	5,626	0.12%
Socialist Workers	Burton Lee Artz	2,715	0.06%
Write-in		96	0.00%
Total votes		4,579,933	100.00%
Democratic hold			

1986 United States Senate election in Illinois Democratic primary
Party	Candidate	Votes	%
Democratic	Alan J. Dixon (incumbent)	720,571	84.77
Democratic	Sheila Jones	129,474	15.23
Write-in	Others	4	0.00
Total votes		850,049	100

1986 Illinois United States Senate election
Party	Candidate	Votes	%	±%
Democratic	Alan J. Dixon (incumbent)	2,033,783	65.13%	+9.12%
Republican	Judy Koehler	1,053,734	33.74%	−8.76%
Illinois Solidarity	Einar V. Dyhrkopp	15,804	0.51%	
Libertarian	Donald M. Parrish, Jr.	13,891	0.44%	−0.20%
Socialist Workers	Omari Musa	5,671	0.18%	+0.12%
Total votes		3,122,833	100	
Democratic hold		Swing		

1992 United States Senate election in Illinois Democratic primary
Party	Candidate	Votes	%
Democratic	Carol Moseley Braun	557,694	38.3%
Democratic	Alan J. Dixon (incumbent)	504,077	34.6%
Democratic	Albert Hofeld	394,497	27.1%
Total votes		1,456,268	100.0%

Political offices
Preceded by Adlai Stevenson III	Treasurer of Illinois; 1971–1977	Succeeded by Donald R. Smith
Preceded by Michael Howlett	Secretary of State of Illinois; 1977–1981	Succeeded by Jim Edgar
U.S. Senate
Preceded by Adlai Stevenson III	U.S. Senator (Class 3) from Illinois; 1981–1993; Served alongside: Charles H. Percy, Paul Simon	Succeeded by Carol Moseley Braun
Party political offices
Preceded by Adlai Stevenson III	Democratic nominee for Treasurer of Illinois; 1970, 1974	Succeeded by Jerome Cosentino
Preceded by Michael Howlett	Democratic nominee for Secretary of State of Illinois; 1976, 1978	Succeeded by Jerome Cosentino
Preceded by Adlai Stevenson III	Democratic nominee for U.S. Senator from Illinois (Class 3); 1980, 1986	Succeeded by Carol Moseley Braun
New office	Senate Democratic Chief Deputy Whip; 1989–1993	Succeeded by John Breaux
