= 1978 Illinois State Comptroller election =

- November 7, 1978
- Turnout: 51.40%
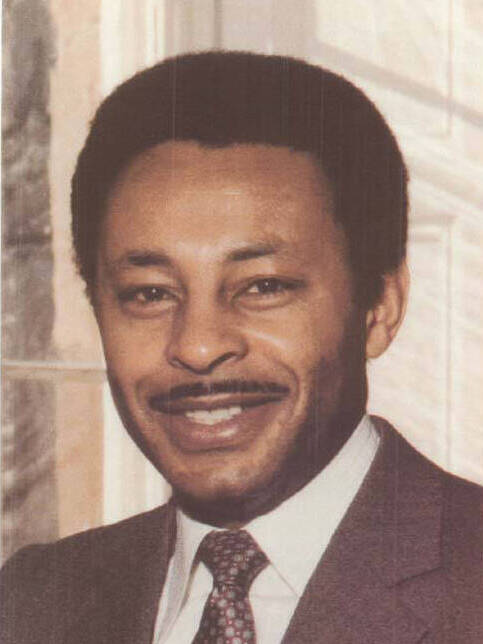

Nominee	Roland Burris	John W. Castle
Party	Democratic	Republican
Popular vote	1,542,983	1,389,049
Percentage	51.67%	46.52%
- County results Burris: 40–50% 50–60% 60–70% Castle: 40–50% 50–60% 60–70% 70–80%
State Comptroller before election
Michael Bakalis
Democratic
Elected State Comptroller
Roland Burris
Democratic

Incumbent Comptroller Michael Bakalis, a Democrat, did not seek a second term, instead opting to run for governor. Democrat Roland Burris was elected to succeed him. In winning the election, Burris became the first American American to be elected to statewide office in Illinois.

== Democratic primary ==
With more than 64% of the vote, Roland Burris defeated State Representative Richard Luft in the Democratic primary.

Burris was a Chicago attorney that had formerly served as director of the Department of General Services under Governor Dan Walker. Luft had been the early favorite for the party to slate, but at the last minute was beaten out by Burris when the party finally slated candidates. It was reported that black Chicago Democrats had pressured the party to slate a black candidate for statewide office.

During the campaign, Burris and Luft argued over Burris' record as director of the Department of General Services.

Comptroller Democratic primary
Party	Candidate	Votes	%
Democratic	Roland W. Burris	418,735	64.03
Democratic	Richard N. Luft	235,192	35.97
Total votes		653,927	100

== Republican primary ==
With more than 52% of the vote, John W. Castle, director of the Department of Local Government Affairs, defeated W. Robert Blair, former Speaker of the Illinois House of Representatives, in the Republican primary. Governor James R. Thompson, who had convinced Castle to abandon his declared plans to run for treasurer and instead run for comptroller, publicly endorsed Castle. Blair criticized Castle for this endorsement, alleging that he would not be able to operate the comptroller's office independently of the governor, while Castle denied that his decisions would be influenced by his political ties to Thompson.

Comptroller Republican primary
Party	Candidate	Votes	%
Republican	John W. Castle	238,086	52.02
Republican	W. Robert Blair	219,570	47.98
Write-in	Others	2	0.00
Total votes		457,656	100

== General election ==
Comptroller election
Party	Candidate	Votes	%
Democratic	Roland W. Burris	1,542,983	51.67
Republican	John W. Castle	1,389,049	46.52
Libertarian	Mark B. Wallace	21,645	0.72
Socialist Workers	John Eriksen	17,116	0.57
U.S. Labor	Carol Leebove	15,181	0.51
Write-in	Others	14	0.00
Total votes		2,985,988	100
