= Jerome Cosentino =

American politician

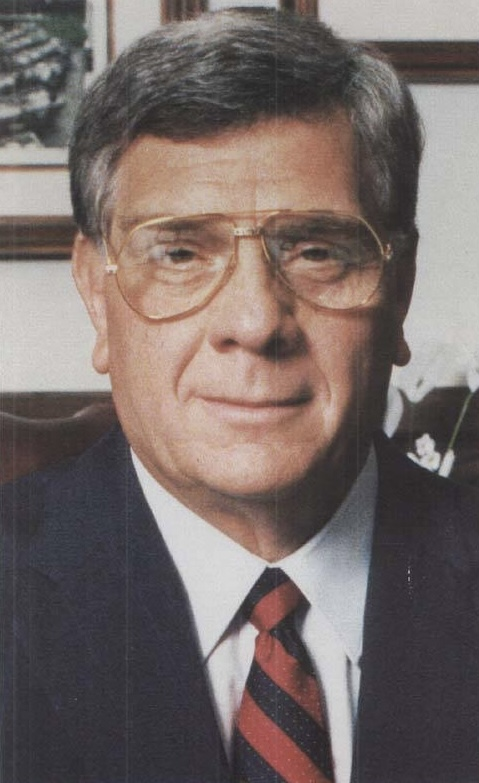
- Constentino, circa 1989

67th and 69th Treasurer of Illinois
- In office January 12, 1987 – January 14, 1991
- Governor: Jim Thompson
- Preceded by: James Donnewald
- Succeeded by: Pat Quinn
- In office January 8, 1979 – January 10, 1983
- Governor: Jim Thompson
- Preceded by: Donald R. Smith
- Succeeded by: James Donnewald

Personal details
- Born: June 13, 1931 Chicago, Illinois, U.S.
- Died: April 3, 1997 (aged 65) Naples, Florida, U.S.
- Party: Democratic

Jerome "Jerry" Cosentino (June 13, 1931 – April 3, 1997) was an American politician from the state of Illinois. He was a Democrat who served as state Treasurer from 1979 until 1983, and again from 1987 until 1991.

== Life and politics ==
Cosentino was born in Chicago. A trucker, he owned Fast Motor Service, a transport company. His first elective office was Metropolitan Sanitary District Commissioner in Cook County, an office he held from 1975 to 1979. Cosentino also held partisan offices, serving as the Democratic committeeman of Palos Township and as a member of the state central committee of the Illinois Democratic Party.

Cosentino was elected to the office of Illinois Treasurer in November 1978, becoming the first Italian-American to be elected to statewide office in Illinois. In 1982, Cosentino did not seek renomination for his position, electing instead to run for the post of Illinois Secretary of State; he lost to Jim Edgar. After four years in the private sector, Cosentino again sought the office of state Treasurer and was re-elected in November 1986, eventually serving two nonconsecutive terms in this position.

In November 1990, Cosentino ran again for Secretary of State, losing to George Ryan. After leaving office in January 1991, the former state treasurer was indicted for bank fraud. He pleaded guilty to this offense in April 1992, and was sentenced to serve nine months in home confinement. Upon completing this sentence, the former official left Illinois and moved to Naples, Florida, where he died.

Party political offices
Preceded by Alan J. Dixon	Democratic nominee for Treasurer of Illinois; 1978	Succeeded by James Donnewald
Preceded by Alan J. Dixon	Democratic nominee for Secretary of State of Illinois; 1982	Succeeded by Janice Hart
Preceded by James Donnewald	Democratic nominee for Treasurer of Illinois; 1986	Succeeded by Pat Quinn
Preceded by Janice Hart	Democratic nominee for Secretary of State of Illinois; 1990	Succeeded by Pat Quinn
