= Jessica Dixon Heitman =

American politician in Illinois

- Dixon Heitman speaking in 2026

Member of the Illinois House of Representatives from the 97th district
- Incumbent
- Assumed office July 20, 2026
- Preceded by: Harry Benton

Personal details
- Born: Jessica Suzanne Dixon
- Party: Democratic
- Spouse: Scott Heitman
- Relatives: Alan J. Dixon (grandfather)
- Education: University of Missouri

Jessica Suzanne Dixon Heitman is an American politician who has served as a member of Illinois House of Representatives from the 97th district since July 20, 2026. She replaced Harry Benton, who resigned due to an internal ethics investigation.

== Early life and education ==
Dixon Heitman is the granddaughter of Alan J. Dixon, who served as a member of the U.S. Senate from Illinois from 1981 to 1993, and her parents, Stacy and Jeff, ran a public relations and government affairs firm. She holds a bachelor’s degree in communications and English from the University of Missouri.

== Career ==
Dixon Heitman worked as an independent contractor in state representative Harry Benton's office from January 2023 to May 2023. She is president of communications firm Dixon / Heitman Collective and has worked in communications including media relations in both chambers of the Illinois State Legislature.

Following Benton's resignation due to an internal ethics investigation in July 2026, Dixon Heitman was selected by the local Democratic Parties in Will and Kendall counties to replace him in the legislature and on the ballot in the November general election.

== Personal life ==
Dixon Heitman and her husband, Scott, who grew up in Shorewood, moved from Chicago to Plainfield in July of 2018. They have three daughters and a labradoodle.
