= 1984 United States Senate election in Illinois =

- November 6, 1984
- Turnout: 73.99%
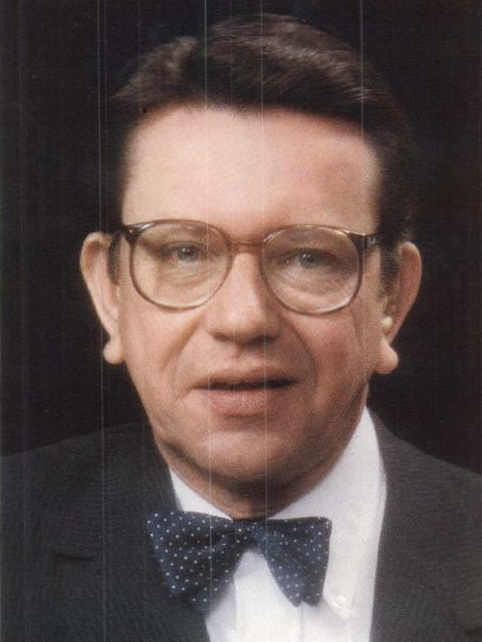

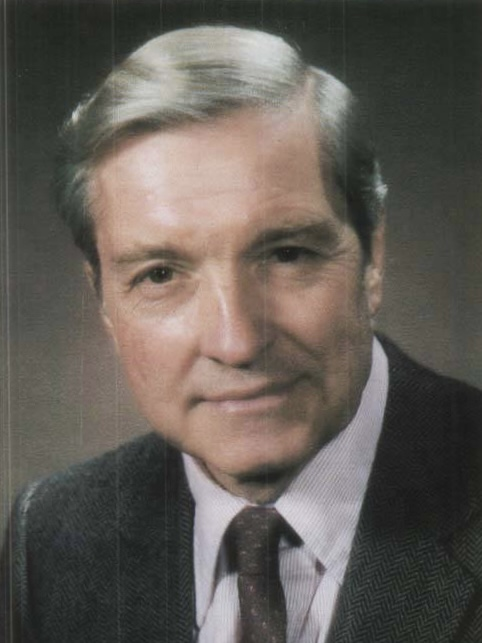
Nominee	Paul Simon	Charles Percy
Party	Democratic	Republican
Popular vote	2,397,165	2,308,039
Percentage	50.07%	48.21%
- Simon: 40–50% 50–60% 60–70% 70–80% 80–90% <90% Percy: 40–50% 50–60% 60–70% 70–80% 80–90% Tie: 50% No data
U.S. senator before election
Charles H. Percy
Republican
Elected U.S. Senator
Paul Simon
Democratic

The 1984 United States Senate election in Illinois took place on November 6, 1984. Incumbent Republican Senator Charles H. Percy ran for re-election to a fourth term. He was opposed by Democratic nominee Paul Simon, who was a United States Congressman from Illinois's 22nd congressional district. The campaign between Percy and Simon was contentious and brutally fought, and ended up with Simon ousting Percy by fewer than 90,000 votes, which was, at the time, considered an upset. Incidentally, Percy's son-in-law Jay Rockefeller was elected Senator from West Virginia in the same election cycle. This is the most recent election for this seat in Illinois where both candidates are deceased.

Despite Simon's narrow win, Ronald Reagan carried Illinois in a landslide in the concurrent presidential election.

== Background ==
The election coincided with those for other federal offices (president and House), as well as state elections.

The primaries were held March 20. Turnout in the primaries was 36.67%, with a total of 2,219,583 votes cast.

Turnout in the general election was 73.99%, with 4,787,335 votes cast.

== Democratic primary ==
=== Candidates ===
- Roland Burris, Illinois State Comptroller
- Philip J. Rock, state senator from Oak Park
- Gerald M. Rose, member of the LaRouche movement
- Alex Seith, nominee for Senate in 1978 and candidate in 1980
- Paul Simon, U.S. Representative from Makanda

=== Results ===
1984 Democratic Senate primary
Party	Candidate	Votes	%
Democratic	Paul Simon	556,757	35.56
Democratic	Roland W. Burris	360,182	23.01
Democratic	Alex Seith	327,125	20.90
Democratic	Philip J. Rock	303,397	19.38
Democratic	Gerald M. Rose	17,985	1.15
Write-in		49	0.00
Total votes		1,565,495	100.00

== Republican primary ==
=== Candidates ===
- Richard J. Castic
- Tom Corcoran, U.S. Representative from Ottawa
- V. A. Kelley
- Charles H. Percy, incumbent senator since 1967
- John E. Roche, candidate for governor in 1982

=== Results ===
1984 Republican Senate primary
Party	Candidate	Votes	%
Republican	Charles H. Percy (incumbent)	387,865	59.30
Republican	Tom Corcoran	239,847	36.67
Republican	John E. Roche	13,533	2.07
Republican	V. A. Kelley	9,236	1.41
Republican	Richard J. Castic	3,607	0.55
Write-in		45	0.01
Total votes		654,088	100.00

== General election ==
=== Predictions ===
Source	Rating	As of
The Cook Political Report	Toss Up	September 19, 1984

=== Candidates ===
- Ishmael Flory, perennial candidate (Communist)
- Steve I. Givot (Libertarian)
- Nelson Gonzalez (Socialist Workers)
- Charles H. Percy, incumbent U.S. Senator since 1967 (Republican)
- Marjorie H. Pries (Independent)
- Paul Simon, U.S. Representative from Makanda (Democratic)

=== Results ===
The election was very close. Simon prevailed by only 89,126 votes, or 1.86%. Incumbent Percy did well throughout the state, including the Chicago collar counties. Nevertheless, in the heavily populated and Democratic Cook County, which encompasses the city of Chicago and the majority of the Chicago Metropolitan Area, Simon ran ahead of Percy by over 300,000 votes. Simon also won most counties in southwestern Illinois, a traditionally Democratic region. Percy led early on and well into the night, but as Cook County began to count all of its votes, Simon pulled ahead. Simon won despite then-president Reagan winning the state easily. Percy called Simon at around 5 A.M. the next day and conceded. Percy also congratulated Simon on his hard-earned victory. Simon was sworn in on January 3, 1985, and served in the Senate until January 3, 1997, when he retired. Simon was later succeeded by Dick Durbin, a close friend and fellow Democrat.

United States Senate election in Illinois, 1984
Party	Candidate	Votes	%	±%
Democratic	Paul Simon	2,397,165	50.07%	▲4.60
Republican	Charles Percy (incumbent)	2,308,039	48.21%	▼5.13
Libertarian	Steve I. Givot	59,777	1.25%	▲0.74
Citizens	Marjorie H. Pries	12,366	0.26%	N/A
Socialist Workers	Nelson Gonzalez	4,913	0.10%	▼0.40
Communist	Ishmael Flory	4,802	0.10%	N/A
Write-in		273	0.01%	▲0.01
Majority		89,126	1.86%	▼6.00
Turnout		4,787,335	73.99%	
Democratic gain from Republican		Swing		

== See also ==
- 1984 United States Senate elections
