= Richard Luft =

American politician (1938–2023)

Richard Nelson Luft (March 14, 1938 – August 18, 2023) was an American politician.

== Life and career ==
Born in Pekin, Illinois, Luft received his bachelor's degree in political science and his master's degree in public administration from Sangamon State University. From 1975 to 1979, Luft served in the Illinois House of Representatives and was a Democrat. He then served in the Illinois State Senate from 1983 until he resigned in 1993. During his legislative tenure, he served on the central committee for the Democratic Party of Illinois as one of two committee members from what was then Illinois's 18th congressional district with Shirley McCombs. In May 1993, Luft was appointed commissioner of the Illinois Department of Banks and Trust. He was succeeded in the Illinois Senate by then-Peoria County Sheriff George Shadid.

Luft unsuccessfully sought the Democratic nomination for Illinois Comptroller in 1978, losing to Roland Burris.

Richard Luft died on August 18, 2023, at the age of 85.
