= Alex Seith =

American politician

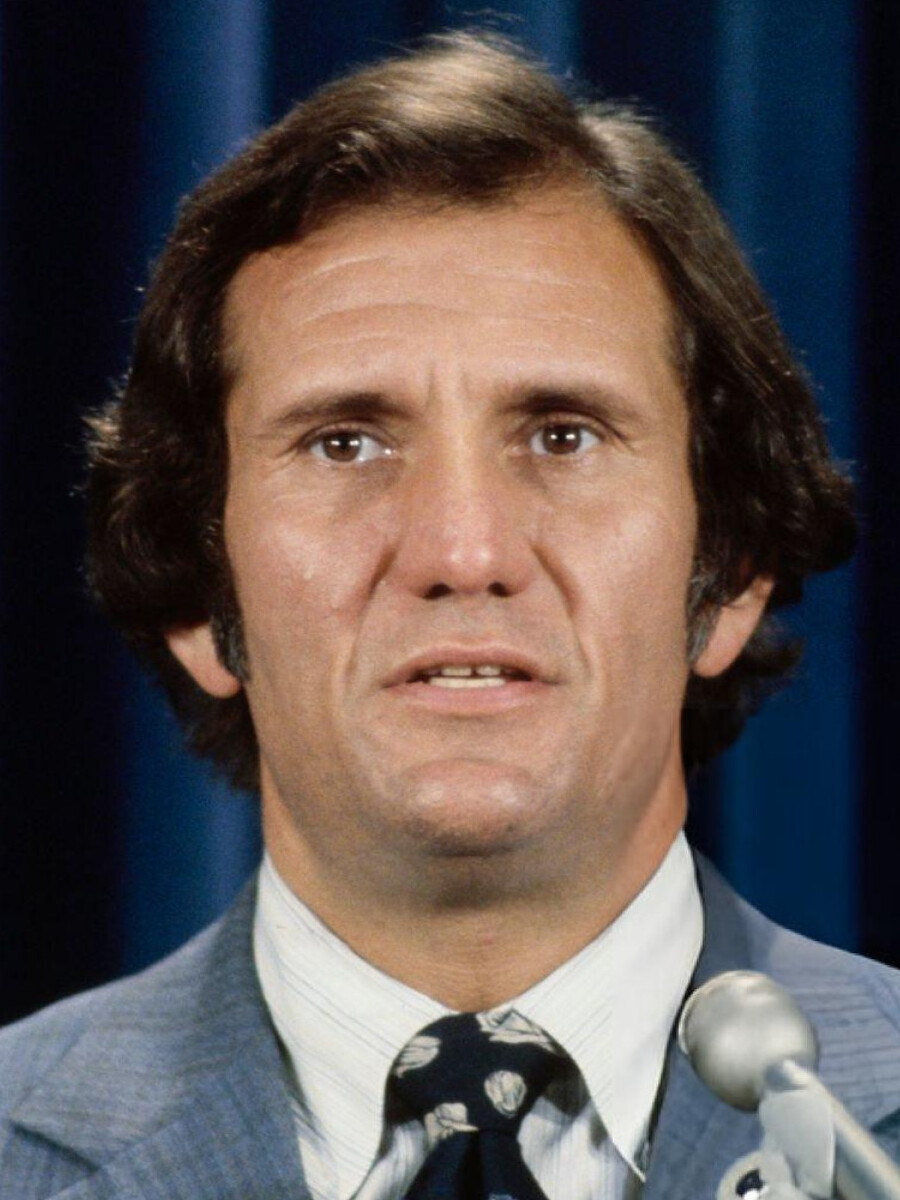
Seith in 1978

Alex Robert Seith (July 27, 1934 – March 23, 2010) was the 1978 nominee of the Democratic Party for the United States Senate from Illinois. A complete newcomer to electoral politics, he nearly pulled off one of the greatest upsets in Senate history when he narrowly lost to nationally renowned incumbent Republican politician Charles Percy by eight percentage points. According to Statistics of Congressional Election of November 7, 1978, (Washington: U.S. Government Printing Office, 1978) the margin of defeat was 250,000 votes. Seith went to Yale University and Harvard Law School.

== Before politics ==
Prior to running for the Senate, Seith's political career had been limited to appointed positions, including service on a regional sanitary district board and, most notably, the Cook County Zoning Board of Appeals. Though at heart a mainstream member of the Democratic Party, with associated positions on most issues, Seith's campaign emphasized his hard line positions in foreign policy. Percy managed to salvage his office by means of a televised mea culpa in the final week of the campaign, but Seith's campaign may have been dealt a blow some days earlier, when popular Chicago Sun-Times columnist Mike Royko informed readers that Seith had served as a character witness in the trial of a mob figure some years earlier.

== Runs for political office ==
Seith unsuccessfully sought the Democratic nomination for Illinois' other U.S. Senate seat in 1980, but was defeated by Illinois Secretary of State Alan J. Dixon, who went on to win the general election.

Seith unsuccessfully sought the Democratic nomination for U.S. Senate in 1984, but was defeated by Congressman Paul Simon, who went on to narrowly defeat Percy in the general election.

== Later life ==
Seith later went on to co-own a number of radio stations with Thom Serafin, including WSDR/WSSQ in Sterling, Illinois. They also owned the Illinois News Network, a statewide radio network.

Throughout the late 1980s and early 1990s he provided on air commentaries for WLS (Channel 7) television in Chicago, the ABC network affiliate.

In his later life, Seith lived and worked in Chicago, where he was an attorney and lobbyist, specializing in real-estate law.

Party political offices
Preceded by Roman Pucinski	Democratic nominee for U.S. Senator from Illinois (Class 2); 1978	Succeeded by Paul Simon
