= Andy Martin =

American politician (born 1945)

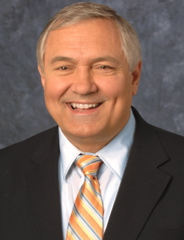
- Martin in 2011

Personal details
- Born: Anthony Robert Martin-Trigona; 1945 (age 80–81) Middletown, Connecticut, U.S.
- Party: Democratic (Before 1986, 1988–1990); Republican (1986–1988, 1990–present)
- Education: University of Illinois, Urbana– Champaign

Anthony Robert Martin-Trigona, usually known as Andy Martin (born 1945), is an American perennial candidate who has never been elected to office, running as both a Democrat and a Republican.

He is a vexatious litigant who has filed over 250 political lawsuits nationwide. In Connecticut, a federal judge once banned Martin from filing lawsuits in any court in the nation without a judge's permission. The federal judge said Martin considered filing lawsuits to be a "veritable sport."

The Nation, The Washington Post, and The New York Times identified Martin as the primary source of false rumors that then-presidential candidate Barack Obama was secretly a Muslim during the 2008 presidential election (an allegation Martin had made as early as 2004). In a later interview with CNN, Martin explicitly abandoned this view and now asserts Obama's real father is not Barack Obama Sr., but African-American journalist Frank Marshall Davis.

On October 17, 2008, Martin filed a lawsuit against the state of Hawaii, calling for the public release of Obama's birth certificate and other vital records. At the time, conspiracy theories postulated that Obama was not a natural-born citizen of the United States. Obama had previously posted an image of his short-form birth certificate online. Martin's lawsuit sought a copy of Obama's long-form birth certificate. On November 19, the Supreme Court of Hawaii dismissed Martin's lawsuit.

== Early life ==
Martin was born in 1945 in Middletown, Connecticut. His father, Ralph Beneducci Martin-Trigona, was of Italian, Maltese, and English descent, and his mother, Helen Anthony (née Vasiliou), was Greek American. He received a Bachelor of Arts from the University of Illinois at Urbana–Champaign in 1966, and a Juris Doctor from that institution in 1969.

== Career ==
In 1973, the Illinois Supreme Court refused to grant Martin a license to practice law in the state due to such conduct as attempting to have a parking violation thrown out because it had been "entered by an insane judge" and for commenting that an attorney, who suffers from a mild case of cerebral palsy, was "shaking and tottering and drooling like an idiot." The court also cited Martin's Selective Service record, which attributed to him "a moderately severe character defect manifested by well-documented ideation with a paranoid flavor and a grandiose character."

Martin then became involved in consumer advocacy and referred to himself as "the people's attorney general". He claimed to be the first to file antitrust cases against the Big Three television networks for anticompetitive practices in network affiliation agreements and the first to bring a lawsuit under the civil component of the Racketeer Influenced and Corrupt Organizations Act (RICO).

=== Political campaigns ===
Martin grew up as a Democrat and served as an intern to Senator Paul Douglas in the summer of 1966. In 1977, he ran in a special election for Mayor of Chicago, but lost in the Democratic primary to acting mayor Michael A. Bilandic, receiving less than 3% of the vote.

Over the years, Martin has run in various elections in Connecticut, Florida, and Illinois as a Democrat, a Republican, and an independent. Among them:

- 1977 Chicago mayoral special election (Democratic primary)
- 1978 United States Senate election in Illinois (Democratic primary)
- 1980 United States Senate election in Illinois (Democratic primary)
- Connecticut's 3rd congressional district election, 1986 (Democratic primary)
- President of the United States, 1988 (Democratic primary)
- 1990 Florida gubernatorial election (Republican primary) - 4th of five candidates, 28,591 votes (4.30%)
- U.S. House from Florida, 1992 (Republican primary)
- Florida State Senate, 1996 (unsuccessful Republican nominee)
- 1998 United States Senate election in Florida (Republican primary) - 2nd of two candidates, 184,739 votes (33.60%)
- President of the United States, 2000 (Republican primary)
- 2000 United States Senate election in Florida (unsuccessful independent candidate) - 7th of seven candidates, 15,889 votes (0.27%)
- 2006 Illinois gubernatorial election (Republican primary) - 5th of five candidates, 6,095 votes (0.83%)
- 2008 United States Senate election in Illinois (Republican primary) - 2nd of three candidates, 240,548 votes (33.85%)
- 2010 United States Senate elections in Illinois (Republican primary) - 5th of six candidates, 37,359 votes (5.0%)
- 2012 New Hampshire Republican presidential primary - only 19 votes.
- 2014 United States Senate election in New Hampshire (Republican primary) - 7th of 10 candidates, 734 votes (0.67%)
- 2016 New Hampshire Republican presidential primary
- 2018 United States House of Representatives elections in New Hampshire, 1st district (Republican primary) 3rd of 6 candidates, 2,072 (4.2%)
- 2020 United States Senate election in New Hampshire, (Republican primary), 3rd of 4 candidates, 6,443 votes (4.6%)
- 2022 United States Senate election in New Hampshire, (Republican primary), 7th of 11 candidates, 920 votes
- 2024 United States House of Representatives elections in New Hampshire, 1st district (Republican primary)

=== 1996 ===
Martin's 1996 run for the Florida State Senate unraveled when it was revealed that he had named his campaign committee for his 1986 congressional run "The Anthony R. Martin-Trigona Congressional Campaign to Exterminate Jew Power in America." The revelation led the state Republican Party to renounce him.

Just before the election, Martin assaulted two camerapersons from WPTV, the NBC affiliate in West Palm Beach, while they were interviewing him at the TV station. At the trial, he arrived late and used the dais to address the television cameras. He then refused to continue the trial with a judge who had been "bought and paid for". The judge immediately held Martin in criminal contempt of court and ordered him jailed for one month.

On the assault charge, he was convicted of criminal mischief and sentenced to a year in jail. However, when he was let out of jail for the contempt charge after serving one month, he was not re-incarcerated for the assault charge, due to a "paperwork glitch".

Martin never returned to serve out the remainder of his term, and an arrest warrant was issued for his arrest, making him subject to having to serve 16 months in jail. The warrant was still outstanding as of the time of Martin's 2008 Senate run, but Martin said the issue was being "resolved."

=== 2000 ===
During Martin's 2000 run for president, he accused George W. Bush of using cocaine. In 2003, several months before Saddam Hussein was captured, Martin claimed to have found the former Iraqi dictator's hideout.

=== 2010 ===
Martin was a 2010 Republican candidate for U.S. Senate in Illinois for the seat being vacated by Senator Roland Burris. In December 2009, Martin ran radio ads which included Martin requesting that one of his primary opponents, Congressman Mark Kirk, answer claims about his sexuality made by Jack Roeser, a radio talk show host. Another ad alleged that Kirk, as well as former House Speaker Dennis Hastert, had always known of fellow Congressman Mark Foley's relationship with a former page, and had done "nothing to stop Foley's pedophilia, for years", and said, that by extension, Kirk was "a de facto pedophile". In response, the state Republican Party announced that Martin would no longer be recognized as a legitimate candidate. Martin received 37,359 votes, five percent of the total votes. He attempted to run for the U.S. Senate in the general election as a member of the Reform Party of Illinois, but he did not qualify for the ballot.

=== Litigation and antisemitic allegations ===
Over the years, Martin has filed numerous lawsuits, and was labeled as a vexatious litigant by Edward Weinfeld, a federal judge for the United States District Court for the Southern District of New York, who observed that Martin tended to file "a substantial number of lawsuits of a vexatious, frivolous and scandalous nature." A number of these filings were allegedly antisemitic in nature. In a 1983 bankruptcy case, Martin filed a motion calling the presiding judge "a crooked, slimy Jew who has a history of lying and thieving common to members of his race." In another motion that year, Martin stated, "I am able to understand how the Holocaust took place, and with every passing day feel less and less sorry that it did." He went on to say that "Jew survivors are operating as a wolf pack to steal my property." When later pressed in an interview about his remarks, Martin claimed that the antisemitic comments were inserted into his court papers by malicious judges.

In 1983, José A. Cabranes, a federal judge for the United States District Court for the District of Connecticut, issued a sweeping injunction barring Martin or anyone acting "at his behest, at his direction or instigation, or in concert with him" from filing any new action or proceeding in any federal or state court without first seeking permission from the court in which he wished to file that action or proceeding. In his ruling, Cabranes noted that Martin tended to file legal actions with "persistence, viciousness, and general disregard for decency and logic." According to Cabranes, Martin's practice was to file "an incessant stream of frivolous or meritless motions, demands, letters to the court and other documents," as well as "vexatious lawsuits" against anyone who dared cross him, including court personnel and their families. For instance, during the proceedings, Martin sued Cabranes himself, along with the judge's wife. Martin then sought, unsuccessfully, to have Cabranes recused.

On appeal from Cabranes's ruling, the United States Court of Appeals for the Second Circuit limited the scope of the injunction to federal courts, but stated that the federal courts were constitutionally obligated to protect themselves and the administration of justice from vexatious litigants like Martin.

Since then, Martin has continued his pattern of filing legal actions. He has repeatedly been cited for contempt for violating the federal injunction. The United States District Court for the Southern District of Florida estimated that he has filed thousands of proceedings over the years. In 1993, the United States Court of Appeals for the Eleventh Circuit determined that his mother was acting in concert with him by filing a federal civil rights action against several Florida state officials. The court noted similar wording in the suit filed by Martin's mother and a petition filed by Martin himself. In throwing out the suit, the Eleventh Circuit called Martin "a notoriously vexatious and vindictive litigator who has long abused the American legal system." Most recently, a libel and invasion of privacy suit against Media Matters for America and its founder, David Brock, was dismissed with prejudice because Martin had violated the terms of the injunction.

Martin has also been sanctioned at the state level. He is banned from seeking indigent status in Florida courts due to his history of filing abusive petitions. Martin is also prohibited from filing lawsuits in New York, unless represented by an attorney or with the court's prior approval.

In November 2015, Martin filed a challenge to the appearance of Bernie Sanders on the New Hampshire ballot for the Democratic primary. The challenge was unsuccessful, but Martin announced plans to appeal to the New Hampshire Supreme Court.

== Role in rumors about Obama ==
=== Allegations of Obama being a Muslim ===
According to a report by journalist Chris Hayes for The Nation, Martin issued a press release shortly after Obama's keynote speech at the 2004 Democratic National Convention that he had evidence Obama "lied to the American people" and "misrepresent[ed] his own heritage." Martin claimed that Obama was really a Muslim, was possibly hiding this fact "to endanger Israel," and that "[Obama's] Muslim religion would obviously raise serious questions in many Jewish circles."

Within a few days, the conservative site Free Republic picked up Martin's press release, triggering a long discussion. However, according to Hayes, the issue went dormant after Obama's election to the Senate, only to pick up again in 2006 as rumors spread that Obama was considering a presidential run. In October, a conservative blog, Infidel Bloggers Alliance, reposted Martin's press release in response to a question about Obama's heritage. Then, on December 26, conservative activist Ted Sampley, co-founder of Vietnam Veterans Against John Kerry, posted a column suggesting Obama was a closeted Muslim, heavily quoting Martin's original press release.

According to Hayes, the first of many emails suggesting Obama was a Muslim was forwarded to Snopes within hours of Sampley's story. Hayes believes that the email was likely a slightly altered version of the Sampley article, which was in turn heavily based on Martin's 2004 press release. Martin told Hayes that he got numerous calls once the emails began circulating. When the callers asked him if he wrote the release, Martin replied, "They are all my children."

On June 28, 2008, Martin told The Washington Post that he wasn't "trying to smear anybody," but that it was "just an underreported story."

Jerome Corsi's book The Obama Nation, published on August 1, 2008, opens with a quote from Martin on Obama's alleged Muslim heritage and supposed attempts to conceal it. In October, Jim Rutenberg of The New York Times wrote that the book had been "widely discredited".

On October 5, 2008, Martin was featured as a "journalist" on Hannity's America of the Fox News Channel. According to The New York Times, "The program allowed Mr. Martin to assert falsely and without challenge that Mr. Obama had once trained to overthrow the government." In a subsequent appearance on Hannity & Colmes, Robert Gibbs, Obama's communications director, criticized Hannity for allowing Martin to appear on the show.

Then-Fox Senior Vice President Bill Shine later retracted support for Martin as a guest: "Having that guy on was a mistake. We obviously didn't do enough research on who the guest was."

=== Allegations of Obama's father being Frank Marshall Davis ===
In an interview featured on the CNN network's American Morning program on October 27, 2008, Martin explicitly abandoned his view that Barack Obama is a Muslim. In the interview, Martin said that Obama was not the son of Barack Obama Sr., but rather the son of Frank Marshall Davis, an African American journalist and political activist who wrote for a newspaper in Hawaii in the 1940s and 1950s that was accused by the House Un-American Activities Committee of being a front for the Communist Party USA. Martin claimed that he discovered this after a recent trip to Honolulu, although he offered CNN no substantive proof for the claim.

=== Lawsuit against the state of Hawaii ===
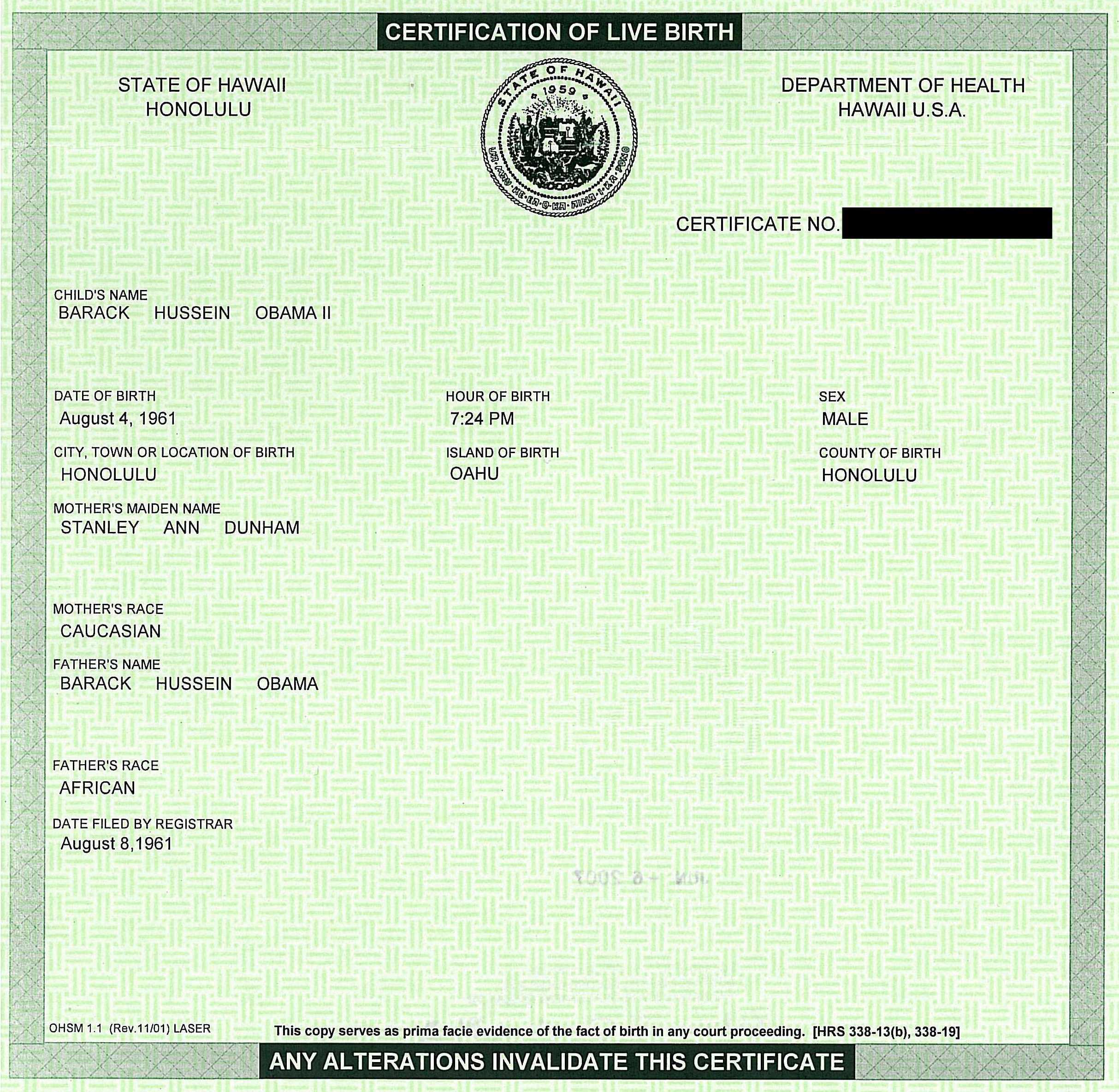
President Barack Obama's short-form birth certificate

On October 17, 2008, Martin filed a lawsuit in a state circuit court of Hawaii against Governor Linda Lingle and state health department director Dr. Chiyome Fukino, seeking to verify the state's official birth certificate for Obama. Months before this suit, the Obama campaign posted an image of his short-form birth certificate online. Martin's lawsuit sought to order the state to release a copy of Obama's long-form birth certificate.

The short-form birth certificate that the Obama campaign posted online stated that his date of birth as August 4, 1961, his place of birth as Honolulu, Hawaii, and other details. Martin was quoted as saying, "I want to see a certified copy issued by the state of Hawai'i, not one issued by the state of Obama."

Hawaii State Department and Health spokeswoman Janice Okubo stated that only people with a "tangible relationship" to a person can access a copy of the person's birth certificate, adding that a 1949 law "was enacted primarily to protect your private information, especially in these days where there's ID theft." Attorney General Mark Bennett said that he had not seen the lawsuit and could not comment on it, but said that according to Hawaii Revised Statutes it is unlawful to release vital records to anyone except individuals listed in state records as having close relations with Obama (that is, a spouse, parents, descendants, or someone with a common ancestor). In regard to a designee representing Obama, Okubo says "If someone from Obama's campaign gave us permission in person and presented some kind of verification that he or she was Obama's designee, we could release the vital record."

On October 22, 2008, in a Honolulu court proceeding overseen by the Honorable Bert I. Ayabe of the First Circuit of the Supreme Court of Hawaii, the court denied Martin's petition for a writ of mandamus to order the release of Obama's vital records. A further hearing was held on November 18. On November 19, the court denied Martin's "emergency motion" and dismissed Martin's lawsuit, based on Martin's lack of legal standing to obtain another person's birth document.

On April 27, 2011, White House staffers gave reporters a copy of the official long-form certificate, and posted a PDF image of the certificate on the White House website. The certificate reconfirmed the information on the official short-form certificate released in 2008, and provided additional details such as the name of the hospital where Obama was born.
