= 1978 United States Senate election in Illinois =

- November 7, 1978
- Turnout: 54.82%
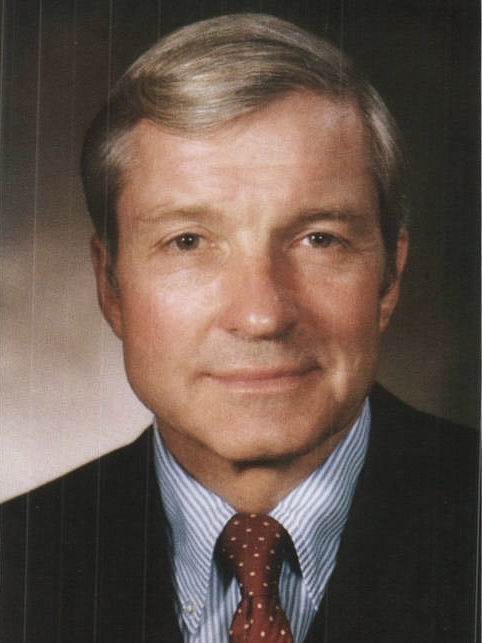

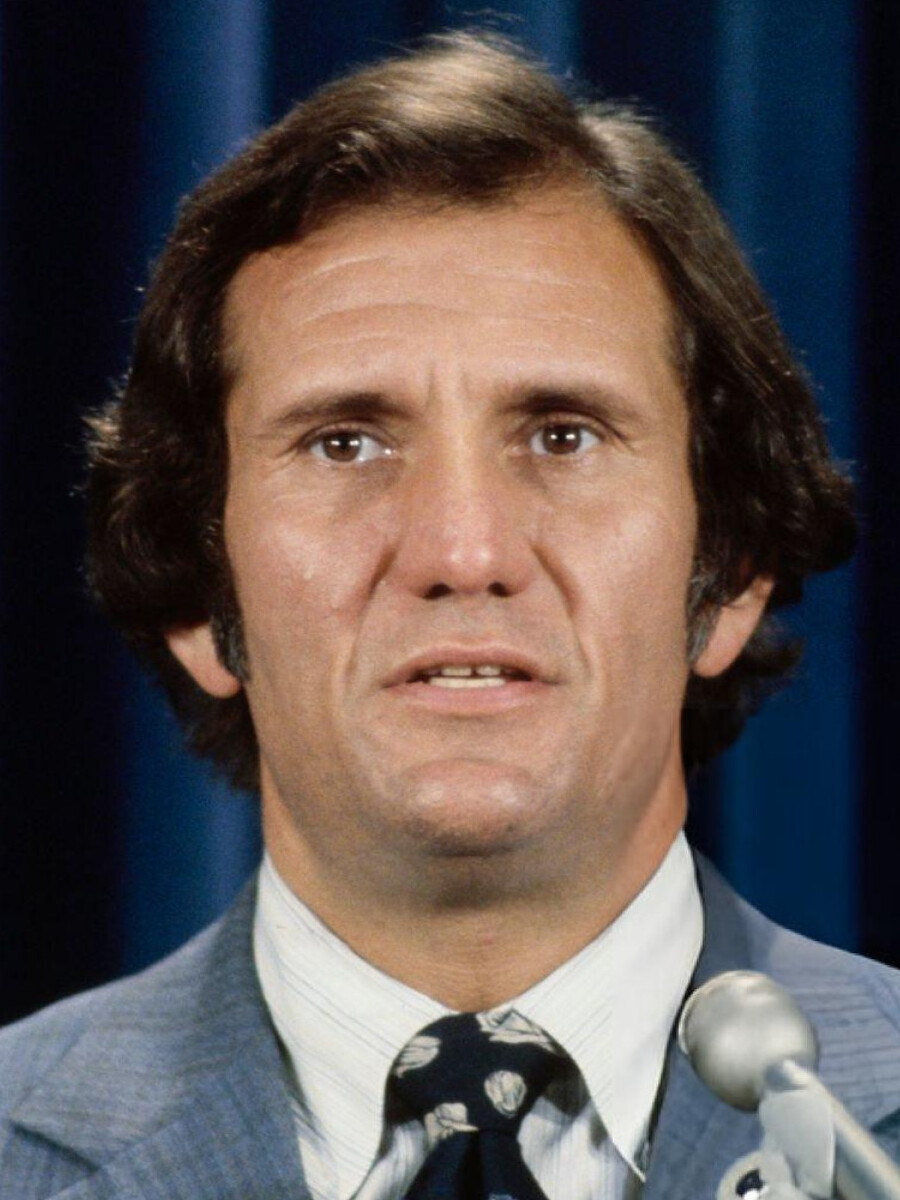
Nominee	Charles Percy	Alex Seith
Party	Republican	Democratic
Popular vote	1,698,711	1,448,187
Percentage	53.34%	45.47%
- County results Percy: 40–50% 50–60% 60–70% Seith: 50–60% 60–70%
U.S. senator before election
Charles H. Percy
Republican
Elected U.S. Senator
Charles H. Percy
Republican

The 1978 United States Senate election in Illinois took place on November 7, 1978. Incumbent Republican United States Senator Charles H. Percy ran for re-election to a third term in the United States Senate. Percy was opposed by Democratic nominee Alex Seith, an attorney who had been appointed to several local government positions.

Though Percy had been originally been expected to have an easy reelection over Seith, a first-time candidate, the election quickly became competitive.

As of 2023, this was the last time the Republicans won the Class 2 Senate seat in Illinois, and also the last time a Republican Senate candidate has carried Cook County.

== Background ==
The primary (held on March 21) and general election coincided with those for House and state elections.

Turnout in the primaries was 19.88%, with a total of 1,171,744 votes cast.

Turnout during the general election was 54.82%, with 3,184,764 votes cast.

== Democratic primary ==
=== Candidates ===
- Anthony R. Martin-Trigona, political activist
- Alex Seith, Chairman of the Cook County Zoning Board of Appeals

=== Results ===
Democratic primary results
Party	Candidate	Votes	%
Democratic	Alex Seith	483,196	69.49
Democratic	Anthony R. Martin-Trigona	212,105	30.51
Write-in		11	0.00
Total votes		695,312	100.00

== Republican primary ==
=== Candidates ===
- Lawrence Joseph Sarsfield Daly, perennial candidate
- Charles H. Percy, incumbent

Declined

- Phyllis Schlafly, anti-ERA activist

=== Results ===
Republican primary results
Party	Candidate	Votes	%
Republican	Charles H. Percy (incumbent)	401,409	84.25
Republican	Lar "America First" Daly	74,739	15.69
Write-in		284	0.06
Total votes		476,432	100.00

== General election ==
=== Candidates ===
- Bruce Lee Green (Libertarian)
- Patricia Grogan (Socialist Workers)
- Charles H. Percy, incumbent (Republican)
- Gerald Rose (Socialist Labor)
- Alex Seith, Chairman of the Cook County Zoning Board of Appeals (Democratic)

=== Campaign ===
Though Percy had been expected to coast to re-election over Seith, a first-time candidate, the election quickly became competitive. In the last few days of the campaign, a desperate Percy ran a television advertisement that featured him apologizing and acknowledging that, "I got your message and you're right." Percy's last-ditch effort appeared to have paid off, as he was able to edge out Seith to win what would end up being his third and final term in the Senate.

=== Results ===
According to an NBC News exit poll, Percy won 50% of black voters, 54% of voters 35 years old or younger, and 58% of Jewish voters.

United States Senate election in Illinois, 1978
Party	Candidate	Votes	%	±%
Republican	Charles H. Percy (incumbent)	1,698,711	53.34%	−8.88%
Democratic	Alex Seith	1,448,187	45.47%	+8.13%
Libertarian	Bruce Lee Green	16,320	0.51%	
Socialist Workers	Patricia Grogan	15,922	0.50%	
Socialist Labor	Gerald Rose	5,465	0.18%	
Write-in		159	0.00%	
Majority		250,524	7.87%	−17.00%
Turnout		3,184,764		
Republican hold		Swing		

== See also ==
- 1978 United States Senate elections
