= Donald R. Smith =

American politician

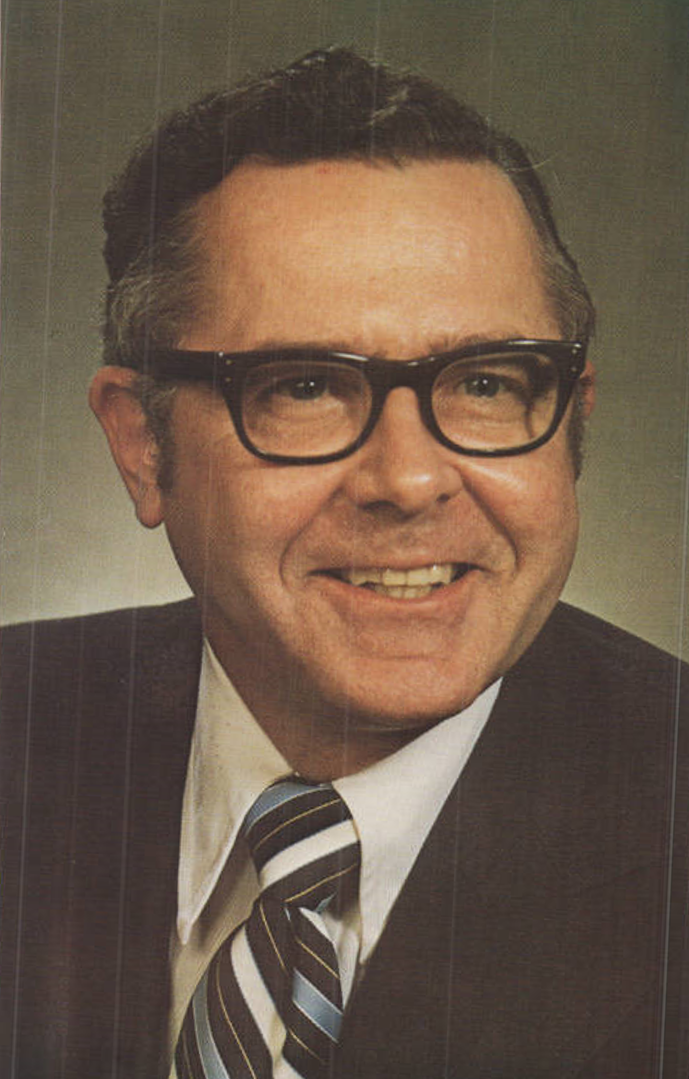

66th Treasurer of Illinois
- In office January 10, 1977 – January 8, 1979
- Governor: Jim Thompson
- Preceded by: Alan J. Dixon
- Succeeded by: Jerome Cosentino

Personal details
- Born: November 13, 1926 Illinois, U.S.
- Died: February 4, 1982 (aged 55) Chicago, Illinois, U.S.
- Party: Republican

Donald R. Smith (November 13, 1926 – February 4, 1982) was an American politician.

Smith graduated from York High School in Elmhurst, Illinois and then joined the United States Navy in 1944 during World War II and served until 1946. He went to Loyola University Chicago and John Marshall Law School In Chicago, Illinois. He served as County Treasurer of DuPage County, Illinois and served on the DuPage County Commission. He was a Republican. From 1965 until 1977, Smith served as chief fiscal officer in the office of the Illinois Treasurer. In 1977, he was appointed Illinois Treasurer when Alan J. Dixon resigned to serve as Illinois Secretary of State. Smith served until 1979.

On February 4, 1982, Smith was found murdered in the Radisson Hotel on North Michigan Avenue. His hands were tied, towel had been stuffed into his mouth, and he had been strangled to death. On February 5, 1982, two suspects held for questioning in the death of Smith were released by the police after passing polygraph tests.
