= 1972 United States Senate election in Illinois =

- November 7, 1972
- Turnout: 51.24%
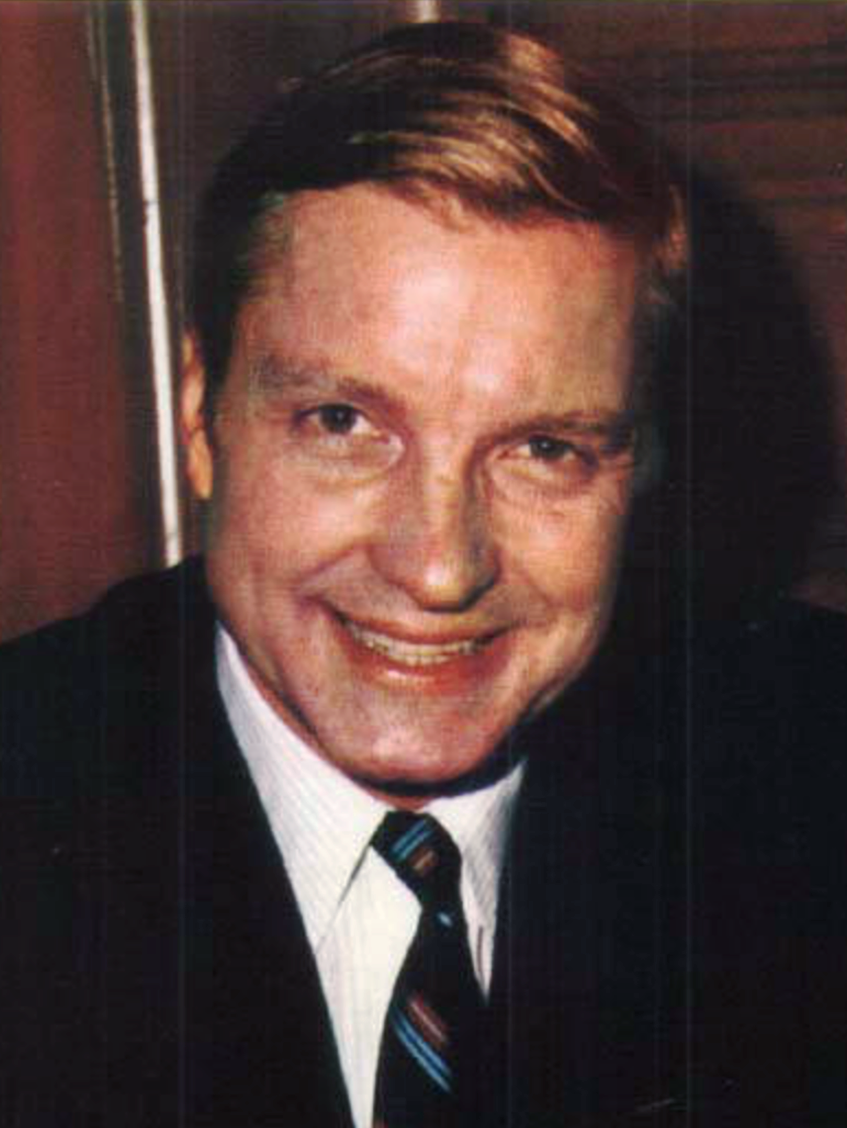

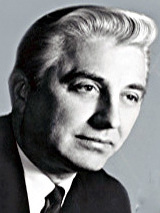
Nominee	Charles Percy	Roman Pucinski
Party	Republican	Democratic
Popular vote	2,867,078	1,721,031
Percentage	62.21%	37.35%
- County results Percy: 50–60% 60–70% 70–80%
U.S. senator before election
Charles H. Percy
Republican
Elected U.S. Senator
Charles H. Percy
Republican

The 1972 United States Senate election in Illinois took place on November 7, 1972. Incumbent Republican United States Senator Charles H. Percy sought re-election to the United States Senate. Percy was opposed by Democratic nominee Roman Pucinski, a United States representative from the Northwest Side of Chicago, whom he was able to defeat handily to win a second term. As of 2022, this was the last time a Republican was elected to the U.S. Senate from Illinois during a presidential election year, the last time an Illinois Republican won a Senate election by double digits, and the last time any candidate has swept every county in the state.

== Background ==
The primary (held on March 21) and general election coincided with those for House and state elections.

Turnout in the primaries was 31.40%, with a total of 1,753,727 votes cast. Turnout during the general election was 51.24%, with 3,184,764 votes cast. Turnout in both the primary and general election was significantly less than those for coinciding statewide races.

== Democratic primary ==
Congressman Roman Pucinski defeated Dakin Williams in the Democratic primary. Williams was a prosecutor who was the younger brother of playwright Tennessee Williams.

=== Candidates ===
- Roman Pucinski, U.S. representative from the Northwest Side of Chicago
- Dakin Williams, prosecutor

=== Results ===
Democratic primary results
Party	Candidate	Votes	%
Democratic	Roman C. Pucinski	859,890	70.62
Democratic	W. Dakin Williams	357,744	29.38
Democratic	Write-ins	71	0
Total votes		1,217,705	100

== Republican primary ==
Incumbent Charles H. Percy was renominated without opposition in the Republican primary.

=== Candidates ===
- Charles H. Percy, incumbent U.S. senator since 1967

=== Results ===
Republican primary results
Party	Candidate	Votes	%
Republican	Charles H. Percy (incumbent)	535,911	99.98
Write-in	Others	111	0.02
Total votes		536,022	100

== General election ==
=== Candidates ===
- Arnold Becchetti (Communist)
- Edward C. Gross, perennial candidate (Socialist Labor)
- Charles H. Percy, incumbent U.S. senator since 1967 (Republican)
- Roman Pucinski, U.S. representative from the Northwest Side of Chicago (Democratic)

United States Senate election in Illinois, 1972
Party	Candidate	Votes	%	±%
Republican	Charles H. Percy (incumbent)	2,867,078	62.21%	+7.27%
Democratic	Roman Pucinski	1,721,031	37.35%	−6.55%
Socialist Labor	Edward C. Gross	13,384	0.29%	
Communist	Arnold Becchetti	6,103	0.13%	
Write-in		784	0.02%	
Majority		1,146,047	24.87%	+13.82%
Turnout		4,608,380		
Republican hold		Swing		

== See also ==
- United States Senate elections, 1972
