= Dave O'Neal =

American politician (1937–2021)

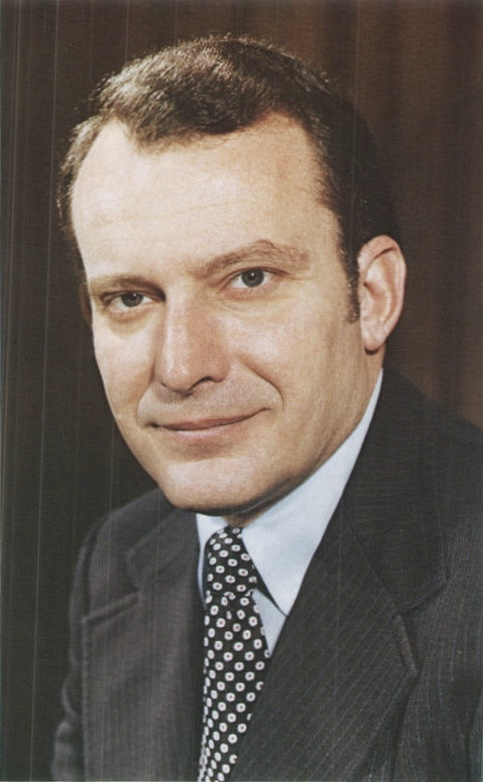
- O'Neal in 1977

41st Lieutenant Governor of Illinois
- In office January 10, 1977 – July 31, 1981
- Governor: Jim Thompson
- Preceded by: Neil Hartigan
- Succeeded by: George Ryan

Sheriff of St. Clair County, Illinois
- In office 1971–1977
- Preceded by: Dan E. Costello
- Succeeded by: Paul Klincar

Personal details
- Born: January 24, 1937 Belleville, Illinois, U.S.
- Died: July 10, 2021 (aged 84) Las Vegas, Nevada, U.S.
- Party: Republican
- Spouse: Sandra
- Profession: Politician, pharmacist and businessman

David Courtland O'Neal (January 24, 1937 – July 10, 2021) was an American law enforcement officer and politician who served as the 41st Lieutenant Governor of Illinois from 1977 to 1981. For six years he served as Saint Clair County Sheriff, the first Republican to hold that office in twenty years.

== Background ==
O’Neal was born January 24, 1937, in Belleville, Illinois. He graduated from St. Louis College of Pharmacy and was a former ministerial student and United States Marine. Prior to entering politics O'Neal was a pharmacist and businessman. He served as a member of the executive and economic development committees of the National Conference of Lieutenant Governors and the governing boards of McKendree University in Lebanon, and the Saint Louis College of Pharmacy. He is the recipient of the Illinois Wisconsin States Association of Elks Humanitarian of the Year and East Saint Louis Model Cities Program Meritorious Services Award and was named Outstanding Young Republican of the United States in 1975 and Outstanding Young Republican of Illinois in 1971.

In 1977, he received the Distinguished Pharmacist Award from the Illinois Pharmacists' Association. An athlete, his hobbies include sports such as tennis, golf, bowling and motorcycling.

== Lt. Governor of Illinois ==
Lieutenant Governor O'Neal devoted much effort to overseeing the Senior Legislative Forum, a legislative advocacy group he created to aid senior citizens throughout Illinois. He also worked closely with the State's two Senior Action Centers, which provides assistance with the elderly and disabled.

His other responsibilities have included chairmanships of the Governor's Special Commission on State-Mandated Programs, the Technical Advisory Committee on Aging, the Illinois Energy Contingency Council's Subcommittee, the Governor's Jail and Detention Standards Review Committee, and a committee to investigate administrative and correctional officer conditions at adult correctional centers.

He has also served as vice-chairman of the Governor's Energy Advisory Council, ex officio member of the Council on Aging, and a member of the Commission on Inter-Governmental Cooperation.

In 1980 O'Neal sought the Republican nomination for the U.S. Senate winning the nomination to go on to the general election. His Democratic opponent was Illinois Secretary of State Alan Dixon. After a tough election battle O'Neal went down to defeat; Dixon defeated O'Neal in a vote of 2,565,302 to 1,946,296. O’Neal resigned as Lieutenant Governor in 1981, claiming that he was just bored.

O'Neal served as Assistant Secretary of the Interior, Division of Energy and Natural Resources in George H.W. Bush administration.

He died on July 10, 2021, in Las Vegas, Nevada, at age 84.

Party political offices
Preceded by Jim Nowlan	Republican nominee for Lieutenant Governor of Illinois; 1976, 1978	Succeeded by George Ryan
Preceded by George Burditt	Republican nominee for U.S. Senator from Illinois (Class 3); 1980	Succeeded by Judy Koehler
Political offices
Preceded by Neil Hartigan	Lieutenant Governor of Illinois; 1977–1981	Succeeded by George H. Ryan
