= Charles H. Percy =

American businessman and U.S. senator (1919–2011)

Chuck Percy
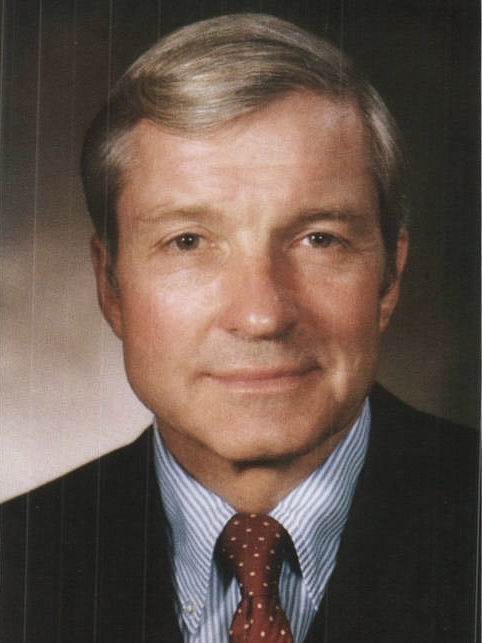
- Official portrait, 1977

United States Senator from Illinois
- In office January 3, 1967 – January 3, 1985
- Preceded by: Paul Douglas
- Succeeded by: Paul Simon

Chair of the Senate Foreign Relations Committee
- In office January 3, 1981 – January 3, 1985
- Preceded by: Frank Church
- Succeeded by: Richard Lugar

Personal details
- Born: Charles Harting Percy; September 27, 1919 Pensacola, Florida, U.S.
- Died: September 17, 2011 (aged 91) Washington, D.C., U.S.
- Resting place: Oak Hill Cemetery; Washington, D.C., U.S.
- Party: Republican
- Spouses: Jeanne Dickerson (m. 1943; died 1947); Loraine Guyer (m. 1950)
- Children: 5, including Sharon
- Education: University of Chicago (BA)

Military service
- Allegiance: United States
- Branch/service: United States Navy
- Years of service: 1943–1945
- Rank: Lieutenant
- Battles/wars: World War II

Charles Harting "Chuck" Percy (September 27, 1919 – September 17, 2011) was an American businessman and politician. He was president of the Bell & Howell Corporation from 1949 to 1964, and served as a Republican U.S. senator from Illinois from 1967 until 1985, following a defeat to Paul Simon. He was mentioned as a Republican presidential hopeful from 1968 through 1988. During his Senate career, Percy concentrated on business and foreign relations.

== Early life and education ==
Charles Harting Percy was born in Pensacola, the seat of Escambia County in far northwestern Florida, the son of Edward H. Percy and the former Elizabeth Harting. His father, an Alabama native descended from illustrious colonial-era Mississippians and Virginians, was at various times an automobile salesman and bank cashier. His Illinois-born mother was a concert violinist. Edward was a son of Charles Brown Percy and Helen Leila Herndon of the powerful Herndon family of Virginia. Elizabeth Harting was a daughter of Phineas Fredrick Harting and Belle Aschenbach.

The family moved to Chicago when Percy was an infant. As a child, he had entrepreneurial energy and held jobs while attending school. In the mid-1930s, his pluck brought him to the attention of his Sunday school teacher, Joseph McNabb, the president of Bell & Howell, then a small camera company.

Percy completed high school at New Trier High School. He entered the University of Chicago on a half tuition scholarship, and worked his way through college with several part-time jobs. He completed his degree in economics in 1941, and was a member of the Alpha Delta Phi fraternity.

== Business career ==
Percy started at Bell & Howell in 1938 as an apprentice and sales trainee while he was still in college. In 1939 he worked at Crowell Collier.

He returned to Bell & Howell in 1941 to work full-time after graduating from the University of Chicago. Astute at business, within a year he was appointed a director of the company. Percy served three years in the United States Navy during World War II and returned to the company in 1945.

In 1949, the Jaycees named Percy one of the "Outstanding Young Men in America", along with Gerald R. Ford Jr., of Michigan, future U.S. president, and John Ben Shepperd, future Texas attorney general.

After Joseph McNabb died in 1949, Percy was made the president of Bell & Howell. He was instrumental in leading the company during a period of financial success and growth. During his leadership, Percy expanded Bell & Howell, raising revenues 32-fold and the number of employees 12-fold, and listing the company on the New York Stock Exchange. While continuing to manufacture movie cameras and movie and sound projectors for military, commercial, and home use, in the late 1940s the company diversified into the production of microfilm. It later entered the rapidly expanding markets of information services as well.

== Political career ==
In the late 1950s, Percy decided to enter politics. With the encouragement of then U.S. President Dwight D. Eisenhower, Percy helped to write Decisions for a Better America, which proposed a set of long-range goals for the Republican Party. He belonged to the moderate and liberal wing of the Republican party, led by Eisenhower during his presidency and later closely identified with New York Governor Nelson A. Rockefeller. In 1958, Percy served on the Rockefeller Foundation's Special Study Fund, essentially working as an informal advisor to Rockefeller's campaign for Governor of New York.

Percy first entered electoral politics with a run for governor of Illinois in 1964, which he narrowly lost to Democratic incumbent Otto Kerner. During his gubernatorial campaign, Percy reluctantly endorsed conservative Republican presidential nominee Barry Goldwater, his future Senate colleague. Goldwater fared poorly throughout the country, although he did marginally better in Illinois than in the nation at large.

=== Murder of Valerie Percy ===
In 1966, when Percy ran for U.S. senator from Illinois against Democratic incumbent Paul Douglas (a former professor of Percy's at the University of Chicago), his 21-year-old daughter Valerie was murdered at the family home on the morning of September 18, late in the campaign. Her death was thought to have been caused by an intruder. Illinois state police interviewed more than 14,000 people, spent over $300,000, and pursued 1,317 leads. Lead No. 273 led police to Francis Leroy Hohimer and Frederick Malchow, whom law enforcement believed committed the murder while robbing the house. The men belonged to a gang of Mafia-backed thieves that robbed wealthy homes. Chicago detectives are certain of at least 30 jobs the gang pulled, with an excess of $3,000,000 in jewels and cash taken. Testimony from several key people after Valerie's murder stated Hohimer confessed to them that he killed Valerie because she awoke during the home burglary. Nevertheless, no physical evidence was ever found to connect either of them to scene, and nothing was stolen from the home that night. The crime was never solved despite a lengthy investigation.

After Valerie's death, Percy and Douglas both suspended campaigning for two weeks. In the general election, Percy upset Douglas with 56 percent of the vote.

After Percy appeared on the television show Face The Nation on January 15, 1967, with the other newly elected Republican senators, President Lyndon Johnson noted privately that he thought Percy would make a fine president if the opportunity should ever arise.

On December 12, 1967, Senator Percy met with South Vietnamese President Thieu and assured him that "no responsible people in either the Democratic or the Republican Party favored US withdrawal from South Vietnam."

In 1967, Senator Percy introduced a bill to establish a program to stimulate production of low-cost housing. Percy's proposal was the first of its kind to provide home ownership to low-income families, and it received strong support from Republicans in both the House and the Senate, although it ultimately did not pass. When asked why he selected housing for his first major legislative proposal, Percy said: "Of all the problems I ran across during three years of campaigning, first for the governorship and then for the Senate, the most appalling in their consequences for the future seemed to be the problems of the declining areas of the city and countryside, the inadequacy of housing." Percy voted in favor of the Civil Rights Act of 1968 and the confirmation of Thurgood Marshall to the U.S. Supreme Court, joined other Rockefeller Republicans in voting against the Supreme Court nominations of Clement Haynsworth and George Harrold Carswell, but did vote for William Rehnquist in 1971.

When in the Senate less than two years, Percy was mentioned as a Republican hopeful for the 1968 presidential nomination. The New York Times columnist James B. Reston referred to him as "the hottest political article in the Republican Party". In 1970, Percy spoke about his enjoyment of The Autobiography of Malcolm X, saying "Every white person should read it."

=== U.S. Senate ===
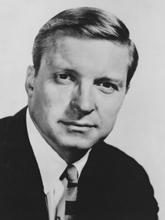
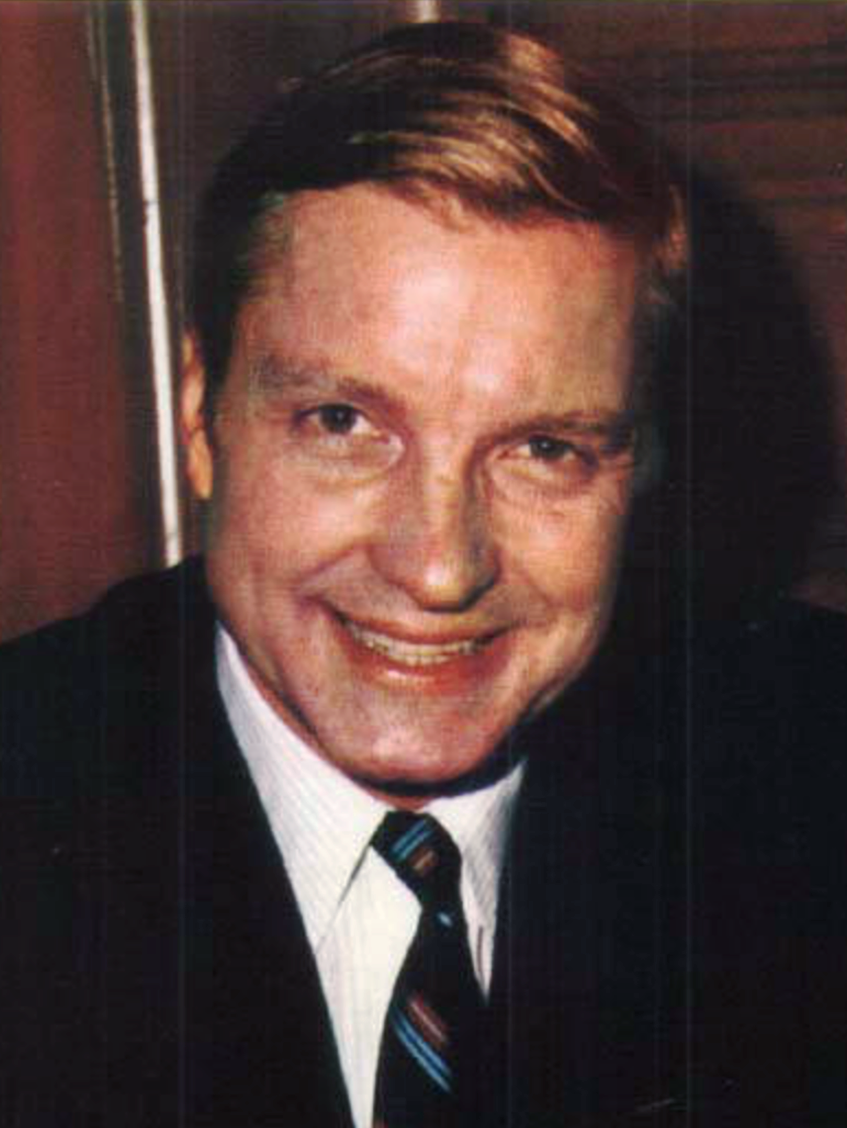
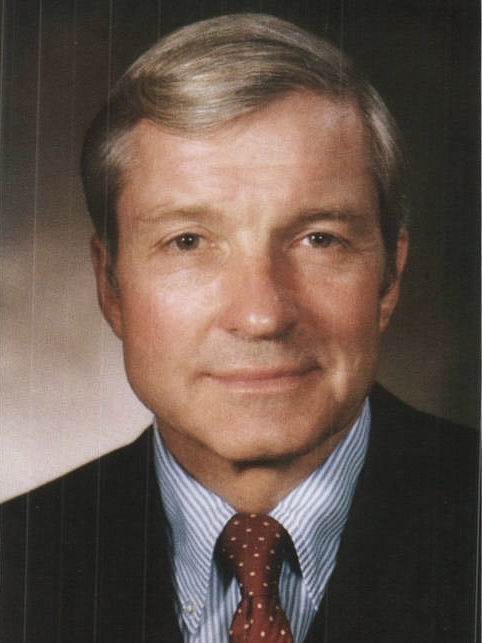
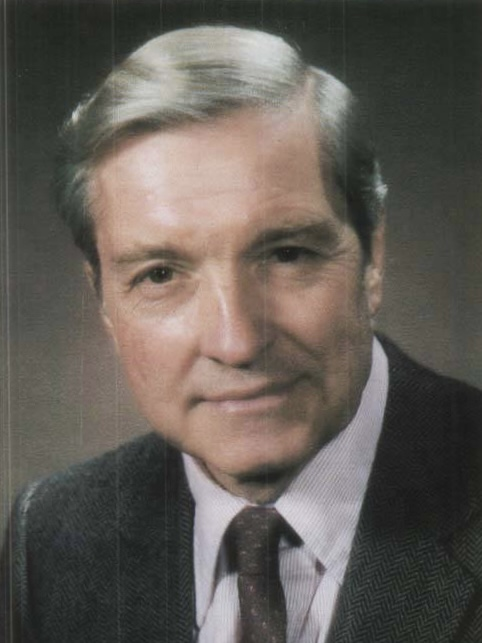
Percy in the Illinois Blue Book over the years

In 1972, Percy sought a second term to the Senate. In the general election, he defeated Congressman Roman Pucinski by a landslide. He gave up his seat on the important Senate Appropriations Committee for one on the Foreign Relations Committee.

In 1974, Percy introduced legislation making the 55 miles per hour (89 km/h) national maximum speed limit permanent, which became law in January 1975, remaining in effect until it was amended in 1987 to allow 65 miles per hour (105 km/h) on rural Interstate highways and finally repealed in 1995.

In 1978, as Percy was completing his second term, he appeared invincible. Percy was considered so strong that the Democratic Party was unable to persuade any serious candidates to challenge him in that year's election. Alex Seith, a dark horse candidate, was his Democratic challenger. Seith had never before sought elected office but had served as an appointee on the Cook County Zoning Board of Appeals for twelve years, nine as chairman.

At that time, Percy's reputation as a moderate Rockefeller Republican, contrasted with Seith's ostensible hard-line foreign policy positions, combined to make Percy suddenly vulnerable in the weeks before the election. Percy had earlier worked to broaden the base of the Republican Party and was an outlier to more conservative elements. Sensing his probable loss, Percy went on television days before the polling and, with tear-filled eyes, pleaded with Illinois voters to give him another chance. He said, "I got your message and you're right ... I'm sure that I've made my share of mistakes, but your priorities are mine." He won re-election 53% to Seith's 46%.

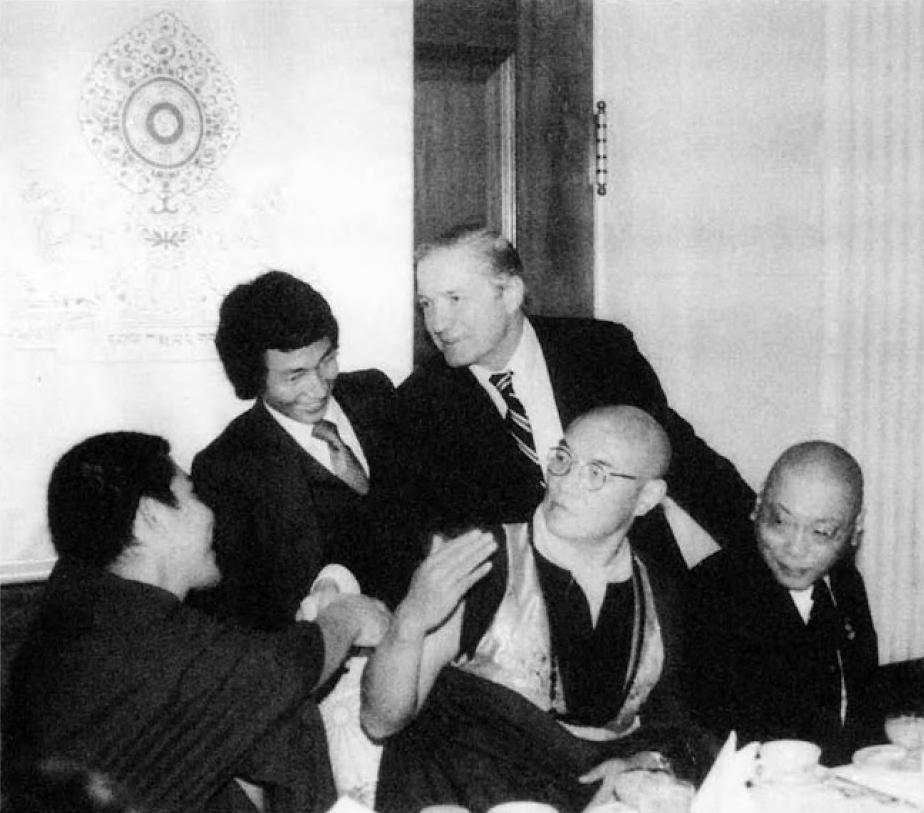
1980 luncheon in honor of the 16th Karmapa (Rangjung Rigpe Dorje) at the U S Capitol. Tibetan Buddhists (seated left to right) Jamgon Kongtrul Rinpoche, 16th Karmapa, Chogyam Trungpa. Standing is Ngodup Burkhar, a translator and Senator Charles Percy, Chairman of the Foreign Relations Committee

After the Republicans won control of the Senate in 1980, Percy became chairman of the Foreign Relations Committee. That year he gave a luncheon in honor of the 16th Karmapa of Tibet at the United States Capitol with other Tibetan Buddhists and congressmen. He served in the Senate until the end of his third term in January 1985, after narrowly losing to Congressman Paul Simon in 1984. Critics had accused Percy of paying more attention to foreign affairs than to the domestic issues of his constituents. After Percy's defeat, no Republican would win a senatorial race in Illinois until Peter Fitzgerald in 1998, and no Republican would ever win Percy's old seat again.

In 2006, writing about the influence of political lobbies on the U.S. relationship with Israel, political theorists John Mearsheimer and Stephen Walt wrote that they believed Percy's loss was the result of a campaign waged against him by the American Israel Public Affairs Committee (AIPAC). They note that despite a generally pro-Israel voting record, Percy incurred AIPAC's wrath by declining to sign the AIPAC-sponsored "Letter of 76" protesting President Ford's threatened "reassessment" of U.S. Middle East policy in 1975. Percy also called PLO leader Yasser Arafat more "moderate" than some other Palestinians. Earlier that year, Percy and the chairman of the House Foreign Affairs Committee, Dante Fascell argued that Karl Linnas, a former concentration camp commander who was to be deported from Pennsylvania to Estonia who lied in the papers he used to enter the United States, should not be sent to the Soviet Union. Linnas was found to have ordered, and participated in, the murders of Jews and other prisoners. Percy's view, shared by Fascell, Representative Donald L. Ritter of Pennsylvania, and the Helsinki Commission, was that Linnas should be deported, just not to the Soviet Union as it "would be an acknowledgement that the USSR has formally taken over Estonia."

While in the Senate, Percy was active in business and international affairs. Although he explored the possibility of running for president in both 1968 and 1976, he did not run either time. During the early 1970s, he clashed with President Nixon and criticized the U.S. conduct of the Vietnam War.

In 1977, Percy and Senator Hubert H. Humphrey—responding to the 1973 OPEC oil embargo and high energy prices in general—created the Alliance to Save Energy to encourage a national commitment to energy efficiency. Percy was the founding chairman of the organization.

Percy was mentioned again for the presidency in 1980 and 1988, but his candidacies did not progress beyond the exploratory stage. In 1981, three congressional staffers of Percy's Subcommittee on Energy, Nuclear Proliferation, and Government Processes (Bill Strauss, Elaina Newport, and Jim Aidala) formed the political-satire group the Capitol Steps, which performed for 40 years.

Perhaps Percy's most important act, and his longest-lasting legacy, was ending the practice of nominating federal judges from a pool of candidates generated by the Chicago political machine. He implemented a system of consultation with, and advice from, groups of legal experts, including the professional bar association, a practice considered novel at the time. One of his nominees, John Paul Stevens, was selected by President Gerald Ford as a justice of the U.S. Supreme Court.

== Marriage and family ==
Percy was a Christian Scientist. During World War II, he married Jeanne Valerie Dickerson. They had twin daughters, Valerie and Sharon (born 1944) and a son Roger (born 1946). After Jeanne Percy's death in 1947, Percy married Loraine Diane Guyer in 1950. They had two children: Gail (born 1953) and Mark (born 1955).

One of his twin daughters, Valerie Percy, was murdered at age 21 in her bedroom in the family home in Kenilworth, Illinois, near Chicago, during his senatorial campaign in September 1966. She had been beaten and stabbed to death in her bed while the family was in residence. Although Valerie's stepmother allegedly briefly glimpsed the killer, and considerable resources were devoted to solving the crime, the identity of the murderer remains unknown. The wife of a first responder physician to the scene stated in 2016 that her late husband, Dr. Robert Hohf, felt that "the crime scene had been cleaned up" by the time he arrived to the Percy home early on the morning of September 18, 1966.

In 1967 her twin sister Sharon Percy married John D. Rockefeller IV. He became a politician and was later elected Democratic governor of West Virginia (1977–1985). He served as a United States senator for West Virginia from 1985 until 2015.

Percy remained active after leaving political office but suffered from Alzheimer's disease in later years. He died on September 17, 2011, at the Washington Home and Community Hospice in Washington, D.C. He was interred at Oak Hill Cemetery in Washington, D.C.

== Awards ==
- 1949 one of 10 outstanding young men of United States Junior Chamber of Commerce
- 1955 World Trade award World Trade Award Commission
- 1956 National Sales Executives Management award
- 1962 Business Man of Year award Saturday Review
- 1962 Statesmanship award Harvard Business School Association of Chicago
- 1962 Humanitarian Service award Abraham Lincoln Center
- 1986 Humanitarian of the Year award Save the Children Fund
- 1965 Top-Hat award National Federation of Business and Professional Women's Clubs
- 1965 Business Administration award Drexel Institute
- 1982 UNICEF World of Children award
- Lifetime Achievement Award Alliance to Save Energy
- Commander French Legion of Honor

Party political offices
Preceded by William Stratton	Republican nominee for Governor of Illinois; 1964	Succeeded by Richard B. Ogilvie
Preceded by Samuel W. Witwer	Republican nominee for U.S. Senator from Illinois (Class 2); 1966, 1972, 1978, 1984	Succeeded by Lynn Morley Martin
Preceded by Everett Dirksen; Gerald Ford	Response to the State of the Union address 1968; Served alongside: Howard Baker, George H. W. Bush, Peter Dominick, Gerald Ford, Robert Griffin, Thomas Kuchel, Mel Laird, Bob Mathias, George Murphy, Dick Poff, Al Quie, Charlotte Reid, Hugh Scott, Bill Steiger, John Tower	Vacant Title next held by Donald Fraser, Scoop Jackson, Mike Mansfield, John McCormack, Patsy Mink, Ed Muskie, Bill Proxmire
U.S. Senate
Preceded by Paul Douglas	U.S. Senator (Class 2) from Illinois; 1967–1985; Served alongside: Everett Dirksen, Ralph Tyler Smith, Adlai Stevenson III, Alan J. Dixon	Succeeded by Paul Simon
Preceded by Karl Mundt	Ranking Member of the Senate Governmental Affairs Committee; 1973–1981	Succeeded by Thomas Eagleton
Preceded by Frank Church	Chair of the Senate Foreign Relations Committee; 1981–1985	Succeeded by Richard Lugar
