= Political positions of Joe Lieberman =

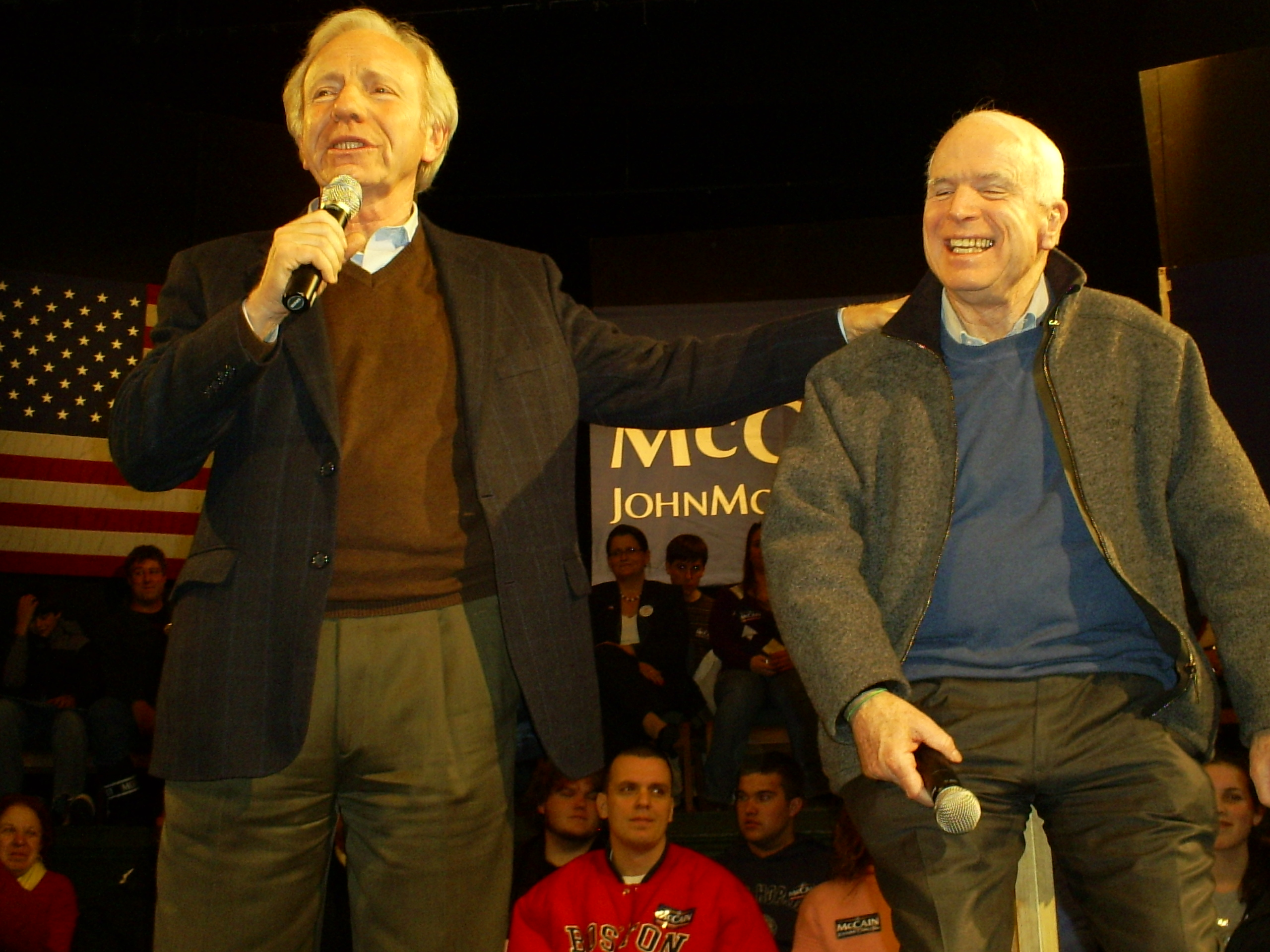
Joe Lieberman, campaigning for Republican Senator from Arizona John McCain, during the 2008 United States presidential election

Joe Lieberman (February 24, 1942 – March 27, 2024) was an American politician who served as a United States Senator from Connecticut from 1989 to 2013. A former member of the Democratic Party, he was the party's nominee for Vice President in the 2000 election. He was an independent prior to his death.

== Party identification ==
In spring 2000, Lieberman among other centrist Democrats founded the Senate New Democrat Coalition. In January 2007, Lieberman described himself as being "genuinely an Independent," saying "I agree more often than not with Democrats on domestic policy. I agree more often than not with Republicans on foreign and defense policy."

== Domestic policy ==
=== Abortion ===
Overall Lieberman had a pro-choice voting record, and in 2007 he received a grade of 100 from the abortion rights organization NARAL Pro-Choice America. While running in the Democratic primaries in the 2004 presidential election, Lieberman said that as president he would "follow a policy that makes abortion safe, rare and legal." He voted against the Partial-Birth Abortion Ban Act.

=== Affirmative action ===
In a 1995 speech before the National Press Club, Lieberman said, "this business of deciding by group, the argument that some make that some groups are genetically less able than others. That's an un-American argument." Affirmative action programs "must change because they are inconsistent with the law and basic American values of equal treatment and opportunity." He also stated that he was "against group preferences, but there ought to be some room for the kind of outreach that has been part of affirmative action programs without getting into quotas.

In 1996, he expressed support for California's Proposition 209, which sought to eliminate state and local government affirmative action programs in the areas of public employment, public education, and public contracting to the extent these programs involve "preferential treatment based on race, sex, gender, color, ethnicity, or national origin." "Affirmative action is dividing us in ways its creators could never have intended.", he said.

Since 2000, he rescinded his support for the proposition, saying that he expressed support "without understand[ing] the intent of Proposition 209", and renounced any support for Proposition 209. In the 2000 campaign, Lieberman assured the black voters, "I have supported affirmative action, I do support affirmative action, and I will support affirmative action because history and current reality make it necessary."

In 2003, Lieberman criticized Bush's affirmative action policy. In 2004, he reiterated his support, "I support affirmative action programs, including in appropriate instances consideration of race and gender in government contracting decisions, when the affirmative action program is designed to remedy the effects of past discrimination."

During his 2004 campaign, Lieberman stated that he wanted to increase subsidies for women-owned non-profit business, and he voted yes on setting aside 10% of highway funds for companies owned by minorities and women without regard to the demographics of their employees.

=== Consumer protection ===
Lieberman was one of four Senate Democrats to side with Republicans in 1995 in voting to limit punitive damage awards in product liability cases.

In February 2005, breaking ranks with fellow Senate Democrats, Lieberman voted for the Class Action Fairness Act of 2005, S. 5, which is a bill to curtail the ability of plaintiffs to file class action lawsuits against corporations in federal courts. The bill was backed by the White House and business groups as an essential tort reform measure that would reduce what they said was a debilitating number of frivolous lawsuits. The bill was opposed by consumer advocacy groups and trial lawyers who argued that many valid claims against corporations would be dismissed, leaving consumers without legal recourse.

=== Crime ===
Lieberman had long been a strong supporter of the death penalty. He ran for the Senate in 1988 as "[a]n unapologetic proponent of capital punishment." During his 2000 run for Vice President, Nat Hentoff of the Village Voice referred to him as a "relentless advocate of capital punishment." In 2002, Peter Beinart of The New Republic listed Lieberman among several potential Democratic presidential candidates who supported the death penalty.

=== Enemy Expatriation Act ===
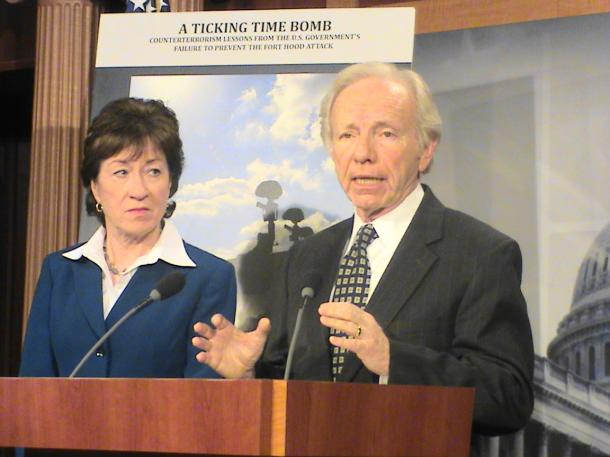
Senate Homeland Security and Governmental Affairs Committee Chairman Lieberman and Ranking Member Susan Collins address bipartisan suggestion on countermeasures toward Islamist extremism & domestic terrorism in U.S.

In January 2012, Lieberman co-sponsored the Enemy Expatriation Act (HR 3166 and S. 1698) a proposed law in the United States also sponsored by Senator Scott Brown (R-MA) and Representatives Charlie Dent (R-PA) and Jason Altmire (D-PA). The bill would allow the United States government to strip US citizens of their citizenship if they participate in terrorism, defined as "providing material support or resources to a Foreign Terrorist Organization, as designated by the secretary of state, or actively engaging in hostilities against the United States or its allies". In early 2012, the proposal was compared to the recently passed National Defense Authorization Act, and some writers have suggested that the two laws could be used together to take away citizens' civil liberties. If passed, the bill would add to the circumstances under which US citizenship can be lost.

=== Education ===
Lieberman championed experimental voucher programs, which would redirect some education funding directly to parents, who could apply it towards paying for the public or private school of their choice.

Lieberman had called Bush's No Child Left Behind Act plan a "progressive piece of legislation" which has been insufficiently funded. He said, "A month after he signed the law, President Bush under funded it by $6 billion less than was promised in the legislation. This is creating greater pressures on our schools to perform and educate our kids—which is appropriate—but without giving them sufficient resources to make it happen." He had repeatedly criticized the administration to this effect.

With Lynne Cheney, Richard Lamm, Saul Bellow, and others, Lieberman co-founded the American Council of Trustees and Alumni (ACTA), a controversial educational organization which released the post-9/11 report titled "Defending Civilization: How Our Universities Are Failing America and What Can Be Done About It" that criticized universities for evidence of anti-Americanism.

=== Entertainment ===
Lieberman was critical of the entertainment media. On November 29, 2005, Lieberman co-sponsored the Family Entertainment Protection Act, which was introduced by Hillary Clinton, S.2126. The act is intended to protect children from what he says is inappropriate content found in video games. He has denounced the violence contained in video games and has attempted to regulate sales of violent video games to minors, arguing that games should have to be labeled based upon age-appropriateness. Regarding Grand Theft Auto, he said "The player is rewarded for attacking a woman, pushing her to the ground, kicking her repeatedly and then ultimately killing her, shooting her over and over again. I call on the entertainment companies—they've got a right to do that, but they have a responsibility not to do it if we want to raise the next generation of our sons to treat women with respect". He voted for the Communications Decency Act.

=== Environment ===
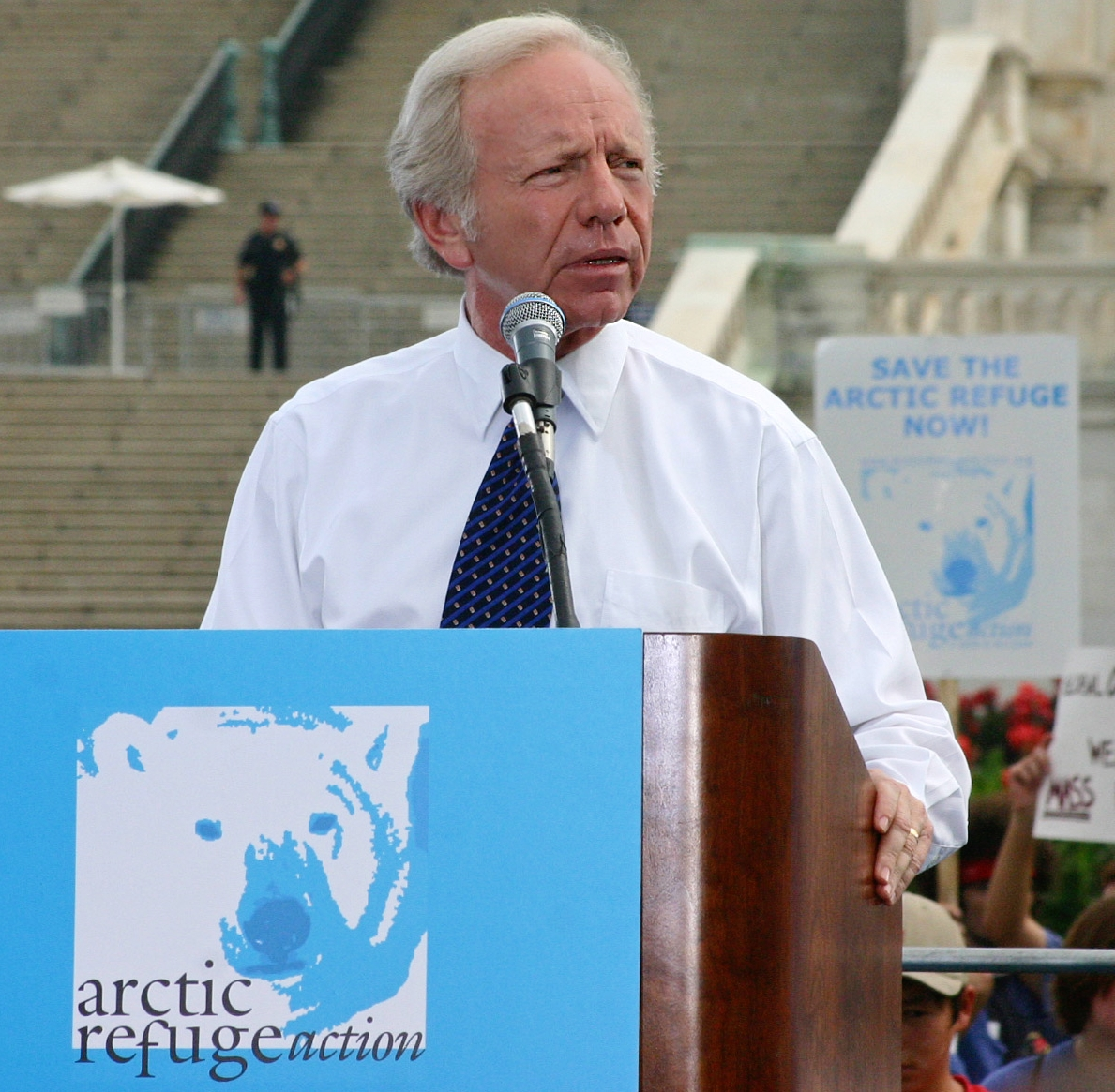
Senator Lieberman speaks at a 2005 event to keep Alaska wild to save polar bears among other arctic wildlifes

Lieberman co-sponsored the Clean Air Act (1990), introduced legislation in 1991 to give consumers more information about the dangers of pesticides, and has addressed the need to limit global warming.

Lieberman had stated that the US population has to accept responsibility for global warming, and voted "yes" on banning drilling in the Arctic National Wildlife Refuge. Lieberman voted yes on reducing oil usage by 40% by 2025 (instead of 5%). Lieberman voted against Gale Norton as Secretary of Interior, and voted for funding for greater risk assessment by the Environmental Protection Agency (EPA). Lieberman has even gone as far as saying he wants to raise mileage standard to 40 mpg. Lieberman voted for the administration-backed Energy Policy Act of 2005; facing criticism, Lieberman called the bill imperfect but good for Connecticut, citing a saving of $800 million for Connecticut electricity customers. Lieberman has been a vocal critic of Bush's environmental policy.

==== Lieberman–Warner Climate Security Act of 2008 ====
Also more commonly referred to as the cap and trade bill, proposed to ration (cap) carbon emissions in the U.S., and tax or purchase (trade) carbon credits on the global market for greater U.S. alignment with the Kyoto Protocol standards and goals. The bill (as reported in the Senate) was 550 pages long, and provided for establishment of a federal bureau of Carbon Trading, Regulation, and Enforcement.

=== Financial accounting standards, flag desecration, and right to die ===
Lieberman toyed with the idea of switching his affiliation to Republican, especially if Senate Democrats went what he saw as too far in ending the War in Iraq. In the 110th Congress, such a switch would have left the Senate equally divided, with Vice President Dick Cheney holding the tie-breaking vote.

He helped defeat the Financial Accounting Standards Board (FASB) proposal of requiring the reporting of the costs of stock options as a business expense during the mid-nineties. During an interview with PBS after the Enron scandal, Lieberman defended his position, saying, "it was a good action." Facing the growing stock option scandals, Lieberman acknowledged that "clearly a disproportionate percent of the options went to a small percentage of executives. That was disappointing."

Lieberman had voted against amending the Constitution to make it constitutional to criminalize flag desecration.

In 2005, Lieberman said it was justified to give Terri Schiavo "the opportunity for one more chance before her life was terminated by an act which was sanctioned by a court, by the state ... [Judge George Greer, who ordered Schiavo's feeding tube removed] made a best guess based on the evidence before him. That's not enough when you're talking about aggressively removing food and water to end someone's life." He said he would have kept Schiavo's feeding tube in.

=== Gang of 14 ===
On May 23, 2005, Lieberman was one of fourteen senators, dubbed the Gang of 14, who forged a compromise on the Democrats' use of the judicial filibuster, thus avoiding the Republican leadership's implementation of the so-called nuclear option. Under the agreement, the Democrats would exercise the power to filibuster a Bush judicial nominee only in an extraordinary circumstance, and three of the filibustered Bush appellate court nominees – (Janice Rogers Brown, Priscilla Owen and William Pryor) – would receive a vote by the full Senate, which resulted in their confirmation. Lieberman refused to support a filibuster against Supreme Court Justice nominee Samuel Alito. Alito was confirmed by the United States Senate on January 31, 2006, by a vote of 58–42, becoming the Court's 110th Justice. Lieberman voted against the Alito confirmation in the final Senate vote. On the John Roberts nomination as the Chief Justice of the United States, Lieberman believed that Roberts did not seem to be the kind of right-wing candidate the Gang of 14 feared the president would select. Lieberman said he thought Roberts was a decent guy. But he also said it was too early to draw further conclusions. Roberts was confirmed by the United States Senate on September 29, 2005, by a vote of 78–22, becoming the Court's 17th Chief Justice. Lieberman voted for the Roberts confirmation.

=== Gun laws ===
Lieberman received an "F" rating from the NRA Political Victory Fund and a 90% from the Coalition to Stop Gun Violence. He has sought to ban guns in schools and places of worship. He had voted against prohibiting most lawsuits against gun manufacturers, but cast another vote that would immunize gun manufacturers from lawsuits over gun violence. He had voted to require background checks at gun shows and against allowing guns to be sold without trigger locks.

In 2000, he opposed Al Gore's position to require a gun license to purchase a new handgun. Although they disagreed on this issue, Gore asked Lieberman not to change his position.

=== Health care ===
Lieberman voted in favor of the Early Treatment for HIV Act of 2003, which provided Medicaid treatment for people with HIV. He also voted for prohibiting HIV-positive immigrants from entering the United States.

Lieberman was critical of Bush's Medicare plan, arguing that, in its current state, it does not provide sufficiently for the elderly.

In March 2006, according to The New Haven Register, when asked about the approach of Catholic hospitals on contraceptives for rape victims, Lieberman said he believed that Catholic hospitals that refuse to give contraceptives to rape victims for "principled reasons" shouldn't be forced to do so. "In Connecticut, it shouldn't take more than a short ride to get to another hospital," he said.

During his 2004 campaign, Lieberman said, "The day I walk into the Oval Office, the first thing I'm going to do is rescind the Bush administration restrictions on embryonic stem cell research." In 2006, he criticized Bush's veto of the Stem Cell Research Enhancement Act of 2005.

In 2005, Lieberman, along with Republicans Orrin Hatch and Sam Brownback, introduced S. 975, the Project BioShield II Act of 2005. Its stated purpose was to provide incentives to increase research by private sector entities to develop medical countermeasures to counter bioterrorism threats. The bill would have provided tax credits, patent extensions, and immunity from civil liability.

During a 2006 debate with challenger Ned Lamont, Lieberman claimed to be working towards universal health care.

Lieberman joined a few other Democrats, Republican Florida Governor Jeb Bush and the Republican Congress as a vocal opponent of efforts to remove the feeding tube in the Terri Schiavo case.

Lieberman was a co-sponsor of the Healthy Americans Act.

In 2009, Lieberman opposed to a "public option" and stated he would side with Republicans and filibuster any attempt to pass major health legislation that includes one. Lieberman confirmed on December 13, 2009, he will not vote for the Senate Health care bill in its current form, reportedly informing Majority Leader Harry Reid directly that he would filibuster any attempt to pass health care with a public option or an expansion of Medicare coverage. Lieberman, however, supported the expansion of Medicare as a part of the 2000 Democratic presidential platform and as recently as September 2009. Writing about Lieberman in 2009, Nate Silver of FiveThirtyEight said he was "generally not one of the more sold-out Senators," ranking him 75th out of 100 senators for percentage of contributions from corporate PACs, although he received nearly $1 million in campaign contributions from the health sector from 2005 to 2010. Reid later remarked to Senate colleagues, "They don't call him Joe Gun for nothing."

=== Internet censorship ===
In 2008, Lieberman's Senate committee issued a report titled "Violent Islamist Extremism, the Internet, and the Homegrown Terrorist Threat," which "identified the Internet as 'one of the primary drivers' of the terrorist threat to the United States." In conjunction with this report, Lieberman "demanded that YouTube take down hundreds of videos produced by Islamist terrorist organizations or their supporters. YouTube reviewed the videos to determine whether they violated its guidelines, which prohibit hate speech and graphic or gratuitous violence. It took down 80 videos, but left others up. Mr. Lieberman said that was 'not enough,' and demanded that more come down." The New York Times reported that Lieberman was "trying to pressure YouTube to pull down videos he does not like" and wrote that "[w]hile it is fortunate that Mr. Lieberman does not have the power to tell YouTube that it must remove videos, it is profoundly disturbing that an influential senator would even consider telling a media company to shut down constitutionally protected speech."

On June 19, 2010, Lieberman introduced a bill called "Protecting Cyberspace as a National Asset Act of 2010", which he co-wrote with Senator Susan Collins (R-ME) and Senator Thomas Carper (D-DE). If signed into law, this controversial bill, which the American media dubbed the "Kill switch bill", would grant the President emergency powers over the Internet. However, all three co-authors of the bill issued a statement claiming that instead, the bill "[narrowed] existing broad Presidential authority to take over telecommunications networks". American computer security specialist and author Bruce Schneier objected to the "kill switch" proposal on the basis that it rests on several faulty assumptions and that it's "too coarse a hammer". Schneier wrote:

Defending his proposal, Sen. Lieberman pointed out that China has this capability. It's debatable whether or not it actually does, but it's actively pursuing the capability because the country cares less about its citizens. Here in the U.S., it is both wrong and dangerous to give the president the power and ability to commit Internet suicide and terrorize Americans in this way.

Sen. Lieberman was a major opponent of the whistle-blowing website WikiLeaks. His staff "made inquiries" of Amazon.com and other internet companies such as PayPal, Visa, and MasterCard which resulted in them suspending service to WikiLeaks. Blogger Glenn Greenwald called Lieberman's actions "one of the most pernicious acts by a U.S. Senator in quite some time," and accused Lieberman of "emulat[ing] Chinese dictators" by "abusing his position as Homeland Security Chairman to thuggishly dictate to private companies which websites they should and should not host--and, more important, what you can and cannot read on the Internet." Lieberman has also suggested that "The New York Times and other news organisations publishing the US embassy cables being released by WikiLeaks could be investigated for breaking US espionage laws."

Along with Senators John Ensign and Scott Brown, Lieberman "introduced a bill to amend the Espionage Act in order to facilitate the prosecution of folks like WikiLeaks." Critics have noted that "[l]eaking [classified] information in the first place is already a crime, so the measure is aimed squarely at publishers," and that "Lieberman's proposed solution to WikiLeaks could have implications for journalists reporting on some of the more unsavory practices of the intelligence community." Legal analyst Benjamin Wittes has called the proposed legislation "the worst of both worlds," saying:

"It leaves intact the current World War I-era Espionage Act provision, 18 U.S.C. 793(e), a law [with] many problems ... and then takes a currently well-drawn law and expands its scope to the point that it covers a lot more than the most reckless of media excesses. A lot of good journalism would be a crime under this provision; after all, knowingly and willfully publishing material 'concerning the human intelligence activities of the United States or any foreign government' is no small part of what a good newspaper does."

As a result of these statements and actions, Lieberman has been perceived as an opponent of Internet Free Speech and become the target of Anonymous attacks under Operation Payback.

=== Labor ===
Lieberman was a co-sponsor of the Employee Free Choice Act. Lieberman had a 100% AFL–CIO rating in 2003, indicating a pro-union voting record.

Lieberman was a supporter of the H1-B Visa Program, which allows employers to import "skilled" workers for employment in the US. In 2007, Lieberman and Senator Chuck Hagel (R-NE) proposed raising the yearly cap for such visas from 65,000 to 115,000, with provisions to allow future yearly quotas as high as 180,000.

=== LGBT rights ===
In 2004, Lieberman scored a rating of 88 out of 100 by the Human Rights Campaign."

Lieberman voted no on a constitutional ban of same-sex marriage. In 2003, in response to the Massachusetts ruling that sanctions gay marriage, Lieberman stated "although I am opposed to gay marriage, I have also long believed that states have the right to adopt for themselves laws that allow same-sex unions", and "I will oppose any attempts by the right wing to change the Constitution in response to today's Massachusetts Supreme Court ruling, which would be unnecessary and divisive".

Lieberman cosponsored the Domestic Partners Benefits and Obligations act of 2009, which will provide the same benefits to same-sex domestic partners of federal employees as spouses currently have. In 1996, Lieberman cosponsored the Employment Non-Discrimination Act (ENDA), which would prohibit employment discrimination on the basis of sexual orientation. Lieberman has adopted a non-discriminatory policy in employment decisions, which include sexual orientation and gender. However, he supported the Defense of Marriage Act in 1996 and Don't ask, don't tell in 1993. In 2010, he voted to repeal Don't ask, don't tell. In August 1994, Jesse Helms (R-NC) and Bob Smith (R-NH) proposed an amendment, S.AMDT.2434, to Elementary and Secondary Education Reauthorization (ESEA) – S.1513 – that would prevent federal funding for schools that "implement or carry out a program or activity that has either the purpose or effect of encouraging or supporting homosexuality as a positive lifestyle". Lieberman voted for the amendment. He voted against a measure to grant domestic partner benefits to District of Columbia employees.

=== Social Security ===
Lieberman cosponsored a resolution urging the Congress to reject the Bush Administration Social Security Commission's report.

Regarding the debate over privatizing Social Security, Lieberman said, "this is an ongoing problem, and we'd be wise to deal with it." He told The Hartford Courant in January 2005 when asked about Social Security, "if we can figure out a way to help people through private accounts or something else, great." Although Lieberman praised Lindsey Graham (R-SC) for trying to fashion a bipartisan social security plan, he ultimately voted against the Bush Social Security plan.

== Foreign policy ==
=== Military intervention ===
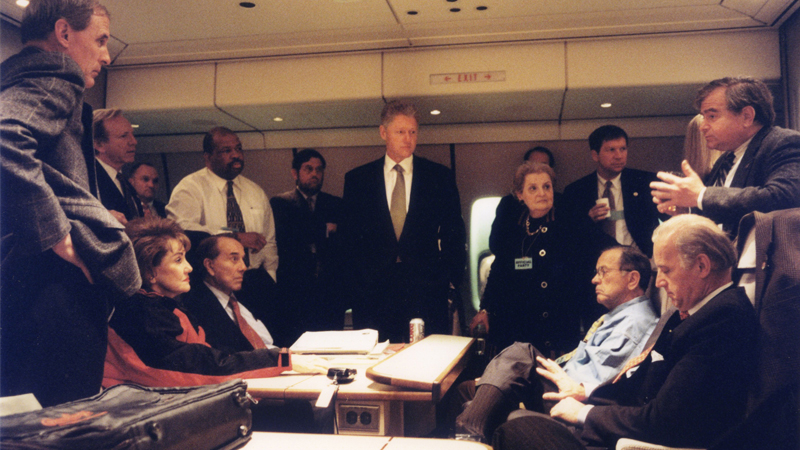
Lieberman (second from the left) and Senate colleagues with President Bill Clinton and his national security team on Air Force One to Bosnia in 1997

According to a 2003 article in The Boston Globe, Lieberman "initially supported the Vietnam War, then changed his mind in late 1967, when he decided it was 'the wrong place to be.' He has firmly backed every military action since then: Grenada, Libya, Panama, Kosovo, Afghanistan, and both Gulf wars." Since that time, he had repeatedly urged new American attacks against Iran, Syria and, most recently, action in Yemen against terrorists.

=== Atlanticism ===
Lieberman was an advisor to the Atlantic Bridge.

=== Committee on the Present Danger ===
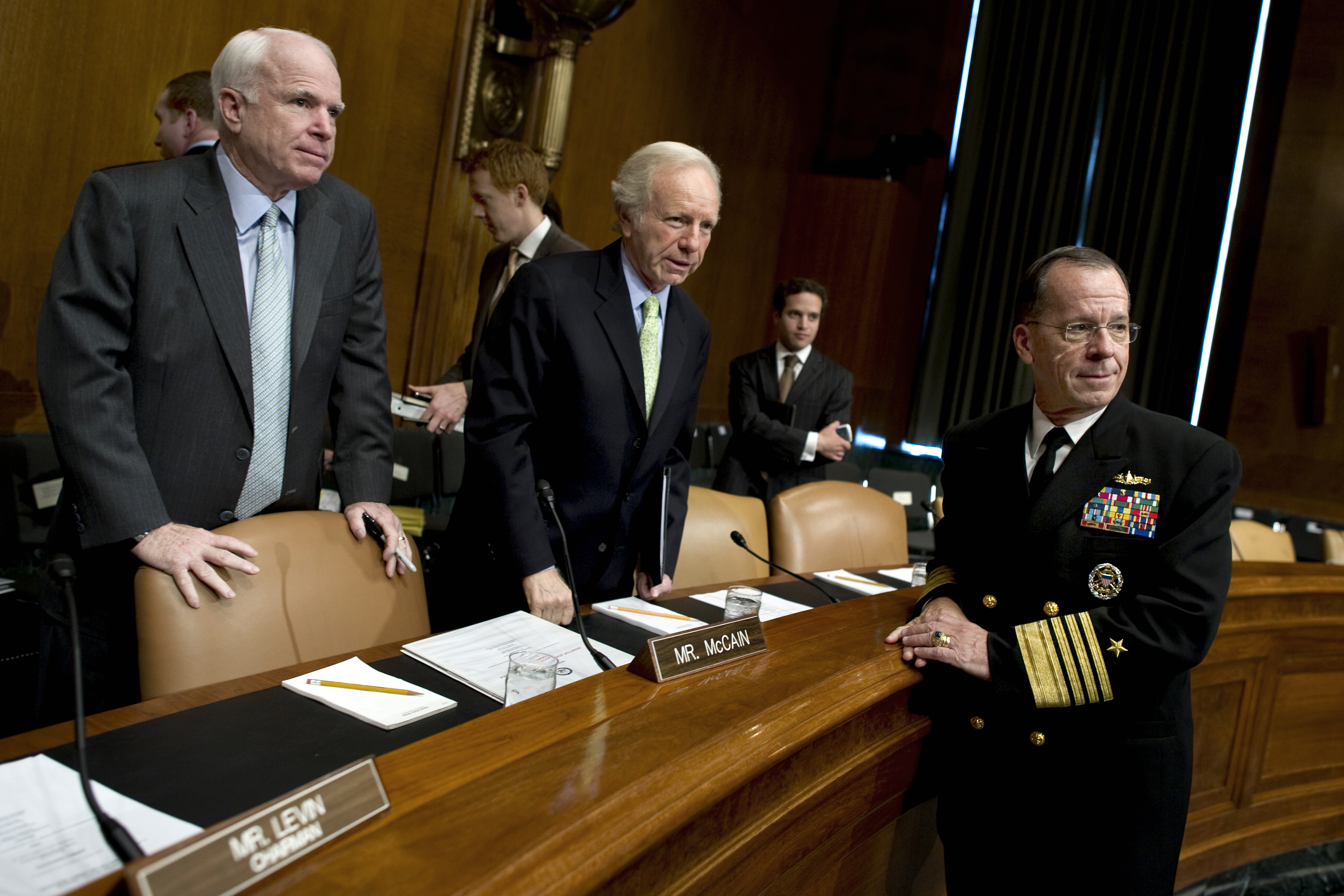
Senators Lieberman and John McCain talk with Navy Adm. Mike Mullen, chairman of the Joint Chiefs of Staff before a Senate Armed Services Committee hearing

At the 20 July launching of the 2004 Committee on the Present Danger, Joe Lieberman and Senator Jon Kyl were identified as the honorary co-chairs. The Committee on the Present Danger (CPD) is a hawkish, anti-communist "advocacy organization" and lobbying group first founded in 1950 and re-formed in 1976 to push for larger defense budgets and arms buildups, to counter the Soviet Union. It reformed for the third time in 2004 in support of the war on terror.

=== Defense spending ===
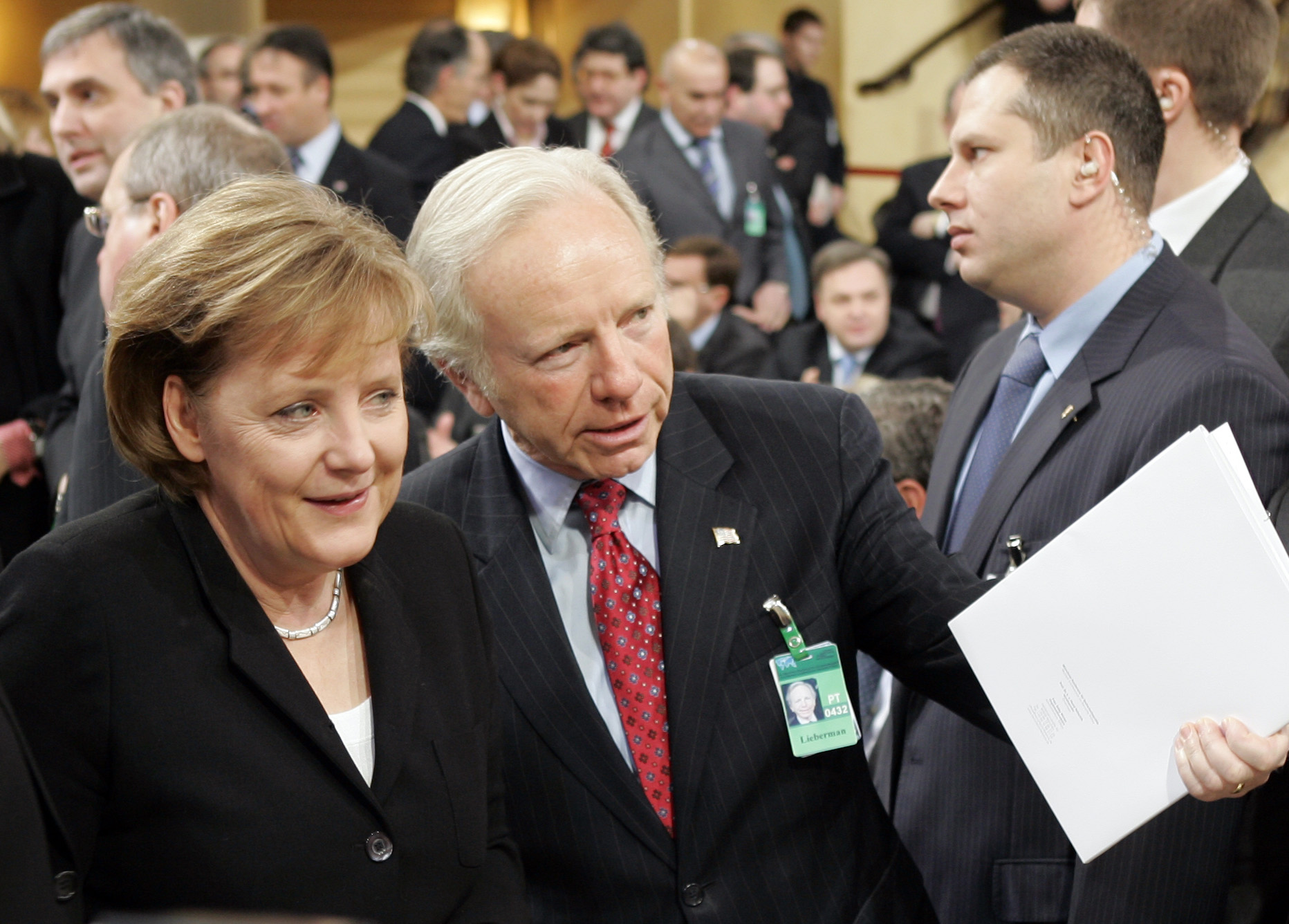
Senator Liebermann with German Chancellor Angela Merkel at 2007 Munich Security Conference

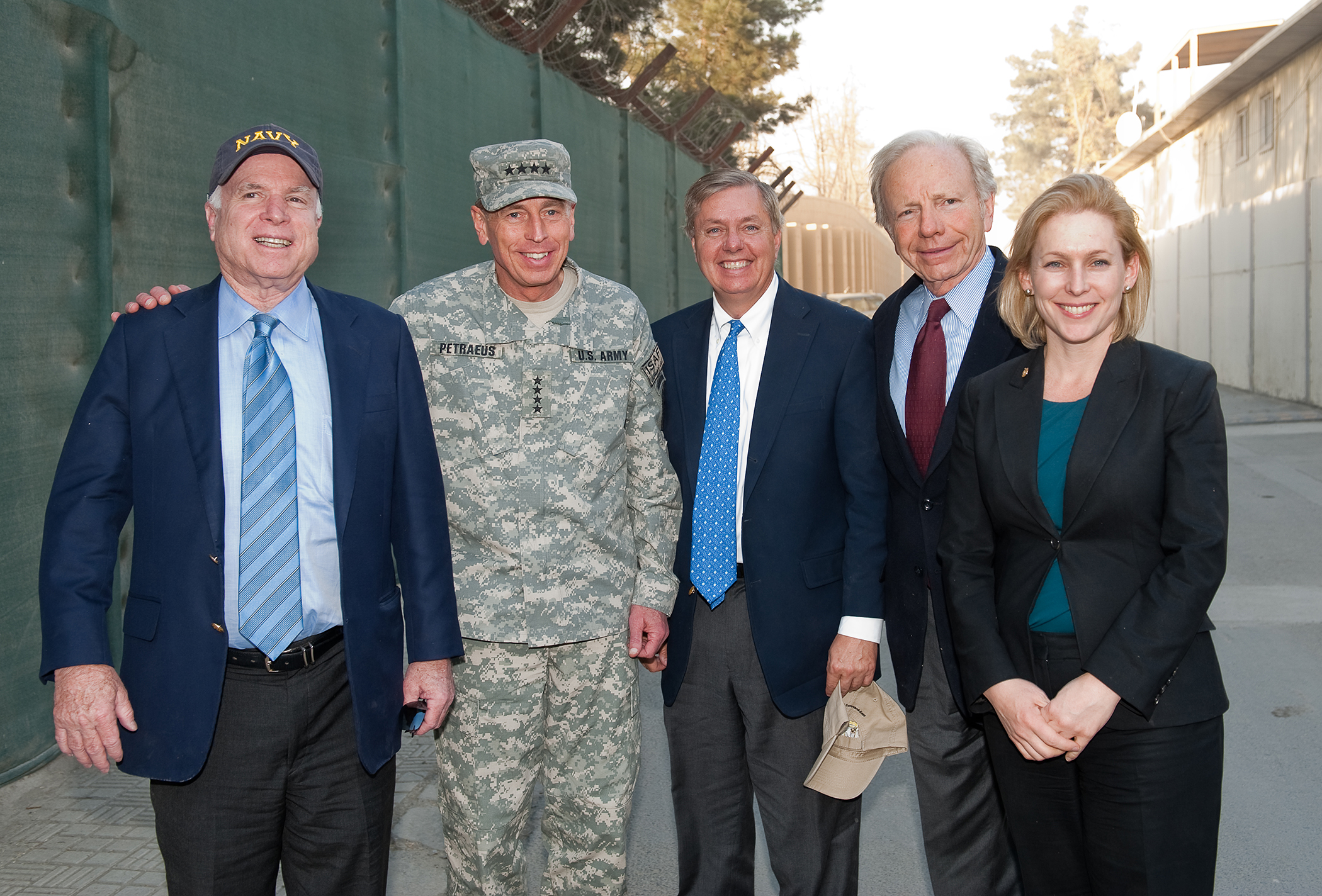
Senator Liebermann with bipartisan delegation John McCain (R-AZ), Lindsey Graham (R-SC) and Kirsten Gillibrand (D-NY) visit International Security Assistance Force in Afghanistan and Commander of NATO and ISAF David H. Petraeus in 2010

Lieberman, "a hawk on foreign policy, is long considered a friend of defense contractors, both in Connecticut and across the country." He is "a powerful proponent for robust Pentagon spending and weapons programs." Michael E. O'Hanlon of the Brookings Institution said of Lieberman: "He is a giant of the Senate, to me just as important on national security as Kennedy was on health or Bradley on finance or Domenici on the deficit." "Lieberman cemented his favorable reputation with defense firms when he advocated for more models of combat systems like the Lockheed Martin-made F-22 fighter and the Boeing-built C-17 air lifter even when Air Force and Pentagon officials argued against them."

=== Free trade ===
Lieberman supported the North American Free Trade Agreement (NAFTA) and continued to do so. During a 2004 Democratic presidential primary debate in South Carolina, he said, "though it's cost some jobs, has actually netted out 900,000 new jobs that were created by NAFTA". Lieberman also voted for the Central America-United States-Free Trade Agreement (CAFTA) in 2005.

Lieberman was also the co-author of the US–China Relations Act that would create new incentives in bilateral relations with China. He voted for the U.S./China World Trade Organization (WTO) Accession agreement in 2000.

=== Geneva Conventions ===
Lieberman supported the Alberto Gonzales policy memo on the application of provisions of the Geneva Conventions. He believed "the decision was, in my opinion, a reasonable one, and ultimately a progressive one." He agreed with Gonzales in describing certain provisions of Geneva Conventions, specifically "that a captured enemy be afforded such things as commissary privileges, script advances of monthly pay, athletic uniforms and scientific instruments" as "quaint". He also agreed with the legal decision that al Qaeda's members "were not entitled to prisoner of war status." In 2006, the United States Supreme Court ruled in Hamdan v. Rumsfeld that "at least" Common Article 3 of the Geneva Conventions is applicable to combatants "in the territory of" a signatory of the Conventions.

=== Homeland security ===
As Chairman of the Senate Committee on Homeland Security and Governmental Affairs (formerly the Governmental Affairs Committee) in 2001, Lieberman proposed forming the Department of Homeland Security, a proposal that passed into law in 2002. As ranking member of the committee from 2003 to 2007, he played a leading role in the passage of homeland security legislation such as the Intelligence Reform and Terrorism Prevention Act, the SAFE Port Act, and the Post-Katrina Emergency Management Reform Act, and in the investigation of the Bush administration's response to Hurricane Katrina. In January 2007 he became chairman again of the Senate Homeland Security and Governmental Affairs Committee, where he led efforts to pass the Implementing Recommendations of the 9/11 Commission Act of 2007.

=== Cuba ===
Senator Lieberman was a member of the Congressional Cuba Democracy Caucus.

=== Iraq ===
Lieberman sponsored S.J. Res.46, the Senate version of H.J. Res. 114, that is, the Authorization for Use of Military Force Against Iraq Resolution of 2002, also called the Iraq Resolution.

Lieberman defended his support of the Iraq Resolution; in a November 29, 2005 op-ed piece for The Wall Street Journal, he praised the efforts of the U.S. military in the occupation of Iraq and criticized both parties:

"I am disappointed by Democrats who are more focused on how President Bush took America into the war in Iraq almost three years ago, and by Republicans who are more worried about whether the war will bring them down in next November's elections, than they are concerned about how we continue the progress in Iraq in the months and years ahead."

Later, on December 7, 2005, Lieberman said, "It is time for Democrats who distrust President Bush to acknowledge that he will be Commander-in-Chief for three more critical years, and that in matters of war we undermine Presidential credibility at our nation's peril. It is time for Republicans in the White House and Congress who distrust Democrats to acknowledge that greater Democratic involvement and support in the war in Iraq is critical to rebuilding the support of the American people that is essential to our success in that war. It is time for Americans and we their leaders to start working together again on the war on terrorism. To encourage that new American partnership, I propose that the President and the leadership of Congress establish a bipartisan Victory in Iraq Working Group, composed of members of both parties in Congress and high ranking national security officials of the Bush Administration."

Senate Minority Leader Harry Reid expressed disappointment with Lieberman, saying, "I've talked to Senator Lieberman, and unfortunately he is at a different place on Iraq than the majority of the American people." House Minority Leader Nancy Pelosi added, "I completely disagree with Lieberman. I believe that we have a responsibility to speak out if we think that the course of action that our country is not making the American people safer, making our military stronger and making the region more stable." Lieberman responded, "I've had this position for a long time – that we need to finish the job."

Lieberman's defense of the administration resulted in speculation that he was attempting to position himself to replace Secretary of Defense Donald Rumsfeld or another high-ranking government official, but Lieberman has denied having any desire for this. In 2005, media reports suggested that Lieberman might replace Secretary of Defense Donald Rumsfeld; Lieberman responded with, "It's a total fantasy, there's just no truth to it."

On June 22, 2006, Lieberman voted against two Democratic amendments to the annual defense appropriations bill, including S. 2766, which called for a withdrawal of U.S. troops from Iraq. S.2766 did not set a withdrawal deadline, but urged President Bush to start pulling U.S. forces out of Iraq in 2006. Both amendments were defeated in the Senate, 60–39. On the January 14, 2007 episode of Meet the Press, he attempted to link Iraq to the terrorist attacks of September 11, 2001, asserting that the U.S. was "attacked on 9/11 by the same enemy that we're fighting in Iraq today."

As late as January 20, 2011, Lieberman "continued to insist that Saddam Hussein was developing weapons of mass destruction even though none were ever found after the invasion of Iraq," and "also said that despite the enormous cost to the U.S. in blood, prestige and treasure he does not regret his vote for war and would do it all over again."

=== Iran ===
Lieberman was a vocal supporter in Congress for U.S. aerial attacks on Iran, justifying such action on the grounds of Iran's alleged support of anti-American forces in Iraq as well as its nuclear program.

=== Israel ===
Lieberman was "among the strongest backers of Israel on Capitol Hill." Mark Vogel, chairman of the pro-Israel National Action Committee (NACPAC), stated that "Joe Lieberman, without exception, no conditions ... is the No. 1 pro-Israel advocate and leader in Congress. There is nobody who does more on behalf of Israel than Joe Lieberman. That is why he is incredibly important to the pro-Israel community." According to OpenSecrets, Lieberman ranked fourth on the list of candidates who received money from pro-Israel political action committees (PACs) in 2006.

In 2002, Lieberman sponsored a pro-Israel U.S. Senate Resolution (S. Res. 247) regarding the Middle East Conflict, "expressing solidarity with Israel in its constant efforts to fight against terror". In an interview with the Associated Press, Lieberman said Israel had a right to launch offensives in the Gaza Strip and Lebanon after two Israeli soldiers were kidnapped. He added that if Arab countries urged restraint by Hezbollah and Hamas, it "will allow the Israelis to cool down."

=== Nicaragua ===
In the 1980s, "he sided with the Reagan White House on aid to the Nicaraguan Contras."

=== Yemen ===
On December 27, 2009, Lieberman commented on reports that Umar Farouk Abdulmutallab, who had allegedly tried to set off a suicide bomb on Northwest Airlines Flight 253 on December 25, 2009, had subsequently confessed to being trained and equipped in Yemen. Lieberman called for the Obama administration to pre-emptively attack Yemen and to halt plans to repatriate Yemeni captives in Guantanamo.
