= Dick Durbin =

American politician and attorney (born 1944)

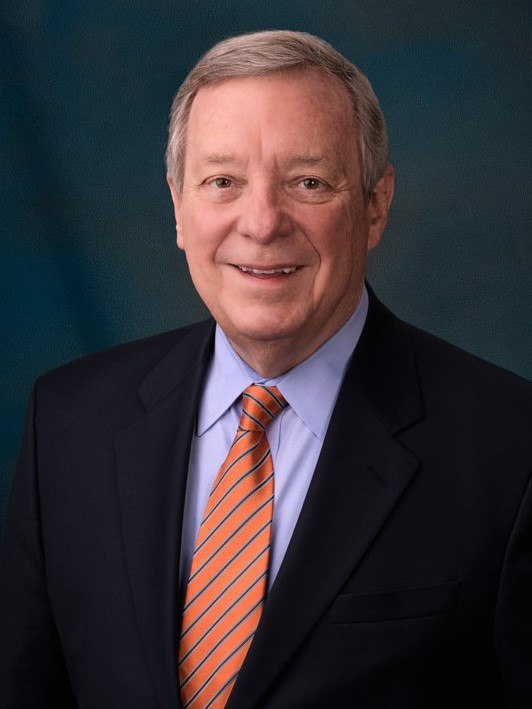
- Official portrait, 2022

United States Senator from Illinois
- Incumbent
- Assumed office January 3, 1997 Serving with Tammy Duckworth
- Preceded by: Paul Simon

Senate Minority Whip
- Incumbent
- Assumed office January 3, 2025
- Leader: Chuck Schumer
- Preceded by: John Thune
- In office January 3, 2015 – January 20, 2021
- Leader: Harry Reid; Chuck Schumer
- Preceded by: John Cornyn
- Succeeded by: John Thune
- In office January 3, 2005 – January 3, 2007
- Leader: Harry Reid
- Preceded by: Harry Reid
- Succeeded by: Trent Lott
Senate positions
Ranking Member of the Senate Judiciary Committee
Incumbent
Assumed office January 3, 2025
Preceded by	Lindsey Graham
Senate Majority Whip
In office January 20, 2021 – January 3, 2025
Leader	Chuck Schumer
Preceded by	John Thune
Succeeded by	John Barrasso
In office January 3, 2007 – January 3, 2015
Leader	Harry Reid
Preceded by	Mitch McConnell
Succeeded by	John Cornyn
Chair of the Senate Judiciary Committee
In office February 3, 2021 – January 3, 2025
Preceded by	Lindsey Graham
Succeeded by	Chuck Grassley

Member of the U.S. House of Representatives from Illinois's 20th district
- In office January 3, 1983 – January 3, 1997
- Preceded by: Paul Findley
- Succeeded by: John Shimkus

Personal details
- Born: Richard Joseph Durbin; November 21, 1944 (age 82) East St. Louis, Illinois, U.S.
- Party: Democratic
- Spouse: Loretta Schaefer (m. 1967)
- Children: 3 (Note: One child is deceased.)
- Education: Georgetown University (BS, JD)
- Website: Senate website Campaign website
- Durbin's voice Durbin supporting the DREAM Act; Recorded December 18, 2010

Richard Joseph Durbin (born November 21, 1944) is an American politician and attorney serving as the senior United States senator from Illinois, a seat he has held since 1997. A member of the Democratic Party, Durbin is in his fifth Senate term and has served since 2005 as the Senate Democratic Whip (the second-highest position in Democratic leadership in the Senate) and since 2025 as the Senate minority whip. He is the longest-serving Democratic whip since the position was established in 1913.

Durbin was born in East St. Louis, Illinois. After graduating from the School of Foreign Service and Georgetown University Law Center, he worked in state legal counsel throughout the 1970s. Durbin made an unsuccessful run for lieutenant governor of Illinois in 1978, and later maintained a private law practice and co-owned a pub in Springfield. Durbin was elected to the U.S. House of Representatives in 1982, representing the Springfield-based 20th congressional district.

After serving seven House terms, Durbin was elected to the U.S. Senate in 1996, and reelected in 2002, 2008, 2014, and 2020. He has served as the Senate Democratic whip since 2005—under Harry Reid until 2017, and under Chuck Schumer since 2017. During that time, he had two periods as Senate majority whip (from 2007 to 2015 and from 2021 to 2025), and three as minority whip (from 2005 to 2007, from 2015 to 2021, and since 2025). He became the oldest serving Democratic senator upon the death of Dianne Feinstein in 2023. As of 2024, Durbin is the longest-serving Senate party whip in U.S. history.

Durbin chaired the Senate Judiciary Committee from 2021 to 2025. He also led the Ketanji Brown Jackson Supreme Court nomination hearings and is the dean of Illinois's congressional delegation. On April 23, 2025, he announced that he would not seek reelection in 2026. He will be succeeded by fellow Democrat Juliana Stratton.

== Early life and education ==
Richard Joseph Durbin was born in East St. Louis, Illinois, on November 21, 1944, to an Irish-American father, William Durbin, and a Lithuanian-born mother, Anna (née Kutkin; Lithuanian: Ona Kutkaitė). He graduated from Assumption High School in East St. Louis in 1962. During his high school years he worked at a meatpacking plant. He earned a B.S. from the School of Foreign Service at Georgetown University in 1966. Durbin interned in Senator Paul Douglas's office during his senior year in college, and worked on Douglas's unsuccessful 1966 reelection campaign. Durbin adopted the nickname "Dick", which he had not previously used, after Douglas called him by that name.

Durbin earned his J.D. from Georgetown University Law Center in 1969 and was admitted to the Illinois bar later that year.

== Early political career ==
After graduating from law school, Durbin started a law practice in Springfield. He was legal counsel to Lieutenant Governor Paul Simon from 1969 to 1972, and then legal counsel to the Illinois State Senate Judiciary Committee from 1972 to 1982. Durbin was an unsuccessful Democratic candidate for the Illinois State Senate in 1976. From 1976 to 1981 he co-owned the Crow's Mill Pub in Springfield's Toronto neighborhood, which he later called a "crash course" in running a business. He ran for lieutenant governor in 1978 as the running mate of Illinois Comptroller Michael Bakalis. They were defeated by Republican incumbents James R. Thompson and Dave O'Neal. Durbin then worked for five years as an adjunct professor of medical law at the Southern Illinois University School of Medicine while maintaining his law practice.

== U.S. House of Representatives (1983–1997) ==
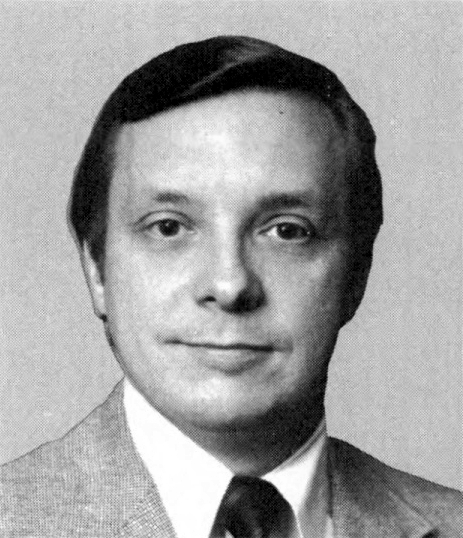
Durbin's official portrait in the 98th Congress, 1983

In 1982, Durbin won the Democratic nomination in Illinois's 20th congressional district, which included Decatur and most of Springfield. He scored a 1,400-vote victory, defeating 22-year incumbent Republican Paul Findley, a U.S. Navy veteran, whose district lines had been substantially redrawn to remove rural farms and add economically depressed Decatur. This replaced 35% of the voters in Findley's old district and included more Democrats as part of the decennial redistricting. Durbin's campaign emphasized unemployment and financial difficulties facing farmers, and told voters that electing him would send "a message to Washington and to President Reagan that our economic policies are not working". His usage of the term "Forgottonia" during the campaign is a notable moment in the region's history. Durbin also benefited from donations by pro-Israel groups, especially AIPAC, that opposed Findley's advocacy on behalf of the Palestine Liberation Organization (PLO). In the years before the 1996 Senate election Durbin was reelected to the House six times, rarely facing substantial opposition and winning more than 55% of the vote in each election except 1994.

== U.S. Senate (1997–present) ==
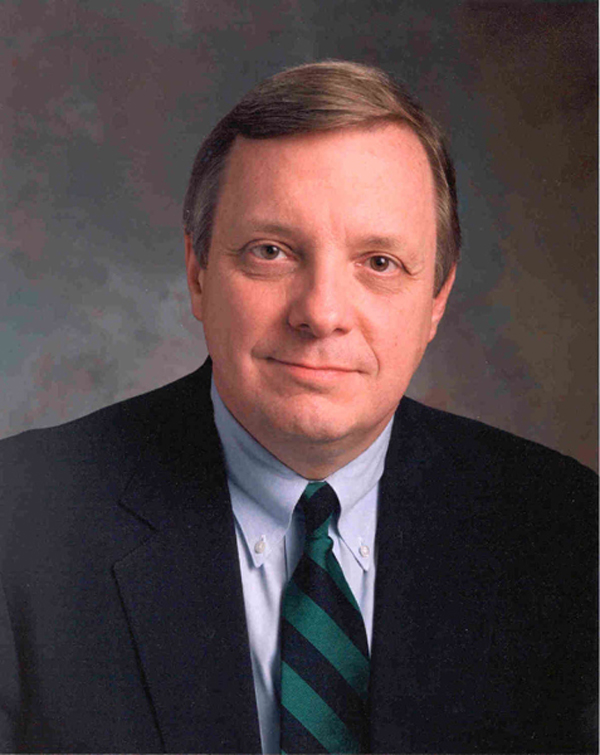
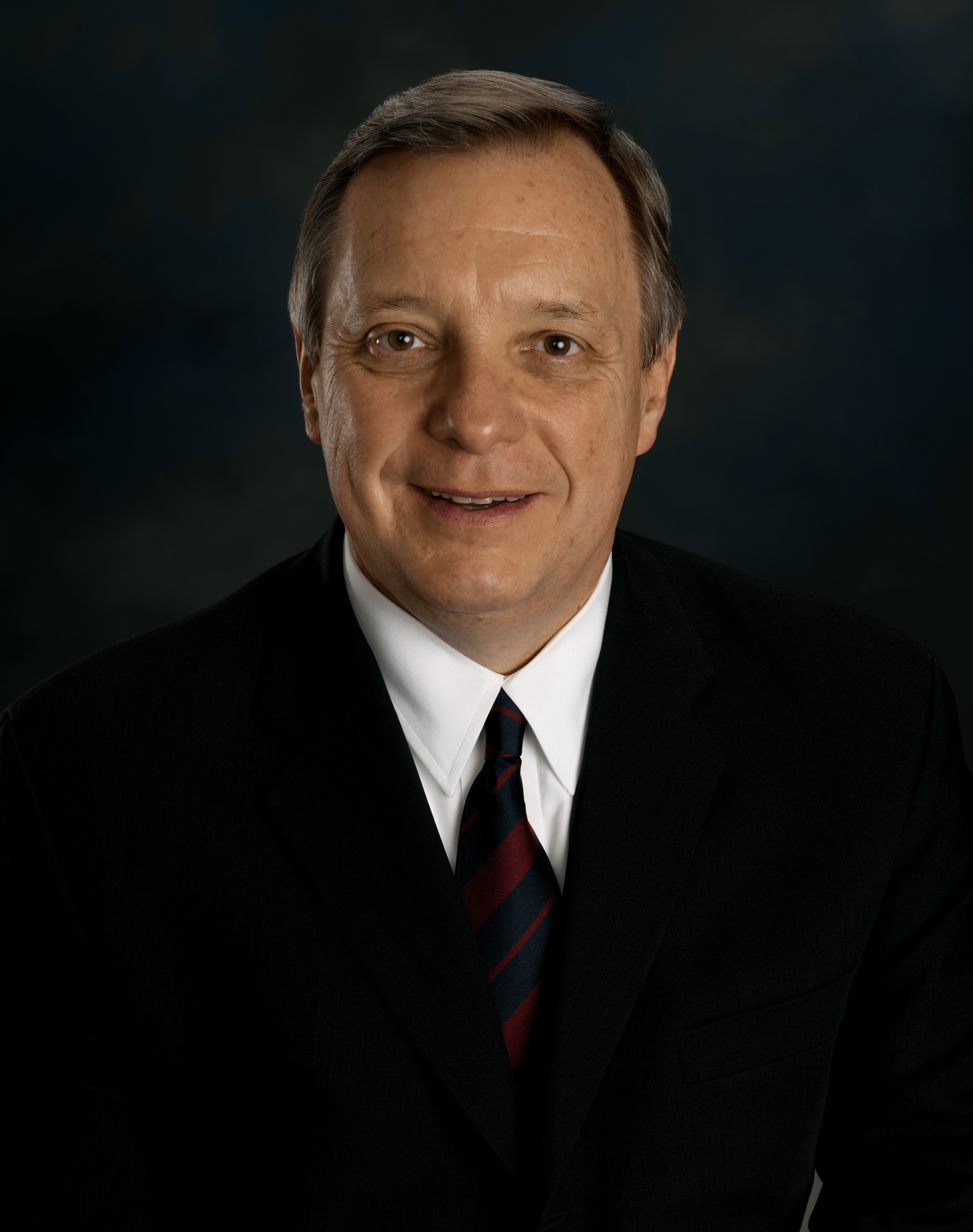
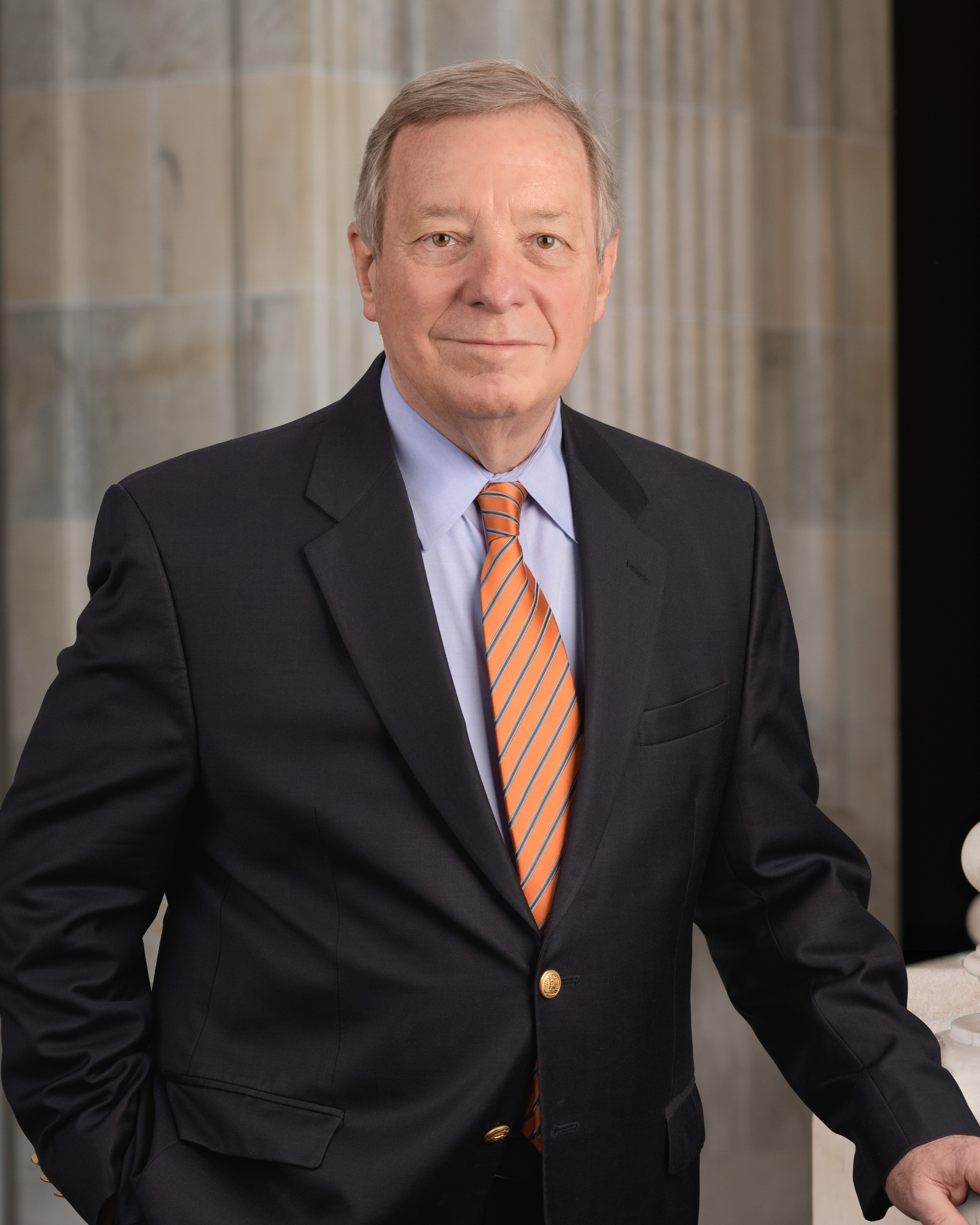
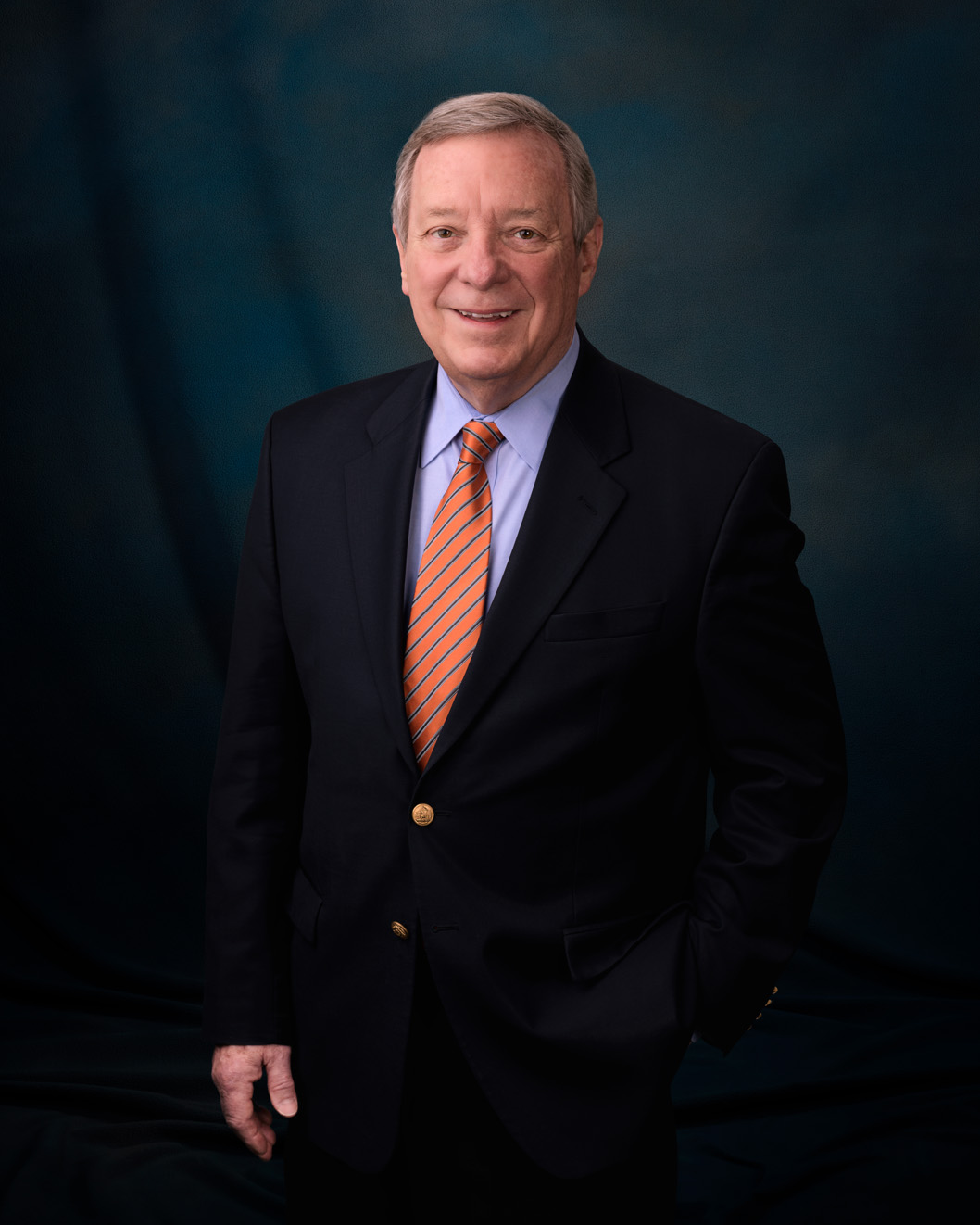
Durbin's official Senate portraits over the years

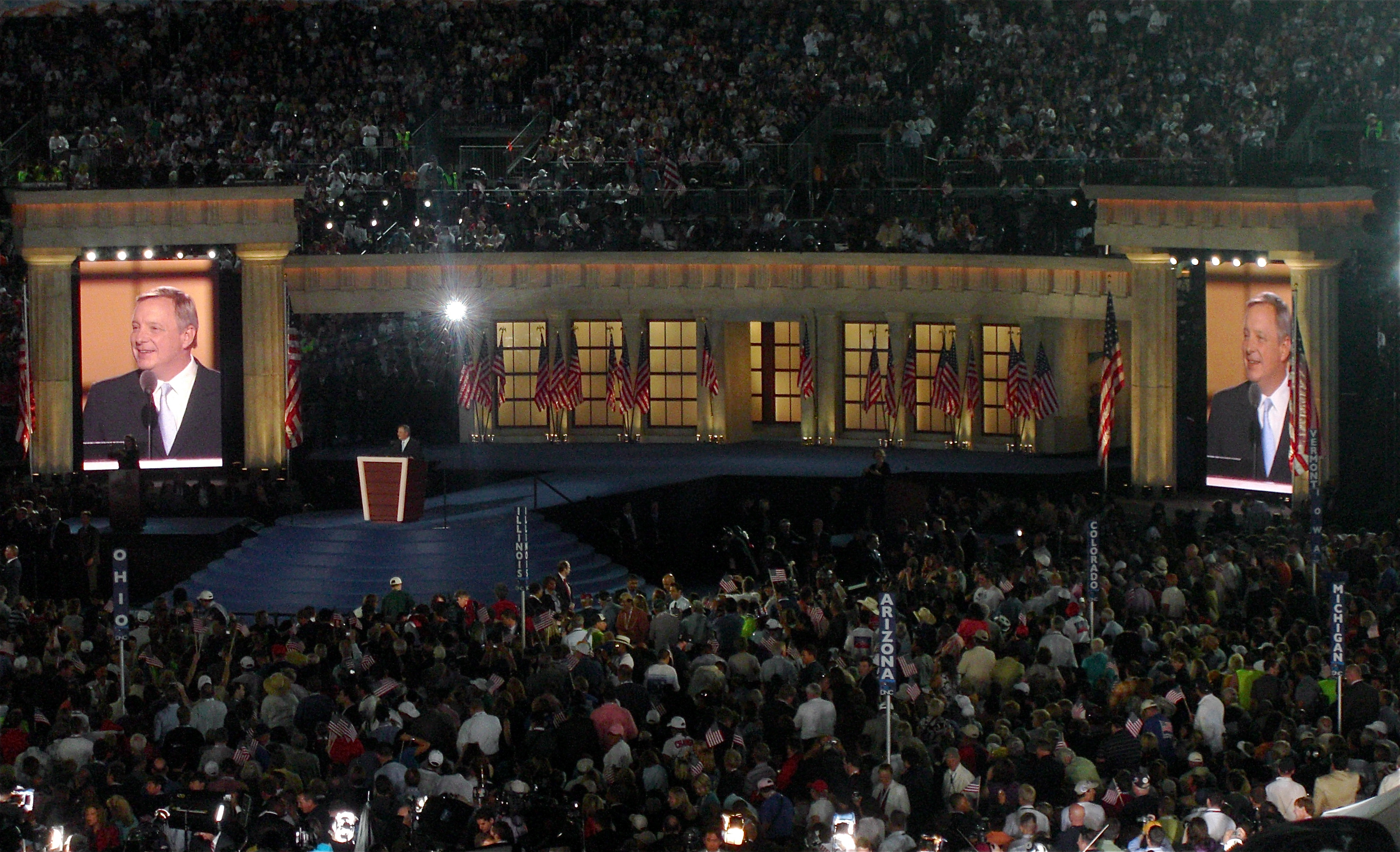
Durbin speaking during the final night of the 2008 Democratic National Convention in Denver, Colorado, introducing his party's nominee, fellow Illinoisan Barack Obama

In 1996, Durbin defeated Pat Quinn to become the Democratic nominee to replace the retiring Senator Paul Simon, a longtime friend. He faced Republican State Representative Al Salvi in the general election. Although the election had been expected to be competitive, Durbin benefited from Bill Clinton's 18-point win in Illinois that year and defeated Salvi by 15 points. He was reelected in 2002, 2008, 2014, and 2020, each time by at least 10 points.

=== 119th United States Congress Committee assignments ===
- Committee on Agriculture, Nutrition, and Forestry
- Committee on Appropriations
- Committee on the Judiciary (Ranking Member)

=== Caucus memberships ===
- Bi-Cameral High-Speed & Intercity Passenger Rail Caucus
- Caucus on International Narcotics Control (co-chair)
- International Conservation Caucus
- Senate Diabetes Caucus
- Senate Hunger Caucus (co-chair)
- Senate Science, Technology, Engineering, and Math Education Caucus (co-chair)
- Senate Taiwan Caucus
- Sportsmen's Caucus
- Congressional COPD Caucus (co-chair)
- Senate Ukraine Caucus (co-chair)
- Afterschool Caucuses
- Congressional NextGen 9-1-1 Caucus
- Congressional Coalition on Adoption

=== Leadership ===
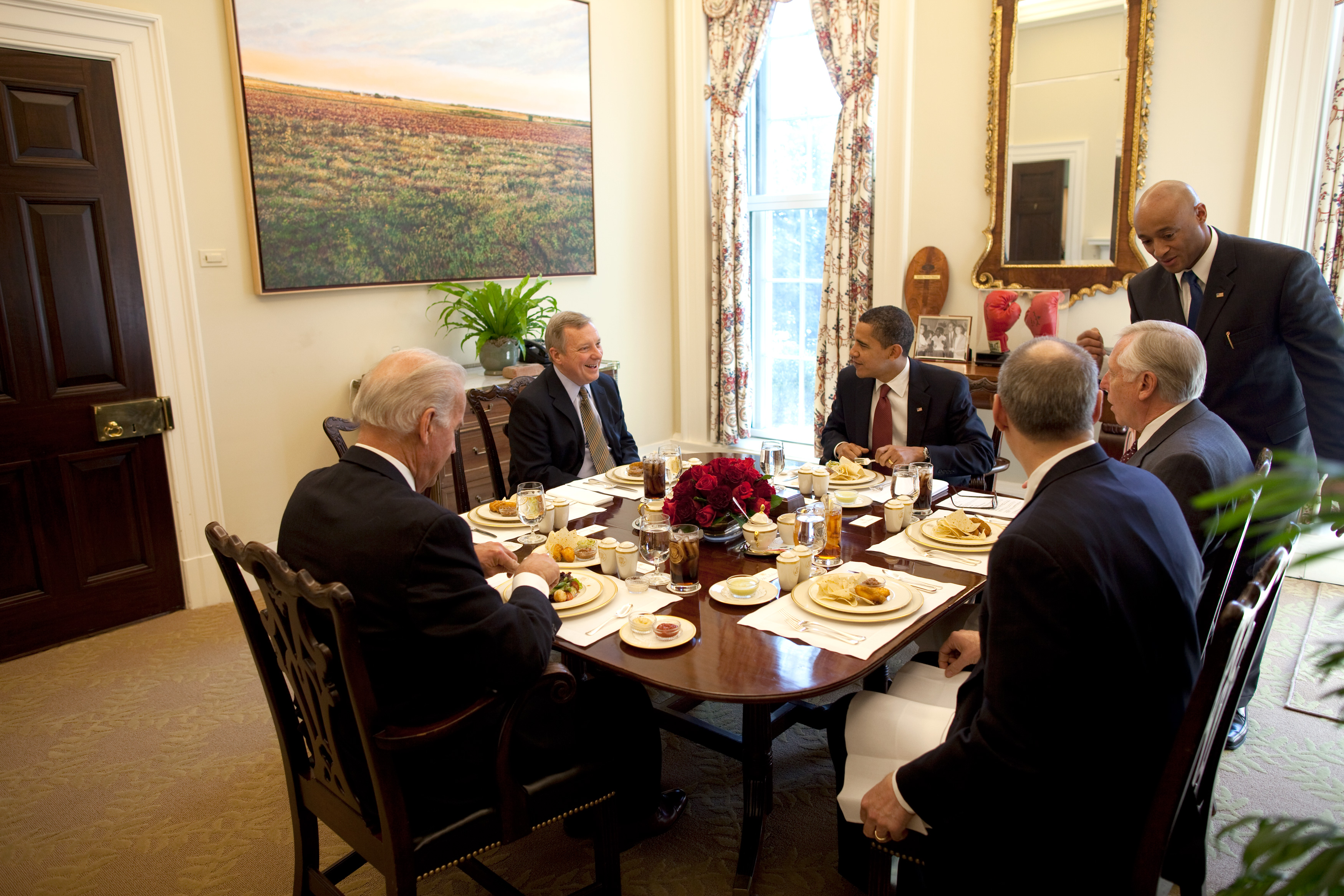
Durbin eating lunch with President Barack Obama, Vice President Joe Biden, and House Majority Leader Steny Hoyer

In November 1998, Senate Minority Leader Tom Daschle appointed Durbin Assistant Democratic Whip. After the 2004 election, Durbin became the Democratic Whip in the 109th Congress. He became the first senator from Illinois to serve as a Senate Whip since Everett Dirksen in the late 1950s, and the fifth to serve in Senate leadership. Durbin served as assistant minority leader from 2005 to 2007, when the Democrats became the majority party in the Senate. He then assumed the role of assistant majority leader, or majority whip.

In addition to his caucus duties, Durbin chairs the Subcommittee on Human Rights and the Subcommittee on Financial Services and General Government.

In 2000, Democratic presidential nominee Al Gore reportedly considered asking Durbin to be his running mate for Vice President of the United States. Gore ultimately chose Connecticut Senator Joe Lieberman.

When Majority Leader Harry Reid faced a difficult reelection fight in 2010, some pundits predicted a possibly heated fight to succeed him between Durbin and Senator Chuck Schumer, who is well known for his fund-raising prowess. Reid's reelection rendered such speculation moot. Upon Reid's retirement announcement in 2015, Durbin, Reid, and Schumer were aligned in elevating Schumer to party leader and Durbin to retain the Whip position.

In 2021, Durbin became Senate Majority Whip again for the 117th Congress, as well as becoming chair of the Senate Judiciary Committee. This is the first time that the whip of either party has served as chair of this committee.

== Political positions ==
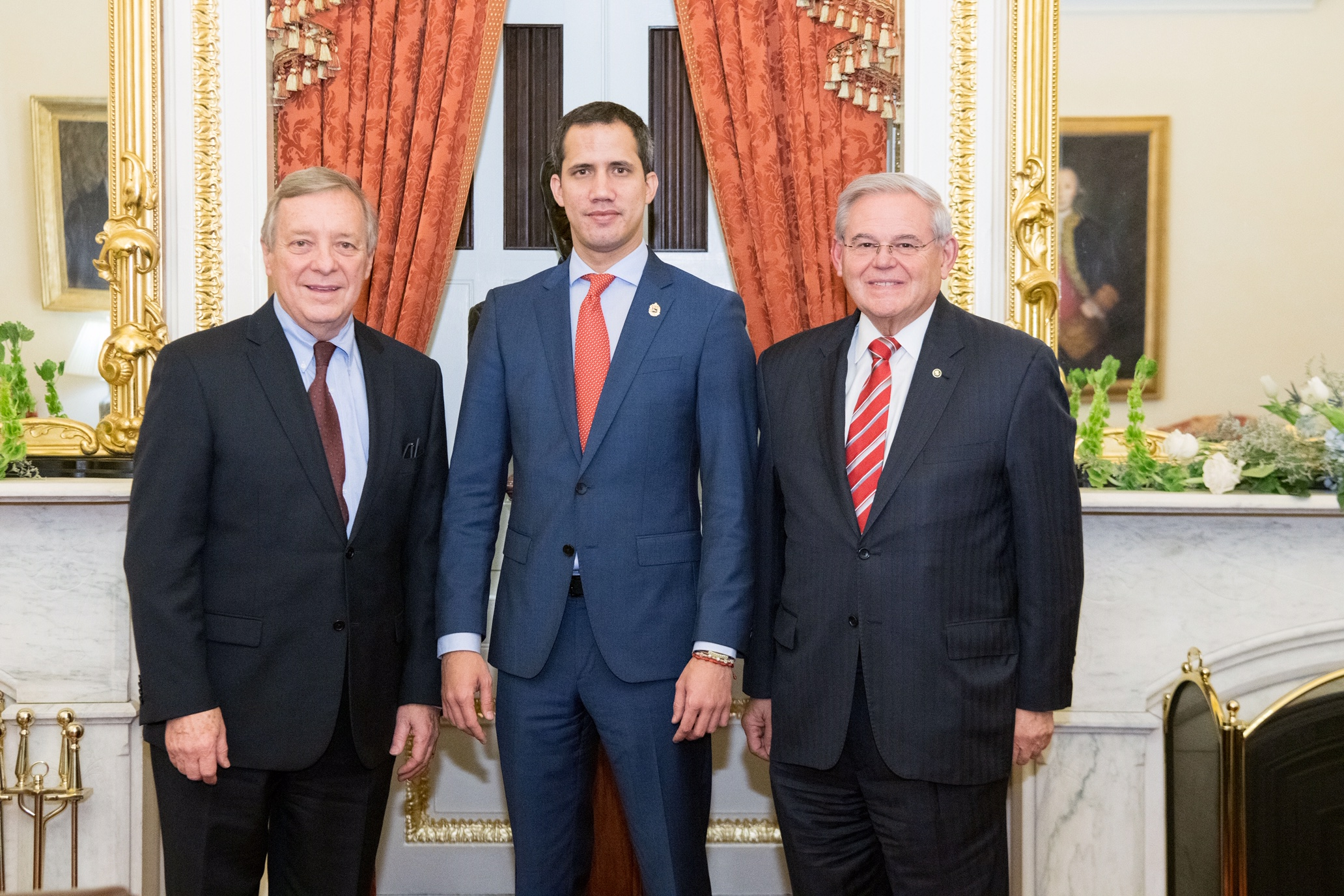
Durbin and Bob Menendez with Venezuela's interim President Juan Guaidó in February 2020

In 2006, the National Journal rated Durbin as the most liberal U.S. senator. According to the 2019 GovTrack report card, he had the 10th-most left-leaning voting record in the Senate. The American Conservative Union gave him a 5% lifetime conservative rating in 2020.

=== Social issues ===
==== Abortion ====
During his first term in Congress, Durbin supported upholding existing restrictions on abortion and imposing new limitations, including a constitutional amendment that would have nullified Roe v. Wade. Beginning in his second Senate term, he reversed his position and has since voted to maintain access to abortion, including support for Medicaid funding of it, and opposed any limitation he considers a practical or potential encroachment upon Roe. Durbin has maintained that this reversal came about due to personal reflection and his growing awareness of potentially harmful implications of his previous policy with respect to women facing dangerous pregnancies. He said, "I still oppose abortion and would try my best to convince any woman in my family to carry the baby to term. But I believe that ultimately the decision must be made by the woman, her doctor, her family, and her conscience."

In September 2020, Durbin voted to confirm judges Stephen McGlynn and David W. Dugan, who have criticized Supreme Court rulings such as Roe, to lifetime appointments to the federal judiciary in Illinois. Durbin opposed the 2022 overturning of Roe v. Wade, saying, "millions of Americans are waking up in a country where they have fewer rights than their parents and grandparents."

==== Criminal justice reform ====
In July 2017, Durbin and Senators Cory Booker, Elizabeth Warren, and Kamala Harris introduced the Dignity for Incarcerated Women Act, legislation implementing a ban on the shackling of pregnant women and mandating that the Federal Bureau of Prisons form superior visitation policies for parents and provide parenting classes and health products such as tampons and pads. The bill also restricted prison employees from entering restrooms of the opposite sex except in pressing circumstances.

In December 2018, Durbin voted for the First Step Act, legislation aimed at reducing recidivism rates among federal prisoners by expanding job training and other programs in addition to expanding early-release programs and modifying sentencing laws such as mandatory minimum sentences for nonviolent drug offenders, "to more equitably punish drug offenders."

==== Freedom of expression ====
In 2007, as Senate Majority Whip, Durbin said on record, "It's time to reinstitute the Fairness Doctrine."

In 2010, Durbin cosponsored and passed from committee the Combating Online Infringement and Counterfeits Act, a bill to combat media piracy by blacklisting websites. Many who oppose the bill argue that it violates First Amendment rights and promotes censorship. The announcement of the bill was followed by a wave of protest from digital rights activists, including the Electronic Frontier Foundation, calling it censorship and saying that action could be taken against all users of sites on which only some users are uploading infringing material.

Durbin sponsored the PROTECT IP Act.

==== Gun control ====
Durbin received an "F" grade from the National Rifle Association (NRA) for his consistent support for gun control. Durbin supports a national assault weapon ban.

Durbin sent Attorney General Jeff Sessions a letter in May 2017 asking for support in expanding the Chicago Police Department's violence prevention programs by expanding access to the Strategic Decision Support Centers and the National Integrated Ballistic Information Network. He also asked the Justice Department to support the Stop Illegal Trafficking in Firearms Act, which would stop illegal state-to-state gun trafficking.

In response to mass shootings, such as the Orlando nightclub shooting and Las Vegas shooting, Durbin has repeatedly called for expanded gun control laws, saying that Congress would be "complicit" in the shooting deaths of people if it did not act.

After the October 2017 Las Vegas shooting, Durbin was one of 24 senators to sign a letter to National Institutes of Health (NIH) Director Francis Collins espousing the view that it was critical that the NIH "dedicate a portion of its resources to the public health consequences of gun violence" at a time when 93 Americans die per day from gun-related fatalities and noted that the Dickey Amendment did not prohibit objective, scientific inquiries into shooting death prevention.

In January 2019, Durbin was one of 40 senators to introduce the Background Check Expansion Act, a bill that would require background checks for either the sale or transfer of all firearms including all unlicensed sellers. Exceptions to the bill's background check requirement included transfers between members of law enforcement, loaning firearms for either hunting or sporting events temporarily, providing firearms as gifts to members of one's immediate family, firearms transferred as part of an inheritance, or giving a firearm to another person temporarily for immediate self-defense.

==== HIV/AIDS ====
In March 2007, Durbin introduced the African Health Capacity Investment Act of 2007 to the Senate. The bill was designed so that over three years, the U.S. would supply over $600 million to improve medical facilities and working conditions, and to recruit and train doctors from all over North America. In December 2007, Durbin and two other senators co-sponsored Senator John Kerry's Nondiscrimination in Travel and Immigration Act. In March 2007, he joined 32 other senators to co-sponsor the Early Treatment for HIV Act.

==== Immigration ====
Durbin is the chief proponent of the Development, Relief and Education for Alien Minors (DREAM) Act. The bill would provide certain students who entered or were brought to the nation illegally with the opportunity to earn conditional permanent residency if they arrived in the U.S. as children; graduated from a U.S. high school; have been in the country continuously for at least five years before the bill's enactment; submit biometric data; pass a criminal background check; and complete two years toward a four-year degree from an accredited university or complete at least two years in the military within a five-year period. In 2013, the Immigrant Legal Resource Center presented Durbin with the inaugural Nancy Pelosi Award for Immigration & Civil Rights Policy for his leadership on this issue.

On January 28, 2013, Durbin was a member of a bipartisan group of eight senators, the Gang of Eight, which announced principles for comprehensive immigration reform (CIR).

In April 2018, Durbin was one of five senators to send acting director of Immigration and Customs Enforcement Thomas Homan a letter about standards the agency used to determine how to detain a pregnant woman, requesting that pregnant women not be held in custody except in extraordinary circumstances after reports "that ICE has failed to provide critical medical care to pregnant women in immigration detention—resulting in miscarriages and other negative health outcomes".

In July 2018, Durbin said Homeland Security Secretary Kirstjen Nielsen should resign over the Trump administration family separation policy. He argued it "is and was a cruel policy inconsistent with the bedrock values of the nation," adding someone "in this administration has to accept responsibility." Tyler Houlton, a DHS spokesman, replied on Twitter that "obstructionists in Congress should get to work".

In July 2019, after reports that the Trump administration intended to end protections of spouses, parents and children of active-duty service members from deportation, Durbin was one of 22 senators to sign a letter led by Tammy Duckworth arguing that the program allowed service members the ability "to fight for the United States overseas and not worry that their spouse, children, or parents will be deported while they are away" and that the program's termination would cause personal hardship for service members in combat.

In October 2019, Durbin blocked the passage of S.386, the Fairness for High-Skilled Immigrants Act, which aims to eliminate the per-country numerical limitation for all employment-based immigrants and to increase the per-country limitation for all family-sponsored immigrants from 7% to 15%.

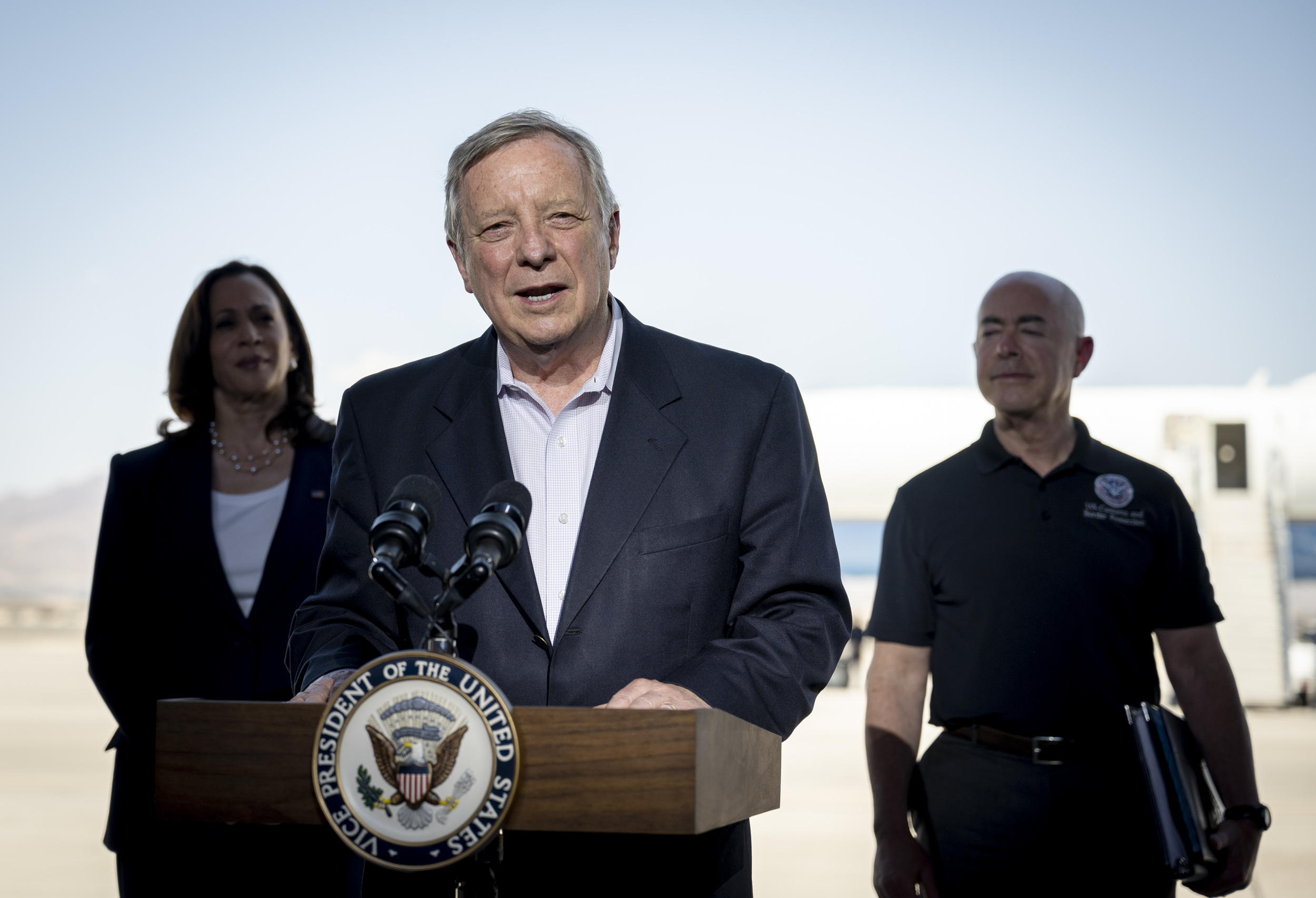
Durbin speaks at a press conference in El Paso, Texas, with U.S. Homeland Security Secretary Alejandro Mayorkas, along with Vice President Kamala Harris and Representative Veronica Escobar.

Durbin argued that bill S.386 would prioritize people of Indian and Chinese origin, who have been in the green card backlog for years, at the expense of future immigrants from other countries. After blocking S.386, he proposed his own bill, which would almost triple the number of employment-based green cards and eliminate country caps. Durbin agreed that his bill would not pass in the current administration and promised for a bipartisan agreement to pass S.386.

==== Tobacco regulation ====
In 1987, Durbin introduced major tobacco regulation legislation in the House. The bill banned cigarette smoking on airline flights of two hours or less. Representative C. W. Bill Young joined him in saying that the rights of smokers to smoke ends where their smoking affects other people's health and safety, such as on airplanes. The bill passed as part of the 1988 transportation spending bill. In 1989, Congress banned cigarette smoking on all domestic airline flights.

In March 1994, Durbin proposed an amendment to the Improving America's Schools Act that required schools receiving federal drug prevention money to teach elementary and secondary students about the dangers of tobacco, drugs, and alcohol. The amendment also required schools to warn students about tobacco and teach them how to resist peer pressure to smoke.

In February 2008, Durbin called on Congress to support a measure that would allow the Food and Drug Administration to oversee the tobacco industry. The measure would require companies to disclose the contents of tobacco products, restrict advertising and promotions, and mandate the removal of harmful ingredients from tobacco products. It would also prohibit tobacco companies from using terms like "low risk", "light", and "mild" on the packaging.

Durbin attributes his stance against tobacco smoking to his father, who smoked two packs of cigarettes a day and died of lung cancer.

=== Economic issues ===
==== Child care ====
In 2019, Durbin and 34 other senators introduced the Child Care for Working Families Act. The bill was expected to create 770,000 new child care jobs and ensure families under 75% of the state median income would not pay for child care, with higher-earning families having to pay "their fair share for care on a sliding scale, regardless of the number of children they have." The legislation also supported universal access to high-quality preschool programs for all three- and four-year-olds. Additionally, it would have changed child care compensation and training to aid both teachers and caregivers. The bill was referred to the Senate Committee on Health, Education, Labor, and Pensions, where it did not receive a hearing or vote.

==== Election finance ====
Durbin reintroduced the Fair Elections Now Act during the 112th Congress. The bill would provide public funds to candidates who do not take political donations larger than $100 from any donor.

==== Environment ====
Among Durbin's legislative causes are environmental protection, particularly the protection of the Arctic National Wildlife Refuge. The League of Conservation Voters gave him a rating of 89%. Sierra Club gave him a 90% rating.

==== 2008 financial crisis ====
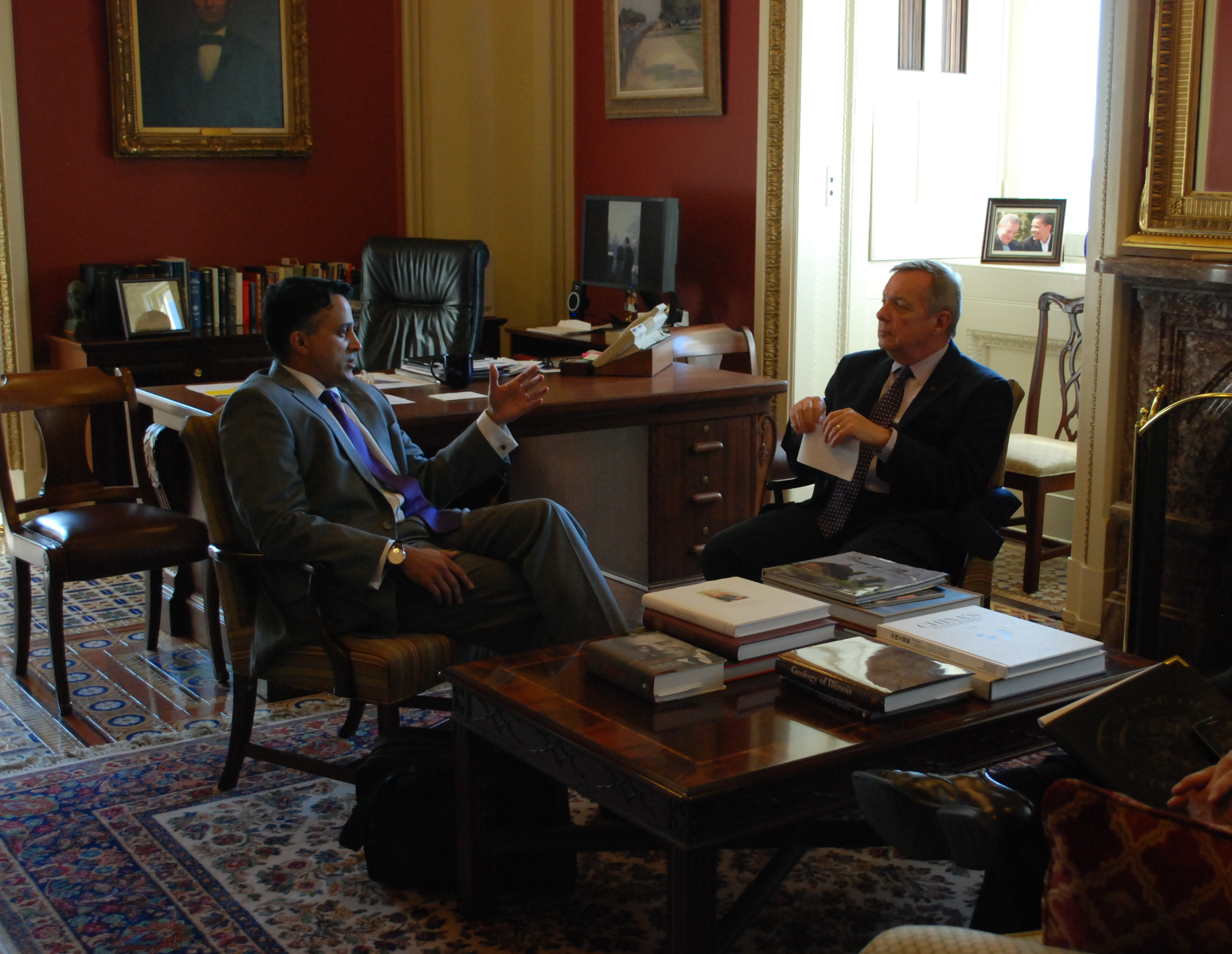
Durbin meeting with Raj Date, then acting director of the Consumer Financial Protection Bureau, to discuss helping consumers compare bank fees

On September 18, 2008, Durbin attended a closed meeting with congressional leaders, then-Treasury Secretary Henry Paulson and Federal Reserve Chairman Ben Bernanke, and was urged to craft legislation to help financially troubled banks. That same day (trade effective the next day), Durbin sold mutual fund shares worth $42,696 and reinvested it all with Warren Buffett.

On February 26, 2009, Durbin introduced the Protecting Consumers from Unreasonable Credit Rates Act of 2009, calling for a maximum annual interest rate cap of 36%, including all interest and fees. The bill was intended to put an end to predatory lending activities.

In an April 27, 2009, interview with WJJG talk radio host Ray Hanania, Durbin said banks were responsible for the 2008 financial crisis. He added that many of the banks responsible for the crisis "own the place", referring to the power the banking lobby wields on Capitol Hill.

==== Trade ====
In January 2005, Durbin changed his longstanding position on sugar tariffs and price supports. After several years of voting to keep sugar quotas and price supports, he now favors abolishing the program. "The sugar program depended on congressmen like me from states that grew corn", Durbin said, referring to the fact that, though they were formerly a single entity, the sugar market and the corn syrup market are now largely separate.

In May 2006, Durbin campaigned to maintain a $0.54 per gallon tariff on imported ethanol. He justified the tariff by joining Barack Obama in stating that "ethanol imports are neither necessary nor a practical response to current gasoline prices", arguing instead that domestic ethanol production is sufficient and expanding.

==== Rod Blagojevich ====
Shortly after Governor Rod Blagojevich's arrest on federal corruption charges on December 9, 2008, Durbin called for the Illinois legislature to quickly pass legislation for a special election to fill then-President-elect Barack Obama's vacant Senate seat. He said that no Senate appointment of Blagojevich's could produce a credible replacement. Durbin and Senate Majority Leader Harry Reid led all 50 members of the Senate Democratic Caucus in writing Blagojevich to urge him to resign and not name a successor to Obama.

==== Technology ====
In December 2025, Durbin and Lindsey Graham introduced the Sunset Section 230 Act, to repeal Section 230.

==== Transportation ====
Durbin has been a major proponent of expanded Amtrak funding and support.

=== Foreign and military policy ===
==== China ====
In April 2017, Durbin was among eight Democratic senators to sign a letter to President Trump noting government-subsidized Chinese steel had been placed into the American market in recent years below cost and had hurt the domestic steel industry and the iron ore industry that fed it, calling on President Trump to raise the steel issue with General Secretary of the Chinese Communist Party Xi Jinping in his meeting with him.

==== Darfur ====
On March 2, 2005, then-Senator Jon Corzine presented the Darfur Peace and Accountability Act (S. 495) to the Senate. Durbin was one of 40 senators to co-sponsor the bill. The bill asked all people involved in or deemed in some way responsible for the genocide in Darfur to be denied visas and entrance to the U.S.

In 2006, Durbin co-sponsored the Durbin-Leahy Amendment to the Supplemental Appropriations bill for emergency funding to instill peace in Darfur. In 2006, he also co-sponsored the Lieberman Resolution and the Clinton Amendment.

On June 7, 2007, Durbin introduced the Sudan Disclosure Enforcement Act, which was aimed "at enhancing the U.S. Government's ability to impose penalties on violators of U.S. sanctions against Sudan." The bill called for the U.N. Security Council to vote on sanctions against the Sudanese Government for the genocide in Darfur.

Durbin has voted for all Darfur-related legislation. In addition to the Darfur Peace and Accountability Act, he also supported the Civilian Protection No-Fly Zone Act, the Hybrid Force Resolution, and the Sudan Divestment Authorization Act.

==== Drone warfare ====
In April 2013, Durbin chaired a hearing in the Senate Judiciary Subcommittee on the Constitution, Civil Rights and Human Rights about the moral, legal and constitutional issues surrounding targeted killings and the use of drones. Durbin said, "Many in the national security community are concerned that we may undermine our counterterrorism efforts if we do not carefully measure the benefits and costs of targeted killing."

==== Myanmar ====
In October 2017, Durbin condemned the genocide of the Rohingya Muslim minority in Myanmar and called for a stronger response to it.

==== Guantanamo Bay ====
In 2005, Durbin compared the U.S. treatment of prisoners at Guantanamo Bay Naval Base to the atrocities committed by "Nazis, Soviets in their gulags, or some mad regime—Pol Pot or others—that had no concern for human beings." Demands that he apologize were initially rebuffed, but Durbin later apologized to the military for his remarks, which he said were "a very poor choice of words."

===== Guantanamo interrogation criticism =====
Durbin received media attention on June 14, 2005, when in the U.S. Senate chambers he compared interrogation techniques used at Camp X-Ray, Guantanamo Bay, as reported by the Federal Bureau of Investigation, to those utilized by such regimes as Nazi Germany, the Soviet Union, and the Khmer Rouge:

When you read some of the graphic descriptions of what has occurred here—I almost hesitate to put them in the record, and yet they have to be added to this debate. Let me read to you what one FBI agent saw. And I quote from his report:

On a couple of occasions, I entered interview rooms to find a detainee chained hand and foot in a fetal position to the floor, with no chair, food or water. Most times they urinated or defecated on themselves, and had been left there for 18–24 hours or more. On one occasion, the air conditioning had been turned down so far and the temperature was so cold in the room, that the barefooted detainee was shaking with cold. ... On another occasion, the [air conditioner] had been turned off, making the temperature in the unventilated room well over 100 degrees. The detainee was almost unconscious on the floor, with a pile of hair next to him. He had apparently been literally pulling his hair out throughout the night. On another occasion, not only was the temperature unbearably hot, but extremely loud rap music was being played in the room, and had been since the day before, with the detainee chained hand and foot in the fetal position on the tile floor.

If I read this to you and did not tell you that it was an FBI agent describing what Americans had done to prisoners in their control, you would most certainly believe this must have been done by Nazis, Soviets in their gulags, or some mad regime—Pol Pot or others—that had no concern for human beings. Sadly, that is not the case. This was the action of Americans in the treatment of their prisoners.

Durbin's comments drew widespread criticism that comparing U.S. actions to such regimes insulted the United States and victims of genocide. Radio host Rush Limbaugh and White House deputy chief of staff Karl Rove accused him of treason, while former Speaker of the House Newt Gingrich called on the Senate to censure him. Chicago Mayor Richard Daley, whose son Patrick was serving in U.S. Army, also called on Durbin to apologize for his remarks, saying that he thought it was a "disgrace to say that any man or woman in the military would act like that." John Wertheim, Democratic state party chairman of New Mexico, and Jim Pederson, Arizona Democratic party chairman, also criticized Durbin's remarks. The leader of the Veterans of Foreign Wars also demanded an apology, as did the Anti-Defamation League.

Durbin initially did not apologize, but on June 21, 2005, he went before the Senate, saying, "More than most people, a senator lives by his words ... occasionally words fail us, occasionally we will fail words."

Former The New Republic editor Andrew Sullivan praised Durbin for raising serious moral issues about U.S. policy. Other commentators, including commentator Markos Moulitsas Zúniga of Daily Kos, condemned Durbin for apologizing to his critics, arguing he made a mistake in making himself, rather than detention and torture concerns at Guantanamo Bay, the focus of media coverage.

==== Impeachment trials of Bill Clinton and Donald Trump ====
On February 12, 1999, Durbin joined all Democrats in the Senate in voting to acquit Bill Clinton on both impeachment articles in Clinton's impeachment trial. On February 5, 2020, Durbin voted to convict Donald Trump on both impeachment articles in Trump's first impeachment trial. On February 13, 2021, Durbin voted to convict Trump again in Trump's second impeachment trial.

==== 2001 invasion of Afghanistan ====
Durbin voted to approve the Authorization for Use of Military Force Against Terrorists. This act granted the executive broad military powers and was used to justify the 2001 U.S. invasion of Afghanistan and later military interventions.

==== Iraq War ====
On September 9, 2002, Durbin was the first of four Democratic senators (the others being Bob Graham, Dianne Feinstein, and Carl Levin) on the Select Committee on Intelligence (SSCI), responding to the George W. Bush administration's request for a joint resolution authorizing a preemptive war on Iraq without having prepared a National Intelligence Estimate (NIE), to ask Central Intelligence Director George Tenet to prepare an NIE on the status of Iraq's Weapon of mass destruction programs. Durbin was also one of few senators who read the resulting October 1, 2002, NIE, Iraq's Continuing Programs for Weapons of Mass Destruction.

On September 29, 2002, Durbin held a news conference in Chicago to announce that "absent dramatic changes" in the resolution, he would vote against the resolution authorizing war on Iraq. On October 2, at the first high-profile Chicago anti-Iraq War rally in Federal Plaza, he repeated his promise to oppose the resolution in a letter read during the rally.

On October 10, the U.S. Senate failed to pass Durbin's amendment to the resolution to strike "the continuing threat posed by Iraq" and insert "an imminent threat posed by Iraq's weapons of mass destruction", by a 30–70 vote, with most Democratic senators voting for the amendment and 21 joining all 49 Republican senators voting against it. On October 11, Durbin was one of 23 senators to vote against the joint resolution authorizing the Iraq War.

On April 25, 2007, Durbin said that as an intelligence committee member he knew in 2002 from classified information that the Bush Administration was misleading the American people into a war on Iraq, but could not reveal this because, as an intelligence committee member, he was sworn to secrecy. This revelation prompted an online attack ad against Durbin by the National Republican Senatorial Committee.

==== Israel-Palestine ====
In his 1982 campaign, Durbin benefited from donations by pro-Israel groups, especially AIPAC, that opposed Paul Findley's advocacy on behalf of the Palestine Liberation Organization in the year before the election.

In 2019, Durbin co-signed a Senate resolution affirming support for a two-state solution and opposition to a proposed Israeli annexation of the West Bank. In November 2023, he was the first U.S. senator to call for a ceasefire in the Gaza war.

In January 2024, Durbin voted against a resolution proposed by Senator Bernie Sanders to apply the human rights provisions of the Foreign Assistance Act to U.S. aid to Israel's military. The proposal was defeated, 72 to 11. In March 2024, Durbin urged the Biden administration to recognize a "nonmilitarized" Palestinian state after the end of the war in Gaza. In April 2025, Durbin voted for a pair of resolutions Sanders proposed to cancel the Trump administration's sales of $8.8 billion in bombs and other munitions to Israel. The proposals were defeated, 82 to 15.

==== Russia ====
Durbin spearheaded a nonbinding resolution in July 2018 "warning President Trump not to let the Russian government question diplomats and other officials". The resolution states the U.S. "should refuse to make available any current or former diplomat, civil servant, political appointee, law enforcement official or member of the Armed Forces of the United States for questioning by the government of Vladimir Putin". The resolution passed by a vote of 98–0.

In December 2018, after U.S. Secretary of State Mike Pompeo announced the Trump administration was suspending its obligations in the Intermediate-Range Nuclear Forces Treaty in 60 days if Russia continued to violate the treaty, Durbin was one of 26 senators to sign a letter expressing concern over the administration "now abandoning generations of bipartisan U.S. leadership around the paired goals of reducing the global role and number of nuclear weapons and ensuring strategic stability with America's nuclear-armed adversaries" and calling on Trump to continue arms negotiations.

==== Saudi Arabia ====
In March 2019, Durbin was one of 10 Democratic senators to sign a letter to Salman of Saudi Arabia requesting the release of human rights lawyer Waleed Abu al-Khair and writer Raif Badawi, women's rights activists Loujain al-Hathloul and Samar Badawi, and Dr. Walid Fitaih. The senators wrote, "Not only have reputable international organizations detailed the arbitrary detention of peaceful activists and dissidents without trial for long periods, but the systematic discrimination against women, religious minorities and mistreatment of migrant workers and others has also been well-documented."

==== Military deployment in US cities ====
In September 2025, Durbin called on the Senate Judiciary Committee to hold a hearing on President Trump's statement regarding the use of the US military in cities like Chicago. In a letter to the Chairman of the Judiciary Committee, Durbin wrote that military personnel are trained primarily for war, not community policing or safeguarding civil liberties. He alleged that such use of military personnel was unlawful and would endanger American communities.

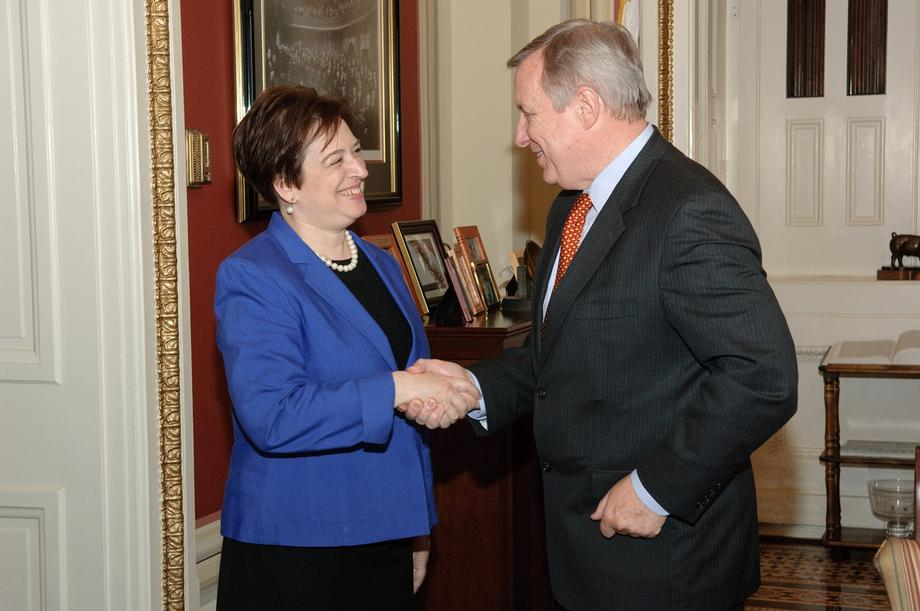
Durbin meets with Elena Kagan.

=== 2025 government shutdown ===
In November 2025, Durbin was one of eight Democratic senators to vote with Republicans to advance a continuing resolution that would reopen the federal government after a 41-day shutdown. He said the measure, though "not perfect", took "important steps to reduce this shutdown's hurt", citing the impact on federal workers, food-aid programs (including SNAP) and air-travel delays. In his floor speech, he said he could not support a strategy that "wages political battles at the expense of … neighbors' paychecks or food for their children". His vote was criticized by other Illinois and national Democrats who opposed ending funding without including extensions of tax credits under the Affordable Care Act, arguing the deal surrendered key leverage.

=== Other positions ===
In October 2007, Durbin opposed a bill in the Illinois General Assembly that would allow three casinos to be built, saying, "I really, really think we ought to stop and catch our breath and say, 'Is this the future of Illinois? That every time we want to do something we'll just build more casinos?'"

In August 2013, Durbin was among 23 Democratic senators to sign a letter to the Defense Department warning of some payday lenders "offering predatory loan products to service members at exorbitant triple-digit effective interest rates and loan products that do not include the additional protections envisioned by the law" and asserting that service members and their families "deserve the strongest possible protections and swift action to ensure that all forms of credit offered to members of our armed forces are safe and sound."

In March 2018, Durbin was among 10 senators to sign a letter spearheaded by Jeff Merkley lambasting a proposal by FCC Chairman Ajit Pai that would curb the scope of benefits from the Lifeline program during a period when roughly 6.5 million people in poor communities relied on Lifeline to receive access to high-speed internet, arguing that it was Pai's "obligation to the American public, as the Chairman of the Federal Communications Commission, to improve the Lifeline program and ensure that more Americans can afford access, and have means of access, to broadband and phone service." The senators also advocated insuring that "Lifeline reaches more Americans in need of access to communication services."

In April 2019, Durbin was among 34 senators to sign a letter to Trump encouraging him "to listen to members of your own Administration and reverse a decision that will damage our national security and aggravate conditions inside Central America", asserting that Trump had "consistently expressed a flawed understanding of U.S. foreign assistance" since becoming president and that he was "personally undermining efforts to promote U.S. national security and economic prosperity" by preventing the use of Fiscal Year 2018 national security funding. The senators argued that foreign assistance to Central American countries created less migration to the U.S. by helping to improve conditions in those countries.

In April 2019, Durbin was among six senators to send CFPB director Kathy Kraninger a letter expressing concern that "CFPB leadership has abandoned its supervision and enforcement activities related to federal student loan servicers" and opining that such behavior displayed "a shocking disregard for the financial well-being of our nation's public servants, including teachers, first responders, and members of the military." The senators requested that Kraninger clarify the CFPB's role in overseeing the Public Service Loan Forgiveness's student loan servicers handling since December 2017, such as examinations.

In April 2019, Durbin was among 41 senators to sign a bipartisan letter to the housing subcommittee praising the United States Department of Housing and Urban Development's Section 4 Capacity Building program as authorizing "HUD to partner with national nonprofit community development organizations to provide education, training, and financial support to local community development corporations (CDCs) across the country" and expressing disappointment that Trump's budget "has slated this program for elimination after decades of successful economic and community development." The senators wrote of their hope that the subcommittee would support continued funding for Section 4 in Fiscal Year 2020.

In June 2019, Durbin was among 15 senators to introduce the Affordable Medications Act, legislation intended to promote transparency by mandating that pharmaceutical companies disclose the amount of money going toward research and development in addition to both marketing and executives' salaries. The bill also abolished the restriction that stopped the federal Medicare program from using its buying power to negotiate lower drug prices for beneficiaries and hinder drug company monopoly practices used to keep prices high and disable less expensive generics entering the market.

In August 2019, Durbin, three other Senate Democrats, and Bernie Sanders signed a letter to Acting FDA Commissioner Ned Sharpless in response to Novartis falsifying data as part of an attempt to gain the FDA's approval for its new gene therapy Zolgensma, writing that it was "unconscionable that a drug company would provide manipulated data to federal regulators in order to rush its product to market, reap federal perks, and charge the highest amount in American history for its medication."

Durbin was participating in the 2021 United States Electoral College vote count when pro-Trump rioters attacked the U.S. Capitol. Along with other senators and staff, Durbin ran out of the Senate Chamber after the attackers, whom he called "extremists", breached the Capitol. He then evacuated to a secure location with Pelosi, McConnell and Schumer. Durbin blamed Trump for the attack. He also said Senator Josh Hawley was partially responsible for the attack. He called for Trump's removal through the invocation of the Twenty-fifth Amendment to the United States Constitution or impeachment.

In March 2025, Durbin voted with all Senate Republicans and nine Democrats to pass a continuing resolution, advancing the Trump administration's spending bill, angering many Democratic base constituents as well as House Democrats, who unanimously opposed the bill.

== Electoral history ==
1976 Illinois 50th Senate district - Primary Election (2-year term) (3/16/76)
Party	Candidate	Votes	%
Democratic	Dick Durbin	12,930	41.68
Democratic	Gary Tumulty	11,055	35.63
Democratic	Joseph Londrigan	7,036	22.68
Democratic	Write-Ins	3	0
Total votes		31,024	100.0

1976 Illinois's 50th Senate district election
Party	Candidate	Votes	%
Republican	John Davidson (incumbent)	48,760	50.86
Democratic	Dick Durbin	47,112	49.14
Total votes		95,872	100.0

1978 Illinois primary election - Lt. Governor (3/21/78)
Party	Candidate	Votes	%
Democratic	Dick Durbin (unopposed)	528,819	100
Democratic	Write-Ins	5	0
Total votes		528,824	100.0

1978 Illinois gubernatorial general election (11/7/78)
Party	Candidate	Votes	%
Republican	James R. Thompson (incumbent) David C. O'Neal (incumbent)	1,859,684	59.04
Democratic	Michael Bakalis Dick Durbin	1,263,134	40.10
Libertarian	Georgia Shields	11,420	0.36
Socialist Workers	Cecil Lampkin	11,026	0.35
U.S. Labor	Melvin Klenetsky	4,737	0.15
Write-in	Others	106	0.00
Total votes		3,150,107	

1982 Illinois's 20th congressional district election – Democratic primary
Party	Candidate	Votes	%
Democratic	Dick Durbin	33,956	75.33
Democratic	John L. Knuppel	11,119	24.67
Total votes		45,075	100.0

1982 Illinois's 20th congressional district election
Party	Candidate	Votes	%
Democratic	Dick Durbin	100,758	50.35
Republican	Paul Findley (incumbent)	99,348	49.65
Write-in votes	Write-in	3	0.00
Total votes		200,109	100.0

1984 Illinois's 20th congressional district election – Democratic primary
Party	Candidate	Votes	%
Democratic	Dick Durbin (incumbent)	53,588	92.47
Democratic	Louis K. Widmar	4,363	7.53
Total votes		57,951	100.0

1984 Illinois's 20th congressional district election
Party	Candidate	Votes	%
Democratic	Dick Durbin (incumbent)	145,092	61.23
Republican	Richard G. Austin	91,728	38.73
N/A	Other	1	0.00
Total votes		236,821	100.0

1986 Illinois's 20th congressional district election
Party	Candidate	Votes	%
Democratic	Dick Durbin (incumbent)	126,556	68.10
Republican	Kevin B. McCarthy	59,291	31.90
Total votes		185,847	100.0

1988 Illinois's 20th congressional district election
Party	Candidate	Votes	%
Democratic	Dick Durbin (incumbent)	153,341	68.87
Republican	Paul E. Jurgens	69,303	31.13
Total votes		222,644	100.0

1990 Illinois's 20th congressional district election
Party	Candidate	Votes	%
Democratic	Dick Durbin (incumbent)	130,114	66.20
Republican	Paul Jurgens	66,433	33.80
Total votes		196,547	100.0

1992 Illinois's 20th congressional district election
Party	Candidate	Votes	%
Democratic	Dick Durbin (incumbent)	154,869	56.50
Republican	John M. Shimkus	119,219	43.50
Total votes		274,088	100.0

1994 Illinois's 20th congressional district election – Democratic primary
Party	Candidate	Votes	%
Democratic	Dick Durbin (incumbent)	46,248	99.97
Democratic	Donald Wm. Owens (write-in)	14	0.03
Total votes		46,262	100.0

1994 Illinois's 20th congressional district election
Party	Candidate	Votes	%
Democratic	Dick Durbin (incumbent)	108,034	54.84
Republican	Bill Owens	88,964	45.16
Total votes		196,998	100.0

1996 United States Senate election in Illinois – Democratic primary
Party	Candidate	Votes	%
Democratic	Dick Durbin	512,520	64.87
Democratic	Pat Quinn	233,138	29.50
Democratic	Ronald F. Gibbs	17,681	2.23
Democratic	J. Ahmad	17,211	2.17
Democratic	Paul Park	9,505	1.20
Total votes		790,055	100.0

1996 United States Senate election in Illinois
Party	Candidate	Votes	%
Democratic	Dick Durbin	2,341,744	54.32
Republican	Al Salvi	1,728,824	40.10
Reform	Steven H. Perry	61,023	1.42
Libertarian	Robin J. Miller	41,218	0.96
Constitution	Chad Koppie	17,563	0.41
Natural Law	James E. Davis	13,838	0.32
Write-in votes	Write-in	4,228	0.10
Total votes		4,311,391	100.0

2002 United States Senate election in Illinois
Party	Candidate	Votes	%
Democratic	Dick Durbin (incumbent)	2,103,766	60.33
Republican	Jim Durkin	1,325,703	38.02
Libertarian	Steven Burgauer	57,382	1.65
Total votes		3,486,851	100.0

2008 United States Senate election in Illinois
Party	Candidate	Votes	%
Democratic	Dick Durbin (incumbent)	3,615,844	67.84
Republican	Steve Sauerberg	1,520,621	28.53
Green	Kathy Cummings	119,135	2.24
Libertarian	Larry A. Stafford	50,224	0.94
Constitution	Chad N. Koppie	24,059	0.45
Write-in votes	Patricia Elaine Beard	1	0.00
Total votes		5,329,884	100.0

2014 United States Senate election in Illinois
Party	Candidate	Votes	%
Democratic	Dick Durbin (incumbent)	1,929,637	53.55
Republican	Jim Oberweis	1,538,522	42.69
Libertarian	Sharon Hansen	135,316	3.76
Write-in votes	Roger K. Davis	31	0.00
Write-in votes	Hilaire F. Shioura	12	0.00
Write-in votes	Sherry Procarione	1	0.00
Total votes		3,603,519	100.0

2020 United States Senate election in Illinois
Party	Candidate	Votes	%
Democratic	Dick Durbin (incumbent)	3,278,930	54.93
Republican	Mark Curran	2,319,870	38.87
Willie Wilson Party	Willie Wilson	237,699	3.98
Libertarian	Danny Malouf	75,673	1.27
Green	David Black	55,711	0.95
Write-in		18	0.00
Total votes		5,968,901	100.0

== Personal life ==
=== Family and health ===
Durbin has been married to his wife Loretta (née Schaefer) since 1967. They have had three children: Christine, Jennifer, and Paul. After several weeks in the hospital with complications due to a congenital heart condition, Christine died on November 1, 2008, at age 40.

In June 2024, Durbin underwent a hip replacement surgery.

=== Conflict of interest issues ===
Durbin's wife was a lobbyist, and it was reported by the Chicago Tribune in 2014 that some of her "clients have received federal funding promoted by [Durbin]". In addition to announcing the award of monies to ten clients of his wife's lobbying firm, these conflicts included her lobbying firm receiving a one-year contract with a housing nonprofit group around the time Durbin went to bat for the organization; a state university receiving funds through an earmark by Durbin when his wife was its lobbyist; and Durbin arranging federal money for a public health nonprofit when his wife was seeking state support for the same group. The Durbins maintain that they try to avoid conflicts of interest.

=== Religion ===
Durbin is Catholic. In 2004, the Diocese of Springfield in Illinois barred him from receiving Communion because he voted against the Partial-Birth Abortion Ban Act. The current bishop of the diocese said Durbin stays away from his Springfield parish because "he doesn't want to make a scene". Durbin responded to the communion ban in 2004 that he is accountable to his constituents, even if it means defying Church teachings. In 2018, Bishop Thomas John Paprocki affirmed the decision to deny Durbin communion in the Springfield Diocese after Durbin's vote against the Pain-Capable Unborn Child Protection Act.

In 2017, Durbin was criticized for requesting a clarification from then Court of Appeals nominee Amy Coney Barrett during her Judiciary Committee confirmation hearing about her self-descriptive terminology "orthodox Catholic." He contended that such terminology might unfairly characterize Catholics who may not agree with the Church's positions about abortion or the death penalty. Barrett had written in an article that "litigants and the general public are entitled to impartial justice, and that may be something that a judge who is heedful of ecclesiastical pronouncements cannot dispense". Barrett also opined that judges are not bound by precedent conflicting with the Constitution. She wrote that judges could recuse themselves from hearing matters if their faith conflicted with issues to be decided in cases they might otherwise hear. Senator Dianne Feinstein said, "Senators must inquire about these issues when considering lifetime appointments because ensuring impartiality and fidelity to precedent are critical for the rule of law". The issue prompted questions regarding the application of Article VI, Section 3 of the Constitution, which mandates: "No religious test shall ever be required as a qualification to any office or public trust under the United States."

In 2025, the Archdiocese of Chicago announced it would honor Durbin with a lifetime achievement award for his advocacy of immigrant communities. After outcry from conservative Catholics, Durbin refused the award in view of the political climate.

== Filmography ==
=== Film appearances ===
Film
Year	Title	Role	Notes
2010	Pricele$$	Himself	Documentary
2015	The Gettysburg Address	Himself	Documentary
2022	Loan Wolves	Himself	Documentary

== See also ==
- Trump–Ukraine scandal

== Notes ==
Party political offices
Preceded by Neil Hartigan	Democratic nominee for Lieutenant Governor of Illinois; 1978	Succeeded by Grace Mary Stern
Preceded by Paul Simon	Democratic nominee for U.S. Senator from Illinois (Class 2); 1996, 2002, 2008, 2014, 2020	Succeeded by Juliana Stratton
Preceded by Harry Reid	Senate Democratic Whip; 2005–present	Incumbent
U.S. House of Representatives
Preceded by Paul Findley	Member of the U.S. House of Representatives from Illinois's 20th congressional district 1983–1997	Succeeded by John Shimkus
U.S. Senate
Preceded by Paul Simon	U.S. Senator (Class 2) from Illinois; 1997–present Served alongside: Carol Moseley Braun, Peter Fitzgerald, Barack Obama, Roland Burris, Mark Kirk, Tammy Duckworth	Incumbent
Preceded by Harry Reid	Senate Minority Whip; 2005–2007	Succeeded by Trent Lott
Preceded by Mitch McConnell	Senate Majority Whip; 2007–2015	Succeeded by John Cornyn
Preceded by John Cornyn	Senate Minority Whip; 2015–2021	Succeeded by John Thune
Preceded by Chuck Grassley	Chair of the Senate Judiciary Committee; 2021–2025	Succeeded by Chuck Grassley
Preceded by John Thune	Senate Majority Whip; 2021–2025	Succeeded by John Barrasso
Preceded by John Thune	Senate Minority Whip; 2025–present	Incumbent
Preceded by Lindsey Graham	Ranking Member of the Senate Judiciary Committee; 2025–present	Incumbent
U.S. order of precedence (ceremonial)
Preceded by John Barrasso as Senate Majority Whip	Order of precedence of the United States as Senate Minority Whip	Succeeded by Mitch McConnell as United States Senator
Preceded by Ron Wyden	United States senators by seniority 5th	Succeeded by Jack Reed
