= 2008 United States Senate election in Illinois =

- November 4, 2008
- Turnout: 68.42%

Nominee	Dick Durbin	Steve Sauerberg
Party	Democratic	Republican
Popular vote	3,615,844	1,520,621
Percentage	67.84%	28.53%
- County results Durbin: 40–50% 50–60% 60–70% 70–80% Sauerberg: 40–50% 50–60%
U.S. senator before election
Dick Durbin
Democratic
Elected U.S. Senator
Dick Durbin
Democratic

The 2008 United States Senate election in Illinois was held on November 4, 2008. Incumbent Democratic U.S. Senator Dick Durbin sought a third term in office and faced minimal opposition from Republican Steve Sauerberg. As expected, Durbin overwhelmingly won re-election. On the same night, fellow Democratic Senator Barack Obama was elected president of the United States, defeating Republican Senator John McCain of Arizona.

This was the last time a candidate received over 60% of the vote in a senate election in Illinois until the 2026 United States Senate election in Illinois.

== Background ==
The primaries and general elections coincided with those for other federal elections (president and House), as well as those for state offices.

For the primary elections, turnout was 32.37%, with 2,364,409 votes cast. For the general election, turnout was 68.42%, with 5,329,884 votes cast.

== Democratic primary ==
=== Candidates ===
- Dick Durbin, incumbent U.S. senator

=== Results ===
Democratic primary results
Party	Candidate	Votes	%
Democratic	Dick Durbin (incumbent)	1,653,833	100.00%
Total votes		1,653,833	100.00%

== Republican primary ==
=== Candidates ===
- Andy Martin, perennial candidate
- Mike Psak, trucker and perennial candidate
- Steve Sauerberg, physician

=== Results ===
Republican primary results
Party	Candidate	Votes	%
Republican	Steve Sauerberg	395,199	55.62%
Republican	Andy Martin	240,548	33.85%
Republican	Mike Psak	74,829	10.53%
Total votes		710,576	100.00%

== General election ==
=== Predictions ===
Source	Ranking	As of
The Cook Political Report	Safe D	October 23, 2008
CQ Politics	Safe D	October 31, 2008
Rothenberg Political Report	Safe D	November 2, 2008
Real Clear Politics	Safe D	November 4, 2008

=== Results ===
Durbin's 3,615,844 votes is the highest vote total in a statewide election in Illinois. No one has broken his record; however, then-Vice President Joe Biden received the most votes in the presidential election in Illinois in 2020.

Durbin comfortably won re-election with the best margin of his career, winning all but four of the state's 102 counties.

2008 United States Senate election in Illinois
Party	Candidate	Votes	%	±%
Democratic	Dick Durbin (incumbent)	3,615,844	67.84%	+7.51%
Republican	Steve Sauerberg	1,520,621	28.53%	−9.49%
Green	Kathy Cummings	119,135	2.24%	0.00%
Libertarian	Larry A. Stafford	50,224	0.94%	−0.70%
Constitution	Chad N. Koppie	24,059	0.45%	0.00%
Total votes		5,329,884	100.00%	N/A
Democratic hold				

==== Counties that flipped from Republican to Democratic ====
- Ogle (largest city: Rochelle)
- Jo Daviess (largest city: Galena)
- Carroll (largest city: Savanna)
- Stephenson (largest city: Freeport)
- Boone (largest city: Belvidere)
- DuPage (largest city: Aurora)
- Kane (largest city: Aurora)
- Kendall (largest village: Oswego)
- McHenry (largest city: Crystal Lake)
- Putnam (largest city: Hennpin)
- Ford (largest city: Paxton)
- Iroqouis (largest city: Watseka)
- Livingston (largest city: Pontiac)
- Washington (largest city: Nashville)
- Monroe (largest city: Waterloo)
- Effingham (largest city: Effingham)
- Wabash (largest city: Mount Carmel)
- Richland (largest city: Olney)
- Lawrence (largest city: Lawrenceville)
- Crawford (largest city: Robinson)
- Clark (largest city: Marshall)

== See also ==
- 2008 United States Senate elections
