= Early Treatment for HIV Act =

The Early Treatment for HIV Act (or ETHA) (S. 833 and H.R. 1616) is a bill introduced in the U.S. Senate.

The stated purpose of the bill is "to amend title XIX of the Social Security Act to permit States the option to provide Medicaid coverage for low-income individuals infected with HIV."

== Problems with Medicaid Coverage Before ETHA ==
Before the Early Treatment for HIV act, adults with asymptomatic HIV were ineligible to receive SSI income until they had developed AIDS. This is due to a person being unable to receive SSI payments unless they are classified as disabled. Many individuals were not able to receive medical care for their HIV because they did not quality for Medicaid, and their symptoms continued to progress without treatment.

ETHA (S. 860) would help adults with asymptomatic HIV receive treatment, which will slow the development of AIDS and lessen the severity of their symptoms. It would also result in a lower viral count for those treated, which means AIDS will be less likely to spread from that person to someone else.

== Previous Versions of the Bill ==
Congress	Short title	Bill number(s)	Date introduced	Sponsor(s)	# of cosponsors	Latest status
106th Congress	Early Treatment for HIV Act of 1999	H.R. 1591	April 28, 1999	Nancy Pelosi (D-CA)	73	Died in committee
106th Congress	Early Treatment for HIV Act of 1999	S. 902	April 28, 1999	Robert Torricelli (D-NJ)	5	Died in committee
107th Congress	Early Treatment for HIV Act of 2001	H.R. 2063	June 5, 2001	Nancy Pelosi (D-CA)	152	Died in committee
107th Congress	Early Treatment for HIV Act of 2001	S. 987	June 5, 2001	Robert Torricelli (D-NJ)	12	Died in committee
108th Congress	Early Treatment for HIV Act of 2004	H.R. 3859	February 26, 2004	Nancy Pelosi (D-CA)	156	Died in committee
108th Congress	Early Treatment for HIV Act of 2003	S. 847	April 9, 2003	Gordon H. Smith (R-OR)	33	Died in committee
109th Congress	Early Treatment for HIV Act of 2005	S. 311	February 8, 2005	Gordon H. Smith (R-OR)	38	Died in committee
110th Congress	Early Treatment for HIV Act of 2007	H.R. 3326	August 2, 2007	Eliot Engel (D-NY)	168	Died in committee
110th Congress	Early Treatment for HIV Act of 2007	S. 860	March 13, 2007	Gordon H. Smith (R-OR)	38	Died in committee
111th Congress	Early Treatment for HIV Act of 2009	H.R. 1616	March 19, 2009	Eliot Engel (D-NY)	187	Died in committee
111th Congress	Early Treatment for HIV Act of 2009	S. 833	April 20, 2009	Chuck Schumer (D-NY)	37	Died in committee
112th Congress	Early Treatment for HIV Act of 2012	H.R. 6006	June 21, 2012	Eliot Engel (D-NY)	1	Died in committee

In the 110th Congress, ETHA (S. 860 was introduced in the U.S. Senate on March 13, 2007. The bill was sponsored by Senators Gordon Smith (R-OR) with 38 cosponsors including Hillary Clinton (D-NY) and Bernie Sanders (I-VT).

Previous versions of the bill were introduced in the Republican-controlled 106th, 107th, 108th, and 109th Congresses. In each case, the bill never made it out of committee.
