= Lawrence Joseph Sarsfield Daly =

American politician (1912–1978)

Lawrence Joseph Sarsfield Daly (January 22, 1912 – April 17, 1978), usually known as Lar Daly, was an American fringe politician and novelty candidate from Chicago, Illinois who ran unsuccessfully for a variety of political offices between 1938 and 1978. He often campaigned wearing an Uncle Sam suit and typically campaigned in the Republican Party primary on a platform emphasizing American nationalism and moral issues.

His use of the equal-time rule in 1959 and 1960 made him the central figure in a case that influenced the relationship between mass media and American politics through the resulting amendments to the Communications Act of 1934 and the adoption of televised United States presidential debates.

== Biography ==
Lawrence Joseph Sarsfield Daly was born in Gary, Indiana on January 22, 1912 to Irish immigrants, moving to Chicago when he was six years old. From the ages of 8 to 24, he sold fruits and vegetables. He lived on the South Side of Chicago and owned a furniture store which primarily sold bar stools. For extra money, he worked as a singer in taverns, and he was known for his rich baritone singing and speaking voice.

In 1932, Daly ran his first ever political campaign and was successfully elected as a Republican ward committeeman. However, he was too young to accept the role and deemed ineligible. During his next campaign, for Cook County superintendent in 1938, he began shortening his name to "Lar," which he hoped would win votes from the county's Swedish population.

Over the next forty years, Daly ran several times for state and local office in Chicago. He ran on the ticket of whichever party he perceived to be stronger, including running at least one campaign (for mayor in 1959) in both the Democratic and Republican primaries. Beginning in 1954, he appeared at most campaign events wearing an Uncle Sam costume, though he later sold it because of "economic circumstances."

=== Political positions ===
Politically, Daly was once described as the "archconservative of all conservatives." His most forward position was his opposition to internationalism; he often billed himself on the ballot as Lar "America First" Daly. During his 1967 campaign, he promised that if elected, he would order that every drug trafficker be shot on sight. In 1968, he campaigned for president on a platform including the prompt obliteration of North Vietnam "with atomic bombs if necessary" and a system of bounties awarded to policemen for each drug trafficker they shot. The New York Times referred to him as athe only right-wing minor-party candidate in the race, as most similar candidates had deferred to bolster George Wallace.

He also displayed a tendency towards libertarianism, favoring the legalization of gambling, abolition of public education, and major reductions in taxes.

=== Unsuccessful campaigns for public office ===
Daly ran approximately 30 unsuccessful campaigns for public office. His unsuccessful campaigns for public office included candidacies in the following elections:

- 1938 Cook County superintendent of schools election (Democratic primary)
- 1942 United States Senate election in Illinois (Democratic primary)
- 1950 United States Senate election in Illinois (Republican primary)
- 1954 United States Senate election in Illinois (Republican primary)
- 1955 Chicago mayoral election (Republican primary)
- 1956 Illinois gubernatorial election (Republican primary)
- 1956 United States presidential election
- 1959 Chicago mayoral election (Democratic and Republican primaries)
- 1960 United States presidential election (Democratic primary and general election)
- 1962 United States Senate election in Illinois (Democratic primary)
- 1963 Chicago mayoral election (Republican primary)
- 1964 Illinois gubernatorial election (Republican primary)
- 1966 United States Senate election in Illinois (Republican primary)
- 1967 Chicago mayoral election (Republican primary and as write-in)
- 1968 United States presidential election (general election)
- 1969 Illinois's 13th congressional district special election (Republican primary)
- 1970 United States Senate special election in Illinois (Republican primary)
- 1973 Illinois's 7th congressional district special election (Republican primary and general election)
- 1974 United States Senate election in Illinois (Republican primary)
- 1978 United States Senate election in Illinois (Republican primary)

In 1973, Daly won his only primary for higher office, in the special election for Illinois's 7th congressional district. He ran unopposed in the Republican primary and lost the general election in a landslide. His final campaign came in 1978, when he polled 15 percent of the vote against incumbent United States senator Charles Percy. Daly died less than a month later, but his strong showing may have signaled Percy's unpopularity; he nearly lost the general election to political unknown Alex Seith.

In addition to his own campaigns for office, Daly also unsuccessfully filed the name of Douglas MacArthur as a candidate in every Republican presidential primary in Illinois for decades.

== Equal-time rule ==
Daly is best known for suing television and radio news stations under the federal Communications Act of 1934, specifically its equal-time rule requiring broadcasts to give him equal coverage with other, better known candidates, beginning with Chicago mayor Richard J. Daley during the 1959 mayoral election. In reaction to Daly's appearances and the FCC decision in his case, the United States Congress amended Section 315 of the Communications Act to exempt bona fide newscasts, news interviews, and documentaries from the equal-time rule. However, the amendment could not prevent Daly from making a particularly bizarre appearance on the national NBC broadcast of Tonight Starring Jack Paar during his 1960 presidential campaign, in which Daly received equal time with John F. Kennedy and Richard M. Nixon.

=== 1959 lawsuit and Communications Act amendment ===
In 1959, Daly was denied equal time by three Chicago television stations which had broadcast footage of Chicago mayor Richard J. Daley meeting President of Argentina Arturo Frondizi and launching a polio fund drive. Daly appealed his case to the Federal Communications Commission (FCC). Although Daly's own appeal for equal-time in the 1956 presidential campaign had been rejected and the FCC had recently rejected Michigan state senator Allen H. Blondy, who brought a similar case, on the grounds that the candidate was not responsible for initiating the broadcast and that it was "nothing more than a routine newscast by a station in the exercise of its judgment as to newsworthy events," it distinguished Daly's case on the grounds that the total exposure given to Daly's opponents in the mayoral election was seventeen minutes. On a petition for reconsideration, the FCC affirmed its opinion and referred to the equal-time rule as an "unequivocal mandate."

Reaction against the FCC decision was swift. Although most Chicago stations agreed to put Daly on the air, WBBM-TV (whose parent network, CBS, had been a longtime opponent of the equal-time rule) appealed the decision on the grounds that its coverage of the incumbent and Republican challenger Timothy P. Sheehan were legitimate news and equal-time for every candidate would make news a farce, dealing a blow to freedom of the press. President Dwight D. Eisenhower called the FCC decision "ridiculous" and instructed Attorney General William P. Rogers to find a solution, and the United States Congress began hearings on legislation to override the FCC decision. Although broadcasters pushed for a complete repeal of section 315 of the Communications Act, eliminating the equal-time rule entirely, the resulting compromise exempted bona fide newscasts, news interviews, news documentaries, and on-the-spot news coverage from section 315 of the Act, leaving broadcasters with journalist discretion to determine what was newsworthy. The amendment passed on September 14, 1959.

Daly's FCC case has been credited with inspiring the traditional formality of televised United States presidential debates, which began in 1960 and rely on the amended section 315 to exclude minor candidates.

=== Appearance on Tonight Starring Jack Paar ===
On June 16, 1960, Senator John F. Kennedy appeared as a guest on Tonight Starring Jack Paar while seeking the Democratic presidential nomination. Lar Daly had also declared himself a candidate for the Democratic nomination and subsequently filed a complaint with the Federal Communications Commission, arguing that Kennedy’s appearance entitled him to equal broadcast opportunities under Section 315 of the Communications Act.

The FCC ruled in Daly’s favor. The Commission determined that Daly was a legally qualified candidate for the Democratic presidential nomination and that Kennedy's appearance on Tonight Starring Jack Paar did not fall within the statutory exemption for a bona fide news interview.

Daly appeared on the program on July 7, 1960. He wore his customary Uncle Sam costume and a placard soliciting campaign contributions.

Contemporary coverage reported that he said, "You're faced with one choice. The issue now is national survival. Your only choice is America first-or death."

Daly also advocated for dropping an atomic bomb on China.

The studio audience booed him at several points during the appearance.

Paar criticized the FCC’s ruling and said that “This ruling by the FCC makes me ashamed, for the first time, to be a part of the entertainment industry.”

Daly was given approximately 25 minutes on the program. Because Kennedy’s earlier appearance had lasted about 47 minutes, Daly later filed another request with the FCC seeking an additional 22 minutes of airtime. The Commission denied that request.

== Personal life and death ==
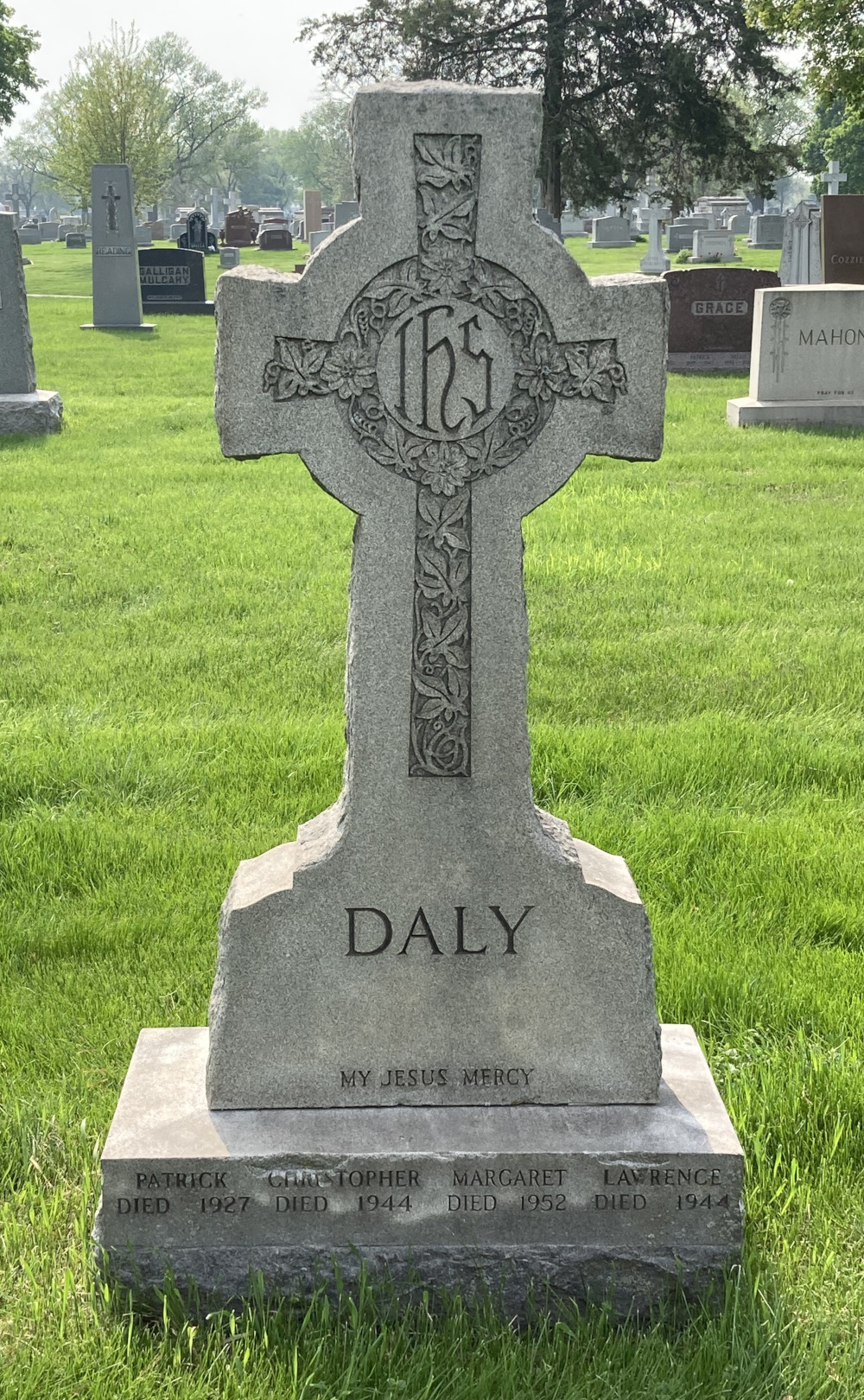
Daly's grave at Holy Sepulchre Cemetery

Daly was married to Alice Daly and had five children. He was considered well-liked and was known to play the fiddle or violin to entertain friends at parties.

=== Death and burial ===
Daly died of lung disease at Little Company of Mary Hospital in Evergreen Park, Illinois on April 17, 1978. He was buried at Holy Sepulchre Cemetery in Alsip.

Since his death, Daly's name has remained synonymous with perennial candidates. In 2001, when perennial presidential candidate Harold Stassen died, one Chicago commentator described him as "a big-time Lar Daly."

== See also ==
- Herbert H. Shaw, perennial candidate from Hudson County, New Jersey
