= 1960 United States presidential election in Illinois =

- November 8, 1960
- Turnout: 86.51%

Nominee	John F. Kennedy	Richard Nixon
Party	Democratic	Republican
Home state	Massachusetts	California
Running mate	Lyndon B. Johnson	Henry Cabot Lodge Jr.
Electoral vote	27	0
Popular vote	2,377,846	2,368,988
Percentage	49.98%	49.80%
County results
Kennedy
50–60%
60–70%
Nixon
40–50%
50–60%
60–70%
70–80%
President before election
Dwight D. Eisenhower
Republican
Elected President
John F. Kennedy
Democratic

The 1960 United States presidential election in Illinois took place on November 8, 1960, as part of the 1960 United States presidential election. State voters chose 27 representatives, or electors, to the Electoral College, who voted for president and vice president.

In the nation's second-closest race following Hawaii, Illinois was won by Senator John F. Kennedy (D–Massachusetts), running with Senator Lyndon B. Johnson, with 49.98% of the popular vote against incumbent Vice President Richard Nixon (R–California), running with former United States Ambassador to the United Nations Henry Cabot Lodge Jr., with 49.80% of the popular vote, a margin of victory of only 0.18%.

== Primaries ==
=== Turnout ===
Turnout in the state-run primary elections (Democratic and Republican) was 16.43% with a total of 836,458 votes cast.

Turnout during the general election was 86.51%, with 4,757,409 votes cast. Both major parties held non-binding state-run preferential primaries on April 12.

=== Democratic ===
1960 Illinois Democratic presidential primary
- April 12, 1960
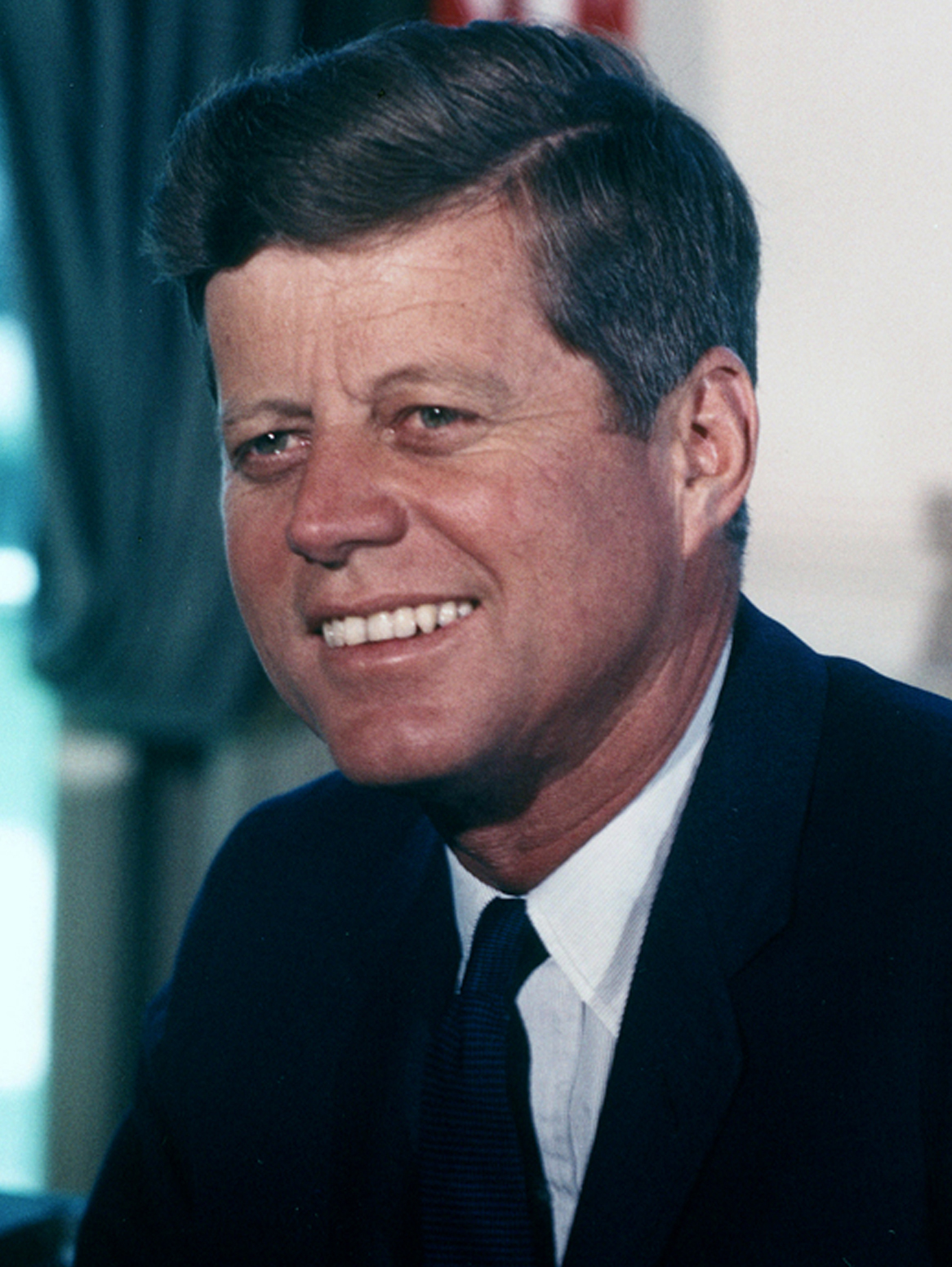

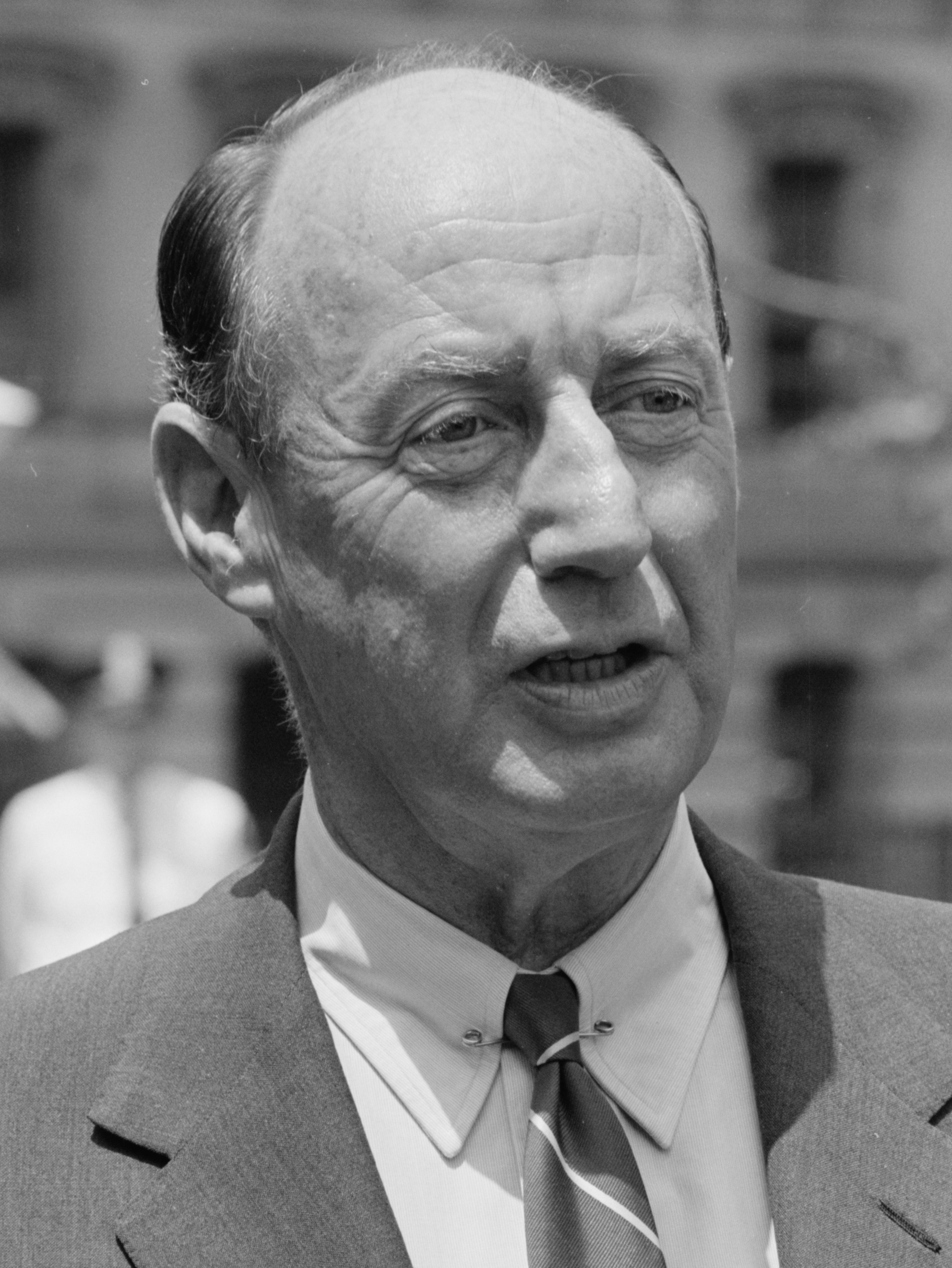

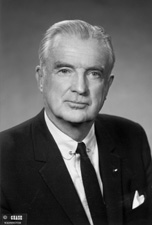

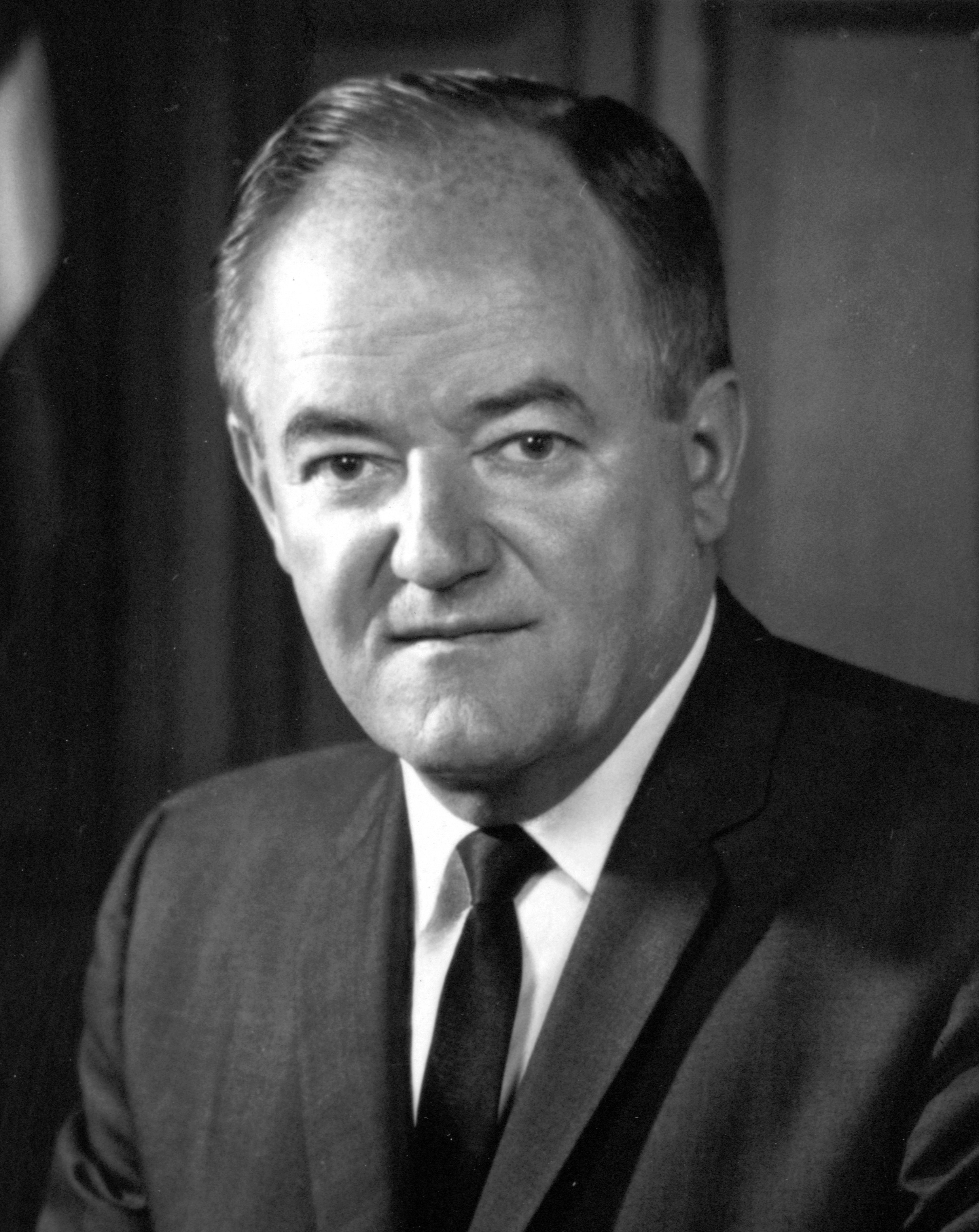
Candidate	John F. Kennedy	Adlai Stevenson II	Stuart Symington
Home state	Massachusetts	Illinois	Missouri
Popular vote	34,332	8,029	5,744
Percentage	64.57%	15.10%	10.80%
Candidate	Hubert Humphrey
Home state	Minnesota
Popular vote	4,283
Percentage	8.06%

The 1960 Illinois Democratic presidential primary was held on April 12, 1960, in the U.S. state of Illinois as one of the Democratic Party's state primaries ahead of the 1960 presidential election.

The popular vote was a non-binding "beauty contest". Delegates were instead elected by direct votes by congressional district on delegate candidates.

All candidates were write-ins. Kennedy ran a write-in campaign, and no candidate actively ran against him in Illinois.

Not all of the vote-getters had been declared candidates. Johnson, Stevenson, and Symington had all sat out the primaries.

Chicago mayor Richard J. Daley, head of the Cook County Democratic Party, promised to deliver Kennedy the support of Cook County's delegates, so long as Kennedy won competitive primaries in other states.

1960 Illinois Democratic presidential primary
Candidate	Votes	Percentage
John F. Kennedy (write-in)	34,332	64.57%
Adlai Stevenson (write-in)	8,029	15.10%
Stuart Symington (write-in)	5,744	10.80%
Hubert Humphrey (write-in)	4,283	8.06%
Lyndon B. Johnson (write-in)	442	0.83%
Others	337	0.63%
Totals	53,167	100.00%

=== Republican ===
1960 Illinois Republican presidential primary
- April 12, 1960
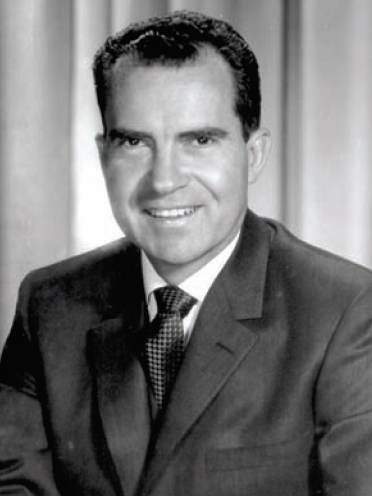
Candidate	Richard Nixon
Home state	California
Popular vote	782,849
Percentage	99.94%

The 1960 Illinois Republican presidential primary was held on April 12, 1960, in the U.S. state of Illinois as one of the Republican Party's state primaries ahead of the 1960 presidential election.

The preference vote was a "beauty contest". Delegates were instead selected by direct-vote in each congressional district on delegate candidates.

Nixon ran unopposed in the primary.

1960 Illinois Republican presidential primary
Party	Candidate	Votes	Percentage
Republican	Richard Nixon	782,849	99.94%
Write-in	Others	442	0.1%
Totals		783,291	100.00%

== Results ==
1960 United States presidential election in Illinois
Party	Candidate	Votes	%
Democratic	John F. Kennedy	2,377,846	49.98%
Republican	Richard Nixon	2,368,988	49.80%
Socialist Labor	Eric Hass	10,560	0.22%
Write-in		15	0.00%
Total votes		4,757,409	100%

=== Results by county ===
County	John F. Kennedy Democratic		Richard Nixon Republican		Various candidates Other parties		Margin		Total votes cast
County	#	%	#	%	#	%	#	%	Total votes cast
Adams	14,827	44.22%	18,674	55.70%	28	0.08%	-3,847	-11.48%	33,529
Alexander	4,477	51.83%	4,143	47.96%	18	0.21%	334	3.87%	8,638
Bond	2,856	39.88%	4,297	60.00%	9	0.13%	-1,441	-20.12%	7,162
Boone	2,605	28.43%	6,552	71.51%	5	0.05%	-3,947	-43.08%	9,162
Brown	1,849	49.44%	1,889	50.51%	2	0.05%	-40	-1.07%	3,740
Bureau	7,786	38.15%	12,597	61.73%	24	0.12%	-4,811	-23.58%	20,407
Calhoun	1,608	49.22%	1,654	50.63%	5	0.15%	-46	-1.41%	3,267
Carroll	3,097	32.88%	6,282	66.70%	39	0.41%	-3,185	-33.82%	9,418
Cass	3,692	47.85%	4,015	52.04%	8	0.10%	-323	-4.19%	7,715
Champaign	17,115	37.66%	27,793	61.16%	533	1.17%	-10,678	-23.50%	45,441
Christian	10,207	52.38%	9,263	47.54%	15	0.08%	944	4.84%	19,485
Clark	3,949	42.59%	5,319	57.36%	5	0.05%	-1,370	-14.77%	9,273
Clay	3,394	39.75%	5,134	60.13%	10	0.12%	-1,740	-20.38%	8,538
Clinton	6,188	51.99%	5,709	47.96%	6	0.05%	479	4.03%	11,903
Coles	8,629	41.46%	12,166	58.45%	19	0.09%	-3,537	-16.99%	20,814
Cook	1,378,343	56.37%	1,059,607	43.33%	7,319	0.30%	318,736	13.04%	2,445,269
Crawford	4,245	38.39%	6,809	61.58%	4	0.04%	-2,564	-23.19%	11,058
Cumberland	2,475	45.00%	3,020	54.91%	5	0.09%	-545	-9.91%	5,500
DeKalb	6,783	30.30%	15,586	69.62%	19	0.08%	-8,803	-39.32%	22,388
DeWitt	3,607	41.51%	5,074	58.40%	8	0.09%	-1,467	-16.89%	8,689
Douglas	3,532	37.98%	5,761	61.95%	6	0.06%	-2,229	-23.97%	9,299
DuPage	44,263	30.43%	101,014	69.45%	168	0.12%	-56,751	-39.02%	145,445
Edgar	5,024	40.59%	7,348	59.37%	4	0.03%	-2,324	-18.78%	12,376
Edwards	1,446	30.47%	3,291	69.36%	8	0.17%	-1,845	-38.89%	4,745
Effingham	5,676	46.94%	6,410	53.01%	6	0.05%	-734	-6.07%	12,092
Fayette	4,907	42.65%	6,586	57.25%	11	0.10%	-1,679	-14.60%	11,504
Ford	2,698	31.82%	5,779	68.16%	1	0.01%	-3,081	-36.34%	8,478
Franklin	11,368	48.86%	11,861	50.98%	37	0.16%	-493	-2.12%	23,266
Fulton	10,194	45.81%	11,999	53.93%	58	0.26%	-1,805	-8.12%	22,251
Gallatin	2,386	52.21%	2,179	47.68%	5	0.11%	207	4.53%	4,570
Greene	3,847	46.10%	4,487	53.78%	10	0.12%	-640	-7.68%	8,344
Grundy	4,276	38.08%	6,948	61.88%	4	0.04%	-2,672	-23.80%	11,228
Hamilton	2,639	40.89%	3,804	58.94%	11	0.17%	-1,165	-18.05%	6,454
Hancock	4,947	38.08%	8,036	61.86%	7	0.05%	-3,089	-23.78%	12,990
Hardin	1,465	42.92%	1,944	56.96%	4	0.12%	-479	-14.04%	3,413
Henderson	1,697	39.71%	2,572	60.19%	4	0.09%	-875	-20.48%	4,273
Henry	10,372	42.01%	14,297	57.91%	21	0.09%	-3,925	-15.90%	24,690
Iroquois	5,821	33.82%	11,376	66.09%	16	0.09%	-5,555	-32.27%	17,213
Jackson	8,527	44.62%	10,568	55.30%	17	0.09%	-2,041	-10.68%	19,112
Jasper	3,027	47.14%	3,393	52.84%	1	0.02%	-366	-5.70%	6,421
Jefferson	7,784	44.16%	9,841	55.84%	0	0.00%	-2,057	-11.68%	17,625
Jersey	4,087	48.99%	4,247	50.90%	9	0.11%	-160	-1.91%	8,343
Jo Daviess	4,293	41.21%	6,111	58.66%	13	0.12%	-1,818	-17.45%	10,417
Johnson	1,413	33.67%	2,778	66.19%	6	0.14%	-1,365	-32.52%	4,197
Kane	31,279	36.05%	55,389	63.84%	93	0.11%	-24,110	-27.79%	86,761
Kankakee	17,115	45.70%	20,311	54.23%	26	0.07%	-3,196	-8.53%	37,452
Kendall	2,242	27.25%	5,975	72.62%	11	0.13%	-3,733	-45.37%	8,228
Knox	11,889	39.83%	17,938	60.09%	23	0.08%	-6,049	-20.26%	29,850
Lake	46,941	40.85%	67,809	59.02%	149	0.13%	-20,868	-18.17%	114,899
LaSalle	27,532	49.94%	27,552	49.98%	41	0.07%	-20	-0.04%	55,125
Lawrence	3,667	37.42%	6,120	62.45%	13	0.13%	-2,453	-25.03%	9,800
Lee	5,896	35.22%	10,835	64.73%	8	0.05%	-4,939	-29.51%	16,739
Livingston	6,642	33.57%	13,139	66.42%	2	0.01%	-6,497	-32.85%	19,783
Logan	5,691	37.71%	9,383	62.18%	16	0.11%	-3,692	-24.47%	15,090
Macon	26,029	48.85%	27,151	50.95%	108	0.20%	-1,122	-2.10%	53,288
Macoupin	13,120	52.70%	11,731	47.12%	45	0.18%	1,389	5.58%	24,896
Madison	54,787	55.96%	42,984	43.90%	133	0.14%	11,803	12.06%	97,904
Marion	9,116	45.02%	11,121	54.92%	13	0.06%	-2,005	-9.90%	20,250
Marshall	2,981	41.76%	4,150	58.14%	7	0.10%	-1,169	-16.38%	7,138
Mason	3,824	46.75%	4,337	53.02%	19	0.23%	-513	-6.27%	8,180
Massac	2,644	36.87%	4,521	63.05%	6	0.08%	-1,877	-26.18%	7,171
McDonough	4,520	32.53%	9,363	67.39%	10	0.07%	-4,843	-34.86%	13,893
McHenry	12,659	32.87%	25,787	66.97%	62	0.16%	-13,128	-34.10%	38,508
McLean	13,971	36.04%	24,758	63.87%	32	0.08%	-10,787	-27.83%	38,761
Menard	2,068	39.82%	3,120	60.08%	5	0.10%	-1,052	-20.26%	5,193
Mercer	3,476	38.36%	5,582	61.60%	3	0.03%	-2,106	-23.24%	9,061
Monroe	3,398	41.78%	4,731	58.17%	4	0.05%	-1,333	-16.39%	8,133
Montgomery	8,815	48.95%	9,178	50.97%	14	0.08%	-363	-2.02%	18,007
Morgan	7,259	42.54%	9,791	57.38%	12	0.07%	-2,532	-14.84%	17,062
Moultrie	3,079	45.07%	3,752	54.93%	0	0.00%	-673	-9.86%	6,831
Ogle	4,792	26.59%	13,226	73.38%	7	0.04%	-8,434	-46.79%	18,025
Peoria	39,061	46.13%	45,529	53.77%	86	0.10%	-6,468	-7.64%	84,676
Perry	4,958	42.48%	6,708	57.47%	6	0.05%	-1,750	-14.99%	11,672
Piatt	2,889	39.05%	4,506	60.90%	4	0.05%	-1,617	-21.85%	7,399
Pike	5,461	47.75%	5,965	52.16%	10	0.09%	-504	-4.41%	11,436
Pope	971	36.44%	1,689	63.38%	5	0.19%	-718	-26.94%	2,665
Pulaski	2,322	46.81%	2,621	52.83%	18	0.36%	-299	-6.02%	4,961
Putnam	1,160	44.29%	1,457	55.63%	2	0.08%	-297	-11.34%	2,619
Randolph	7,344	47.85%	7,988	52.05%	15	0.10%	-644	-4.20%	15,347
Richland	3,015	36.09%	5,329	63.80%	9	0.11%	-2,314	-27.71%	8,353
Rock Island	33,812	50.88%	32,534	48.96%	108	0.16%	1,278	1.92%	66,454
Saline	6,835	43.52%	8,853	56.36%	19	0.12%	-2,018	-12.84%	15,707
Sangamon	35,793	46.28%	41,483	53.64%	59	0.08%	-5,690	-7.36%	77,335
Schuyler	2,115	40.96%	3,047	59.00%	2	0.04%	-932	-18.04%	5,164
Scott	1,543	40.46%	2,267	59.44%	4	0.10%	-724	-18.98%	3,814
Shelby	5,720	45.39%	6,872	54.53%	11	0.09%	-1,152	-9.14%	12,603
St. Clair	67,367	61.38%	42,046	38.31%	338	0.31%	25,321	23.07%	109,751
Stark	1,383	32.06%	2,925	67.80%	6	0.14%	-1,542	-35.74%	4,314
Stephenson	8,055	36.62%	13,872	63.07%	68	0.31%	-5,817	-26.45%	21,995
Tazewell	20,521	46.09%	23,967	53.83%	38	0.09%	-3,446	-7.74%	44,526
Union	4,321	49.31%	4,432	50.58%	10	0.11%	-111	-1.27%	8,763
Vermilion	19,702	42.51%	26,571	57.34%	69	0.15%	-6,869	-14.83%	46,342
Wabash	3,013	41.40%	4,261	58.55%	4	0.05%	-1,248	-17.15%	7,278
Warren	3,835	34.66%	7,221	65.25%	10	0.09%	-3,386	-30.59%	11,066
Washington	3,093	37.92%	5,053	61.95%	11	0.13%	-1,960	-24.03%	8,157
Wayne	3,954	37.25%	6,652	62.67%	9	0.08%	-2,698	-25.42%	10,615
White	4,756	44.97%	5,810	54.93%	11	0.10%	-1,054	-9.96%	10,577
Whiteside	9,112	34.27%	17,434	65.56%	46	0.17%	-8,322	-31.29%	26,592
Will	41,056	49.04%	42,575	50.86%	81	0.10%	-1,519	-1.82%	83,712
Williamson	11,335	45.17%	13,732	54.72%	29	0.12%	-2,397	-9.55%	25,096
Winnebago	40,090	44.67%	49,541	55.20%	110	0.12%	-9,451	-10.53%	89,741
Woodford	4,401	35.18%	8,101	64.76%	7	0.06%	-3,700	-29.58%	12,509
Totals	2,377,846	49.98%	2,368,988	49.80%	10,575	0.22%	8,858	0.18%	4,757,409

==== Counties that flipped from Republican to Democratic ====
- Alexander
- Cook
- Christian
- Clinton
- Rock Island

==== Counties that flipped from Democratic to Republican ====
- Union

== Analysis ==
=== Alleged mafia intervention ===
Some journalists later argued that mobster Sam Giancana and his Chicago crime syndicate "played a role" in Kennedy's victory. Giancana's mistress Judith Exner and Frank Sinatra's daughter Tina Sinatra both stated that Giancana used his connections to persuade unions to support Kennedy. According to Exner, Giancana bragged to her that Kennedy would never have been elected without him. However, it is alleged that Giancana came to regret aiding Kennedy get elected due to the fact that attorney general Robert F. Kennedy made significant efforts to crack down on organized crime. The lawyer Robert J. McDonnell, later to become the son-in-law of Giancana, told journalist Seymour Hersh that at the request of judge William J. Tuohy he helped set up a meeting between Joseph P. Kennedy Sr. and Giancana. Sinatra's daughter Tina told Hersh a similar story, that through her father Kennedy set up a meeting with Giancana.

Frank Ragano, lawyer for Florida mob boss Santo Trafficante Jr., stated that Giancana complained to his client that "We broke our balls for him and gave him the election, and he gets his brother to hound us to death". In the book Double Cross by Chuck Giancana, the half-brother of Giancana claimed Giancana said “I help get Jack elected and, in return, he calls off the heat".

=== Alleged fraud ===
Some, including Republican legislators and journalists, believed that Kennedy benefited from vote fraud from Mayor Richard J. Daley's powerful Chicago political machine.

Daley's machine was known for "delivering whopping Democratic tallies by fair means and foul." Republicans tried and failed to overturn the results at the time—as well as in ten other states. Nixon's campaign staff urged him to pursue recounts and challenge the validity of Kennedy's victory, but Nixon gave a speech three days after the election that he would not contest the election.

A myth arose that Daley held back much of the Chicago vote until the late morning hours of November 9. However, when the Republican Chicago Tribune went to press, 79% of Cook County precincts had reported, compared to just 62% of Illinois's precincts overall. Moreover, Nixon never led in Illinois, and Kennedy's lead merely shrank as election night went on. Earl Mazo, a reporter for the pro-Nixon New York Herald Tribune and his biographer, investigated the voting in Chicago and "claimed to have discovered sufficient evidence of vote fraud to prove that the state was stolen for Kennedy."

A special prosecutor assigned to the case brought charges against 650 people, who were acquitted by a judge who was considered a "Daley machine loyalist." Three Chicago election workers were convicted of voter fraud in 1962 and served short terms in jail. Mazo, the Herald-Tribune reporter, later said that he "found names of the dead who had voted in Chicago, along with 56 people from one house." He found cases of Republican voter fraud in southern Illinois but said that the totals "did not match the Chicago fraud he found."

An academic study in 1985 later analyzed the ballots of two disputed precincts in Chicago which were subject to a recount. It found that while there was a pattern of miscounting votes to the advantage of Democratic candidates, Nixon suffered less than Republicans in other races, and the extrapolated error would have reduced his Illinois margin only from 8,858 votes, the final official total, to just under 8,000. It concluded there was insufficient evidence that he had been cheated out of winning Illinois.

Even if enough legitimate systemic fraud was discovered in Illinois to give Nixon the state, that alone would not have been enough to win him the presidency. Kennedy would've still been left with 276 electoral votes, seven more than what he needed to win the White House.

=== Recount ===
Ben Adamowski, a Republican who lost reelection as Cook County State's Attorney to Democratic nominee Daniel P. Ward, requested a recount of the state's attorney race. Republicans sought to use this recount, as they could not order a recount of the presidential results, to prove that fraud had been committed in the presidential election. Sidney Holzman, the chair of the Board of Election Commissioners, stated that only the three BEC members could handle the ballots and would only recount the ballots for the state's attorney election. Judge Thaddeus Adesko ruled that twenty-five teams of counters had to be used and that the other elections would be included in the recount.

The recount was finished on December 9, and showed that in six towns around Chicago, mistakes of ten votes or more in favor of Kennedy occurred in 3.1% of the precincts, those in favor of Nixon occurred in 2.6%, and those in favor of third-parties occurred in 4.8%. 11% of the precincts in Chicago had errors of ten votes or more in Kennedy's favor and 8.6% in Nixon's favor. Kennedy's vote was overcounted in 38% of Chicago's precincts while Nixon's vote was overcounted in 40%. Nixon's total was increased by 926 votes.

Republicans accused the election commission of manipulating the recount and Adamowski successfully sued for another recount in 1961, although only his election was recounted. The original recount increased his vote total by 9,073 while the second one increased his total by 12,694 per precinct.

== See also ==
- United States presidential elections in Illinois

== Works cited ==
- Kallina, Edmund (1985). "Was the 1960 Presidential Election Stolen? The Case of Illinois". Presidential Studies Quarterly. 15 (1). Wiley-Blackwell: 113–118. JSTOR 27550168.
