= 1963 Chicago mayoral election =

- April 2, 1963
- Turnout: 69.6% ▲12.5 pp
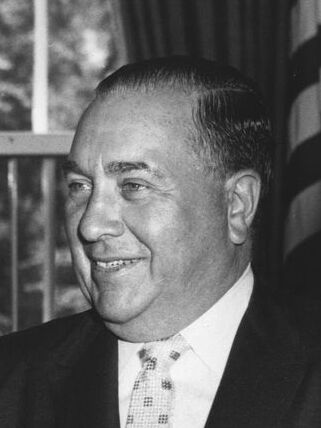

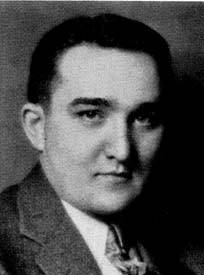
Nominee	Richard J. Daley	Ben Adamowski
Party	Democratic	Republican
Popular vote	679,497	540,705
Percentage	55.69%	44.31%
Mayor before election
Richard J. Daley
Democratic
Elected Mayor
Richard J. Daley
Democratic

The Chicago mayoral election of 1963 was held on April 2, 1963. The election saw Richard J. Daley elected to a third term as mayor, defeating Republican Ben Adamowski by a double-digit margin.

The party was preceded by primary elections held on February 26, 1963 to determine the nominees of both the Democratic Party and the Republican Party. Daley was unopposed in the Democratic primary and former Cook County State's Attorney Adamowski faced only weak opposition in the Republican primary.

== Background ==
Daley as mayor, oversaw a revitalization of the city's downtown. However, there were negative signs for his prospects of reelection. While Democrats had swept all but one of the major Cook County offices up for election in 1962, the party's candidate's margins of victory in many of these races had a vast decrease over their margins-of-victory in the previous 1958 elections for the same offices. This was seen as evidence of a lack of Democratic Party support. Additionally, in 1962, six bond issues which were strongly supported by Daley, had all been defeated by voters by margins of nearly 3–2 in referendums.

Despite these concerns, even before he announced his reelection effort, Daley was already receiving major endorsements. Chicago's business community strongly stood behind him, and was pushing him to run for another term. Advertising executive Fairfax Mastick Cone announced that he would organize the Non-Partisan Committee to Re-Elect Mayor Daley.

Within days of this, a large number of business leaders had publicly declared their support for Daley. Additionally, organized labor continued to support the mayor. On December 4, 1962, the Chicago Federation of Labor president William Lee announced the organization's endorsement of Daley's reelection.

While influential endorsements for his prospective reelection had piled up, Daley remained initially noncommittal over whether he'd run, remarking, "running for a third term is something you don't make your mind up about overnight". However, he would soon announce to a meeting of Democratic ward committeemen on December 14, 1962, that he planned to run for reelection, and received their unanimous support.

Days before Daley was to publicly announce his reelection effort, allegations related to Democratic machine connections to crime syndicates arose, tainting Daley's image. To project strength, on January 2, when Daley formally filed his candidacy, he submitted nominating petitions greatly exceeding the requisite signature requirement, with 750,000 signatures.

== Primaries ==
Primary elections were held on February 26, 1963. 48.31% of registered voters participated in the primary elections.

=== Democratic primary ===
Incumbent mayor Richard J. Daley was unopposed in the Democratic primary.

=== Republican primary ===
Cook County State's Attorney Adamowski won the Republican primary in a landslide. Adamowski had formerly been a Democrat until 1955, the same year in which he had lost the 1955 Democratic mayoral primary. Adamowski was considered to be smart and articulate. He had previously carried Chicago's vote when he was elected Cook County State's Attorney in 1956, and his 1960 reelection loss had been a narrow one (which he alleged was due to vote theft committed by the Democratic machine).

1963 Chicago Republican mayoral primary
Party	Candidate	Votes	%
Republican	Ben Adamowski	174,742	90.54
Republican	Howard J. Doyle	9,522	4.93
Republican	Lawrence "Lar" Daly	8,746	4.53
Turnout		193,010	

== General election ==
Adamowski sought to receive the backing of the city's sizable Polish-American electorate. He had a strong backing among this electorate. Adamowski ran a vigorous campaign.

Adamowski portrayed Daley as a heavy-taxing liberal. He criticized Daley for what he alleged were government waste and high taxes. He accused Daley of doing too much for the city's impoverished, particularly its expanding black population. Adamowski dismissed Daley's assertions that city services had improved during his tenure. Adamowski was particularly critical of the fire department under Daley's tenure. He even placed blame for the Our Lady of the Angels School fire with Daley's fire department. Adamowski criticized Daley for being a powerful political boss, declaring, "we do not have one party-rule, we have one-man rule."

Daley painted a positive picture of the city of Chicago. He put focus on the work he had done to redevelop Chicago and improve city services. He argued that his police department reform had already resulted in the reduction of crime rates. He also boasted of awards won in 1959 and 1961 naming Chicago the "cleanest big city" in the United States. He also boasted that the National Clean-Up, Paint-Up, Fix-Up Bureau had just declared Chicago the "cleanest large city" for 1962 as well. Daley positioned himself to be the candidate of both business and labor unions. Adamowski sought to paint himself as the "people's candidate", saying,

I hear State Street is against me, the bankers are against me, and the labor leaders are against me. State Street doesn't make Chicago big, it's the other way around. I'll take Western Avenue, Nagle Avenue, Ashland Avenue, and Milwaukee Avenue, where the little people reside. I'll take the bank depositors over the bankers any day. That goes for the little people in labor, too.

The heated issue was "open housing", which referred to the issue of racial integration in Chicago's housing. Daley attempted to skirt the issue, while Adamowski was vocal and clear in his opposition, stating, "I am opposed to so-called open occupancy legislation, because like patriotism, it cannot be legislated. I would oppose it because it creates tense situations and can't be enforced."

Adamowski criticized Daley over aspects of construction undertaken at O'Hare Airport. Firms involved in the construction of the airport had hired Daley-ally and Democratic machine operative Thomas E. Keane, and Adamowski alleged that the airport was being run as, "a private concession for Tom Keane."

Daley benefited from positive media attention. Chicago's newspapers provided Daley largely positive coverage, assessing his mayoralty very positively. Shortly ahead of the election, Daley graced the cover of the March 15 edition of the magazine Time.

The cover story, entitled "Clouter with a Conscience", featured photos of new Chicago skyscrapers, O'Hare Airport, and a photo of Daley with President John F. Kennedy. The article gave Daley credit for transforming the city, and awarding it "new stature". The article's mere mention of Adamowski labeled him a former state's attorney who, "distinguished himself by never successfully prosecuting a major campaign".

To put Daley in a bind, Republicans introduced a bill in the state legislature that would place a tax ceiling on the general expenditure fund of Chicago. This meant that Daley, strongly opposed to such a measure, would need to again publicly oppose a measure similar to ones he had successfully helped fight in 1957, 1959, and 1961. This, Republicans hoped, would lead voters to associate Daley with high taxes.

Seeking to place a spotlight on his work at O'Hare Airport days before the election to mark the opening of the airport's circular restaurant, Daley arranged to have an opening ceremony for the restaurant which would also have President Kennedy in attendance.

The presidential visit also featured a motorcade along the seventeen-mile route between the airport and Conrad Hilton Hotel, where Daley hosted a "civic luncheon". In the ceremony at the airport, Kennedy praised the airport and mayor, declaring that the airport "could be classed as one of the wonders of the modern world" and was, "a tribute to Mayor Daley who kept these interests and resources together, working together, until the job was done".

=== Result ===
Daley saw overwhelming support in predominantly African American wards on the city's south and west sides. Adamowski defeated Daley in ethnically white wards by a three to one margin. Daley only won due to his overwhelming support from the city's black voters. Over half of Daley's vote came from black voters. Daley received 81% of the black vote, but only 49% of the white vote. The severity of Daley's decline in support among white voters, however, was partly aided by Adamowski's strong support among his fellow Poles.

1963 Chicago mayoral general election
Party	Candidate	Votes	%
Democratic	Richard J. Daley (incumbent)	679,497	55.69
Republican	Ben Adamowski	540,705	44.31
Turnout		1,220,202	
