= William Thomas Hart =

American judge (1929–2023)

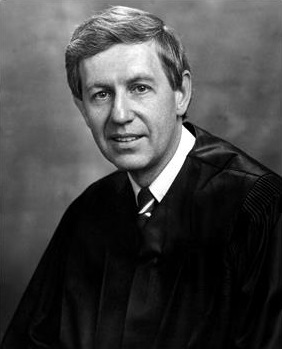

Senior Judge of the United States District Court for the Northern District of Illinois
- In office June 1, 1996 – January 17, 2023

Judge of the United States District Court for the Northern District of Illinois
- In office April 21, 1982 – June 1, 1996
- Appointed by: Ronald Reagan
- Preceded by: John Powers Crowley
- Succeeded by: Rebecca R. Pallmeyer

Personal details
- Born: February 4, 1929 Joliet, Illinois, U.S.
- Died: January 17, 2023 (aged 93) Chicago, Illinois, U.S.
- Education: Loyola University Chicago (JD)

Military service
- Allegiance: United States
- Branch/service: United States Army
- Years of service: 1951–1953

William Thomas Hart (February 4, 1929 – January 17, 2023) was a United States district judge of the United States District Court for the Northern District of Illinois.

== Education and career ==
Born in Joliet, Illinois, Hart received a Juris Doctor from Loyola University Chicago School of Law in 1951. He was in the United States Army from 1951 to 1953. He was an assistant United States attorney of the Northern District of Illinois from 1954 to 1956. He was in private practice in Chicago, Illinois from 1956 to 1982. He was a special assistant state attorney general of Illinois from 1957 to 1958. He was a special assistant state's attorney of Cook County, Illinois in 1960.

== Federal judicial service ==
Hart was nominated by President Ronald Reagan on March 11, 1982, to a seat on the United States District Court for the Northern District of Illinois vacated by Judge John Powers Crowley. He was confirmed by the United States Senate on April 20, 1982, and received his commission on April 21, 1982. He assumed senior status on June 1, 1996, a position he held until his death on January 17, 2023.

== Sources ==
- William Thomas Hart's obituary

Legal offices
Preceded by John Powers Crowley	Judge of the United States District Court for the Northern District of Illinois; 1982–1996	Succeeded by Rebecca R. Pallmeyer
