= 1959 Chicago mayoral election =

- April 7, 1959
- Turnout: 57.1% ▼7.1 pp

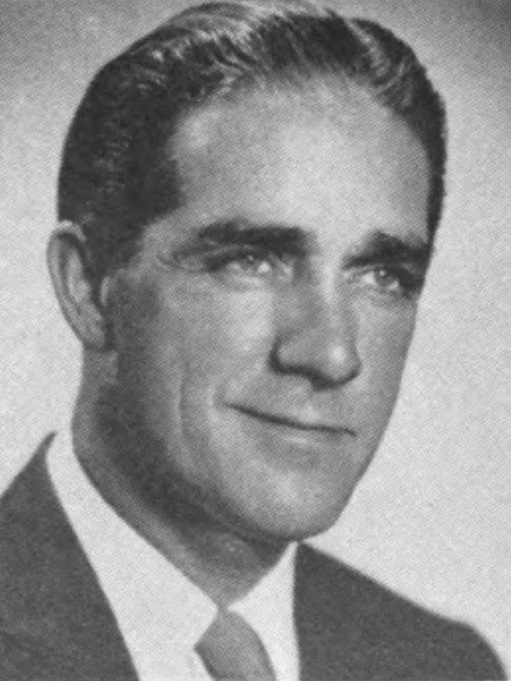
| Nominee | Richard J. Daley | Timothy P. Sheehan |
| Party | Democratic | Republican |
| Popular vote | 778,612 | 311,940 |
| Percentage | 71.4% | 28.6% |
Mayor before election
Richard J. Daley
Democratic
Elected Mayor
Richard J. Daley
Democratic

The Chicago mayoral election of 1959 was held on April 7, 1959. The election saw Richard J. Daley being elected to a second term as mayor by a landslide margin of more-than 40% over former U.S. congressman Timothy P. Sheehan.

In their respective party's primary elections, each held on February 24, 1959, both nominees had won their nominations easily, only facing minor competition from Lawrence "Lar" Daly, a perennial candidate who ran in both party's primaries.

== Background ==
Heading into the 1959 election, Daley had strong support as mayor across party lines. The Republican Party, however, insisted it stood a chance of winning the mayoral election, with governor William Stratton stating, "I can think of four or five good candidates," the party could run against Daley, but conceding, "whether they will run is another matter. By 1959, Chicago's black voters had strongly come to support the Democratic Party.

While they leaned very Republican and had opposed him in the 1955 election, the city's business community had come to support Daley by 1959. Part of there support was won through his focus on improving the city's business district. Particularly, the Development Plan for the Central Area of Chicago placed a strong emphasis on development in the Loop. Other support from the business community was won by his dedication to projects such as highways, parking lots, and the development of O'Hare Airport (O'Hare, which had opened for passenger service the year Daley had become mayor, saw developments during Daley's term that positioned it to become the city's major airport). Daley had also shown a willingness to do favors for businessmen, and bend rules for them, with one national commentator remarking, "Daley has made it easier to do business in Chicago than almost anywhere else in the country." The city's newspapers, which had largely been in opposition to Daley in 1955, had come around to supporting him by 1959, with the Chicago Sun-Times even declaring on the day that Daley launched his reelection campaign that, "Dick Daley has been one of the best mayors in Chicago's history".

== Primaries ==
44.15% of registered voters participated in the primary elections.

=== Democratic primary ===
Daley faced no serious opposition for his party's nomination. Daley launched his reelection campaign December 11, 1958 at the Morrison Hotel, before a crowd of greater than 1,000 loyalists of the Cook County Democratic Party. An hour after this, Chicago Federation of Labor president William Lee declared that Daley would receive the organization's endorsement for both the primary and general elections (before the Republicans even had a chance to name a challenger to Daley).

==== Results ====
Chicago Democratic mayoral primary (February 24, 1959)
| Party | Candidate | Votes | % |
|---|---|---|---|
| Democratic | Richard J. Daley (incumbent) | 471,674 | 91.65 |
| Democratic | Lawrence "Lar" Daly | 42,967 | 8.35 |
| Turnout | | 514,641 | |

=== Republican primary ===
Sheehan, a former Republican congressman, faced no serious competition in the Republican primary. He had been drafted by the party to run. Sheehan had recently lost reelection to Congress in 1958. Sheehan was a conservative Republican.

==== Results ====
Chicago Republican mayoral primary (February 24, 1959)
| Party | Candidate | Votes | % |
|---|---|---|---|
| Republican | Timothy P. Sheehan | 70,140 | 85.07 |
| Republican | Lawrence "Lar" Daly | 12,314 | 14.93 |
| Turnout | | 82,454 | |

== General election ==
While he was a Republican congressman, Sheehan had nevertheless earned the respect of many Democrats. This gave him the potential to possibly earn votes in the general election of an overwhelmingly Democratic city. However, he ultimately was handed a landslide defeat from Daley. Sheehan sought in his campaign to characterize Daley as the head of a corrupt power-hungry political machine. Sheehan rubbed-in that Paul Powell, a bitter political rival of Daley, had recently been elected Speaker of the Illinois House of Representatives, despite Daley's efforts to prevent this. Sheehan argued that crime and drugs were rampant on the South Side because they received protection from Daley and the Democratic machine, saying, "there seems to be a positive correlation and connection between those areas which have suffered a breakdown of law and order and the Democratic Party success". Sheehan also criticized Daley's plans for construction of public housing, arguing that his plans would result in "skyscraper slums".

Daley publicly spoke of the many civic improvements he had achieved in his term as mayor. Daley also focused a lot of effort on shoring up the turnout of Democratic machine voters. Sheehan's efforts to convince voters that Daley's administration was corrupt were to little avail. Daley was strongly backed by President of the Cook County Board of Commissioners Dan Ryan Jr. Daley, despite being a political boss, received strong support from a number of reform-minded Democrats. Daley saw support from former Illinois Governor and two-time Democratic presidential nominee Adlai Stevenson II, who at a Democratic rally held near the end of the campaign remarked in praise of Daley, "I dare say that seldom if ever have we been served by such a combination of politician and idealist, who by the arts of one could achieve the objectives of the other." He also received the backing of US Senator Paul Douglas, who in one speech supporting Daley called him, "the best mayor Chicago ever had".

Sheehan saw support from, among others, incumbent Governor William Stratton. However, Sheehan's supporters focused much of their stump speeches on deploring Daley, rather than extolling the virtues of Sheehan. Daley was able to adapt to the audiences he spoke before, portraying himself as an ally of the black community in speeches before black audiences, and adopting reformist rhetoric when speaking to anti-machine audiences. Reviving a tactic used in his previous campaign, a "Volunteers for Daley" committee was formed to generate support among reform Democrats.

=== Results ===
Daley carried 49 of the city's 50 wards. The sole ward he lost was the 41st Ward, located on the Far Northwest Side, which was Sheehan's home ward.

1959 Chicago mayoral general election
| Party | Candidate | Votes | % |
|---|---|---|---|
| Democratic | Richard J. Daley (incumbent) | 778,612 | 71.40 |
| Republican | Timothy P. Sheehan | 311,940 | 28.60 |
| Turnout | | 1,090,552 | |
