= 1956 Illinois gubernatorial election =

- November 6, 1956
- Turnout: 82.69% ▼0.57 pp
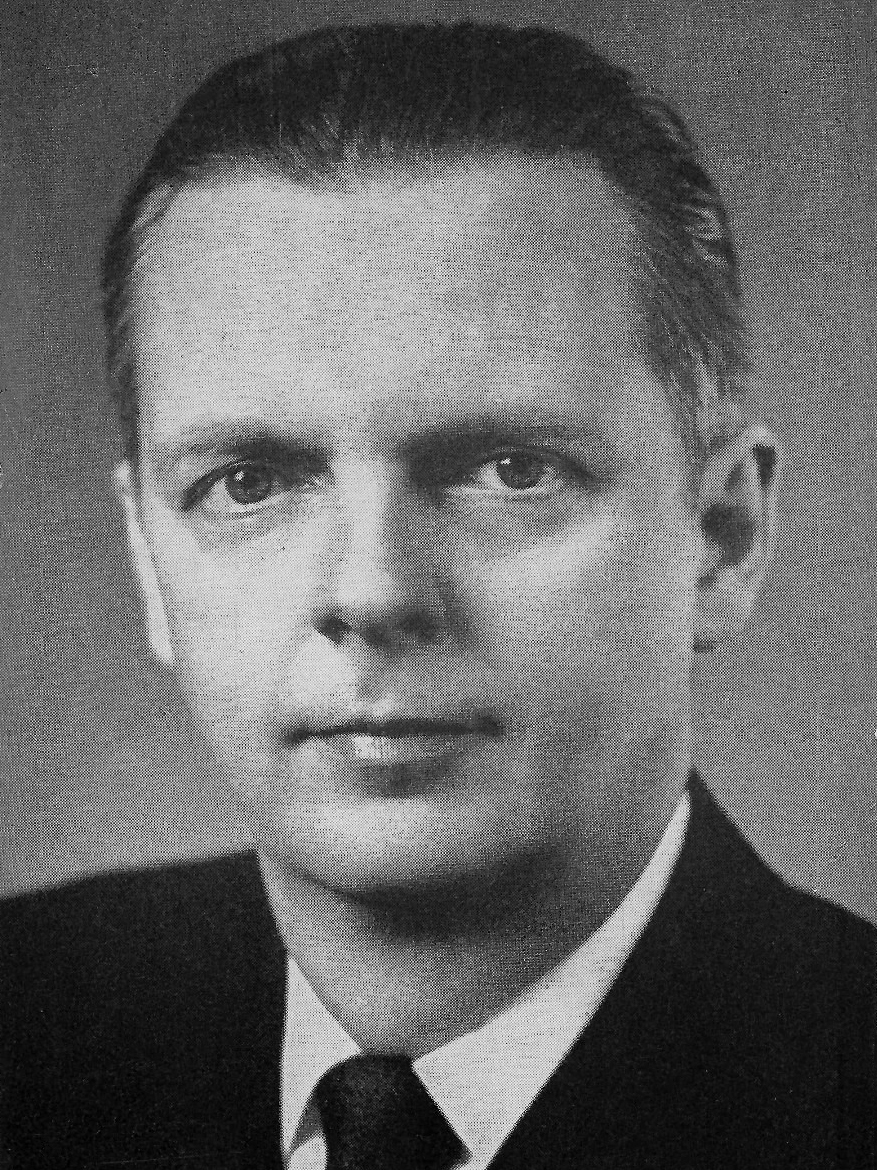

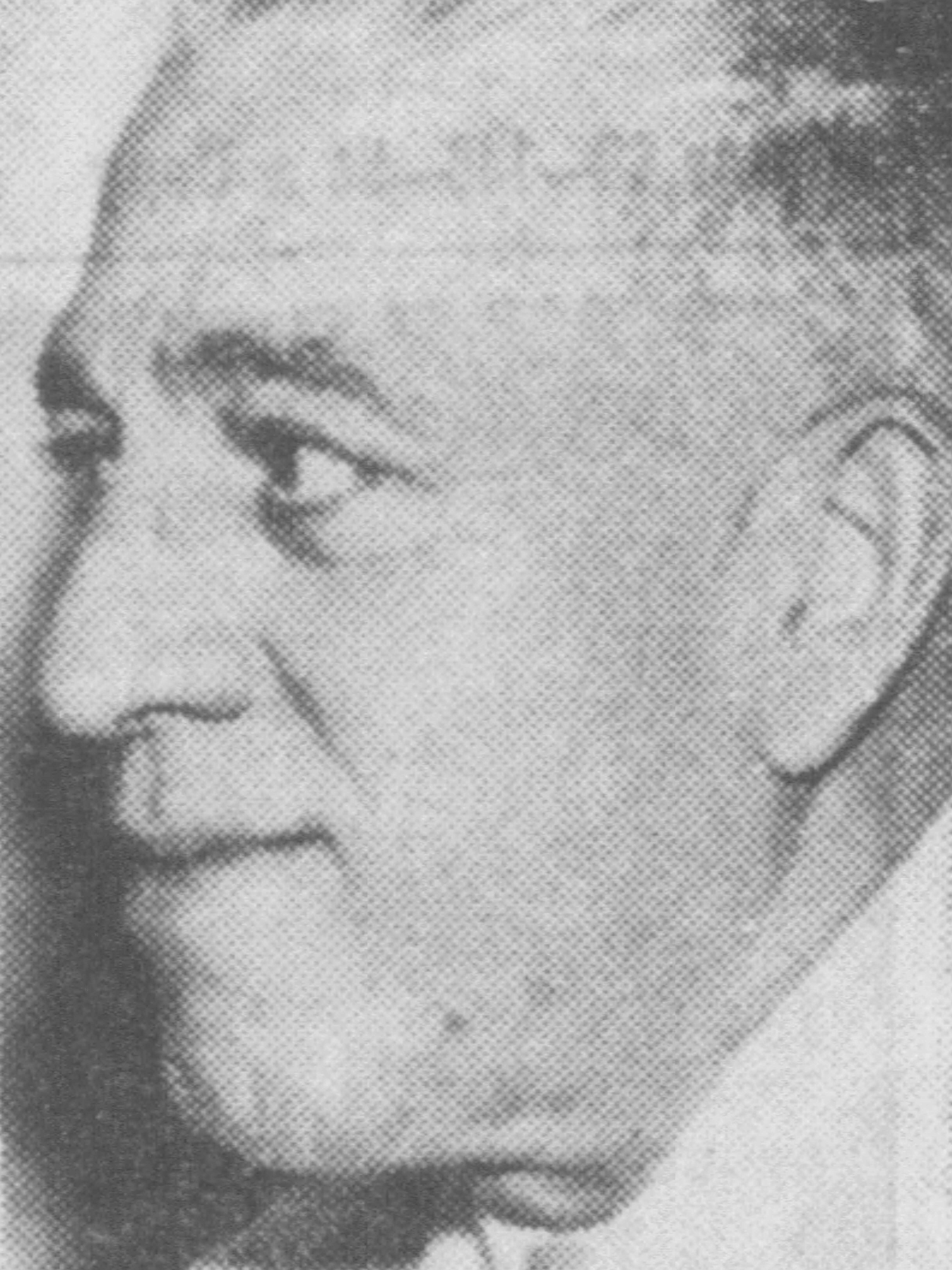
Nominee	William Stratton	Richard B. Austin (replacing Herbert C. Paschen)
Party	Republican	Democratic
Popular vote	2,171,786	2,134,909
Percentage	50.34%	49.48%
- County results Stratton: 50–60% 60–70% 70–80% Austin: 40–50% 50–60% 60–70%
Governor before election
William Stratton
Republican
Elected Governor
William Stratton
Republican

The 1956 Illinois gubernatorial election was held in Illinois on November 6, 1956. Incumbent Governor William Stratton, a Republican, narrowly won reelection to a second term. Stratton's narrow victory came despite the fact that the Republican ticket of Dwight D. Eisenhower and Richard Nixon carried the state of Illinois in a landslide in the presidential election.

== Background ==
The primaries and general election both coincided with those for federal offices (United States President, House, and United States Senate) and those for other state offices. The election was part of the 1956 Illinois elections.

In the primaries (held on April 10, 1960), turnout was 32.56%, with a total of 1,620,871 votes cast.

In the general election, turnout was 82.69%, with a total of 4,314,611 ballots cast.

== Democratic primary ==
=== Candidates ===
Ran

- Herbert C. Paschen, Cook County treasurer and 1952 lieutenant gubernatorial nominee
- Morris B. Sach, Chicago treasurer

Declined to run

- Stephen A. Mitchell, former chair of the Democratic National Committee and candidate for 1960 gubernatorial nomination
- Sargent Shriver, president of the Chicago Board of Education

=== Results ===
Democratic primary
Party	Candidate	Votes	%
Democratic	Herbert C. Paschen	475,813	57.80
Democratic	Morris B. Sachs	347,458	42.20
Write-in		10	0.00
Total votes		823,281	100

== Republican primary ==
=== Candidates ===
- Lawrence Joseph Sarsfield Daly, perennial candidate
- William Stratton, incumbent governor
- Sidney McKee Ward
- Anthony A. Polley
- Warren Wright, Illinois treasurer

=== Results ===
Republican primary
Party	Candidate	Votes	%
Republican	William G. Stratton (incumbent)	556,909	69.82
Republican	Warren E. Wright	187,645	23.53
Republican	Lar "America First" Daly	24,808	3.11
Republican	Sidney McKee Ward	15,979	2.00
Republican	Anthony A. Polley	12,217	1.53
Write-in		32	0.00
Total votes		797,590	100

== General election ==
Democratic nominee Herbert C. Paschen became embroiled in scandal related to his tenure as Cook County Treasurer. Paschen withdrew as the nominee, and was replaced by Richard B. Austin.

Gubernatorial election
Party	Candidate	Votes	%
Republican	William G. Stratton (incumbent)	2,171,786	50.34
Democratic	Richard B. Austin	2,134,909	49.48
Socialist Labor	Edward C. Cross	7,874	0.18
Write-in		42	0.00
Total votes		4,314,611	100
