= Richard B. Austin =

United States federal judge (1901–1977)

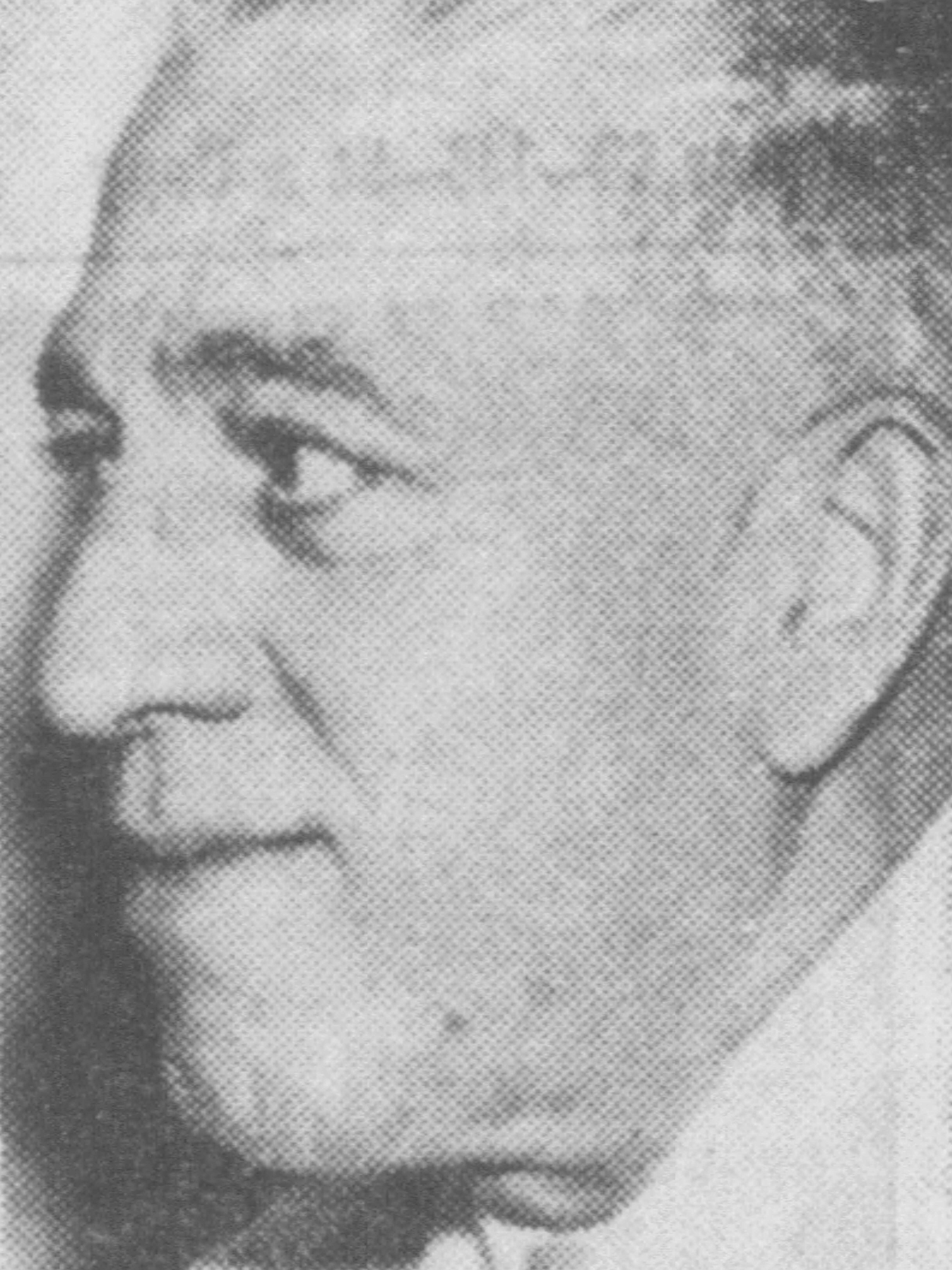
- Austin, circa 1961

Senior Judge of the United States District Court for the Northern District of Illinois
- In office October 10, 1975 – February 7, 1977

Judge of the United States District Court for the Northern District of Illinois
- In office August 15, 1961 – October 10, 1975
- Appointed by: John F. Kennedy
- Preceded by: Walter J. LaBuy
- Succeeded by: John Powers Crowley

Chief Justice of the Criminal Court of Cook County
- In office 1960–1961
- In office 1954–1955

Judge of the Superior Court of Cook County
- In office 1953–1960

Acting Cook County State's Attorney
- In office 1947–1948
- Preceded by: William J. Tuohy
- Succeeded by: John S. Boyle

First Assistant State's Attorney of Cook County
- In office 1952–1953
- State's Attorney: John Gutknecht
- In office 1947–1948
- State's Attorney: William J. Tuohy

Personal details
- Born: Richard Bevan Austin; January 23, 1901 Chicago, Illinois
- Died: February 7, 1977 (aged 76) Chicago, Illinois
- Education: Denison University (Ph.B.); University of Chicago Law School (J.D.)

Richard Bevan Austin (January 23, 1901 – February 7, 1977) was a United States District Judge of the United States District Court for the Northern District of Illinois.

== Education and career ==
Born in Chicago, Illinois, Austin received a Bachelor of Philosophy from Denison University in 1923 and a J.D. degree from the University of Chicago Law School in 1926. He was in private practice in Chicago from 1926 to 1933, and again from 1948 to 1952, having served as an assistant state's attorney of Cook County, Illinois from 1933 to 1947, and as a first assistant state's attorney of Cook County from 1947 to 1948 and from 1952 to 1953. He was an acting state's attorney of Cook County from 1947 to 1948, and a special prosecutor from 1951 to 1952. He was a judge of the Superior Court of Cook County from 1953 to 1960. He was chief justice of the Criminal Court of Cook County from 1954 to 1955, running unsuccessfully as the Democratic nominee for governor of Illinois in 1956 (replacing Herbert C. Paschen as the party's nominee), and again served as chief justice of the court from 1960 to 1961.

== Federal judicial service ==
On August 7, 1961, Austin was nominated by President John F. Kennedy to a seat on the United States District Court for the Northern District of Illinois vacated by Judge Walter J. LaBuy. Austin was confirmed by the United States Senate on August 15, 1961, and received his commission the same day. He assumed senior status on October 10, 1975, serving in that capacity until his death on February 7, 1977, in Chicago.

== Sources ==
Party political offices
Preceded by Sherwood Dixon	Democratic nominee for Governor of Illinois; 1956	Succeeded by Otto Kerner Jr.
Legal offices
Preceded by Walter J. LaBuy	Judge of the United States District Court for the Northern District of Illinois; 1961–1975	Succeeded by John Powers Crowley
