= Chester A. Chesney =

American politician (1916–1986)

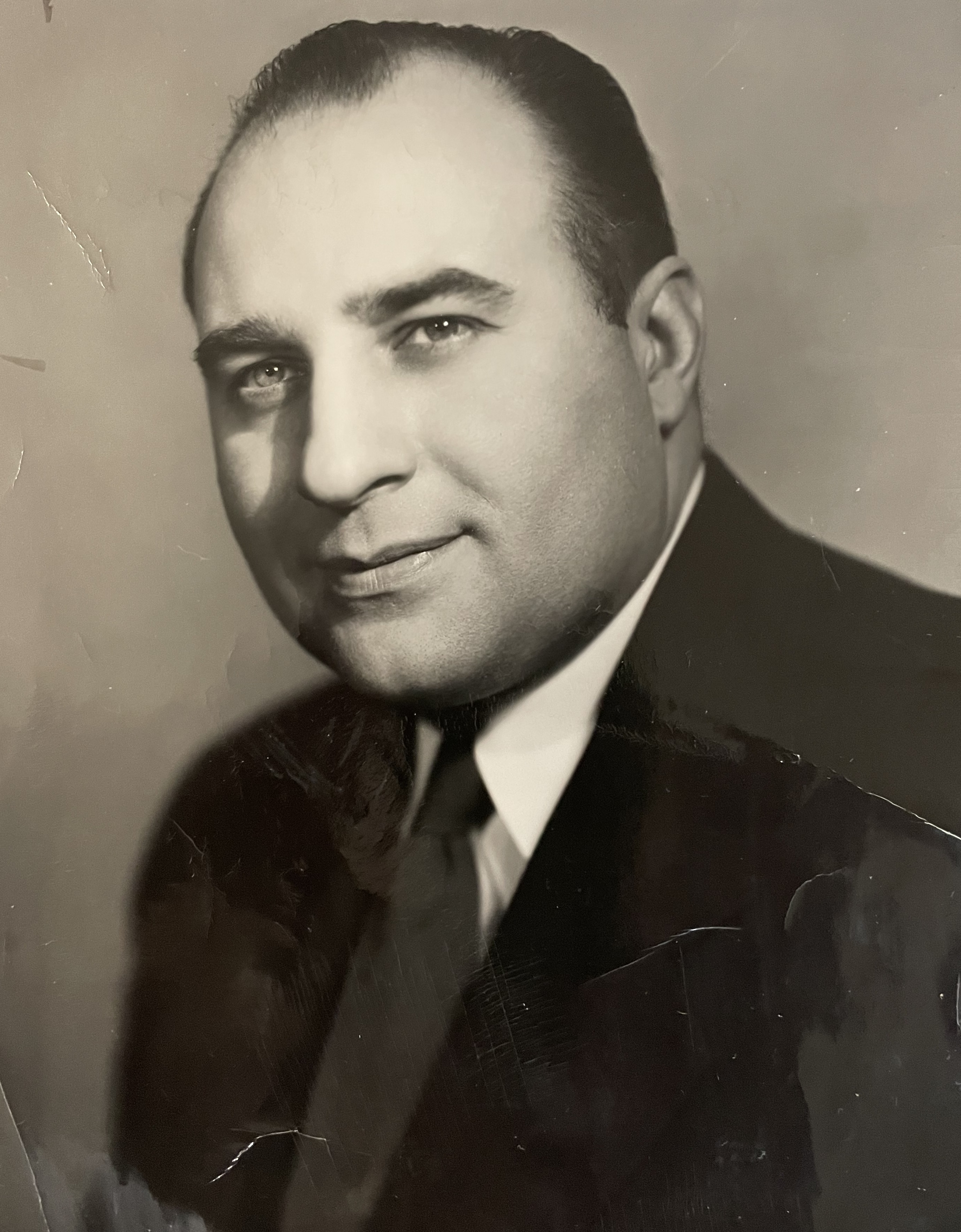
- 1950 photo by Harris & Ewing (Washington, D.C.)

Member of the U.S. House of Representatives from Illinois's 11th district
- In office January 3, 1949 – January 3, 1951
- Preceded by: Chauncey W. Reed
- Succeeded by: Timothy P. Sheehan

Personal details
- Born: Chester Anton Chesney; March 9, 1916 Chicago, Illinois, US
- Died: September 20, 1986 (aged 70) Marco Island, Florida, US
- Party: Democratic
- Education: DePaul University

Military service
- Allegiance: United States
- Branch/service: United States Army
- Years of service: 1941–1946
- Rank: Major
- Unit: Air Corps
- Football career

No. 56
- Position: Center

Personal information
- Listed height: 6 ft 2 in (1.88 m)
- Listed weight: 227 lb (103 kg)

Career information
- College: DePaul University

Career history
- Chicago Bears (1939–1940)

Awards and highlights
- NFL champion (1940)
- Stats at Pro Football Reference

Chester Anton Chesney (March 9, 1916 – September 20, 1986) was a U.S. representative from Illinois.

== Early life and education ==
Chesney was born in Chicago, Illinois, of Polish descent. He attended St. Hyacinth and Lane Technical High School. He graduated from the DePaul University, Chicago, Illinois, in 1938.

== Early career ==
Chesney later played professional football with the Chicago Bears in 1939 and 1940.

He entered the United States Air Force in June 1941 as a private and was discharged as a major in 1946 with service in the Pacific and European Theaters. He served as assistant chief of special service, Veterans Administration, Hines, Illinois, in 1946 and 1947.

After the war, he took graduate work at Northwestern University Graduate Commerce School in 1947. He became an Executive with Montgomery Ward & Co., in 1948 and 1949. He later served as vice-president and director of Avondale Savings & Loan Association.

== Political career ==
Chesney was elected as a Democrat to the Eighty-first Congress (January 3, 1949 – January 3, 1951). He was an unsuccessful candidate for reelection in 1950 to the Eighty-second Congress, though served as delegate to the 1968 Democratic National Convention.

== Personal life ==
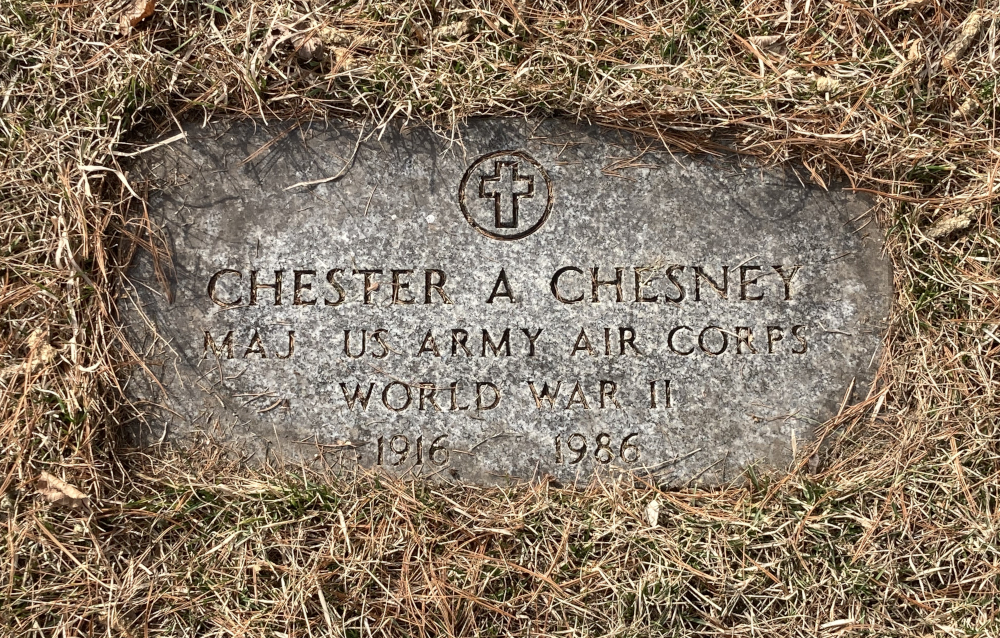
Chesney's grave at St. Adalbert Cemetery

He was a resident of Marco Island, Florida, until his death there September 20, 1986. He was interred in St. Adalbert Cemetery, Niles, Illinois.

U.S. House of Representatives
Preceded by Chauncey Reed	Member of the U.S. House of Representatives from Illinois's 11th congressional district 1949–1951	Succeeded by Timothy P. Sheehan
