= 1973 United States House of Representatives elections =

Four members of the U.S. House of Representatives were elected in special elections in 1973 to the 93rd United States Congress.

== List of elections ==
Elections are listed by date and district.

District	Incumbent			This race	
District	Member	Party	First elected	Results	Candidates
Alaska at-large	Nick Begich	Democratic	1970	Incumbent disappeared in a plane crash and declared dead. New member elected March 6, 1973. Republican gain.	▌ ✓ Don Young (Republican) 51.4%; ▌Emil Notti (Democratic) 48.6%
Louisiana 2	Hale Boggs	Democratic	1940	Incumbent lost in a plane crash and declared dead January 3, 1973. New member elected March 20, 1973. Democratic hold.	▌ ✓ Lindy Boggs (Democratic) 80.4%; ▌Robert E. Lee (Republican) 19.6%
Maryland 1	William Mills	Republican	1971 (special)	Incumbent died May 24, 1973. New member elected August 21, 1973. Republican hold.	▌ ✓ Robert Bauman (Republican) 51.2%; ▌Frederick Malkus (Democratic) 48.8%
Illinois 7	George W. Collins	Democratic	1970 (special)	Incumbent member-elect died December 8, 1972, during the previous congress. New member elected June 5, 1973. Democratic hold.	▌ ✓ Cardiss Collins (Democratic) 92.5%; ▌Angel Moreno (Independent) 3.9%; ▌Lawrence Daly (Republican) 3.6%
