= Robert E. Merriam =

American governmental official

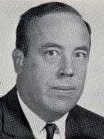
Merriam as a White House staffer

Robert Edward Merriam (October 2, 1918 – 1988) was born in Chicago, Illinois, the son of Charles E. Merriam, and earned an MA degree from the University of Chicago in 1940.

From 1942 to 1964, Merriam was a captain in the United States Army. While serving as director of the Metropolitan Housing Council in Chicago from 1946 to 1947, Merriam authored Dark December: the Full Account of the Battle of the Bulge.

From 1947 to 1955, Merriam was an alderman on the Chicago City Council (representing the 5th ward) and chairman of the Commission on Housing and Emergency Commission on Crime. During this period he co-authored The American Government: Democracy in Action with his father. Merriam was the Republican nominee for Mayor of Chicago in 1955, but was defeated by Richard J. Daley, the Democratic nominee.

From 1955 to 1958, Merriam served as an assistant director at the US Bureau of Budget. By 1958 he became the deputy director. During this period he authored Going Into Politics in 1957. Merriam ended his government career after serving as deputy assistant to the president under Dwight D. Eisenhower from 1958 to 1961.
