= Ben Adamowski =

American politician and lawyer (1906–1982)

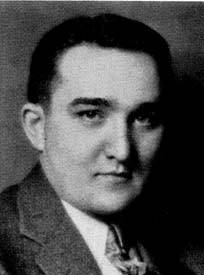
- Adamowski, circa 1939

Cook County State's Attorney
- In office 1956–1960
- Preceded by: John S. Boyle
- Succeeded by: Daniel P. Ward

Member of the Illinois House of Representatives from the 25th district
- In office 1931–1941

Personal details
- Born: November 20, 1906
- Died: March 1, 1982 (age 75)
- Party: Republican (since 1955)
- Other political affiliations: Democratic (until 1955)
- Education: DePaul University College of Law

Benjamin S. Adamowski (November 20, 1906 – March 1, 1982) was a politician and lawyer.

== Early life ==
His father, Max Adamowski, was an alderman in Chicago, as well as a real estate agent in Logan Square, and tavern owner. He graduated from DePaul University Law School in 1928.

== Career ==
He served in the Illinois House of Representatives, representing the 25th District from 1931 through 1941. In the legislature, he distanced himself from the machine politics his father had been aligned with, and aligned himself with liberal reformist governor Henry Horner. In 1940, Adamowski unsuccessfully sought the Democratic nomination in the special U.S. Senate election.

In 1941, Adamowski left the legislature to serve as the Corporation Counsel of Chicago under Mayor Martin H. Kennelly, a role he held for at least three years.

He was a Democrat until 1955, when he was defeated by Richard J. Daley in the Democratic primary for mayor. In later campaigns for State's Attorney and a second bid for mayor against Daley in 1963 he ran as a Republican.

He served from 1957 to 1960 as State's Attorney of Cook County. In May 1959, he uncovered a $500,000-a-year ticket-fixing scandal in Chicago Traffic Court, and indicted four court employees on corruption charges.

He died at Presbyterian-St. Luke's Hospital in Chicago on March 1, 1982.
