= John Powers Crowley =

American judge (1936–1989)

Judge of the United States District Court for the Northern District of Illinois
- In office June 16, 1976 – June 30, 1981
- Appointed by: Gerald Ford
- Preceded by: Richard B. Austin
- Succeeded by: William Thomas Hart

Personal details
- Born: John Powers Crowley; October 5, 1936 Chicago, Illinois
- Died: January 10, 1989 (aged 52) Evanston, Illinois
- Education: DePaul University College of Law (LL.B.); New York University School of Law (LL.M.)

John Powers Crowley (October 5, 1936 – January 10, 1989) was a United States district judge of the United States District Court for the Northern District of Illinois.

== Education and career ==
Born in Chicago, Illinois, Crowley received a Bachelor of Laws from DePaul University College of Law in 1960 and a Master of Laws from New York University School of Law in 1961. He was an Assistant United States Attorney of the Northern District of Illinois from 1961 to 1965, and was thereafter in private practice in Chicago from 1965 to 1976.

== Federal judicial service ==
On May 18, 1976, Crowley was nominated by President Gerald Ford to a seat on the United States District Court for the Northern District of Illinois vacated by Judge Richard B. Austin. Crowley was confirmed by the United States Senate on June 16, 1976, and received his commission the same day. Crowley served in that capacity until his resignation on June 30, 1981.

== Post judicial service and death ==
After retiring from the federal bench, Crowley returned to the private practice of law. He was diagnosed with cancer in October 1987 and died on January 10, 1989, in Evanston, Illinois, remaining active in the practice of law until a few months before his death.

== Sources ==
Legal offices
Preceded by Richard B. Austin	Judge of the United States District Court for the Northern District of Illinois; 1976–1981	Succeeded by William Thomas Hart
