= Frank Keenan (politician) =

American politician

John Francis Keenan (Frank Keenan)
- Born: 1924
- Died: June 27, 2009 (aged 84–85)
- Occupations: Legislative assistant and campaign worker
- Criminal charges: Tax evasion

John Francis Keenan, most commonly known as Frank Keenan, was an American legislative assistant and campaign worker. He most famously worked under former U.S. Senator John Sherman Cooper, as well as the former Mayor of Chicago Richard J. Daley (see: 1955 Chicago Mayoral Election).

== Tax evasion hearing ==
On April 30, 1957, Keenan was charged with tax evasion in a Washington, D.C., federal court of law, before Judge Duffy. He had been avoiding paying a large portion of his taxes from the years 1950 to 1952. In total, the scheme racked up an indictment count of eleven.
