= Martin H. Kennelly =

American politician

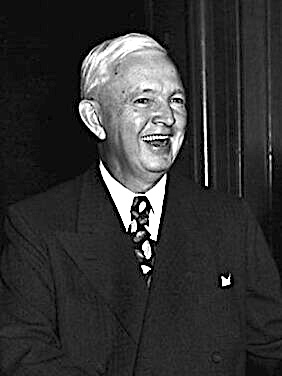
- Kennelly in 1949

47th Mayor of Chicago
- In office April 15, 1947 – April 20, 1955
- Preceded by: Edward Joseph Kelly
- Succeeded by: Richard J. Daley

10th President of the United States Conference of Mayors
- In office 1952–1953
- Preceded by: David L. Lawrence
- Succeeded by: Thomas A. Burke

Personal details
- Born: Martin Henry Kennelly; August 11, 1887 Chicago, Illinois, U.S.
- Died: November 29, 1961 (aged 74) Chicago, Illinois, U.S.
- Resting place: Calvary Cemetery (Evanston, Illinois, U.S.)
- Party: Democratic
- Education: De La Salle Institute

Military service
- Allegiance: United States
- Branch/service: United States Army
- Rank: Captain
- Battles/wars: World War I

Martin Henry Kennelly (August 11, 1887 – November 29, 1961) was an American politician and businessman. He served as the 47th Mayor of Chicago in Chicago, Illinois from April 15, 1947 until April 20, 1955. Kennelly was a member of the Democratic Party. According to biographer Peter O'Malley, he was chosen as mayor by a scandal-burdened Democratic machine that needed a reformer on top of the ticket. Kennelly was a wealthy businessman and civic leader, active in Irish and Catholic circles. As a long-time opponent of machine politics he accepted the nomination on condition the machine would not pressure him for patronage and that he did not have to play a leadership role in the party. This gave him a non-partisan image that satisfied the reform element. As mayor he avoided partisanship and concentrated on building infrastructure and upgrading the city bureaucracy. He worked to extend civil service; he reorganized inefficient departments. The city took ownership of the mass transit system. He obtained federal aid for slum clearance and public housing projects and for new expressways construction. At his death, Mayor Richard J. Daley, the party leader who defeated Kennelly in a bitter primary battle in 1955, called him, "a great Chicagoan who loved his city" and ordered City Hall flags placed at half-mast.

== Early life ==
Kennelly was born in Chicago's Bridgeport neighborhood, the youngest of five children. He served in the Army during World War I with the rank of captain. After the war he returned to Chicago and entered the moving and storage business, and lived on the north end of Lake Shore Drive (5555 North Sheridan Road).

== Early career ==
He was the founder and first president of Allied Van Lines, an alliance that united independent local moving and storage companies under a single brand. A contemporary of Marshall Field's, a prominent Chicago retailer, Kennelly's moving company got the contract for Chicago's Field Museum of Natural History. After retiring, he was involved in social and civic affairs. He was the head of the Chicago chapter of the American Red Cross during World War II.

== Mayor of Chicago ==
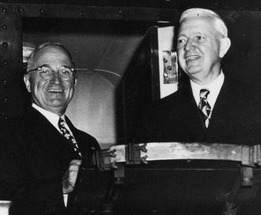
Kennelly, right, with President Harry S. Truman during a presidential visit to Chicago in 1948

When the city administration of Edward J. Kelly was threatened with defeat by corruption, scandal and Kelly's liberal integrationist policies (Kelly notably had said that African-Americans were free to live anywhere in the city) the Cook County Democratic Party Machine responded by slating Kennelly as a reform candidate. Kennelly returned to the Bridgeport neighborhood and ran for mayor from an apartment in the predominantly Irish American working-class community of his childhood. Kennelly was elected in 1947, receiving 920,000 (59%) votes defeating Republican Russell Root. Kennelly oversaw early milestones in the effort to establish a greater degree of self-government for the city of Chicago, creating a Chicago Home Rule Commission in 1953 to study ways for the city to obtain home rule and establish a new city charter. Kennelly proved to be too independent and reform-oriented for his regular Democratic Party sponsors and was dumped by the party bosses at the 1955 endorsement slating in favor of Richard J. Daley. Daley soundly defeated Kennelly in the 1955 Democratic primary and went on to win the general election.

In 1952 and 1953, Kennelly served as president of the United States Conference of Mayors.

== Death ==
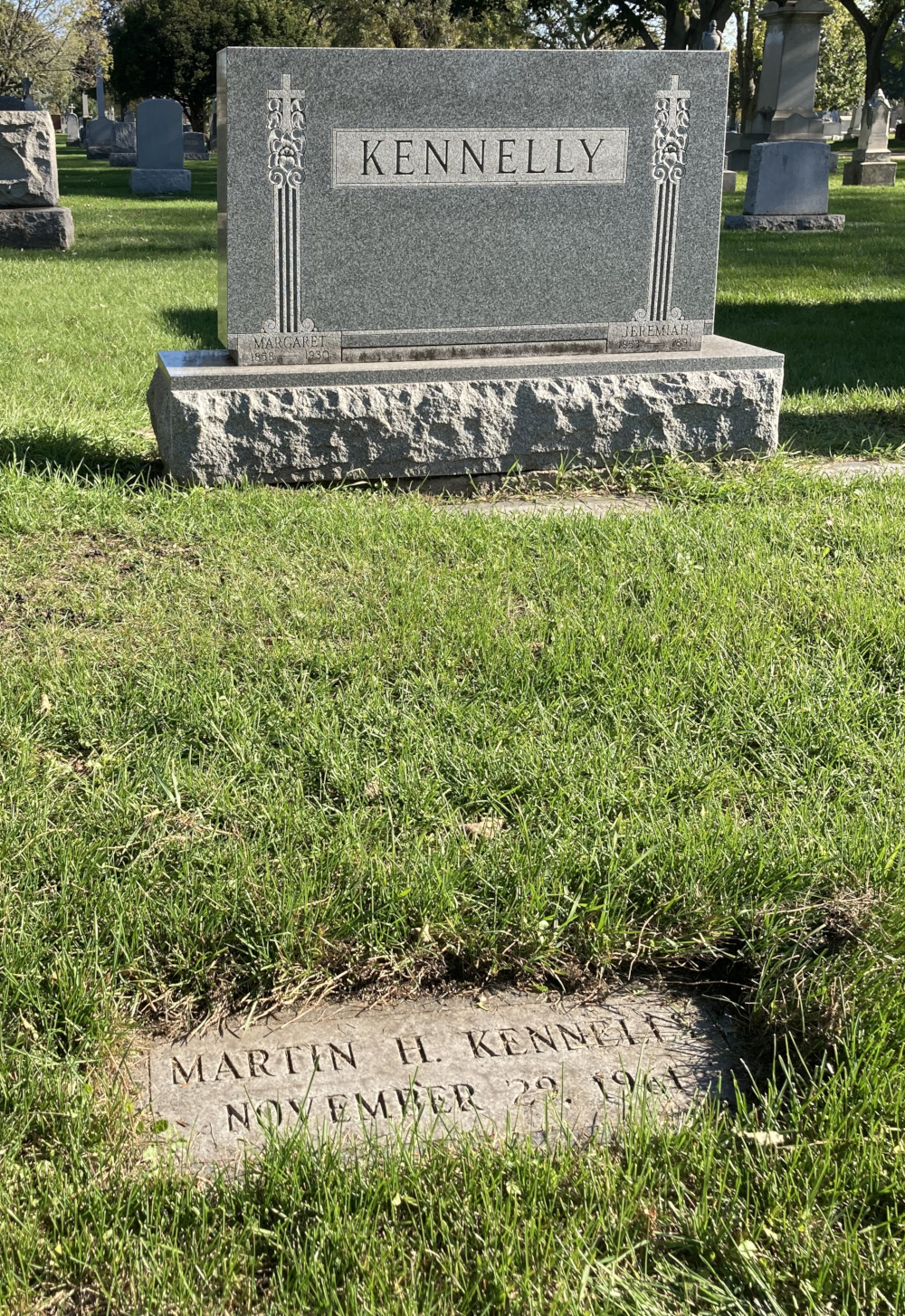
Kennelly's grave at Calvary Cemetery

Kennelly died from heart failure on November 29, 1961, at age 74, and was interred at Calvary Cemetery in Evanston, Illinois.

Political offices
Preceded by Edward Joseph Kelly	Mayor of Chicago; April 15, 1947–April 20, 1955	Succeeded by Richard J. Daley
