= Timothy P. Sheehan =

American politician (1909–2000)

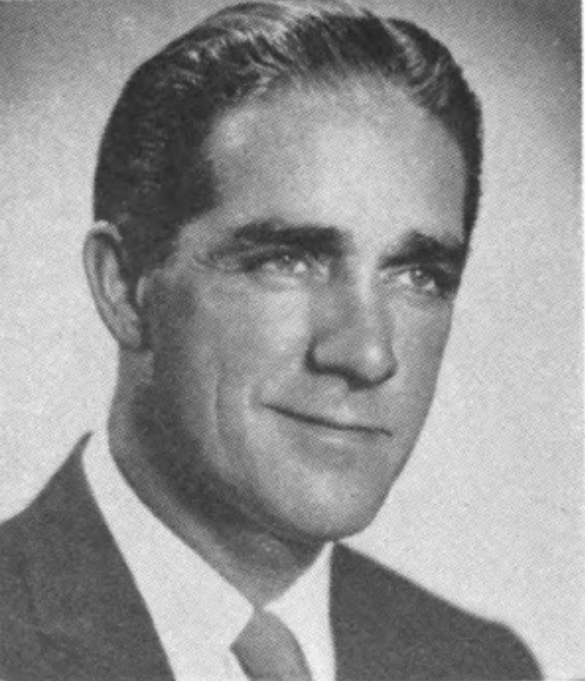

Member of the U.S. House of Representatives from Illinois's 11th district
- In office January 3, 1951 – January 3, 1959
- Preceded by: Chester A. Chesney
- Succeeded by: Roman Pucinski

Personal details
- Born: February 21, 1909 Chicago, Illinois, U.S.
- Died: October 8, 2000 (aged 91) Chicago, Illinois, U.S.
- Party: Republican

Timothy Patrick Sheehan (February 21, 1909 – October 8, 2000) of Chicago was a U.S. representative from Illinois from 1951 to 1959. He was a candidate for mayor of Chicago in 1959.

Sheehan was well respected by a number of prominent Democrats of his era, including Senator Robert F. Kennedy. He was responsible for mentoring a number of the current members of the House of Representatives and the Senate. Despite losing a lop-sided election to Mayor Daley in 1959, Sheehan remained friendly with his Democrat counterpart for years to come. Mayor Daley once stated, out of respect for the Illinois Congressman, "he should have been a Democrat." Sheehan voted in favor of the Civil Rights Act of 1957.

During his tenure in the House of Representatives, Sheehan served with some the most famous Americans of the 20th Century, including John F. Kennedy, Richard Nixon, and Gerald Ford.

Sheehan made the statement that the United States should consider annexation of Canada during the start of the Cold War, which received notoriety in the USSR propaganda entitled "Yankees in Canada", which portrayed America as expansionist.

U.S. House of Representatives
Preceded by Chester Chesney	Member of the U.S. House of Representatives from Illinois's 11th congressional district 1951–1959	Succeeded by Roman Pucinski
