= William J. Tuohy =

American lawyer and judge (died 1963)

Judge of the Circuit Court of Cook County
- In office 1950–1963

Cook County State's Attorney
- In office 1944–1947
- Deputy: Richard B. Austin
- Preceded by: Thomas J. Courtney
- Succeeded by: John S. Boyle; Richard B. Austin (acting)

Personal details
- Died: 1963
- Party: Democratic Party

William J. Tuohy (died 1963) was an American judge and attorney. In Cook County, Illinois (home to Chicago), he held office as State's Attorney (county prosecutor) from 1947 to 1947 and as a judge on the Cook County Circuit Court from 1950 until his head in 1963.

== Cook County State's Attorney ==
A Democrat, Tuohy was elected in 1944 to a four-year term as Cook County State's Attorney (county prosecutor). As State's Attorney, he set a county record in the amount of convictions his office won in its criminal cases.

Tuohy left the office in 1947, before the end of his elected term. His deputy, First Assistant State's Attorney Richard B. Austin, was made the Acting State's Attorney for the remaining portion of his term.

== Judge of the Cook County Circuit Court ==
In 1950, Tuohy became a judge on the Cook County Circuit Court. He held this judgeship until his death in 1963 at the age of 65.

== Personal life ==
Tuohy was the uncle of Jim Tuohy, a journalist known for exposés he on judicial corruption in Chicagoland region which precursed the Operation Greylord.
