= 1955 Chicago mayoral election =

- April 5, 1955
- Turnout: 64.2% ▲7.4 pp

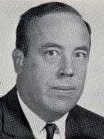
Nominee	Richard J. Daley	Robert E. Merriam
Party	Democratic	Republican
Popular vote	708,660	581,461
Percentage	54.93%	45.07%
Mayor before election
Martin H. Kennelly
Democratic
Elected Mayor
Richard Joseph Daley
Democratic

The 1955 Chicago mayoral election saw Democrat Richard J. Daley win election to his first term as mayor by a ten-point margin over Republican Robert E. Merriam. This was the narrowest margin of victory of any of Daley's mayoral races.

Daley had defeated incumbent mayor Martin H. Kennelly in the Democratic Party's primary election in order to win the Democratic nomination. As the newly seated Cook County Democratic Party chairman, Daley refused Kennelly the party' endorsement in the primary election, and instead challenged Kennelly in the primary, taking the party's endorsement for himself. Daley and others had believed that Kennelly would be a weak candidate against Merriam, who was perceived to be the likely Republican nominee. Daley and the Democratic Party establishment also feared that Kennelly might dismantle the city's patronage system. Also challenging Kennelly was State Representative Benjamin S. Adamowski, who ran as an anti-political machine candidate. Daley won 49.05% of the vote in the primary, held on February 22, 1955. Kennelly won 35.42% and Adamowski won 15.02%. The remaining 0.51% was won by minor contender Clarence Balek.

== Background ==
Democrats had won all citywide elections since 1931. During the countywide elections of November 1954, Republicans were handed a heavy defeat. Since the municipal elections would exclude the Republican party's suburban bastions of support (many of which partook in the Cook County elections), it was expected that Republicans would do even worse in the municipal elections. Among the Democrats which had won election in 1954 was Richard J. Daley, who was elected Cook County Clerk with a 390,000 plurality. Incumbent Democratic mayor Martin H. Kennelly had some challenges heading into the election. He saw disapproval among both white and black citizens for his handling of the city's rising racial tensions. His distance from organized labor and his push for civil service reform had earned strong disapproval from many in the Democratic Party organization. In addition, the ambitious Richard J. Daley had been elected the new Chairman of the Cook County Democratic Party.

== Nominations ==
Primary elections were held February 22, 1955. 52.67% of registered voters participated in the primary elections.

=== Democratic primary ===
Daley defeated incumbent mayor Martin H. Kennelly and State Representative Benjamin S. Adamowski in the Democratic primary. Kennelly announced on December 1, 1954, that he would seek reelection. His campaign would be managed by Frank Keenan.

Daley, the new Cook County Democratic Party chairman, refused Kennelly the party's endorsement and instead ran against Kennelly in the primary, taking the party's endorsement for himself. One reason for this was that Daley and others anticipated that likely Republican nominee Robert Merriam would be a strong candidate, and believed that Kennelly might be too weak to defeat him. Additionally, Kennelly had lost support of segments of the city's African American electorate due to his failure to address crime and reform the city's police department. The Democratic establishment also feared that Kennelly would disassemble the city's patronage system. Kennelly was also blamed by many Democrats for failing to quell disputes within the party which had led to an underperformance of the party in the previous aldermanic election.

Adamowski was formerly a political ally of Daley. Adamowski framed his candidacy as opposing the political machine. He had been hoping that Kennelly would ultimately withdraw from the race, leaving the race an effectively two-man campaign between him and Daley. Adamowski was then counting on the anti-machine vote compounded with his popularity among the city's sizable Polish electorate to possibly secure him a victory over Daley. In the backdrop, during the lead up to the primary election, was racial tensions at the Trumbull Park Homes, operated by the Chicago Housing Authority. White residents violently protested the presence of number of black families in the housing project. The CHA consequently "froze" the number of black families it would allow to live in the project, but this did little to quell the protests. Kennelly did not intervene. This massively turned black voters against Kennelly's candidacy.

With dwindling prospects of receiving the black vote, Kennelly made a miscalculation and attempted to receive white backlash votes. He utilized racial stereotypes in his campaign, and made blatant attempts at race baiting. Attempting to use William L. Dawson as a boogeyman, he claimed that Dawson was the one who "pushed the controls in the 'Dump Kennelly project". Daily news outlets echoed his accusations. African American press outlets such as The Chicago Defender strongly criticized Kennelly's tactics. Kennelly's racist campaign ultimately drove strong African-American support for Daley's candidacy, as black voters were now driven to kick Kennelly out of office.

Without machine backing, Kennelly framed his campaign as a fight of, "the people against the bosses", arguing that he had won the opposition of the machine due to his attempts at civil service reform challenging the patronage system. Kennelly's anti-machine positioning became rather opportune when a scandal broke with reports that Alderman Benjamin Becker, the machine's slated candidate City Clerk, had been receiving kickbacks from zoning case revenue from an attorney that was a former 40th Ward machine operative. Kennelly thought he could beat Daley's machine organizing with use of television commercials.

Daley's campaign, being backed by the Democratic machine, was run out of its base in the Morrison Hotel. Daley's campaign focused on coordinating efforts and assisting the ward organizations that would turn out voters on Election Day. Daley spent little time campaigning before the general electorate or proposing policy on hot-button issues, and most of his candidacy focused on machine oiling the gears of the machine, appearing mostly before machine workers and ward organizations rather than before the general electorate. Luncheons and rallies were held for precinct captains at the large downtown hotels and at numerous civic centers across the city. On Valentine's Day of 1955, Daley spoke before an audience of nearly 5,000 machine workers jammed into the Civic Opera House. In his speeches before machine workers and leaders, Daley exalted the machine.

Daley's camp was able to get many government workers, beneficiaries of patronage and concerned about their jobs in light of Kennelly's plans for civil service reform, to strongly back Daley's candidacy. Daley's supporters used some threats of violence in their coercion of support. Daley's operations were well-funded by the machine. Much of the nefariously obtained "juice money" the machine had raked in went to support get-out-the-vote efforts for Daley. Additionally, they were able to extract financial backing from companies that did business with the city and the county, which were concerned about securing their government contracts. To combat any anti-machine sentiments, Daley sought to associate himself with individuals that would give him an appearance of being a reform candidate. He had a lawyer that had been an important backer of Paul Douglas's 1948 US Senate campaign to head the "Volunteers for Daley" committee that was to attract non-machine Democrats to Daley's candidacy.

Daley tried to frame the division in the city as not being machine vs. reformers, but rather business elites vs. blue collar neighborhoods. His supporters, portraying Kennelly as a strong elite, even attempted to portray machine boss Daley as a sort of working-class underdog. Daley also received backing from fraternal organizations and the city's major labor unions. This trade union backing further strengthened Daley's working-class bonafides. Daley was not above the selective use of dog whistles. On one occasion. speaking before a largely white group of 7,500 United Packinghouse Workers of America Workers on February 17, 1955, Daley said that the Chicago Police Department should "not be used to advance the interests of any one group over another", which was a dog whistle for meaning that he did not support the role of police integrating Trumbull Park. Both Kennelly and Adamowski sought to illustrate a dark future if Daley were elected. Towards the end of the campaign, opinion polling showed Kennelly leading by a significant margin. A Chicago Tribune poll showed almost 57% of 104 respondents backing Kennelly and only 33% backing Daley. Kennelly's camp was tooting their horn at signs that the support lay with their candidate. Kennelly's camp was hoping for high turnout, especially since the primary fell on the bank and school holiday of Washington's Birthday. His camp believed that a turnout above 900,000 would secure him reelection.

==== Results ====
Chicago Democratic mayoral primary, 1955
Party	Candidate	Votes	%
Democratic	Richard J. Daley	369,692	49.05
Democratic	Martin H. Kennelly (incumbent)	266,946	35.42
Democratic	Benjamin S. Adamowski	113,173	15.02
Democratic	Clarence Balek	3,859	0.51
Turnout		753,670	

=== Republican primary ===
Robert E. Merriam won the Republican Party nomination. Merriam was a land developer who had been elected twice to the Chicago City Council as an independent Democrat, receiving sizable Republican support both times. In order to capture the party's mayoral nomination, Merriam changed his affiliation to Republican. Merriam was a liberal. Merriam's own father had been the Republican nominee in Chicago's 1911 mayoral election, and had also unsuccessfully sought the Republican nomination in 1919. In City Council, Merriam had been the leader of a reformer group dubbed the "economy bloc" due to their skepticism to wasteful spending by the machine of city dollars. He was also the chairman of the City Council's crime committee, and the host of the television show named Spotlight on Chicago, both of which had earned him anti-crime bonafides. He was seen as a handsome, charismatic, and articulate candidate. He was not unanimously backed by Republicans, with many ward bosses not wanting to hand the nomination to an individual they did not personally consider to be a true Republican. However, he received the strong backing of governor William Stratton.

== General election ==
Merriam had hoped that the contested Democratic primary would create enough discord in the Democratic party that its electorate might fracture, giving room for a Republican victory. The city's three largest newspapers, the Chicago Tribune, Chicago Sun-Times, and Chicago Daily News all endorsed him. While Merriam did receive the endorsement of the Chicago Tribune, the city's leading Republican newspaper was not enthusiastic about him, viewing him as a fake-Republican. The city's fourth-largest daily newspaper, the Chicago Herald-American, endorsed Daley. It was reported that the Democratic machine had brokered a deal with the ailing Herald-American where their precinct captains would sell subscriptions to the newspapers in exchange for their endorsing Daley.

Three of the city's four daily newspapers cast very negative coverage on the Democrats during the campaign. The Republicans also laid strong criticism of the Democratic Party. This caused the Democratic Party to alter its plans, which were to run a minimal public campaign, and run a more visible unified Democratic campaign for municipal offices. There was thought given to the possibility that Kennelly might endorse Merriam to help sabotage Daley's prospects. However, Democratic machine operatives were able to convince Kennelly that Merriam had sought to have him indicted during earlier criminal investigations. Kennelly ultimately disbelieved Merriam's denial of these claims, and opted against endorsing either candidate. Adamowski also declined to endorse Merriam. Daley and Merriam had contrasting personalities. Merriam had a polished and refined speaking style, while Daley had a thick ethnic Chicago accent and a more brash and clumsy speaking style. Merriam had an image of an intellectual, while Daley had a more working-class image and appeal.

In the heavily Democratic city of Chicago, Daley regularly reminded voters of his and Merriam's party affiliations during the campaign. He also mocked Merriam for being neither a loyal Democrat nor loyal Republican, accusing him of trying to convince Democrats he was not a Republican and Republicans that he was not a Democrat, and remarking at a debate, "I can't think of anything more difficult than trying to mate an elephant with a donkey" (referring to the Republican elephant mascot and Democratic donkey mascot). Merriam sought to get those who voted for Kennelly and Adamowski in the party primaries to cross party-lines, trying to persuade them that his politics were a natural landing ground for supporters of the anti-machine candidates. To attract Kennelly supporters, he pledged that, if elected mayor, he would reappoint Kennelly's Civil Service Commission chairman, an appointee of Kennely's who had received the animus of the Democratic machine. The Independent Voters of Illinois, a typically Democratic-leaning organization, endorsed Merriam.

Issues were not a heavy focus in the campaign. Daley only campaigned on mere platitudes and vague stances. Merriam, on the other hand, offered specific and creative solutions. For instance, to improve transit, Merriam proposed replacing the elevated tracks of The Loop with a subway system and offering transfers between commuter train lines and the city's bus system. Daley attempted to appeal to black voters as someone who supported their civil rights struggle without scaring-off white voters by taking too strong and concrete a stance on such matters. These efforts appeared to pay off. The leading African-American newspaper, The Chicago Defender, endorsed Daley. However, he was also endorsed by the vehemently anti-integration South Deering Improvement Association.

The Democratic machine used some underhanded tactics to hamper Merriam's support. For instance, in the city's working class white Bungalow Belt, it circulated letters claiming praise of Merriam from the made-up "American Negro Civic Association". The also spread rumors in the same neighborhoods that Merriam's wife was black. To hamper his appeal to Catholic voters, they circulated copies of Merriam's divorce papers. In a television appearance on behalf of Daley, Thomas E. Keane praised Daley's family unit by remarking that, "Daley has seven children and they are all his own," reminding viewers that Merriam, who was divorced and remarried, was raising two children his wife had had from her own previous marriage. Daley continued to have the support of trade unions in the general election.

Daley continued his strategy used in the primary of receiving the backing of reform Democrats to deflect criticisms of his machine involvement. In the general election he received the endorsement of 1952 Democratic presidential nominee and former Illinois governor Adlai Stevenson II. In turn, Daley quickly endorsed Stevenson for president in the forthcoming 1956 election. Merriam sought to illustrate a dark future if Daley were elected. He presented an image of an era of corruption if Daley won. After the Chicago Bar Association brought charges against Benjamin Becker, Daley had him removed from the ticket, and John Marcin, previously the nominee for City Treasurer, take his place as City Clerk nominee (and had Morris B. Sachs become City Treasurer nominee). Daley and the Democratic machine had a vast financial advantage over Merriam's campaign.

=== Results ===
Daley's victory can be, in large part, credited to strong support from the city's African American voters. Approximately 20% of the city's voters were African American. Merriam's failure can, likewise, be largely credited to his failure to capture enough of the African American electorate. Daley's win was the narrowest victory in a Chicago mayoral race in over a decade.

Mayor of Chicago 1955 election (General Election)
Party	Candidate	Votes	%
Democratic	Richard J. Daley	708,660	54.93
Republican	Robert E. Merriam	581,461	45.07
Turnout		1,290,121	
