= Babis =

Babis is a Greek masculine given name, a diminutive of the name Charalambos. It also appears as a surname. Notable people with the name include:

== Given name ==
- Babis Akrivopoulos (born 1961), Greek footballer
- Babis Angourakis (born 1951–2014), Greek politician
- Babis Bizas (born 1954), Greek travel writer, explorer and geographer
- Babis Drosos (1927–2015), Greek footballer
- Babis Intzoglou (born 1949), Greek footballer
- Babis Kotridis (1928–2009), Greek footballer
- Babis Papadimitriou (born 1954), Greek journalist and economist
- Babis Psimogiannos (born 1947), Greek footballer
- Babis Stefanidis (born 1981), Swedish football player and coach
- Babis Stokas (born 1968), Greek singer and songwriter
- Babis Taouxis (1930–2006), Greek footballer
- Babis Tennes (born 1953), Greek football player and coach
- Babis Tsertos (born 1956), Greek musician
- Babis Vovos (1933–2024), Greek civil engineer and businessman

== Surname ==
- Kasia Babis (born 1992), Polish cartoonist
- Paris Babis (born 1999), Greek footballer
- Vasilios Babis (born 1996), Greek footballer

== See also ==
- Andrej Babiš (born 1954), Czech politician and businessman
- Babish (disambiguation)
- Báb, a 19th-century Persian prophet
