= Judy Koehler =

American politician (born 1941)

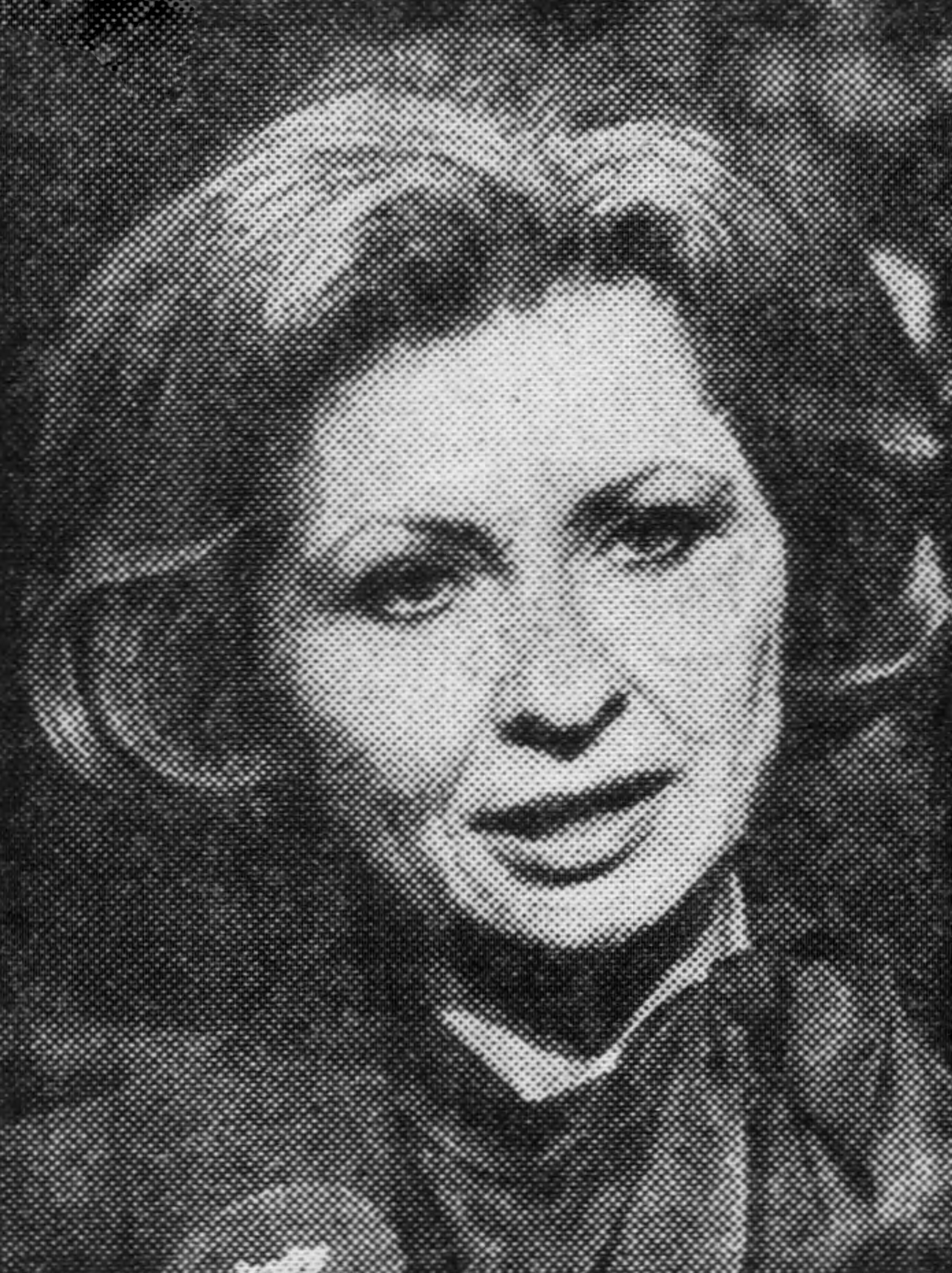
- Koehler in 1986

Member of the Illinois House of Representatives
- In office January 1981 – January 1987
- Preceded by: Donald Anderson
- Succeeded by: Jay Ackerman
- Constituency: 89th district (1981–1983); 45th district (1983–1987)

Personal details
- Born: September 20, 1941 (age 84) Lima, Illinois, U.S.
- Party: Republican
- Education: Stephens College (attended); Western Illinois University (BS); Loyola University Chicago (JD)

Judy Koehler (born September 20, 1941) is an American politician who served as a Republican member of the Illinois House of Representatives and Illinois Appellate Court Justice.

== Illinois House of Representatives ==
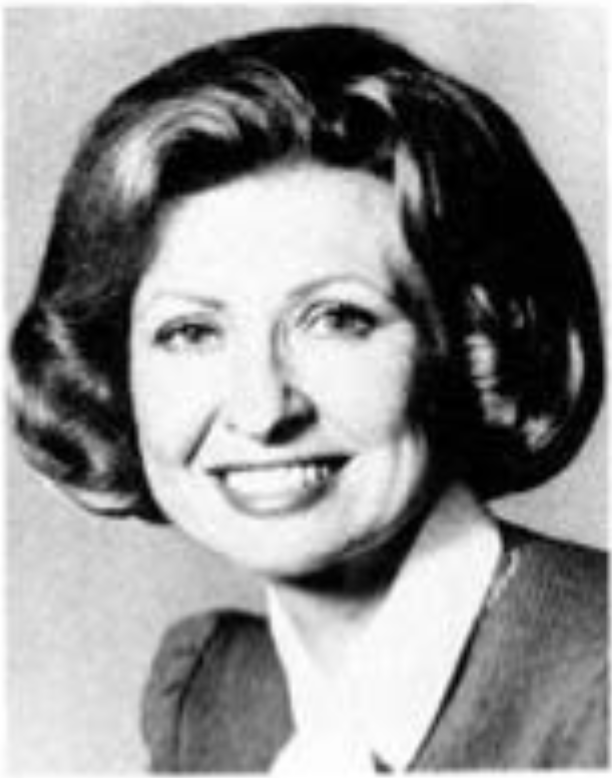
Official Portrait, 1985

Koehler was first elected to the Illinois House of Representatives in 1980, defeating incumbent Representative Donald Anderson in the Republican primary. Koehler received the most votes in the primary, in which the two candidates receiving the most votes were nominated. Koehler also received the most votes in the general election, in which the three candidates receiving the most votes were elected.

Koehler first represented the 45th district, but after the Cutback Amendment was redistricted into the 89th district with fellow incumbent Republican Representative John "Jay" Ackerman. The 89th district included all or parts of Marshall, McLean, Stark, Tazewell, and Woodford counties in north-central Illinois. Koehler defeated Ackerman by a wide margin. In the general election, Koehler defeated Democrat Mike McNally by more than a 3 to 1 margin. Koehler was unopposed in the 1984 general election. Koehler served as Representative for the 89th district until 1987. Koehler's district was based in north-central Illinois.

Koehler opposed the $8,000 a year pay raise that the legislature voted to give itself in a lame-duck session in 1978, and returned $8,000 of her pay to the state treasury every year she was in office, returning a total of $48,000 over her 6 years in office.

== 1986 United States Senate election ==
In 1986, Koehler ran for the United States Senate. Koehler defeated Inland Steel executive George Ranneywik in the Republican primary, but was unable to oust incumbent Alan Dixon in the general election. She was succeeded in the Illinois House of Representatives by John "Jay" Ackerman, who she had defeated in the 1982 Republican primary for the seat.

== Later career ==
In 1992, a graduate of Loyola University Chicago School of Law, Koehler was admitted to the Illinois State Bar. Koehler served as an assistant DuPage County state's attorney. In 1994, Koehler ran for U.S. Congress in Illinois's 18th congressional district to replace the retiring Republican Robert H. Michel. Koehler lost in the primary to Michel's Chief of Staff and endorsed successor Ray LaHood.

Following her run for Congress, Koehler became senior legislative counsel of Americans United for Life. In May 1998, Judy Koehler was appointed to the Illinois Appellate Court by Illinois Supreme Court Justice James Heiple, to fill the vacancy of Michael McCuskey, who had become a federal judge. She narrowly defeated appellate attorney Karen Kendall of Princeville and law professor Michael Closen of Lockport in the Republican primary garnering 34.17% of the vote to Kendall's 33.23% and Closen's 32.60%. In that year's general election, she lost to Democratic candidate Mary McDade.

== Electoral history ==
- Illinois House of Representatives District 45 Republican primary, 1980
  - Judy Koehler, 40,481, 52%
  - John "Jay" Ackerman, 22,654, 29%
  - Donald Anderson, 14,266, 18%
- Illinois House of Representatives District 45 election, 1980
  - Judy Koehler (R), 92,386, 36%
  - John "Jay" Ackerman (R), 77,403, 30%
  - Joe Ozella, Jr. (D), 51,823, 20%
  - Bernice Jackson (D), 36,946, 14%
- Illinois House of Representatives District 89 Republican primary, 1982
  - Judy Koehler, 9,561, 72%
  - John "Jay" Ackerman, 3,642, 28%
- Illinois House of Representatives District 89 election, 1982
  - Judy Koehler (R), 25,393, 76%
  - Mike McNally (D), 8,105, 24%
- Illinois House of Representatives District 89 election, 1984
  - Judy Koehler (R), 127,475, 100%
- Republican primary for United States Senate in Illinois, 1986
  - Judy Koehler, 266,214, 55%
  - George Ranney, 217,720, 45%
- United States Senate election in Illinois, 1986
  - Alan Dixon (D), 2,033,783, 65%
  - Judy Koehler (R), 1,053,734, 34%
- Illinois's 18th congressional district Republican primary, 1994
  - Ray LaHood, 33,956, 50%
  - Judy Koehler, 26,809, 40%
  - Dennis Lee Higgins, 6,959, 10%
- 3rd District Appellate Court Republican primary, 2000
  - Judy Koehler, 34,945, 34%
  - Karen L. Kendall, 33,981, 33%
  - Michael L. Closen, 33,981, 33%
- 3rd District Appellate Court election, 2000
  - Mary McDade (D), 318,151, 51%
  - Judy Koehler (R), 301,751, 49%

Party political offices
Preceded by Dave O'Neal	Republican nominee for U.S. Senator from Illinois (Class 3); 1986	Succeeded by Richard Williamson
