= Travelers' Century Club =

Nonprofit organization

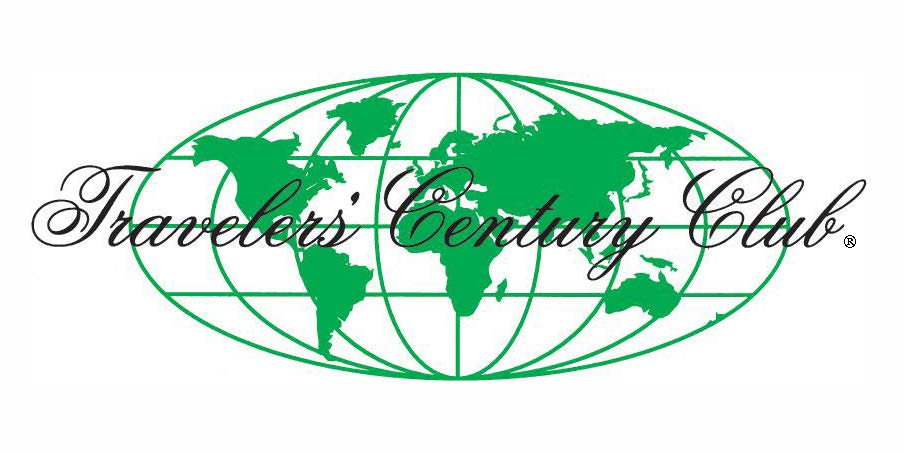
- Founded: 1954
- Location: Los Angeles, California, United States
- Members: 1,400+
- Website: travelerscenturyclub.org

The Travelers' Century Club, or TCC, is a club for people who have visited 100 or more of the world's countries and territories.

The organization was founded in California in 1954 and now has more than 1,400 members throughout the world. The club has twenty-one regional chapters in the United States, and one each in Australia, Canada, China, France, Germany, Korea, Spain, and the United Kingdom. It holds regular meetings and provides other tools for social networking.

== Membership eligibility and the list ==
The TCC maintains a list of countries and territories by which initial membership and milestone recognition are determined. The list includes not only sovereign states but also certain territories, exclaves and island groups. As of January 2022, the list contains 330 such countries and territories. The club literature notes that "although some are not actually countries in their own right, they have been included because they are removed from the parent country", based on rules established in 1970. The designation of what qualifies to be on the list is very roughly based on the amateur radio DXCC award criteria for working 100 "entities." Islands which are part of countries are counted separately if they’re more than 200 miles from land or have a population exceeding 100,000 and are administered as distinctively separate state(s), province(s), or department(s). Under these criteria, the large Canadian island of Newfoundland (with a population of 500,000) doesn't qualify, as it is politically part of Newfoundland and Labrador, a province which is also partially on the Canadian mainland.

The club has no requirements as to how long the traveler must have stayed in a country to qualify. Anyone who has visited 100 or more of the places on the list is eligible to join.

=== Regional classification ===
The 330 countries and territories are categorized under 12 different world regions: Africa, Antarctica, Asia, Atlantic Ocean, Caribbean, Central America, Europe & Mediterranean, Indian Ocean, Middle East, North America, Pacific Ocean and South America.

==== Central America ====
- Belize
- Costa Rica
- El Salvador
- Guatemala
- Honduras
- Nicaragua
- Panama

==== North America ====
- Alaska
- Canada
- Mexico
- Prince Edward Island
- St. Pierre & Miquelon
- United States (Contiguous)

==== South America ====
- Argentina
- Bolivia
- Brazil
- Chile
- Colombia
- Ecuador
- French Guiana
- Guyana
- Nueva Esparta (Margarita Island)
- Paraguay
- Peru
- Suriname
- Uruguay
- Venezuela

==== Antarctica ====
- Argentine Antarctica (Antarctic Peninsula)
- Australian Antarctic Territory (Davis, Heard, Macquarie, Mawson)
- British Antarctic Territory (Antarctic Peninsula, Graham Land, South Orkney, South Shetland)
- Chilean Antarctic Territory (Antarctic Peninsula)
- French Antarctica (Adélie, Kerguelen)
- New Zealand Antarctica (Ross Dependency)
- Norwegian Dependencies (Bouvet, Peter I Island, Queen Maud Land)

==== Africa ====
- Algeria
- Angola
- Benin
- Botswana
- Burkina Faso
- Burundi
- Angola
- Cameroon
- Central African Republic
- Chad
- Congo, Democratic Republic of (Kinshasa)
- Congo, Republic of (Brazzaville)
- Côte d’Ivoire (Ivory Coast)
- Djibouti
- Egypt in Africa
- Equatorial Guinea (Bioko)
- Equatorial Guinea (Rio Muni)
- Eritrea
- Eswatini (Swaziland)
- Ethiopia
- Gabon
- Gambia, The
- Ghana
- Guinea
- Guinea-Bissau
- Kenya
- Lesotho
- Liberia
- Libya
- Malawi
- Mali
- Mauritania
- Morocco
- Morocco, Spanish (Ceuta, Melilla)
- Mozambique
- Namibia
- Niger
- Nigeria
- Rwanda
- Sao Tome & Principe
- Senegal
- Sierra Leone
- Somalia (Italian Somaliland)
- Somaliland (British)
- South Africa
- South Sudan
- Sudan
- Tanzania
- Togo
- Tunisia
- Uganda
- Western Sahara
- Zambia
- Zanzibar
- Zimbabwe

==== Asia ====
- Abkhazia
- Afghanistan
- Armenia
- Azerbaijan
- Bangladesh
- Bhutan
- Brunei
- Cambodia
- China, People’s Republic
- Georgia
- Hainan Island
- Hong Kong
- India
- Indonesia (Java)
- Japan
- Jeju Island (South Korea)
- Kalimantan (Indonesian Borneo)
- Kashmir
- Kazakhstan
- Korea, North
- Korea, South
- Kyrgyzstan
- Laos
- Lesser Sunda Islands (Bali, Timor, Indonesia)
- Macau
- Malaysia
- Maluku Islands
- Mongolia, Republic
- Myanmar (Burma)
- Nakhchivan
- Nepal
- Pakistan
- Papua (Irian Jaya)
- Philippines
- Russia in Asia (incl. Siberia)
- Sabah (North Borneo)
- Sarawak
- Sikkim
- Singapore
- South Ossetia
- Sri Lanka (Ceylon)
- Sulawesi (Celebes, Indonesia)
- Sumatra (Indonesia)
- Taiwan. R.O.C.
- Tajikistan
- Thailand
- Tibet
- Timor-Leste
- Turkey in Asia (Anatolia, Ankara, Izmir)
- Turkmenistan
- Uzbekistan
- Vietnam

==== Middle East ====
- Abu Dhabi
- Ajman
- Bahrain
- Dubai
- Egypt in Asia (Sinai Peninsula)
- Fujairah
- Iran
- Iraq
- Israel
- Jordan
- Kuwait
- Lebanon
- Oman
- Palestine
- Qatar
- Ras Al Khaimah
- Saudi Arabia
- Sharjah
- Syria
- Umm Al Qaiwain
- Yemen

==== Europe & Mediterranean ====
- Aland Islands
- Albania
- Andorra
- Austria
- Balearic Islands (Ibiza, Mallorca, Minorca)
- Belarus
- Belgium
- Bosnia & Herzegovina
- Bulgaria
- Corsica
- Crete
- Croatia
- Cyprus, British Sovereign Base Areas of Akrotiri & Dhekelia
- Cyprus, Republic
- Cyprus, Turkish Fed. State
- Czech Republic
- Denmark
- England
- Estonia
- Finland
- France
- Germany
- Gibraltar
- Greece
- Greek Aegean Islands (Cyclades, Dodecanese, Northern Aegean Islands)
- Guernsey & Dependencies (Alderney, Herm, Sark)
- Hungary
- Ionian Islands (Corfu, etc.)
- Ireland (Eire)
- Ireland, Northern
- Isle of Man
- Italy
- Jersey
- Kaliningrad
- Kosovo
- Lampedusa
- Latvia
- Liechtenstein
- Lithuania
- Luxembourg
- Malta
- Moldova
- Monaco
- Montenegro
- Netherlands
- North Macedonia
- Norway
- Poland
- Portugal
- Romania
- Russia
- San Marino
- Sardinia
- Scotland
- Serbia
- Sicily
- Slovakia
- Slovenia
- Spain
- Spitsbergen (Svalbard, Bear Island)
- Srpska
- Sweden
- Switzerland
- Transnistria (Pridnestrovie)
- Turkey in Europe (Istanbul)
- Ukraine
- Vatican City
- Wales

==== Atlantic Ocean ====
- Ascension
- Azores Islands
- Bermuda
- Canary Islands
- Cape Verde Islands
- Falkland Islands
- Faroe Islands
- Fernando de Noronha
- Greenland (Kalaallit Nunaat)
- Iceland
- Madeira
- South Georgia & the South Sandwich Islands
- St. Helena
- Tristan da Cunha

==== Caribbean ====
- Anguilla
- Antigua & Barbuda
- Aruba
- Bahamas
- Barbados
- Bonaire
- Cayman Islands
- Cuba
- Curacao
- Dominica
- Dominican Republic
- Grenada & Dependencies (Carriacou, Grenadines
- Guadeloupe & Dependencies (Marie Galante)
- Haiti
- Jamaica
- Martinique
- Montserrat
- Nevis
- Puerto Rico
- Saba & Sint Eustatius
- St. Barthélemy
- St. Kitts
- St. Lucia
- St. Martin (France)
- St. Vincent & the Grenadines
- San Andrés & Providencia
- Sint Maarten (Netherlands)
- Trinidad & Tobago
- Turks & Caicos Islands
- Virgin Islands, British (Tortola, etc.)
- Virgin Islands, U.S. (St. Croix, St. John, St. Thomas)

==== Indian Ocean ====
- Andaman-Nicobar Islands
- British Indian Ocean Territory (Chagos Archipelago, Diego Garcia)
- Christmas Island
- Cocos (Keeling) Islands
- Comoros (Anjouan, Grand Comoro, Moheli)
- Lakshadweep
- Madagascar
- Maldives
- Mauritius & Dependencies (Agalega, St. Brandon)
- Mayotte (Dzaoudzi)
- Reunion
- Rodrigues Island
- Seychelles
- Socotra
- Zil Elwannyen Sesel (Aldabra, Amirante Islands, Farquhar)

==== Pacific Ocean ====
- Austral Islands
- Australia
- Chatham Islands
- Cook Islands (Aitutaki, Penrhyn, Rarotonga)
- Easter Island
- Fiji Islands
- French Polynesia (Gambier, Tahiti, Tuamotu)
- Galapagos Islands
- Guam
- Hawaiian Islands
- Juan Fernandez Islands (Robinson Crusoe Island)
- Kiribati (Gilberts, Tarawa, Ocean Island)
- Line/Phoenix Islands (Canton, Christmas, Enderbury, Fanning)
- Lord Howe Island
- Marquesas Islands
- Marshall Islands, Republic of (Eniwetok, Kwajalein, Majuro)
- Micronesia, Federated States of (Caroline Islands, Chuuk, Kosrae, Pohnpei, Yap)
- Midway Island
- Nauru
- New Caledonia & Dependencies (L’Île-des-Pins, Loyalty Islands)
- New Zealand
- Niue
- Norfolk Island
- Northern Marianas (Saipan, Tinian)
- Ogasawara (Bonin, Iwo Jima, Volcano Island)
- Palau, Republic of
- Papua New Guinea
- Papua New Guinea – Islands Region (Admiralty Islands, Bougainville, New Britain, New Ireland)
- Pitcairn Island
- Ryukyu Islands (Okinawa)
- Samoa, American
- Samoa
- Solomon Islands
- Tasmania
- Tokelau Islands (Atafu, Fakaofu, Union)
- Tonga (Nukualofa)
- Tuvalu (Ellice Island, Funafuti, Vaitapu)
- Vanuatu (New Hebrides Islands)
- Wake Island
- Wallis & Futuna Islands

== Records ==
- By 2018, twenty-four members had visited every place on the list. John Clouse, from Evansville, Indiana, was the first to travel to all of the organization's listed countries and was recognized by the 1995 Guinness World Records as "the world's most traveled man" taking the title from another TCC Club member Parke G. Thompson.
- The youngest to join the club was Lani Shea, whose parents Jeff and Novita from Novato, California, reported that she reached her 100th country at an age of two years and eight months. She also set a new Guinness World Record under the category of "Youngest person to travel to all seven continents", accomplished in December 2003 when she was two years and 307 days. The record is currently held by Vaidehi Thirrupathy.

== Controversies ==
In 2004, club member Charles Veley was featured in the UK's The Daily Telegraph as the new holder of the Guinness world record for World's Most Travelled Man, but this was never reflected in the Guinness Book of World Records. Instead Guinness retired the category citing lack of an objective standard for the title. Some world travelers dispute Veley's claim to be the new World's Most Traveled Man.

== Notable members ==
- Babis Bizas, Greek travel writer and tour operator
- David L. Cunningham, international filmmaker
- Richard Foltz, Canadian scholar
- Don Parrish, American adventurer
