= Papadimitriou =

Papadimitriou or Papademetriou (Greek: Παπαδημητρίου) is a Greek surname that may refer to:

- Alexandros Papadimitriou (born 1973), Greek Olympic hammer thrower
- Babis Papadimitriou (born 1954), Greek journalist, news analyst, economist and commentator
- Christos Papadimitriou (born 1949), Greek computer scientist
- Dimitri B. Papadimitriou (born 1946), Greek economist
- Elsa Papadimitriou (1942–2022), Greek politician
- Justin Peter Papadimitriou (born 1977), Canadian drummer
- Lefteris Papadimitriou (fl. 21st century), Greek composer
- Lisa Papademetriou (born 1971), American author of young adult fiction
- Nicholas Papademetriou (fl. 21st century), Australian actor of Greek Cypriot descent
- Thodoros Papadimitriou (1931–2018), Greek sculptor
