= 1986 United States Senate election in Illinois =

- November 4, 1986
- Turnout: 52.01%
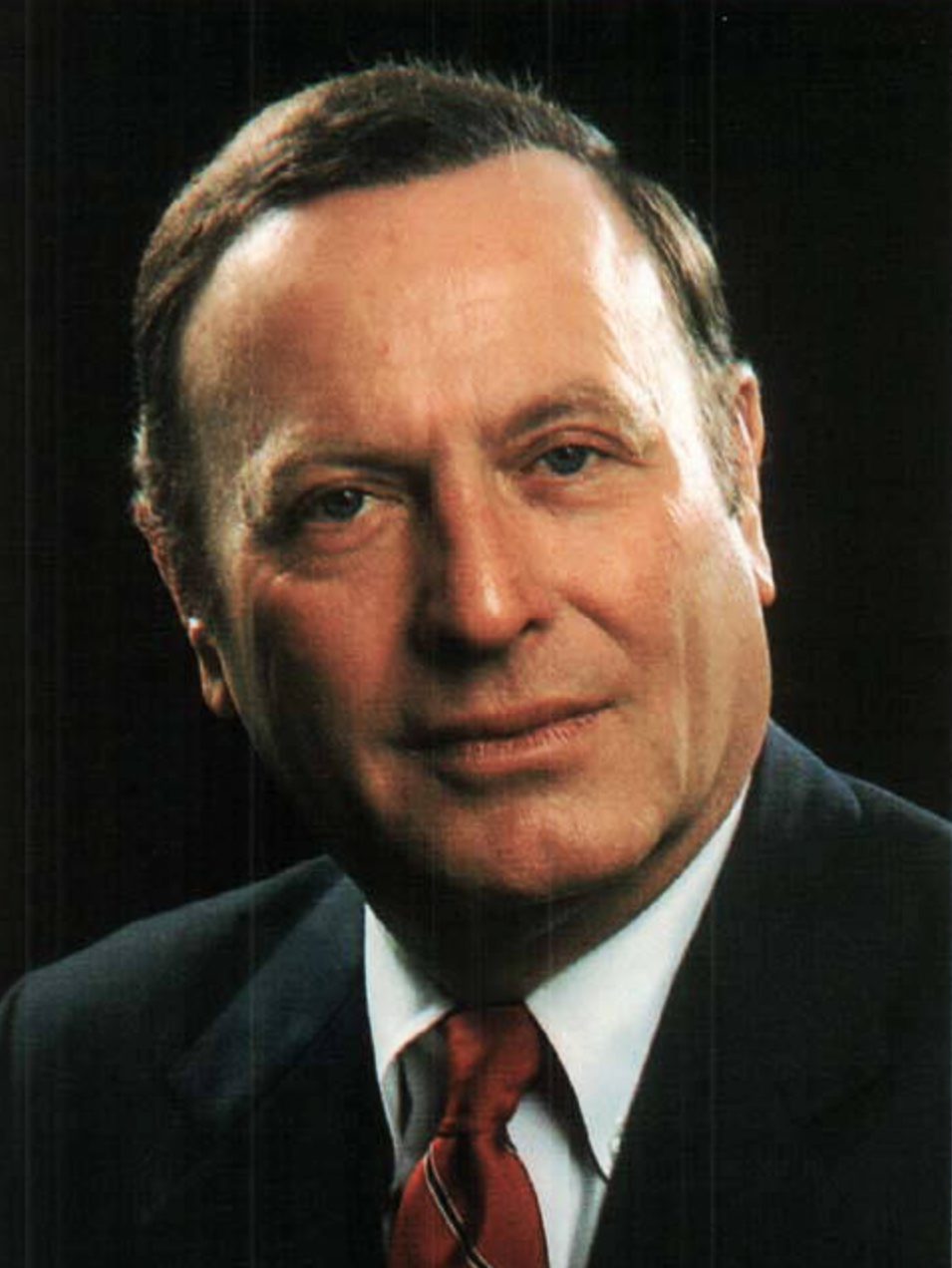

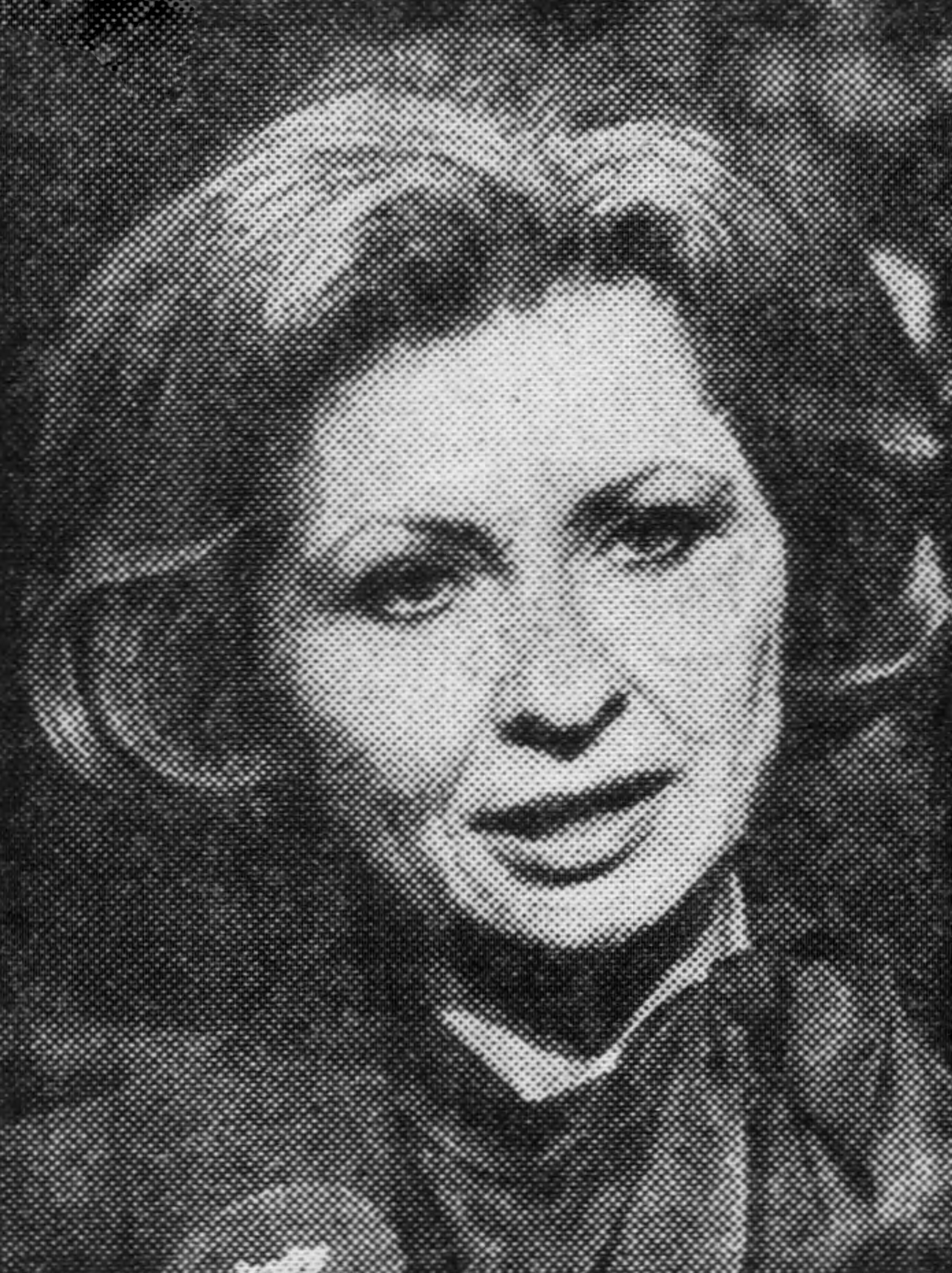
Nominee	Alan Dixon	Judy Koehler
Party	Democratic	Republican
Popular vote	2,033,783	1,053,734
Percentage	65.13%	33.74%
- Dixon: 40–50% 50–60% 60–70% 70–80% 80–90% <90% Koehler: 40–50% 50–60% 60–70% 70–80% 80–90%
U.S. senator before election
Alan J. Dixon
Democratic
Elected U.S. Senator
Alan J. Dixon
Democratic

The 1986 United States Senate election in Illinois was held on November 4, 1986. The incumbent Democrat U.S. Senator Alan J. Dixon won re-election to a second term. Until 2022, this was the most recent election in which an incumbent Senator won re-election to Illinois' Class 3 seat and was elected to more than one full term.

Primaries were held March 18, 1986.

== Background ==
The primaries and general elections coincided with those for House, as well as those for state offices.

For the primaries, the turnout was 21.84%, with 1,333,989 votes were cast.

For the general election, turnout was 52.01%, with 3,122,833 votes cast.

== Democratic primary ==
=== Candidates ===
- Alan J. Dixon, incumbent U.S. Senator
- Sheila Jones, perennial candidate

=== Results ===
Democratic primary
Party	Candidate	Votes	%
Democratic	Alan J. Dixon (incumbent)	720,571	84.77
Democratic	Sheila Jones	129,474	15.23
Write-in	Others	4	0.00
Total votes		850,049	100

== Republican primary ==
=== Candidates ===
- Judy Koehler, state representative
- George Ranney, executive at Inland Steel Company

=== Withdrew ===
- Tom Corcoran, former congressman (1977–1985)

Republican primary
Party	Candidate	Votes	%
Republican	Judy Koehler	266,214	55.01
Republican	George Ranney	217,720	44.99
Write-in	Others	6	0.00
Total votes		483,940	100

== General election ==
Dixon easily won the senate race. Koehler fared poorly throughout most parts of the state, only winning 10 of the state's 102 counties.

Koehler's campaign was regarded as underfinanced.

Illinois United States Senate election, 1986
Party	Candidate	Votes	%	±%
Democratic	Alan J. Dixon (incumbent)	2,033,783	65.13%	+9.12%
Republican	Judy Koehler	1,053,734	33.74%	−8.76%
Illinois Solidarity	Einar V. Dyhrkopp	15,804	0.51%	
Libertarian	Donald M. Parrish, Jr.	13,891	0.44%	−0.20%
Socialist Workers	Omari Musa	5,671	0.18%	+0.12%
Total votes		3,122,833	100	
Democratic hold		Swing		

== See also ==
- 1986 United States Senate elections
