= Don Parrish (adventurer) =

American adventurer (born 1944)

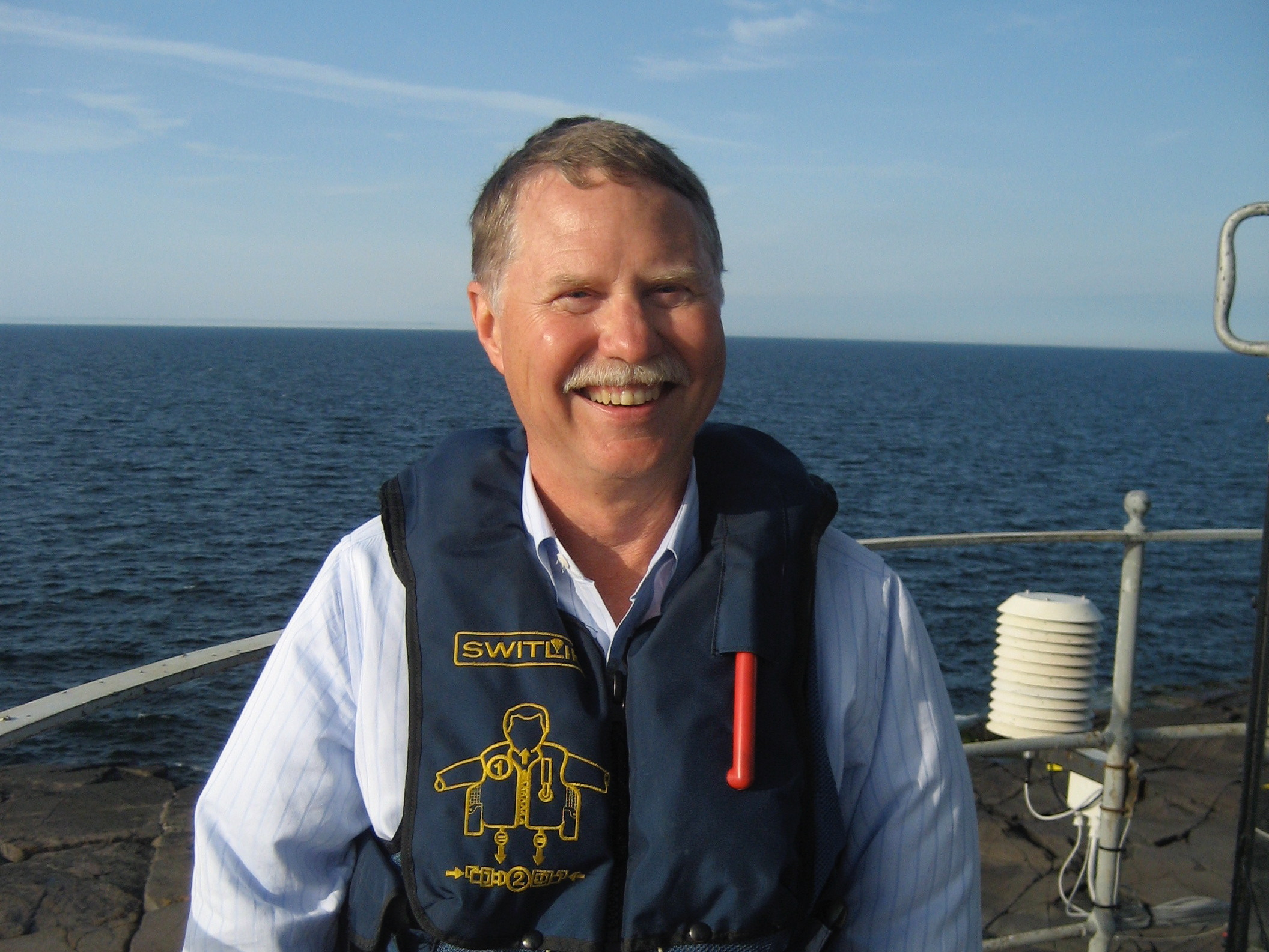
- Parrish in 2007
- Born: Donald Maltby Parrish Jr. October 27, 1944 (age 81); Washington, D.C., U.S.
- Citizenship: American
- Known for: Adventure

Donald Maltby Parrish Jr. (born October 27, 1944) is an American adventurer and former technical manager at AT&T Bell Laboratories.

== Early life and education ==
Donald Maltby Parrish Jr. was born on October 27, 1944 in Washington, D.C. to Donald Maltby Parrish and Herdis Borgny Anderson. He grew up in Iowa and Dallas, and he graduated from W.W. Samuell High School in 1962. He graduated from the University of Texas in June 1966 with a Bachelor of Arts degree in mathematics. In June 1968, he graduated from the University of Chicago with a Master of Science degree in Computer Science.

== Career ==
Parrish began working for Bell Labs in 1966. Six years later, in 1972, he transferred to Illinois Bell. During his tenure, AT&T decided to sell its Electronic Switching Systems overseas in 1977. Parrish ultimately retired in 2001 at age 51.

== Travel ==
Parrish has visited all 193 United Nations member states.

In 1965, at age 20, he spent the summer in West Germany, working in a metal factory in Hanau. Parrish purchased an old motorcycle and lived in a room in the home of a German family. By 1969, he had traveled through the Soviet Union and Eastern Europe during the Cold War. He made his first trip around the world in 1971.

In 1983, Parrish completed his visit to all 50 U.S. states. By 2011, at age 66, he had visited all United Nations member states, concluding with Mongolia. Parrish had also visited the South Pole on the 100th anniversary of Roald Amundsen's Expedition of 1911.

In November 2013, Parrish visited Conway Reef, located approximately 280 miles away from the main islands of Fiji. According to the Most Traveled People website, he was ranked number one on their list at that time. In February 2017, he completed the Travelers' Century Club list of 325 countries, becoming the 26th person to do so.

As of July 2022, Parrish had visited 937 of the 1,013 locations on the Most Traveled People list, maintaining the top rank. He has also traveled to North Korea, including visits to a war museum and monuments dedicated to Kim Il Sung. During this trip, Parrish was selected by his group to place flowers at the grave of Kim Il Sung’s wife, Kim Jong-suk.

Parrish has been profiled as one of the top adventurers by Daily Herald, BBC, and Die Zeit. He has been featured in: Chicago Tribune, NBC , Daily Herald, Emirates Airlines magazine, The Daily Telegraph and CBS Radio.

== Personal life ==
Parrish is unmarried with no childrenand lives in the suburbs of Chicago.

Parrish is a co-founder of the Libertarian Party of Illinois. He was the Libertarian Party candidate for the United States Senate election in Illinois, 1986.

== Accomplishments ==
- Parrish holds a US patent for dynamic network automatic call distribution.

== Awards ==
- Parrish received the ETIC Award for 2018, presented to him during the "Extreme Traveler International Congress."
- Parrish was awarded by the Travelers' Century Club president on March 11, 2017, for completing the TCC travel list of 325 countries. The award includes an engraved plaque on a pedestal of European crystal and a globe that rotates by solar power.
- In 2015, BBC Travel named Parrish as one of six travel pioneers for 2015.
