= Babish =

Babish may refer to:

- Oliver Babish, a character in The West Wing
- Babish Culinary Universe, a YouTube cooking channel
- Professor and Anne Babish, characters in 2-Headed Shark Attack

== See also ==
- Babis
