= Babis Angourakis =

Greek politician (1951–2014)

Charalambos 'Babis' Angourakis (19 January 1951 – 12 May 2014) was a Greek politician and MEP for the Communist Party of Greece (KKE). He was elected as an MP for the KKE in the Athens A constituency in 1997–2000 and represented the party in the European Parliament from 2009 till his death.

He was born Bucharest, Romania in 1951. His father G. Angourakis (Psiloreitis) was likewise a member of KKE. In 1968, he moved with his family to the German Democratic Republic.

He graduated from Dresden University of Technology in 1971 with a Doctorate in Computer Science. He worked as an assistant there in the computer faculty in 1973–1978.

From 1975 to 1985, he was a member of the Greek Communist Youth Central Council, before joining the KKE in 1985.

In 1997, he was elected as member of the Greek Parliament and was in office from 1997 to 2000.

Babis was married to Georgia and they had two children. He died on 12 May 2014 from an aortic dissection, after major heart surgery in the intensive care unit of Onassis Cardiac Surgery Center.
