= Vasilios Babis =

Greek footballer

Personal information
- Full name: Vasilios Babis
- Date of birth: 22 October 1996 (age 30)
- Place of birth: Heraklion, Crete, Greece
- Height: 1.72 m (5 ft 8 in)
- Position: Left-back

Youth career
- OFI

Senior career*
Years	Team	Apps	(Gls)
2015–2017	OFI	0	(0)
2015–2016	→ Krousonas (loan)		
2016–2017	→ Irodotos (loan)		
2017–2019	Irodotos		
2019–2020	Ierapetra	15	(0)
- * Club domestic league appearances and goals as of 10 August 2020

Vasilios Babis (Greek: Βασίλειος Μπάμπης; born 22 October 1996) is a Greek professional footballer who plays as a left-back.

== Honours ==
Irodotos

- Heraklion FCA Championship: 2016–17
- Heraklion FCA Cup: 2016–17
- Greek Amateur Cup: 2016–17
- Greek Amateurs' Super Cup: 2016–17
