= Jay Ackerman =

American politician

John C. "Jay" Ackerman (November 23, 1933 – July 23, 2007) was an American farmer and politician.

He served on the Morton Park Commission from 1967 to 1975. Ackerman also served on the Tazewell County Board from 1972 to 1978. Ackerman served in the Illinois House of Representatives from 1979 to 1983 and from 1987 to 1999. He was a Republican. Ackerman served on the Governor's Board of Agriculture Advisers from 1984 to 1987. Ackerman died in an accident on his farm in Morton, Illinois; when cutting grass on a sloping surface near a small lake on his farm, he and his lawn mower toppled over and pinned him in the water.

== Early life and education ==
Born in Morton, Illinois, Ackerman served in the United States Army from 1956 to 1958. He studied agriculture at the University of Illinois at Urbana–Champaign and was a farmer.
