= Babis Papadimitriou =

Greek journalist, news analyst, economist and commentator

Babis Papadimitriou (born 1954) is a Greek journalist, news analyst, economist and commentator at Skai TV and Skai 100.3 radio station. He was elected a Greek MP at the 2019 Greek legislative election with New Democracy. He is a lead economic and political analyst at Skai TV, a Greek broadcast channel. He is also a columnist at Kathimerini newspaper.

== Life ==
Papadimitriou was born in Athens in 1954. He graduated from the Fifth Gymnasium of Exarchia. He obtained a degree in economics from Paris X Nanterre (1979) followed by a master's degree in "money and finance" from the same university (1981). He earned a second master's degree, in economic history, at the School for Advanced Studies in the Social Sciences, again in Paris.

He worked as an economist, at the Ministry of Finance (Greece) and with many banks such as the Bank of Greece, Emporiki Bank and Eurobank EFG. Papadimitriou has two daughters.

Papadimitriou was an active media commentator about the Greek debt crisis.
