= Babis Bizas =

Greek writer

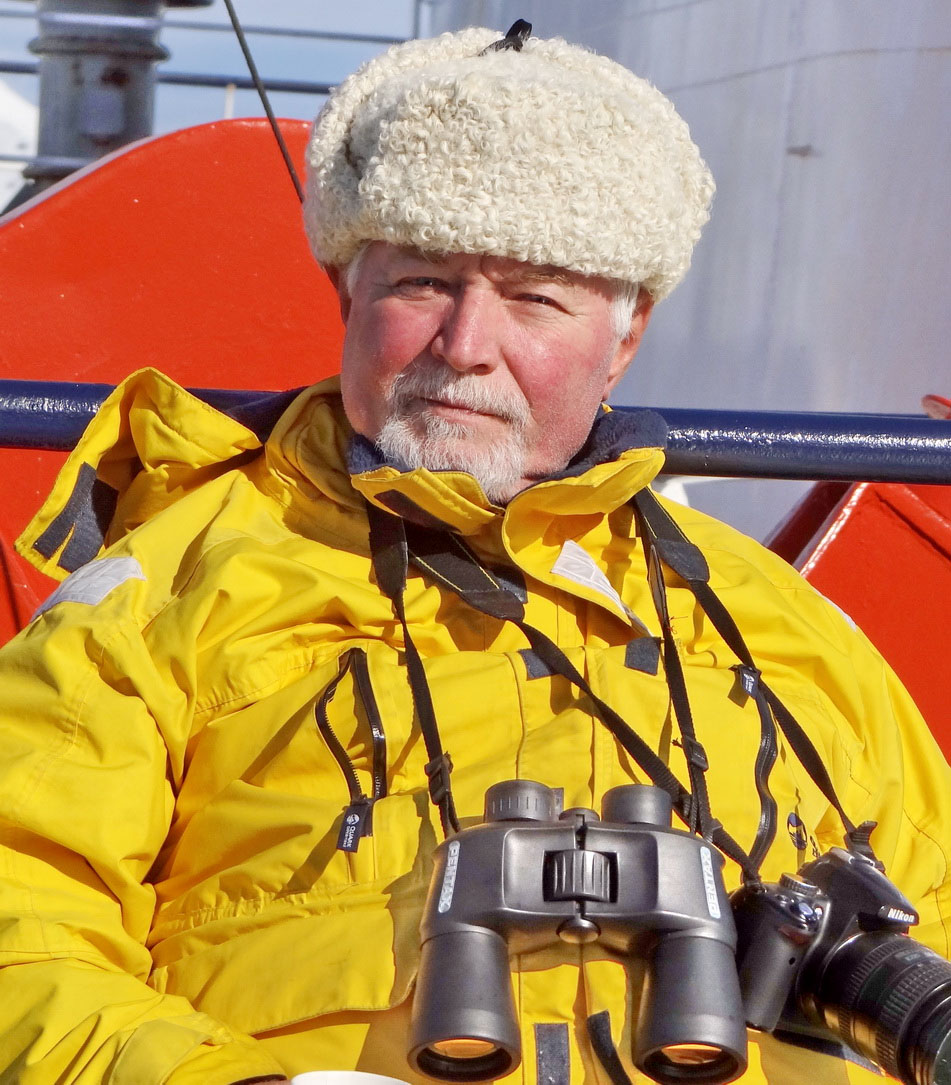
- Babis Bizas in 2012
- Born: Charalampos Bizas; 16 September 1954 (age 71); Arta, Epirus, Greece
- Known for: The most traveled man on Earth
- Website: babisbizas.com

Babis Bizas (born Charalampos Bizas; 16 September 1954) is a Greek travel writer, explorer, and geographer. He participated in an expedition to the North Pole in May 1996, and 18 years later, in December 2014, he landed on the South Pole, thus probably becoming the only Greek to have visited both Poles. By 2004 Bizas had visited all 193 sovereign countries of the world. He is currently a member of the RGO (Russian Geographic Society).

== Recognitions ==
"The most traveled man on Earth".

== Early life ==
He studied political sciences at the Panteion University of Social and Political Sciences in Athens and Slavonic languages in the Institute for Balkan Studies in Thessaloniki, where he learned Bulgarian and Russian. As a university student, he travelled as backpacker in Europe mostly hitchhiking and in 1977 he followed the stream of the young European travelers.

== Books ==
Babis Bizas has written two travel books. The "Russia" Guide and the "Geographic Guide for Travelers"
