= List of United States representatives in the 75th Congress =

This is a complete list of United States representatives during the 75th United States Congress listed by seniority.

As an historical article, the districts and party affiliations listed reflect those during the 75th Congress (January 3, 1937 – January 3, 1939). Seats and party affiliations on similar lists for other congresses will be different for certain members.

Seniority depends on the date on which members were sworn into office. Since many members are sworn in on the same day, subsequent ranking is based on previous congressional service of the individual and then by alphabetical order by the last name of the representative.

Committee chairmanship in the House is often associated with seniority. However, party leadership is typically not associated with seniority.

Note: The "*" indicates that the representative/delegate may have served one or more non-consecutive terms while in the House of Representatives of the United States Congress.

== U.S. House seniority list ==
U.S. House seniority
Rank	Representative	Party	District	Seniority date (previous service, if any)	No. of term(s)	Notes
1	Adolph J. Sabath	D	IL-05	March 4, 1907	16th term	Dean of the House
2	Edward T. Taylor	D	CO-04	March 4, 1909	15th term	
3	Robert L. Doughton	D	NC-09	March 4, 1911	14th term	
4	Carl E. Mapes	R	MI-05	March 4, 1913	13th term	
5	Andrew Jackson Montague	D	VA-03	March 4, 1913	13th term	Died on January 24, 1937.
6	Sam Rayburn	D	TX-04	March 4, 1913	13th term	
7	Hatton W. Sumners	D	TX-05	March 4, 1913	13th term	
8	Allen T. Treadway	R	MA-01	March 4, 1913	13th term	
9	James P. Buchanan	D	TX-10	April 15, 1913	13th term	Died on February 22, 1937.
10	Carl Vinson	D	GA-06	November 3, 1914	13th term	
11	Henry B. Steagall	D	AL-03	March 4, 1915	12th term	
12	George H. Tinkham	R	MA-10	March 4, 1915	12th term	
13	Bertrand Snell	R	NY-31	November 2, 1915	12th term	Left the House in 1939.
14	William B. Bankhead	D	AL-07	March 4, 1917	11th term	Speaker of the House
15	John Marvin Jones	D	TX-18	March 4, 1917	11th term	
16	Harold Knutson	R	MN-06	March 4, 1917	11th term	
17	Clarence F. Lea	D	CA-01	March 4, 1917	11th term	
18	Joseph J. Mansfield	D	TX-09	March 4, 1917	11th term	
19	Christopher D. Sullivan	D	NY-13	March 4, 1917	11th term	
20	S. Otis Bland	D	VA-01	July 2, 1918	11th term	
21	Frank Crowther	R	NY-30	March 4, 1919	10th term	
22	Thomas H. Cullen	D	NY-04	March 4, 1919	10th term	
23	James M. Mead	D	NY-42	March 4, 1919	10th term	Resigned on December 2, 1938.
24	Daniel A. Reed	R	NY-43	March 4, 1919	10th term	
25	J. Will Taylor	R	TN-02	March 4, 1919	10th term	
26	Fritz G. Lanham	D	TX-12	April 19, 1919	10th term	
27	Patrick H. Drewry	D	VA-04	April 27, 1920	10th term	
28	Hamilton Fish Jr.	R	NY-26	November 2, 1920	10th term	
29	William J. Driver	D	AR-01	March 4, 1921	9th term	Left the House in 1939.
30	Hampton P. Fulmer	D	SC-02	March 4, 1921	9th term	
31	Thomas Alan Goldsborough	D	MD-01	March 4, 1921	9th term	
32	John E. Rankin	D	MS-01	March 4, 1921	9th term	
33	Morgan G. Sanders	D	TX-03	March 4, 1921	9th term	Left the House in 1939.
34	Roy O. Woodruff	R	MI-10	March 4, 1921; Previous service, 1913–1915.	10th term*	
35	Charles L. Gifford	R	MA-15	November 7, 1922	9th term	
36	Robert L. Bacon	R	NY-01	March 4, 1923	8th term	Died on September 12, 1938.
37	Sol Bloom	D	NY-19	March 4, 1923	8th term	
38	John J. Boylan	D	NY-15	March 4, 1923	8th term	Died on October 5, 1938.
39	Clarence Cannon	D	MO-09	March 4, 1923	8th term	
40	Emanuel Celler	D	NY-10	March 4, 1923	8th term	
41	William P. Connery Jr.	D	MA-07	March 4, 1923	8th term	Died on June 15, 1937.
42	Robert Crosser	D	OH-21	March 4, 1923; Previous service, 1913–1919.	11th term*	
43	Samuel Dickstein	D	NY-12	March 4, 1923	8th term	
44	Allard H. Gasque	D	SC-06	March 4, 1923	8th term	Died on June 17, 1938.
45	Arthur H. Greenwood	D	IN-07	March 4, 1923	8th term	Left the House in 1939.
46	Luther Alexander Johnson	D	TX-06	March 4, 1923	8th term	
47	Samuel Davis McReynolds	D	TN-03	March 4, 1923	8th term	
48	Milton A. Romjue	D	MO-01	March 4, 1923; Previous service, 1917–1921.	10th term*	
49	George N. Seger	R	NJ-08	March 4, 1923	8th term	
50	John Taber	R	NY-36	March 4, 1923	8th term	
51	Clifton A. Woodrum	D	VA-06	March 4, 1923	8th term	
52	J. Lister Hill	D	AL-02	August 14, 1923	8th term	Resigned on January 11, 1938.
53	John H. Kerr	D	NC-02	November 6, 1923	8th term	
54	John J. O'Connor	D	NY-16	November 6, 1923	8th term	Left the House in 1939.
55	Stephen Warfield Gambrill	D	MD-05	November 4, 1924	8th term	Resigned on December 19, 1938.
56	Albert E. Carter	R	CA-06	March 4, 1925	7th term	
57	Edward E. Cox	D	GA-02	March 4, 1925	7th term	
58	Charles Aubrey Eaton	R	NJ-05	March 4, 1925	7th term	
59	Robert A. Green	D	FL-02	March 4, 1925	7th term	
60	Thomas A. Jenkins	R	OH-10	March 4, 1925	7th term	
61	Joseph W. Martin Jr.	R	MA-14	March 4, 1925	7th term	
62	Thomas S. McMillan	D	SC-01	March 4, 1925	7th term	
63	Mary Teresa Norton	D	NJ-13	March 4, 1925	7th term	
64	Andrew Lawrence Somers	D	NY-06	March 4, 1925	7th term	
65	Lloyd Thurston	R	IA-05	March 4, 1925	7th term	Left the House in 1939.
66	Lindsay Carter Warren	D	NC-01	March 4, 1925	7th term	
67	William Madison Whittington	D	MS-03	March 4, 1925	7th term	
68	Edith Nourse Rogers	R	MA-05	June 30, 1925	7th term	
69	Harry Lane Englebright	R	CA-02	August 31, 1926	7th term	
70	Richard J. Welch	R	CA-05	August 31, 1926	7th term	
71	John J. Cochran	D	MO-13	November 2, 1926	7th term	
72	James M. Fitzpatrick	D	NY-24	March 4, 1927	6th term	
73	Wilburn Cartwright	D	OK-03	March 4, 1927	6th term	
74	Ulysses Samuel Guyer	R	KS-02	March 4, 1927; Previous service, 1924–1925.	7th term*	
75	Clifford R. Hope	R	KS-07	March 4, 1927	6th term	
76	Jed Johnson	D	OK-06	March 4, 1927	6th term	
77	Vincent Luke Palmisano	D	MD-03	March 4, 1927	6th term	Left the House in 1939.
78	William I. Sirovich	D	NY-14	March 4, 1927	6th term	
79	Malcolm C. Tarver	D	GA-07	March 4, 1927	6th term	
80	Charles A. Wolverton	R	NJ-01	March 4, 1927	6th term	
81	René L. De Rouen	D	LA-07	August 23, 1927	6th term	
82	Clarence E. Hancock	R	NY-35	November 8, 1927	6th term	
83	Francis D. Culkin	R	NY-32	November 6, 1928	6th term	
84	John William McCormack	D	MA-12	November 6, 1928	6th term	
85	Richard B. Wigglesworth	R	MA-13	November 6, 1928	6th term	
86	James Wolfenden	R	PA-08	November 6, 1928	6th term	
87	J. Bayard Clark	D	NC-07	March 4, 1929	5th term	
88	Jere Cooper	D	TN-08	March 4, 1929	5th term	
89	Wall Doxey	D	MS-02	March 4, 1929	5th term	
90	Claude A. Fuller	D	AR-03	March 4, 1929	5th term	Left the House in 1939.
91	Fred A. Hartley	R	NJ-10	March 4, 1929	5th term	
92	William P. Lambertson	R	KS-01	March 4, 1929	5th term	
93	Louis Ludlow	D	IN-12	March 4, 1929	5th term	
94	Wright Patman	D	TX-01	March 4, 1929	5th term	
95	Joe L. Smith	D	WV-06	March 4, 1929	5th term	
96	Robert Ramspeck	D	GA-05	October 2, 1929	5th term	
97	Paul John Kvale	R	MN-07	October 16, 1929	5th term	Left the House in 1939.
98	Joseph A. Gavagan	D	NY-21	November 5, 1929	5th term	
99	J. Roland Kinzer	R	PA-10	January 28, 1930	5th term	
100	Martin J. Kennedy	D	NY-18	April 11, 1930	5th term	
101	Franklin Wills Hancock Jr.	D	NC-05	November 4, 1930	5th term	Left the House in 1939.
102	Claude V. Parsons	D	IL-24	November 4, 1930	5th term	
103	Michael Reilly	D	WI-06	November 4, 1930; Previous service, 1913–1917.	7th term*	Left the House in 1939.
104	Robert F. Rich	R	PA-16	November 4, 1930	5th term	
105	Walter G. Andrews	R	NY-40	March 4, 1931	4th term	
106	Harry P. Beam	D	IL-04	March 4, 1931	4th term	
107	John W. Boehne Jr.	D	IN-08	March 4, 1931	4th term	
108	Gerald J. Boileau	P	WI-07	March 4, 1931	4th term	Left the House in 1939.
109	Patrick J. Boland	D	PA-11	March 4, 1931	4th term	
110	Alfred L. Bulwinkle	D	NC-10	March 4, 1931; Previous service, 1921–1929.	8th term*	
111	Thomas G. Burch	D	VA-05	March 4, 1931	4th term	
112	Virgil Chapman	D	KY-07	March 4, 1931; Previous service, 1925–1929.	6th term*	
113	William Purington Cole Jr.	D	MD-02	March 4, 1931; Previous service, 1927–1929.	5th term*	
114	Eugene B. Crowe	D	IN-09	March 4, 1931	4th term	
115	Martin Dies Jr.	D	TX-02	March 4, 1931	4th term	
116	Wesley Ernest Disney	D	OK-01	March 4, 1931	4th term	
117	Joachim O. Fernández	D	LA-01	March 4, 1931	4th term	
118	John W. Flannagan Jr.	D	VA-09	March 4, 1931	4th term	
119	Fred C. Gilchrist	R	IA-08	March 4, 1931	4th term	
120	Glenn Griswold	D	IN-05	March 4, 1931	4th term	Left the House in 1939.
121	Harry L. Haines	D	PA-22	March 4, 1931	4th term	Left the House in 1939.
122	Byron B. Harlan	D	OH-03	March 4, 1931	4th term	Left the House in 1939.
123	Pehr G. Holmes	R	MA-04	March 4, 1931	4th term	
124	Edward A. Kelly	D	IL-03	March 4, 1931	4th term	
125	Kent E. Keller	D	IL-25	March 4, 1931	4th term	
126	Frank C. Kniffin	D	OH-05	March 4, 1931	4th term	Left the House in 1939.
127	Walter Lambeth	D	NC-08	March 4, 1931	4th term	Left the House in 1939.
128	Arthur P. Lamneck	D	OH-12	March 4, 1931	4th term	
129	William Larrabee	D	IN-11	March 4, 1931	4th term	
130	David John Lewis	D	MD-06	March 4, 1931; Previous service, 1911–1917.	7th term*	Left the House in 1939.
131	Paul H. Maloney	D	LA-02	March 4, 1931	4th term	
132	Andrew J. May	D	KY-06	March 4, 1931	4th term	
133	Charles D. Millard	R	NY-25	March 4, 1931	4th term	Resigned on September 29, 1937.
134	John E. Miller	D	AR-02	March 4, 1931	4th term	Resigned on November 14, 1937.
135	John Ridley Mitchell	D	TN-04	March 4, 1931	4th term	Left the House in 1939.
136	Samuel B. Pettengill	D	IN-03	March 4, 1931	4th term	Left the House in 1939.
137	James G. Polk	D	OH-06	March 4, 1931	4th term	
138	Leonard W. Schuetz	D	IL-07	March 4, 1931	4th term	
139	Joe Shannon	D	MO-05	March 4, 1931	4th term	
140	Howard W. Smith	D	VA-08	March 4, 1931	4th term	
141	Brent Spence	D	KY-05	March 4, 1931	4th term	
142	William H. Sutphin	D	NJ-03	March 4, 1931	4th term	
143	R. Ewing Thomason	D	TX-16	March 4, 1931	4th term	
144	Fred M. Vinson	D	KY-08	March 4, 1931; Previous service, 1924–1929.	7th term*	Resigned on May 27, 1938.
145	Zebulon Weaver	D	NC-11	March 4, 1931; Previous service, 1917–1919 and 1919–1929.	10th term**	
146	Clyde Williams	D	MO-08	March 4, 1931; Previous service, 1927–1929.	5th term*	
147	Gardner R. Withrow	R	WI-03	March 4, 1931	4th term	Left the House in 1939.
148	Jesse P. Wolcott	R	MI-07	March 4, 1931	4th term	
149	John J. Delaney	D	NY-07	November 3, 1931; Previous service, 1918–1919.	5th term*	
150	Martin L. Sweeney	D	OH-20	November 3, 1931	4th term	
151	Richard M. Kleberg	D	TX-14	November 24, 1931	4th term	
152	Ambrose Jerome Kennedy	D	MD-04	November 8, 1932	4th term	
153	Leo E. Allen	R	IL-13	March 4, 1933	3rd term	
154	Alfred F. Beiter	D	NY-41	March 4, 1933	3rd term	Left the House in 1939.
155	Fred Biermann	D	IA-04	March 4, 1933	3rd term	Left the House in 1939.
156	Frank H. Buck	D	CA-03	March 4, 1933	3rd term	
157	Millard F. Caldwell	D	FL-03	March 4, 1933	3rd term	
158	Raymond Joseph Cannon	D	WI-04	March 4, 1933	3rd term	Left the House in 1939.
159	Charles J. Colden	D	CA-17	March 4, 1933	3rd term	Died on April 15, 1938.
160	William M. Colmer	D	MS-06	March 4, 1933	3rd term	
161	William B. Cravens	D	AR-04	March 4, 1933; Previous service, 1907–1913.	6th term*	
162	Charles N. Crosby	D	PA-29	March 4, 1933	3rd term	Left the House in 1939.
163	Fred N. Cummings	D	CO-02	March 4, 1933	3rd term	
164	Braswell Deen	D	GA-08	March 4, 1933	3rd term	Left the House in 1939.
165	John Dingell Sr.	D	MI-15	March 4, 1933	3rd term	
166	Everett Dirksen	R	IL-16	March 4, 1933	3rd term	
167	J. William Ditter	R	PA-17	March 4, 1933	3rd term	
168	John F. Dockweiler	D	CA-16	March 4, 1933	3rd term	Left the House in 1939.
169	George Anthony Dondero	R	MI-17	March 4, 1933	3rd term	
170	Richard M. Duncan	D	MO-03	March 4, 1933	3rd term	
171	Matthew A. Dunn	D	PA-34	March 4, 1933	3rd term	
172	Edward C. Eicher	D	IA-01	March 4, 1933	3rd term	Resigned on December 2, 1938.
173	Henry Ellenbogen	D	PA-33	March 4, 1933	3rd term	Resigned on January 3, 1938.
174	Charles I. Faddis	D	PA-25	March 4, 1933	3rd term	
175	James I. Farley	D	IN-04	March 4, 1933	3rd term	Left the House in 1939.
176	Thomas B. Fletcher	D	OH-08	March 4, 1933; Previous service, 1925–1929.	5th term*	Left the House in 1939.
177	Benjamin K. Focht	R	PA-18	March 4, 1933; Previous service, 1907–1913 and 1915–1923.	10th term**	Died on March 27, 1937.
178	Thomas F. Ford	D	CA-14	March 4, 1933	3rd term	
179	Philip A. Goodwin	R	NY-27	March 4, 1933	3rd term	Died on June 6, 1937.
180	Finly Hutchinson Gray	D	IN-10	March 4, 1933; Previous service, 1911–1917.	6th term*	Left the House in 1939.
181	Dow W. Harter	D	OH-14	March 4, 1933	3rd term	
182	Arthur Daniel Healey	D	MA-08	March 4, 1933	3rd term	
183	Fred H. Hildebrandt	D	SD-01	March 4, 1933	3rd term	Left the House in 1939.
184	Knute Hill	D	WA-04	March 4, 1933	3rd term	
185	Lawrence E. Imhoff	D	OH-18	March 4, 1933	3rd term	Left the House in 1939.
186	Virginia E. Jenckes	D	IN-06	March 4, 1933	3rd term	Left the House in 1939.
187	George W. Johnson	D	WV-04	March 4, 1933; Previous service, 1923–1925.	4th term*	
188	John Kee	D	WV-05	March 4, 1933	3rd term	
189	Edward Aloysius Kenney	D	NJ-09	March 4, 1933	3rd term	Died on January 27, 1938.
190	Frank Le Blond Kloeb	D	OH-04	March 4, 1933	3rd term	Resigned on August 19, 1937.
191	Charles Kramer	D	CA-13	March 4, 1933	3rd term	
192	Leo Kocialkowski	D	IL-08	March 4, 1933	3rd term	
193	Herman P. Kopplemann	D	CT-01	March 4, 1933	3rd term	Left the House in 1939.
194	William Lemke	R	ND	March 4, 1933	3rd term	
195	John Lesinski Sr.	D	MI-16	March 4, 1933	3rd term	
196	Lawrence Lewis	D	CO-01	March 4, 1933	3rd term	
197	John Andrew Martin	D	CO-03	March 4, 1933; Previous service, 1909–1913.	5th term*	
198	William D. McFarlane	D	TX-13	March 4, 1933	3rd term	Left the House in 1939.
199	John J. McGrath	D	CA-08	March 4, 1933	3rd term	Left the House in 1939.
200	Donald H. McLean	R	NJ-06	March 4, 1933	3rd term	
201	James A. Meeks	D	IL-18	March 4, 1933	3rd term	Left the House in 1939.
202	James W. Mott	R	OR-01	March 4, 1933	3rd term	
203	Abe Murdock	D	UT-01	March 4, 1933	3rd term	
204	Thomas J. O'Brien	D	IL-06	March 4, 1933	3rd term	Left the House in 1939.
205	John Matthew O'Connell	D	RI-02	March 4, 1933	3rd term	Left the House in 1939.
206	Thomas O'Malley	D	WI-05	March 4, 1933	3rd term	Left the House in 1939.
207	Emmett Marshall Owen	D	GA-04	March 4, 1933	3rd term	
208	J. Hardin Peterson	D	FL-01	March 4, 1933	3rd term	
209	Theodore A. Peyser	D	NY-17	March 4, 1933	3rd term	Died on August 8, 1937.
210	Walter M. Pierce	D	OR-02	March 4, 1933	3rd term	
211	D. Lane Powers	R	NJ-04	March 4, 1933	3rd term	
212	Robert L. Ramsay	D	WV-01	March 4, 1933	3rd term	Left the House in 1939.
213	Jennings Randolph	D	WV-02	March 4, 1933	3rd term	
214	B. Carroll Reece	R	TN-01	March 4, 1933; Previous service, 1921–1931.	8th term*	
215	James P. Richards	D	SC-05	March 4, 1933	3rd term	
216	Absalom Willis Robertson	D	VA-07	March 4, 1933	3rd term	
217	J. W. Robinson	D	UT-02	March 4, 1933	3rd term	
218	Will Rogers	D	OK	March 4, 1933	3rd term	
219	George G. Sadowski	D	MI-01	March 4, 1933	3rd term	Left the House in 1939.
220	Edwin M. Schaefer	D	IL-22	March 4, 1933	3rd term	
221	William T. Schulte	D	IN-01	March 4, 1933	3rd term	
222	James G. Scrugham	D	NV	March 4, 1933	3rd term	
223	Robert T. Secrest	D	OH-15	March 4, 1933	3rd term	
224	Martin F. Smith	D	WA-03	March 4, 1933	3rd term	
225	J. Buell Snyder	D	PA-24	March 4, 1933	3rd term	
226	Henry E. Stubbs	D	CA-10	March 4, 1933	3rd term	Died on February 28, 1937.
227	John C. Taylor	D	SC-03	March 4, 1933	3rd term	Left the House in 1939.
228	William R. Thom	D	OH-16	March 4, 1933	3rd term	Left the House in 1939.
229	Chester C. Thompson	D	IL-14	March 4, 1933	3rd term	Left the House in 1939.
230	Charles W. Tobey	R	NH-02	March 4, 1933	3rd term	Left the House in 1939.
231	Clarence W. Turner	D	TN-06	March 4, 1933; Previous service, 1922–1923.	4th term*	
232	William B. Umstead	D	NC-06	March 4, 1933	3rd term	Left the House in 1939.
233	James Wolcott Wadsworth Jr.	R	NY-39	March 4, 1933	3rd term	
234	Monrad Wallgren	D	WA-02	March 4, 1933	3rd term	
235	Francis E. Walter	D	PA-21	March 4, 1933	3rd term	
236	Otha Wearin	D	IA-07	March 4, 1933	3rd term	Left the House in 1939.
237	Compton I. White	D	ID-01	March 4, 1933	3rd term	
238	J. Mark Wilcox	D	FL-04	March 4, 1933	3rd term	Left the House in 1939.
239	Reuben T. Wood	D	MO-06	March 4, 1933	3rd term	
240	Milton H. West	D	TX-15	April 23, 1933	3rd term	
241	Paul Brown	D	GA-10	July 5, 1933	3rd term	
242	Oliver W. Frey	D	PA-09	November 7, 1933	3rd term	Left the House in 1939.
243	Andrew Edmiston Jr.	D	WV-03	November 28, 1933	3rd term	
244	David D. Terry	D	AR-05	December 19, 1933	3rd term	
245	Charles Albert Plumley	R	VT	January 16, 1934	3rd term	
246	Harold D. Cooley	D	NC-04	July 7, 1934	3rd term	
247	Thomas Ryum Amlie	R	WI-01	January 3, 1935; Previous service, 1931–1933.	3rd term*	Left the House in 1939.
248	August H. Andresen	R	MN-01	January 3, 1935; Previous service, 1925–1933.	6th term*	
249	Leslie C. Arends	R	IL-17	January 3, 1935	2nd term	
250	William A. Ashbrook	D	OH-17	January 3, 1935; Previous service, 1907–1921.	9th term*	
251	Graham Arthur Barden	D	NC-03	January 3, 1935	2nd term	
252	C. Jasper Bell	D	MO-04	January 3, 1935	2nd term	
253	Charles Gustav Binderup	R	NE-04	January 3, 1935	2nd term	Left the House in 1939.
254	Owen Brewster	R	ME-03	January 3, 1935	2nd term	
255	Rich T. Buckler	D	MN-09	January 3, 1935	2nd term	
256	Charles A. Buckley	D	NY-23	January 3, 1935	2nd term	
257	Usher Burdick	R	ND	January 3, 1935	2nd term	
258	Frank Carlson	R	KS-06	January 3, 1935	2nd term	
259	Joseph E. Casey	D	MA-03	January 3, 1935	2nd term	
260	Walter Chandler	D	TN-09	January 3, 1935	2nd term	
261	Ralph E. Church	R	IL-10	January 3, 1935	2nd term	
262	David Worth Clark	D	ID-02	January 3, 1935	2nd term	Left the House in 1939.
263	William M. Citron	D	CT	January 3, 1935	2nd term	Left the House in 1939.
264	Harry B. Coffee	D	NE-05	January 3, 1935	2nd term	
265	W. Sterling Cole	R	NY-37	January 3, 1935	2nd term	
266	John M. Costello	D	CA-15	January 3, 1935	2nd term	
267	Fred L. Crawford	R	MI-08	January 3, 1935	2nd term	
268	J. Burrwood Daly	D	PA-04	January 3, 1935	2nd term	
269	John J. Dempsey	D	NM	January 3, 1935	2nd term	
270	Frank J. G. Dorsey	D	PA-05	January 3, 1935	2nd term	Left the House in 1939.
271	Charles R. Eckert	D	PA-26	January 3, 1935	2nd term	Left the House in 1939.
272	Albert J. Engel	D	MI-09	January 3, 1935	2nd term	
273	Marcellus H. Evans	D	NY-05	January 3, 1935	2nd term	
274	Phil Ferguson	D	OK-08	January 3, 1935	2nd term	
275	Aaron L. Ford	D	MS-04	January 3, 1935	2nd term	
276	Bertrand W. Gearhart	R	CA-09	January 3, 1935	2nd term	
277	Bernard J. Gehrmann	P	WI-10	January 3, 1935	2nd term	
278	James H. Gildea	D	PA-13	January 3, 1935	2nd term	Left the House in 1939.
279	Don Hilary Gingery	D	PA-23	January 3, 1935	2nd term	Left the House in 1939.
280	Joseph Anthony Gray	D	PA-27	January 3, 1935	2nd term	Left the House in 1939.
281	Paul Ranous Greever	D	WY	January 3, 1935	2nd term	Left the House in 1939.
282	John W. Gwynne	R	IA-03	January 3, 1935	2nd term	
283	Edward J. Hart	D	NJ-14	January 3, 1935	2nd term	
284	Thomas C. Hennings Jr.	D	MO-11	January 3, 1935	2nd term	
285	John Patrick Higgins	D	MA-11	January 3, 1935	2nd term	Resigned on September 30, 1937.
286	Sam Hobbs	D	AL-04	January 3, 1935	2nd term	
287	Clare Hoffman	R	MI-04	January 3, 1935	2nd term	
288	Frank Eugene Hook	D	MI-12	January 3, 1935	2nd term	
289	John Mills Houston	D	KS-05	January 3, 1935	2nd term	
290	Merlin Hull	R	WI-09	January 3, 1935; Previous service, 1929–1931.	3rd term*	
291	Bert Lord	R	NY-34	January 3, 1935	2nd term	
292	Scott W. Lucas	D	IL-20	January 3, 1935	2nd term	Left the House in 1939.
293	Henry Carl Luckey	D	NE-01	January 3, 1935	2nd term	Left the House in 1939.
294	Melvin Maas	R	MN-04	January 3, 1935; Previous service, 1927–1933.	5th term*	
295	George H. Mahon	D	TX-19	January 3, 1935	2nd term	
296	Sam C. Massingale	D	OK-07	January 3, 1935	2nd term	
297	Maury Maverick	D	TX-20	January 3, 1935	2nd term	Left the House in 1939.
298	James McAndrews	D	IL-09	January 3, 1935; Previous service, 1901–1905 and 1913–1921.	8th term**	
299	John Little McClellan	D	AR-06	January 3, 1935	2nd term	Left the House in 1939.
300	Dan R. McGehee	D	MS-07	January 3, 1935	2nd term	
301	John S. McGroarty	D	CA-11	January 3, 1935	2nd term	Left the House in 1939.
302	Raymond S. McKeough	D	IL-02	January 3, 1935	2nd term	
303	Charles F. McLaughlin	D	NE-02	January 3, 1935	2nd term	
304	Matthew J. Merritt	D	NY	January 3, 1935	2nd term	
305	Earl C. Michener	R	MI-02	January 3, 1935; Previous service, 1919–1933.	9th term*	
306	Arthur W. Mitchell	D	IL-01	January 3, 1935	2nd term	
307	William L. Nelson	D	MO-02	January 3, 1935; Previous service, 1919–1921 and 1925–1933.	7th term**	
308	John Conover Nichols	D	OK-02	January 3, 1935	2nd term	
309	Caroline Love Goodwin O'Day	D	NY	January 3, 1935	2nd term	
310	James A. O'Leary	D	NY-11	January 3, 1935	2nd term	
311	Emmet O'Neal	D	KY-03	January 3, 1935	2nd term	
312	Edward White Patterson	D	KS-03	January 3, 1935	2nd term	Left the House in 1939.
313	Nat Patton	D	TX-07	January 3, 1935	2nd term	
314	Herron C. Pearson	D	TN-07	January 3, 1935	2nd term	
315	Hugh Peterson	D	GA-01	January 3, 1935	2nd term	
316	Joseph L. Pfeifer	D	NY-03	January 3, 1935	2nd term	
317	James L. Quinn	D	PA-31	January 3, 1935	2nd term	Left the House in 1939.
318	Louis C. Rabaut	D	MI-14	January 3, 1935	2nd term	
319	Chauncey W. Reed	R	IL-11	January 3, 1935	2nd term	
320	John M. Robsion	R	KY-09	January 3, 1935; Previous service, 1919–1930.	8th term*	
321	Elmer Ryan	D	MN-02	January 3, 1935	2nd term	
322	Harry Sauthoff	P	WI-02	January 3, 1935	2nd term	Left the House in 1939.
323	George J. Schneider	P	WI-08	January 3, 1935; Previous service, 1923–1933.	7th term*	Left the House in 1939.
324	Byron N. Scott	D	CA-18	January 3, 1935	2nd term	Left the House in 1939.
325	James A. Shanley	D	CT-03	January 3, 1935	2nd term	
326	Dewey Jackson Short	R	MO-07	January 3, 1935; Previous service, 1929–1931.	3rd term*	
327	J. Joseph Smith	D	CT-05	January 3, 1935	2nd term	
328	Charles L. South	D	TX-21	January 3, 1935	2nd term	
329	Michael J. Stack	D	PA-06	January 3, 1935	2nd term	Left the House in 1939.
330	Joe Starnes	D	AL-05	January 3, 1935	2nd term	
331	Karl Stefan	R	NE-03	January 3, 1935	2nd term	
332	John H. Tolan	D	CA-07	January 3, 1935	2nd term	
333	B. Frank Whelchel	D	GA-09	January 3, 1935	2nd term	
334	Orville Zimmerman	D	MO-10	January 3, 1935	2nd term	
335	Charles A. Halleck	R	IN-02	January 29, 1935	2nd term	
336	Frank W. Boykin	D	AL-01	July 30, 1935	2nd term	
337	William Bernard Barry	D	NY-02	November 5, 1935	2nd term	
338	Edward W. Creal	D	KY-04	November 5, 1935	2nd term	
339	Edward W. Curley	D	NY-22	November 5, 1935	2nd term	
340	Gabriel H. Mahon Jr.	D	SC-04	November 3, 1936	2nd term	Left the House in 1939.
341	Arthur W. Aleshire	D	OH-07	January 3, 1937	1st term	Left the House in 1939.
342	A. Leonard Allen	D	LA-08	January 3, 1937	1st term	
343	Robert G. Allen	D	PA-28	January 3, 1937	1st term	
344	William F. Allen	D	DE	January 3, 1937	1st term	Left the House in 1939.
345	Charles Arthur Anderson	D	MO-12	January 3, 1937	1st term	
346	Laurence F. Arnold	D	IL-23	January 3, 1937	1st term	
347	Richard Merrill Atkinson	D	TN-05	January 3, 1937	1st term	Left the House in 1939.
348	George J. Bates	R	MA-06	January 3, 1937	1st term	
349	John Bernard	R	MN-08	January 3, 1937	1st term	Left the House in 1939.
350	Herbert S. Bigelow	D	OH-02	January 3, 1937	1st term	Left the House in 1939.
351	Lyle Boren	D	OK-04	January 3, 1937	1st term	
352	Lewis L. Boyer	D	IL-15	January 3, 1937	1st term	Left the House in 1939.
353	Michael J. Bradley	D	PA-03	January 3, 1937	1st term	
354	Overton Brooks	D	LA-04	January 3, 1937	1st term	
355	William T. Byrne	D	NY-28	January 3, 1937	1st term	
356	Francis Case	R	SD-02	January 3, 1937	1st term	
357	Edwin V. Champion	D	IL	January 3, 1937	1st term	Left the House in 1939.
358	Charles R. Clason	R	MA-02	January 3, 1937	1st term	
359	Harold K. Claypool	D	OH-11	January 3, 1937	1st term	
360	E. Harold Cluett	R	NY-29	January 3, 1937	1st term	
361	John M. Coffee	D	WA-06	January 3, 1937	1st term	
362	Ross A. Collins	D	MS-05	January 3, 1937; Previous service, 1921–1935.	8th term*	
363	Peter J. De Muth	D	PA-30	January 3, 1937	1st term	Left the House in 1939.
364	Joseph A. Dixon	D	OH-01	January 3, 1937	1st term	Left the House in 1939.
365	Fred J. Douglas	R	NY-33	January 3, 1937	1st term	
366	Cassius C. Dowell	R	IA-06	January 3, 1937; Previous service, 1915–1935.	11th term*	
367	Ira W. Drew	D	PA-07	January 3, 1937	1st term	Left the House in 1939.
368	Herman P. Eberharter	D	PA-32	January 3, 1937	1st term	
369	William J. Fitzgerald	D	CT-02	January 3, 1937	1st term	Left the House in 1939.
370	J. Harold Flannery	D	PA-12	January 3, 1937	1st term	
371	Anthony A. Fleger	D	OH-22	January 3, 1937	1st term	Left the House in 1939.
372	Aime Forand	D	RI-01	January 3, 1937	1st term	Left the House in 1939.
373	Frank W. Fries	D	IL-21	January 3, 1937	1st term	
374	Clyde L. Garrett	D	TX-17	January 3, 1937	1st term	
375	Noble Jones Gregory	D	KY-01	January 3, 1937	1st term	
376	John K. Griffith	D	LA-06	January 3, 1937	1st term	
377	Norman R. Hamilton	D	VA-02	January 3, 1937	1st term	Left the House in 1939.
378	Franck R. Havenner	D	CA-04	January 3, 1937	1st term	
379	Nan Wood Honeyman	D	OR-03	January 3, 1937	1st term	Left the House in 1939.
380	Edouard Izac	D	CA-20	January 3, 1937	1st term	
381	William S. Jacobsen	D	IA-02	January 3, 1937	1st term	
382	Pete Jarman	D	AL-06	January 3, 1937	1st term	
383	Benjamin Jarrett	R	PA-20	January 3, 1937	1st term	
384	Dewey Johnson	R	MN-05	January 3, 1937	1st term	Left the House in 1939.
385	Vincent F. Harrington	D	IA-09	January 3, 1937	1st term	
386	Joe Hendricks	D	FL-05	January 3, 1937	1st term	
387	Robert P. Hill	D	OK-05	January 3, 1937; Previous service, 1913–1915.	2nd term*	Died on October 29, 1937.
388	John F. Hunter	D	OH-09	January 3, 1937	1st term	
389	Arthur B. Jenks	R	NH-01	January 3, 1937	1st term	Resigned on June 9, 1938.
390	George Bradshaw Kelly	R	NY-38	January 3, 1937	1st term	Left the House in 1939.
391	Eugene James Keogh	D	NY-09	January 3, 1937	1st term	
392	Michael J. Kirwan	D	OH-19	January 3, 1937	1st term	
393	Wade H. Kitchens	D	AR-07	January 3, 1937	1st term	
394	James J. Lanzetta	D	NY-20	January 3, 1937; Previous service, 1933–1935.	2nd term*	Left the House in 1939.
395	Charles H. Leavy	D	WA-05	January 3, 1937	1st term	
396	Lewis M. Long	D	IL	January 3, 1937	1st term	Left the House in 1939.
397	Robert Luce	R	MA-09	January 3, 1937; Previous service, 1919–1935.	9th term*	
398	John F. Luecke	D	MI-11	January 3, 1937	1st term	Left the House in 1939.
399	Warren Magnuson	D	WA-01	January 3, 1937	1st term	
400	Noah M. Mason	R	IL-12	January 3, 1937	1st term	
401	James P. McGranery	D	PA-02	January 3, 1937	1st term	
402	John McSweeney	D	OH	January 3, 1937; Previous service, 1923–1929.	4th term*	Left the House in 1939.
403	Newt V. Mills	D	LA-05	January 3, 1937	1st term	
404	Harold G. Mosier	D	OH	January 3, 1937	1st term	Left the House in 1939.
405	Guy L. Moser	D	PA-14	January 3, 1937	1st term	
406	Robert L. Mouton	D	LA-03	January 3, 1937	1st term	
407	John R. Murdock	D	AZ	January 3, 1937	1st term	
408	Stephen Pace	D	GA-03	January 3, 1937	1st term	
409	Luther Patrick	D	AL-09	January 3, 1937	1st term	
410	Alfred N. Phillips	D	CT-04	January 3, 1937	1st term	Left the House in 1939.
411	James C. Oliver	R	ME-01	January 3, 1937	1st term	
412	George D. O'Brien	D	MI-13	January 3, 1937	1st term	Left the House in 1939.
413	Jerry J. O'Connell	D	MT-01	January 3, 1937	1st term	Left the House in 1939.
414	James F. O'Connor	D	MT-02	January 3, 1937	1st term	
415	Edward L. O'Neill	D	NJ-11	January 3, 1937	1st term	Left the House in 1939.
416	Donald Lawrence O'Toole	D	NY-08	January 3, 1937	1st term	
417	William R. Poage	D	TX-11	January 3, 1937	1st term	
418	Edward Herbert Rees	R	KS-04	January 3, 1937	1st term	
419	Hugh M. Rigney	D	IL-19	January 3, 1937	1st term	Left the House in 1939.
420	Albert G. Rutherford	R	PA-15	January 3, 1937	1st term	
421	Leon Sacks	D	PA-01	January 3, 1937	1st term	
422	Paul W. Shafer	R	MI-03	January 3, 1937	1st term	
423	Harry R. Sheppard	D	CA-19	January 3, 1937	1st term	
424	Clyde H. Smith	R	ME-02	January 3, 1937	1st term	
425	John Sparkman	D	AL-08	January 3, 1937	1st term	
426	Guy J. Swope	D	PA-19	January 3, 1937	1st term	Left the House in 1939.
427	Henry Teigan	R	MN-03	January 3, 1937	1st term	Left the House in 1939.
428	Albert Thomas	D	TX-08	January 3, 1937	1st term	
429	J. Parnell Thomas	R	NJ-07	January 3, 1937	1st term	
430	Frank William Towey Jr.	D	NJ-12	January 3, 1937	1st term	Left the House in 1939.
431	Andrew J. Transue	D	MI-06	January 3, 1937	1st term	Left the House in 1939.
432	Elmer H. Wene	D	NJ-02	January 3, 1937	1st term	Left the House in 1939.
433	Dudley A. White	R	OH-13	January 3, 1937	1st term	
434	Jerry Voorhis	D	CA-12	January 3, 1937	1st term	
	Beverly M. Vincent	D	KY-02	March 2, 1937	1st term	
	Lyndon B. Johnson	D	TX-10	April 10, 1937	1st term	
	Alfred J. Elliott	D	CA-10	May 4, 1937	1st term	
	Richard M. Simpson	R	PA-18	May 11, 1937	1st term	
	Lawrence J. Connery	D	MA-07	September 28, 1937	1st term	
	Bruce Fairchild Barton	R	NY-17	November 2, 1937	1st term	
	Ralph A. Gamble	R	NY-25	November 2, 1937	1st term	
	Lewis K. Rockefeller	R	NY-27	November 2, 1937	1st term	
	Dave E. Satterfield Jr.	D	VA-03	November 2, 1937	1st term	
	Gomer Griffith Smith	D	OK-05	December 10, 1937	1st term	Left the House in 1939.
	Thomas A. Flaherty	D	MA-11	December 14, 1937	1st term	
	Joe B. Bates	D	KY-08	June 4, 1938	1st term	
	Alphonse Roy	D	NH-01	June 9, 1938	1st term	Left the House in 1939.
	George M. Grant	D	AL-02	June 14, 1938	1st term	
	Elizabeth Hawley Gasque	D	SC-06	September 13, 1938	1st term	Left the House in 1939.
	Walter H. Albaugh	R	OH-04	November 8, 1938	1st term	Left the House in 1939.

== Delegates ==
Rank	Delegate	Party	District	Seniority date (previous service, if any)	No. of term(s)	Notes
1	Anthony Dimond	D	AK	March 4, 1933	3rd term	
2	Santiago Iglesias	Coalitionist	PR	March 4, 1933	3rd term	
3	Samuel Wilder King	R	HI	January 3, 1935	2nd term	
4	Quintin Paredes	Nac	PHL	February 14, 1936	2nd term	
5	Joaquin Miguel Elizalde	Nac	PHL	September 29, 1938	1st term	

== See also ==
- 75th United States Congress
- List of United States congressional districts
- List of United States senators in the 75th Congress
