= 1950 United States Senate election in Illinois =

- November 7, 1950
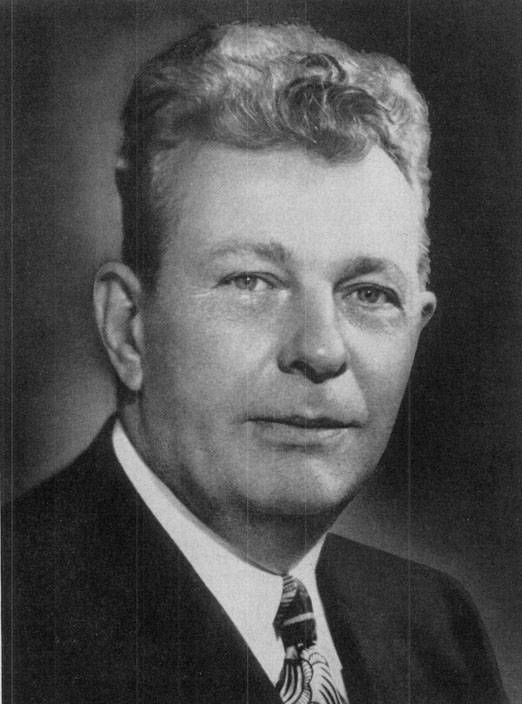

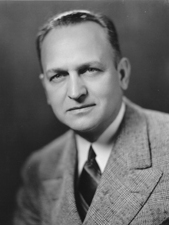
Nominee	Everett M. Dirksen	Scott W. Lucas
Party	Republican	Democratic
Popular vote	1,951,984	1,657,630
Percentage	53.88%	45.76%
- County results Dirksen: 40–50% 50–60% 60–70% 70–80% Lucas: 40–50% 50–60% 60–70%
Senator before election
Scott W. Lucas
Democratic
Elected Senator
Everett M. Dirksen
Republican

The 1950 United States Senate election in Illinois was held on Tuesday, November 7. Democratic incumbent Scott W. Lucas, who was also Senate majority leader, ran for a third term in office but was defeated by Republican U.S. representative Everett Dirksen.

Primary elections were held on April 11. Lucas was unopposed for the Democratic Party nomination, having secured the unanimous support of his party, while Dirksen defeated William J. Baker and perennial gadfly Lar Daly.

The general election campaign was among the most closely watched in the 1950 United States elections, with major national issues including the Korean War, socialized medicine, communism and McCarthyism, and the Marshall Plan. National figures in both parties, including President Harry S. Truman and Wisconsin senator Joseph McCarthy, personally campaigned for their parties' respective candidates. Ultimately, Dirksen was carried over the top by a wave of Republican support throughout the country, as well as local opposition to organized crime and the Cook County Democratic Organization in the wake of the Kefauver committee hearings in Chicago. On Election Day, Dirksen carried a majority of the vote, including in the state's most populous county, Cook County, which cast a majority of the statewide vote and where he narrowly defeated Lucas.

Lucas was the second party leader to ever lose re-election to the Senate, and only one to do so while his party retained the majority. Dirksen himself later became the Republican leader in the Senate in 1959, making this the only race between two party leaders until the 2004 United States Senate election in South Dakota. The result had long-term effects on the trajectory of both the Democratic and Republican parties, particularly within the Senate, and the presidential prospects of Lucas, Estes Kefauver, and Adlai Stevenson II during the 1950s.

== Background ==
Scott W. Lucas of Mason County was first elected to the United States Senate in 1938 and easily re-elected in 1944. Rising within his party to become Senate majority leader, Lucas was considered a prime contender for the office of vice president or even president of the United States.

Everett Dirksen had represented his hometown of Pekin and the neighboring city of Peoria in the U.S. House of Representatives from 1933 and 1949, retiring due to a serious vision problem from which he had fully recovered by 1950. Dirksen decided to challenge Lucas in early 1949, shortly after he left office. He hired a campaign manager, Harold Rainville, who had also managed Richard Lyons's unsuccessful campaign against Lucas in 1938 and Dwight Green's successful gubernatorial campaign in 1940.

== Democratic primary ==
=== Candidates ===
- Scott W. Lucas, incumbent U.S. senator since 1939 and Senate majority leader

=== Campaign ===
In addition to popular support, Lucas enjoyed the support of the entire Democratic establishment, including Harry S. Truman, Paul Douglas, Adlai Stevenson II, and the Cook County political machine. He did not face a serious challenge for the Democratic nomination. He announced his re-election bid on December 27, 1949 in his hometown of Havana, with Stevenson and Paul Powell in attendance. He was supported by a campaign dramatization of his life entitled "The Times and the Man," which aired on radio stations throughout the state.

=== Results ===
1950 Democratic U.S. Senate primary
Party	Candidate	Votes	%
Democratic	Scott W. Lucas (incumbent)	768,801	100.00%
Write-in		7	0.00%
Total votes		768,808	100.00%

== Republican primary ==
=== Candidates ===
- William J. Baker
- Lawrence Joseph Sarsfield Daly, perennial candidate
- Everett Dirksen, U.S. representative from Pekin

=== Campaign ===
Dirksen began to actively seek support for the nomination in September 1949, when he met with Chicago Tribune publisher Robert R. McCormick. According to Dirksen's wife, Louella, McCormick attempted to extract political promises from Dirksen in exchange for the Tribune's support, and Dirksen declined. However, during the general election campaign, the St. Louis Post-Dispatch claimed that Dirksen had compromised his position on the Marshall Plan and American intervention in foreign policy to gain McCormick's support.

Dirksen declared his campaign publicly on September 18.

=== Results ===
1950 Republican U.S. Senate primary
Party	Candidate	Votes	%
Republican	Everett Dirksen	545,028	73.46%
Republican	William J. Baker	149,286	20.12%
Republican	Lar Daly	47,668	6.43%
Write-in		2	0.00%
Total votes		741,984	100.00%

== General election ==
=== Candidates ===
- Everett Dirksen, U.S. representative from Pekin (Republican)
- Enoch A. Holtwick, Greenville College history professor, temperance activist, and perennial candidate (Prohibition)
- Scott W. Lucas, incumbent U.S. senator since 1939 and Senate majority leader (Democratic)

=== Campaign ===
Facing a weak primary challenge from Baker, Dirksen began to focus his campaign on Lucas and the incumbent president before the April primary. The two candidates differed greatly in personal style; Lucas was a polished national statesman and campaigned in expensive suits, while Dirksen had a rumpled, folksy style. Generally speaking, Lucas had support from organized labor and was opposed by dairy farmers and the American Medical Association, which alleged that he supported socialized medicine. The Dirksen campaign sought to reverse some of the losses which Republicans had suffered in the African American vote in Chicago during the New Deal era. Dirksen wrote to Republican National Committee chair Guy Gabrielson in June of "our program for recovering the colored vote in Chicago," and Rainville claimed, "[We] have one thousand young negros (sic) organizing a strong campaign." The Dirksen campaign also organized "German-American clubs" and "a strong college and young married group of workers," preferring to campaign directly among voters rather than through the traditional party organization.

During the final weeks of the race, Lucas's ability to campaign was limited by a viral infection that made it difficult to speak.

==== Korean War and anticommunism ====
Lucas defended his record and that of the Truman administration, including the Marshall Plan, which he claimed had returned millions of dollars to Illinois businesses. Privately, he appealed to his party for support, claiming that "isolationists and reactionaries" sought to unseat him to undermine Truman. Although Dirksen had voted for the Marshall Plan, he now criticized it as wasteful spending. The Lucas campaign therefore sought to portray Dirksen as a flip-flopper, publishing a 400-page work on Dirksen's record entitled The Diary of a Chameleon, charging that Dirksen had "literally stood for nothing" during his time in the House. Lucas's claims were echoed in the Chicago Sun-Times. Dirksen countered that he had often changed his position when presented with "changing conditions," including his support for American efforts regarding the war in Europe in September 1941, after previously opposing such efforts.

National debates over civil liberties and communism eventually came to dominate the campaign. In May, Lucas campaigned with Truman in Chicago, and Joseph McCarthy of Wisconsin delivered several anti-Lucas speeches in the Chicago area, having targeted the senator for defeat after he had opposed McCarthy's anticommunist crusade. McCarthy called a vote for Dirksen "a prayer for America" and a vote against the "commicrat party," which would "kick the perfumed pinks and punks out of our State Department." The Dirksen campaign privately recorded that anticommunism was a major issue in the campaign, as well as the Lavender Scare, which had revealed "that there are ninety-two perverts (sic) in Washington in the State Department alone." The Korean War, which began in June, also played a role in the campaign. Dirksen evocatively claimed that, "All the piety of the administration will not put any life into the bodies of the young men coming back in wooden boxes." At his party's state convention, he said that Lucas's "endless declamation of what he has done for peace ... are now lost in the noise of gunfire from Korea."

==== Adlai Stevenson ====
Governor Adlai Stevenson II, who would go on to win his party's nomination for president in 1952, played a limited role in the campaign. At the Illinois State Fair in mid-August, he criticized McCarthy and Dirksen for framing opposition to communism as a partisan issue, claiming that it should be treated as "a battle for survival, not a witch hunt." In mid-October, Paul Douglas, who campaigned vigorously on Lucas's behalf, urged Stevenson to campaign more actively, but he declined. Douglas speechwriter Frank Kelly later claimed that Stevenson "took a kind of haughty attitude toward Lucas," whom he deemed "a standard politician type." Stevenson did return to the campaign trail in its final week, delivering a number of speeches for Lucas, though he privately recorded his distaste for campaigning on behalf of "the ticket" and for "the politicians" who pressured him to "do [his] bit."

==== Kefauver committee hearings ====
Local organized crime was a major issue in the late campaign, after the Kefauver committee held hearings in Chicago in early October. The hearings, led by ambitious Democratic senator and future presidential candidate Estes Kefauver of Tennessee, drew attention to the continuing presence of organized crime in the city and its association with the Cook County Democratic Organization led by Jacob Arvey. In particular, the Democratic nomination of Daniel Gilbert for sheriff, which both Lucas and Douglas had opposed, was a major albatross for the Democratic ticket. During the hearings and the campaign, Gilbert was identified as "the world's richest cop" for his personal wealth of over $300,000 (approximately $3 million in 2025), which was partly amassed through gambling interests, despite a relatively low county salary.

According to Lucas's autobiography, he attempted in early August to persuade Kefauver to investigate a Republican political machine in another state such as Pennsylvania (where majority whip Francis J. Myers faced a tough race of his own) California, or New York instead, given his committee had just investigated Democratic machines in Kansas City and Miami. He cited both party interests and the principle of senatorial courtesy, which implied that senators should consult with their colleagues before involving themselves in the affairs of another state. According to Lucas's own account, Kefauver increased his resolve to investigate Chicago after this meeting. Kefauver did close the hearings to the public and press and paused them entirely in late October, prior to Election Day.

On November 2, the Chicago Sun-Times published a leaked transcript of Gilbert's own testimony to the committee, in which he admitted on the record to illegal gambling. The Gilbert testimony and focus on connections between Chicago organized crime and the Democratic Party put the already-limited Lucas on the defensive for the final stretch of campaigning.

=== Debates ===
Lucas declined to debate Dirksen directly, but Dirksen did debate junior senator Paul Douglas on the topic of foreign policy.

=== Results ===
Dirksen won 82 of 102 counties, including a narrow majority in Cook County, a resounding victory over Lucas and one of many Republican victories in the 1950 elections, although the Democratic Party retained its majority in both the national Senate and House.

1950 U.S. Senate election in Illinois
Party	Candidate	Votes	%	±%
Republican	Everett McKinley Dirksen	1,951,984	53.88%	▲6.82
Democratic	Scott W. Lucas (incumbent)	1,657,630	45.76%	▼6.85
Prohibition	Enoch A. Holtwick	13,050	0.36%	▲0.21
Write-in		9	0.00%	Steady
Total votes		3,622,673	100	

== Aftermath and analysis ==
Lucas's defeat was considered the since most important result of the 1950 elections, dramatically increasing the prestige of both Dirksen and Joseph McCarthy among Republicans. The result also lowered the prestige of Estes Kefauver within the Democratic Party; many party leaders blamed him for Lucas's loss, hampering his campaigns for the presidency in 1952 and 1956, which he lost to Adlai Stevenson II.

Lucas attempted to run for the seat again in 1956, but he was opposed by Chicago mayor Richard J. Daley, and the party nominated state representative Richard Stengel instead.

According to political scientist David Truman, writing in 1959, the 1950 defeats of both Lucas and Myers, as well as the 1952 defeat of Lucas's successor as majority leader, Ernest McFarland, made formidable senators without secure seats (such as J. Lister Hill of Alabama) less likely to accept party leadership roles.

== See also ==
- 1950 United States Senate elections
