= List of United States senators in the 75th Congress =

This is a complete list of United States senators during the 75th United States Congress listed by seniority from January 3, 1937, to January 3, 1939.

Order of service is based on the commencement of the senator's first term. Behind this is former service as a senator (only giving the senator seniority within their new incoming class), service as vice president, a House member, a cabinet secretary, or a governor of a state. The final factor is the population of the senator's state.

Senators who were sworn in during the middle of the Congress (up until the last senator who was not sworn in early after winning the November 1938 election) are listed at the end of the list with no number.

In this Congress, the most senior junior senator was Gerald Nye. The most junior senior senator was Charles Andrews until January 17, 1938, after which it was William Smathers.

== Terms of service ==
Class	Terms of service of senators that expired in years
Class 3	Terms of service of senators that expired in 1939 (AL, AR, AZ, CA, CO, CT, FL, GA, ID, IL, IN, IA, KS, KY, LA, MD, MO, NC, ND, NH, NV, NY, OH, OK, OR, PA, SC, SD, UT, VT, WA, and WI.)
Class 1	Terms of service of senators that expired in 1941 (AZ, CA, CT, DE, FL, IN, MA, MD, ME, MI, MN, MO, MS, MT, ND, NE, NJ, NM, NV, NY, OH, PA, RI, TN, TX, UT, VA, VT, WA, WI, WV, and WY.)
Class 2	Terms of service of senators that expired in 1943 (AL, AR, CO, DE, GA, IA, ID, IL, KS, KY, LA, MA, ME, MI, MN, MS, MT, NC, NE, NH, NJ, NM, OK, OR, RI, SC, SD, TN, TX, VA, WV, and WY.)

== U.S. Senate seniority list ==
U.S. Senate seniority
Rank	Senator (party-state)	Seniority date	Other factors
1	William Borah (R-ID)	March 4, 1907	
2	Ellison D. Smith (D-SC)	March 4, 1909	
3	Henry F. Ashurst (D-AZ)	April 2, 1912	
4	Key Pittman (D-NV)	January 29, 1913	
5	Morris Sheppard (D-TX)	February 3, 1913	
6	Joseph Robinson (D-AR)	March 4, 1913	Former representative (10 years), former governor
7	George W. Norris (I-NE)	March 4, 1913	Former representative (10 years)
8	Kenneth McKellar (D-TN)	March 4, 1917	Former representative (6 years)
9	William H. King (D-UT)	March 4, 1917	Former representative (3 years)
10	Frederick Hale (R-ME)	March 4, 1917	
11	Hiram Johnson (R-CA)	March 16, 1917	
12	Charles L. McNary (R-OR)	December 18, 1918	
13	Arthur Capper (R-KS)	March 4, 1919	
13	Pat Harrison (D-MS)	March 5, 1919	
15	Carter Glass (D-VA)	February 2, 1920	
16	Walter F. George (D-GA)	November 22, 1922	
17	Lynn Frazier (R-ND)	March 4, 1923	Former governor
18	Royal S. Copeland (D-NY)	March 4, 1923	New York 1st in population (1920)
19	Henrik Shipstead (FL-MN)	March 4, 1923	Minnesota 17th in population (1920)
20	Burton K. Wheeler (D-MT)	March 4, 1923	Montana 39th in population (1920)
21	Robert M. La Follette Jr. (WP-WI)	September 30, 1925	
22	Gerald Nye (R-ND)	November 14, 1925	
23	David I. Walsh (D-MA)	December 6, 1926	
24	Carl Hayden (D-AZ)	March 4, 1927	Former representative (15 years)
25	Alben W. Barkley (D-KY)	March 4, 1927	Former representative (14 years)
26	Elmer Thomas (D-OK)	March 4, 1927	Former representative (4 years), Oklahoma 21st in population (1920)
27	Millard Tydings (D-MD)	March 4, 1927	Former representative (4 years), Maryland 28th in population (1920)
28	Robert F. Wagner (D-NY)	March 4, 1927	New York 1st in population (1920)
29	Hugo Black (D-AL)	March 4, 1927	Alabama 18th in population (1920)
30	Frederick Steiwer (R-OR)	March 4, 1927	Oregon 34th in population (1920)
31	Arthur H. Vandenberg (R-MI)	March 31, 1928	
32	Tom Connally (D-TX)	March 4, 1929	Former representative
33	John G. Townsend Jr. (R-DE)	March 4, 1929	
34	Robert J. Bulkley (D-OH)	December 1, 1930	Former representative
35	George McGill (D-KS)	December 1, 1930	
36	James J. Davis (R-PA)	December 2, 1930	
37	Matthew M. Neely (D-WV)	March 4, 1931	Previously a senator (6 years), former representative (8 years)
38	J. Hamilton Lewis (D-IL)	March 4, 1931	Previously a senator (6 years), former representative (2 years)
39	James F. Byrnes (D-SC)	March 4, 1931	Former representative (14 years), South Carolina 26th in population (1930)
40	Wallace H. White Jr. (R-ME)	March 4, 1931	Former representative (14 years), Maine 35th in population (1930)
41	William J. Bulow (D-SD)	March 4, 1931	Former governor
42	Josiah W. Bailey (D-NC)	March 4, 1931	North Carolina 12th in population (1930)
43	John H. Bankhead II (D-AL)	March 4, 1931	Alabama 15th in population (1930)
44	Marvel M. Logan (D-KY)	March 4, 1931	Kentucky 17th in population (1930)
45	Warren Austin (R-VT)	April 1, 1931	
46	Hattie Caraway (D-AR)	November 13, 1931	
47	Robert R. Reynolds (D-NC)	December 5, 1932	
48	Richard Russell Jr. (D-GA)	January 12, 1933	
49	Bennett Champ Clark (D-MO)	February 4, 1933	
50	Alva B. Adams (D-CO)	March 4, 1933	Previously a senator
51	Augustine Lonergan (D-CT)	March 4, 1933	Former representative (8 years)
52	William H. Dieterich (D-IL)	March 4, 1933	Former representative (2 years), Illinois 3rd in population (1930)
53	John H. Overton (D-LA)	March 4, 1933	Former representative (2 years), Louisiana 22nd in population (1930)
54	Harry F. Byrd Sr. (D-VA)	March 4, 1933	Former governor (4 years)
55	Fred H. Brown (D-NH)	March 4, 1933	Former governor (2 years)
56	William Gibbs McAdoo (D-CA)	March 4, 1933	California 6th in population (1930)
57	Frederick Van Nuys (D-IN)	March 4, 1933	Indiana 11th in population (1930)
58	F. Ryan Duffy (D-WI)	March 4, 1933	Wisconsin 13th in population (1930)
59	Nathan L. Bachman (D-TN)	March 4, 1933	Tennessee 16th in population (1930)
60	Homer T. Bone (D-WA)	March 4, 1933	Washington 30th in population (1930)
61	Elbert D. Thomas (D-UT)	March 4, 1933	Utah 40th in population (1930)
62	James Pope (D-ID)	March 4, 1933	Idaho 42nd in population (1930)
63	Pat McCarran (D-NV)	March 4, 1933	Nevada 48th in population (1930)
64	Carl Hatch (D-NM)	October 10, 1933	
65	Ernest W. Gibson (R-VT)	November 21, 1933	
66	Joseph C. O'Mahoney (D-WY)	January 1, 1934	
67	James Murray (D-MT)	November 7, 1934	
68	Peter G. Gerry (D-RI)	January 3, 1935	Previously a senator
69	Francis T. Maloney (D-CT)	January 3, 1935	Former representative, Connecticut 29th in population (1930)
70	Edward R. Burke (D-NE)	January 3, 1935	Former representative, Nebraska 32nd in population (1930)
71	Theodore G. Bilbo (D-MS)	January 3, 1935	Former governor (8 years)
72	Vic Donahey (D-OH)	January 3, 1935	Former governor (6 years), Ohio 4th in population (1930)
73	A. Harry Moore (D-NJ)	January 3, 1935	Former governor (6 years), New Jersey 9th in population (1930)
74	Joseph F. Guffey (D-PA)	January 3, 1935	Pennsylvania 2nd in population (1930)
75	Harry S. Truman (D-MO)	January 3, 1935	Missouri 10th in population (1930)
76	Sherman Minton (D-IN)	January 3, 1935	Indiana 11th in population (1930)
77	George L. P. Radcliffe (D-MD)	January 3, 1935	Maryland 28th in population (1930)
78	Lewis B. Schwellenbach (D-WA)	January 3, 1935	Washington 30th in population (1930)
79	Dennis Chavez (D-NM)	May 11, 1935	
80	Rush D. Holt (D-WV)	June 21, 1935	
81	Guy Mark Gillette (D-IA)	November 4, 1936	Former representative
82	Charles O. Andrews (D-FL)	November 4, 1936	"A" 1st in alphabet
83	Claude Pepper (D-FL)	November 4, 1936	"P" 16th in alphabet
84	Prentiss M. Brown (D-MI)	November 19, 1936	
85	Herbert E. Hitchcock (D-SD)	December 29, 1936	
86	Ernest Lundeen (FL-MN)	January 3, 1937	Former representative (6 years)
87	Joshua B. Lee (D-OK)	January 3, 1937	Former representative (2 years)
88	Clyde L. Herring (D-IA)	January 3, 1937	Former governor (4 years), Iowa 19th in population (1930)
89	Edwin C. Johnson (D-CO)	January 3, 1937	Former governor (4 years), Colorado 33rd in population (1930)
90	Theodore F. Green (D-RI)	January 3, 1937	Former governor (4 years), Rhode Island 37th in population (1930)
91	Styles Bridges (R-NH)	January 3, 1937	Former governor (2 years)
92	Henry Cabot Lodge Jr. (R-MA)	January 3, 1937	Massachusetts 8th in population (1930)
93	Allen J. Ellender (D-LA)	January 3, 1937	Louisiana 22nd in population (1930)
94	James H. Hughes (D-DE)	January 3, 1937	Delaware 46th in population (1930)
95	Henry H. Schwartz (D-WY)	January 3, 1937	Wyoming 47th in population (1930)
96	William H. Smathers (D-NJ)	April 15, 1937	
	George L. Berry (D-TN)	May 6, 1937	
	Dixie Bibb Graves (D-AL)	August 20, 1937	
	John E. Miller (D-AR)	November 15, 1937	
	Joseph L. Hill (D-AL)	January 11, 1938	
	John Milton (D-NJ)	January 18, 1938	
	Alfred E. Reames (D-OR)	February 1, 1938	
	William Warren Barbour (R-NJ)	November 9, 1938	Previously a senator
	Thomas M. Storke (D-CA)	November 9, 1938	California 6th in population (1930)
	Tom Stewart (D-TN)	November 9, 1938	Tennessee 16th in population (1930)
	Alexander G. Barry (R-OR)	November 9, 1938	Oregon 34th in population (1930)
	Gladys Pyle (R-SD)	November 9, 1938	South Dakota 36th in population (1930)
	James M. Mead (D-NY)	December 3, 1938	

The most senior senators by class were Henry F. Ashurst (R-Arizona) from Class 1, William Borah (R-Idaho) from Class 2, and Ellison D. Smith (D-South Carolina) from Class 3.

== See also ==
- 75th United States Congress
- List of United States representatives in the 75th Congress
