= Richard Yates (politician) =

Richard Yates most commonly refers to:

- Richard Yates Sr. (1815–1873), 13th governor of Illinois (1861–1865), U.S. Senator from Illinois (1865–1871), U.S. Congressman from Illinois (1851–1855), member of Illinois House of Representatives (1842–1845, 1848–1849)
- Richard Yates Jr. (1860–1936), son of above, 22nd governor of Illinois (1901–1905), U.S. Congressman from Illinois (1919–1933)
