= Michael L. Igoe =

American judge and politician (1885-1967)

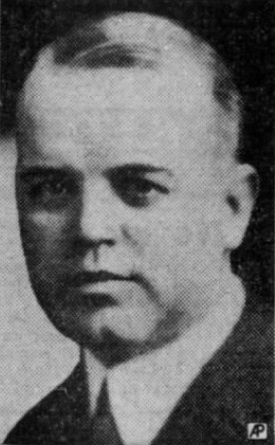
- Portrait of Igoe, circa 1936

Senior Judge of the United States District Court for the Northern District of Illinois
- In office August 31, 1965 – August 21, 1967

Judge of the United States District Court for the Northern District of Illinois
- In office November 21, 1938 – August 31, 1965
- Appointed by: Franklin D. Roosevelt
- Preceded by: Seat established by 52 Stat. 584
- Succeeded by: William Joseph Lynch

United States Attorney for the Northern District of Illinois
- In office 1935–1938
- Appointed by: Franklin D. Roosevelt

Member of the U.S. House of Representatives from Illinois's at-large district
- In office January 3, 1935 – June 2, 1935
- Preceded by: Walter Nesbit
- Succeeded by: Lewis M. Long

Member of the Illinois House of Representatives
- In office 1913–1930

Personal details
- Born: Michael Lambert Igoe; April 16, 1885 Saint Paul, Minnesota, US
- Died: August 21, 1967 (aged 82) Chicago, Illinois, US
- Resting place: All Saints Cemetery; Des Plaines, Illinois
- Party: Democratic
- Education: Georgetown Law (LL.B.)

Michael Lambert Igoe (April 16, 1885 – August 21, 1967) was a 20th-century American politician who served as a United States representative from Illinois, an Illinois state representative, a United States attorney for the Northern District of Illinois, and a United States district judge of the Northern District of Illinois.

== Education and career ==
Born in Saint Paul, Minnesota, Igoe was educated in the parochial schools and De La Salle Institute in Chicago, Illinois. He received a Bachelor of Laws from Georgetown Law in Washington, D.C., in 1908.

=== Legal career ===
He was admitted to the bar the same year and commenced practice in Chicago from 1908 to 1939. He was Chief Assistant United States Attorney of the Northern District of Illinois from 1915 to 1917. He was a member of the board of South Park Commissioners from 1924 to 1932.

== Political career ==
Igoe was a member of the Illinois House of Representatives from 1913 to 1930. He was a delegate to the Democratic National Convention in 1928 and a member of the Democratic National Committee from 1930 to 1932.

Igoe sought the Democratic nomination for Governor of Illinois in 1932, but was defeated by Henry Horner.

In 1920 he ran for Cook County state's attorney, winning the Democratic primary against incumbent Maclay Hoyne, but losing the general election to Republican nominee Robert E. Crowe.

=== Political rivalry with Anton Cermak ===
Following George E. Brennan's death in 1928, Democrats started to fight for party leadership. Members of the Democratic Party found four factions of power from Brennan's leadership. Igoe joined forces with Edward J. Kelly, to lead the South Park Board faction. However, once Anton Cermak's influence and power over the Democratic Party was clear, the South Park Board teamed up with the board of the Cook County's Sanitary District.

Cermak tried to appease Igoe once he consolidated power and had Igoe re-elected to the South Park Board in 1929.

The State attorney launched an investigation into the sanitary district and found that the board participated in mismanagement, payroll padding, illegal favors, and nepotism. The investigation lead to a grand jury indicting T.J. Crowe, James Whalen, and John J. Touhy, and Edward J. Kelly in 1930.

Cermak attempted to pacify Igoe following the sanitary district scandal by having him elected as national committeeman for the Democratic Party in 1930.

Igoe tried to win back control of the sanitary district in early December 1930 with the help of Whalen and Touhy but failed. It was well known within the Democratic Party that Cermak and Igoe have strained relations by then. On Christmas Eve, Igoe spoke highly of Cermak at a Democratic Party meeting. Two days later, Cermak endorsed Igoe to be the floor leader of the state house.

Igoe continued to support and defend Cermak's mayoral run in his district the following year. However, Cermak only won a total of 187 votes from Igoe's district, when the previous Democratic candidate won 3,000 votes in what was considered a disastrous campaign.

In 1931, Igoe decided to run for governor. Fearing Igoe would amass too much power and politically weaken Cermak, the refused to endorse him. Cermak feared Igoe would amass too much power.

=== Congress ===
Portrait of Igoe, circa 1938

In 1934, Igoe was elected as a Democrat to the United States House of Representatives of the 74th United States Congress, serving from January 3, 1935, until his resignation effective June 2, 1935, to take the post of United States Attorney for the Northern District of Illinois, serving from 1935 to 1939.

He ran unsuccessfully in the Democratic primary of the 1938 United States Senate election in Illinois.

== Federal judicial service ==
Igoe received a recess appointment from President Franklin D. Roosevelt on November 21, 1938, to the United States District Court for the Northern District of Illinois, to a new seat authorized by 52 Stat. 584. He was nominated to the same position by President Roosevelt on January 5, 1939. He was confirmed by the United States Senate on February 9, 1939, and received his commission on March 4, 1939. He assumed senior status on August 31, 1965.

== Death ==
His service terminated on August 21, 1967, due to his death in Chicago. He was interred in All Saints Cemetery in Des Plaines, Illinois.

== Electoral history ==
1920 Cook County State's Attorney election
Party	Candidate	Votes	%
Republican	Robert E. Crowe	525,115	58.44
Democratic	Michael L. Igoe	319,236	35.53
Socialist	William A. Cunnea	50,766	5.65
Farmer–Labor	John C. Teevan	3,463	0.39
Total votes		898,580	100

1932 Illinois at-large congressional district election
Party	Candidate	Votes	%
Democratic	Michael L. Igoe		28.2
Democratic	Martin A. Brennan		27.3
Republican	C. Wayland Brooks		28.2
Republican	Milton E. Jones		20.8
Progressive	Walter Nesbit		0.4
Socialist	Harold O. Hatcher		0.3
Socialist	Arthur McDowell		0.3
Prohibition	Martin Powroznik		0.9
Prohibition	Clay F. Gaumer		0.9
Socialist Labor	John L. Lindsey		0.06
Socialist Labor	Frank Schnur		0.06
Independent	Karl Lockner		0.00
Independent	Laverne Pruett		0.00
Total votes			100

== See also ==
- List of federal judges appointed by Franklin D. Roosevelt

== Sources ==
- United States Congress. "Michael Lambert Igoe (id: I000004)". Biographical Directory of the United States Congress.

U.S. House of Representatives
Preceded by Walter Nesbit	Member of the U.S. House of Representatives from Illinois's at-large congressional district 1935	Succeeded by Lewis M. Long
Legal offices
Preceded by Seat established by 52 Stat. 584	Judge of the United States District Court for the Northern District of Illinois; 1938–1965	Succeeded by William Joseph Lynch
