= 2004 United States Senate election in South Dakota =

- November 2, 2004
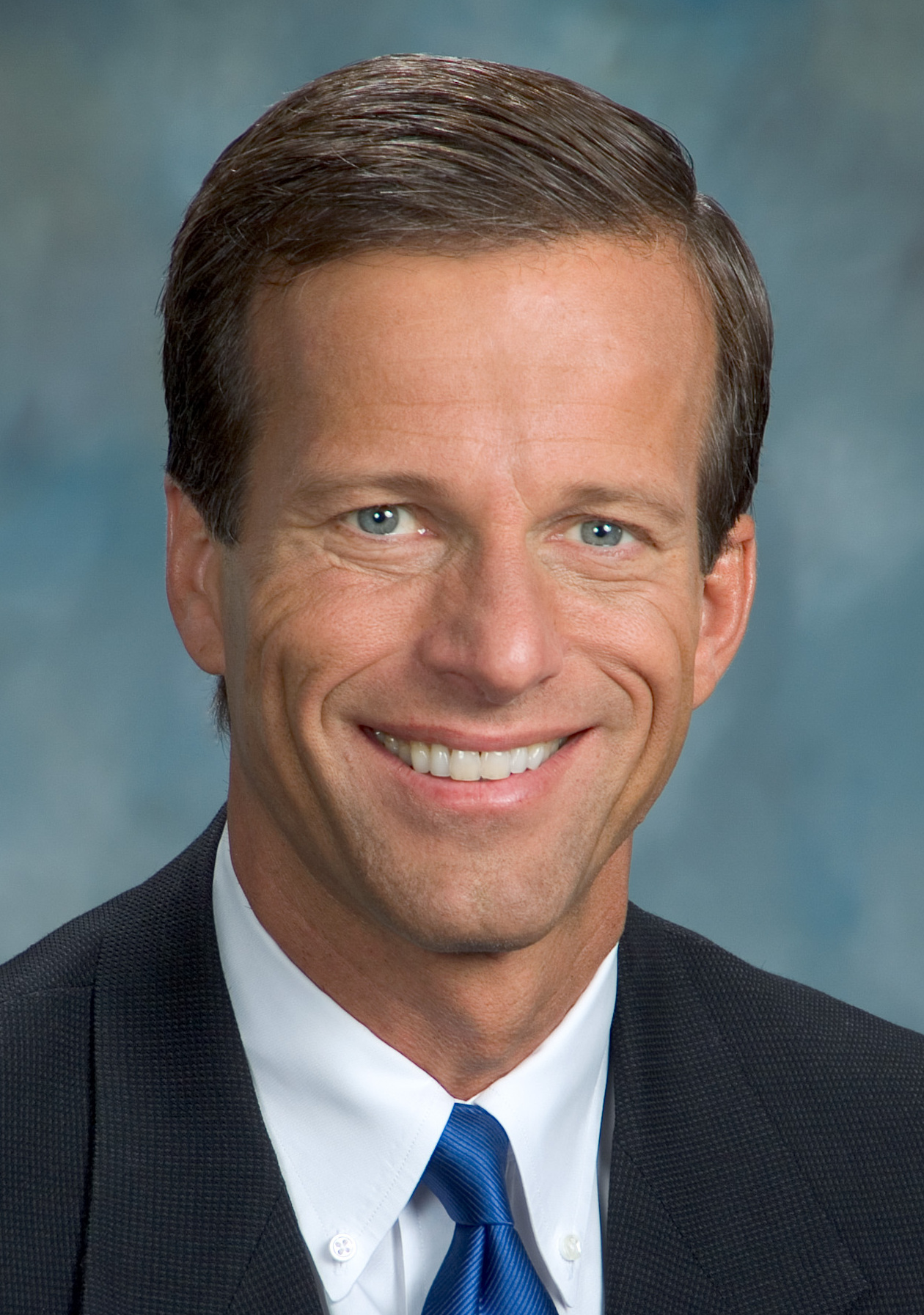

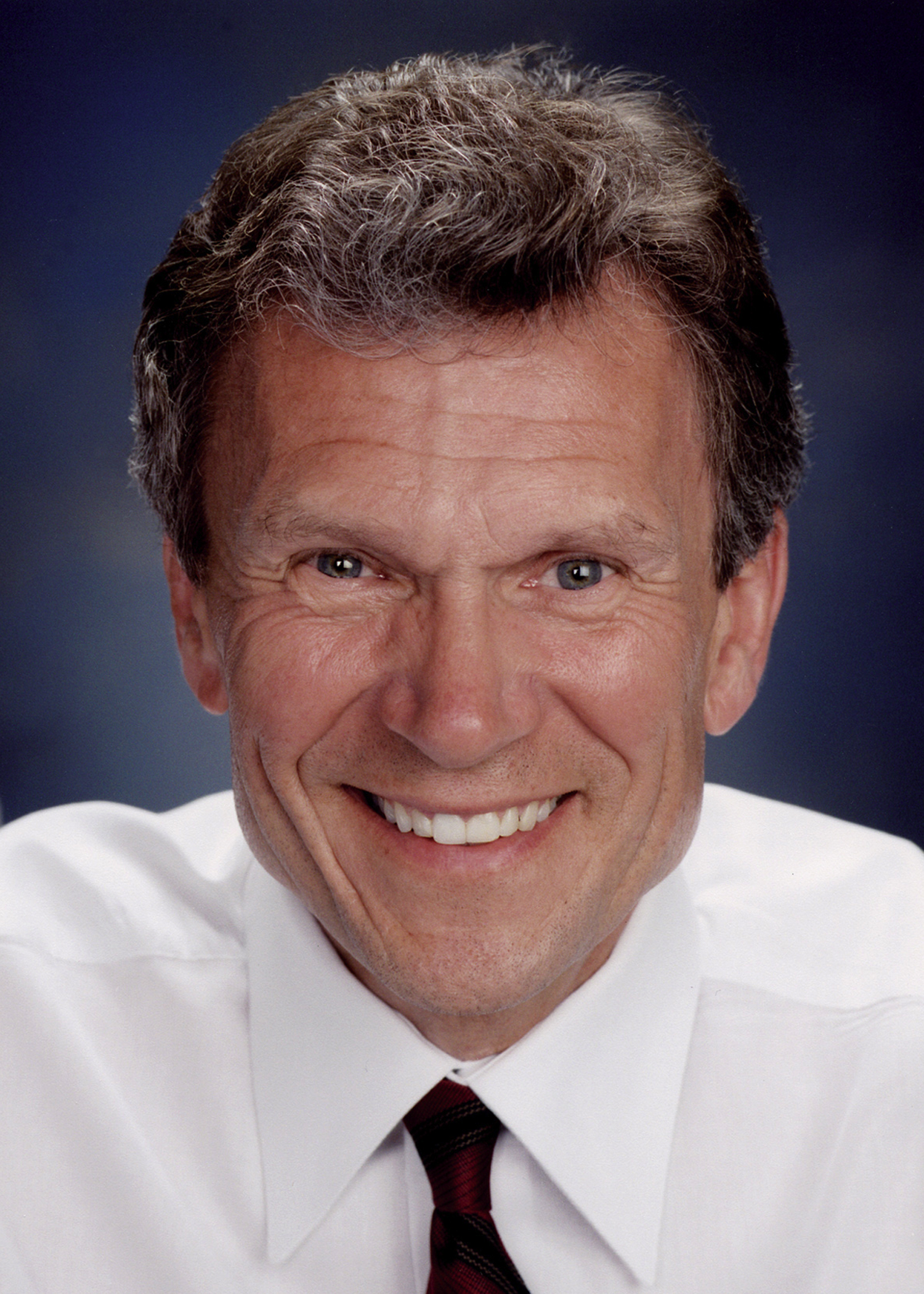
Nominee	John Thune	Tom Daschle
Party	Republican	Democratic
Popular vote	197,848	193,340
Percentage	50.58%	49.42%
- County results Thune: 50–60% 60–70% 70–80% Daschle: 50–60% 60–70% 70–80% 80–90%
U.S. senator before election
Tom Daschle
Democratic
Elected U.S. Senator
John Thune
Republican

The 2004 United States Senate election in South Dakota was held on November 2, 2004. Incumbent Democratic U.S. senator and Senate Minority Leader Tom Daschle ran for re-election to a fourth term, but was defeated by Republican John Thune.

Daschle was the only incumbent U.S. senator to lose re-election in the 2004 election cycle. His defeat was the first time a Democratic Senate party leader lost re-election since Ernest McFarland's defeat in 1952 by Barry Goldwater. On November 12, 2024, Thune was elected leader of the Senate Republican Conference with an incoming Senate majority, making this seat the only seat in the United States Senate held back-to-back by a Senate majority leader of two different parties. This was the second election in which the candidates both served as party leaders in the Senate at some point, after Scott Lucas of Illinois lost to Everett Dirksen in 1950.

== General election ==
=== Candidates ===
- Tom Daschle, incumbent U.S. senator and Senate minority leader (Democratic)
- John Thune, former U.S. representative and nominee for U.S. Senate in 2002 (Republican)

=== Campaign ===
In the 2004 congressional elections, Daschle lost his seat to Republican challenger and former U.S. representative John Thune in a bitterly contested battle. Thune prevailed by a narrow margin of 4,508 votes (50.6–49.4%). Senate Majority Leader Bill Frist visited South Dakota to campaign for Thune, breaking an unwritten tradition that one party's leader in the Senate would not campaign directly for the other's defeat. Daschle's loss resulted in the first defeat of a Senate floor leader since 1952 when Arizona senator Ernest McFarland lost his seat to Barry Goldwater. Daschle was the only incumbent senator from either party to lose reelection in 2004.

Throughout the campaign, Thune, along with Frist, President George W. Bush, and Vice President Dick Cheney, frequently accused Daschle of being the "chief obstructionist" of Bush's agenda and charged him with using filibusters to block confirmation of several of Bush's nominees to the federal judiciary. Thune also used moral values such as issues surrounding same-sex marriage and abortion to convince South Dakota voters that Daschle's positions on such topics were out of sync with the state's residents. The Republican candidate also drove home his strong support for the president while blasting Daschle for his vehement opposition to Bush. He attempted to sway voters by remembering that Bush won South Dakota in a landslide in 2000 and had a very high job-approval rating among South Dakotans. His opponent, the Minority Leader, repeatedly argued that he was funneling money into South Dakota for vital federal highway and water pet projects.

Daschle responded to Thune's claim that he was a partisan anti-Bush obstructionist by pointing to his action just nine days after the September 11 attacks when he hugged President Bush on the Senate floor following Bush's address to Congress and the nation. He also hit back by alleging that Thune wanted to "rubber stamp what the administration is doing." Daschle's use of the video of his embrace of Bush forced the Republican National Committee to demand that the ad be pulled, claiming that it suggests that Bush endorses Daschle. Shortly following the airing of the ad, in a nationally televised debate on NBC's Meet the Press, Thune accused Daschle of "emboldening the enemy" in his skepticism of the Iraq War.

Daschle also noticeably relied very heavily on the power of incumbency to win a fourth term. Some also argued that Stephanie Herseth's election to the state's only House seat hurt Daschle, as voters may not have been comfortable sending an all-Democratic delegation to Congress for the first time in many decades. Accusations that Daschle was possibly considering no longer being an official resident of South Dakota were believed to have offended voters there. Others have analyzed that Daschle's lengthy consideration and eventual rejection of a potential run for the presidency in 2004 took a toll on South Dakotans, who felt betrayed and used by Daschle as a result.

When the race began in early 2004, Daschle led by seven points in January and February. By May, his lead minimized to just two points and into the summer polls showed a varying number of trends: either Daschle held a slim one to two-point lead, Thune held a slim one to two-point lead, or the race was tied. Throughout September, Daschle led Thune by margins of two to five percent. During the entire month of October into the November 2 election, most polls showed that Thune and Daschle were dead even, usually tied 49-49 among likely voters. Some polls showed either Thune or Daschle leading by extremely slim margins.

Thune is a onetime aide to Senator James Abdnor, the man Daschle defeated in 1986 to gain his seat in the Senate.

During Daschle's farewell address on November 19, 2004, he received a standing ovation from the Senate floor. His term as South Dakota's senator expired on January 3, 2005, with the commencement of the 109th Congress. Harry Reid took over as minority leader, and became majority leader in 2007.

=== Predictions ===
Source	Ranking	As of
Sabato's Crystal Ball	Lean R (flip)	November 1, 2004

=== Polling ===
Poll source	Date(s) administered	Sample size	Margin of error	John Thune (R)	Tom Daschle (D)	Undecided
Zogby International	October 25–26, 2004	800 (LV)	± 3.5%	48.5%	45.5%	6.0%
Rasmussen Reports	October 25, 2004	500 (LV)	± 4.5%	49%	46%	5%
McLaughlin & Associates (R)	October 21–24, 2004	400 (LV)	± 4.9%	48.5%	44.5%	6.0%
Mason-Dixon	October 19–21, 2004	800 (RV)	± 3.5%	47%	49%	4%
Rasmussen Reports	October 12, 2004	500 (LV)	± 4.5%	49%	49%	2%
Rasmussen Reports	September 29, 2004	500 (LV)	± 4.5%	50%	46%	4%
Zogby International	September 24–28, 2004	506 (LV)	± 4.5%	45.5%	47.8%	6.7%
Public Opinion Strategies (R)	September 21–22, 2002	600 (LV)	± 4.0%	50%	47%	3%
Mason-Dixon	September 20–22, 2004	800 (RV)	± 3.5%	45%	50%	5%
Rasmussen Reports	September 8, 2004	500 (LV)	± 4.5%	50%	47%	3%
Greenberg Quinlan Rosner Research (D)	August 25–30, 2004	600 (LV)	± 4.0%	45%	53%	2%
Public Opinion Strategies (R)	August 24–26, 2002	500 (LV)	± 4.4%	50%	48%	2%
McLaughlin & Associates (R)	August 11–12, 2004	400 (V)	± 4.9%	45.0%	48.3%	6.7%
Zogby International	May 19–20, 2004	503 (LV)	± 4.5%	39%	52%	9%
Greenberg Quinlan Rosner Research (D)	May 11–12, 2004	506 (RV)	± 4.4%	42%	55%	4%
Mason-Dixon	May 10–12, 2004	800 (RV)	± 3.5%	47%	49%	4%
Zogby International	March 27–28, 2004	501 (LV)	± 4.5%	42.6%	48.2%	9.2%
Rasmussen Reports	February 11, 2004	500 (LV)	± 4.5%	45%	48%	7%
Mason-Dixon	February 5–7, 2004	800 (RV)	± 3.5%	43%	50%	7%
Mason-Dixon	Oct 31–Nov 2, 2003	400 (LV)	± 5%	44%	50%	6%
Mason-Dixon	August 26–27, 2003	400 (LV)	± 5%	46%	48%	6%
McLaughlin & Associates (R)	July 16–17, 2003	400 (V)	± 4.9%	45.7%	46.6%	7.7%
Fabrizio, McLaughlin & Associates (R)	July 7–10, 2003	400 (V)	± 4.9%	40%	46%	14%
McLaughlin & Associates (R)	March 23–24, 2003	400 (LV)	± 4.9%	46%	44%	10%
Fabrizio, McLaughlin & Associates (R)	February 22–25, 2003		± 3.1%	45%	45%	10%
Public Opinion Strategies (R)	November 20–21, 2002	500 (LV)	± 4.3%	45%	46%	9%
Mason-Dixon	July 2002	400 (V)	± 5%	46%	48%	6%

== Results ==
General election results
Party	Candidate	Votes	%	±%
Republican	John Thune	197,848	50.58%	+14.17%
Democratic	Tom Daschle (incumbent)	193,340	49.42%	−12.72%
Total votes		391,188	100.00%	N/A
Republican gain from Democratic				

=== Counties that flipped from Democratic to Republican ===
- Douglas (largest city: Armour)
- Union (largest city: Dakota Dunes)
- Hutchinson (largest city: Parkston)
- Lincoln (largest city: Sioux Falls)
- Turner (largest city: Parker)
- Butte (largest city: Belle Fourche)
- Perkins (largest city: Belle Fourche)
- Tripp (largest city: Winner)
- Fall River (largest city: Hot Springs)
- Lawrence (largest city: Spearfish)
- Meade (largest city: Sturgis)
- Pennington (largest city: Rapid City)
- Gregory (largest city: Gregory)
- Stanley (largest city: Fort Pierre)
- Sully (largest city: Onida)
- Hughes (largest city: Pierre)
- Hyde (largest city: Highmore)
- McPherson (largest city: Eureka)
- Potter (largest city: Gettysburg)
- Walworth (largest city: Mobridge)
- Campbell (largest city: Herreid)
- Hanson (largest city: Alexandria)
- Codington (largest city: Watertown)
- Davison (largest city: Mitchell)
- Hamlin (largest city: Estelline)
- McCook (largest city: Salem)

== See also ==
- 2004 United States Senate elections
