= William Joseph Lynch =

American judge

Judge of the United States District Court for the Northern District of Illinois
- In office March 7, 1966 – August 9, 1976
- Appointed by: Lyndon B. Johnson
- Preceded by: Michael L. Igoe
- Succeeded by: Nicholas John Bua

Personal details
- Born: William Joseph Lynch; June 6, 1908 Chicago, Illinois
- Died: August 9, 1976 (aged 68) Chicago, Illinois
- Education: Loyola University Chicago School of Law (LL.B.)

William Joseph Lynch (June 6, 1908 – August 9, 1976) was a United States district judge of the United States District Court for the Northern District of Illinois.

== Education and career ==
Born in Chicago, Illinois, on June 6, 1908, Lynch received a Bachelor of Laws from Loyola University Chicago School of Law in 1931 and entered private practice in Chicago. He was an Assistant State's Attorney from 1933 to 1938, when he returned to private practice. During World War II he served in the United States Navy from 1942 to 1946, when he once again returned to private practice. He was a member of the Illinois Senate from 1950 to 1957, serving as Minority Leader from 1953 to 1957.

== Federal judicial service ==
Lynch was nominated by President Lyndon B. Johnson on January 19, 1966, to a seat on the United States District Court for the Northern District of Illinois vacated by Judge Michael L. Igoe. He was confirmed on March 4, 1966, and received his commission on March 7, 1966. Lynch remained on the court until his death on August 9, 1976, in Chicago.

== Sources ==
Legal offices
Preceded by Michael L. Igoe	Judge of the United States District Court for the Northern District of Illinois; 1966–1976	Succeeded by Nicholas John Bua
