= 1938 United States Senate election in Illinois =

- November 8, 1938
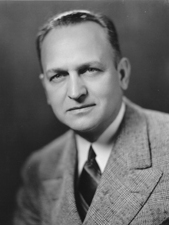

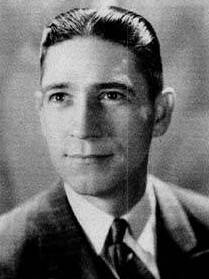
Nominee	Scott W. Lucas	Richard J. Lyons
Party	Democratic	Republican
Popular vote	1,638,162	1,542,574
Percentage	51.32%	48.33%
- County results Lucas: 50–60% 60–70% Lyons: 40–50% 50–60% 60–70% 70–80%
U.S. senator before election
William H. Dieterich
Democratic
Elected U.S. senator
Scott W. Lucas
Democratic

The 1938 United States Senate election in Illinois took place on November 8, 1938. Incumbent first-term Democrat William H. Dieterich retired. Fellow Democrat Scott W. Lucas was elected to succeed him.

== Background ==
The primaries and general election coincided with those for House and those for state elections.

Primaries were held April 12, 1938.

== Democratic primary ==
=== Candidates ===
- Michael L. Igoe, United States Attorney for the Northern District of Illinois and former U.S. representative at-large
- Newton Jenkins, perennial candidate
- Albert Lagerstedt, former member of the Minnesota House of Representatives
- Scott W. Lucas, U.S. representative from Havana and candidate for U.S. Senate in 1932
- John J. Sullivan, resident of New Lenox

=== Results ===
Democratic primary
Party	Candidate	Votes	%
Democratic	Scott W. Lucas	801,761	49.92
Democratic	Michael L. Igoe	726,477	45.23
Democratic	Newton Jenkins	32,808	2.04
Democratic	John J. Sullivan	31,964	1.99
Democratic	Albert Lagerstedt	13,236	0.82
Total votes		1,606,246	100

== Republican primary ==
=== Candidates ===
- William J. Baker
- Richard J. Lyons, state representative from Libertyville
- Clarence P. Parker

=== Results ===
Republican primary
Party	Candidate	Votes	%
Republican	Richard J. Lyons	505,659	73.51
Republican	William J. Baker	105,482	15.33
Republican	Clarence P. Parker	76,784	1.12
Total votes		687,925	100

== General election ==
=== Candidates ===
- Enoch A. Holtwick, Greenville College history professor, temperance activist, and perennial candidate (Prohibition)
- Scott W. Lucas, U.S. representative from Havana (Democratic)
- Richard J. Lyons, state representative from Libertyville (Republican)

=== Results ===
1938 United States Senate election in Illinois
Party	Candidate	Votes	%
Democratic	Scott W. Lucas	1,638,162	51.32%
Republican	Richard J. Lyons	1,542,574	48.33%
Prohibition	Enoch A. Holtwick	10,707	0.34%
None	Scattering	569	0.02%
Majority		95,588	2.99%
Turnout		3,192,012	
Democratic hold			

== See also ==
- 1938 United States Senate elections
