= Walter Nesbit =

American politician

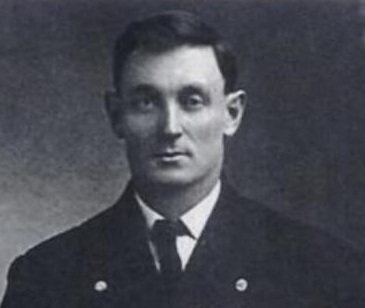

Member of the U.S. House of Representatives from Illinois's at-large district
- In office March 4, 1933 – January 3, 1935
- Preceded by: Richard Yates Jr.
- Succeeded by: Michael L. Igoe

Personal details
- Born: May 1, 1878 Belleville, Illinois
- Died: December 6, 1938 (aged 60) Belleville, Illinois
- Party: Democratic

Walter Nesbit (May 1, 1878 – December 6, 1938) was a U.S. representative from Illinois.

Born in Belleville, St. Clair County, Illinois, Nesbit attended the grade and night schools. He was employed as a coal miner from 1892 to 1912. He held various offices in the United Mine Workers of America, serving as subdistrict secretary from 1912 to 1915, as traveling auditor from 1915 to 1917, and as secretary-treasurer of district No. 12 from 1917 to 1933.

Nesbit was elected as a Democrat to the Seventy-third Congress (March 4, 1933 – January 3, 1935). He was an unsuccessful candidate for renomination in 1934. He owned and operated the Club Congress in Belleville, Illinois. He was an unsuccessful candidate for sheriff of St. Clair County, Illinois, in 1938. He died in Belleville, Illinois on December 6, 1938. He was interred in Green Mount Cemetery.

U.S. House of Representatives
Preceded by Richard Yates Jr.	Member of the U.S. House of Representatives from Illinois's at-large congressional district 1933–1935	Succeeded by Michael L. Igoe
