= Allen T. Lucas =

American lawyer and politician

Member of the Illinois House of Representatives

Personal details
- Party: Democratic

Allen Thurman Lucas (July 20, 1917 — November 18, 1973) was an American lawyer and politician.

Lucas was born in Chandlerville, Illinois. He went to the Chandlerville public schools and graduated from Chandlerville High School in 1935, then attended Phillips Exeter Academy. He graduated with a bachelor of arts in 1940 from the University of Illinois, and attended Northwestern University and DePaul University. He received a juris doctorate in 1948. He was commissioned as an ensign in the United States Navy Reserve in 1942 and became a lieutenant commander in 1951.

Lucas was admitted to the Illinois bar in 1948 and he practiced law with his uncle Scott W. Lucas who served in the United States Senate. He served in the Illinois House of Representatives from 1955 to 1969 and was a Democrat. He died at St. John's Hospital in Springfield, Illinois.
