= Nicholas John Bua =

American judge

Nicholas Bua
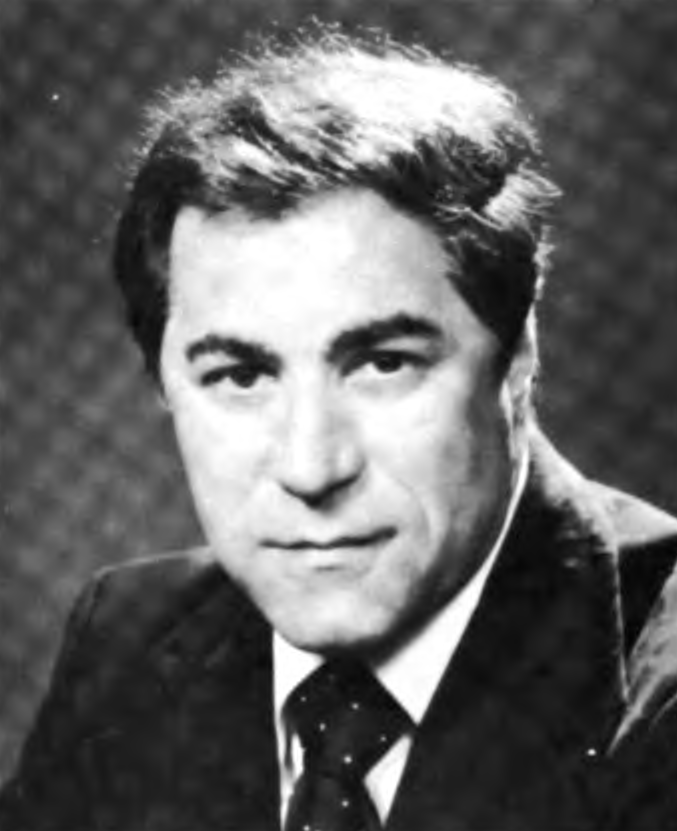

Judge of the United States District Court for the Northern District of Illinois
- In office October 11, 1977 – November 4, 1991
- Appointed by: Jimmy Carter
- Preceded by: William Joseph Lynch
- Succeeded by: Rubén Castillo

Personal details
- Born: Nicholas John Bua; February 9, 1925; Chicago, Illinois
- Died: November 1, 2002 (aged 77); Melrose Park, Illinois, U.S.
- Political party: Democratic
- Education: DePaul University (JD)

Nicholas John Bua (February 9, 1925 – November 1, 2002) was a United States district judge of the United States District Court for the Northern District of Illinois.

== Education and career ==
Born in Chicago, Illinois, Bua was in the United States Army in 1943. He received a Juris Doctor from DePaul University College of Law in 1953. He was in private practice in Chicago from 1953 to 1963. He was the Presiding Judge of the Melrose Park Village Court in Illinois in 1963. He was an Associate Judge of the Circuit Court of Cook County, Law Division, County Department, in Illinois from 1964 to 1971. He was a Circuit Court Judge of Cook County, Illinois from 1971 to 1976. He was a justice of the Appellate Court of the State of Illinois First District from 1976 to 1977. He was the special counsel for the Inslaw case from 1991 to 1993. He was in private practice in Chicago from 1991 to 2002.

== Federal judicial service ==
Bua was a federal judge on the United States District Court for the Northern District of Illinois. Bua was nominated by President Jimmy Carter on July 19, 1977, to a seat on the United States District Court for the Northern District of Illinois vacated by Judge William Joseph Lynch. He was confirmed by the United States Senate on October 7, 1977, and received his commission on October 11, 1977. Bua served in that capacity until November 4, 1991, due to retirement.

== Death ==
Bua died on November 1, 2002, in Melrose Park, Illinois. Survived by his wife Camille, daughter Lisa Krinch (Scott) and grandchildren Nicole & Scott Krinch Jr.

== See also ==
- Italians in Chicago

== Sources ==
Legal offices
Preceded by William Joseph Lynch	Judge of the United States District Court for the Northern District of Illinois; 1977–1991	Succeeded by Rubén Castillo
