= Thomas Vernor Smith =

American politician

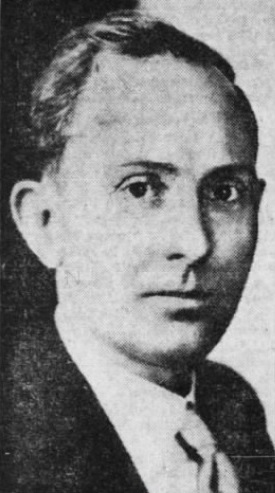
- The Star Press (Muncie, IN), June 7, 1938

Member of the U.S. House of Representatives from Illinois's at-large district
- In office January 3, 1939 – January 3, 1941
- Preceded by: Lewis M. Long
- Succeeded by: William Stratton

Member of the Illinois Senate
- In office 1935-1938

Personal details
- Born: April 26, 1890 Blanket, Texas
- Died: May 24, 1964 (aged 74) Hyattsville, Maryland
- Party: Democratic

Thomas Vernor Smith (April 26, 1890 – May 24, 1964), who wrote under the byline T. V. Smith, was an American philosopher, scholar, and politician from Illinois, as well as an officer in the United States Army.

== Biography ==
Smith was born in a log cabin in Blanket, Texas, on April 26, 1890. He graduated from the University of Texas at Austin in 1915, and from the University of Chicago in 1922. Smith entered the Army during World War I and served as a private until discharged on January 28, 1919.

Smith was a member of the faculty of Texas Christian University from 1916 to 1918. After his military service, he resumed his academic career in philosophy at the University of Texas from 1919 to 1921, and he served as a dean and a teacher of philosophy at the University of Chicago from 1922 to 1948. He earned a doctorate from the University of Chicago. His dissertation was "The American Doctrine of Equality." He authored numerous books, many articles, and served as editor of the International Journal of Ethics from 1931 to 1948. Smith began his political career as a member of the Illinois State Senate from 1935 until 1938, during which he authored a number of bills to aimed at reforming the legislative process. He was the chairman of the Illinois Legislative Council in 1937 and 1938. Smith was subsequently elected as a Democrat to the Seventy-sixth United States Congress, from January 3, 1939, through January 3, 1941. Smith failed to be reelected in 1940 for another term. He subsequently published an article titled "Is Congress Any Good, Anyhow?" His response to the question he posed was that in spite of "its pestiferous ways, yes, Congress is some good."

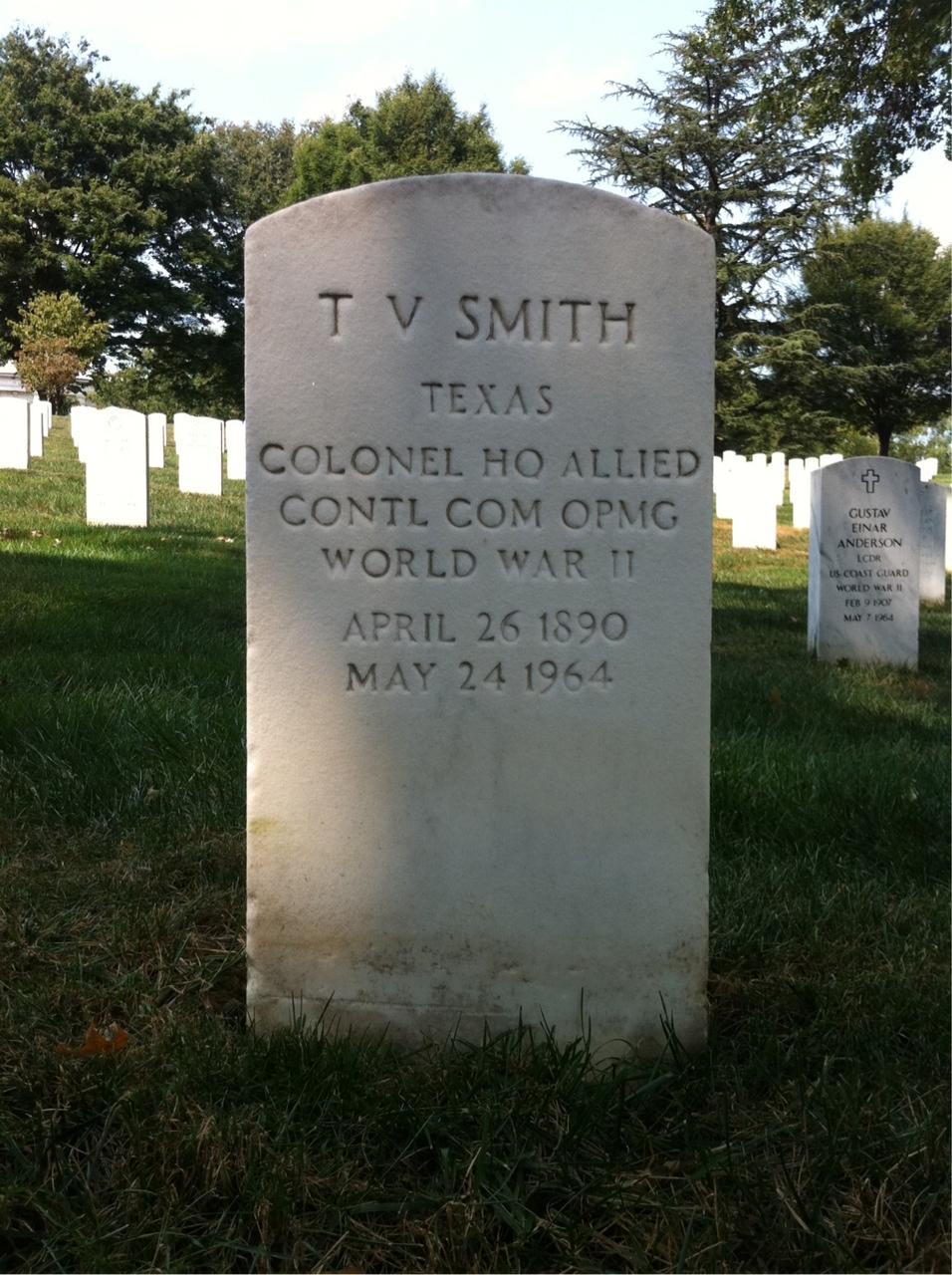
Smith's grave at Arlington National Cemetery

During World War II, Smith returned to the Army as a lieutenant colonel and later as a colonel, serving from 1943 to 1946. He was the director of education of the Allied Control Commission in Italy from November 24, 1943, to November 11, 1944. The Italian scholar and translator, Thomas G. Bergin worked under Colonel Smith in Salerno immediately after the Nazi army had retreated towards northern Italy. Bergin described his experience with Smith, saying. "I could not have wished for a more inspiring or sympathetic chief." Bergin described the purposes of the Education Sub-Commission under Smith in war-torn Italy were to provide first aid and defascistization to the school system, then to hand the administration back to the Italian Government: "The readjustment in educational matters … called for patience, tact and good will on both sides. Col Smith had all those virtues." Adding to the challenges, nearby Mount Vesuvius awoke with one of its most violent eruptions, which overwhelmed five towns. Smith was charged with responsibilities of organizing military efforts to track and mitigate the disaster.

In 1948, Smith resumed his profession as a writer and teacher at the Syracuse University until his retirement in 1959. Smith married Nannie Stewart, they had two children, a son Gayle and a daughter Nancy. He resided in Hyattsville, Maryland, until his death there on May 24, 1964, Smith is interred at Arlington National Cemetery.

U.S. House of Representatives
Preceded by Lewis M. Long	Member of the U.S. House of Representatives from Illinois's at-large congressional district 1939-1941	Succeeded by William Stratton
