= Lewis M. Long =

American politician

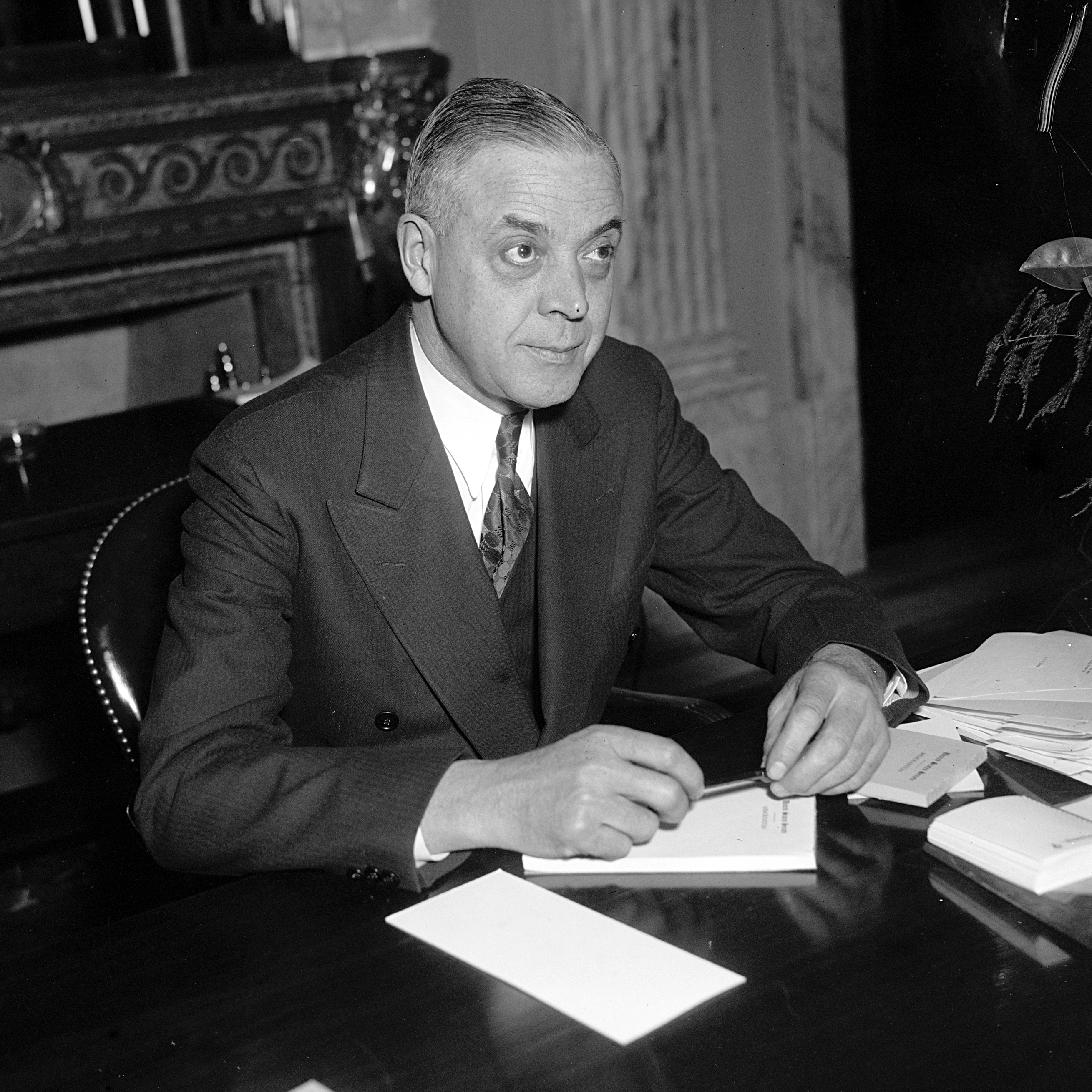

Member of the U.S. House of Representatives from Illinois's at-large district
- In office January 3, 1937 – January 3, 1939
- Preceded by: Michael L. Igoe
- Succeeded by: Thomas Vernor Smith

Personal details
- Born: June 22, 1883 Gardner, Illinois, U.S.
- Died: September 9, 1957 (aged 74) Sandwich, Illinois, U.S.
- Party: Democratic

Lewis Marshall Long (June 22, 1883 – September 9, 1957) was a U.S. representative from Illinois.

Born in Gardner, Illinois, Long attended the public schools of Aurora, Illinois, the Plano (Illinois) High School, and the University of Illinois. He graduated from the John Marshall Law School, Chicago, Illinois, in 1929. He was employed as a telegraph operator and station agent at Plano, Illinois, and Sandwich, Illinois from 1904 to 1930. He was admitted to the bar in 1930 and commenced practice in Sandwich, Illinois. He served as member of the board of aldermen from 1922 to 1926. He served as mayor of Sandwich in 1935 and 1936. He served as member of the board of education from 1932 to 1936.

Long was elected as a Democrat to the Seventy-fifth Congress (January 3, 1937 – January 3, 1939). He was an unsuccessful candidate for renomination in 1938 and for election in 1940 to the Seventy-seventh Congress. He resumed the practice of law. He served as chief examiner of the Division of Motor Carriers of the State of Illinois from November 1, 1939, to July 1, 1941, when he resigned to engage in motor carrier practice in addition to law practice. He died in Sandwich, Illinois on September 9, 1957. He was interred in Oak Ridge Cemetery.

U.S. House of Representatives
Preceded by Michael L. Igoe	Member of the U.S. House of Representatives from Illinois's at-large congressional district 1937-1939	Succeeded by Thomas V. Smith
