= Edwin V. Champion =

American politician

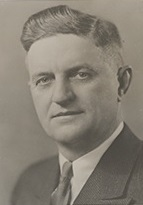

Member of the U.S. House of Representatives from Illinois's at-large district
- In office January 3, 1937 – January 3, 1939
- Preceded by: Martin A. Brennan
- Succeeded by: John C. Martin

Personal details
- Born: September 18, 1890 Mansfield, Illinois, U.S.
- Died: February 11, 1976 (aged 85) Peoria, Illinois, U.S.
- Party: Democratic

Edwin Van Meter Champion (September 18, 1890 – February 11, 1976) was a U.S. Representative from Illinois.

Born in Mansfield, Illinois, Champion attended the public schools. He was graduated from the law department of the University of Illinois, 1912. He was admitted to the bar the same year and commenced practice in Peoria, Illinois.

During the First World War, Champion entered the Officers' Training Camp at Fort Sheridan, Illinois, on May 15, 1917. He was commissioned a second lieutenant and assigned to service overseas with the Three Hundred and Forty-first Infantry, Company C, Eighty-sixth Division. He was discharged with rank of captain on February 6, 1919. Champion served as assistant State's attorney of Peoria County, Illinois, in 1919 and 1920 and as State's attorney from 1932 to 1936. He served as president of the Illinois State's Attorneys' Association in 1935.

Champion was elected as a Democrat to the Seventy-fifth Congress (January 3, 1937 – January 3, 1939). He was not a candidate for renomination in 1938 to the Seventy-sixth Congress. After leaving Congress, he resumed the practice of law in Peoria, Illinois, where he died on February 11, 1976. He was buried in Springdale Mausoleum.

U.S. House of Representatives
| Preceded by Martin A. Brennan | Member of the U.S. House of Representatives from Illinois's at-large congressional district 1937–1939 | Succeeded by John C. Martin |
