= William H. Dieterich =

American politician (1876–1940)

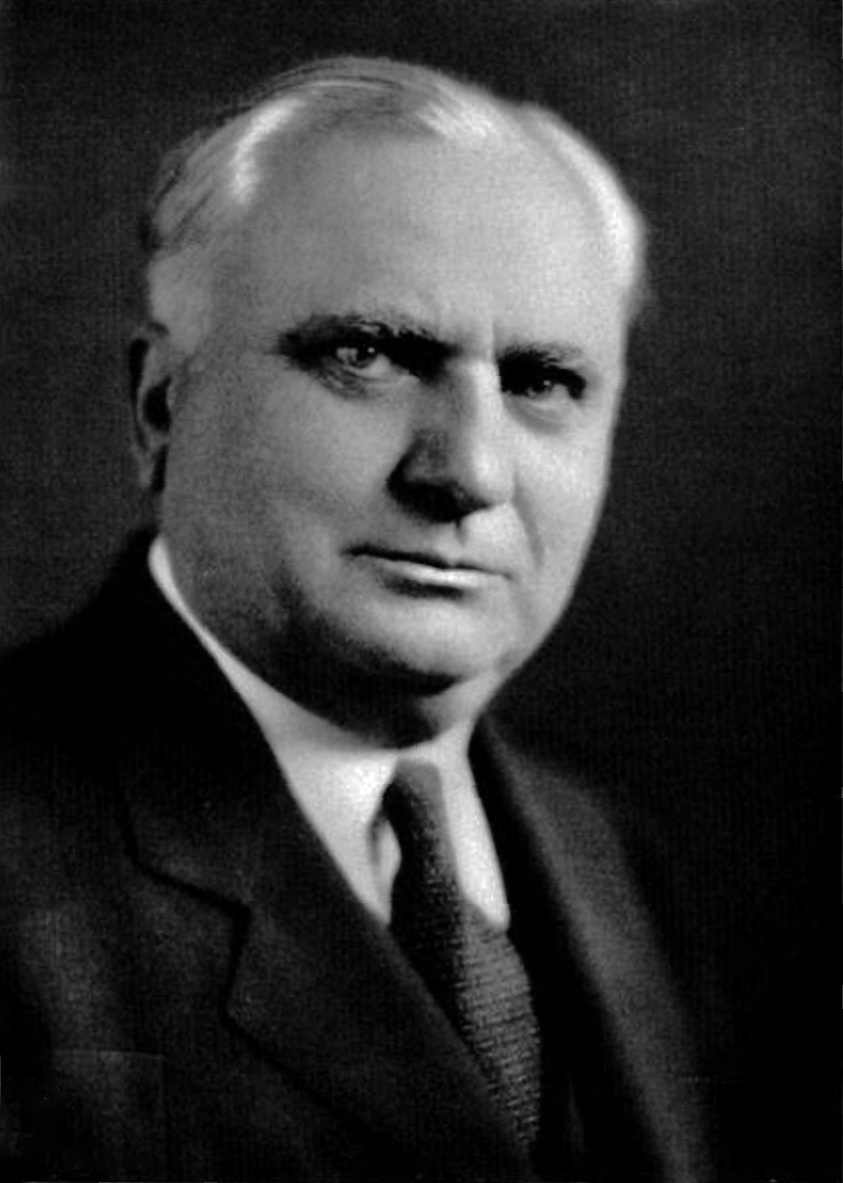
- Dieterich, c. 1934

United States Senator from Illinois
- In office March 4, 1933 – January 3, 1939
- Preceded by: Otis F. Glenn
- Succeeded by: Scott W. Lucas

Member of the U.S. House of Representatives from Illinois's at-large district
- In office March 4, 1931 – March 3, 1933
- Preceded by: Ruth H. McCormick
- Succeeded by: Martin A. Brennan

Member of the Illinois House of Representatives
- In office 1917-1921

Personal details
- Born: William Henry Dieterich; March 31, 1876 Cooperstown, Illinois, U.S.
- Died: October 12, 1940 (aged 64) Springfield, Illinois, U.S.
- Party: Democratic
- Spouse: Nona Snyder Runkle

William Henry Dieterich (March 31, 1876 – October 12, 1940) was an American lawyer and Democratic politician from Illinois. He was a state legislator, U.S. representative, and U.S. senator

== Biography ==
He was born near Cooperstown, Illinois. After graduating from Kennedy Business College in 1897 and Northern Indiana Law School in 1901, Dieterich was admitted to the bar and began to practice in Rushville, Illinois. During the Spanish–American War, he served as a corporal.

He was city attorney for Rushville, 1903–1907; treasurer of Rushville Union Schools 1906–1908; and county judge of Schuyler County, 1906–1910.

In 1911 he moved to Chicago, and then in 1912 to Beardstown, Illinois, in Cass County, adjacent to Schuyler, where he continued his law practice.

In 1916, he was elected to the Illinois House of Representatives, and re-elected in 1918, serving from 1917 to 1921.

In 1930, he was elected U.S. Representative from one of Illinois' two at-large seats, finishing ahead of both Republicans and the other Democrat. He served only one term.

In 1932, he declined re-nomination to the House, and instead ran for U.S. Senator. He defeated incumbent Republican Otis Glenn 52% to 46%.

He served one term, from 1933 to 1939. He did not run for re-election in 1938, instead returning to his law practice. He died in Springfield, Illinois during a business trip.

Party political offices
Preceded by Anton Cermak	Democratic nominee for U.S. Senator from Illinois (Class 3); 1932	Succeeded by Scott W. Lucas
U.S. House of Representatives
Preceded by Ruth H. McCormick	Member of the U.S. House of Representatives from Illinois's at-large congressional district March 4, 1931 – March 3, 1933	Succeeded by Martin A. Brennan
U.S. Senate
Preceded by Otis F. Glenn	U.S. senator (Class 3) from Illinois; 1933–1939; Served alongside: J. Hamilton Lewis	Succeeded by Scott W. Lucas
