= Martin A. Brennan =

American politician

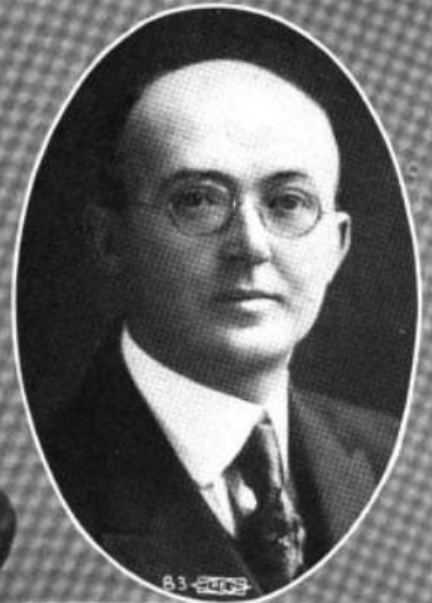

Member of the U.S. House of Representatives from Illinois's at-large district
- In office March 4, 1933 – January 3, 1937
- Preceded by: William H. Dieterich
- Succeeded by: Edwin V. Champion

Member of the Illinois House of Representatives
- In office 1921-1923

Personal details
- Born: Martin Adlai Brennan; September 21, 1879 Bloomington, Illinois
- Died: July 4, 1941 (aged 61) Bloomington, Illinois
- Party: Democratic

Martin Adlai Brennan (September 21, 1879 – July 4, 1941) was a U.S. Representative from Illinois.

Born in Bloomington, McLean County, Illinois, Brennan attended parochial schools. He was employed as a reporter for the Bloomington Bulletin. He was graduated from the Illinois Wesleyan University in Bloomington, Illinois, in 1902. He was admitted to the bar the same year and commenced practice in Bloomington, Illinois. He served as presiding judge of the Illinois Court of Claims from 1913 to 1917. He served as census supervisor for McLean County, Illinois, in 1920. He served as member of the State House of Representatives from 1921 to 1923. He served as delegate to the Democratic National Convention in 1924.

Brennan was elected as a Democrat to the Seventy-third and Seventy-fourth Congresses (March 4, 1933 – January 3, 1937). He was not a candidate for renomination in 1936. He resumed the practice of law in Bloomington, Illinois, until his death there on July 4, 1941. He was interred in St. Mary's Cemetery.

U.S. House of Representatives
Preceded by William H. Dieterich	Member of the U.S. House of Representatives from Illinois's at-large congressional district March 4, 1933 – January 3, 1937	Succeeded by Edwin V. Champion
