= 1944 United States Senate election in Illinois =

- November 7, 1944
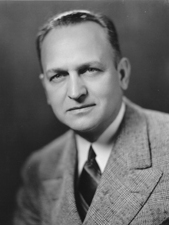

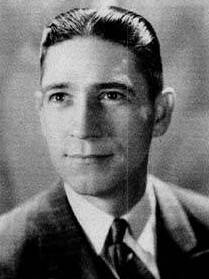
Nominee	Scott W. Lucas	Richard J. Lyons
Party	Democratic	Republican
Popular vote	2,059,023	1,841,793
Percentage	52.61%	47.06%
- County results Lucas: 40–50% 50–60% 60–70% Lyons: 40–50% 50–60% 60–70% 70–80%
Senator before election
Scott W. Lucas
Democratic
Elected Senator
Scott W. Lucas
Democratic

The 1944 United States Senate election in Illinois was held on November 7, 1944 to elect one of Illinois's members to the United States Senate. Incumbent Democratic U.S. Senator Scott W. Lucas won reelection to a second term.

The race between Lucas and Republican Richard J. Lyons was a rematch of their 1938 United States Senate race six years prior.

== Background ==
The primaries and general election coincided with those for federal offices (President and House) and state elections.

Primaries were held on April 11.

== Democratic primary ==
=== Candidates ===
- Scott W. Lucas, incumbent U.S. senator since 1939

=== Results ===
Democratic primary
Party	Candidate	Votes	%
Democratic	Scott W. Lucas (incumbent)	532,358	100
Write-in		3	0.01
Total votes		532,361	100

== Republican primary ==
=== Candidates ===
- William J. Baker
- Richard J. Lyons, former state representative from Libertyville and nominee for U.S. senator in 1938
- Deenan A. Watson

=== Results ===
Republican primary
Party	Candidate	Votes	%
Republican	Richard J. Lyons	536,030	79.02
Republican	Deenen A. Watson	85,004	12.53
Republican	William J. Baker	57,330	8.51
Write-in		4	0.00
Total votes		678,368	100

== General election ==
=== Candidates ===
- Enoch A. Holtwick, Greenville College history professor, temperance activist, and perennial candidate (Prohibition)
- Scott W. Lucas, incumbent U.S. senator since 1939 (Democratic)
- Richard J. Lyons, former state representative from Libertyville and nominee for U.S. senator in 1938 (Republican)
- Frank Schnur (Socialist Labor)

=== Results ===
General election
Party	Candidate	Votes	%
Democratic	Scott W. Lucas (incumbent)	2,059,023	52.61
Republican	Richard J. Lyons	1,841,793	47.06
Socialist Labor	Frank Schnur	7,312	0.19
Prohibition	Enoch A. Holtwick	5,798	0.15
Total votes		3,913,926	100

== See also ==
- 1944 United States Senate elections
