= Richard Yates Jr. =

Governor of Illinois from 1901 to 1905

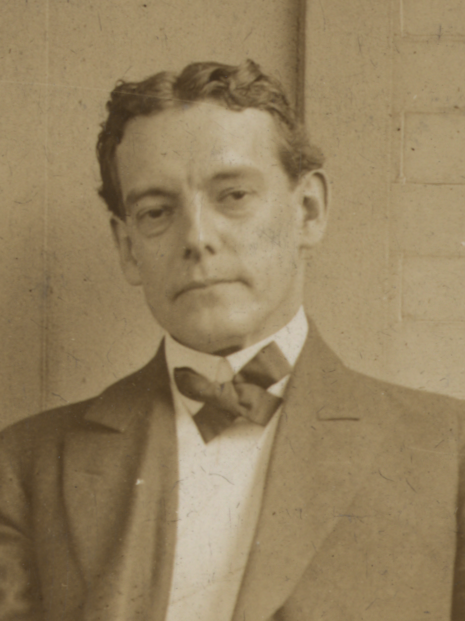
- Yates in 1901

22nd Governor of Illinois
- In office January 14, 1901 – January 9, 1905
- Lieutenant: William A. Northcott
- Preceded by: John R. Tanner
- Succeeded by: Charles S. Deneen

Member of the U.S. House of Representatives from Illinois's at-large district
- In office March 4, 1919 – March 4, 1933
- Preceded by: Medill McCormick
- Succeeded by: Walter Nesbit

Member of the Illinois House of Representatives

Personal details
- Born: December 12, 1860 Jacksonville, Illinois, U.S.
- Died: April 11, 1936 (aged 75) Springfield, Illinois, U.S.
- Party: Republican
- Spouse: Helen Wadsworth
- Children: 5
- Education: Illinois College; University of Michigan
- Occupation: Attorney; County judge
- Profession: Politician
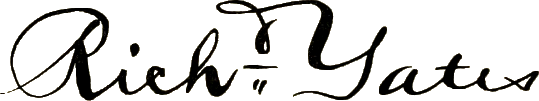
- Signature

Military service
- Branch/service: United States National Guard
- Years of service: 1885–1890
- Rank: Private
- Unit: Illinois

Richard Yates Jr. (December 12, 1860 – April 11, 1936) was the 22nd governor of Illinois from 1901 to 1905—the first native-born governor of the state. From 1919 to 1933, he served in the U.S. House of Representatives from Illinois.

== Early life and career ==
His father, also Richard Yates, was also an Illinois politician; indeed, the senior Yates was Illinois' popular Civil War governor, and the younger Yates spent a portion of his boyhood living in the Executive Mansion in Springfield, which would one day again be his home. The son was born in Jacksonville, Illinois on December 12, 1860. He attended public schools and, from 1870 to 1874, the Illinois Woman's College (now MacMurray College). He was the city editor of the Daily Courier in 1878 and 1879, and of the Daily Journal from 1881 to 1883. Yates graduated from Illinois College in Jacksonville in 1880 and from the law department of the University of Michigan at Ann Arbor in 1884. Yates served as a private in Company I, Fifth Infantry, Illinois National Guard from 1885 to 1890. He married Ellen Wadsworth in 1888.

He practiced law in Jacksonville and was city attorney of Jacksonville 1885–1890 and county judge of Morgan County 1894–1897. From 1897 to 1900, Yates was United States collector of internal revenue for the eighth internal revenue district.

== Governor ==
In 1900, Yates was elected governor in his own right while he was not yet 40 years of age. He began his campaign as a "dark horse" under the cloak of neutrality, which won him support from Senator Shelby Moore Cullom's "federal crowd". Congressman William Lorimer, who had backed another candidate in a field of well-known men, suddenly switched at the Republican convention, grabbing up a Yates banner and proceeding to stampede the convention. The results of the third ballot were never announced; Yates was then nominated on the fourth. The subsequent, decisive election sent Yates to the governor's chair by 61,233 votes over Democrat Samuel Alschuler of Aurora.

The keynote legislation signed during the governorship of Richard Yates was a new child labor law, the first of its kind in any state, restricting the work week of children to no more than 48 hours. Another significant move of the administration was the signing of a bill permitting municipal ownership of street railways. Yates restricted prison industries, but vetoed a bill calling for a centralized audit of all state agencies. The veto is significant in light of the Chicago press of the day. Highly critical of the stylish governor, who retained the parade pomp of John Tanner and his "sunburst colonels", Chicago newspapers alleged that Yates Jr. was compelling state employees to contribute to a slush fund. Further accusations had it that campaign work was compulsory for state employees under Yates.

In 1904, Yates was the first Republican West of the Ohio to declare for Theodore Roosevelt. Yates, despite being a sitting governor, did not receive his party's nomination in 1904; he led the field of six candidates for 58 ballots, before throwing his support behind State's Attorney Charles S. Deneen in order to prevent the nomination of Frank O. Lowden, Yates' chief rival at the convention.

== Interim period ==
In his years prior to Congress, Yates was popular on the Chautauqua circuit. In the 1906–07 United States Senate election, Yates challenged incumbent Shelby Moore Cullom for the Republican nomination. Yates lost the primary and subsequently the Republican caucuses of both houses of the Illinois General Assembly renominated Cullom as the Republican candidate. Governor Edward Fitzsimmons Dunne appointed Yates to the Board of Public Utilities. In 1918, he served as an assistant attorney general in the Office of the Illinois Attorney General.

== Congress ==
He was elected to Congress in 1918. Although he failed to receive his party's nomination in 1928 to the Seventy-first Congress, he was later appointed nominee and elected in place of Henry R. Rathbone who died prior to the election. In 1932, he was unsuccessful in his bid for reelection to the Seventy-third Congress. His final act of service was to cast a vote in 1933 against the repeal of the 18th Amendment. After leaving Congress, Yates resided in Harbor Springs, Michigan, and Springfield, Illinois, while writing his memoirs. He died in Springfield on April 11, 1936, and was buried in Diamond Grove Cemetery, Jacksonville.

Party political offices
| Preceded by John Riley Tanner | Republican nominee for Governor of Illinois; 1900 | Succeeded by Charles S. Deneen |
Political offices
| Preceded by John R. Tanner | Governor of Illinois; 1901–1905 | Succeeded by Charles S. Deneen |
U.S. House of Representatives
| Preceded by Medill McCormick | Member of the U.S. House of Representatives from Illinois's at-large district 1919–1933 | Succeeded by Walter Nesbit |
