= Richard J. Lyons =

American politician and lawyer

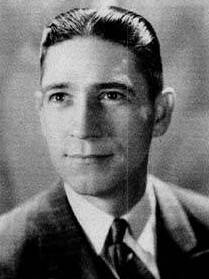
Official portrait, 1937

Richard J. Lyons (May 9, 1895 – March 13, 1959) was an American politician and lawyer.

Lyons was born in Chicago, Illinois. He went to the Chicago public schools and then received his law degree from John Marshall Law School in Chicago. He lived in Libertyville, Illinois, with his wife and family. Lyons was involved with the Republican Party. In the 1938 and 1944, Lyon ran for United States Senator against Scott W. Lucas, losing both elections to Lucas. In 1940. Lyons ran against Illinois Governor Dwight H. Green for the Republican nomination for governor and lost the election. He served on the Mundelein, Illinois, Village Board. Lyons served in the Illinois House of Representatives from 1929 to 1939. He then served on the Illinois Tax Commission from 1941 to 1943. Lyons served as deputy director of the Illinois Department of Revenue from 1943 to 1949. Lyons served as director of the Illinois Department of Revenue from 1953 until his death in 1959. Lyons died from a heart attack at his home in Libertyville, Illinois.

== Notes ==
Illinois House of Representatives
Preceded by William F. Weiss; Roy J. Stewart	Member of the Illinois House of Representatives from the 8th district 1929–1939; Served alongside: Noyes L. Jackson, Lee McDonough, William M. Carroll, Thomas A. Bolger, Nick Keller	Succeeded by Harold D. Kelsey
Party political offices
Preceded by Otis F. Glenn	Republican nominee for U.S. Senator from Illinois (Class 3); 1938, 1944	Succeeded by Everett Dirksen
