= Scott W. Lucas =

American politician (1892–1968)

Scott Lucas
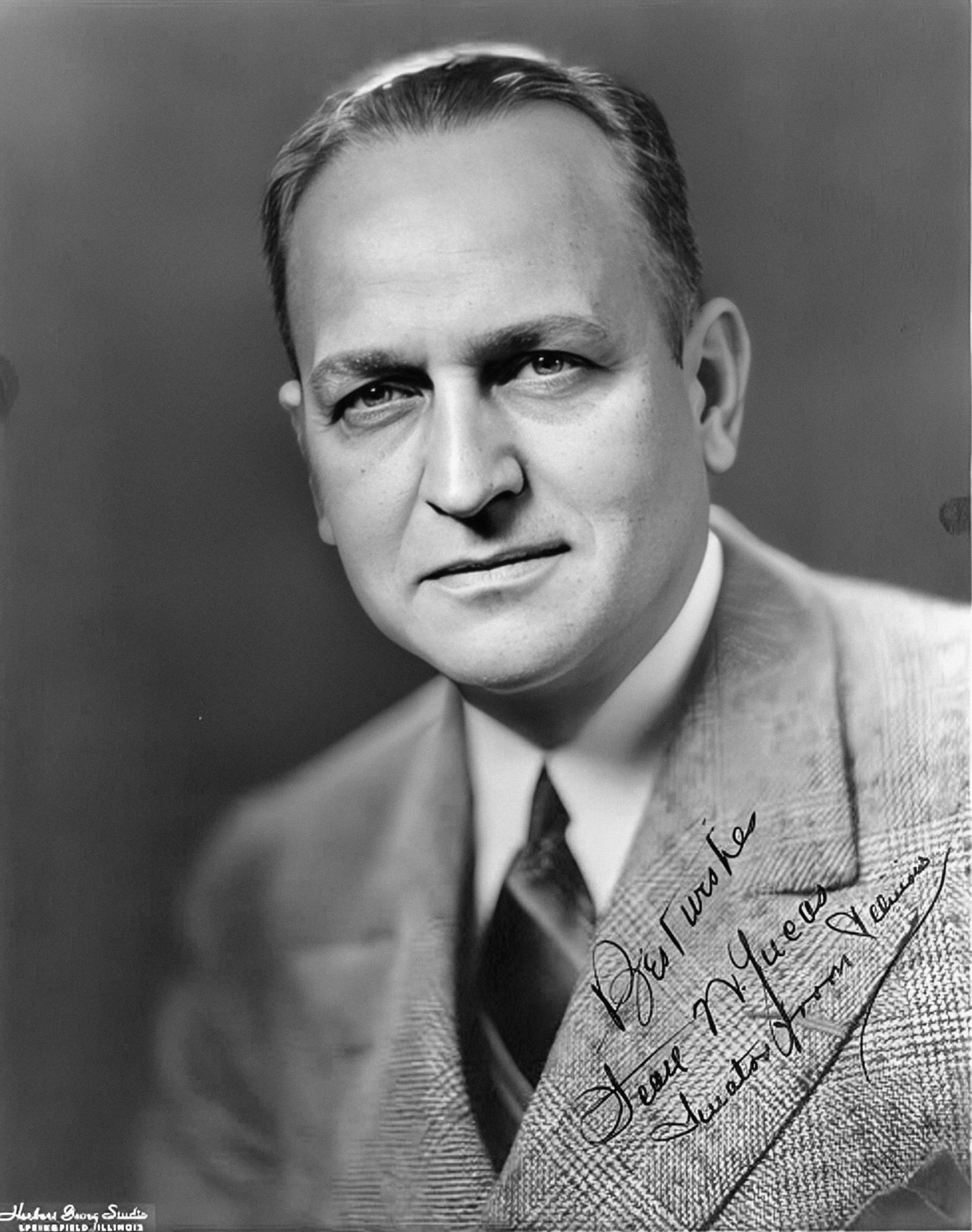
- Lucas, c. 1940s

United States Senator from Illinois
- In office January 3, 1939 – January 3, 1951
- Preceded by: William H. Dieterich
- Succeeded by: Everett Dirksen
Senate positions
Senate Majority Leader
In office January 3, 1949 – January 3, 1951
Deputy	Francis J. Myers
Preceded by	Wallace H. White
Succeeded by	Ernest McFarland
Chairman of the Senate Democratic Caucus
In office January 3, 1949 – January 3, 1951
Preceded by	Alben W. Barkley
Succeeded by	Ernest McFarland
Senate Minority Whip
In office January 3, 1947 – January 3, 1949
Leader	Alben W. Barkley
Preceded by	Kenneth S. Wherry
Succeeded by	Leverett Saltonstall

Member of the U.S. House of Representatives from Illinois's 20th district
- In office January 3, 1935 – January 3, 1939
- Preceded by: Henry Thomas Rainey
- Succeeded by: James M. Barnes

Personal details
- Born: Scott Wike Lucas; February 19, 1892 Chandlerville, Illinois, U.S.
- Died: February 22, 1968 (aged 76) Rocky Mount, North Carolina, U.S.
- Party: Democratic
- Spouse: Edith Biggs (m. 1923; died 1967)
- Relatives: Allen T. Lucas (nephew)
- Education: Illinois Wesleyan University (LLB)

Military service
- Allegiance: United States
- Branch/service: United States Army
- Battles/wars: World War I

Scott Wike Lucas (February 19, 1892 – February 22, 1968) was an American attorney and politician. A member of the Democratic Party, he represented Illinois in the U.S. House of Representatives (1935–1939) and the U.S. Senate (1939–1951). He was the Senate Majority Leader from 1949 to 1951.

== Early life ==
Lucas was born on a tenant farm near Chandlerville, in Cass County, Illinois. He was the youngest of six children of William Douglas and Sarah Catherine (née Underbrink) Lucas. His parents named him after Scott Wike, a Democrat who served as a representative from Illinois (1875–1877, 1889–1893). His nephew was Allen T. Lucas who practiced law with Lucas and who served in the Illinois General Assembly. After attending public schools, he began his studies at Illinois Wesleyan University. During college, he was active in athletics. He lettered in football, basketball, and baseball and played semiprofessional baseball in the Three-I League during his summer breaks.

Lucas graduated from Wesleyan with a law degree in 1914 and was admitted to the bar the following year. He served as a schoolteacher before entering private practice in Havana. During World War I, he served in the US Army and rose to become a lieutenant.

Lucas returned to his law practice following his military service and served as a state's attorney for Mason County from 1920 to 1925. He also worked as a commander of the Illinois Department of the American Legion. In 1932, he was defeated by William H. Dieterich for the Democratic nomination to challenge Republican incumbent Otis F. Glenn for a United States Senate seat from Illinois.

Lucas was later appointed chairman of State Tax Commission by Governor Henry Horner, serving from 1933 to 1935.

== House ==
In 1934, following the death of Speaker of the House Henry Thomas Rainey, Lucas was elected to the House of Representatives from Illinois's 20th congressional district. He established himself as a strong supporter of Franklin D. Roosevelt's New Deal, working to pass the Soil Conservation and Domestic Allotment Act of 1936 and the Agricultural Adjustment Act of 1938. However, Lucas disagreed with Roosevelt over the president's court-packing plan, which Lucas denounced as "useless, selfish, and futile."

== Senate ==
In 1938, after William Dieterich declined to run for re-election, Lucas was elected to the U.S. Senate over Republican Richard J. Lyons, with a 51%–48% victory. He was re-elected in 1944. Lucas was a favorite son candidate and among twelve nominated at the 1944 Democratic National Convention to serve as Franklin D. Roosevelt's running mate in the presidential election that year. With support from Harry S. Truman, he was elected party whip in 1946. Lucas, a moderate, drew support from both conservative and liberal wings of the party. He took over the Midwest campaign for Truman and was credited with assisting Truman's 1948 re-election and bringing nine Democrats into the Senate. When Alben Barkley became vice-president and resigned his seat, Lucas became majority leader. However, he was unable to build a consensus as Senate Majority Leader with the onset of the anticommunist era, and lost in 1950, to Republican Everett Dirksen. Lucas had become a target of Republican wrath with loss of political power in the Senate and the White House. His 1950 reelection campaign featured the active intervention into Illinois politics of Wisconsin Senator Joseph McCarthy, who traveled the state with Dirksen saying that Senator Lucas was "soft on communism." Dirksen would go on to decisively defeat Lucas with a 54% to 46% victory. Privately, in later years, Dirksen attributed his victory to Lucas's responsibilities as Senate Majority Leader, at the apparent expense of his state; Dirksen was free to campaign locally, often debating Lucas's Illinois Democratic Party proxies and calling attention to Lucas's prolonged absence from the state.

== Policy positions ==
Overall, as Congressman and Senator Lucas focused on civil rights, labor unions, foreign policy, and agriculture. He supported anti-lynching legislation, opposed the poll tax, and was a vocal advocate for desegregation. Lucas played a major role in the passage of the Fair Labor Standards Act of 1938. It established a federal minimum wage and maximum hours, and required overtime pay under specified conditions. He supported Franklin Roosevelt's main foreign policy initiatives, including Lend-Lease in 1941 for military aid to the Allies, and the creation of the United Nations. Lucas supported the New Deal farm programs, which were popular in rural Illinois, especially the Agricultural Adjustment Act of 1938. As Majority Leader of the Senate in 1949-1950 he supported Harry Truman's domestic and foreign agenda.

U.S. House of Representatives
Preceded by Henry T. Rainey	Member of the U.S. House of Representatives from Illinois's 20th congressional district 1935–1939	Succeeded by James Barnes
Party political offices
Preceded by William H. Dieterich	Democratic nominee for U.S. Senator from Illinois (Class 3); 1938, 1944, 1950	Succeeded by Richard Stengel
Preceded by J. Lister Hill; Alabama	Senate Democratic Whip; 1947–1949	Succeeded by Francis J. Myers; Pennsylvania
Preceded by Alben W. Barkley; Kentucky	Senate Democratic Leader; 1949–1951	Succeeded by Ernest McFarland; Arizona
U.S. Senate
Preceded by William H. Dieterich	United States Senator from Illinois (Class 3); 1939–1951; Served alongside: J. Hamilton Lewis, James M. Slattery, Charles W. Brooks, Paul Douglas	Succeeded by Everett Dirksen
Preceded by James F. Byrnes; South Carolina	Chair of the Senate Contingent Expenses Committee; 1941–1947	Position abolished
Preceded by Kenneth S. Wherry; Nebraska	Senate Minority Whip; 1947–1949	Succeeded by Leverett Saltonstall; Massachusetts
Preceded by Wallace H. White; Maine	Senate Majority Leader; 1949–1951	Succeeded by Ernest McFarland; Arizona
