= Illinois's at-large congressional district =

Former U.S. House district in Illinois

- Obsolete district
- Created: 1818; 1860; 1890; 1910
- Eliminated: 1830; 1870; 1895; 1949
- Years active: 1818–1833; 1863–1873; 1893–1895; 1913–1949

Illinois elected its United States Representative at-large on a general ticket upon achieving statehood December 3, 1818. Although the practice was first ended in 1830, it was revived several times, so that there would be at least one seat elected at large, in addition to elections in single-member districts. It last elected a US Representative at large in 1946. The district has been obsolete since.

== List of members representing the district ==
=== 1818–1833: one seat ===
From statehood to 1833, Illinois had only one congressional district, and therefore it was at-large.

Representative	Party	Years	Cong ress	Electoral history
John McLean (Shawneetown)	Democratic-Republican	December 3, 1818 – March 3, 1819	15th	Elected in 1818. Lost re-election.
Daniel P. Cook (Edwardsville)	Democratic-Republican (Note: Supported the Adams-Clay faction in the 1824 United States presidential election)	March 4, 1819 – March 3, 1825	16th 17th 18th 19th	Elected August 2, 1819. Re-elected August 7, 1820. Re-elected August 5, 1822. Re-elected August 2, 1824. Lost re-election.
Daniel P. Cook (Edwardsville)	Anti-Jacksonian	March 4, 1825 – March 3, 1827	16th 17th 18th 19th	Elected August 2, 1819. Re-elected August 7, 1820. Re-elected August 5, 1822. Re-elected August 2, 1824. Lost re-election.
Joseph Duncan (Jacksonville)	Jacksonian	March 4, 1827 – March 3, 1833	20th 21st 22nd	Elected August 7, 1826. Re-elected August 4, 1828. Re-elected August 1, 1831. Moved to 3rd district.
District inactive March 3, 1833

=== 1863–1873: one seat ===
From 1863 to 1873 there was one at-large seat in addition to the districted seats.

Representative	Party	Years	Cong ress	Electoral history
James C. Allen (Palestine)	Democratic	March 4, 1863 – March 3, 1865	38th	Elected in 1862. Lost re-election.
Samuel W. Moulton (Shelbyville)	Republican	March 4, 1865 – March 3, 1867	39th	Elected in 1864. Retired.
John A. Logan (Carbondale)	Republican	March 4, 1867 – March 3, 1871	40th 41st	Elected in 1866. Re-elected in 1868. Re-elected in 1870, but resigned to become U.S. Senator.
Vacant		March 4, 1871 – November 7, 1871	42nd	
John L. Beveridge (Evanston)	Republican	November 7, 1871 – January 4, 1873	42nd	Elected to finish Logan's term. Resigned to become Lieutenant Governor.
Vacant		January 4, 1873 – March 3, 1873	42nd	

=== 1893–1895: two seats ===
From 1893 to 1895, there were two at-large seats in addition to the districted seats.

Years	Cong ress	Seat A			Seat B		
Years	Cong ress	Representative	Party	Electoral history	Representative	Party	Electoral history
March 4, 1893 – January 12, 1895	53rd	John C. Black (Chicago)	Democratic	Elected in 1892. Resigned to become U.S. Attorney.	Andrew J. Hunter (Paris)	Democratic	Elected in 1892. Lost re-election in the 19th district.
January 12, 1895 – March 3, 1895	53rd	Vacant			Andrew J. Hunter (Paris)	Democratic	Elected in 1892. Lost re-election in the 19th district.

=== 1913–1949: two seats, then one ===
Two at-large seats were re-established March 4, 1913. From that date to January 3, 1943, there were two at-large seats, which was reduced to one seat from 1943 to 1949. Representation by districts also continued during this period. The at-large seat was abolished effective January 3, 1949.

Years	Cong ress	Seat A			Seat B		
Years	Cong ress	Representative	Party	Electoral history	Representative	Party	Electoral history
March 4, 1913 – March 3, 1915	63rd	Lawrence B. Stringer (Lincoln)	Democratic	Elected in 1912. Retired to run for U.S. Senator.	William E. Williams (Pittsfield)	Democratic	Elected in 1912. Re-elected in 1914. Lost re-election.
March 4, 1915 – March 3, 1917	64th	Burnett M. Chiperfield (Canton)	Republican	Elected in 1914. Retired to run for U.S. Senator.	William E. Williams (Pittsfield)	Democratic	Elected in 1912. Re-elected in 1914. Lost re-election.
March 4, 1917 – March 3, 1919	65th	William E. Mason (Chicago)	Republican	Elected in 1916. Re-elected in 1918. Re-elected in 1920. Died.	Medill McCormick (Chicago)	Republican	Elected in 1916. Retired to run for U.S. Senator.
March 4, 1919 – March 3, 1921	66th	William E. Mason (Chicago)	Republican	Elected in 1916. Re-elected in 1918. Re-elected in 1920. Died.	Richard Yates Jr. (Springfield)	Republican	Elected in 1918. Re-elected in 1920. Re-elected in 1922. Re-elected in 1924. Re-elected in 1926. Re-elected in 1928. Re-elected in 1930. Lost re-election.
March 3, 1921 – June 16, 1921	67th	William E. Mason (Chicago)	Republican	Elected in 1916. Re-elected in 1918. Re-elected in 1920. Died.	Richard Yates Jr. (Springfield)	Republican	Elected in 1918. Re-elected in 1920. Re-elected in 1922. Re-elected in 1924. Re-elected in 1926. Re-elected in 1928. Re-elected in 1930. Lost re-election.
June 16, 1921 – November 7, 1922	67th	Vacant			Richard Yates Jr. (Springfield)	Republican	Elected in 1918. Re-elected in 1920. Re-elected in 1922. Re-elected in 1924. Re-elected in 1926. Re-elected in 1928. Re-elected in 1930. Lost re-election.
November 7, 1922 – March 3, 1923	67th	Winnifred Huck (Chicago)	Republican	Elected to finish her father's term. Retired.	Richard Yates Jr. (Springfield)	Republican	Elected in 1918. Re-elected in 1920. Re-elected in 1922. Re-elected in 1924. Re-elected in 1926. Re-elected in 1928. Re-elected in 1930. Lost re-election.
March 4, 1923 – March 3, 1925	68th	Henry R. Rathbone (Kenilworth)	Republican	Elected in 1922. Re-elected in 1924. Re-elected in 1926. Died.	Richard Yates Jr. (Springfield)	Republican	Elected in 1918. Re-elected in 1920. Re-elected in 1922. Re-elected in 1924. Re-elected in 1926. Re-elected in 1928. Re-elected in 1930. Lost re-election.
March 4, 1925 – March 3, 1927	69th	Henry R. Rathbone (Kenilworth)	Republican	Elected in 1922. Re-elected in 1924. Re-elected in 1926. Died.	Richard Yates Jr. (Springfield)	Republican	Elected in 1918. Re-elected in 1920. Re-elected in 1922. Re-elected in 1924. Re-elected in 1926. Re-elected in 1928. Re-elected in 1930. Lost re-election.
March 4, 1927 – July 15, 1928	70th	Henry R. Rathbone (Kenilworth)	Republican	Elected in 1922. Re-elected in 1924. Re-elected in 1926. Died.	Richard Yates Jr. (Springfield)	Republican	Elected in 1918. Re-elected in 1920. Re-elected in 1922. Re-elected in 1924. Re-elected in 1926. Re-elected in 1928. Re-elected in 1930. Lost re-election.
July 15, 1928 – March 3, 1929	70th	Vacant			Richard Yates Jr. (Springfield)	Republican	Elected in 1918. Re-elected in 1920. Re-elected in 1922. Re-elected in 1924. Re-elected in 1926. Re-elected in 1928. Re-elected in 1930. Lost re-election.
March 4, 1929 – March 3, 1931	71st	Ruth H. McCormick (Byron)	Republican	Elected in 1928. Retired to run for U.S. Senator.	Richard Yates Jr. (Springfield)	Republican	Elected in 1918. Re-elected in 1920. Re-elected in 1922. Re-elected in 1924. Re-elected in 1926. Re-elected in 1928. Re-elected in 1930. Lost re-election.
March 4, 1931 – March 3, 1933	72nd	William H. Dieterich (Beardstown)	Democratic	Elected in 1930. Retired to run for U.S. Senator.	Richard Yates Jr. (Springfield)	Republican	Elected in 1918. Re-elected in 1920. Re-elected in 1922. Re-elected in 1924. Re-elected in 1926. Re-elected in 1928. Re-elected in 1930. Lost re-election.
March 4, 1933 – January 3, 1935	73rd	Martin A. Brennan (Bloomington)	Democratic	Elected in 1932. Re-elected in 1934. Retired.	Walter Nesbit (Belleville)	Democratic	Elected in 1932. Lost renomination.
January 3, 1935 – June 2, 1935	74th	Martin A. Brennan (Bloomington)	Democratic	Elected in 1932. Re-elected in 1934. Retired.	Michael L. Igoe (Chicago)	Democratic	Elected in 1934. Resigned to become U.S. Attorney.
June 2, 1935 – January 3, 1937	74th	Martin A. Brennan (Bloomington)	Democratic	Elected in 1932. Re-elected in 1934. Retired.	Vacant		
January 3, 1937 – January 3, 1939	75th	Edwin V. Champion (Peoria)	Democratic	Elected in 1936. Retired.	Lewis M. Long (Sandwich)	Democratic	Elected in 1936. Lost renomination.
January 3, 1939 – January 3, 1941	76th	John C. Martin (Salem)	Democratic	Elected in 1938. Retired.	Thomas V. Smith (Chicago)	Democratic	Elected in 1938. Lost re-election.
January 3, 1941 – January 3, 1943	77th	Stephen A. Day (Evanston)	Republican	Elected in 1940. Re-elected in 1942. Lost re-election.	William Stratton (Morris)	Republican	Elected in 1940. Retired.
January 3, 1943 – January 3, 1945	78th	Stephen A. Day (Evanston)	Republican	Elected in 1940. Re-elected in 1942. Lost re-election.			
January 3, 1945 – January 3, 1947	79th	Emily T. Douglas (Chicago)	Democratic	Elected in 1944. Lost re-election.			
January 3, 1947 – January 3, 1949	80th	William Stratton (Morris)	Republican	Elected again in 1946. Retired.			

== See also ==
- Illinois Territory's at-large congressional district
