= 1935 Chicago mayoral election =

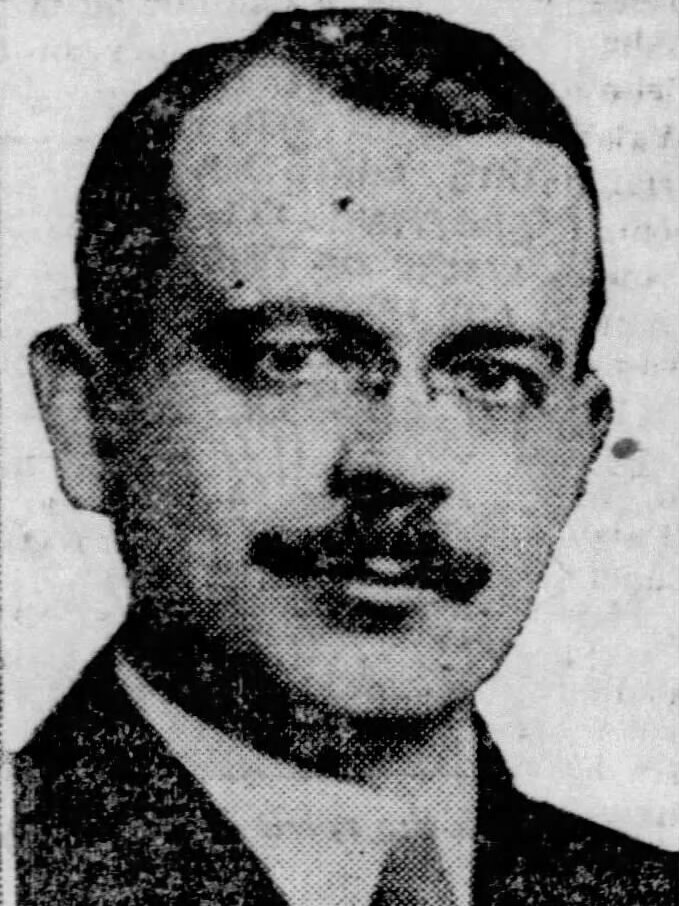

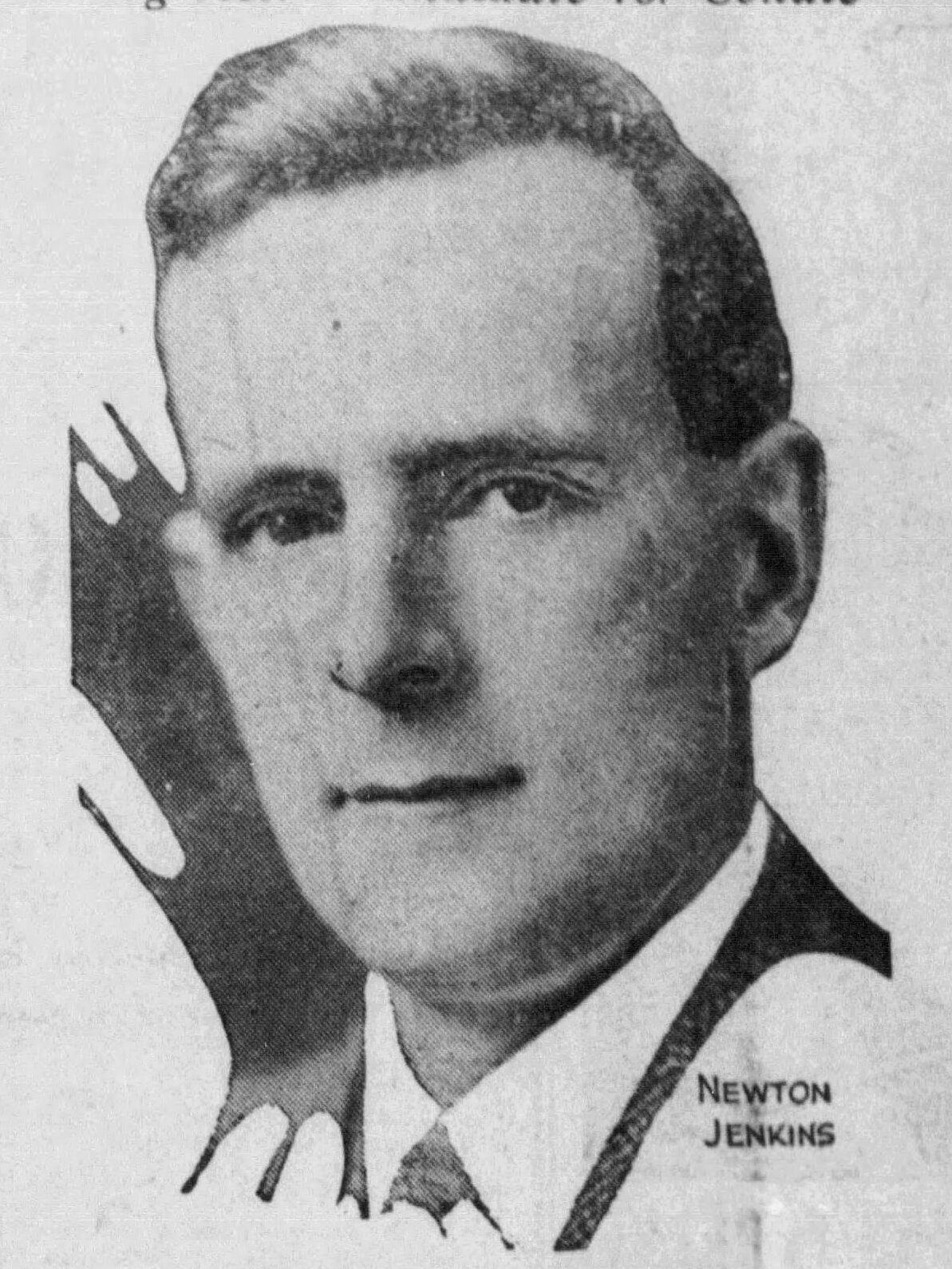
Nominee	Edward J. Kelly	Emil C. Wetten	Newton Jenkins
Party	Democratic	Republican	Independent
Popular vote	798,150	166,571	87,726
Percentage	75.84%	15.83%	8.34%
Mayor before election
Edward J. Kelly
Democratic
Elected mayor
Edward J. Kelly
Democratic

In the Chicago mayoral election of 1935, incumbent Interim Mayor Edward J. Kelly (who had been appointed to office of mayor after the assassination of Anton Cermak) defeated Republican Emil C. Wetten and independent candidate Newton Jenkins by a landslide 60% margin of victory. Kelly outperformed the runner-up, Wetten, by a proportion of 5:1. The 631,579 votes which separated Kelly and Wetten broke the record for the largest vote majority that any United States mayoralty had been won by (measured by the raw number of votes separating the winner and runner-up).

Both major parties held primary elections to select their nominees. In the Democratic Party primary, Interim Mayor Kelly won a massive majority over three opponents, winning 88.92% of the overall vote. In the Republican primary, Wetten won a sizable majority against two opponents. Businessman Mortimer B. Flynn was the strongest of his opponents. The second opponent, Grace Gray, was the first woman to ever file as a candidate for mayor of Chicago.

== Background ==
Edward J. Kelly (a Democrat was appointed interim mayor in the aftermath of the 1933 assassination of Mayor Anton Cermak (also a Democrat). Cermak had been shot during an appearance alongside Franklin D. Roosevelt (at the time the president-elect of the United States). The assassin, Giuseppe Zangara, likely had intended to shoot Roosevelt, not Cermak. The Chicago City Council had appointed Kelly as interim mayor after the resignation Frank J. Corr, who had initially served as acting mayor after Kelly's assassination.

Entering the 1935 city elections, the city's Democratic machine was at full-strength, with strong patronage and strong electoral performance. It was headed by the Kelly (the Chairman of the Cook County Democratic Party and the Illinois member of the Democratic National Committee). Democratic success was widely seen as a continuation of organizational success of the county Democratic party that had been first built during the landslide Democratic performance of the 1932 elections, on the coattails of Franklin D. Roosevelt's success on the presidential ballot.

While the city's Republican Party had in the 1920s controlled the city's politics during the peak of then-mayor William Hale Thompson's political machine, its power had since fallen greatly. The city party had been attempting to distance itself from the specter of the disgraced former mayor who had been unseated by Cermak in the city's previous mayoral election.

== Nominations ==
The Democratic and Republican primaries were held in February, coinciding with the first round of the Chicago City Council elections.

=== Democratic primary ===
Interim mayor Edward J. Kelly ran for election to a full first term.

==== Democratic primary results ====
Despite a blizzard, a substantial number of Chicago voters participated in the Democratic mayoral primary. Edward J. Kelly won what was the greatest plurality ever in a Chicago mayoral primary.

Chicago Democratic mayoral primary (February 25, 1935)
Party	Candidate	Votes	%
Democratic	Edward J. Kelly (incumbent)	479,825	88.92
Democratic	Martin Powroznik	39,153	7.26
Democratic	James Fred Robertson	15,541	2.88
Democratic	John P. O'Meara	5,077	0.94
Turnout		539,596	100.00

=== Republican primary ===
The Republican primary was won by Emil C. Wetten. Wetten was an attorney that had served in such roles as first assistant corporation counsel for the city. His strongest opponent was Mortimer B. Flynn, who had been president of the Pottinger-Flynn Coal Company. The third candidate in the race, Grace A. Gray, was the first woman ever to file as a candidate for mayor of Chicago.

Wetten did not receive the formal support of the local Republican Party organization in his primary, and in previous bids for elected office had also run independent of support from any party establishment. When he filed his candidacy, The New York Times wrote,

He is a lawyer of good reputation whose chief political asset probably is a claim upon the German vote. It is, in the opinion of some, a matter of credit that he has never held a position of favor in the eyes of the Republican party management.

Some in the party hoped that Thompson might run again, viewing him as the party's only hope of returning to power in Chicago in 1935. However, Thompson did not run. The New York Times reported that Thompson had recognized that he lacked the needed support he would have needed from the party establishment; and that with the Democratic Party in full control of local political patronage, avenues Thompson he had used in his previous campaigns to secure campaign funds would not be available to him in 1935.

The Republican primary illustrated a collapse in Chicagoans' support for the party. In the previous election, more than five times as many voters had participated in the Republican primary. Kelly received more than five times as many votes in his 1935 primary as the cumulative vote total of all three candidates in the Republican primary. One news report wrote of Wetten's win in the primary,

Wetten, who won the apathetic fight to carry the Republican mayoral standard, is symbolic in a way of the status of his party. He won the primary battle from a sick bed and has conducted most of his election campaign from a desk in his home. He has no campaign manager and few friends among the old guard.

==== Republican primary results ====
Chicago Republican mayoral primary (February 25, 1935)
Party	Candidate	Votes	%
Republican	Emil C. Wetten	69,600	59.73
Republican	Mortimer B. Flynn	37,061	31.80
Republican	Grace Gray	9,868	8.47
Turnout		116,529	100.00

=== Independent candidacy of Newton Jenkins ===
Newton Jenkins, an attorney, ran as an independent candidate. Jenkins promoted himself as a "progressive" candidate.

Jenkins had run for office before. He first ran for alderman of the 27th Ward in 1920. He ran in the Republican primary of the 1924 United States Senate election in Illinois on a Robert La Follette-aligned platform. During the 1930 Illinois U.S. Senate race he had been one of several candidates challenging incumbent Charles S. Deneen for the Republican Party nomination. Ultimately, Ruth Hanna McCormick had received the Republican nomination. He again ran unsuccessfully in the Republican primary of the 1932 United States Senate election in Illinois.

Jenkins' run was supported by the Third Party, an effort to create a new party. The party claimed itself to be spun-off from the progressive Republican movement. The party, which intended to use "U.S., Unite" as its national slogan and utilize the buffalo as its mascot, sought to use Jenkins' candidacy as a national launchpad for the party. This effort ultimately merged into the short-lived Union Party, on which party line Jenkins would go on to run unsuccessfully for U.S. Senate in 1936.

Jenkins was very openly antisemitic. During his campaign, Jenkins published a number of antisemitic pieces. The platform of the Third Party-backed slate of independent candidates in the 1935 Chicago municipal elections was to create a city manager position in the city, to adopt the city commission-style of government in Chicago, to create jobs for the head of family of 100,000 households, to eliminate taxes in the city, and to end "corrupt elections". The Third Party was regarded to be "openly fascist". The July 10, 1935 edition of the American Guardian newspaper wrote that Jenkins had,

Established contact with the Chicago Nazi organization, has appeared on platforms with uniformed Nazis at their official meetings, is openly anti-Semitic and has announced as part of his policy the formation of highly militarized storm troops to defend and protect the interests of his party. The Jenkins [Third Party] is also anti-labor, Jenkins having pescribed the lamp post hanging as the cure for all labor "agitators".

== Third parties that failed to qualify for ballot inclusion ==
Three further third-parties attempted to run tickets in the 1935 municipal elections, but failed to collect the necessary 56,000 signatures for its petitions to qualify for the ballot.

=== Socialist Party of America ===
The Socialist Party of America abandoned its effort to run a slate of candidates in 1935 after failing to collect enough signatures.

=== Douglas-led "Chicago Fusion" ticket ===
University of Chicago professor Paul H. Douglas sought to run for mayor atop a "Chicago Fusion ticket" for which he circulated petitions. By 1935, Douglas held strong local notoriety, as well as some level of national note. Some derided his planned ticket as the "Con-fusion ticket", arguing it would further dilute opposition votes to the advantage of Kelly's chances for re-election. Additionally, some critics of Douglas's politics characterized him as being a radical "campus pink". Douglas's ticket's slogan was to be "militant honesty". For city treasurer, the ticket was to nominate Laurence D. Staplin (the president of the Carbonite Metal Company). For city clerk, the ticket was to nominate Sigfrid L Blomgren (who was also running in the Republican primary for the same office).

Douglas's proposed ticket received support from Chandler Owen, former alderman Wiley Mills, and unsuccessful 1934 Municipal Court candidate David H. Chaplow.

=== McCutcheon-led ticket ===
Dale D. McCutcheon, a political novice and advertising industry businessman, also sought to run for mayor atop his own third-party slate. McCutcheon's ticket would have nominated income tax expert A. L. Van Winkle for city treasurer and attorney Louis A. Pinderski for city clerk.

== General election ==
Wetten framed his campaign against Kelly as a campaign against machine politics. Wetten was a rather weak opponent.

After the result, the United Press wrote,

Wetten, a lawyer unknown to the voters and ill during most of his campaign, did not receive united organization and made a dispirited campaign.

Both Wetten and Jenkins lacked sizable campaign organizations for their candidacies. The New York Times noted that on election day, its reporters did not see poll watchers from either of Kelly's opponents at voting precinct, while the city's cash-flushed Democratic organization was able to locate between "eight to a dozen workers in every precinct".

=== Results ===
Mayor of Chicago 1935 election (General Election)
Party	Candidate	Votes	%
Democratic	Edward J. Kelly (incumbent)	798,150	75.84
Republican	Emil C. Wetten	166,571	15.83
Independent	Newton Jenkins	87,726	8.34
Turnout		1,052,447	100

Kelly carried of the city's fifty wards. Wetten received less than one-fifth of Kelly's vote total. Kelly led Wetten by a margin of 60.01 points. The massive 631,579 majority that separated Kelly and Wetten was a record at the time for the mayoralty of an American city. This beat the previous record of 497,165 that had been set by Jimmy Walker in the 1929 New York City mayoral election. The majority was far greater than the 194,257 majority which Cermak, as Democratic nominee in 1931, had defeated William Hale Thompson.

Kelly is estimated to have received 84.84% of the Polish-American vote, while Wetten is estimated to have received 8.08%.

In addition to Kelly's victory, other coinciding elections in the city also saw strong Democratic performances, with the United Press the party's performance in the city's elections to be "one of the most decisive election victories in the history of American cities." The New York Times described Kelly and Chicago Democrats as having "ridden to victory," on an "avalanche".

In 1935, Democratic Party-backed candidates performed well in the coinciding Chicago City Council elections. In the first round of the council elections (coinciding with the mayoral primaries) Democrats won 40 of the 50 council seats.

The Democratic nominees for city clerk (Peter J. Brady) and city treasurer (Gustave A. Brand) also won election, with Brand ousting a Republican incumbent (Charles W. Swanson).

The election was only the fourth time (Note: excluding the disputed and invalidated April 1876 vote) that a candidate won more than 70% of the vote in a Chicago mayoral election. The previous instances had been in 1849, 1853, and 1871. Subsequently, Democratic nominees received more than 70% of the vote in seven partisan general elections (1959, 1967, 1971, 1975, 1977, 1979, and 1991); the first rounds of three nonpartisan elections (1999, 2003, and 2007); and the runoffs of one nonpartisan election (2019), with the winners of four of these receiving vote shares in excess of the 75.84% Kelly won in 1935 (1975, 1977, 1959, and 2003).

Wetten's 15.83% vote share (at the time) marked the lowest for any Republican nominee for mayor of Chicago, usurping the previous low of 20.08% in the four-way race of the 1897 election. No nominee of the party would receive a lower vote share until 1987.

== Aftermath ==
Democrats celebrated their overwhelming success in the city's elections with impromptu parades and gatherings across the city.

Kelly would go on to win re-election twice. In 1947, he would forgo seeking a fourth term after being urged to step aside by the Cook County Democratic Party, which had been concerned about the prospect of Kelly losing a general election due to scandals which had plagued him during his fourteen years as mayor.

This was the first Chicago mayoral election won by a candidate hailing from the Bridgeport neighborhood of Chicago. Over the subsequent decades, Bridgeport would come to generate several additional mayors, with Martin Kennelly, Richard J. Daley, Michael A. Bilandic, and Richard M. Daley all hailing from the neighborhood.

After his massive defeat, Wetten remarked, "the Republican party is completely disintegrated –there is no local Republican party." However, local Republican Party leaders voiced disagreement with notions that the result marked the party's death in the city.

The New York Times predicted,

Unquestionably the Kelly victory will immensely strengthen the Chicago party organization in its dealings with Washington, in its influence over State politics and in its position as a factor in the 1936 national campaign. Cook County casts more than half the vote of Illinois. Democratic control of Illinois seems assured for at least four years more. But Governor Horner, if he desires renomination, will have to go along with Mayor Kelly. He can get it only by grace of Chicago.

The New York Times also observed that the disastrous Republican result was likely to exacerbate infighting in the Chicago Republican Party between elements seeking to excise the specter of disgraced former mayor Thompson from the city party, and loyal Thompson associates seeking to re-enter the fold of the party's politics, writing,

The desperate plight of Chicago Republicanism has stimulated activity on the part of two politicians who date from the "Big Bill" Thompson régime. They have been watchers on the side lines, while other strategists attempted to reorganize the party of which "Big Bill" was once the local idol. Now, they say, the failure of those strategists is demonstrated, and each is offering himself as agent of recovery.

Within days of the result, Robert E. Crowe (former Cook County state's attorney and Thompson ally) announced that he planned to establish a Cook County Republican Club. The New York Times reported that this announcement was not taken serious by most in Chicagos political community. Frederick Lundin, once a Thompson ally turned adversary of Thompson during his late mayoralty, began talking about ideas of how to rehabilitate the party's image amongst Chicagoans. Thompson himself would unsuccessfully seek to make a mayoral comeback four years later, losing the 1939 Republican primary to Dwight H. Green. No Republican nominee would again be elected mayor. Chicago ceased holding partisan mayoral elections after 1995.

Chicago mayoral elections would not see a comparably broad share of votes separating the winner and runner-up until forty years later in 1975 when Richard J. Daley won with a 57.73-point margin between him and runner-up John J. Hoellen Jr. While the 60.01-point percentage lead of 1935 has since been surpassed in Chicago mayoral elections by the 66-point margin of 1979 and the 64.44-point margin of 2003 the raw vote pluralities in those elections (563,210 in 1979 and 232,641 in 2003) were less than the 631,579 of the 1935 result.

After 1935, the subsequent four mayoral elections (1939, 1943, 1947, 1951) saw Republican nominees run far more organized campaigns in far more competitive races. Democratic nominees won those elections by margins of between 10 and 18 points. The next six elections after that saw Democrat Richard J. Daley defeat Republican nominees with margins as close as 10 points (in 1955) and 12 points (in 1963), and as broad as lopsided as 40 points (1971) 42 points (1959), 48 points (1967) and 58 (in the aforementioned 1975 election).
