= James Metcalfe =

James Metcalfe may refer to:

- James Metcalfe (Bedford MP) (fl. 1715–1730), British politician
- James Metcalfe (York East MP) (1822–1886), Canadian businessman and MP for York East
- James Henry Metcalfe (1848–1925), Canadian businessman and MP for Kingston
- James B. Metcalfe (1846–1924), American lawyer and political figure
- James Metcalfe (rugby) (1873–1943), English rugby union and rugby league footballer
- James J. Metcalfe (1906–1960), American poet
- James Metcalfe (Bengal Army officer) (1817–1888), Anglo-Indian military officer in the Bengal Army
- James Stetson Metcalfe (1858–1927), American drama critic

== See also ==
- James Medcalf (1895–1980), English footballer
- James Metcalf (disambiguation), including Jim Metcalf
