= MHMR =

MHMR may refer to:

- Texas Department of State Health Services, a parent organization of the former Texas Department of Mental Health and Mental Retardation
- Virginia Department of Mental Health, Mental Retardation, and Substance Abuse
