= Lois Van Valkenburgh =

American activist (1920–2002)

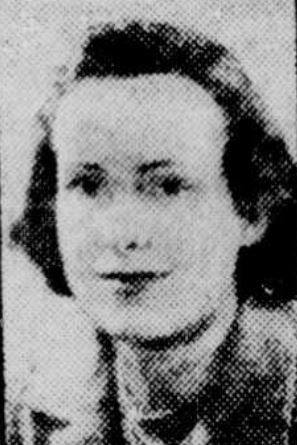
- Warfield during her 1939 run for junior class president at the University of Wisconsin
- Born: Lois Hooper Warfield; 1920; Milwaukee, Wisconsin
- Died: 2002 (aged 81–82); Arlington, Virginia
- Occupations: lobbyist, political activist, legislative aide
- Years active: 1939–1998
- Children: 3; including Blaire
- Relatives: Jessie Jack Hooper (grandmother)

Lois Van Valkenburgh (1920–2002) was an American lobbyist and legislative aide most known for her political and civil rights activism. She produced Virginia's first voter's guide in the 1940s and worked in the women's poll tax repeal movement. She also pressed for school desegregation in the Washington, D.C. metropolitan area. Active in many civic organizations, she founded and chaired the Alexandria Community Services Board for many years. She also served on the board of the Virginia Department of Behavioral Health and Developmental Services and in the 1970s was a legislative aide to Delegate Mary Marshall.

== Early life and education ==
Lois Hooper Warfield was born in 1920 in Milwaukee, Wisconsin to Lorna (née Hooper) and Louis Marshall Warfield. Her father was a prominent physician and president of the Wisconsin Anti-Tuberculosis Association. Her mother was a clubwoman and voice teacher. Her maternal grandmother was Jessie Jack Hooper, a suffragette, clubwoman, and peace activist, who was one of the first women to run for elected office in Wisconsin. Warfield grew up in Milwaukee and attended the University of Wisconsin–Madison. In 1939, she ran for junior class president, causing a flurry of press articles about her wanting to become the prom king, because by tradition winner of the election served in that capacity. Though she did not win the election, she was only the second woman to attempt a class presidency at the university and the first to run for junior class president. She completed her education in 1941.

== Career ==
After graduation, Warfield spent the war years (1941–1947) employed by the Office of War Information in Washington, D.C. and San Francisco. While in San Francisco, she met Willard Van Valkenburgh, who was a lieutenant in the U.S. Navy. They married in the fall of 1947 and moved to Washington, D.C. the following year. Van Valkenburgh became involved with the League of Women Voters and helped produce Alexandria's first voter guide in the 1940s. She was active in the women's poll tax repeal movement, directing the League's anti-poll tax committee in the 1950s.

Van Valkenburgh was active in educational initiatives, and worked to integrate local schools. She served as president of the T. C. Williams High School Parent-Teacher Association twice in the 1960s and was on the board of the Virginia Congress of Parents and Teachers. She volunteered for organizations providing assistance to people with developmental disabilities and addiction problems. She was on the board of the Virginia Department of Behavioral Health and Developmental Services for eight years and chaired the Alexandria Community Services Board, which she co-founded, for ten years.

Van Valkenburgh worked as a lobbyist on Capitol Hill for the Citizens Committee for UNICEF in the 1960s. In the 1970s, Van Valkenburgh served as a legislative aide to Delegate Mary Marshall at her office in Richmond. Throughout her career, she received many honors and awards, including recognition in 1990, from the Virginia Association of Community Service Boards for her volunteer work; from the National Council of Community Mental Health Centers and from the Alexandria Commission on Women. In 1998, she was recognized by the Alexandria Volunteer Bureau for her contributions in fighting breast cancer and promoting senior services for aging community members.

== Death and legacy ==
Van Valkenburgh died from heart failure on December 24, 2002, at her home in Alexandria. She was formally honored in 2003 by the Virginia House of Delegates for her community service.
