= 1936 United States presidential election in Georgia =

- November 3, 1936

Nominee	Franklin Roosevelt	Alf Landon
Party	Democratic	Republican
Home state	New York	Kansas
Running mate	John N. Garner	Frank Knox
Electoral vote	12	0
Popular vote	255,364	36,942
Percentage	87.10%	12.60%
County results
Roosevelt
50–60%
60–70%
70–80%
80–90%
90–100%
Landon
50–60%
President before election
Franklin Roosevelt
Democratic
Elected President
Franklin Roosevelt
Democratic

The 1936 United States presidential election in Georgia took place on November 3, 1936, as part of the wider United States presidential election. Voters chose 12 representatives, or electors, to the Electoral College, who voted for president and vice president.

With the exception of a handful of historically Unionist North Georgia counties – chiefly Fannin but also to a lesser extent Pickens, Gilmer and Towns – Georgia since the 1880s had been a one-party state dominated by the Democratic Party. Disfranchisement of almost all African-Americans and most poor whites had made the Republican Party virtually nonexistent outside of local governments in those few hill counties, and the national Democratic Party served as the guardian of white supremacy against a Republican Party historically associated with memories of Reconstruction. The only competitive elections were Democratic primaries, which state laws restricted to whites on the grounds of the Democratic Party being legally a private club.

On election day, the Democratic ticket of incumbent President Franklin D. Roosevelt and Vice President John N. Garner carried the state of Georgia in a landslide, defeating Republican Alf Landon by a margin of nearly 75 percentage points and sweeping all but one county in the state. Even amidst a national Democratic landslide, Roosevelt's margin in Georgia exceeded his margin nationwide by more than 50 percentage points.

== Results ==
1936 United States presidential election in Georgia
Party	Candidate	Votes	Percentage	Electoral votes
Democratic	Franklin Roosevelt (incumbent)	255,364	87.10%	12
Republican	Alf Landon	36,942	12.60%	0
Prohibition	D. Leigh Colvin	663	0.23%	0
Union	William Lemke	141	0.05%	0
Socialist	Norman Thomas	68	0.02%	0

=== Results by congressional districts ===
State at-large
Candidate	Party	Votes	%
N. A. Morris	Democratic Party	255,364	43.55
A. S. Bradley	Democratic Party	255,355	43.55
Harry Sommers	Republican Party	36,942	6.30
H. J. Carswell	Republican Party	36,926	6.30
W. D. Upshaw	Prohibition Party	660	0.11
Charles E. Hawkins	Prohibition Party	656	0.11
L. R. Tillman	Union Party	141	0.02
W. J. Fiveash	Union Party	141	0.02
L. Kramer	Socialist Party of America	68	0.01
A. Jacobs	Socialist Party of America	68	0.01
Total		586,321	100.00

1st congressional district
Candidate	Party	Votes	%
Joe Tillman	Democratic Party	255,249	87.11
C. M. Jordan	Republican Party	36,907	12.60
C. M. Ledbetter	Prohibition Party	658	0.22
James M. Elders	Union Party	141	0.05
L. Izzard	Socialist Party of America	68	0.02
Total		293,023	100.00

2nd congressional district
Candidate	Party	Votes	%
H. H. Wind	Democratic Party	255,245	87.11
C. W. Pidcock	Republican Party	36,906	12.59
W. O. Covington	Prohibition Party	663	0.23
H. A. Schockley	Union Party	141	0.05
W. J. Lewis	Socialist Party of America	68	0.02
Total		293,023	100.00

3rd congressional district
Candidate	Party	Votes	%
Israel Mannheim	Democratic Party	255,246	87.11
C. M. Young	Republican Party	36,906	12.59
Joe Lawrence	Prohibition Party	663	0.23
Paul L. Singleton	Union Party	141	0.05
A. R. Russ	Socialist Party of America	68	0.02
Total		293,024	100.00

4th congressional district
Candidate	Party	Votes	%
Arthur Maddox	Democratic Party	255,247	87.11
Wilson Williams	Republican Party	36,906	12.59
E. P. Hammond	Prohibition Party	663	0.23
B. C. Branan	Union Party	141	0.05
S. Karp	Socialist Party of America	68	0.02
Total		293,025	100.00

5th congressional district
Candidate	Party	Votes	%
Scott Candler	Democratic Party	255,256	87.11
E. K. Large	Republican Party	36,906	12.59
E.G. Jolly	Prohibition Party	663	0.23
Mrs. M. J. Jeffreys	Union Party	141	0.05
M. J. Martin	Socialist Party of America	68	0.02
Total		293,034	100.00

6th congressional district
Candidate	Party	Votes	%
George Scheer	Democratic Party	255,160	87.10
Herbert Block	Republican Party	36,906	12.60
Paul O. Elder	Prohibition Party	663	0.23
J. T. Weaver	Union Party	141	0.05
J. Haskin	Socialist Party of America	68	0.02
Total		292,938	100.00

7th congressional district
Candidate	Party	Votes	%
John K. Davis	Democratic Party	255,156	87.10
F. D. Noble	Republican Party	36,906	12.60
C. P. East	Prohibition Party	663	0.23
J. H. Thomas	Union Party	141	0.05
H. Harris	Socialist Party of America	68	0.02
Total		292,934	100.00

8th congressional district
Candidate	Party	Votes	%
Emory Bass	Democratic Party	255,156	87.10
J. E. Vallotten	Republican Party	36,906	12.60
W. L. Miller	Prohibition Party	663	0.23
J. M. Tillman	Union Party	141	0.05
D. Bass	Socialist Party of America	68	0.02
Total		292,934	100.00

9th congressional district
Candidate	Party	Votes	%
Albert Hardy	Democratic Party	255,158	87.11
W. Y. Gillam	Republican Party	36,900	12.60
R. L. Wood	Prohibition Party	662	0.23
H. A. Duvall	Union Party	141	0.05
A. Andreae	Socialist Party of America	68	0.02
Total		292,929	100.00

10th congressional district
Candidate	Party	Votes	%
Ernest Camp	Democratic Party	255,261	87.11
Mrs. L. B. Lambert	Republican Party	36,898	12.59
W. M. Sigafoes	Prohibition Party	662	0.23
J. M. Sammons	Union Party	141	0.05
L. Ruskin	Socialist Party of America	68	0.02
Total		293,030	100.00

=== Results by county ===
County	Franklin Delano Roosevelt Democratic		Alfred Mossman Landon Republican		David Leigh Colvin Prohibition		William Frederick Lemke Union		Norman Mattoon Thomas Socialist		Margin		Total votes cast
County	#	%	#	%	#	%	#	%	#	%	#	%	Total votes cast
Appling	1,309	89.84%	140	9.61%	3	0.21%	5	0.34%	0	0.00%	1,169	80.23%	1,457
Atkinson	958	97.06%	29	2.94%	0	0.00%	0	0.00%	0	0.00%	929	94.12%	987
Bacon	929	93.74%	62	6.26%	0	0.00%	0	0.00%	0	0.00%	867	87.49%	991
Baker	599	97.72%	13	2.12%	1	0.16%	0	0.00%	0	0.00%	586	95.60%	613
Baldwin	811	87.58%	113	12.20%	2	0.22%	0	0.00%	0	0.00%	698	75.38%	926
Banks	641	77.98%	181	22.02%	0	0.00%	0	0.00%	0	0.00%	460	55.96%	822
Barrow	1,181	87.16%	172	12.69%	2	0.15%	0	0.00%	0	0.00%	1,009	74.46%	1,355
Bartow	2,228	83.13%	444	16.57%	6	0.22%	2	0.07%	0	0.00%	1,784	66.57%	2,680
Ben Hill	1,147	88.64%	146	11.28%	1	0.08%	0	0.00%	0	0.00%	1,001	77.36%	1,294
Berrien	1,700	96.98%	53	3.02%	0	0.00%	0	0.00%	0	0.00%	1,647	93.95%	1,753
Bibb	5,722	92.34%	452	7.29%	22	0.36%	1	0.02%	0	0.00%	5,270	85.04%	6,197
Bleckley	649	90.14%	69	9.58%	2	0.28%	0	0.00%	0	0.00%	580	80.56%	720
Brantley	527	92.13%	40	6.99%	5	0.87%	0	0.00%	0	0.00%	487	85.14%	572
Brooks	1,277	92.74%	94	6.83%	6	0.44%	0	0.00%	0	0.00%	1,183	85.91%	1,377
Bryan	632	90.41%	63	9.01%	4	0.57%	0	0.00%	0	0.00%	569	81.40%	699
Bulloch	1,978	96.53%	66	3.22%	5	0.24%	0	0.00%	0	0.00%	1,912	93.31%	2,049
Burke	1,040	95.06%	51	4.66%	3	0.27%	0	0.00%	0	0.00%	989	90.40%	1,094
Butts	820	96.13%	28	3.28%	5	0.59%	0	0.00%	0	0.00%	792	92.85%	853
Calhoun	777	97.98%	14	1.77%	2	0.25%	0	0.00%	0	0.00%	763	96.22%	793
Camden	515	90.19%	53	9.28%	2	0.35%	1	0.18%	0	0.00%	462	80.91%	571
Candler	992	92.28%	80	7.44%	3	0.28%	0	0.00%	0	0.00%	912	84.84%	1,075
Carroll	3,717	84.98%	653	14.93%	4	0.09%	0	0.00%	0	0.00%	3,064	70.05%	4,374
Catoosa	1,018	82.16%	218	17.59%	1	0.08%	1	0.08%	1	0.08%	800	64.57%	1,239
Charlton	468	94.16%	28	5.63%	1	0.20%	0	0.00%	0	0.00%	440	88.53%	497
Chatham	10,019	88.90%	1,227	10.89%	14	0.12%	4	0.04%	6	0.05%	8,792	78.01%	11,270
Chattahoochee	206	91.15%	20	8.85%	0	0.00%	0	0.00%	0	0.00%	186	82.30%	226
Chattooga	2,999	92.79%	231	7.15%	2	0.06%	0	0.00%	0	0.00%	2,768	85.64%	3,232
Cherokee	1,211	58.79%	842	40.87%	6	0.29%	1	0.05%	0	0.00%	369	17.91%	2,060
Clarke	2,632	94.13%	160	5.72%	3	0.11%	1	0.04%	0	0.00%	2,472	88.41%	2,796
Clay	484	96.99%	13	2.61%	2	0.40%	0	0.00%	0	0.00%	471	94.39%	499
Clayton	1,352	88.37%	175	11.44%	3	0.20%	0	0.00%	0	0.00%	1,177	76.93%	1,530
Clinch	1,002	93.21%	71	6.60%	2	0.19%	0	0.00%	0	0.00%	931	86.60%	1,075
Cobb	2,802	79.72%	707	20.11%	6	0.17%	0	0.00%	0	0.00%	2,095	59.60%	3,515
Coffee	1,702	93.57%	116	6.38%	1	0.05%	0	0.00%	0	0.00%	1,586	87.19%	1,819
Colquitt	2,449	84.42%	448	15.44%	3	0.10%	1	0.03%	0	0.00%	2,001	68.98%	2,901
Columbia	659	94.14%	34	4.86%	7	1.00%	0	0.00%	0	0.00%	625	89.29%	700
Cook	1,697	93.45%	117	6.44%	1	0.06%	1	0.06%	0	0.00%	1,580	87.00%	1,816
Coweta	2,260	96.79%	73	3.13%	2	0.09%	0	0.00%	0	0.00%	2,187	93.66%	2,335
Crawford	413	94.51%	22	5.03%	2	0.46%	0	0.00%	0	0.00%	391	89.47%	437
Crisp	1,029	92.70%	79	7.12%	2	0.18%	0	0.00%	0	0.00%	950	85.59%	1,110
Dade	857	87.01%	127	12.89%	1	0.10%	0	0.00%	0	0.00%	730	74.11%	985
Dawson	377	53.93%	322	46.07%	0	0.00%	0	0.00%	0	0.00%	55	7.87%	699
Decatur	1,965	95.71%	79	3.85%	4	0.19%	1	0.05%	4	0.19%	1,886	91.86%	2,053
DeKalb	7,391	86.34%	1,137	13.28%	17	0.20%	4	0.05%	11	0.13%	6,254	73.06%	8,560
Dodge	1,259	94.24%	71	5.31%	2	0.15%	4	0.30%	0	0.00%	1,188	88.92%	1,336
Dooly	1,339	97.03%	41	2.97%	0	0.00%	0	0.00%	0	0.00%	1,298	94.06%	1,380
Dougherty	2,591	95.40%	122	4.49%	1	0.04%	2	0.07%	0	0.00%	2,469	90.91%	2,716
Douglas	1,015	80.88%	237	18.88%	1	0.08%	2	0.16%	0	0.00%	778	61.99%	1,255
Early	1,107	95.68%	46	3.98%	1	0.09%	2	0.17%	1	0.09%	1,061	91.70%	1,157
Echols	300	90.63%	30	9.06%	1	0.30%	0	0.00%	0	0.00%	270	81.57%	331
Effingham	612	81.06%	142	18.81%	1	0.13%	0	0.00%	0	0.00%	470	62.25%	755
Elbert	1,772	79.39%	438	19.62%	21	0.94%	1	0.04%	0	0.00%	1,334	59.77%	2,232
Emanuel	1,943	93.37%	125	6.01%	6	0.29%	7	0.34%	0	0.00%	1,818	87.36%	2,081
Evans	733	95.07%	35	4.54%	3	0.39%	0	0.00%	0	0.00%	698	90.53%	771
Fannin	1,540	44.90%	1,890	55.10%	0	0.00%	0	0.00%	0	0.00%	-350	-10.20%	3,430
Fayette	748	91.33%	70	8.55%	1	0.12%	0	0.00%	0	0.00%	678	82.78%	819
Floyd	5,499	89.87%	612	10.00%	6	0.10%	1	0.02%	1	0.02%	4,887	79.87%	6,119
Forsyth	780	58.60%	551	41.40%	0	0.00%	0	0.00%	0	0.00%	229	17.21%	1,331
Franklin	1,621	86.73%	238	12.73%	8	0.43%	1	0.05%	1	0.05%	1,383	74.00%	1,869
Fulton	27,183	88.17%	3,552	11.52%	54	0.18%	20	0.06%	20	0.06%	23,631	76.65%	30,829
Gilmer	1,128	51.86%	1,047	48.14%	0	0.00%	0	0.00%	0	0.00%	81	3.72%	2,175
Glascock	369	83.86%	68	15.45%	3	0.68%	0	0.00%	0	0.00%	301	68.41%	440
Glynn	1,925	87.98%	260	11.88%	1	0.05%	1	0.05%	1	0.05%	1,665	76.10%	2,188
Gordon	2,026	79.86%	504	19.87%	7	0.28%	0	0.00%	0	0.00%	1,522	59.99%	2,537
Grady	1,659	90.71%	163	8.91%	6	0.33%	1	0.05%	0	0.00%	1,496	81.79%	1,829
Greene	1,348	93.35%	86	5.96%	10	0.69%	0	0.00%	0	0.00%	1,262	87.40%	1,444
Gwinnett	2,382	81.41%	541	18.49%	3	0.10%	0	0.00%	0	0.00%	1,841	62.92%	2,926
Habersham	1,884	80.93%	424	18.21%	16	0.69%	4	0.17%	0	0.00%	1,460	62.71%	2,328
Hall	2,731	85.85%	444	13.96%	6	0.19%	0	0.00%	0	0.00%	2,287	71.90%	3,181
Hancock	504	88.42%	57	10.00%	9	1.58%	0	0.00%	0	0.00%	447	78.42%	570
Haralson	1,643	67.39%	787	32.28%	6	0.25%	1	0.04%	1	0.04%	856	35.11%	2,438
Harris	953	94.54%	54	5.36%	1	0.10%	0	0.00%	0	0.00%	899	89.19%	1,008
Hart	1,514	86.96%	222	12.75%	5	0.29%	0	0.00%	0	0.00%	1,292	74.21%	1,741
Heard	725	82.11%	155	17.55%	3	0.34%	0	0.00%	0	0.00%	570	64.55%	883
Henry	1,362	91.90%	116	7.83%	3	0.20%	1	0.07%	0	0.00%	1,246	84.08%	1,482
Houston	796	95.56%	37	4.44%	0	0.00%	0	0.00%	0	0.00%	759	91.12%	833
Irwin	1,025	89.83%	110	9.64%	5	0.44%	1	0.09%	0	0.00%	915	80.19%	1,141
Jackson	2,447	92.76%	187	7.09%	4	0.15%	0	0.00%	0	0.00%	2,260	85.67%	2,638
Jasper	923	96.55%	33	3.45%	0	0.00%	0	0.00%	0	0.00%	890	93.10%	956
Jeff Davis	631	87.15%	93	12.85%	0	0.00%	0	0.00%	0	0.00%	538	74.31%	724
Jefferson	1,238	87.31%	168	11.85%	10	0.71%	1	0.07%	1	0.07%	1,070	75.46%	1,418
Jenkins	880	96.49%	32	3.51%	0	0.00%	0	0.00%	0	0.00%	848	92.98%	912
Johnson	1,861	84.40%	334	15.15%	10	0.45%	0	0.00%	0	0.00%	1,527	69.25%	2,205
Jones	508	95.67%	23	4.33%	0	0.00%	0	0.00%	0	0.00%	485	91.34%	531
Lamar	839	92.30%	69	7.59%	1	0.11%	0	0.00%	0	0.00%	770	84.71%	909
Lanier	800	95.81%	30	3.59%	5	0.60%	0	0.00%	0	0.00%	770	92.22%	835
Laurens	2,620	89.39%	304	10.37%	7	0.24%	0	0.00%	0	0.00%	2,316	79.02%	2,931
Lee	490	99.59%	1	0.20%	1	0.20%	0	0.00%	0	0.00%	489	99.39%	492
Liberty	369	87.65%	49	11.64%	2	0.48%	1	0.24%	0	0.00%	320	76.01%	421
Lincoln	561	84.23%	88	13.21%	17	2.55%	0	0.00%	0	0.00%	473	71.02%	666
Long	305	84.96%	51	14.21%	2	0.56%	1	0.28%	0	0.00%	254	70.75%	359
Lowndes	3,099	94.89%	130	3.98%	8	0.24%	27	0.83%	2	0.06%	2,969	90.91%	3,266
Lumpkin	617	79.41%	160	20.59%	0	0.00%	0	0.00%	0	0.00%	457	58.82%	777
Macon	958	90.98%	92	8.74%	2	0.19%	1	0.09%	0	0.00%	866	82.24%	1,053
Madison	1,697	80.89%	393	18.73%	8	0.38%	0	0.00%	0	0.00%	1,304	62.15%	2,098
Marion	420	86.96%	62	12.84%	1	0.21%	0	0.00%	0	0.00%	358	74.12%	483
McDuffie	705	87.14%	98	12.11%	6	0.74%	0	0.00%	0	0.00%	607	75.03%	809
McIntosh	308	85.32%	53	14.68%	0	0.00%	0	0.00%	0	0.00%	255	70.64%	361
Meriwether	2,438	94.61%	138	5.36%	1	0.04%	0	0.00%	0	0.00%	2,300	89.25%	2,577
Miller	653	94.64%	36	5.22%	1	0.14%	0	0.00%	0	0.00%	617	89.42%	690
Mitchell	2,297	96.47%	79	3.32%	3	0.13%	1	0.04%	1	0.04%	2,218	93.15%	2,381
Monroe	1,277	89.24%	147	10.27%	7	0.49%	0	0.00%	0	0.00%	1,130	78.97%	1,431
Montgomery	945	91.39%	81	7.83%	5	0.48%	3	0.29%	0	0.00%	864	83.56%	1,034
Morgan	1,130	96.66%	37	3.17%	2	0.17%	0	0.00%	0	0.00%	1,093	93.50%	1,169
Murray	1,597	66.43%	806	33.53%	1	0.04%	0	0.00%	0	0.00%	791	32.90%	2,404
Muscogee	5,009	91.56%	455	8.32%	7	0.13%	0	0.00%	0	0.00%	4,554	83.24%	5,471
Newton	1,994	93.79%	123	5.79%	8	0.38%	1	0.05%	0	0.00%	1,871	88.01%	2,126
Oconee	483	73.29%	173	26.25%	3	0.46%	0	0.00%	0	0.00%	310	47.04%	659
Oglethorpe	845	87.66%	115	11.93%	4	0.41%	0	0.00%	0	0.00%	730	75.73%	964
Paulding	1,386	68.14%	645	31.71%	3	0.15%	0	0.00%	0	0.00%	741	36.43%	2,034
Peach	767	92.52%	49	5.91%	12	1.45%	1	0.12%	0	0.00%	718	86.61%	829
Pickens	1,223	53.73%	1,053	46.27%	0	0.00%	0	0.00%	0	0.00%	170	7.47%	2,276
Pierce	1,494	96.45%	45	2.91%	7	0.45%	3	0.19%	0	0.00%	1,449	93.54%	1,549
Pike	910	85.69%	149	14.03%	1	0.09%	2	0.19%	0	0.00%	761	71.66%	1,062
Polk	2,754	87.51%	389	12.36%	4	0.13%	0	0.00%	0	0.00%	2,365	75.15%	3,147
Pulaski	808	94.61%	38	4.45%	7	0.82%	1	0.12%	0	0.00%	770	90.16%	854
Putnam	703	93.11%	51	6.75%	1	0.13%	0	0.00%	0	0.00%	652	86.36%	755
Quitman	355	94.92%	19	5.08%	0	0.00%	0	0.00%	0	0.00%	336	89.84%	374
Rabun	948	85.33%	162	14.58%	1	0.09%	0	0.00%	0	0.00%	786	70.75%	1,111
Randolph	1,208	93.86%	74	5.75%	5	0.39%	0	0.00%	0	0.00%	1,134	88.11%	1,287
Richmond	7,239	92.69%	551	7.06%	16	0.20%	1	0.01%	3	0.04%	6,688	85.63%	7,810
Rockdale	837	91.88%	73	8.01%	1	0.11%	0	0.00%	0	0.00%	764	83.86%	911
Schley	419	90.69%	43	9.31%	0	0.00%	0	0.00%	0	0.00%	376	81.39%	462
Screven	933	92.47%	61	6.05%	15	1.49%	0	0.00%	0	0.00%	872	86.42%	1,009
Seminole	761	90.27%	82	9.73%	0	0.00%	0	0.00%	0	0.00%	679	80.55%	843
Spalding	2,457	98.28%	36	1.44%	3	0.12%	3	0.12%	1	0.04%	2,421	96.84%	2,500
Stephens	1,142	94.22%	68	5.61%	2	0.17%	0	0.00%	0	0.00%	1,074	88.61%	1,212
Stewart	628	92.22%	49	7.20%	2	0.29%	2	0.29%	0	0.00%	579	85.02%	681
Sumter	1,870	96.69%	58	3.00%	6	0.31%	0	0.00%	0	0.00%	1,812	93.69%	1,934
Talbot	796	94.42%	41	4.86%	6	0.71%	0	0.00%	0	0.00%	755	89.56%	843
Taliaferro	552	96.34%	14	2.44%	7	1.22%	0	0.00%	0	0.00%	538	93.89%	573
Tattnall	1,047	82.31%	214	16.82%	11	0.86%	0	0.00%	0	0.00%	833	65.49%	1,272
Taylor	771	83.71%	147	15.96%	3	0.33%	0	0.00%	0	0.00%	624	67.75%	921
Telfair	1,158	90.54%	121	9.46%	0	0.00%	0	0.00%	0	0.00%	1,037	81.08%	1,279
Terrell	1,336	95.50%	61	4.36%	2	0.14%	0	0.00%	0	0.00%	1,275	91.14%	1,399
Thomas	2,409	91.08%	222	8.39%	13	0.49%	1	0.04%	0	0.00%	2,187	82.68%	2,645
Tift	1,627	90.49%	161	8.95%	10	0.56%	0	0.00%	0	0.00%	1,466	81.54%	1,798
Toombs	1,001	92.43%	78	7.20%	4	0.37%	0	0.00%	0	0.00%	923	85.23%	1,083
Towns	763	51.04%	732	48.96%	0	0.00%	0	0.00%	0	0.00%	31	2.07%	1,495
Treutlen	912	97.44%	23	2.46%	1	0.11%	0	0.00%	0	0.00%	889	94.98%	936
Troup	2,728	94.13%	167	5.76%	3	0.10%	0	0.00%	0	0.00%	2,561	88.37%	2,898
Turner	860	82.06%	188	17.94%	0	0.00%	0	0.00%	0	0.00%	672	64.12%	1,048
Twiggs	491	89.44%	57	10.38%	1	0.18%	0	0.00%	0	0.00%	434	79.05%	549
Union	1,148	59.45%	783	40.55%	0	0.00%	0	0.00%	0	0.00%	365	18.90%	1,931
Upson	1,471	91.37%	138	8.57%	1	0.06%	0	0.00%	0	0.00%	1,333	82.80%	1,610
Walker	2,313	83.32%	458	16.50%	4	0.14%	1	0.04%	0	0.00%	1,855	66.82%	2,776
Walton	1,952	93.58%	132	6.33%	2	0.10%	0	0.00%	0	0.00%	1,820	87.25%	2,086
Ware	2,566	90.77%	256	9.06%	5	0.18%	0	0.00%	0	0.00%	2,310	81.71%	2,827
Warren	545	79.91%	129	18.91%	8	1.17%	0	0.00%	0	0.00%	416	61.00%	682
Washington	1,286	89.24%	149	10.34%	6	0.42%	0	0.00%	0	0.00%	1,137	78.90%	1,441
Wayne	788	87.65%	105	11.68%	6	0.67%	0	0.00%	0	0.00%	683	75.97%	899
Webster	310	88.32%	40	11.40%	1	0.28%	0	0.00%	0	0.00%	270	76.92%	351
Wheeler	594	86.21%	94	13.64%	1	0.15%	0	0.00%	0	0.00%	500	72.57%	689
White	599	78.82%	161	21.18%	0	0.00%	0	0.00%	0	0.00%	438	57.63%	760
Whitfield	2,481	73.69%	877	26.05%	7	0.21%	1	0.03%	1	0.03%	1,604	47.64%	3,367
Wilcox	1,066	84.40%	195	15.44%	2	0.16%	0	0.00%	0	0.00%	871	68.96%	1,263
Wilkes	1,031	91.89%	78	6.95%	13	1.16%	0	0.00%	0	0.00%	953	84.94%	1,122
Wilkinson	695	84.96%	118	14.43%	5	0.61%	0	0.00%	0	0.00%	577	70.54%	818
Worth	1,124	89.42%	132	10.50%	1	0.08%	0	0.00%	0	0.00%	992	78.92%	1,257
Totals	255,363	87.10%	36,943	12.60%	660	0.23%	141	0.05%	68	0.02%	218,420	74.50%	293,175

==== Counties that flipped from Republican to Democratic ====
- Towns
