= James Metcalf =

James Metcalf may refer to:

- Jim Metcalf (footballer) (1898–1975), English footballer
- Jim Metcalf (1920–1977), American journalist in Louisiana
- James Metcalf (artist) (1925–2012), American sculptor and artist
- JJ Metcalf (born 1988), English boxer

== See also ==
- James Medcalf (1895–1980), English footballer
- James Metcalfe (disambiguation)
- Metcalf (disambiguation)
