= Newton Jenkins =

American attorney (1887-1942)

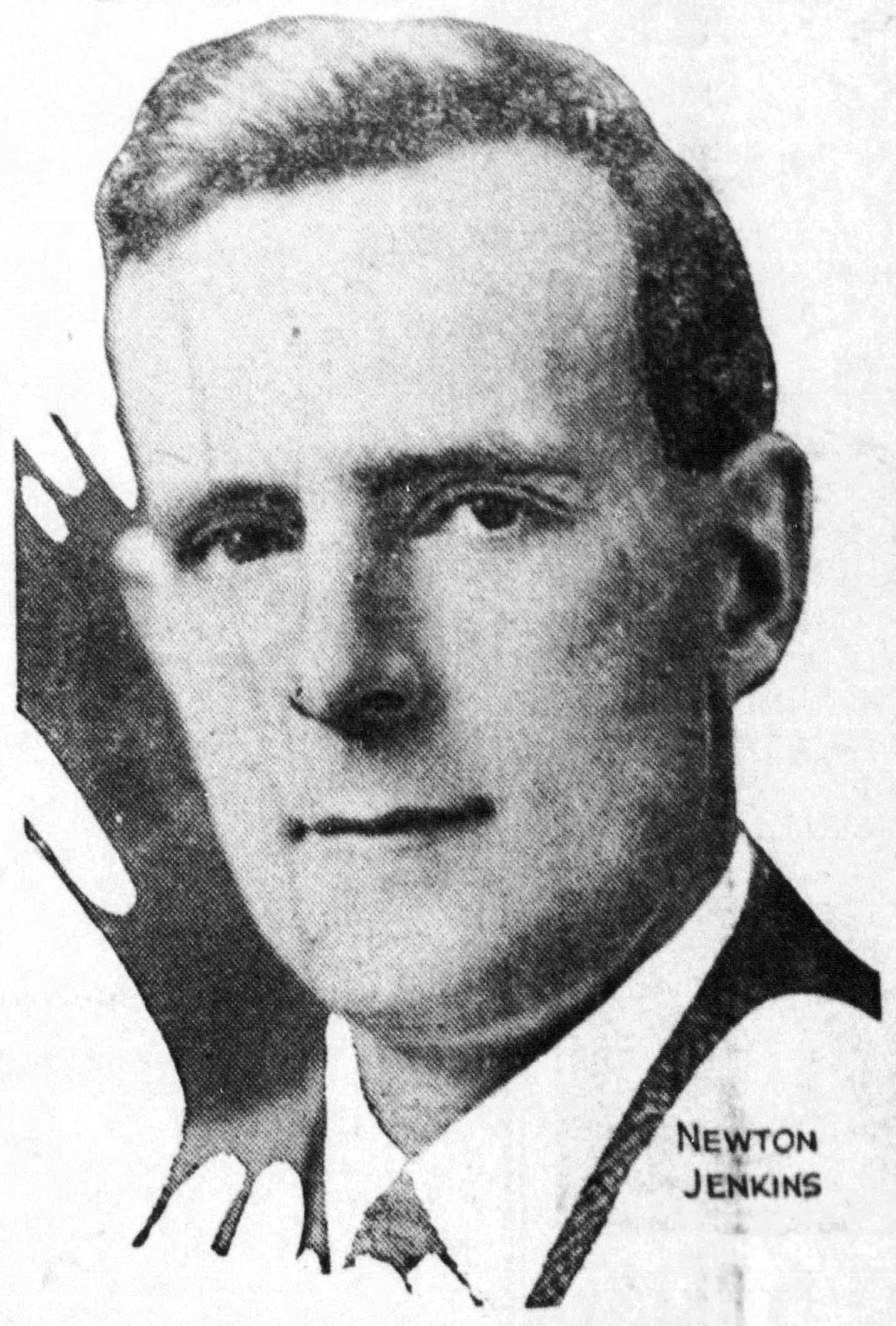
Jenkins in 1924

Isaac Newton Jenkins (August 19, 1887 – October 16, 1942) was an American attorney, soldier, and political candidate. A perennial candidate for political office, Jenkins ran for office in Illinois many times. He originally ran as a Robert La Follette-aligned progressive member of the Republican Party in the 1920s. Beginning in the mid-1930s, Jenkins publicly espoused antisemitic and fascist views and aligned himself with Adolf Hitler and other Nazis. He associated with other American pro-fascists. He was a figure in the short-lived Union Party, and served as the director of William Lemke's 1936 campaign as the party's presidential nominee.

== Military career ==
During World War I, Jenkins served in the 5th Regiment of the United States Marines as a lieutenant. He later served with France's 5th Army.

== Legal and business career ==
Jenkins established himself as a prominent attorney in Chicago. He was the attorney for the Pure Milk association (a dairy cooperative selling organization) since its inception. He was also a member of the Cook County Farm Bureau. He was, at one time, president of the Jefferson Park Business Men's Association.

== Early (progressive) political career ==
=== 1920 Chicago aldermanic candidacy ===
Jenkins made his first run for political office in 1920, when he ran to be Chicago alderman of the 27th Ward.

=== 1924, 1930, and 1932 U.S. Senate candidacies ===
Jenkins thrice ran in Illinois for the United States Senate. He first ran in the Republican Party's primary for the 1924 United States Senate election in Illinois on a Robert La Follette-aligned platform. Samuel George Blythe described Jenkins as having run on a, "farmer-labor near bolshevik platform." While Jenkins ran a left-wing campaign, he performed his strongest in downstate Illinois than in Cook County, Illinois, despite Cook County being home to a more traditionally left-wing constituency. This was an indicator that his platform had appealed to downstate farmers. Jenkins placed third in the primary, receiving 114,239 votes. This gave him 13.32% of the vote, compared to Charles S. Deneen's 41.70% and incumbent Medill McCormick's 41.01%.

During the 1930 Illinois U.S. Senate race again ran for U.S. Senate, challenging incumbent Charles S. Deneen for the Republican Party nomination. He and Deneen both lost to Ruth Hanna McCormick. Jenkins received 161,261 votes. This gave him 11.43% of the vote, compared to McCormick's 50.66% and Deneen's 35.19%.

Jenkins ran a third time for U.S. Senate in the Republican primary of the 1932 United States Senate election in Illinois. During his campaign, Jenkins supported the proposed Capper-Kelly Fair Trade Bill. Jenkins received 405,387 votes, placing a distant second behind incumbent Otis F. Glenn. He won 37.98% of the vote to Glenn's 53.62%.

During these campaigns, Jenkins built a sizable base of support in organizations for famers and organizations for retired military servicemen.

== Later (fascist) political career ==
By the mid-1930s, Jenkins' politics had taken a highly pronounced turn to fascism.

=== 1935 Chicago mayoral candidacy ===
In 1935, Jenkins ran for mayor of Chicago as an independent candidate. Jenkins still promoted himself as a "progressive" candidate. However, he adopted outright fascist and antisemitic politics and now stood in fierce opposition to such progressive causes as labor movements.

Jenkins' run was supported by his Third Party, which was an effort to launch a new political party. The party claimed itself to be spun-off from the progressive Republican movement. The party, which intended to use "U.S., Unite" as its national slogan and utilize the buffalo as its mascot, sought to use Jenkins' candidacy as a national launchpad. However, Third Party was regarded to be "openly fascist". The July 10, 1935, edition of the American Guardian newspaper wrote that Jenkins had,

Established contact with the Chicago Nazi organization, has appeared on platforms with uniformed Nazis at their official meetings, is openly anti-Semitic and has announced as part of his policy the formation of highly militarized storm troops to defend and protect the interests of his party. The Jenkins [Third Party] is also anti-labor, Jenkins having pescribed the lamp post hanging as the cure for all labor "agitators".

By the time of this campaign, Jenkins was openly very antisemitic. During his campaign, Jenkins published antisemitic literature.

The platform of the Third Party-backed slate of independent candidates in the 1935 Chicago municipal election was to create a city manager position in the city, to adopt the city commission-style of government in Chicago, to create jobs for the head of family of 100,000 households, to eliminate taxes in the city, and to end "corrupt elections".

Jenkins placed third of three candidates in the mayoral election with 87,726 votes. He received 8.34% of the vote, to incumbent Democrat Edward Joseph Kelly's 75.84% and Republican nominee Emil C. Wetten's 15.83%.

=== Union Party and 1936 U.S. Senate candidacy ===
Soon after the mayoral election, in March 1936 Jenkins declared his intention to run in the 1936 United States presidential election as the Third Party's nominee. However, the Third Party merged into the Union Party, which was backing William Lemke's presidential candidacy. As leader of the Union Party, Lemke had first approached the Third Party during the mayoral election about merging their efforts to establish a third major political party. Jenkins became the leader of the Illinois state chapter of the Union Party - the Union Progressive Party - and served as the director of Lemke's Union Party candidacy in the presidential election. Jenkins also ran as the party's nominee in the 1936 U.S. Senate election in Illinois. Jenkins placed a distant third, receiving 93,696 votes. This gave him 2.47% of the vote to incumbent Democrat J. Hamilton Lewis's 56.47% and Republican nominee Otis F. Glenn's 40.72%

=== Continued fascist activism ===
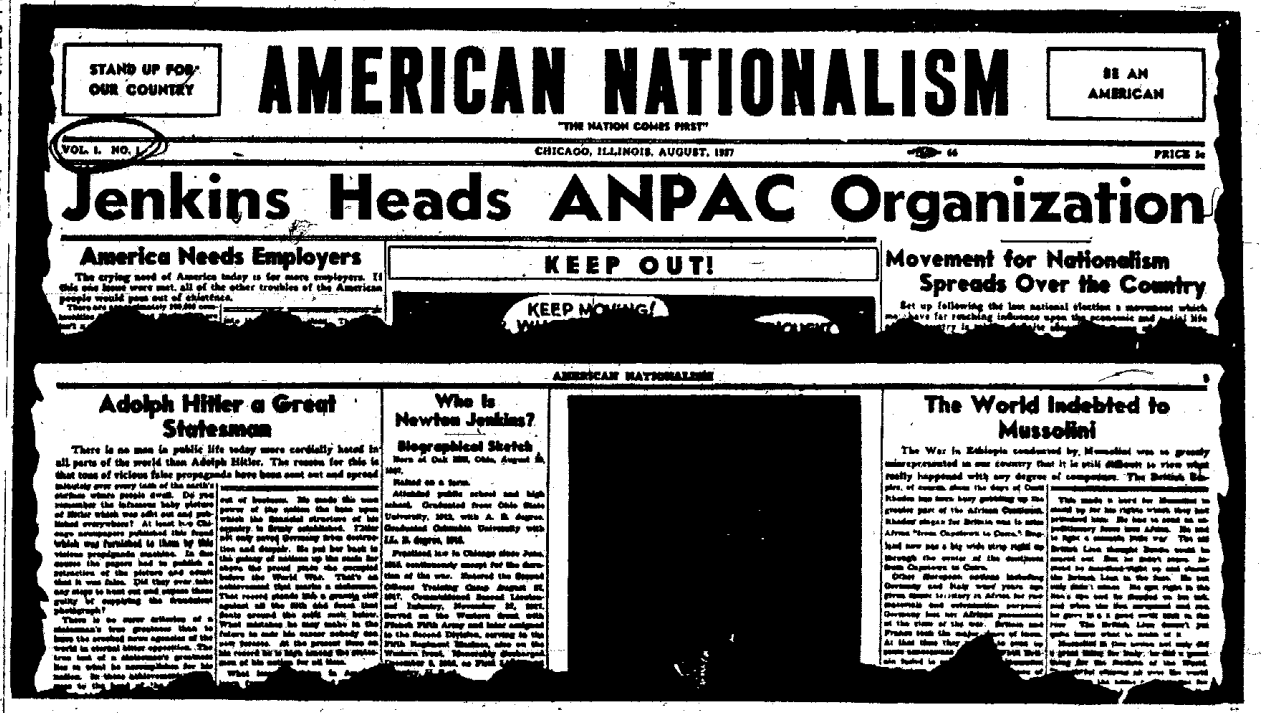
Excerpts from the first edition of American Nationalism (as republished to illustrate the exposé on Jenkins in the September 12, 1937 edition of the Chicago Times)

Jenkins endorsed the political views of Adolf Hitler, the dictator of Germany and leader of the Nazi Party. In July 1937, Jenkins began publishing a newspaper titled American Nationalism. One article in the first edition of the newspaper opined that, "America needs men and women like Hitler to stir her from her lethargy." The newspaper also opined that, "the world [is] indebted to Mussolini." Another piece lambasted Fiorello La Guardia (the mayor of New York City) for his criticism of Hitler and for being (allegedly) influenced by his city's sizable Jewish population. An editorial had argued that efforts to unionize the workforce of the Ford Motor Company should be resisted by Henry Ford, who the editorial heralded as "one of the great business genius of all time". This first edition of the paper also announced that Jenkins would create an association called the American National Political Action Clubs (ANPAC). On August 8, 1937, Jenkins spoke in support of the political views of Hitler at a German American Bund convention in Kenosha, Wisconsin.

Jenkins' pro-Nazi work received attention from Chicago Times reporters-investigators James J. Metcalfe, John C. Metcalfe, and William Mueller: all of whom went undercover in the American Nazi groups to report on their activities, particularly focusing on the German American Bund. When the third installment in the series of reports the Chicago Times published as a result of their work was published as a front-page story on September 12, 1937. The main article focused extensively on Jenkins' activities. The article reported that Jenkins was, "attempting to united 'nationalist' groups in the third party", and that he was being heralded by attendees at Bund meetings as a "great American", as well as referred to with the honorific "Der Führer der Dritten Partei" for the Nazi political movement in the United States (translating to "leader of the Third party" in the German language). The article quoted Jenkins as telling the Bund's July 1937 national convention at Camp Siegfried in New York state,

I am not of German blood, and I do not speak [the] German [language], but I believe your organization is working for a better American and I am for you. There are things in the United States such as the CIO which are working against the true Americans. We should all work together to stamp out these evils."

The article reported that a Bund unit leader had confided in James J. Metcalfe that Jenkins intended to unite "125 national organizations" under the banner of his Third Party, with "American-Germans...at the top of this merger," but that Jenkins himself had told him that the Bund would not be at the top of his planned merger, due to his belief that they lacked great leadership. Jenkins opined that Firtz Gissibl (who had founded the Bund's precursor, Free Society of Teutonia, but had been deported from the United States) had been a "a great leader." It also quoted Jenkins as sharing that his intent in publishing American Nationalism was, "the hope of stirring up thought along the lines of a real, militant nationalist movement in the United States." In their 1938 testimony before the House Un-American Activities Committee, Jenkins' activities were discussed and evidence related to Jenkins was entered in to the congressional record.

In 1938, Jenkins self-published a book titled The Republic Reclaimed which presented his views that Jewish people were at fault for most of the world's problems. The book praised Mussolini and Italian fascists as well as Hitler and German Nazi fascists, containing a chapter on Adolf Hitler titled "Hitler Greatest German in All History". The book predicted that there would be a "man hunt" against the "traitors" he alleged were "selling the Republic to Jew power".

=== 1938 U.S Senate candidacy ===
In 1938, Jenkins ran unsuccessfully in the Democratic Party's U.S. Senate primary. He placed a distant third, receiving 32,808 votes. He received 2.04% of the vote to Scott W. Lucas's 49.92% and Michael L. Igoe's 45.23%.

=== Later activities ===
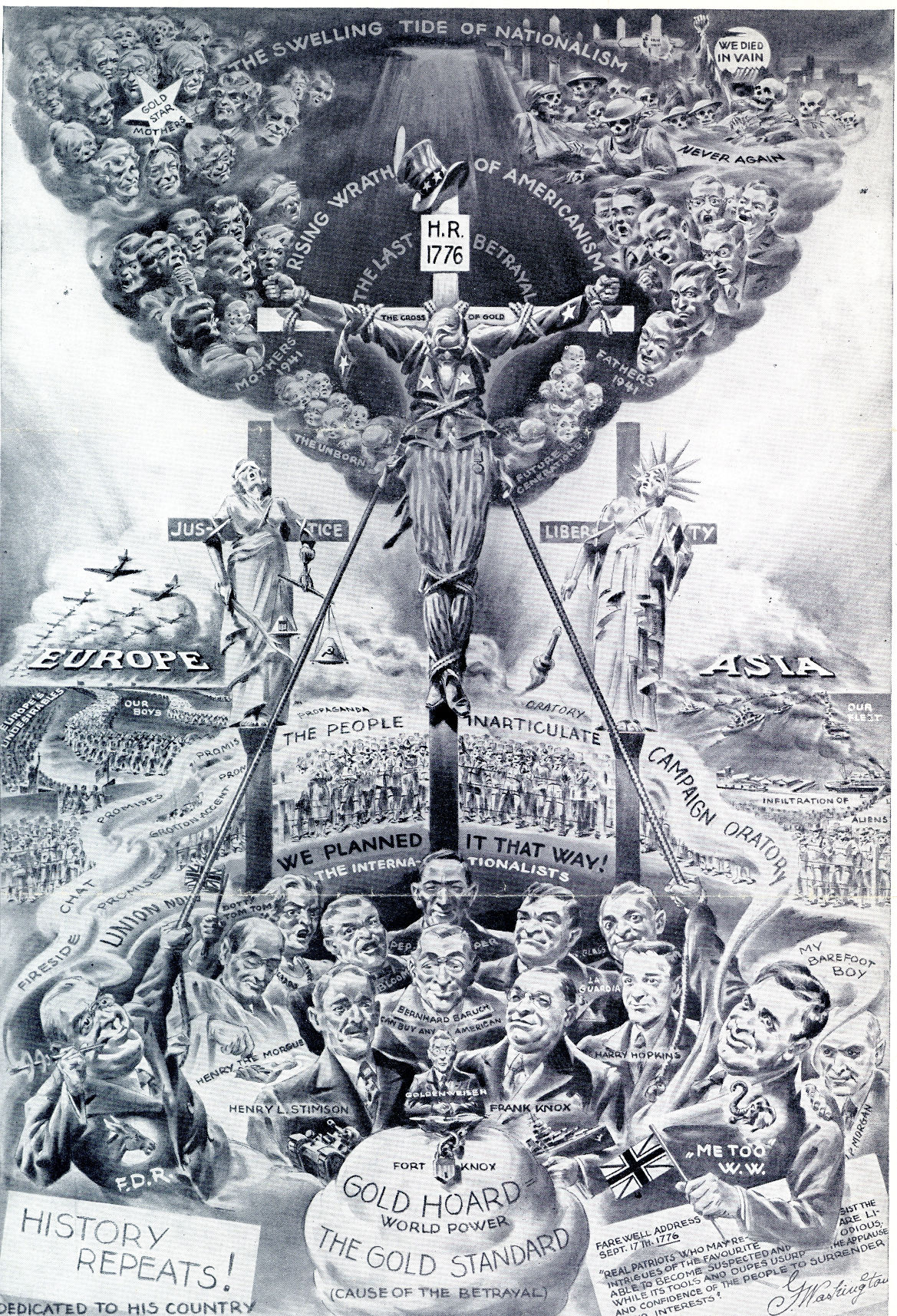
The "Uncle Sam crucifixion circular", likely distributed by Jenkins and Elizabeth Dilling

Among the American fascists that Jenkins associated himself with was Francis Parker Yockey.

By 1941, Jenkins worked with Elizabeth Dilling to run what the Anti-Defamation League (ADL) described in a memorandum as a "clearinghouse for anti-Semitic material". Through this operation, in 1941, they anonymously distributed in numerous cities a printing that the ADL dubbed the "Uncle Sam crucifixion circular" or the "new pro-Nazi circular" which portrayed several prominent Jewish figures as being among those involved in a conspiracy to bring the United States into World War II, and urged the United States to remain neutral. Per the findings of Maurice Fagan, the executive director of the Philadelphia Anti-Defamation Committee, the circular was the "brainchild" of Jenkins. ADL investigators found that John Winter of Chicago had printed the circular for them. A second circular surfaced soon after. Evidence found by ADL investigators indicated that the artwork featured in both circulars were likely created by artist Gustave A. Brand, who was the former city treasurer of Chicago.

== Death ==
Jenkins died of a heart ailment on October 16, 1942, at the age of 55.

== Electoral history ==
=== U.S. Senate ===
1924 United States Senate election in Illinois (Republican primary)
Party	Candidate	Votes	%
Republican	Charles S. Deneen	357,545	41.70
Republican	Medill McCormick (incumbent)	351,601	41.01
Republican	Newton Jenkins	114,239	13.32
Republican	Gilbert Gile Ogden	18,002	2.10
Republican	Adelbert McPherson	15,973	0.19
Write-in	Others	1	0.00
Total votes		857,361	100

1930 United States Senate election in Illinois (Republican primary)
Party	Candidate	Votes	%
Republican	Ruth Hanna McCormick	714,606	50.66
Republican	Charles S. Deneen (incumbent)	496,412	35.19
Republican	Newton Jenkins	161,261	11.43
Republican	Abe Lincoln Wisler	19,778	1.40
Republican	Adelbert McPherson	18,582	1.32
Total votes		1,410,639	100

1932 United States Senate election in Illinois (Republican primary)
Party	Candidate	Votes	%
Republican	Otis F. Glenn (incumbent)	572,382	53.62
Republican	Newton Jenkins	405,387	37.98
Republican	T.B. Wright	89,677	8.40
Total votes		1,067,446	100

1936 United States Senate election in Illinois
Party	Candidate	Votes	%
Democratic	J. Hamilton Lewis (incumbent)	2,142,887	56.47
Republican	Otis F. Glenn	1,545,170	40.72
Union Progressive	Newton Jenkins	93,696	2.47
Socialist	Arthur McDowell	7,405	0.20
Prohibition	Adah M. Hagler	3,298	0.09
Socialist Labor	Frank Schnur	2,208	0.06
Total votes		3,794,664	100

1938 United States Senate election in Illinois (Democratic primary)
Party	Candidate	Votes	%
Democratic	Scott W. Lucas	801,761	49.92
Democratic	Michael L. Igoe	726,477	45.23
Democratic	Newton Jenkins	32,808	2.04
Democratic	John J. Sullivan	31,964	1.99
Democratic	Albert Lagerstedt	13,236	0.82
Total votes		1,606,246	100

=== Mayor ===
1935 Chicago mayoral election
Party	Candidate	Votes	%
Democratic	Edward Joseph Kelly (incumbent)	798,150	75.84
Republican	Emil C. Wetten	166,571	15.83
Independent	Newton Jenkins	87,726	8.34
Turnout		1,052,447	100
