= 1924 United States Senate election in Illinois =

- November 4, 1924
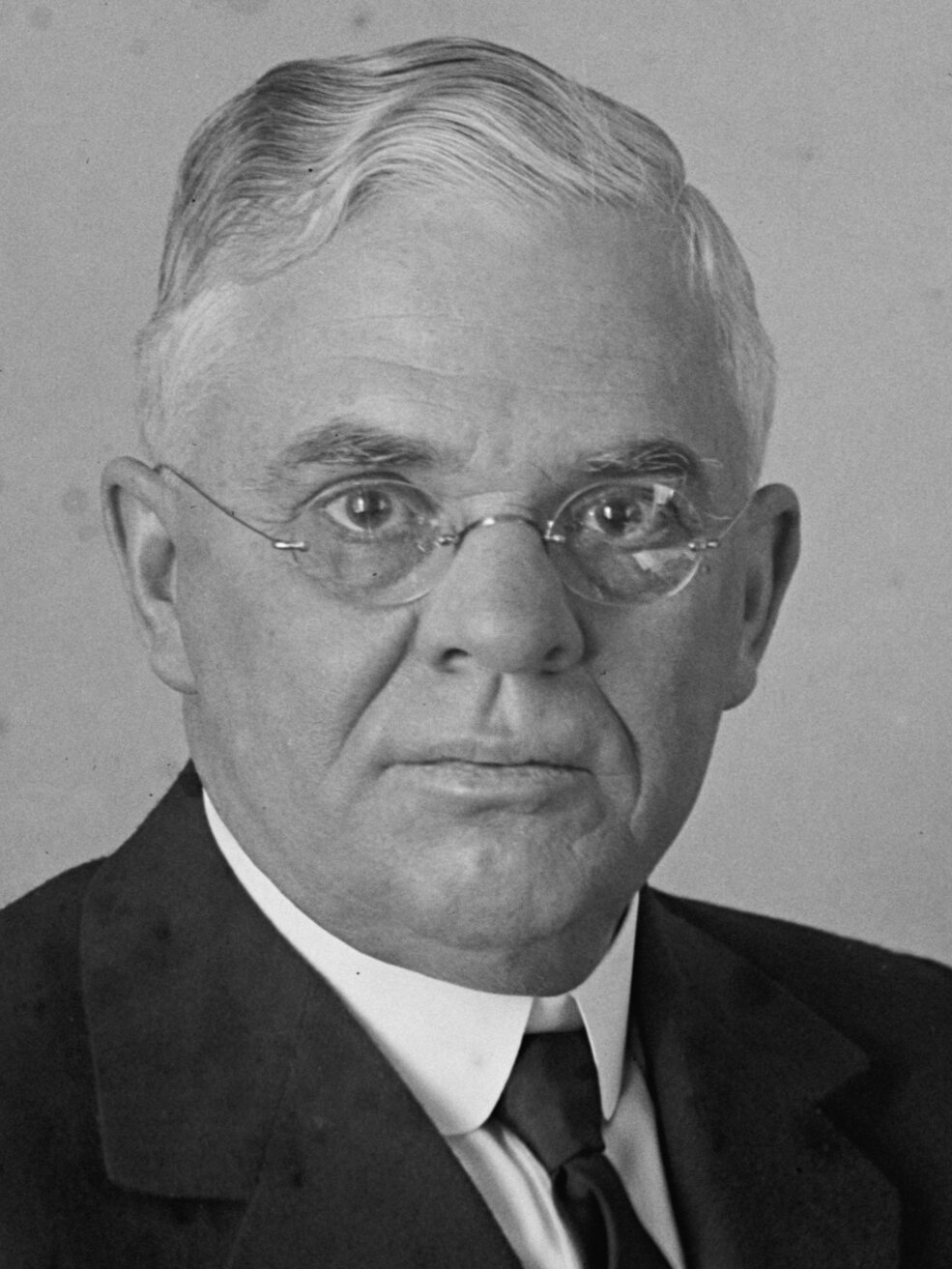

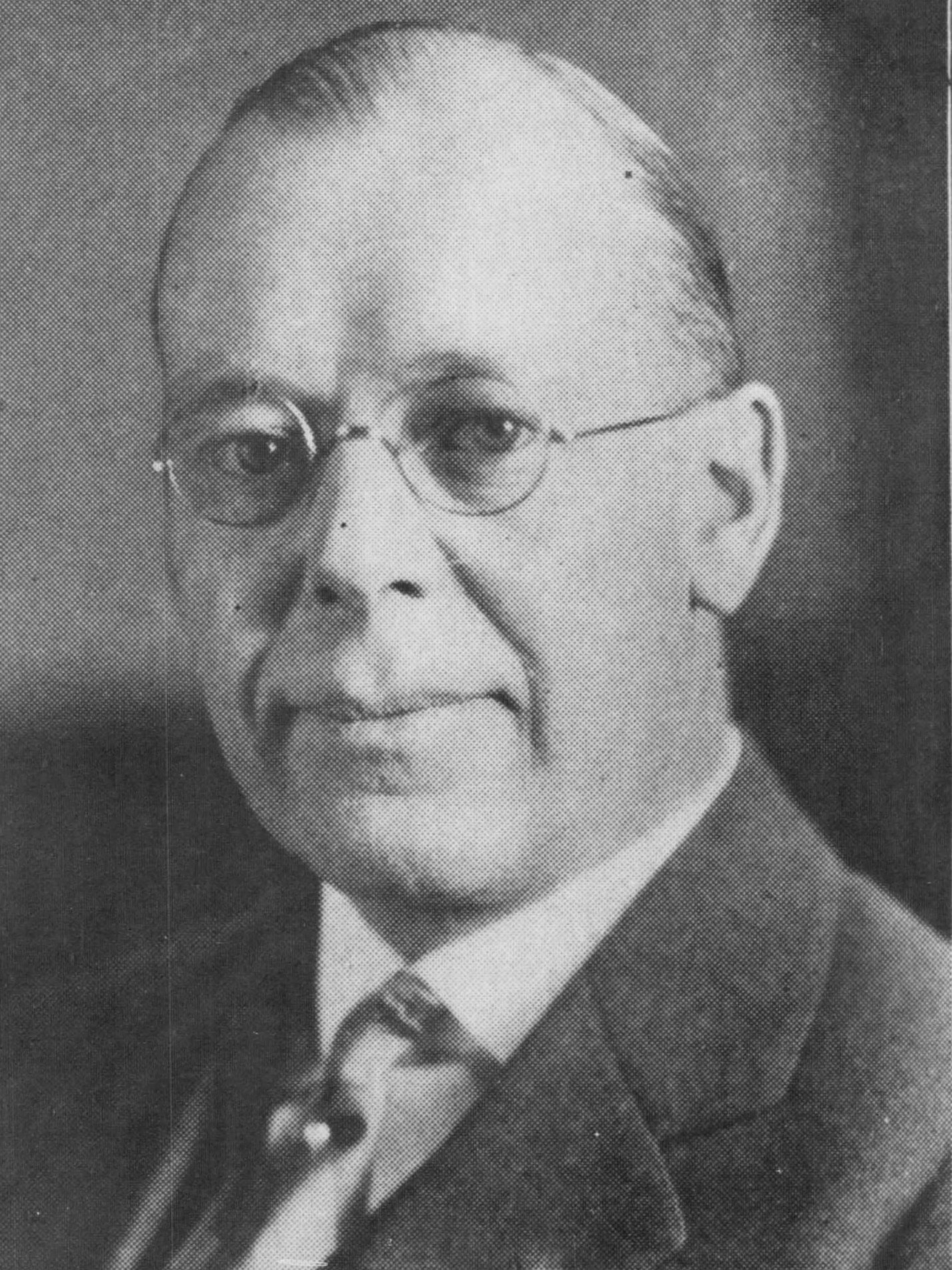
Nominee	Charles S. Deneen	Albert A. Sprague
Party	Republican	Democratic
Popular vote	1,449,180	806,702
Percentage	63.54%	35.37%
- County results Deneen: 40–50% 50–60% 60–70% 70–80% 80–90% Sprague: 50–60%
U.S. senator before election
Medill McCormick
Republican
Elected U.S. senator
Charles S. Deneen
Republican

The 1924 United States Senate election in Illinois took place on November 4, 1924.

Incumbent Republican Medill McCormick was unseated in the Republican primary by Charles S. Deneen, who went on to win the general election.

The primaries and general election coincided with those for other federal elections (president and House) and those for state elections. The primaries were held April 8, 1924.

This was the first election for this U.S. Senate seat to be held after the Nineteenth Amendment to the United States Constitution granted women suffrage.

== Democratic primary ==
=== Candidates ===
- William McKinley, former speaker of the Illinois House of Representatives (not to be confused with the William B. McKinley that, at the time, occupied the other Illinois U.S. Senate seat)
- Albert A. Sprague, chairman of Consolidated Grocers Corporation, and member of the John Crerar Library board

=== Results ===
Democratic primary
Party	Candidate	Votes	%
Democratic	Albert A. Sprague	169,285	62.67
Democratic	William McKinley	100,859	37.34
Write-in	Others	6	0.00
Total votes		270,150	100

== Republican primary ==
=== Candidates ===
- Charles S. Deneen, former governor of Illinois
- Newton Jenkins, lawyer and candidate for 27th Ward Chicago alderman in 1920
- Medill McCormick, incumbent U.S. senator
- Adelbert McPherson
- Gilbert Giles Ogden

=== Results ===
Deneen won by a mere 0.69% margin of just 5,944 votes.

Republican primary
Party	Candidate	Votes	%
Republican	Charles S. Deneen	357,545	41.70
Republican	Medill McCormick (incumbent)	351,601	41.01
Republican	Newton Jenkins	114,239	13.32
Republican	Gilbert Gile Ogden	18,002	2.10
Republican	Adelbert McPherson	15,973	0.19
Write-in	Others	1	0.00
Total votes		857,361	100

== Socialist primary ==
=== Candidates ===
- George Koop, perennial candidate

=== Results ===
Socialist primary
Party	Candidate	Votes	%
Socialist	George Koop	946	100
Total votes		946	100

== General election ==
=== Candidates ===
- Charles S. Deneen (Republican), former governor of Illinois
- J. Louis Engdahl (Workers), journalist and newspaper editor
- George Koop (Socialist), perennial candidate
- Parke Longworth (independent)
- Lewis D. Spaulding (Commonwealth Land)
- Albert A. Sprague (Democratic), chairman of Consolidated Grocers Corporation, and member of the John Crerar Library board
- Albert Wirth (Socialist Labor)

=== Results ===
1924 United States Senate election in Illinois
Party	Candidate	Votes	%
Republican	Charles S. Deneen	1,449,180	63.54
Democratic	Albert A. Sprague	806,702	35.37
Socialist	George Koop	18,708	0.82
Socialist Labor	Albert Wirth	2,966	0.13
Workers	J. Louis Engdahl	2,518	0.11
Commonwealth Land	Lewis D. Spaulding	391	0.02
Independent	Parke Longworth	382	0.02
Majority		642,478	28.17
Turnout		2,280,847	
Republican hold			

== Aftermath ==
On February 25, 1925, as he was preparing to leave office, McCormick died in what is considered to have been a suicide (though the suicidal nature of his death was not known to the public, contemporarily). His reelection loss is believed to have contributed to his suicide. McCormick's widow Ruth Hanna McCormick would go on to defeat Deneen in the 1930 Republican primary.

== See also ==
- 1924 United States Senate elections
