= Blaire Van Valkenburgh =

American paleontologist

- Born: October 13, 1952 (age 73); Washington, D.C.
- Citizenship: United States
- Education: Ph.D.
- Alma mater: Stockton State College; Johns Hopkins University
- Known for: quantitative analysis of ecological guild structure in fossil carnivores
- Awards: President, Society of Vertebrate Paleontology 2008-2010; Joseph T. Gregory Award, Society of Vertebrate Paleontology 2018; Romer-Simpson Medal, Society of Vertebrate Paleontology 2021
- Scientific career
- Fields: Vertebrate Paleontology, Paleobiology, Paleoecology
- Institutions: University of California Los Angeles (1986-Present)
- Thesis: (1984)
- Doctoral advisor: Robert Bakker
- Website: http://www.eeb.ucla.edu/indivfaculty.php?FacultyKey=1620

Blaire Van Valkenburgh is an American paleontologist and holds the Donald R. Dickey Chair in Vertebrate Biology in the Department of Ecology and Evolutionary Biology at University of California Los Angeles. She is a former president of Society of Vertebrate Paleontology.

== Early life and education ==
Van Valkenburgh was born in Washington, D.C., and raised in Alexandria, Virginia. Her mother, Lois Van Valkenburgh, was a civil rights activist. From 1964 to 1970, she attended T. C. Williams High School.

Van Valkenburgh received a bachelor's degree from Stockton State College in New Jersey in 1974, a Ph.D. in Vertebrate Paleobiology from Johns Hopkins University in 1984, where she worked with Robert Bakker, after which she worked as a postdoctoral fellow with Alan Walker at Johns Hopkins before moving to UCLA in 1986.

== Career ==
Van Valkenburgh is a paleontologist and holds the Donald R. Dickey Chair in Vertebrate Biology in the Department of Ecology and Evolutionary Biology at University of California Los Angeles. She has served as chair of the department and as associate dean of academic programs in the life sciences at UCLA.The focus of her research is the paleobiology and paleoecology of Carnivora. Her contributions include quantification of guild structure in fossil carnivore communities and the study of iterative evolution in carnivore feeding adaptations.

Van Valkenburgh served as president of the Society of Vertebrate Paleontology from 2008 to 2010 and as associate editor of the Journal of Vertebrate Paleontology from 2011 to 2017.
