= 1932 United States Senate election in Illinois =

- November 8, 1932
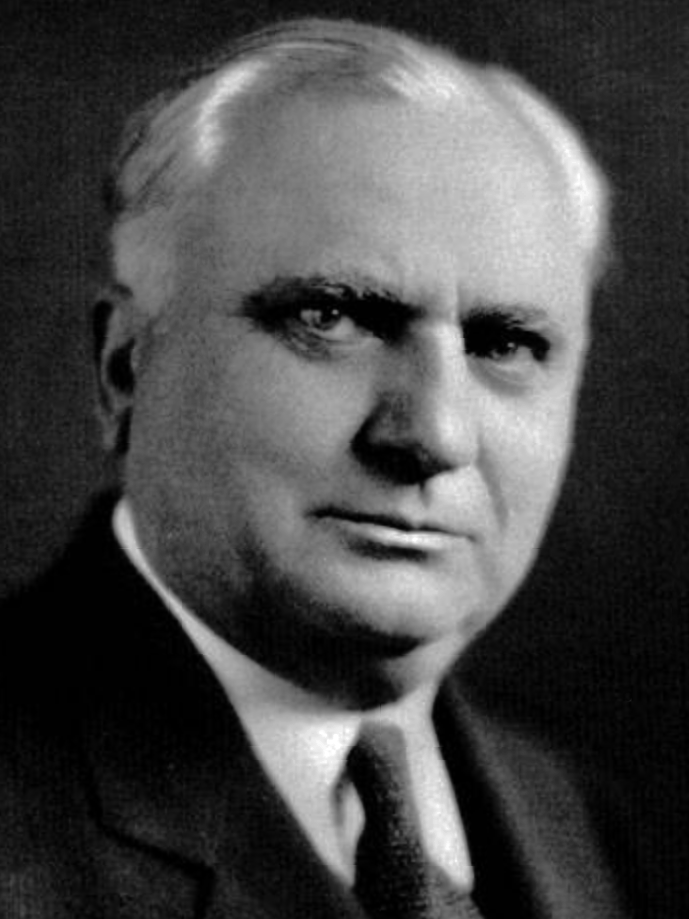

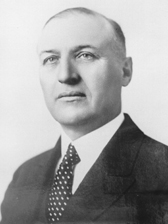
Nominee	William H. Dieterich	Otis F. Glenn
Party	Democratic	Republican
Popular vote	1,670,466	1,471,841
Percentage	52.23%	46.02%
- County results Dieterich: 40–50% 50–60% 60–70% 70–80% Glenn: 40–50% 50–60% 60–70% 70–80%
U.S. senator before election
Otis F. Glenn
Republican
Elected U.S. senator
William H. Dieterich
Democratic

The 1932 United States Senate election in Illinois took place on November 8, 1932. Incumbent Republican Otis F. Glenn was unseated by Democrat William H. Dieterich.

== Background ==
The primaries and general election coincided with those for federal elections (president and House) and those for state elections. Primaries were held April 12, 1932.

The economic downturn that was the Great Depression was raging through the nation since the 1929 Wall Street crash. Many voters laid blame for the downturn and its impacts on Republican president Herbert Hoover.

The 1930 election for Illinois' other U.S. Senate seat saw the first instance after the Seventeenth Amendment to the United States Constitution (adopted in 1912) went into effect (instituting popular elections for U.S. senate) that a Republican lost a U.S. Senate race in Illinois, with Democrat J. Hamilton Lewis winning that election.

== Democratic primary ==
=== Candidates ===
- Thomas A. Cummings
- William H. Dieterich, U.S. representative at-large
- Clarence H. Kavanaugh
- Emmet Kennedy
- Scott W. Lucas, former Mason County state's attorney
- John B. Monroe
- Thomas F. O'Donnell
- Edward Sullivan
- William Young

=== Results ===
Democratic primary
Party	Candidate	Votes	%
Democratic	William H. Dieterich	342,360	51.04
Democratic	Scott W. Lucas	144,028	21.47
Democratic	Clarence H. Kavanaugh	38,055	5.67
Democratic	Thomas F. O'Donnell	34,330	5.12
Democratic	Edward Sullivan	33,242	4.96
Democratic	John B. Monroe	21,411	3.19
Democratic	Emmet Kennedy	20,677	3.08
Democratic	William Young	20,462	3.05
Democratic	Thomas A. Cummings	16,213	2.42
Total votes		670,778	100

== Republican primary ==
=== Candidates ===
- Otis F. Glenn, incumbent U.S. senator since 1928
- Newton Jenkins, perennial candidate
- T. B. Wright

=== Results ===
Republican primary
Party	Candidate	Votes	%
Republican	Otis F. Glenn (incumbent)	572,382	53.62
Republican	Newton Jenkins	405,387	37.98
Republican	T.B. Wright	89,677	8.40
Total votes		1,067,446	100

== General election ==
=== Candidates ===
- William J. Baker (Independent)
- William E. Browder (Communist)
- William H. Dieterich, U.S. representative at-large (Democratic)
- Otis F. Glenn, incumbent U.S. senator since 1928 (Republican)
- G. A. Jenning (Socialist Labor)
- Charles Pogorelec (Socialist)

=== Results ===
1932 United States Senate election in Illinois
Party	Candidate	Votes	%
Democratic	William H. Dieterich	1,670,466	52.23%
Republican	Otis F. Glenn (incumbent)	1,471,841	46.02%
Socialist	Charles Pogorelec	37,922	1.19%
Communist	William E. Browder	13,318	0.42%
Socialist Labor	G. A. Jenning	3,379	0.11%
Independent	William J. Baker	1,209	0.04%
None	Scattering	16	0.00%
Majority		198,625	6.21%
Turnout		3,198,151	
Democratic gain from Republican			

== See also ==
- 1932 United States Senate elections
