= 1922 United States Senate election in Wisconsin =

- November 7, 1922
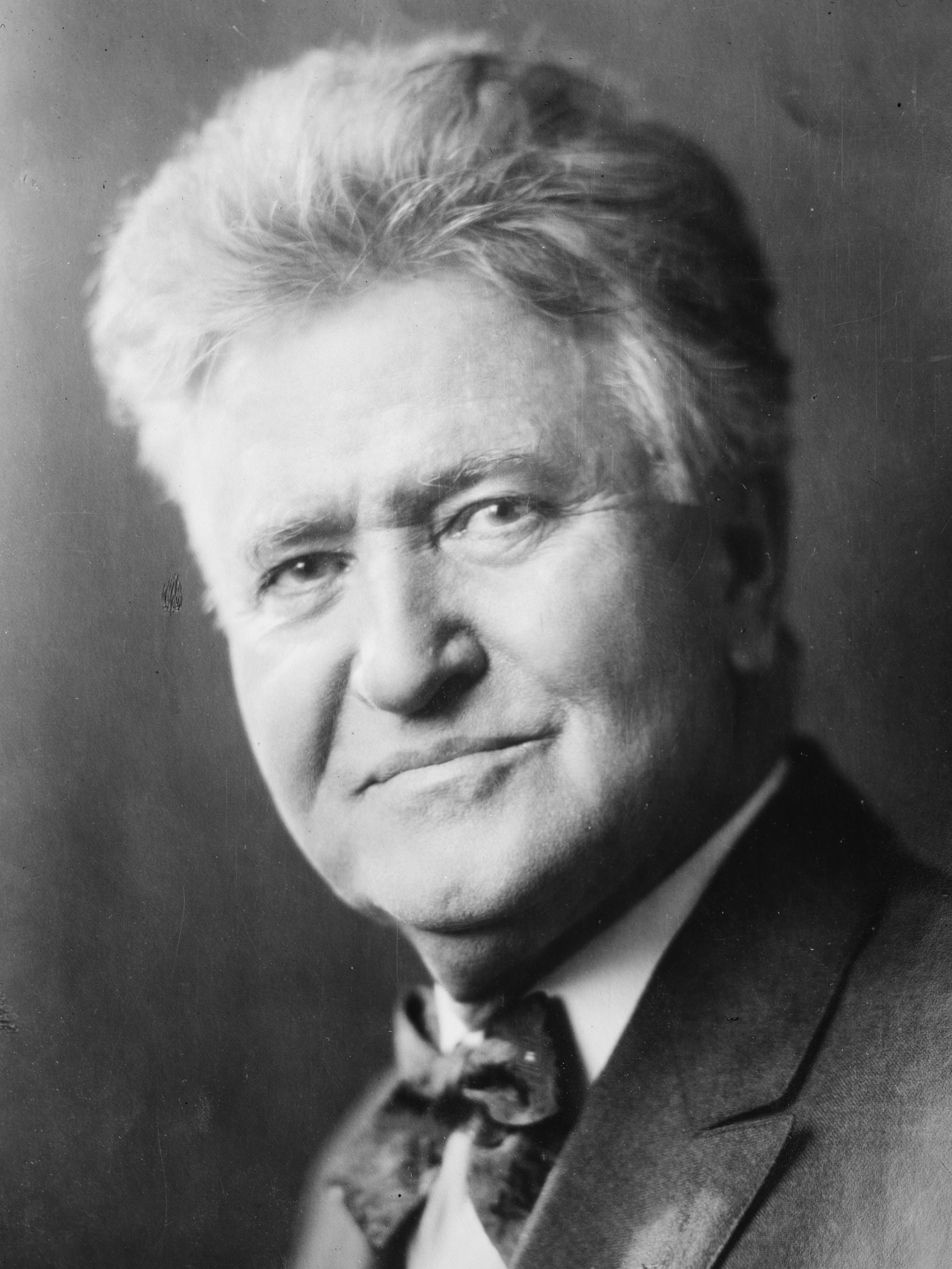

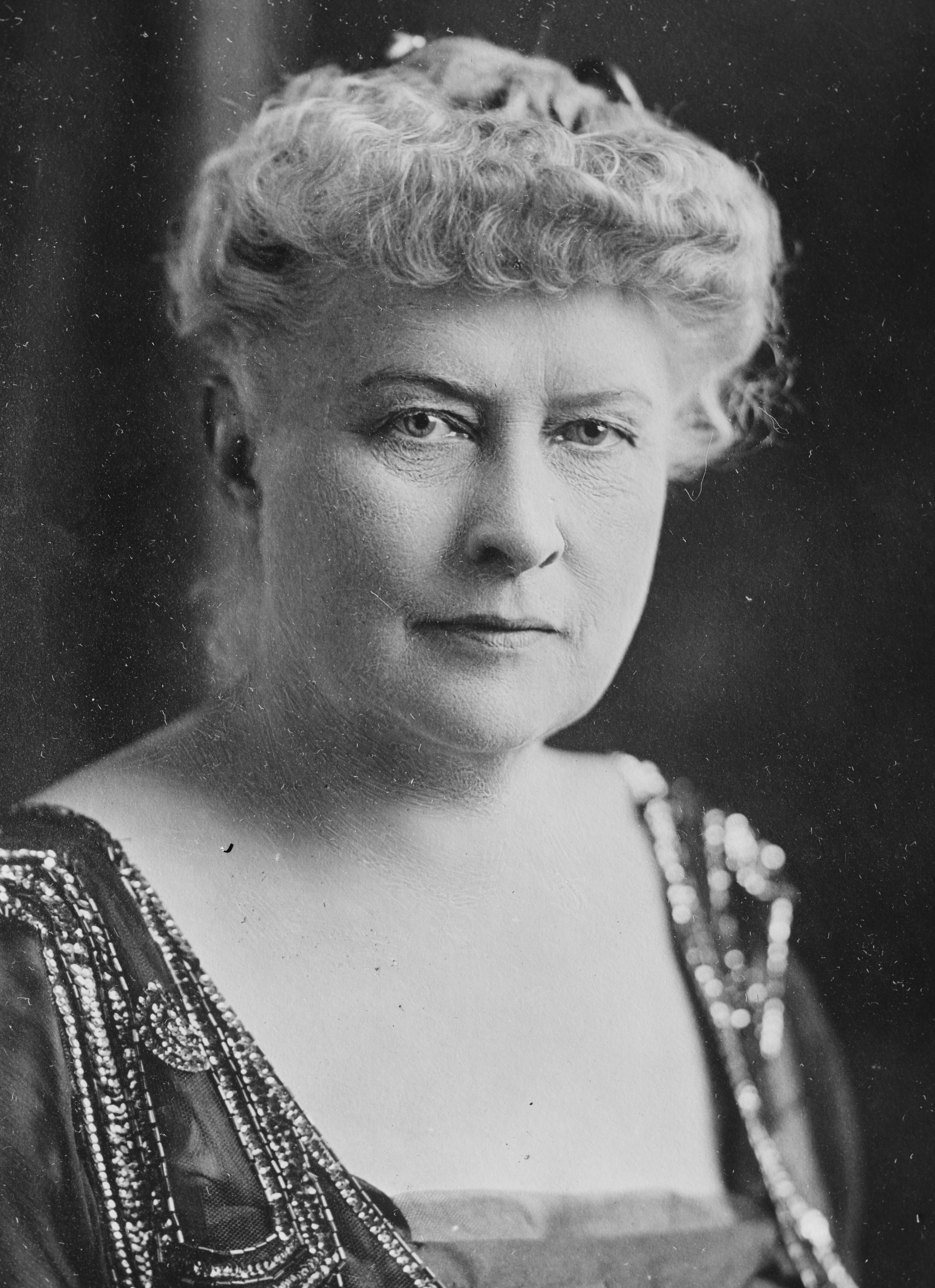
Nominee	Robert M. La Follette	Jessie Jack Hooper
Party	Republican	Democratic
Popular vote	379,494	78,029
Percentage	80.60%	16.57%
- County results La Follette: 60–70% 70–80% 80–90% >90%
U.S. senator before election
Robert M. La Follette
Republican
Elected U.S. Senator
Robert M. La Follette
Republican

The 1922 United States Senate election in Wisconsin was held on November 7, 1922.

Incumbent Republican U.S. Senator Robert M. La Follette was re-elected to a fourth term in office over Democrat Jessie Jack Hooper. Off the strength of his landslide victory, La Follette launched a second campaign for President of the United States in 1924.

La Follette's opponent, the suffragette Jessie Jack Hooper, was among the first American women to ever run a campaign for the U.S. Senate.

== Republican primary ==
=== Candidates ===
- William Arthur Ganfield, minister and president of Carroll College since 1921
- Robert M. La Follette, incumbent Senator since 1906

=== Campaign ===
La Follette spent much of the primary defending his opposition to American involvement in World War I and the Treaty of Versailles. He attacked President Warren Harding's administration and its proposed Four-Power Treaty as equally objectionable as the Versailles negotiations.

=== Results ===
1922 Republican U.S. Senate primary
Party	Candidate	Votes	%
Republican	Robert M. La Follette (incumbent)	362,445	72.23%
Republican	William Arthur Ganfield	139,327	27.77%
Total votes		484,135	100.00%

== Democratic primary ==
=== Candidates ===
- Jessie Jack Hooper, suffragette and anti-war activist

=== Results ===
1922 Democratic U.S. Senate primary
Party	Candidate	Votes	%
Democratic	Jessie Jack Hooper	16,663	100
Total votes		16,663	100

== Prohibition primary ==
=== Candidates ===
- Adolph R. Bucknam

=== Results ===
1922 Prohibition U.S. Senate primary
Party	Candidate	Votes	%
Prohibition	Adolph R. Bucknam	1,282	100.00%
Total votes		1,282	100.00%

== General election ==
=== Candidates ===
- Adolph R. Bucknam (Prohibition)
- Jessie Jack Hooper, suffragette and anti-war activist (Democratic)
- Robert M. La Follette, incumbent Senator since 1906 (Republican)
- Richard Koeppel (Socialist Labor)

=== Campaign ===
Hooper's campaign was run by two women, Livia Peshkova and Gertrude Watkins, bolstered by women in the press, and often hosted in family living rooms. The campaign rallying cry was "Whoop for Hooper." Her election platform championed the League of Nations, veterans compensation, and world peace. Her husband was one of only two men who donated any money to her campaign.

=== Results ===
1922 U.S. Senate election in Wisconsin
Party	Candidate	Votes	%	±%
Republican	Robert M. La Follette (incumbent)	379,494	80.60%	▲21.37
Democratic	Jessie Jack Hooper	78,029	16.57%	▼15.33
Prohibition	Adolph R. Bucknam	11,254	2.39%	▲0.37
Socialist Labor	Richard Koeppel	1,656	0.35%	▲0.18
Write-in		386	0.08%	
Total votes		470,819	100.00%	
Republican hold				

== See also ==
- 1922 United States Senate elections
