= Union Party (United States) =

- Leaders: William Lemke, Francis Townsend, Charles Coughlin, Gerald L. K. Smith
- Founded: 1935; 91 years ago
- Dissolved: 1936; 90 years ago
- Ideology: Populism; Distributism; Non-interventionism; Factions: Antisemitism (Coughlin)
- Political position: Economic: Left-wing; Social: Far-right (factions)

The Union Party was a short-lived political party in the United States, formed in 1935 by a coalition of radio priest Father Charles Coughlin, old-age pension advocate Francis Townsend, and Gerald L. K. Smith, who had taken control of Huey Long's Share Our Wealth (SOW) movement after Long's assassination in 1935. Each of those people hoped to channel their wide followings into support for the Union Party, which proposed a populist alternative to the New Deal reforms of Franklin D. Roosevelt during the Great Depression.

The party nominated a ticket consisting of Republican Congressman William Lemke and labor attorney Thomas C. O'Brien in the 1936 presidential election. Running against Republican nominee Alf Landon, Roosevelt won a second term with over 60% of the popular vote, while Lemke won just under 2% of the popular vote. The Union Party collapsed after the 1936 elections. Lemke served as a Republican Congressman until his death in 1950, while Coughlin and Townsend receded from national politics. Smith later founded the Christian Nationalist Crusade and became a prominent proponent of Holocaust denial.

== History ==
=== Background ===
Many observers at the time felt that there was a place for a party more radical than Roosevelt and the Democrats but still non-Marxist in the political spectrum of the time.

Newton Jenkins's campaign in the 1935 Chicago mayoral election acted as an informal test-run for the fledgling movement behind the Union Party.

=== Rumored political aspirations of Huey Long ===
Although many people expected Huey Long, the colorful Democratic senator from Louisiana, to run as a third-party candidate with his "Share Our Wealth" program as his platform, his bid was cut short when he was assassinated in September 1935.

Prior to Long's death, leading contenders for the role of the sacrificial 1936 candidate included Senators Burton K. Wheeler (D-Montana) and William E. Borah (R-Idaho), and Governor Floyd B. Olson (FL-Minnesota). After the assassination, however, the two senators lost interest in the idea (Borah ran as a Republican, garnering only a few delegates and losing the nomination to Kansas governor Alf Landon) and Olson was diagnosed with terminal stomach cancer.

=== Problems and controversies ===
The Union Party suffered from a multiplicity of problems almost from the moment of its inception. A primary one was that each of the party's three principal leaders seemingly saw himself, not its presidential nominee William Lemke, as the real power figure and natural leader of the party. His charisma attracted more people than did the other candidates. Another was that each man's movement was largely held together by personality more than a truly cohesive ideology: in the case of Coughlin and Townsend their own personalities; in the case of Smith, the memory of the late Huey Long's charismatic personality. Smith himself was considered a far less charismatic figure. Some critics charged that the Union Party was in fact controlled by Father Coughlin, a former Roosevelt supporter who had broken with Roosevelt and by 1936 had become an antisemite. Smith had also turned to antisemitism, which was not consistent with the views of Long, Townsend, and Lemke, and reduced the appeal of the group among many progressives. Such as the Minnesota Farmer–Labor Party, Farmer-Labor Association of Minnesota, Wisconsin Progressive Party and the Farmer-Labor Progressive Federation.

The Union Party attracted modest support from populists on both sides of the political spectrum who were unhappy with Roosevelt and from the remnants of earlier third parties such as the Farmer-Labor Party. Others such as The Nation magazine were wary of the new party and backed Roosevelt. Presaging more recent debates over the Reform Party, the Green Party, H. Ross Perot, and Ralph Nader, some falsely considered the party either a left-wing spoiler party which would hurt Roosevelt, or an unprecedented alliance between left-wing and right-wing populists. In fact, supporters of the Union Party were both socially conservative isolationists from the Republican Party and economically left-wing farmers and workers who were disappointed with Roosevelt's "betrayal" of his promises. Members of the Union Party frequently claimed Roosevelt had been "bought" by the bankers and the Federal Reserve.

=== Demise ===
The Union Party was disbanded shortly after the 1936 elections. Presidential nominee Lemke continued to serve in Congress as a Republican, and died in office while serving an eighth term. Father Coughlin announced his retirement from the airwaves immediately after the disappointing returns of the 1936 election, but returned to the air within a couple of months; upon U.S. entry into World War II, the Roman Catholic Church ordered Father Coughlin to retire from the airwaves and return to his duties as a parish priest, and he died in obscurity in 1979. Townsend, already quite elderly, saw his movement largely supplanted by the enactment of Social Security the next year and also largely became quite obscure afterwards, although he lived until 1960. Smith became even more of a radical fringe figure who eventually became an early proponent of Holocaust denial. He died in 1976.

== 1936 presidential nominee ==
William Lemke, a U.S. Congressman from North Dakota, was chosen as the party's nominee for the 1936 presidential election.

The vice-presidential nominee was Thomas C. O'Brien, a labor lawyer from Boston.

Year	Presidential nominee	Vice-Presidential nominee	Votes	Percent
1936	William Lemke	Thomas C. O'Brien	892,378	1.95%

== Other notable candidates ==
Jacob S. Coxey of Coxey's Army fame, socialist leader and frequent independent candidate for the United States Congress, ran for Congress in 1936 on the Union Party ticket in Ohio's 16th District. He received 2,384 votes or 1.6% of the vote (4th place).

== Other namesakes ==
In the 1864 presidential election, the Republican Party of incumbent President Abraham Lincoln ran as the "National Union Party" or "Union Party". The name was a reference to the Union faction of the American Civil War. Coughlin took the Union label for his own party, comparing the "financial slavery" of the 1930s to the "physical slavery" of the 1860s.

In the 1980 presidential election, John B. Anderson's independent bid for the presidency against Ronald Reagan and Jimmy Carter was in many states run on the party ballot line of the "National Union Party". Anderson won 6.6% of the popular vote and no electoral votes.
