= William Michael McKinley =

American politician (1879–1965)

William McKinley
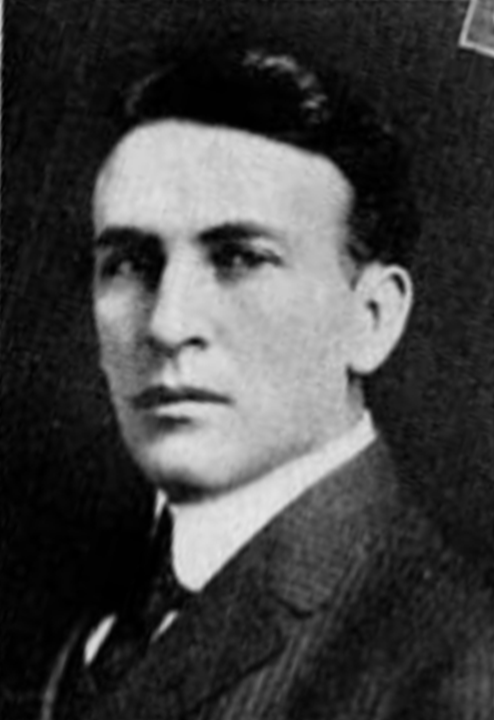

44th Speaker of the Illinois House of Representatives
- In office January 29, 1913 – January 6, 1915
- Preceded by: Charles Adkins
- Succeeded by: David Shanahan

Personal details
- Born: William Michael McKinley; June 1, 1879 Postville, Iowa
- Died: August 12, 1965 (aged 86) Glenview, Illinois
- Party: Democratic
- Spouse: Katherine Elizabeth Riley
- Education: Iowa State Normal School (BA); Chicago-Kent College of Law (LL.B.)

William Michael McKinley (June 1, 1879 – August 12, 1964) was an American lawyer and politician who served as a Democratic member of the Illinois House of Representatives. He was the Speaker of the Illinois House from January 29, 1913, to January 8, 1915.

== Early life ==
Born in Postville, Iowa, McKinley went to the University of Northern Iowa. After completing those studies, he was a school principal in Ashton, Iowa, and Castalia, Iowa. He moved to Chicago to study law at Chicago-Kent College of Law. He received his LL.B. in 1907. He managed the congressional campaign of Richard J. Finnegan. He practiced law in Chicago and was a law partner of Barratt O'Hara, who would go on to be elected Lieutenant Governor of Illinois the same year that McKinley was elected to the House, at McKinley & O'Hara. He became engaged to Katherine Elizabeth Riley with whom he was engaged prior to his time in the legislature. They eventually married and remained such until her death in 1962.

== Legislative career ==
In the 1912 election, he was elected to the Illinois House of Representatives as one of three representatives from the 21st district alongside Harry L. Shaver and Franklin S. Catlan. That election cycle, the Democratic Party held a plurality of 71 members in the chamber with the Republicans at 52 members, the Progressives at 27, and the Socialists at 3 members. Each ran its own candidate. McKinley was proposed by Roger Charles Sullivan as a compromise candidate among several Democratic factions. He was elected Speaker and took the post on January 29, 1913. He was elected by a combination of Democrats, Republicans, and Progressive.

As speaker, McKinley played a key role in the passage of the law granting Illinois women municipal and presidential suffrage, which was enacted on June 26, 1913. After being lobbied by both proponents and opponents of the cause, McKinley moved the bill to a legislative vote, the first time such a bill had gone to vote in the state legislature. According to the Rockford Republican, "McKinley's fiancée had refused to formalize their engagement until the suffrage bill passed." The act made Illinois the first state east of the Mississippi River to give women the right to vote for President.

== Post-legislative career ==
In 1914, McKinley ran for judge. After his single term in office, he maintained his law practice and was a financial supporter of Blackburn College. McKinley died August 12, 1964, in Glenview, Illinois, where he had resided for the two prior years.
