= Jessie Jack Hooper =

American peace activist and suffragist

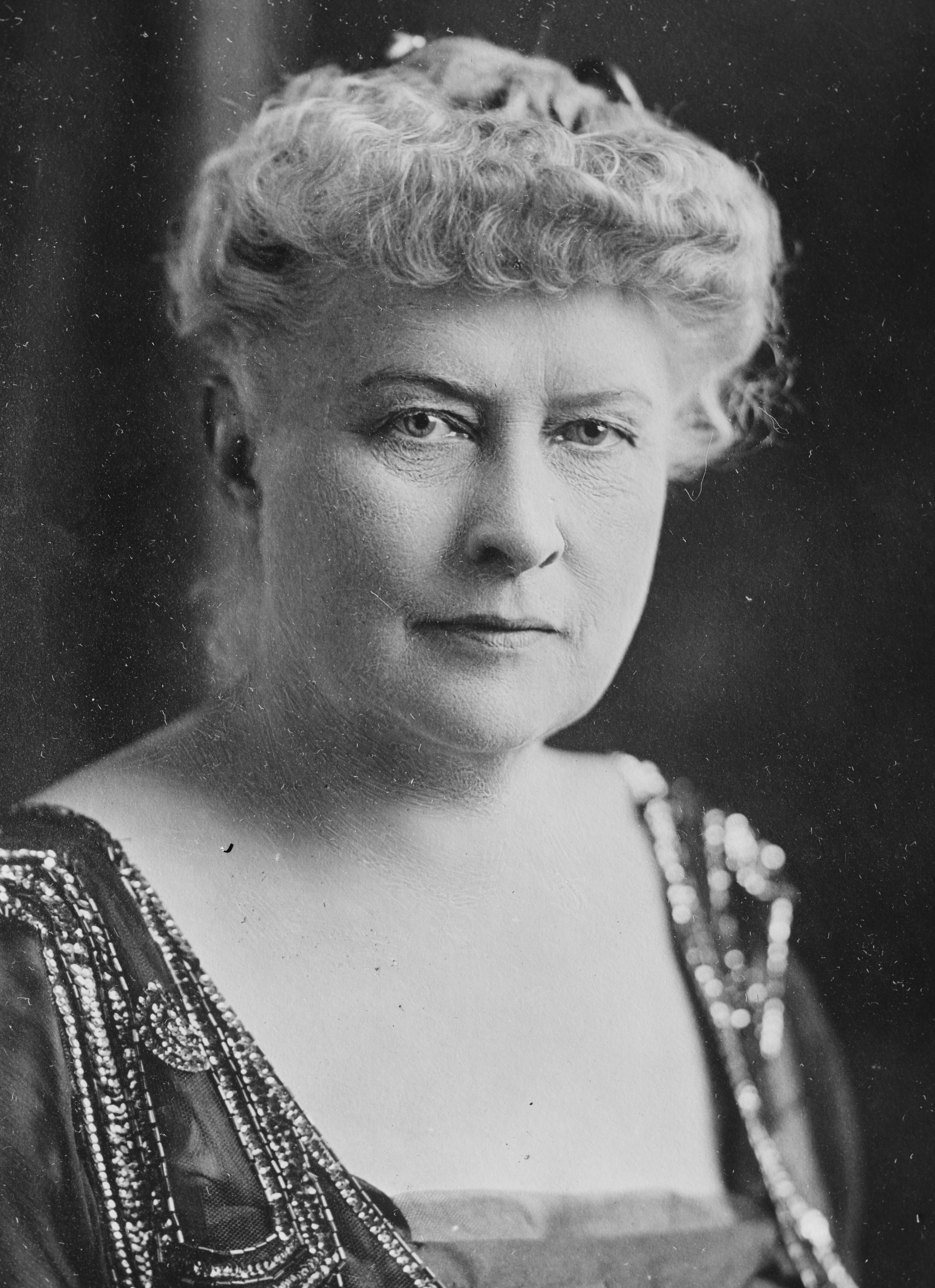
- Hooper c. 1900
- Born: November 9, 1865; Winneshiek County, Iowa, US
- Died: May 7, 1935 (aged 69); Oshkosh, Wisconsin, US
- Known for: Suffragist; Politician; Peace activist; First president of the Wisconsin League of Women Voters
- Spouse: Ben Hooper
- Relatives: Lois Van Valkenburgh (granddaughter)

Jessie Annette Jack Hooper (November 9, 1865 – May 7, 1935) was an American peace activist and suffragist, who was the first president of the Wisconsin League of Women Voters. She became involved in women's suffrage as an empowerment for women's civic clubs. In 1922, she ran against incumbent Robert M. La Follette for election to the United States Senate, a campaign which inspired her to organize women's groups to call for world disarmament.

== Early life ==
She was born November 9, 1865, in Winneshiek County, Iowa to wealthy businessman David Jack, and tutored by a governess. In later life, she would recall her father's fortitude during a business financial crisis, "If ever I feel discouraged, my father's indomitable qualities come to mind and shame me."

== Women's suffrage ==
In 1888, she married Oshkosh, Wisconsin attorney Ben Hooper, who encouraged her civic interests. When Hooper and her young daughter attended the World's Congress of Representative Women, held as part of the Chicago World's Fair in 1893, they listened to a speech by Susan B. Anthony. It was not until 1908 that Hooper held an elected position with any civic organization, and even then attempted to shy away from the responsibility when her husband encouraged her nomination to fill a vacancy within the local chapter of the Daughters of the American Revolution. In spite of her reluctance, she won the election handily and subsequently held many positions in what were considered "women's clubs" of the day. Her earliest efforts were concentrated on improving healthcare options and facilities where none existed. She found such endeavors to be uphill efforts, with men becoming involved only after her efforts saw success.

We found men in charge of our city government, while always polite to us, had little interest in what we wanted because we had no votes. I soon got tired of joining pilgrimages to officials where we rarely got what we asked for, and decided to concentrate my efforts on securing the vote for women.

She began pursuing suffragist goals in earnest, spending time in Washington D.C., where she shared housing with nationally known suffragists. At the behest of National American Women's Suffrage Association (NAWSA) president Carrie Chapman Catt, Hooper and Minnie Fisher Cunningham toured Arizona, Nevada, New Mexico and Utah in 1919 and 1920 pressuring governors to call a special session to ratify the Nineteenth Amendment to the United States Constitution. After ratification of the Amendment in 1920, NAWSA became the League of Women Voters. In Wisconsin the league's chapter carried the maxim "every woman an intelligent voter", and Hooper served two terms as its first president.

== U.S. Senate campaign ==
The state Democratic Party nominated Hooper in 1922 to run for the United States Senate against the Republican incumbent Robert M. La Follette Sr. Her campaign was run by two women, Livia Peshkova and Gertrude Watkins, bolstered by women in the press, and often hosted in family living rooms. The campaign rallying cry became "Whoop for Hooper." Her election platform championed the League of Nations, veterans compensation, and world peace. By this point in time, she was a grandmother and paid secretary and partner in her husband's business. He was one of only two men who donated any money to her campaign.

== Peace activist ==
Hooper's efforts for world peace had begun to surface in her women's clubs speeches with the onset of World War I, when she expressed a firm resolve to end all wars. Although she lost the 1922 election 78,029 votes to La Follette's 279,484 votes, the experience spurred her determination to recruit women for peace activism. Hooper invited 115 women nationwide to a 1924 brainstorming session, which eventually created the Conference on the Cause and Cure of War, a group that subsequently convened for several years. Elected to head the Department of International Relations of Women's Clubs, and the Wisconsin League of Women Voters' Committee for International Cooperation to Prevent War, she approached with zeal an effort to gather a million signatures for military disarmament. She took the cause of peace on the road, speaking to audiences across the country and on the radio, and writing newspaper columns. The effort fell short, with 635,300 signatures gathered. Hooper was selected in 1932 to present the aggregate petitions to the World Disarmament Conference in Geneva, Switzerland.

== Death and legacy ==
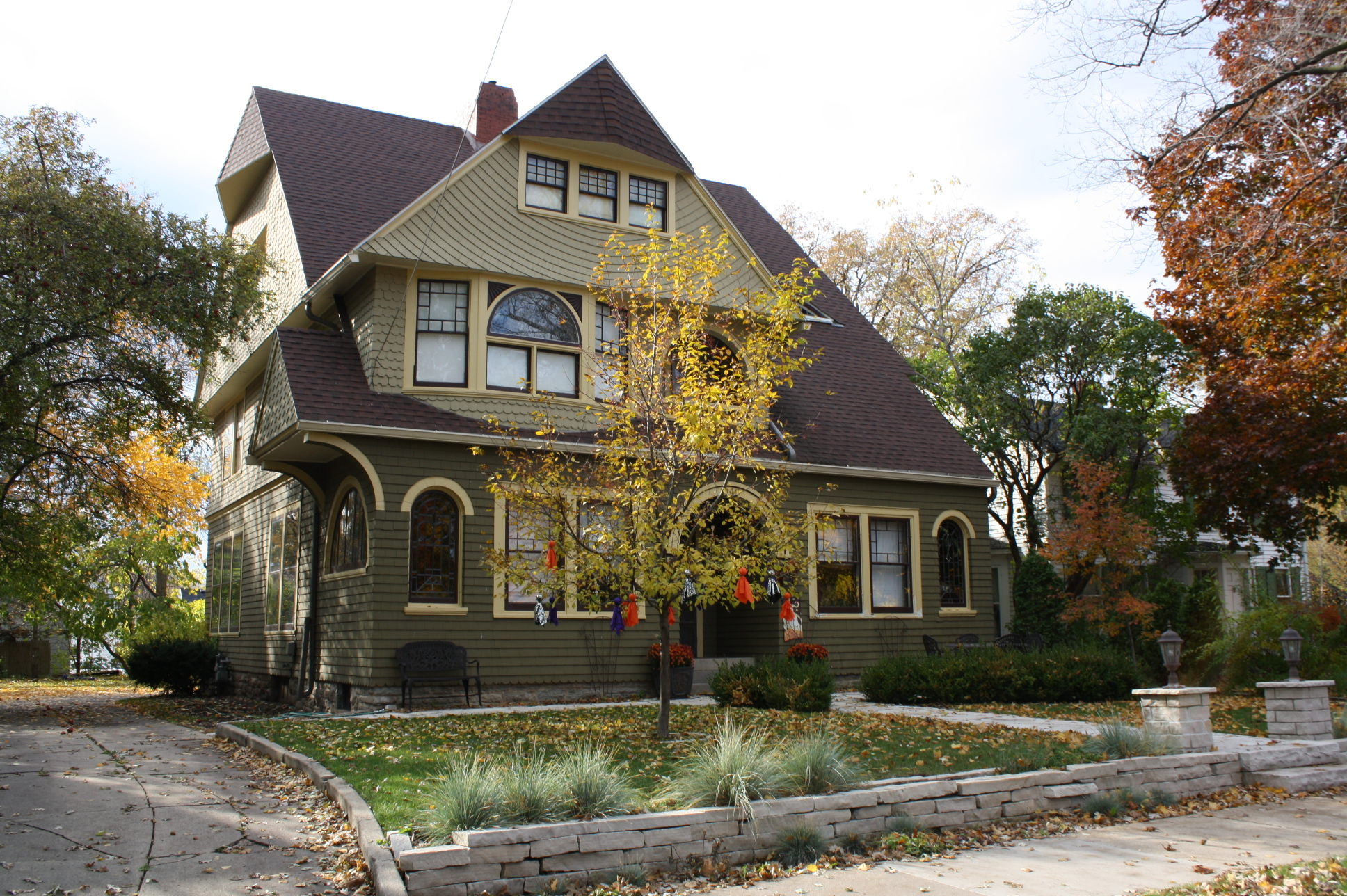
The Jessie Jack Hooper House

Hooper continued to work for peace after her return from Switzerland. In 1934 she was hospitalized, and returned home to live an only a few more months. On May 7, 1935, Hooper died.

The Jessie Jack Hooper House in Oshkosh, Wisconsin was listed on the National Register of Historic Places in 1978.

Her granddaughter was civil rights activist Lois Van Valkenburgh.

Party political offices
Preceded by William F. Wolfe	Democratic nominee for U.S. Senator from Wisconsin (Class 1); 1922	Succeeded by William G. Bruce
