= James Medcalf =

English footballer

Personal information
- Full name: James Thomas Medcalf
- Date of birth: 2 May 1895
- Place of birth: Scarborough, England
- Date of death: 1980 (aged 84–85)
- Place of death: Hull, England
- Position(s): Winger

Senior career*
Years	Team	Apps	(Gls)
1914	Hull City	2	(0)
- *Club domestic league appearances and goals

James Thomas Medcalf (2 May 1895 – 1980) was an English footballer who played as a winger in the Football League for Hull City.

== Personal life ==
At the time he appeared for Hull City, Medcalf worked in a sawmill. He served as a private in the King's Own Yorkshire Light Infantry during the First World War and was invalided out of the army in 1918. After the war, he worked as a wool machinist in Hull.

== Career statistics ==
Appearances and goals by club, season and competition
Club	Season	Division	League		FA Cup		Total	
Club	Season	Division	Apps	Goals	Apps	Goals	Apps	Goals
Hull City	1914–15	Second Division	2	0	0	0	2	0
Career total			2	0	0	0	2	0
