= James J. Metcalfe =

American writer

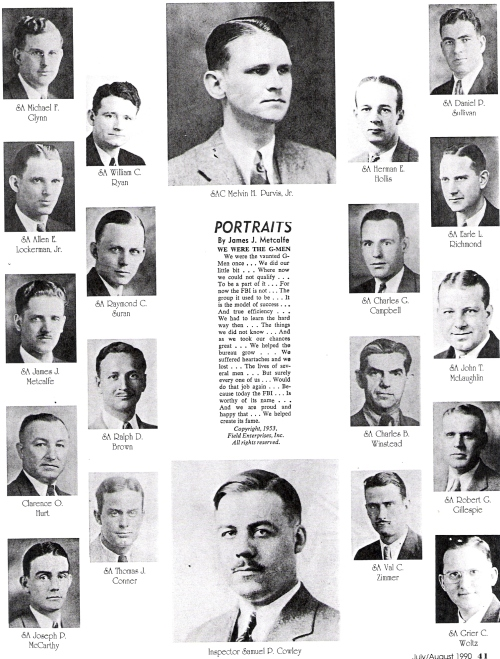
James J. Metcalfe, in a collage of FBI Special Agents from 1934. His poem, "We Were the G-Men," may be seen at center. Metcalf is at center in the far left column.

James J. Metcalfe (September 16, 1906 – March 19, 1960) was an American poet whose "Daily Poem Portraits" were published in more than 100 United States newspapers during the 1940s and 1950s. Prior to his literary career, he served as a Special Agent for the FBI, where he aided in the ambush of gangster John Dillinger, and also as a reporter for the Chicago Daily Times newspaper.

== Early life and FBI Career ==
Metcalfe was born in Berlin, Germany and emigrated to the United States as a boy. His mother was a concert pianist, He was educated at Notre Dame, and obtained a law degree from Loyola University. Soon after completing law school, Metcalfe joined the FBI's Chicago Bureau, where he participated in operations against several Midwestern gangsters, including Ma Barker, Pretty Boy Floyd, and John Dillinger. Metcalfe was among the agents who ambushed Dillinger outside the Biograph Theater in Chicago, resulting in Dillinger's death.

In later years, after achieving fame as a nationally syndicated poet, Metcalfe wrote a poem in tribute to those who served with him during the FBI's early years, entitled "We Were the G-Men:

We were the vaunted G-men once ... we did our little bit.
Where now, we could not qualify ... to be a part of it.
...
For now the FBI is not the group it used to be ...
It is the model of success and of true efficiency.
...
We had to learn the hard way then the things we did not know ...
And as we took our chances great, we helped the Bureau grow.
...
We suffered heartaches and we lost the lives of several men,
But surely every one of us would do that job again.
...
Because today the FBI is worthy of its name ...
And we are proud and happy that we helped create its fame.

== Newspaper reporter ==
After leaving the FBI, Metcalfe joined the staff of the Chicago Daily Times as a reporter. He was assigned to infiltrate the German American Bund, with a view to exposing its activities to the public. His stories on the Bund helped to lead to the formation of a Congressional committee to investigate Nazi activity in America, and later won him and two other reporters, one being his brother, John C. Metcalfe, and the other, William Mueller, the National Headliners Club's Medal of Honor for the Best Story of 1937.

== Poet ==
During the 1940s, Metcalfe returned to a favorite childhood pastime: writing poetry. Metcalfe wrote hundreds of short poems about the human condition that appealed to people across a vast spectrum of careers and backgrounds. His first book of poetry, entitled "Portraits", contained 750 poems; he later published at least sixteen other titles. Metcalfe mused about love, friendship, life, religion, time, old age, youth, candy, vacations, holidays, envy and numerous other subjects. His poetry also appeared in Hallmark greeting cards.

Metcalfe indicated that he started writing poetry as a teenager, when he "used to fall in love with all the girls and write poems to them to win them over. It didn't always work, but it was worth trying." In later years, in the dedication of one of his books of poetry, he promised his readers that he "will not touch my pen, except it be in prayer to God, or praise of my fellowmen."

Metcalfe wrote and published at least seventeen books of poetry:

- Portraits (1947)
- Poem Portraits: A Collection of Verse (1948)
- Poem Portraits: 107 Selected Poems (1948)
- Garden in My Heart: Poem Flowers of Faith and Friendship (1949)
- Poems For Children (1950)
- James J. Metcalfe's Portraits: 100 Selected Poems (1950)
- More Poem Portraits: A Further Collection of Verse (1951)
- My Rosary of Rhymes: Poetic Beads of Faith and Friendship (1952)
- Love Portraits (1953)
- Love Portraits (1954)
- Portraits: 100 More Selected Poems (1954)
- Daily Poem Portraits (1954)
- Garden in My Heart (1955)
- Portraits: 100 Selected Poems (1956)
- Poem Portraits of the Saints (1956)
- Poem Portraits of Inspiration (1958)
- Poem Portraits for All Occasions (1961)

== A representative Metcalfe poem ==
One of Metcalfe's poems is about "The Friends I Had":

I used to have some special friends
I do not have today
And many times I wonder why
We had to drift away.
...
I wrote them letters now and then
And some of them replied,
Yet gradually and casually
The correspondence died.
...
But every time I think of them
And hold them in my heart,
I wonder why they do not write
And why we had to part.

== Family and later life ==
Metcalfe and his wife Lillian Hammer Metcalfe had 3 children: Donald, James, and Kristina Marie. The Metcalfe family lived in Chicago, Dallas, and California. In his later years, Metcalfe delighted in retelling, not merely the poems for which he had become famous, but also stories of his FBI and reporter days, including his experiences with several notorious American mobsters. The Metcalfes lived for several years in a modest ranch house in Dallas, which Metcalfe referred to as "the house that poems built."

Metcalfe died in March 1960, at the age of 53.
