= Virginia Department of Behavioral Health and Developmental Services =

American state agency

The Virginia Department of Behavioral Health and Developmental Services (DBHDS) is a state agency of the Commonwealth of Virginia. The department operates Virginia's public mental health, intellectual disability, and substance abuse services system through a system of forty locally and regionally run community services boards (CSBs) and twelve state-operated facilities which serve children and adults who have or who are at risk of mental illness, serious emotional disturbance, intellectual disability, or substance use disorders.

Of the twelve state-run facilities, nine are behavioral health facilities, one is a training center to serve individuals with intellectual and developmental disability, one is a medical center, and one is a center for behavioral rehabilitation (SVP). For placement in state facilities, patients are initially evaluated and referred from local CSBs.

== Recent lawsuits ==
A lawsuit, filed the week of December 8, 2007, by the Virginia Office for Protection and Advocacy requested the release of information about alleged abuses at two state facilities operated by DMHMRSAS.

Reading from a prepared statement, on December 7, 2007, Colleen Miller, director of the Virginia Office for Protection and Advocacy, expressed concerns about the deaths, saying, "If the allegations we have received are true, people with disabilities in state care may be at grave risk of harm and death."
