= List of United States senators from Illinois =

Current delegation

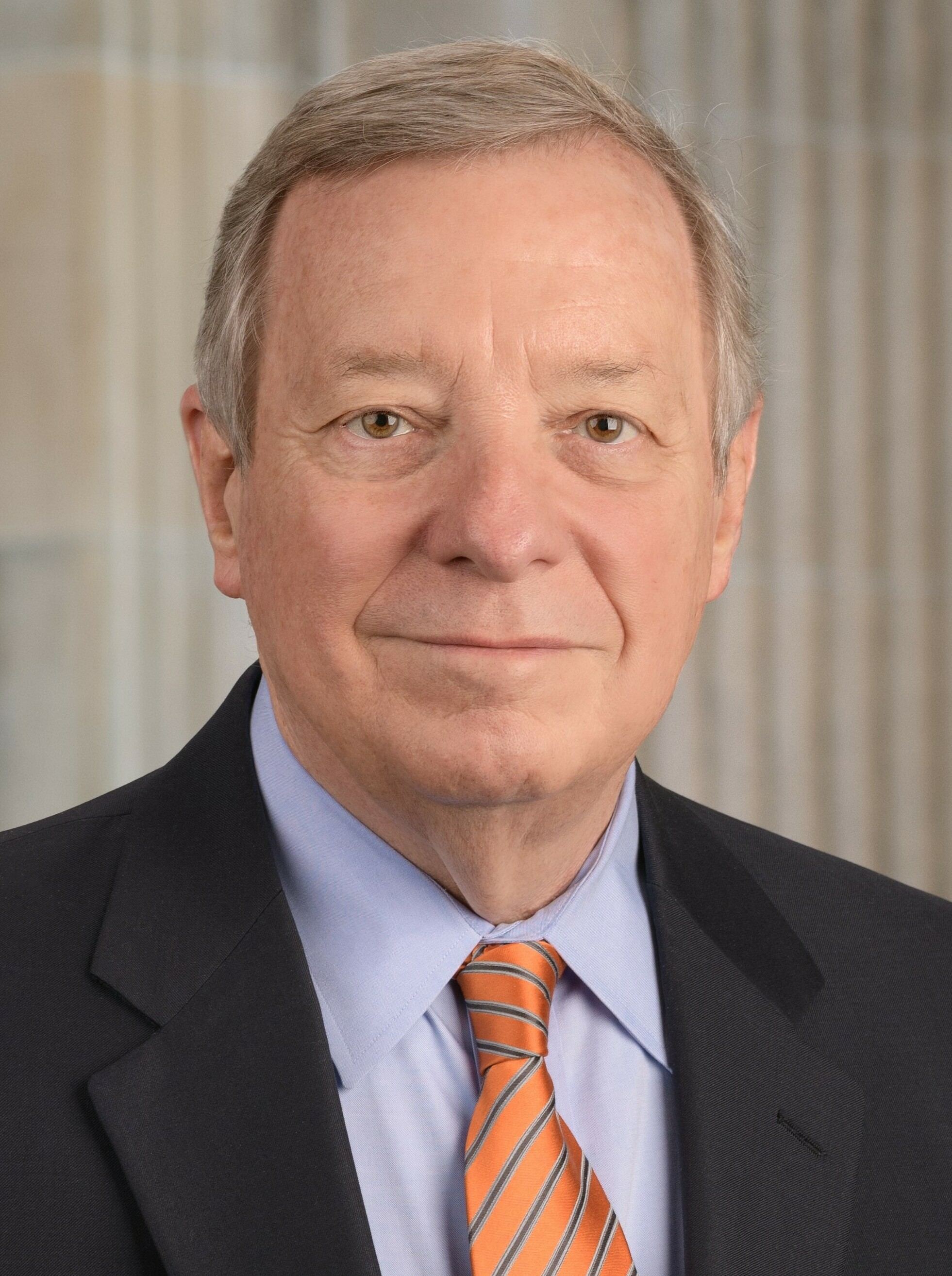
Dick Durbin (D)

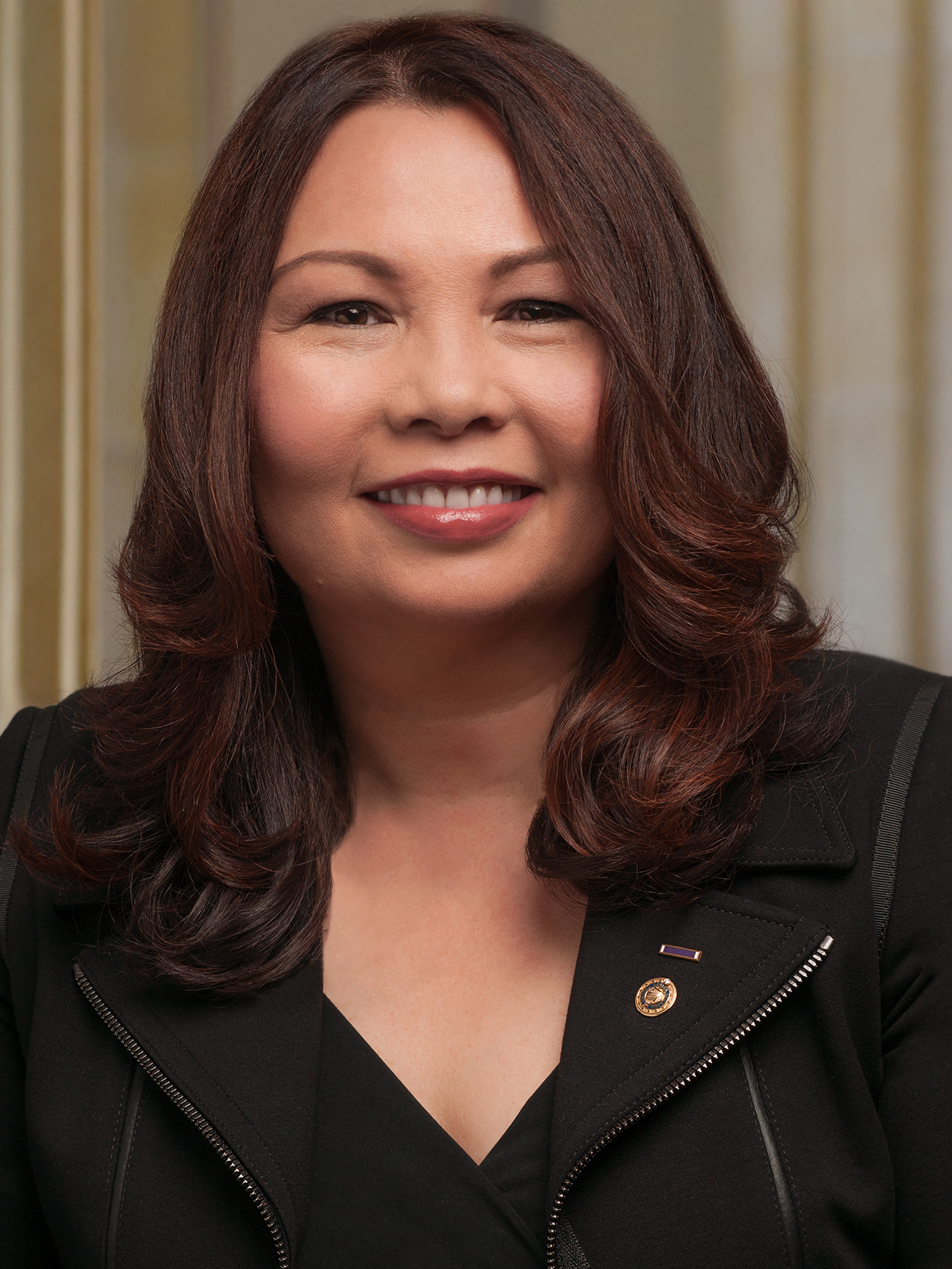
Tammy Duckworth (D)

(ordered by seniority)

Illinois was admitted to the Union on December 3, 1818, and has been represented in the United States Senate by 47 senators. Senators from Illinois are elected to class 2 and class 3.

The Senate twice refused to seat Frank L. Smith, in December 1926 for an appointed term and in March 1927 for an elected one, due to corruption, but he is included in this list because Smith and the Governor considered him to be a senator for approximately two years.

Of the twelve African Americans ever to sit in the U.S. Senate since Reconstruction, three have held Illinois's class 3 seat, including Barack Obama who went on to become the president of the United States. This makes Illinois the state with the most African-American senators. Illinois's current U.S. senators are Democrats Dick Durbin (serving since 1997) and Tammy Duckworth (serving since 2017). Shelby Moore Cullom was the longest serving senator, who served from 1883 to 1913.

== List of senators ==
Class 2 Class 2 senators belong to the electoral cycle that most recently had regular elections in 2008, 2014, 2020, and 2026. The next election will be in 2032.						C	Class 3 Class 3 senators belong to the electoral cycle that most recently had regular elections in 2004, 2010, 2016, and 2022. The next election will be in 2028.					
#	Senator	Party	Dates in office	Electoral history	T	C	T	Electoral history	Dates in office	Party	Senator	#
1	Jesse B. Thomas (Edwardsville)	Democratic- Republican	Dec 3, 1818 – Mar 3, 1829	Elected in 1818.	1	15th	1	Elected in 1818.	Dec 3, 1818 – Mar 3, 1824	Democratic- Republican	Ninian Edwards (Edwardsville)	1
1	Jesse B. Thomas (Edwardsville)	Democratic- Republican	Dec 3, 1818 – Mar 3, 1829	Elected in 1818.	1	16th	2	Re-elected in 1819. Resigned.	Dec 3, 1818 – Mar 3, 1824	Democratic- Republican	Ninian Edwards (Edwardsville)	1
1	Jesse B. Thomas (Edwardsville)	Democratic- Republican	Dec 3, 1818 – Mar 3, 1829	Elected in 1818.	1	17th	2	Re-elected in 1819. Resigned.	Dec 3, 1818 – Mar 3, 1824	Democratic- Republican	Ninian Edwards (Edwardsville)	1
1	Jesse B. Thomas (Edwardsville)	Democratic- Republican	Dec 3, 1818 – Mar 3, 1829	Re-elected in 1823. Retired.	2	18th	2	Re-elected in 1819. Resigned.	Dec 3, 1818 – Mar 3, 1824	Democratic- Republican	Ninian Edwards (Edwardsville)	1
1	Jesse B. Thomas (Edwardsville)	Democratic- Republican	Dec 3, 1818 – Mar 3, 1829	Re-elected in 1823. Retired.	2	18th	2		Mar 4, 1824 – Nov 24, 1824	Vacant		
1	Jesse B. Thomas (Edwardsville)	Democratic- Republican	Dec 3, 1818 – Mar 3, 1829	Re-elected in 1823. Retired.	2	18th	2	Elected to finish Edwards's term. Retired.	Nov 24, 1824 – Mar 3, 1825	Democratic- Republican	John McLean (Shawneetown)	2
1	Jesse B. Thomas (Edwardsville)	National; Republican	Dec 3, 1818 – Mar 3, 1829	Re-elected in 1823. Retired.	2	19th	3	Elected in 1825.	Mar 4, 1825 – Dec 12, 1835	Jacksonian	Elias Kane (Kaskaskia)	3
1	Jesse B. Thomas (Edwardsville)	National; Republican	Dec 3, 1818 – Mar 3, 1829	Re-elected in 1823. Retired.	2	20th	3	Elected in 1825.	Mar 4, 1825 – Dec 12, 1835	Jacksonian	Elias Kane (Kaskaskia)	3
2	John McLean (Shawneetown)	Jacksonian	Mar 4, 1829 – Oct 14, 1830	Elected in 1829. Died.	3	21st	3	Elected in 1825.	Mar 4, 1825 – Dec 12, 1835	Jacksonian	Elias Kane (Kaskaskia)	3
Vacant			Oct 14, 1830 – Nov 12, 1830		3	21st	3	Elected in 1825.	Mar 4, 1825 – Dec 12, 1835	Jacksonian	Elias Kane (Kaskaskia)	3
3	David J. Baker (Shawneetown)	Jacksonian	Nov 12, 1830 – Dec 11, 1830	Appointed to continue McLean's term. Retired.	3	21st	3	Elected in 1825.	Mar 4, 1825 – Dec 12, 1835	Jacksonian	Elias Kane (Kaskaskia)	3
4	John M. Robinson (Carmi)	Jacksonian	Dec 11, 1830 – Mar 3, 1841	Elected to finish McLean's term.	3	21st	3	Elected in 1825.	Mar 4, 1825 – Dec 12, 1835	Jacksonian	Elias Kane (Kaskaskia)	3
4	John M. Robinson (Carmi)	Jacksonian	Dec 11, 1830 – Mar 3, 1841	Elected to finish McLean's term.	3	22nd	4	Re-elected in 1831. Died.	Mar 4, 1825 – Dec 12, 1835	Jacksonian	Elias Kane (Kaskaskia)	3
4	John M. Robinson (Carmi)	Jacksonian	Dec 11, 1830 – Mar 3, 1841	Elected to finish McLean's term.	3	23rd	4	Re-elected in 1831. Died.	Mar 4, 1825 – Dec 12, 1835	Jacksonian	Elias Kane (Kaskaskia)	3
4	John M. Robinson (Carmi)	Jacksonian	Dec 11, 1830 – Mar 3, 1841	Re-elected in 1835. Retired.	4	24th	4	Re-elected in 1831. Died.	Mar 4, 1825 – Dec 12, 1835	Jacksonian	Elias Kane (Kaskaskia)	3
4	John M. Robinson (Carmi)	Jacksonian	Dec 11, 1830 – Mar 3, 1841	Re-elected in 1835. Retired.	4	24th	4		Dec 12, 1835 – Dec 30, 1835	Vacant		
4	John M. Robinson (Carmi)	Jacksonian	Dec 11, 1830 – Mar 3, 1841	Re-elected in 1835. Retired.	4	24th	4	Appointed to finish Kane's term. Lost election to full term.	Dec 30, 1835 – Mar 3, 1837	Jacksonian	William Lee D. Ewing (Vandalia)	4
4	John M. Robinson (Carmi)	Democratic	Dec 11, 1830 – Mar 3, 1841	Re-elected in 1835. Retired.	4	25th	5	Elected in 1837. Retired.	Mar 4, 1837 – Mar 3, 1843	Democratic	Richard M. Young (Quincy)	5
4	John M. Robinson (Carmi)	Democratic	Dec 11, 1830 – Mar 3, 1841	Re-elected in 1835. Retired.	4	26th	5	Elected in 1837. Retired.	Mar 4, 1837 – Mar 3, 1843	Democratic	Richard M. Young (Quincy)	5
5	Samuel McRoberts (Danville)	Democratic	Mar 4, 1841 – Mar 27, 1843	Elected in 1841. Died.	5	27th	5	Elected in 1837. Retired.	Mar 4, 1837 – Mar 3, 1843	Democratic	Richard M. Young (Quincy)	5
5	Samuel McRoberts (Danville)	Democratic	Mar 4, 1841 – Mar 27, 1843	Elected in 1841. Died.	5	28th	6	Elected in 1843. Lost renomination.	Mar 4, 1843 – Mar 3, 1849	Democratic	Sidney Breese (Carlyle)	6
Vacant			Mar 27, 1843 – Aug 16, 1843		5	28th	6	Elected in 1843. Lost renomination.	Mar 4, 1843 – Mar 3, 1849	Democratic	Sidney Breese (Carlyle)	6
6	James Semple (Alton)	Democratic	Aug 16, 1843 – Mar 3, 1847	Appointed to continue McRoberts's term. Elected in 1844 to finish McRoberts's term. Retired.	5	28th	6	Elected in 1843. Lost renomination.	Mar 4, 1843 – Mar 3, 1849	Democratic	Sidney Breese (Carlyle)	6
6	James Semple (Alton)	Democratic	Aug 16, 1843 – Mar 3, 1847	Appointed to continue McRoberts's term. Elected in 1844 to finish McRoberts's term. Retired.	5	29th	6	Elected in 1843. Lost renomination.	Mar 4, 1843 – Mar 3, 1849	Democratic	Sidney Breese (Carlyle)	6
7	Stephen A. Douglas (Chicago)	Democratic	Mar 4, 1847 – Jun 3, 1861	Elected in 1846.	6	30th	6	Elected in 1843. Lost renomination.	Mar 4, 1843 – Mar 3, 1849	Democratic	Sidney Breese (Carlyle)	6
7	Stephen A. Douglas (Chicago)	Democratic	Mar 4, 1847 – Jun 3, 1861	Elected in 1846.	6	31st	7	Elected in 1849. Election voided. (Note: Shields was not seated because he had not been a citizen for the required nine years. He reached that mark on October 21, 1849, so his subsequent election was accepted by the Senate.)	Mar 4, 1849 – Mar 15, 1849	Democratic	James Shields (Belleville)	7
7	Stephen A. Douglas (Chicago)	Democratic	Mar 4, 1847 – Jun 3, 1861	Elected in 1846.	6	31st	7		Mar 15, 1849 – Oct 27, 1849	Vacant		7
7	Stephen A. Douglas (Chicago)	Democratic	Mar 4, 1847 – Jun 3, 1861	Elected in 1846.	6	31st	7	Elected to finish his own term. Lost re-election.	Oct 27, 1849 – Mar 3, 1855	Democratic	James Shields (Belleville)	7
7	Stephen A. Douglas (Chicago)	Democratic	Mar 4, 1847 – Jun 3, 1861	Elected in 1846.	6	32nd	7	Elected to finish his own term. Lost re-election.	Oct 27, 1849 – Mar 3, 1855	Democratic	James Shields (Belleville)	7
7	Stephen A. Douglas (Chicago)	Democratic	Mar 4, 1847 – Jun 3, 1861	Re-elected in 1852.	7	33rd	7	Elected to finish his own term. Lost re-election.	Oct 27, 1849 – Mar 3, 1855	Democratic	James Shields (Belleville)	7
7	Stephen A. Douglas (Chicago)	Democratic	Mar 4, 1847 – Jun 3, 1861	Re-elected in 1852.	7	34th	8	Elected in 1855.	Mar 4, 1855 – Mar 3, 1873	Democratic	Lyman Trumbull (Chicago)	8
7	Stephen A. Douglas (Chicago)	Democratic	Mar 4, 1847 – Jun 3, 1861	Re-elected in 1852.	7	35th	8	Elected in 1855.	Mar 4, 1855 – Mar 3, 1873	Republican	Lyman Trumbull (Chicago)	8
7	Stephen A. Douglas (Chicago)	Democratic	Mar 4, 1847 – Jun 3, 1861	Re-elected in 1859. Died.	8	36th	8	Elected in 1855.	Mar 4, 1855 – Mar 3, 1873	Republican	Lyman Trumbull (Chicago)	8
7	Stephen A. Douglas (Chicago)	Democratic	Mar 4, 1847 – Jun 3, 1861	Re-elected in 1859. Died.	8	37th	9	Re-elected in 1861.	Mar 4, 1855 – Mar 3, 1873	Republican	Lyman Trumbull (Chicago)	8
Vacant			Jun 3, 1861 – Jun 26, 1861		8	37th	9	Re-elected in 1861.	Mar 4, 1855 – Mar 3, 1873	Republican	Lyman Trumbull (Chicago)	8
8	Orville Browning (Quincy)	Republican	Jun 26, 1861 – Jan 12, 1863	Appointed to continue Douglas's term. Retired.	8	37th	9	Re-elected in 1861.	Mar 4, 1855 – Mar 3, 1873	Republican	Lyman Trumbull (Chicago)	8
9	William A. Richardson (Quincy)	Democratic	Jan 12, 1863 – Mar 3, 1865	Elected to finish Douglas's term. Retired.	8	37th	9	Re-elected in 1861.	Mar 4, 1855 – Mar 3, 1873	Republican	Lyman Trumbull (Chicago)	8
9	William A. Richardson (Quincy)	Democratic	Jan 12, 1863 – Mar 3, 1865	Elected to finish Douglas's term. Retired.	8	38th	9	Re-elected in 1861.	Mar 4, 1855 – Mar 3, 1873	Republican	Lyman Trumbull (Chicago)	8
10	Richard Yates (Jacksonville)	Republican	Mar 4, 1865 – Mar 3, 1871	Elected in 1864 or 1865. Retired.	9	39th	9	Re-elected in 1861.	Mar 4, 1855 – Mar 3, 1873	Republican	Lyman Trumbull (Chicago)	8
10	Richard Yates (Jacksonville)	Republican	Mar 4, 1865 – Mar 3, 1871	Elected in 1864 or 1865. Retired.	9	40th	10	Re-elected in 1867. Lost re-election.	Mar 4, 1855 – Mar 3, 1873	Republican	Lyman Trumbull (Chicago)	8
10	Richard Yates (Jacksonville)	Republican	Mar 4, 1865 – Mar 3, 1871	Elected in 1864 or 1865. Retired.	9	41st	10	Re-elected in 1867. Lost re-election.	Mar 4, 1855 – Mar 3, 1873	Republican	Lyman Trumbull (Chicago)	8
11	John A. Logan (Chicago)	Republican	Mar 4, 1871 – Mar 3, 1877	Elected in 1870 or 1871. Lost re-election.	10	42nd	10	Re-elected in 1867. Lost re-election.	Mar 4, 1855 – Mar 3, 1873	Liberal; Republican	Lyman Trumbull (Chicago)	8
11	John A. Logan (Chicago)	Republican	Mar 4, 1871 – Mar 3, 1877	Elected in 1870 or 1871. Lost re-election.	10	43rd	11	Elected in 1873. Retired.	Mar 4, 1873 – Mar 3, 1879	Republican	Richard J. Oglesby (Decatur)	9
11	John A. Logan (Chicago)	Republican	Mar 4, 1871 – Mar 3, 1877	Elected in 1870 or 1871. Lost re-election.	10	44th	11	Elected in 1873. Retired.	Mar 4, 1873 – Mar 3, 1879	Republican	Richard J. Oglesby (Decatur)	9
12	David Davis (Bloomington)	Independent	Mar 4, 1877 – Mar 3, 1883	Elected in 1877. Retired.	11	45th	11	Elected in 1873. Retired.	Mar 4, 1873 – Mar 3, 1879	Republican	Richard J. Oglesby (Decatur)	9
12	David Davis (Bloomington)	Independent	Mar 4, 1877 – Mar 3, 1883	Elected in 1877. Retired.	11	46th	12	Elected in 1879.	Mar 4, 1879 – Mar 3, 1885	Republican	John A. Logan (Chicago)	10
12	David Davis (Bloomington)	Independent	Mar 4, 1877 – Mar 3, 1883	Elected in 1877. Retired.	11	47th	12	Elected in 1879.	Mar 4, 1879 – Mar 3, 1885	Republican	John A. Logan (Chicago)	10
13	Shelby M. Cullom (Springfield)	Republican	Mar 4, 1883 – Mar 3, 1913	Elected in 1882.	12	48th	12	Elected in 1879.	Mar 4, 1879 – Mar 3, 1885	Republican	John A. Logan (Chicago)	10
13	Shelby M. Cullom (Springfield)	Republican	Mar 4, 1883 – Mar 3, 1913	Elected in 1882.	12	49th	13	Legislature failed to elect.	Mar 4, 1885 – May 18, 1885	Vacant		10
13	Shelby M. Cullom (Springfield)	Republican	Mar 4, 1883 – Mar 3, 1913	Elected in 1882.	12	49th	13	Re-elected late in 1885. Died.	May 19, 1885 – Dec 26, 1886	Republican	John A. Logan (Chicago)	10
13	Shelby M. Cullom (Springfield)	Republican	Mar 4, 1883 – Mar 3, 1913	Elected in 1882.	12	49th	13		Dec 26, 1886 – Jan 19, 1887	Vacant		
13	Shelby M. Cullom (Springfield)	Republican	Mar 4, 1883 – Mar 3, 1913	Elected in 1882.	12	49th	13	Elected to finish Logan's term. Retired.	Jan 19, 1887 – Mar 3, 1891	Republican	Charles Farwell (Chicago)	11
13	Shelby M. Cullom (Springfield)	Republican	Mar 4, 1883 – Mar 3, 1913	Elected in 1882.	12	50th	13	Elected to finish Logan's term. Retired.	Jan 19, 1887 – Mar 3, 1891	Republican	Charles Farwell (Chicago)	11
13	Shelby M. Cullom (Springfield)	Republican	Mar 4, 1883 – Mar 3, 1913	Re-elected in 1888.	13	51st	13	Elected to finish Logan's term. Retired.	Jan 19, 1887 – Mar 3, 1891	Republican	Charles Farwell (Chicago)	11
13	Shelby M. Cullom (Springfield)	Republican	Mar 4, 1883 – Mar 3, 1913	Re-elected in 1888.	13	52nd	14	Elected in 1890. Retired.	Mar 4, 1891 – Mar 3, 1897	Democratic	John Palmer (Springfield)	12
13	Shelby M. Cullom (Springfield)	Republican	Mar 4, 1883 – Mar 3, 1913	Re-elected in 1888.	13	53rd	14	Elected in 1890. Retired.	Mar 4, 1891 – Mar 3, 1897	Democratic	John Palmer (Springfield)	12
13	Shelby M. Cullom (Springfield)	Republican	Mar 4, 1883 – Mar 3, 1913	Re-elected in 1894.	14	54th	14	Elected in 1890. Retired.	Mar 4, 1891 – Mar 3, 1897	Democratic	John Palmer (Springfield)	12
13	Shelby M. Cullom (Springfield)	Republican	Mar 4, 1883 – Mar 3, 1913	Re-elected in 1894.	14	55th	15	Elected in 1897. Retired.	Mar 4, 1897 – Mar 3, 1903	Republican	William Mason (Chicago)	13
13	Shelby M. Cullom (Springfield)	Republican	Mar 4, 1883 – Mar 3, 1913	Re-elected in 1894.	14	56th	15	Elected in 1897. Retired.	Mar 4, 1897 – Mar 3, 1903	Republican	William Mason (Chicago)	13
13	Shelby M. Cullom (Springfield)	Republican	Mar 4, 1883 – Mar 3, 1913	Re-elected in 1901.	15	57th	15	Elected in 1897. Retired.	Mar 4, 1897 – Mar 3, 1903	Republican	William Mason (Chicago)	13
13	Shelby M. Cullom (Springfield)	Republican	Mar 4, 1883 – Mar 3, 1913	Re-elected in 1901.	15	58th	16	Elected in 1903. Lost re-election.	Mar 4, 1903 – Mar 3, 1909	Republican	Albert Hopkins (Aurora)	14
13	Shelby M. Cullom (Springfield)	Republican	Mar 4, 1883 – Mar 3, 1913	Re-elected in 1901.	15	59th	16	Elected in 1903. Lost re-election.	Mar 4, 1903 – Mar 3, 1909	Republican	Albert Hopkins (Aurora)	14
13	Shelby M. Cullom (Springfield)	Republican	Mar 4, 1883 – Mar 3, 1913	Re-elected in 1907. Lost renomination.	16	60th	16	Elected in 1903. Lost re-election.	Mar 4, 1903 – Mar 3, 1909	Republican	Albert Hopkins (Aurora)	14
13	Shelby M. Cullom (Springfield)	Republican	Mar 4, 1883 – Mar 3, 1913	Re-elected in 1907. Lost renomination.	16	61st	17		Mar 4, 1909 – Jun 18, 1909	Vacant		
13	Shelby M. Cullom (Springfield)	Republican	Mar 4, 1883 – Mar 3, 1913	Re-elected in 1907. Lost renomination.	16	61st	17	Elected in 1909, but ineligible until resignation from U.S. House. Election voided.	Jun 18, 1909 – Jul 13, 1912	Republican	William Lorimer (Chicago)	15
13	Shelby M. Cullom (Springfield)	Republican	Mar 4, 1883 – Mar 3, 1913	Re-elected in 1907. Lost renomination.	16	62nd	17	Elected in 1909, but ineligible until resignation from U.S. House. Election voided.	Jun 18, 1909 – Jul 13, 1912	Republican	William Lorimer (Chicago)	15
13	Shelby M. Cullom (Springfield)	Republican	Mar 4, 1883 – Mar 3, 1913	Re-elected in 1907. Lost renomination.	16	62nd	17		Jul 13, 1912 – Mar 26, 1913	Vacant		
Vacant			Mar 4, 1913 – Mar 26, 1913	Legislature elected late.	17	63rd	17		Jul 13, 1912 – Mar 26, 1913	Vacant		
14	J. Hamilton Lewis (Chicago)	Democratic	Mar 26, 1913 – Mar 3, 1919	Elected late in 1913. Lost re-election.	17	63rd	17	Elected in 1913 to finish Lorimer's term.	Mar 26, 1913 – Mar 3, 1921	Republican	Lawrence Y. Sherman (Springfield)	16
14	J. Hamilton Lewis (Chicago)	Democratic	Mar 26, 1913 – Mar 3, 1919	Elected late in 1913. Lost re-election.	17	64th	18	Re-elected in 1914. Retired.	Mar 26, 1913 – Mar 3, 1921	Republican	Lawrence Y. Sherman (Springfield)	16
14	J. Hamilton Lewis (Chicago)	Democratic	Mar 26, 1913 – Mar 3, 1919	Elected late in 1913. Lost re-election.	17	65th	18	Re-elected in 1914. Retired.	Mar 26, 1913 – Mar 3, 1921	Republican	Lawrence Y. Sherman (Springfield)	16
15	Medill McCormick (Chicago)	Republican	Mar 4, 1919 – Feb 25, 1925	Elected in 1918. Lost renomination and died just before the end of the term.	18	66th	18	Re-elected in 1914. Retired.	Mar 26, 1913 – Mar 3, 1921	Republican	Lawrence Y. Sherman (Springfield)	16
15	Medill McCormick (Chicago)	Republican	Mar 4, 1919 – Feb 25, 1925	Elected in 1918. Lost renomination and died just before the end of the term.	18	67th	19	Elected in 1920. Lost renomination and died just before the end of the term.	Mar 4, 1921 – Dec 7, 1926	Republican	William B. McKinley (Champaign)	17
15	Medill McCormick (Chicago)	Republican	Mar 4, 1919 – Feb 25, 1925	Elected in 1918. Lost renomination and died just before the end of the term.	18	68th	19	Elected in 1920. Lost renomination and died just before the end of the term.	Mar 4, 1921 – Dec 7, 1926	Republican	William B. McKinley (Champaign)	17
16	Charles S. Deneen (Chicago)	Republican	Feb 26, 1925 – Mar 3, 1931	Appointed to finish McCormick's term, having already been elected to the next term.	18	68th	19	Elected in 1920. Lost renomination and died just before the end of the term.	Mar 4, 1921 – Dec 7, 1926	Republican	William B. McKinley (Champaign)	17
16	Charles S. Deneen (Chicago)	Republican	Feb 26, 1925 – Mar 3, 1931	Elected in 1924. Lost renomination.	19	69th	19	Elected in 1920. Lost renomination and died just before the end of the term.	Mar 4, 1921 – Dec 7, 1926	Republican	William B. McKinley (Champaign)	17
16	Charles S. Deneen (Chicago)	Republican	Feb 26, 1925 – Mar 3, 1931	Elected in 1924. Lost renomination.	19	69th	19	Appointed to continue McKinley's term. Not seated/resigned. (Note: When Smith presented his credentials to serve the remainder of McKinley's term, the Senate refused to seat him based on what it saw as an election rife with fraud and corruption. When Smith returned with his credentials for the term he was elected to, the Senate again refused to seat him for the same reasons. Smith and the Governor considered him to be the rightful senator, but he resigned in February 1928. The Senate does not consider him to have been a senator.)	Dec 7, 1926	Republican	Frank L. Smith (Dwight)	18
16	Charles S. Deneen (Chicago)	Republican	Feb 26, 1925 – Mar 3, 1931	Elected in 1924. Lost renomination.	19	69th	19		Dec 7, 1926 – Dec 3, 1928	Vacant		
16	Charles S. Deneen (Chicago)	Republican	Feb 26, 1925 – Mar 3, 1931	Elected in 1924. Lost renomination.	19	70th	20		Dec 7, 1926 – Dec 3, 1928	Vacant		
16	Charles S. Deneen (Chicago)	Republican	Feb 26, 1925 – Mar 3, 1931	Elected in 1924. Lost renomination.	19	70th	20	Elected to finish the term. Lost re-election.	Dec 3, 1928 – Mar 3, 1933	Republican	Otis F. Glenn (Murphysboro)	19
16	Charles S. Deneen (Chicago)	Republican	Feb 26, 1925 – Mar 3, 1931	Elected in 1924. Lost renomination.	19	71st	20	Elected to finish the term. Lost re-election.	Dec 3, 1928 – Mar 3, 1933	Republican	Otis F. Glenn (Murphysboro)	19
17	J. Hamilton Lewis (Chicago)	Democratic	Mar 4, 1931 – Apr 9, 1939	Elected in 1930.	20	72nd	20	Elected to finish the term. Lost re-election.	Dec 3, 1928 – Mar 3, 1933	Republican	Otis F. Glenn (Murphysboro)	19
17	J. Hamilton Lewis (Chicago)	Democratic	Mar 4, 1931 – Apr 9, 1939	Elected in 1930.	20	73rd	21	Elected in 1932. Retired.	Mar 4, 1933 – Jan 3, 1939	Democratic	William H. Dieterich (Beardstown)	20
17	J. Hamilton Lewis (Chicago)	Democratic	Mar 4, 1931 – Apr 9, 1939	Elected in 1930.	20	74th	21	Elected in 1932. Retired.	Mar 4, 1933 – Jan 3, 1939	Democratic	William H. Dieterich (Beardstown)	20
17	J. Hamilton Lewis (Chicago)	Democratic	Mar 4, 1931 – Apr 9, 1939	Re-elected in 1936. Died.	21	75th	21	Elected in 1932. Retired.	Mar 4, 1933 – Jan 3, 1939	Democratic	William H. Dieterich (Beardstown)	20
17	J. Hamilton Lewis (Chicago)	Democratic	Mar 4, 1931 – Apr 9, 1939	Re-elected in 1936. Died.	21	76th	22	Elected in 1938.	Jan 3, 1939 – Jan 3, 1951	Democratic	Scott W. Lucas (Havana)	21
Vacant			Apr 9, 1939 – Apr 14, 1939		21	76th	22	Elected in 1938.	Jan 3, 1939 – Jan 3, 1951	Democratic	Scott W. Lucas (Havana)	21
18	James M. Slattery (Chicago)	Democratic	Apr 14, 1939 – Nov 21, 1940	Appointed to continue Lewis's term. Lost election to finish Lewis's term.	21	76th	22	Elected in 1938.	Jan 3, 1939 – Jan 3, 1951	Democratic	Scott W. Lucas (Havana)	21
19	C. Wayland Brooks (Chicago)	Republican	Nov 22, 1940 – Jan 3, 1949	Elected to finish Lewis's term.	21	76th	22	Elected in 1938.	Jan 3, 1939 – Jan 3, 1951	Democratic	Scott W. Lucas (Havana)	21
19	C. Wayland Brooks (Chicago)	Republican	Nov 22, 1940 – Jan 3, 1949	Elected to finish Lewis's term.	21	77th	22	Elected in 1938.	Jan 3, 1939 – Jan 3, 1951	Democratic	Scott W. Lucas (Havana)	21
19	C. Wayland Brooks (Chicago)	Republican	Nov 22, 1940 – Jan 3, 1949	Re-elected in 1942. Lost re-election.	22	78th	22	Elected in 1938.	Jan 3, 1939 – Jan 3, 1951	Democratic	Scott W. Lucas (Havana)	21
19	C. Wayland Brooks (Chicago)	Republican	Nov 22, 1940 – Jan 3, 1949	Re-elected in 1942. Lost re-election.	22	79th	23	Re-elected in 1944. Lost re-election.	Jan 3, 1939 – Jan 3, 1951	Democratic	Scott W. Lucas (Havana)	21
19	C. Wayland Brooks (Chicago)	Republican	Nov 22, 1940 – Jan 3, 1949	Re-elected in 1942. Lost re-election.	22	80th	23	Re-elected in 1944. Lost re-election.	Jan 3, 1939 – Jan 3, 1951	Democratic	Scott W. Lucas (Havana)	21
20	Paul Douglas (Chicago)	Democratic	Jan 3, 1949 – Jan 3, 1967	Elected in 1948.	23	81st	23	Re-elected in 1944. Lost re-election.	Jan 3, 1939 – Jan 3, 1951	Democratic	Scott W. Lucas (Havana)	21
20	Paul Douglas (Chicago)	Democratic	Jan 3, 1949 – Jan 3, 1967	Elected in 1948.	23	82nd	24	Elected in 1950.	Jan 3, 1951 – Sep 7, 1969	Republican	Everett Dirksen (Pekin)	22
20	Paul Douglas (Chicago)	Democratic	Jan 3, 1949 – Jan 3, 1967	Elected in 1948.	23	83rd	24	Elected in 1950.	Jan 3, 1951 – Sep 7, 1969	Republican	Everett Dirksen (Pekin)	22
20	Paul Douglas (Chicago)	Democratic	Jan 3, 1949 – Jan 3, 1967	Re-elected in 1954.	24	84th	24	Elected in 1950.	Jan 3, 1951 – Sep 7, 1969	Republican	Everett Dirksen (Pekin)	22
20	Paul Douglas (Chicago)	Democratic	Jan 3, 1949 – Jan 3, 1967	Re-elected in 1954.	24	85th	25	Re-elected in 1956.	Jan 3, 1951 – Sep 7, 1969	Republican	Everett Dirksen (Pekin)	22
20	Paul Douglas (Chicago)	Democratic	Jan 3, 1949 – Jan 3, 1967	Re-elected in 1954.	24	86th	25	Re-elected in 1956.	Jan 3, 1951 – Sep 7, 1969	Republican	Everett Dirksen (Pekin)	22
20	Paul Douglas (Chicago)	Democratic	Jan 3, 1949 – Jan 3, 1967	Re-elected in 1960. Lost re-election.	25	87th	25	Re-elected in 1956.	Jan 3, 1951 – Sep 7, 1969	Republican	Everett Dirksen (Pekin)	22
20	Paul Douglas (Chicago)	Democratic	Jan 3, 1949 – Jan 3, 1967	Re-elected in 1960. Lost re-election.	25	88th	26	Re-elected in 1962.	Jan 3, 1951 – Sep 7, 1969	Republican	Everett Dirksen (Pekin)	22
20	Paul Douglas (Chicago)	Democratic	Jan 3, 1949 – Jan 3, 1967	Re-elected in 1960. Lost re-election.	25	89th	26	Re-elected in 1962.	Jan 3, 1951 – Sep 7, 1969	Republican	Everett Dirksen (Pekin)	22
21	Charles H. Percy (Wilmette)	Republican	Jan 3, 1967 – Jan 3, 1985	Elected in 1966.	26	90th	26	Re-elected in 1962.	Jan 3, 1951 – Sep 7, 1969	Republican	Everett Dirksen (Pekin)	22
21	Charles H. Percy (Wilmette)	Republican	Jan 3, 1967 – Jan 3, 1985	Elected in 1966.	26	91st	27	Re-elected in 1968. Died.	Jan 3, 1951 – Sep 7, 1969	Republican	Everett Dirksen (Pekin)	22
21	Charles H. Percy (Wilmette)	Republican	Jan 3, 1967 – Jan 3, 1985	Elected in 1966.	26	91st	27		Sep 7, 1969 – Sep 17, 1969	Vacant		
21	Charles H. Percy (Wilmette)	Republican	Jan 3, 1967 – Jan 3, 1985	Elected in 1966.	26	91st	27	Appointed to continue Dirksen's term. Lost election to finish Dirksen's term.	Sep 17, 1969 – Nov 3, 1970	Republican	Ralph T. Smith (Alton)	23
21	Charles H. Percy (Wilmette)	Republican	Jan 3, 1967 – Jan 3, 1985	Elected in 1966.	26	91st	27		Nov 3, 1970 – Nov 17, 1970	Vacant		
21	Charles H. Percy (Wilmette)	Republican	Jan 3, 1967 – Jan 3, 1985	Elected in 1966.	26	91st	27	Elected to finish Dirksen's term.	Nov 17, 1970 – Jan 3, 1981	Democratic	Adlai Stevenson III (Chicago)	24
21	Charles H. Percy (Wilmette)	Republican	Jan 3, 1967 – Jan 3, 1985	Elected in 1966.	26	92nd	27	Elected to finish Dirksen's term.	Nov 17, 1970 – Jan 3, 1981	Democratic	Adlai Stevenson III (Chicago)	24
21	Charles H. Percy (Wilmette)	Republican	Jan 3, 1967 – Jan 3, 1985	Re-elected in 1972.	27	93rd	27	Elected to finish Dirksen's term.	Nov 17, 1970 – Jan 3, 1981	Democratic	Adlai Stevenson III (Chicago)	24
21	Charles H. Percy (Wilmette)	Republican	Jan 3, 1967 – Jan 3, 1985	Re-elected in 1972.	27	94th	28	Re-elected in 1974. Retired.	Nov 17, 1970 – Jan 3, 1981	Democratic	Adlai Stevenson III (Chicago)	24
21	Charles H. Percy (Wilmette)	Republican	Jan 3, 1967 – Jan 3, 1985	Re-elected in 1972.	27	95th	28	Re-elected in 1974. Retired.	Nov 17, 1970 – Jan 3, 1981	Democratic	Adlai Stevenson III (Chicago)	24
21	Charles H. Percy (Wilmette)	Republican	Jan 3, 1967 – Jan 3, 1985	Re-elected in 1978. Lost re-election.	28	96th	28	Re-elected in 1974. Retired.	Nov 17, 1970 – Jan 3, 1981	Democratic	Adlai Stevenson III (Chicago)	24
21	Charles H. Percy (Wilmette)	Republican	Jan 3, 1967 – Jan 3, 1985	Re-elected in 1978. Lost re-election.	28	97th	29	Elected in 1980.	Jan 3, 1981 – Jan 3, 1993	Democratic	Alan J. Dixon (Belleville)	25
21	Charles H. Percy (Wilmette)	Republican	Jan 3, 1967 – Jan 3, 1985	Re-elected in 1978. Lost re-election.	28	98th	29	Elected in 1980.	Jan 3, 1981 – Jan 3, 1993	Democratic	Alan J. Dixon (Belleville)	25
22	Paul Simon (Makanda)	Democratic	Jan 3, 1985 – Jan 3, 1997	Elected in 1984.	29	99th	29	Elected in 1980.	Jan 3, 1981 – Jan 3, 1993	Democratic	Alan J. Dixon (Belleville)	25
22	Paul Simon (Makanda)	Democratic	Jan 3, 1985 – Jan 3, 1997	Elected in 1984.	29	100th	30	Re-elected in 1986. Lost renomination.	Jan 3, 1981 – Jan 3, 1993	Democratic	Alan J. Dixon (Belleville)	25
22	Paul Simon (Makanda)	Democratic	Jan 3, 1985 – Jan 3, 1997	Elected in 1984.	29	101st	30	Re-elected in 1986. Lost renomination.	Jan 3, 1981 – Jan 3, 1993	Democratic	Alan J. Dixon (Belleville)	25
22	Paul Simon (Makanda)	Democratic	Jan 3, 1985 – Jan 3, 1997	Re-elected in 1990. Retired.	30	102nd	30	Re-elected in 1986. Lost renomination.	Jan 3, 1981 – Jan 3, 1993	Democratic	Alan J. Dixon (Belleville)	25
22	Paul Simon (Makanda)	Democratic	Jan 3, 1985 – Jan 3, 1997	Re-elected in 1990. Retired.	30	103rd	31	Elected in 1992. Lost re-election.	Jan 3, 1993 – Jan 3, 1999	Democratic	Carol Moseley Braun (Chicago)	26
22	Paul Simon (Makanda)	Democratic	Jan 3, 1985 – Jan 3, 1997	Re-elected in 1990. Retired.	30	104th	31	Elected in 1992. Lost re-election.	Jan 3, 1993 – Jan 3, 1999	Democratic	Carol Moseley Braun (Chicago)	26
23	Dick Durbin (Springfield)	Democratic	Jan 3, 1997 – present	Elected in 1996.	31	105th	31	Elected in 1992. Lost re-election.	Jan 3, 1993 – Jan 3, 1999	Democratic	Carol Moseley Braun (Chicago)	26
23	Dick Durbin (Springfield)	Democratic	Jan 3, 1997 – present	Elected in 1996.	31	106th	32	Elected in 1998. Retired.	Jan 3, 1999 – Jan 3, 2005	Republican	Peter Fitzgerald (Inverness)	27
23	Dick Durbin (Springfield)	Democratic	Jan 3, 1997 – present	Elected in 1996.	31	107th	32	Elected in 1998. Retired.	Jan 3, 1999 – Jan 3, 2005	Republican	Peter Fitzgerald (Inverness)	27
23	Dick Durbin (Springfield)	Democratic	Jan 3, 1997 – present	Re-elected in 2002.	32	108th	32	Elected in 1998. Retired.	Jan 3, 1999 – Jan 3, 2005	Republican	Peter Fitzgerald (Inverness)	27
23	Dick Durbin (Springfield)	Democratic	Jan 3, 1997 – present	Re-elected in 2002.	32	109th	33	Elected in 2004. Resigned, having been elected President of the United States.	Jan 3, 2005 – Nov 16, 2008	Democratic	Barack Obama (Chicago)	28
23	Dick Durbin (Springfield)	Democratic	Jan 3, 1997 – present	Re-elected in 2002.	32	110th	33	Elected in 2004. Resigned, having been elected President of the United States.	Jan 3, 2005 – Nov 16, 2008	Democratic	Barack Obama (Chicago)	28
23	Dick Durbin (Springfield)	Democratic	Jan 3, 1997 – present	Re-elected in 2002.	32	110th	33		Nov 16, 2008 – Jan 12, 2009	Vacant		
23	Dick Durbin (Springfield)	Democratic	Jan 3, 1997 – present	Re-elected in 2008.	33	111th	33		Nov 16, 2008 – Jan 12, 2009	Vacant		
23	Dick Durbin (Springfield)	Democratic	Jan 3, 1997 – present	Re-elected in 2008.	33	111th	33	Appointed to continue Obama's term, certified late. Retired when successor qualified.	Jan 12, 2009 – Nov 29, 2010	Democratic	Roland Burris (Chicago)	29
23	Dick Durbin (Springfield)	Democratic	Jan 3, 1997 – present	Re-elected in 2008.	33	111th	33	Elected to finish Obama's term. (Note: Kirk was elected to fill the remainder of Barack Obama's term in a special election held the same day as the general election for the next term, which he also won.)	Nov 29, 2010 – Jan 3, 2017	Republican	Mark Kirk (Highland Park)	30
23	Dick Durbin (Springfield)	Democratic	Jan 3, 1997 – present	Re-elected in 2008.	33	112th	34	Elected to full term in 2010. Lost re-election.	Nov 29, 2010 – Jan 3, 2017	Republican	Mark Kirk (Highland Park)	30
23	Dick Durbin (Springfield)	Democratic	Jan 3, 1997 – present	Re-elected in 2008.	33	113th	34	Elected to full term in 2010. Lost re-election.	Nov 29, 2010 – Jan 3, 2017	Republican	Mark Kirk (Highland Park)	30
23	Dick Durbin (Springfield)	Democratic	Jan 3, 1997 – present	Re-elected in 2014.	34	114th	34	Elected to full term in 2010. Lost re-election.	Nov 29, 2010 – Jan 3, 2017	Republican	Mark Kirk (Highland Park)	30
23	Dick Durbin (Springfield)	Democratic	Jan 3, 1997 – present	Re-elected in 2014.	34	115th	35	Elected in 2016.	Jan 3, 2017 – present	Democratic	Tammy Duckworth (Hoffman Estates)	31
23	Dick Durbin (Springfield)	Democratic	Jan 3, 1997 – present	Re-elected in 2014.	34	116th	35	Elected in 2016.	Jan 3, 2017 – present	Democratic	Tammy Duckworth (Hoffman Estates)	31
23	Dick Durbin (Springfield)	Democratic	Jan 3, 1997 – present	Re-elected in 2020. Retiring at the end of term.	35	117th	35	Elected in 2016.	Jan 3, 2017 – present	Democratic	Tammy Duckworth (Hoffman Estates)	31
23	Dick Durbin (Springfield)	Democratic	Jan 3, 1997 – present	Re-elected in 2020. Retiring at the end of term.	35	118th	36	Re-elected in 2022.	Jan 3, 2017 – present	Democratic	Tammy Duckworth (Hoffman Estates)	31
23	Dick Durbin (Springfield)	Democratic	Jan 3, 1997 – present	Re-elected in 2020. Retiring at the end of term.	35	119th	36	Re-elected in 2022.	Jan 3, 2017 – present	Democratic	Tammy Duckworth (Hoffman Estates)	31
24	Juliana Stratton (elect) (Chicago)	Democratic	Taking office Jan 3, 2027	Elected in 2026.	36	120th	36	Re-elected in 2022.	Jan 3, 2017 – present	Democratic	Tammy Duckworth (Hoffman Estates)	31
24	Juliana Stratton (elect) (Chicago)	Democratic	Taking office Jan 3, 2027	Elected in 2026.	36	121st	37	To be determined in the 2028 election.				
24	Juliana Stratton (elect) (Chicago)	Democratic	Taking office Jan 3, 2027	Elected in 2026.	36	122nd	37	To be determined in the 2028 election.				
To be determined in the 2032 election.					37	123rd	37	To be determined in the 2028 election.				

== See also ==
- Elections in Illinois
- Illinois's congressional delegations
- List of United States representatives from Illinois
