= 1970 United States Senate special election in Illinois =

- November 3, 1970
- Turnout: 67.43%
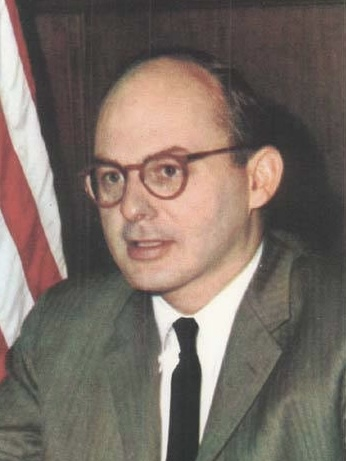

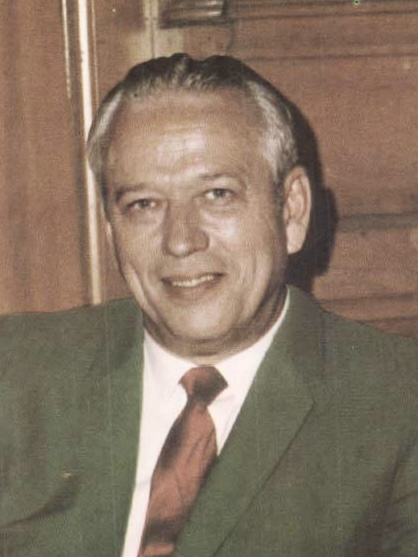
Nominee	Adlai Stevenson III	Ralph Tyler Smith
Party	Democratic	Republican
Popular vote	2,065,054	1,519,718
Percentage	57.37%	42.22%
- County results Stevenson: 40–50% 50–60% 60–70% Smith: 40–50% 50–60% 60–70%
U.S. senator before election
Ralph Tyler Smith
Republican
Elected U.S. senator
Adlai Stevenson III
Democratic

The 1970 United States Senate special election in Illinois was held on November 3, 1970, to fill the remainder of the term of Republican Everett Dirksen, who had died in office. Republican Ralph Tyler Smith had been appointed to fill the seat after Dirksen's death, and he lost the special election to Democrat Adlai Stevenson III. This election was the third consecutive time in which a United States Senate election in Illinois took place two years after a previous United States Senate election in Illinois after 1966 and 1968.

== Background ==
The primaries and general election coincided with those for House and state elections.

Primaries were held on March 17. Turnout in the primary elections was 26.28%, with a total of 1,381,147 votes cast. Turnout during the general election was 67.43%, with 3,599,272 votes cast.

== Republican primary ==
=== Candidates ===
- Lar "America First" Daly, perennial candidate
- William H. Rentschler, chair of the Richard Nixon 1968 presidential campaign in Illinois
- Ralph Tyler Smith, interim Senator since 1969 and former Speaker of the Illinois House of Representatives

=== Campaign ===
Rentschler accused Smith of acquiring the Senate seat through a corrupt deal with Governor Richard Ogilvie. Smith himself denied the charge, pointing out that Ogilvie declined to support him in the primary.

Rentschler also criticized Vice President Spiro Agnew and Senator Charles Percy for endorsing Smith, arguing that party leaders should stay out of the primary race. Rentschler had previously worked on campaigns for Percy and Agnew in 1964 and 1968, respectively.

=== Results ===
Republican primary
Party	Candidate	Votes	%
Republican	Ralph Tyler Smith (incumbent)	414,489	58.84
Republican	William H. Rentschler	271,648	38.57
Republican	Lar "America First" Daly	18,244	2.59
Write-in		16	0.00
Total votes		704,397	100

== Democratic primary ==
=== Candidates ===
- Adlai Stevenson III, Illinois Treasurer and son of Adlai Stevenson II

Democratic primary
Party	Candidate	Votes	%
Democratic	Adlai E. Stevenson, III	676,689	99.99
Write-in		61	0.01
Total votes		676,750	100

== General election ==
General election
Party	Candidate	Votes	%
Democratic	Adlai Stevenson III	2,065,054	57.37%
Republican	Ralph Tyler Smith (incumbent)	1,519,718	42.22%
Socialist Workers	Lynn Henderson	8,859	0.25%
Socialist Labor	Louis Fisher	5,564	0.15%
None	Scattering	77	0.00%
Majority		545,336	15.15%
Turnout		3,599,272	
Democratic gain from Republican			
