= James Dooley =

James Dooley may refer to:

- James A. Dooley (1914–1978), American jurist
- James Dooley (composer) (born 1976), film score composer
- James H. Dooley (1841–1922), Virginia lawyer and politician
- James Dooley (New South Wales politician) (1877–1950), twice premier of New South Wales in the early 1920s
- Jim Dooley (1930–2008), former American football player
- James Dooley (Rhode Island politician) (1886–1960), sports figure in Rhode Island
- James Monaghan Dooley (1822–1891), Irish-born surveyor and politician in Tasmania, Australia
- Jim Perry (né Dooley, 1933–2015), Canadian television personality
