= Louis Fisher (politician) =

American politician (1913–2001)

Louis Fisher (March 20, 1913 – November 28, 2001) was the Socialist Labor Party of America candidate for United States President in the 1972 Presidential election.

== Politics career ==
Fisher ran for Governor of Illinois twice unsuccessfully. In 1944, he ran for Secretary of State of Illinois. He ran for Senator from Illinois four times: in 1956, 1960, 1968, and 1970.

In 1972 Fisher was the Socialist Labor Party of America's candidate for President of the United States. Genevieve Gunderson ran for Vice President as his running mate. Fisher was reportedly "the party's top vote-getting presidential candidate."

He was also a political scholar and staunch opponent of the line-item veto.

Preceded by Henning A. Blomen	Socialist Labor Party Presidential candidate 1972	Succeeded by Jules Levin
Preceded by Charles Storm	Socialist Labor Party Illinois Gubernatorial candidate 1948, 1952	Succeeded by Edward C. Gross
