= Justice Dooley =

Justice Dooley may refer to:

- James A. Dooley (1914–1978), associate justice of the Supreme Court of Illinois
- John Dooley (judge) (born 1944), associate justice of the Vermont Supreme Court

== See also ==
- Judge Dooley (disambiguation)
