= William G. Clark =

American judge

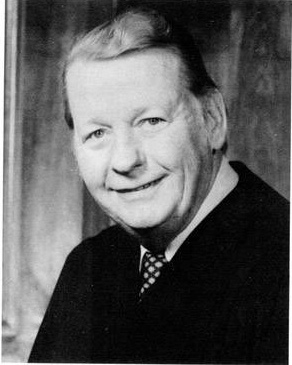
- Official portrait, 1981

Chief Justice of the Illinois Supreme Court
- In office 1985–1988
- Preceded by: Howard C. Ryan
- Succeeded by: Thomas J. Moran

Justice of the Illinois Supreme Court
- In office December 1976 – December 8, 1992
- Preceded by: Thomas E. Kluczynski
- Succeeded by: Mary Ann McMorrow

Illinois Attorney General
- In office January 1961 – January 1969
- Preceded by: William L. Guild
- Succeeded by: William J. Scott

Majority Leader of the Illinois House of Representatives
- In office January 1959 – January 1961

Member of the Illinois House of Representatives
- In office January 1957 – January 1961
- Preceded by: W. Dean McNully/ William C. Harris/ James P. Lannon (Note: Multi-member constituency. In the previous term, the 16th district was represented by three representatives who no longer represented it during Clark's first term: W. Dean McNully, William C. Harris (redistricted to the 41st district), James P. Lannon)
- Succeeded by: Robert F. McPartlin
- Constituency: 16th district
- In office January 1953 – January 1955
- Preceded by: Edward J. McCabe/ Robert Petrone
- Succeeded by: Louis F. Capuzi/ Robert Cutro
- Constituency: 21st district

Member of the Illinois Senate from the 21st district
- In office January 1955 – January 1957
- Preceded by: Norman C. Barry

Personal details
- Born: July 16, 1924 Chicago, Illinois, U.S.
- Died: August 17, 2001 (aged 77) Evanston or Skokie, Illinois, U.S.
- Resting place: Calvary Cemetery
- Party: Democratic
- Spouse: Rosalie Locatis
- Children: 5
- Parents: John S. Clark III (father); Ita Kennedy (mother)
- Education: Loyola University Chicago; University of Michigan; Michigan State University; DePaul University College of Law
- Profession: Attorney

Military service
- Allegiance: United States
- Branch/service: United States Army
- Battles/wars: World War II

William George Clark (July 16, 1924 – August 17, 2001) was an American attorney, politician, and jurist who served as an Illinois state legislator (1953–1961), attorney general of Illinois (1961–1969), and as a justice of the Illinois Supreme Court (1976–1992). The offices Clark held covered all three branches of the Illinois governor (judiciary, executive, and legislative).

Clark was a scion of a long-established Chicago family. After serving in the United States Army during World War II, Clark began an attorney. A Democrat, he entered politics as a member of the Illinois General Assembly (state legislature) in the 1950s, serving in the Illinois House of Representatives (1953–1955; 1957–1959) and Illinois Senate (1955–1957). He served one term as the Illinois House majority leader (1959–1961). Clark served two terms as Illinois attorney general, having won election to the office in 1960 and 1964. In 1968, Clark unsuccessfully ran as the Democratic nominee for U.S. Senate in Illinois. After this law, Clark returned to private legal practice, before winning election to the Illinois Supreme Court in 1976, serving in that court from 1977 until retiring in 1992. From 1985 through 1988, he was the court's chief justice.

== Early life and family history ==
Clark was born in Chicago, Illinois, on July 16, 1924, the son of John S. Clark (1892–1960) and Ita Kennedy Clark. He had two brothers, John S. Clark 5th and Donald G. Clark. He was raised in the Austin neighborhood on the West Side of Chicago. His father held public office as Cook County Assessor and a member of the Chicago City Council.

Clark was a paternal grandson of John S. Clark (1855–1911), who had served as both a state legislator and a member of the Chicago City Council. Further, Clark was a direct descendant of early Chicago settlers. His early Chicago forebears had accumulated a share of real estate in the city that had generated substantial wealth for the family.

== Education, military service, early career ==
For primary school, Clark attended Resurrection Grammar School, which was located in his childhood neighborhood. For high school, he attended boarding school at Campion High School (located in Prairie du Chien, Wisconsin).

Clark attended Michigan State University, Loyola University Chicago, and University of Michigan; receiving a pre-law education at the latter two universities. During World War II, Clark served in the United States Army. After the war, he received his law degree at DePaul University College of Law in Chicago. He was admitted to the Illinois bar in 1947.

Clark initially practiced law privately for five years at the Chicago firm of Crane, Kearney, Phelan, and Clark. He was a member of the Chicago Bar Association, Illinois Bar Association, West Suburban Bar Association, and American Bar Association. In 1952, Clark was appointed by Illinois Governor Adlai Stevenson II to serve as the attorney for the Public Administrator of Cook County. He continued to also privately practice at his law firm during this time, as well as during his subsequent terms as a state legislator.

== State legislator ==
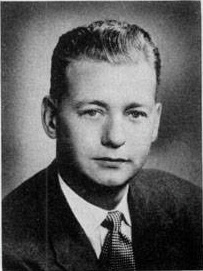
Official portrait, 1953

In 1952, Clark was elected to the Illinois House of Representatives as member of the Democrat. He held the same seat in the state house that his grandfather had held fifty years prior, representing the 21st district.

In 1954, Clark was elected to the Illinois Senate, representing the 21st district. While in the state senate, Clark served as chairman of the senate's tax commission, and led efforts to augment the state's tax laws. Hey also headed the "Citizens for Daley" organization during Richard J. Daley's successful first campaign for mayor in the 1955 Chicago mayoral election. He became closely acquainted with Daley through this.

At the request of Mayor Daley, Clark did not finish his term as state senator. Instead, in 1956, he ran to rejoin the state house. Winning a state house seat in the 16th district, he resigned his state senate seat early and rejoined the state house. He was re-elected to the state house in 1958. During his second stint in the state house, he took stands in opposition to imposing property taxes on personal automobiles and household furnishings, and advocated in support of reforming state probate law in order to lessen costs incurred. Clark was also co-sponsor of the legislation that allowed the city of Chicago to annex the land of O'Hare Field. During the 71st Illinois General Assembly, Clark served as the Illinois House majority leader. He had been elected to this position at the age of 34, following a tense campaign for the position in which he won the position against the objections influential downstate state representative Paul Powell.

== Illinois Attorney General ==
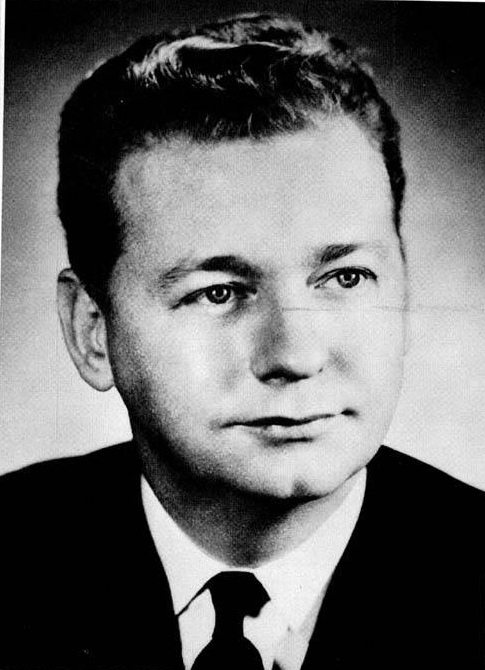
Official portrait photograph, circa 1961

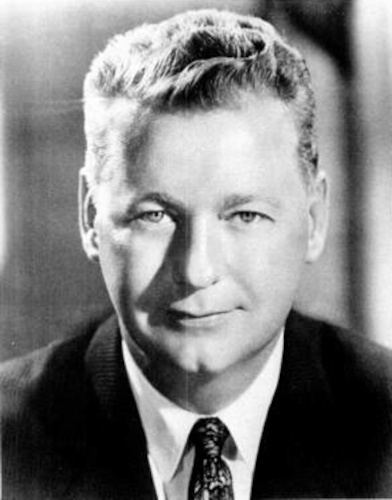
Official portrait photograph, circa 1963

In 1960, Clark initially contemplated running to unseat popular Republican incumbent Ben Adamowski as Cook County state's attorney. However, party slatemakers instead had him run in the Illinois attorney general election. Clark won the election and was re-elected in 1964, serving two terms as Illinois attorney general from 1961 through 1969.

As attorney general, Clark drafted legislation that was ultimately ratified as the first consumer fraud statute in the state's history. After its ratification, Clark established a consumer fraud office to enforce the statute.

As attorney general, Clark also heightened enforcement of pollution control measures against air pollution and water pollution. Clark also endorsed proposed legislation he argued would create more favorable conditions for charitable nonprofits.

=== Unusccessful 1968 U.S. Senate campaign, return to private practice of law ===
Rather than seek re-election as attorney in 1968, Clark considered either running in the state's gubernatorial election or U.S. Senate election that year, ultimately deciding to campaign for the latter office.

The political climate of the 1968 election was impacted by debate over the Vietnam War and the tumultuous events 1968 Democratic National Convention held in Chicago. Clark attracted national attention as the Democratic nominee for Senate by opposing President Lyndon B. Johnson's Vietnam policies, and by attempting to have the party adopt a "peace plank" in its party platform at the 1968 convention. This created discord between Clark and Mayor Daley, who was aligned with Johnson and viewed Clark's actions as disloyal. This created a permanent break between Clark and the Daley-led political machine, which never again supported Clark for office.

Clark was ultimately defeated for U.S. Senate by Republican incumbent Everett Dirksen. The election was the only loss among the eighteen elections in which he appeared on a ballot for public office.

When Dirksen died in 1969, Clark considered running in the special election for the senate seat, but opted against doing so after Adlai Stevenson III (son of the late Governor Stevenson) expressed his own interest in running. He soon pivoted to taking early steps running for the U.S. House of Representatives left vacant by the death of Daniel J. Ronan, but ended these efforts when a crowded field of office seekers emerged and Clark believed he would have insufficient support to win.

Having already left office attorney general, and being out of public office for the first time in many years, Clark returned to the private practice of law at the firm of Harvey, Hodes, Costello, & Burman. He remained at the firm until becoming a judge.

== Illinois Supreme Court ==
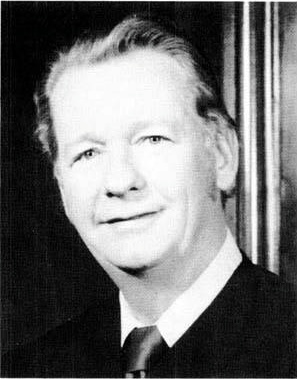
Official portrait, 1979

Official portrait, 1983

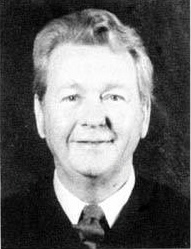
Official portrait, 1985

In 1976, Clark successfully ran as the Democratic Party's nominee for the Cook County seat on the Illinois Supreme Court left open by the retirement of Thomas E. Kluczynski. Clark did not receive the backing of Mayor Daley, and his victory for the party's nomination without Daley's backing was regarded as a surprise by many political experts. In the general election, Clark defeated Republican nominee Lawrence X. Pusateri, a former state legislator and past president of the Illinois Bar Association.

Clark remained a justice of the court for sixteen years (1976–1992), retaining his seat in a 1988 retention election. He was the court's chief justice from 1985 to 1988. In the 1990s, Chicago writer Steve Neal praised Clark's public service, opining that he had "set [high] standards for leadership in three branches of Illinois government."

Clark authored more than 400 opinions as a justice. Two of the more notable cases were People v. Coslet and People v. Spreitzer, which dealt with attorneys conflicts of interest in representing clients in homicide cases.

While a justice, Clark voiced support for the idea of replacing the state's direct-election of judges with a merit selection system.

Clark retired from the court in 1992, citing chronic issues with his neck and legs that had made him unable to dedicate the necessary amount attention to his work as judge. Privately, Clark was suffering from issues with diabetes. He left office and Mary Ann McMorrow was sworn-in to succeed him on December 8, 1992.

== Later life and death ==
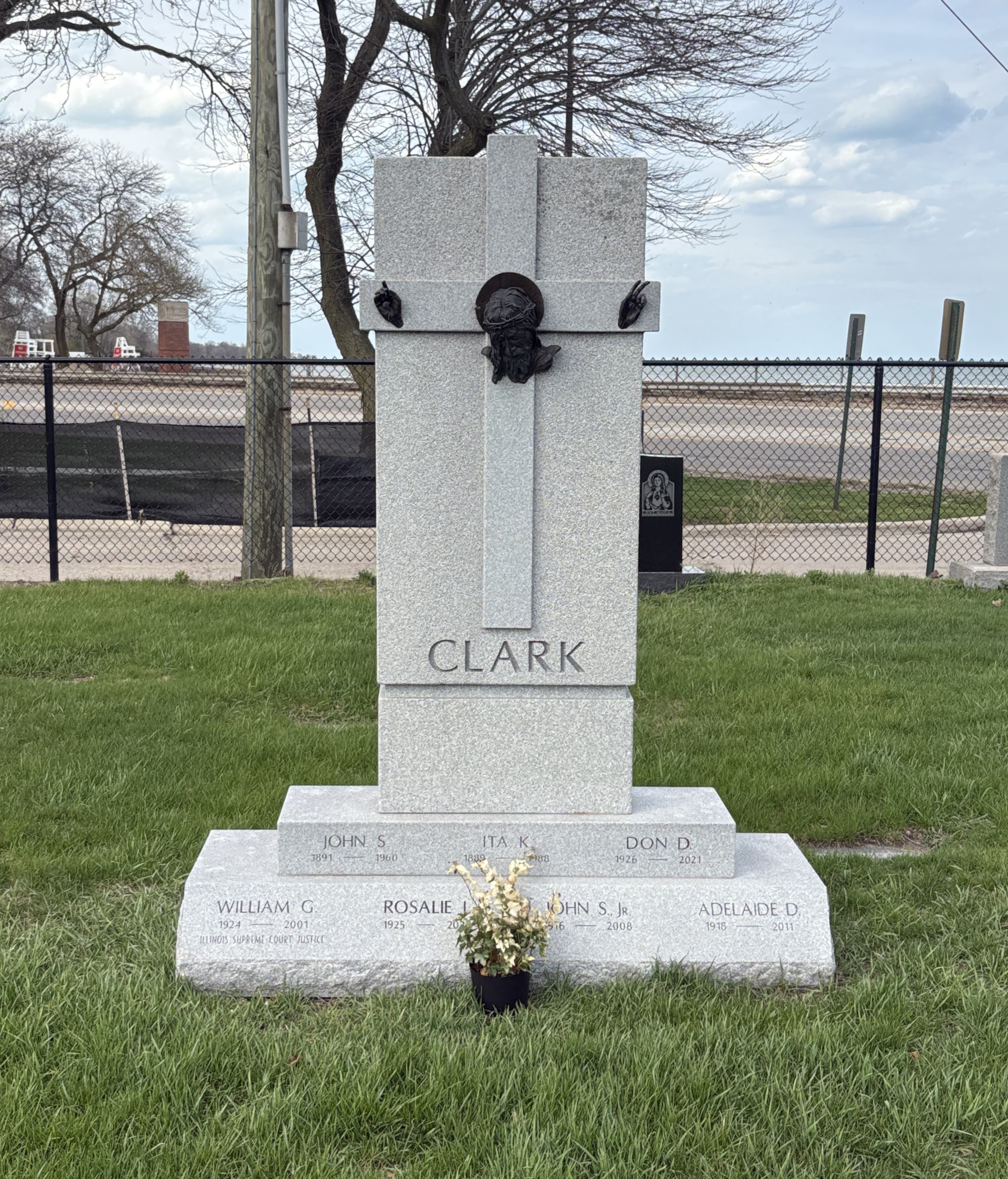
Clark's grave at Calvary Cemetery

After retiring from the court, Clark served as counsel to a legal firm led by his son, William G. Clark Jr.

In his retirement, health issues from his diabetes continued to accumulate. Clark died from complications with his diabetes on August 17, 2001, in either the Chicago suburb of Evanston or Skokie. A mass was held for him at Holy Name Cathedral in Chicago, and he was buried at Calvary Cemetery in Evanston.

== Personal life, honors ==
Clark was married to the former Rosalie Locatis, with whom he had five children.

Clark was a member of the Irish Fellow Club of Chicago, University Club of Loyola, Chicago Athletic Association, Ancient Order of Hibernians, Delta Theta Phi legal fraternity, Catholic War Veterans, Commodore Barry post of the American Legion, Ted Knusman AMVETS post, Benevolent and Protective Order of Elks, and Loyal Order of Moose.

Clark was inducted as an honorary fellow of the Illinois Bar Foundation, and was given an honorary degree by the John Marshall Law School (today known as "University of Illinois Chicago School of Law".

== Notes ==
Party political offices
Preceded by James L. O'Keefe	Democratic nominee for Attorney General of Illinois; 1960, 1964	Succeeded by Francis S. Lorenz
Preceded by Sidney R. Yates	Democratic nominee for U.S. Senator from Illinois (Class 3); 1968	Succeeded by Adlai Stevenson III
Legal offices
Preceded by William L. Guild	Attorney General of Illinois; 1961–1969	Succeeded by William J. Scott
Preceded by Thomas E. Kluczynski	Justice of the Illinois Supreme Court; 1976–1992	Succeeded by Mary Ann McMorrow
