= Lawrence X. Pusateri =

American politician, lawyer, and judge (1931–2005)

Justice of the Illinois Appellate Court from the 1st district
- In office May 1977 – May 1978
- Preceded by: John C. Hayes
- Succeeded by: L. Sheldon Brown

Personal details
- Born: May 25, 1931 Oak Park, Illinois
- Died: November 24, 2005 (aged 74) Chicago, Illinois
- Party: Republican
- Education: DePaul University

Lawrence X. Pusateri (May 25, 1931 – November 24, 2005) was an American politician, lawyer, and judge.

Born in Oak Park, Illinois, Pusateri graduated from DePaul University College of Law. From 1954 to 1957, Pusateri served in the United States Army and was a judge advocate. From 1965 to 1969, Pusateri served in the Illinois House of Representatives and was a Republican. He served as president of the Illinois State Bar Association. He also served on the Illinois Pardon and Parole Board and the Illinois Judicial Inquiry Board.

In the 1976 general election, Pusateri was the Republican candidate for Illinois Supreme Court to fill the vacancy left by the retirement of Thomas E. Kluczynski. Former Illinois Attorney General and Democratic candidate William G. Clark defeated Pusateri. In 1977, at the recommendation of his 1976 opponent, Pusateri was appointed to the Illinois Appellate Court to fill the vacancy created by the death of John C. Hayes. He was sworn in on May 31, 1977. Less than a year later, Pusateri stepped down from the bench and was succeeded by L. Sheldon Brown.

Pusateri died from cancer of the colon at his home in Chicago, Illinois.
