= Kluczyński =

Kluczyński, feminine: Kluczyńska is a Polish surname. Notable people with this surname include:

- John C. Kluczynski
- Thomas E. Kluczynski
- Wincenty Kluczyński
