= Ralph T. Smith =

American politician (1915–1972)

Ralph Tyler Smith
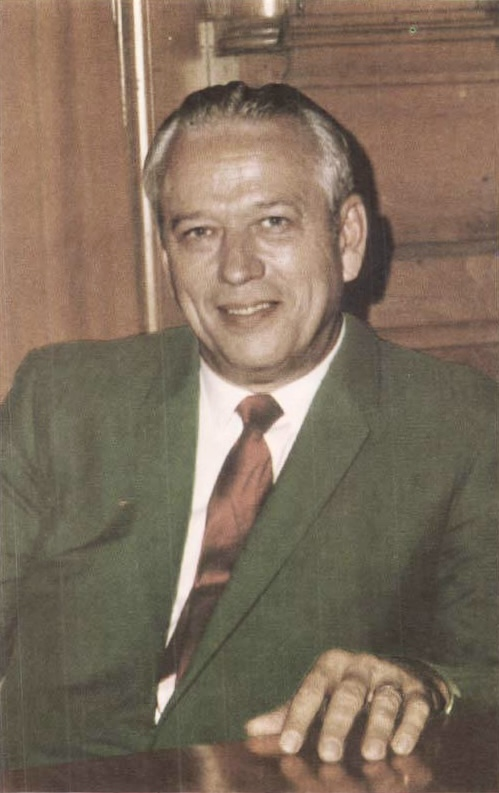

United States Senator from Illinois
- In office September 17, 1969 – November 16, 1970
- Appointed by: Richard B. Ogilvie
- Preceded by: Everett Dirksen
- Succeeded by: Adlai Stevenson III

Speaker of the Illinois House of Representatives
- In office January 4, 1967 – September 17, 1969
- Preceded by: John Touhy
- Succeeded by: Jack Walker

Personal details
- Born: October 6, 1915 Granite City, Illinois, U.S.
- Died: August 13, 1972 (aged 56) Alton, Illinois, U.S.
- Party: Republican
- Education: Illinois College (BA); Washington University in St. Louis (JD)

Military service
- Allegiance: United States
- Branch/service: United States Navy
- Battles/wars: World War II

Ralph Tyler Smith (October 6, 1915 – August 13, 1972) was an American lawyer and politician from Illinois, who served as a United States Senator from Illinois from 1969 until 1970. A member of the Republican Party, Smith previously served in the Illinois state house from 1955 through 1969, including two years as Speaker of the House of Representatives from 1967 to 1969, prior to his appointment to the senate by governor Richard Ogilvie. He lost re-election to Adlai Stevenson III in the 1970 special election.

== Early life and education ==
Ralph Tyler Smith was born in Granite City, Illinois, on October 6, 1915. Smith graduated from Illinois College in 1937 and from Washington University School of Law in 1940. He began the practice of law that same year. He worked as an attorney for C. & I.M. Railway Company in Springfield, Illinois.

== Military career ==
Shortly after the start of World War II, Smith enlisted in the United States Navy Reserve, and commissioned an ensign. He served as an instructor in the Naval Midshipman School at Notre Dame University. He was then transferred to the USS PC-1182, a PC-461-class submarine chaser, which escorted convoys. He then went to Guam to take command of the USS PGM-28, a PGM-9-class motor gunboat in 1945. After a period of minesweeping in Okinawa, Smith was released into inactive duty as a lieutenant.

== Political career ==
=== Illinois general assembly ===
After his active navy service, he moved to Alton, Illinois and resumed the practice of law. In 1954, he was elected to the Illinois General Assembly, the legislative branch of the government of Illinois. He was re-elected for seven succeeding terms between 1954 and 1968, before becoming majority whip in 1963, and later speaker in 1967.

=== United States Senate ===
Upon the death of Everett Dirksen, Governor Richard B. Ogilvie appointed Smith to fill the vacancy in the United States Senate. He served from September 17, 1969, to November 16, 1970. He ran for re-election in the 1970 special election, but was defeated by Adlai E. Stevenson III, the son of former Illinois governor Adlai Stevenson II. When Smith ran against Stevenson, the Utah College Republicans sent a 19-year-old student, Karl Rove, to work on Smith's campaign.

== Later life and death ==
Following his defeat in 1970, he returned to practicing law. He died on August 13, 1972, in Alton.

Party political offices
Preceded by Everett Dirksen	Republican nominee for U.S. Senator from Illinois (Class 3); 1970	Succeeded by George Burditt
U.S. Senate
Preceded by Everett Dirksen	U.S. senator (Class 3) from Illinois; 1969–1970; Served alongside: Charles H. Percy	Succeeded by Adlai Stevenson III
