= John S. Clark (1892–1960) =

Cook County Assessor
- In office 1934–1954
- Preceded by: J.L. Jacobs
- Succeeded by: Frank Keenan

Member of the Chicago City Council
- In office 1917–1934
- Preceded by: Conrad H. Janke
- Succeeded by: Edward J. Upton
- Constituency: 35th ward (1917-1923); 30th ward (1923-1934)

Personal details
- Born: 1892
- Died: January 19, 1960 (age 69) Columbus Memorial Hospital in Chicago, Illinois
- Resting place: Calvary Cemetery
- Party: Democratic
- Spouse: Ita Kennedy
- Children: 3 (including William)
- Parents: John S. Clark (father); Delia Pierce (mother)

John S. Clark (Note: Referred to in sources as either "John S. Clark Jr." or "John S. Clark III") (1892 – January 19, 1960) was an American politician who was for seventeen years as a member of the Chicago City Council (1917–1934) and for twenty years the Cook County assessor (1934–1954).

== Early life and career ==
Clark was born in 1892. He was the son of John S. Clark (1855–1911), who served as a member of the Chicago City Council and the Illinois House of Representatives.

Clark worked at John S. Clark & Sons, a real estate and home construction firm that his father had founded in 1889.

== Chicago City Council ==
Clark served as an alderman on the Chicago City Council for seventeen years, being first elected in 1917 (at the young age of 25). Clark was first elected in the 35th ward. In 1923, he was re-districted to the 30th ward.

Because the city, at the time, had a practice of naming new city parks for sitting aldermen of wards in which the parks are located, Clark Park in Chicago (established in 1923) is named for him.

For many years, Clark was the Democratic committeeman for his ward. In 1927, Clark became chairman of the Finance Committee, a powerful position on the council.

Clark was an Illinois at-large alternate delegate to the 1928 Democratic National Convention.

Clark was widely touted as a potential mayoral Democratic candidate in 1931, but he stepped aside and instead supported Anton J. Cermak's successful bid for the mayoralty. Clark and Cermak came to be at odds with each other once Cermak became mayor, with Clark regularly opposing Cermak after Cermak attempted to oust him from his post as chairman of the Financial Committee.

After Cermak was assassinated in 1933, Clark was a top contender to be appointed acting mayor. In the initial aftermath of the assassination, it appeared that the top two contenders for the acting mayoralty would be Clark and James B. Bowler, with other top speculated contenders including Thomas A. Doyle and Jacob Arvey. Patrick Nash, a Democratic political boss, ultimately maneuvered for Frank J. Corr to be designated acting mayor on an interim basis. and for Edward J. Kelly to be appointed acting mayor after him.

== Cook County Assessor ==
In 1934, Clark won the first election for Cook County assessor, a new office which replaced a previous board of assessors. After winning this office, Clark resigned as alderman. Clark held the office for the next 20 years, retiring in 1954.

== Later career ==
After retiring from politics in 1954, Clark continued to lead John S. Clark & Sons.

== Personal life ==
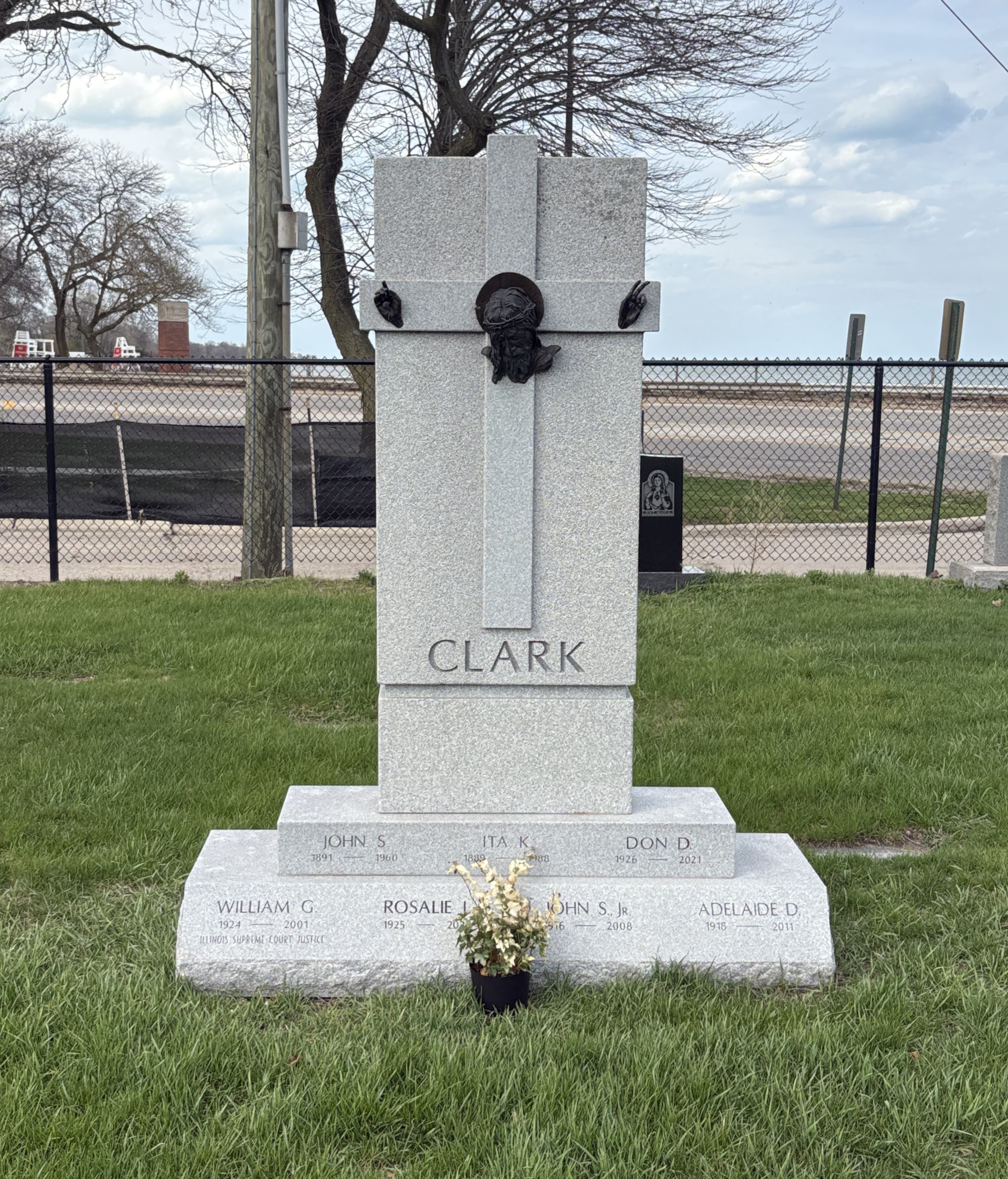
Clark's grave at Calvary Cemetery

Clark married the former Ita Kennedy and had three sons: John S Clark 5th, Donald G. Clark, and William G. Clark.

Clark died at the age of 69 on January 19, 1960 at Columbus Memorial Hospital in Chicago, and was buried at Calvary Cemetery in Evanston. He was survived by his widow, three sons, and five grandchildren.
