= Judge Dooley =

Judge Dooley may refer to:

- James Dooley (Rhode Island politician) (1886–1960), judge of the Rhode Island Eighth District Court
- Joseph Brannon Dooley (1889–1967), judge of the United States District Court for the Northern District of Texas
- Kari A. Dooley (born 1963), judge of the United States District Court for the District of Connecticut

== See also ==
- Justice Dooley (disambiguation)
