= Everett Dirksen =

American politician (1896–1969)

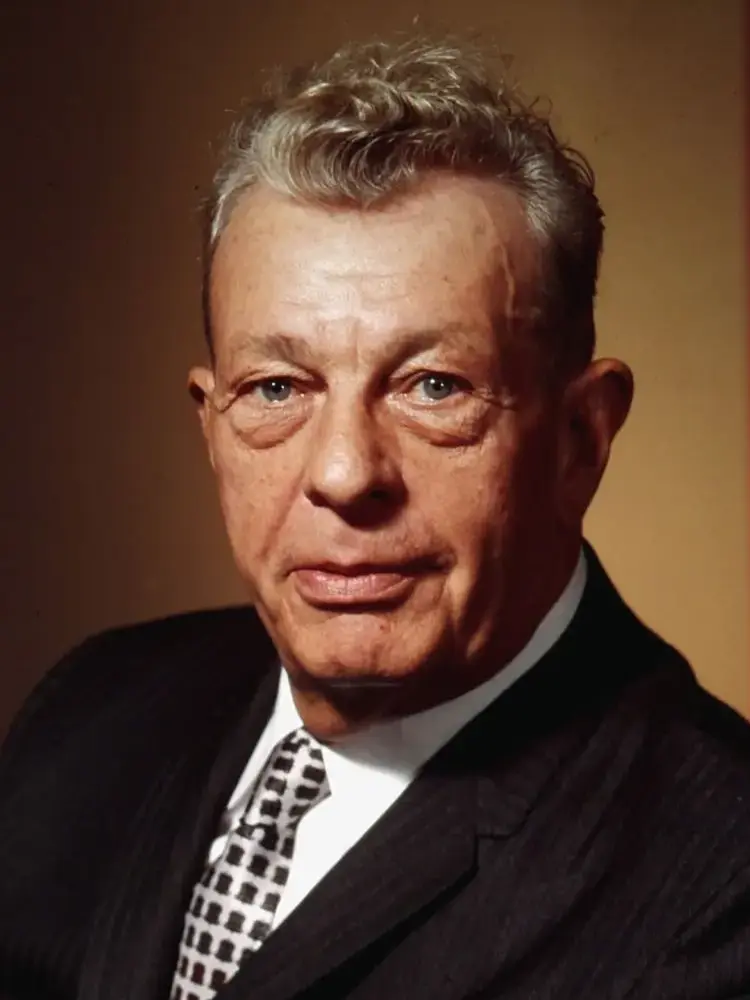
- Dirksen in 1962

United States Senator from Illinois
- In office January 3, 1951 – September 7, 1969
- Preceded by: Scott W. Lucas
- Succeeded by: Ralph Tyler Smith
Senate positions
Senate Minority Leader
In office January 3, 1959 – September 7, 1969
Deputy	Thomas Kuchel; Hugh Scott
Preceded by	William F. Knowland
Succeeded by	Hugh Scott
Senate Minority Whip
In office January 3, 1957 – January 3, 1959
Leader	William F. Knowland
Preceded by	Leverett Saltonstall
Succeeded by	Thomas Kuchel
Chair of the National Republican Senatorial Committee
In office January 3, 1957 – January 3, 1959
Leader	William Knowland
Preceded by	Barry Goldwater
Succeeded by	Andrew Frank Schoeppel
In office November 29, 1951 – January 3, 1955
Leader	Styles Bridges; Robert A. Taft; William Knowland
Preceded by	Styles Bridges
Succeeded by	Barry Goldwater

Member of the U.S. House of Representatives from Illinois's 16th district
- In office March 4, 1933 – January 3, 1949
- Preceded by: William E. Hull
- Succeeded by: Leo E. Allen

Personal details
- Born: Everett McKinley Dirksen; January 4, 1896 Pekin, Illinois, U.S.
- Died: September 7, 1969 (aged 73) Washington, D.C., U.S.
- Party: Republican
- Spouse: Louella Carver (m. 1927)
- Children: 1
- Education: University of Minnesota

Military service
- Branch/service: United States Army
- Years of service: 1918–1919
- Rank: Second Lieutenant
- Battles/wars: World War I

Everett McKinley Dirksen (January 4, 1896 – September 7, 1969) was an American politician. A Republican, he represented Illinois in the United States House of Representatives and the United States Senate. As Senate Minority Leader from 1959 until his death in 1969, he played a highly visible and key role in the politics of the 1960s. He helped write and pass the Civil Rights Act of 1964 and the Civil Rights Act of 1968, both landmark pieces of legislation during the civil rights movement. He was also one of the Senate's strongest supporters of the Vietnam War. A talented orator with a florid style and a notably rich bass voice, he delivered flamboyant speeches that caused his detractors to refer to him as "The Wizard of Ooze".

Born in Pekin, Illinois, Dirksen served as an artillery officer during World War I and opened a bakery after the war. After serving on the Pekin City Council, he won election to the House of Representatives in 1932. In the House, he was considered a moderate and supported much of the New Deal; he became more conservative and isolationist over time, but reversed himself to support US involvement in World War II. He won election to the Senate in 1950, unseating Senate Majority Leader Scott W. Lucas. In the Senate, he favored conservative economic policies and supported the internationalism of President Dwight D. Eisenhower. Dirksen succeeded William F. Knowland as Senate Minority Leader after the latter declined to seek re-election in 1958.

As the Senate Minority Leader, Dirksen emerged as a prominent national figure of the Republican Party during the 1960s. He developed a good working relationship with Senate Majority Leader Mike Mansfield and supported President Lyndon B. Johnson's handling of the Vietnam War. He helped break the Southern filibuster of the Civil Rights Act of 1964. While still serving as Senate Minority Leader, Dirksen died in 1969.

The Dirksen Senate Office Building at the Capitol Building in Washington, and the Dirksen United States Courthouse in central Chicago are named for him.

== Early life ==
Everett McKinley Dirksen was born on January 4, 1896, in Pekin, Illinois, a small city near Peoria. His parents were German immigrants from East Frisia near the Dutch border. His father Johann Friedrich Dirksen was born in Jennelt and his mother Antje (née Conrady) was born in Loquard. Today, both villages are part of the municipality of Krummhörn.

The Dirksens were strong Republicans. Everett's parents gave him the middle name "McKinley" after William McKinley, then a leading candidate for the Republican nomination for president. His fraternal twin, Thomas Reed Dirksen, was named for Speaker of the House Thomas Brackett Reed, also a candidate for the nomination at the time. Another brother, Benjamin, was named for President Benjamin Harrison. Everett had two older half-brothers, Thomas and Henry, from his mother's first marriage to Beren Ailts (died 1890).

Johann and Antje Dirksen spoke a Low German dialect at home and taught German to their children. Johann Dirksen farmed and worked at the Pekin Wagon Works as a design painter. He had a debilitating stroke when Everett was five years old and he died when Everett was nine.

Dirksen grew up on a farm managed by his mother in a neighborhood called Bonchefiddle (″Böhnchenviertel″, Low German for "beans quarter") on the outskirts of Pekin. The neighborhood was known as Bonchefiddle because frugal immigrants grew beans in their front yards instead of decorative flowers. He attended local schools and graduated from Pekin High School in 1913 as the class salutatorian. While in school, he helped support the family by working at a Pekin corn refining factory.

Dirksen attended the University of Minnesota, where he was a pre-law student from 1914 to 1917. He paid his tuition by working in the classified advertising department at the Minneapolis Tribune, as a door-to-door magazine and book salesman, as an attorney's assistant, and as a clerk in a railroad freight office. While attending the university, Dirksen participated in the Student Army Training Corps and attained the rank of major in the school's corps of cadets. He also gained his first political experience by giving local and on-campus speeches in support of Republican presidential nominee Charles Evans Hughes during the 1916 campaign.

== Military service ==
At the start of World War I, the Dirksens came under local scrutiny for their German heritage. Dirksen's mother refused to take down a living room photo of Kaiser Wilhelm II as demanded by a self-appointed Pekin "loyalty commission" on the grounds that "it's a free country." Benjamin Dirksen was medically unfit for military service and Thomas was married. It fell to Everett to demonstrate the family's patriotism by serving in uniform. He dropped out of college to enlist in the United States Army.

On January 4, 1917, his twenty-first birthday, Dirksen joined the United States Army. Three months later, the United States entered World War I. He completed his initial training in field artillery at Camp Custer, Michigan, performed duty with his unit at Camp Jackson, South Carolina, and attained the rank of sergeant. He was deployed to France in 1918 and attended artillery school and officer training at Saumur. He was commissioned as a second lieutenant and assigned to the 328th Field Artillery Regiment, a unit of the 85th Division. Dirksen was trained as an aerial observer and conducted target acquisition and assessment of field artillery bombardments in the Saint-Mihiel sector as a member of the 328th Field Artillery's 13th and 19th Balloon Companies. He later performed the same duty for the 69th Balloon Company, a unit of the IV Corps. He subsequently served in the intelligence staff section (G-2) of the IV Corps headquarters. Dirksen performed post-war occupation duty with IV Corps in Germany until mid-1919. Dirksen declined an opportunity to remain with the Army of Occupation (extended due to his fluent German), received his discharge, and returned to Pekin.

== Post-war ==
After the war, Dirksen invested money in an electric washing machine business, but it failed, after which he joined his brothers in running the Dirksen Brothers Bakery. He also wrote a number of unpublished short stories, as well as plays with former classmate Hubert Ropp. Dirksen was active in the American Legion, and his appearances on its behalf gave him the opportunity to hone his public speaking abilities.

His political career began in 1926 when he was elected to the nonpartisan Pekin City Council. He placed first in a field of eight candidates vying for four seats. At the time, the top vote-getter also received appointment as the city's commissioner of accounts and finance. Dirksen held both posts from 1927 to 1931.

== U.S. representative ==
=== Elections ===
In 1930, Dirksen unsuccessfully challenged incumbent Representative William E. Hull in the Republican primary. He lost by 1,155 votes, 51.06% to 48.94%. In 1932, he challenged Hull again, and won with 52.5% of the vote.

He was re-elected seven times from 1934 to 1946. His closest challenge came in 1936, when Charles C. Dickman held him to 53.25% of the vote amid a national and statewide landslide for the Democratic Party.

=== Tenure ===
His support for many New Deal programs initially marked him as a moderate, pragmatic Republican, though over time he became increasingly conservative and isolationist. During World War II, he lobbied successfully for an expansion of congressional staff resources to eliminate the practice under which House and Senate committees borrowed executive branch personnel to accomplish legislative work. He reversed his isolationist stance to support the war effort, but also secured the passage of an amendment to the Lend Lease Act by introducing it while 65 of the House's Democrats were at a luncheon. It provided that the Senate and the House could, by a simple majority in a concurrent resolution, revoke the war powers granted to the president.

Dirksen studied law privately in Washington, D.C. after he was elected to Congress. He was admitted to the District of Columbia Bar in 1936 and the bar of Illinois in 1937.

In December 1943, Dirksen announced that he would be a candidate for the Republican presidential nomination in 1944. He stated that a coalition of midwestern Republican representatives had urged him to run and that his campaign was serious. However, press pundits had assumed that the candidacy was a vehicle to siphon support away from the campaign of Wendell Willkie, whose reputation as a maverick and staunch internationalist had earned him the hatred of many Republican Party regulars, especially in the Midwest. Dirksen's presidential campaign was apparently still alive on the eve of the 1944 convention, as Time speculated that he was running for vice president. Dirksen received no votes for either office from delegates at the convention.

In 1947, Dirksen was diagnosed with chorioretinitis in his right eye. Despite a number of physicians recommending that the eye be removed, Dirksen chose treatment and rest; he recovered most of the sight in the afflicted eye. In 1948, he declined to run for re-election because of his ailment.

== U.S. senator ==
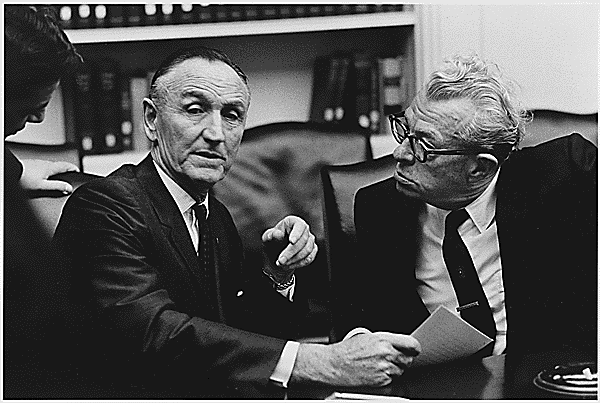
Senators Mike Mansfield (left) and Dirksen conversing in 1967.

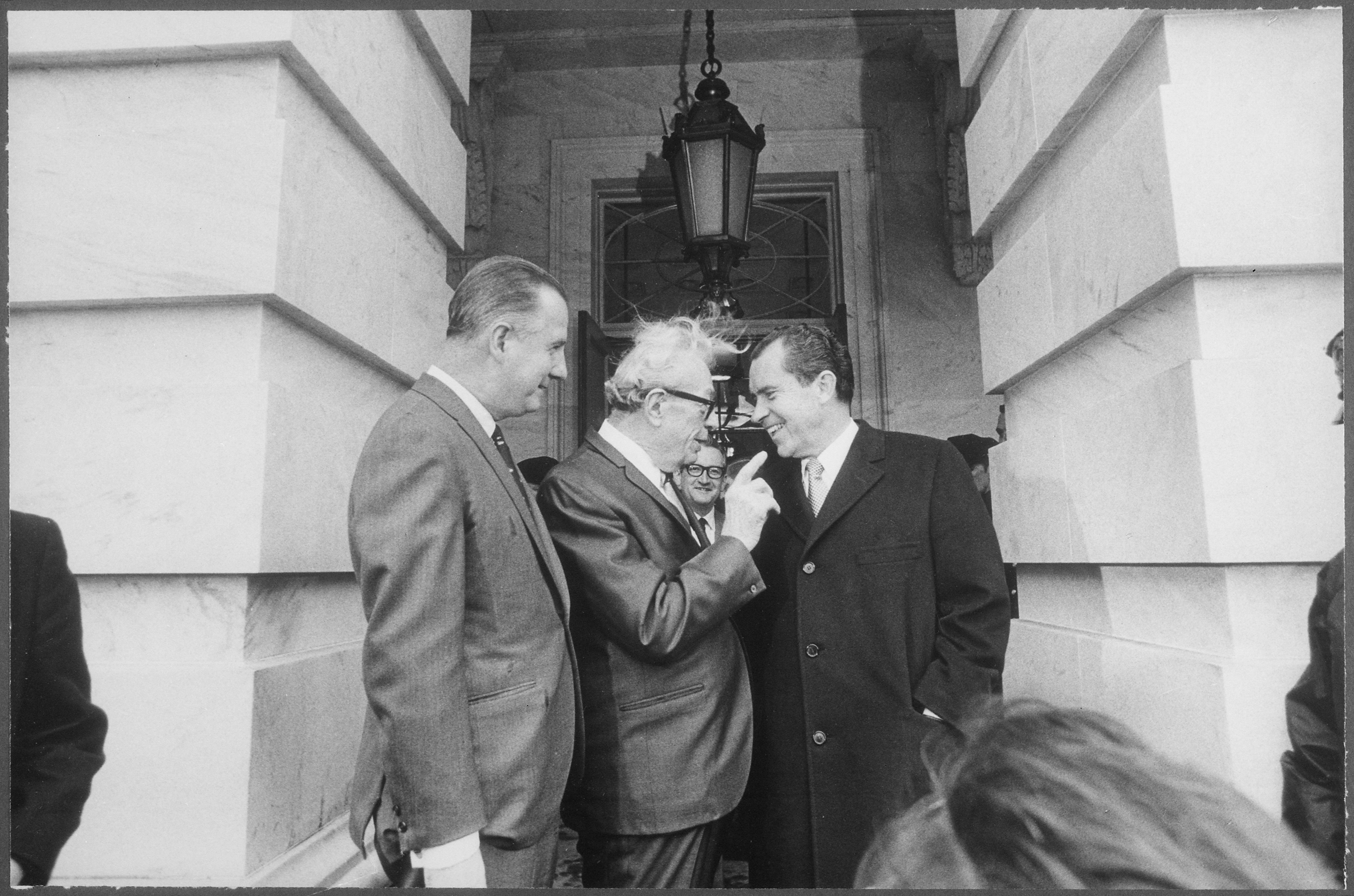
Dirksen with President Richard Nixon and Vice President Spiro Agnew on January 20, 1969.

Dirksen was a Republican Senator 1951–1969.

=== Elections ===
In 1950, Dirksen unseated Senate Majority Leader Scott W. Lucas. In the campaign, the support of Wisconsin Senator Joseph McCarthy helped Dirksen gain a narrow victory.

In 1956, Dirksen was re-elected over Democrat Richard Stengel, 54.1% to 45.7%.

In 1962, Dirksen was re-elected to a third term over Democrat Sidney R. Yates, 52.9% to 47.1%.

In 1968, Dirksen was re-elected to his fourth and final term over Democrat William G. Clark, 53.0% to 46.6%.

=== Tenure ===
In 1952, Dirksen supported the presidential candidacy of fellow Senator Robert A. Taft of Ohio, the longtime leader of the Republican party's conservative wing. At the national party convention, Dirksen gave a speech attacking New York Governor Thomas E. Dewey, a liberal Republican and the leading supporter of General Dwight Eisenhower. During his speech, Dirksen pointed at Dewey on the convention floor and shouted, "Don't take us down the path to defeat again", a reference to Dewey's presidential defeats in 1944 and 1948. His speech was met by cheers from conservative delegates and loud boos from pro-Eisenhower delegates. After Eisenhower won the nomination, Dirksen supported him, as he had said he would in his convention speech.

In 1959, he was elected Senate Minority Leader, defeating John Sherman Cooper, a more liberal senator from Kentucky, 20–14. Dirksen successfully united the various factions of the Republican Party by granting younger Republicans more representation in the Senate leadership and better committee appointments. He held the position of Senate Minority Leader until his death.

Along with House Minority Leaders Charles Halleck and Gerald Ford, Dirksen was the official voice of the Republican Party during most of the 1960s. He discussed politics on television news programs. On several occasions, political cartoonist Herblock depicted Dirksen and Halleck as vaudeville song-and-dance men, wearing identical elaborate costumes and performing an act called The Ev and Charlie Show.

The Chicago Sun-Times once reported that Dirksen had changed his mind 62 times on foreign policy matters, 31 times on military affairs, and 70 times on agricultural policies.

=== Vietnam War ===
As senator, Dirksen reversed his early isolationism to support the internationalism of Republican President Eisenhower and Democratic President John F. Kennedy. He was a leading "hawk" on the issue of the Vietnam War, a position he held well before President Johnson decided to escalate the war.

Dirksen said in February 1964:

First I agree that obviously we cannot retreat from our position in Vietnam. I have been out there three times, once as something of an emissary for then President Eisenhower. I took a good look at it. It is a difficult situation, to say the least. But we are in to the tune of some $350 million. I think the last figure I have seen indicates that we have over 15,500 military out there, ostensibly as advisers and that sort of thing. We are not supposed to have combatant troops, even though we were not signatories to the treaty that was signed at Geneva when finally they got that whole business out of the fire. But we are going to have to muddle through for a while and see what we do. Even though it costs us $1.5 million a day.

As Johnson followed the recommendations and escalated the war, Dirksen gave him strong support in public and inside the Republican caucus. Some Republicans advised him that it would be to the party's advantage to oppose Johnson. Ford commented, "I strongly felt that although I agreed with the goals of the Johnson administration in Vietnam, I vigorously criticized their prosecution of the war. Now, Dirksen never took that same hard-line position that I took."

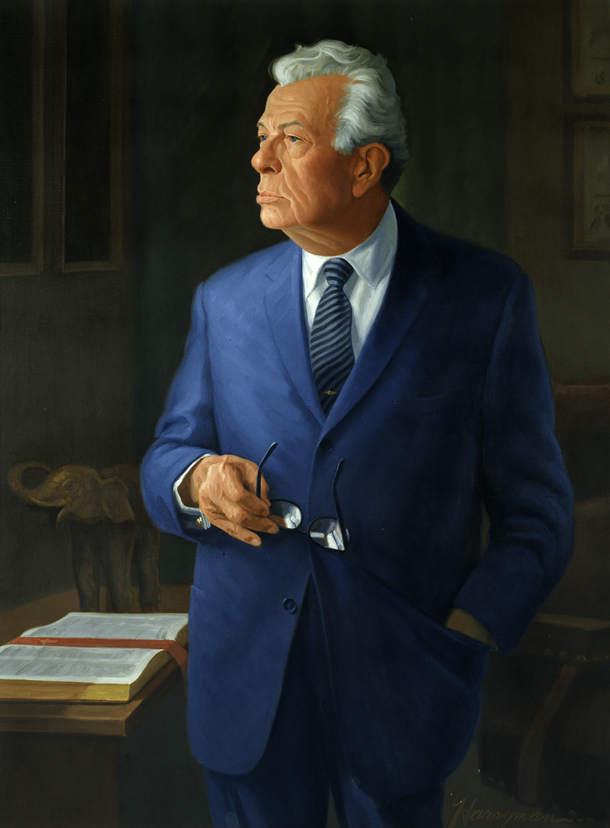
Dirksen played a key role in passage of the 1964 Civil Rights Act.

=== Civil rights legislation ===
Dirksen voted in favor of the Civil Rights Acts of 1957, 1960, 1964, and 1968, as well as the 24th Amendment to the U.S. Constitution, the Voting Rights Act of 1965, and the confirmation of Thurgood Marshall to the U.S. Supreme Court.

In 1964, amid a 54-day filibuster by Southern senators of the Civil Rights Act of 1964, Dirksen, Republican Thomas Kuchel and Democrats Hubert Humphrey and Mike Mansfield introduced a compromise amendment. It weakened the House version on the government's power to regulate the conduct of private business, but it was not so weak it would cause the House to reconsider the legislation. The Department of Justice said the Mansfield-Dirksen Amendment would not prevent effective enforcement. However, Senator Richard Russell Jr. of Georgia refused to allow a vote on the amendment. Finally, Republican Senator Thruston Morton proposed an amendment that guaranteed jury trials in all criminal contempt cases except voting rights. It was approved on June 9, and Humphrey made a deal with three Republicans to substitute it for the Mansfield-Dirksen Amendment in exchange for their supporting cloture on the filibuster. Thus, after 57 days of filibuster, the substitute bill passed in the Senate, and the House–Senate conference committee agreed to adopt the Senate version of the bill.

At that cloture vote, Dirksen said: "Victor Hugo wrote in his diary substantially this sentiment: 'Stronger than all the armies is an idea whose time has come.' The time has come for equality of opportunity in sharing of government, in education, and in employment. It must not be stayed or denied."

On March 22, 1966, Dirksen introduced a constitutional amendment to permit public school administrators providing for organized prayer by students; the introduction was in response to Engel v. Vitale, which struck down the practice. Considered by opponents to violate the principle of separation of church and state, the amendment was defeated in the Senate and gained only 49 affirmative votes, far short of the 67 votes a constitutional amendment needs for passage.

Dirksen was a firm opponent of the doctrine of one man, one vote on the grounds that large cities (such as Chicago in Dirksen's home state of Illinois) could render rural residents of a state powerless in their state governments without some form of concurrent majority. After the Warren Court imposed one-man-one-vote on all state legislative houses in the 1964 case Reynolds v. Sims, he led an ultimately unsuccessful effort to convene an Article V convention for an amendment to the Constitution that would allow for legislative districts of unequal population.

=== Oratory ===
The saying, "A billion here, a billion there, pretty soon, you're talking real money" has been attributed to Dirksen, but there is no direct record of Dirksen saying the remark. Dirksen is also quoted as having said, "The mind is no match with the heart in persuasion; constitutionality is no match with compassion."

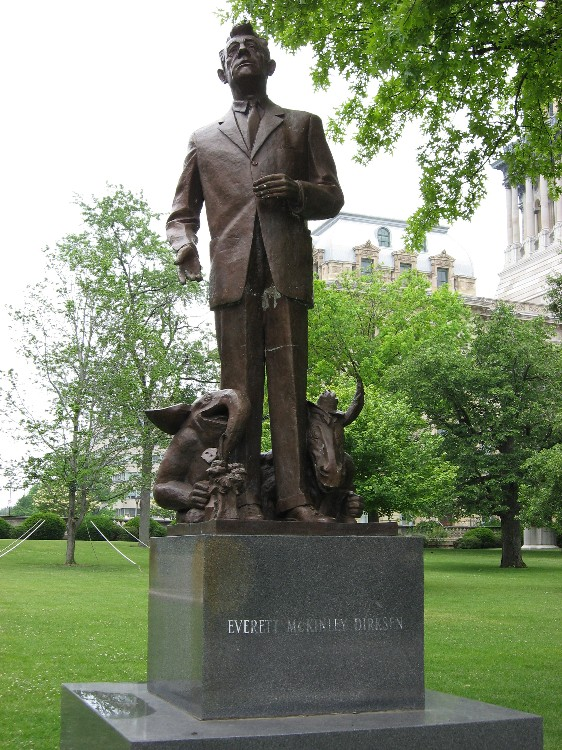
Statue of Senator Dirksen on the grounds of the Illinois State Capitol in Springfield, Illinois. A duplicate is located in Mineral Springs Park in his hometown of Pekin, Illinois.

Dirksen recorded four spoken-word albums. In 1967 his recording "Gallant Men" reached No. 16 on the Billboard 200 and won a Grammy Award for Best Documentary Recording in 1968. On January 7, 1967, Dirksen became the oldest person to reach the Hot 100's top 40, at 71 years, 3 days old, when the single reached No. 33; two weeks later it reached No. 29. In Canada the recording reached No. 76, February 4, 1967. The distinction passed from Dirksen to Moms Mabley with her recording of "Abraham, Martin and John" peaking at No. 35 on July 19, 1969, when she was 75 years 4 months old; then, more than 54 years after that, to Brenda Lee with her recording of "Rockin' Around the Christmas Tree" from 1958 topping the Hot 100 on 9 (and 16) December 2023 when she was 78 years 363 days old.

Recordings of Dirksen's speeches were edited into a mock interview included on the record "Welcome to the LBJ Ranch!" Dirksen was pleased with his inclusion on the parody record and bought many copies to give out as Christmas gifts.

Dirksen made television guest appearances on game and variety shows, such as What's My Line, The Hollywood Palace and The Red Skelton Show. Dirksen made a cameo appearance in the 1969 film The Monitors, a low-budget science-fiction movie in which invading extraterrestrials assert political dominion over the human race. He also appeared in several other movies.

== Personal life ==
Dirksen's widow, Louella, died of cancer on July 16, 1979. Their daughter Joy, the first wife of Senator Howard Baker of Tennessee, died of cancer on April 24, 1993.

Dirksen was a member of the Second Reformed Church, which, although a Dutch Reformed Church, was primarily German (the Reformed Church in America was founded in the 18th century by Dutch immigrants).

Dirksen was a Freemason and was a member of Pekin Lodge No. 29. In 1954, he was grand orator of the Grand Lodge of Illinois. He was honored with the 33rd degree in 1954.

== Death ==
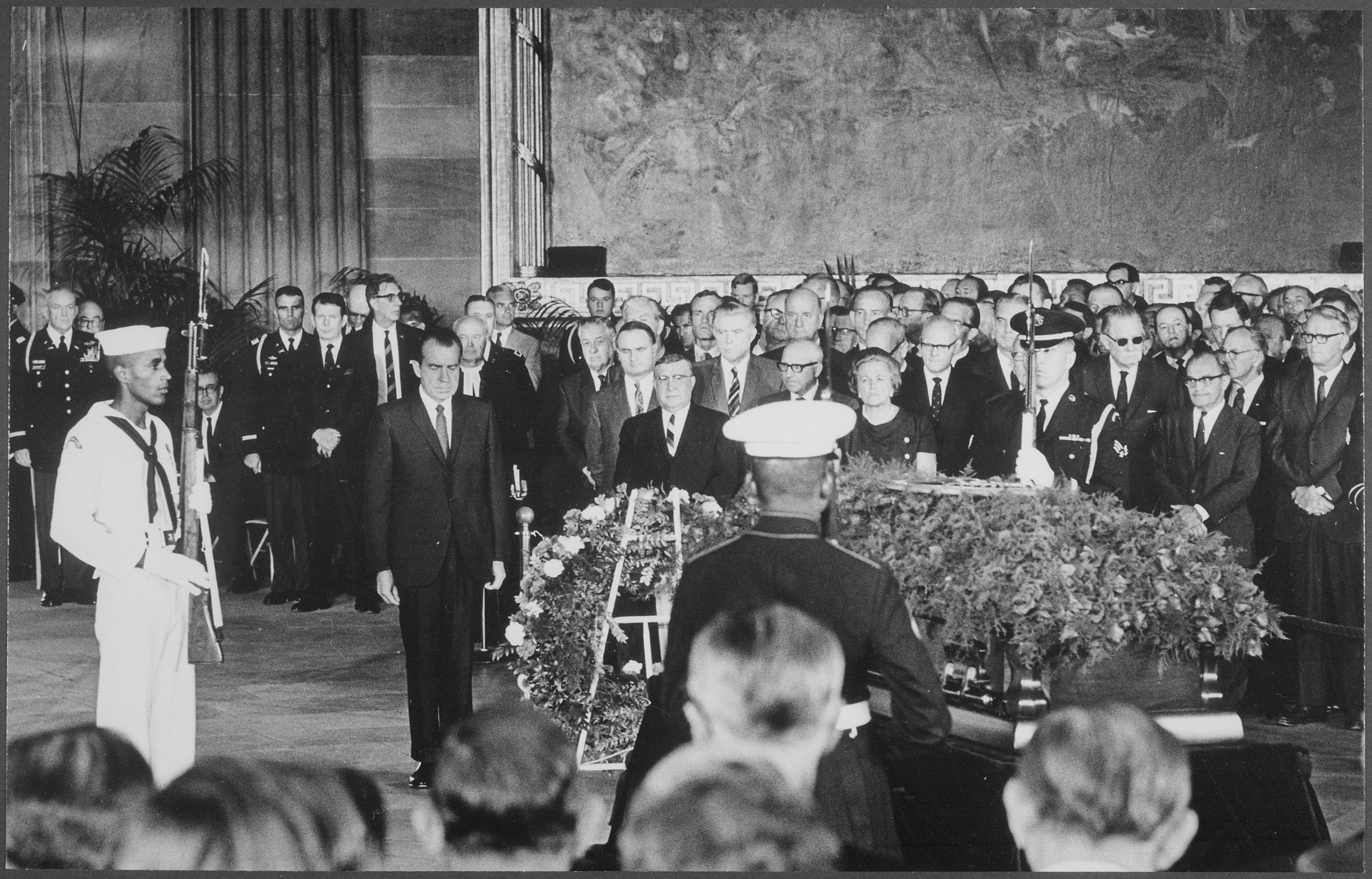
President Richard Nixon paying his last tributes to Senator Dirksen in 1969.

Dirksen was a heavy smoker. In August 1969, chest X-rays disclosed an asymptomatic peripherally located mass in the upper lobe of the right lung. Dirksen entered Walter Reed Army Hospital for surgery, which was undertaken on September 2. A right upper lobectomy removed what proved to be lung cancer (adenocarcinoma). Dirksen initially did well, but progressive complications developed into bronchopneumonia. He suffered a cardiopulmonary arrest and died on September 7, 1969, at age 73.

Dirksen lay in state at the United States Capitol rotunda, followed by burial at Glendale Memorial Gardens in Pekin.

== Legacy and honors ==
Dirksen was known for his fondness for the common marigold. When political discussions became tense, he would lighten the atmosphere by taking up his perennial campaign to have the marigold named the national flower, but it never succeeded. In 1972, his hometown of Pekin started holding an annual Marigold Festival in his memory. It now identifies itself as the "Marigold Capital of the World".

Dirksen was the recipient of honorary degrees (LL.D.) from Hope College, Bradley University, DePaul University, Lincoln Memorial University, Hanover College, Lewis University, and Illinois College.

=== Namesakes ===
Mineral Springs Park, Pekin

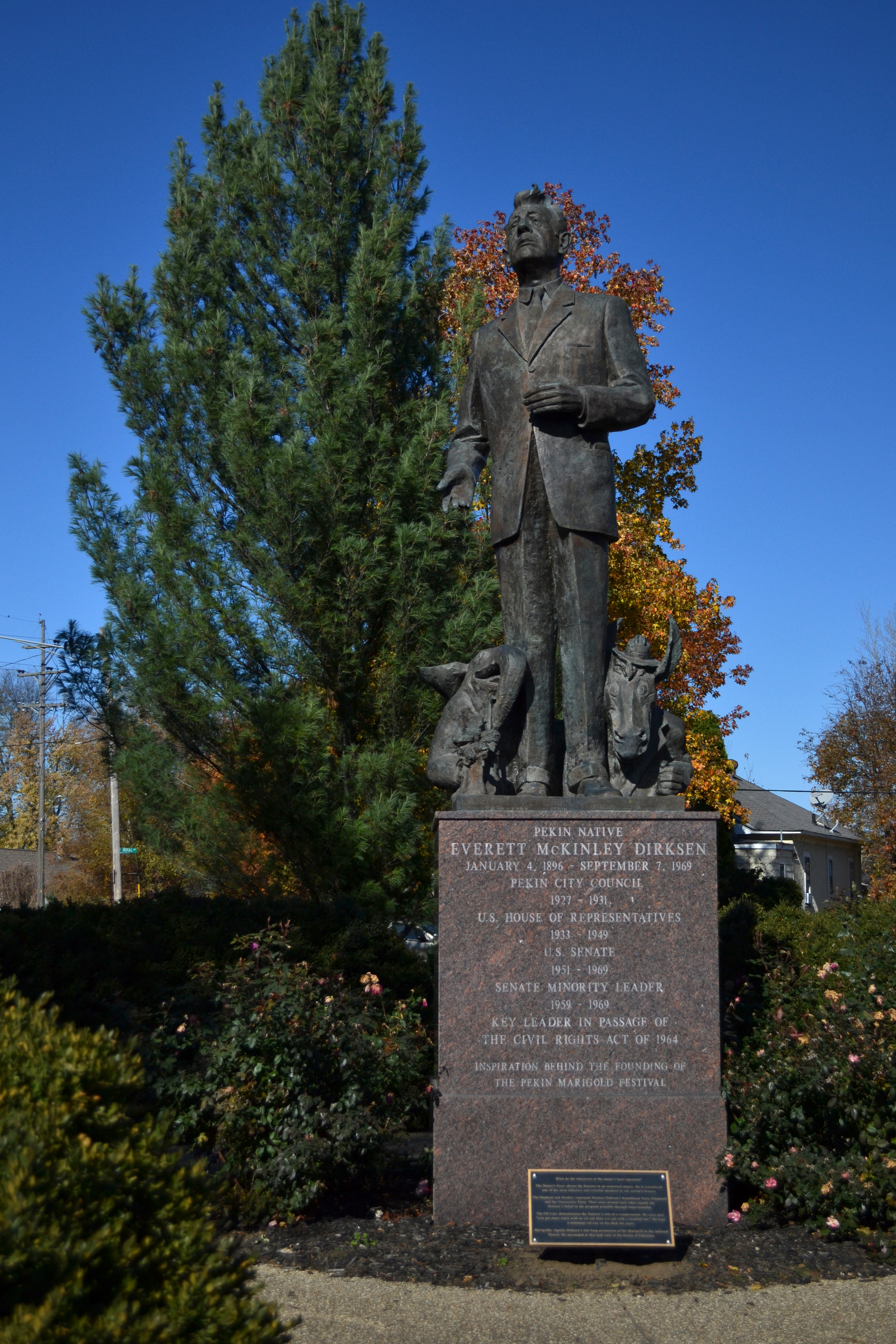
Statue

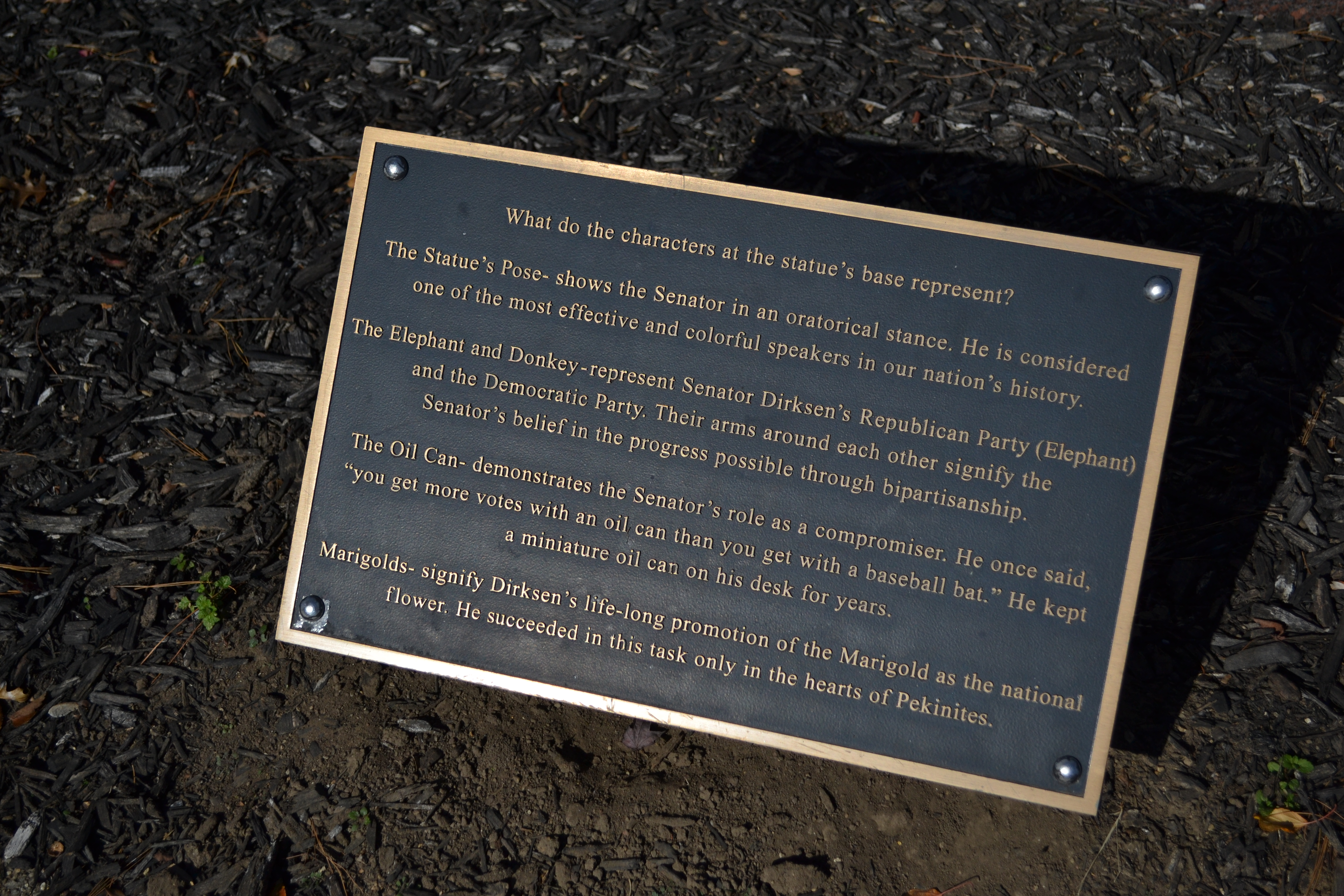
Plaque

- In 1972, one of the Senate's buildings was renamed the Dirksen Senate Office Building in his honor.
- The federal courthouse/building of the United States District Court for the Northern District of Illinois and United States Court of Appeals for the Seventh Circuit in Chicago is also named after him.
- A parkway in Springfield, Illinois (bypass for the historic Route 66 through the capital's center) is named in his honor.
- Dirksen Drive, a road in DeBary, Florida, is named after him. He was a winter resident in DeBary in his later years.
- Dirksen's statue, originally located adjacent to the Illinois State Capitol and is now in Mineral Springs Park in his hometown of Pekin, Illinois, includes two objects iconically identified with the senator: an oil can and a bunch of marigolds.
- Everett Dirksen was inducted as a laureate of The Lincoln Academy of Illinois and awarded the Order of Lincoln (the state's highest honor) by the governor of Illinois in 1966 in the area of government.
- The Everett McKinley Dirksen Elementary School on 8601 West Foster Avenue in Chicago is a magnet school named in his memory along with other public schools in other Illinois townships.
- Dirksen was mentioned in Jeff Greenfield's alternate history book If Kennedy Lived in which in 1964, President John F. Kennedy, having survived his assassination in Dallas the previous year, gathered Senate minority leader Dirksen and others in discussion of selling grain to the Soviet Union.
- The United States Postal Service issued a commemorative stamp in 1981 honoring Dirksen.
- The Everett McKinley Dirksen Award for Distinguished Reporting of Congress has been awarded annually since 1980 by the National Press Foundation (NPF)
- By act of the Illinois General Assembly, the portion of Interstate 74 within Illinois is known as the Dirksen Memorial Highway.

== See also ==
- List of members of the American Legion
- List of members of the United States Congress who died in office (1950–1999)

== Sources ==
=== Books ===
- Dirksen, Everett McKinley (1998). The Education of a Senator. Urbana, IL: University of Illinois Press. ISBN 978-0-252-02414-6.
- Dirksen, Louella; Browning, Norma Lee (1972). The Honorable Mr. Marigold: My Life with Everett Dirksen. New York, NY: Doubleday. "Army of Occupation."
- Hulsey, Byron C. (2000). Everett Dirksen and His Presidents: How a Senate Giant Shaped American Politics. Lawrence, KS: University of Kansas Press. ISBN 978-0-7006-1036-5.
- Illinois Secretary of State (1945). Illinois Blue Book (1945). State of Illinois: Springfield, IL.
- Illinois Secretary of State (1970). Illinois Blue Book (1970). State of Illinois: Springfield, IL.
- Illinois State Historical Society (1983). Illinois Historical Journal. Vol. 76. Springfield, IL: Illinois State Historical Society.
- Kenney, David; Hartley, Robert E. (2003). An Uncertain Tradition: U.S. Senators from Illinois, 1818-2003. Carbondale, IL: Southern Illinois University Press. ISBN 978-0-8093-2549-8.
- MacNeil, Neil (1970). Dirksen: Portrait of a Public Man. New York, NY: World Publishing Company. "saumur."
- U.S. Senate (September 16, 1969). Extensions of Remarks (PDF). Washington, DC: U.S. Government Printing Office.
- Current Biography. New York, NY: H. W. Wilson. 1941.
- U.S. Congress (1969). Official Congressional Directory. Vol. 92. U.S. Government Printing Office: Washington, DC.
- U.S. Senate (1970). Senate Reports. Vol. 1–1. Washington, DC: US Government Printing Office. ISBN 9781345031591.
- United States Senate (1970). Everett McKinley Dirksen, Late a Senator from Illinois. Washington, DC: US Government Printing Office.

=== Newspapers ===
- Kenworthy, E. W. (September 8, 1969). "Dirksen Dead in Capital at 73". The New York Times. p. 1.

== Secondary sources ==
- Hulsey, Byron C. Everett Dirksen and His Presidents: How a Senate Giant Shaped American Politics. University Press of Kansas, 2000.
  - PhD dissertation: "Everett Dirksen and the modern presidents: Truman, Eisenhower, Kennedy, and Johnson" (The University of Texas at Austin; ProQuest Dissertations Publishing, 1998. 9837998).
- Bonfield, Arthur Earl (March 1968). "The Dirksen Amendment and the Article V Convention Process". Michigan Law Review. 66 (5). Michigan Law Review Association, inc.: 949–1000. doi:10.2307/1287188. JSTOR 1287188. S2CID 154226726.
- Kyvig, David E. (Spring 2002). "Everett Dirksen's Constitutional Crusades". Journal of the Illinois State Historical Society. 95 (1): 68–85. JSTOR 40193488.
- Rodriguez; Daniel B. and Barry R. Weingast. "The Positive Political Theory of Legislative History: New Perspectives on the 1964 Civil Rights Act and Its Interpretation". University of Pennsylvania Law Review. Volume: 151. Issue: 4. 2003. pp 1417+.
- Schapsmeier Edward L., and Frederick H. Schapsmeier. Dirksen of Illinois. University of Illinois Press, 1985. online

U.S. House of Representatives
Preceded by William E. Hull	Member of the U.S. House of Representatives from Illinois's 16th congressional district 1933–1949	Succeeded by Leo E. Allen
Preceded by John L. McMillan	Chair of the House District of Columbia Committee; 1947–1949	Succeeded by John L. McMillan
Party political offices
Preceded by Richard J. Lyons	Republican nominee for U.S. Senator from Illinois (Class 3); 1950, 1956, 1962, 1968	Succeeded by Ralph Tyler Smith
Preceded by Owen Brewster	Chair of the National Republican Senatorial Committee; 1953–1955	Succeeded by Barry Goldwater
Preceded by Barry Goldwater	Chair of the National Republican Senatorial Committee; 1957–1959	Succeeded by Andrew F. Schoeppel
Preceded by Leverett Saltonstall	Senate Republican Whip; 1957–1959	Succeeded by Thomas Kuchel
Preceded by William F. Knowland	Senate Republican Leader; 1959–1969	Succeeded by Hugh Scott
First	Response to the State of the Union address 1966, 1967; Served alongside: Gerald Ford	Succeeded by Howard Baker, George H. W. Bush, Peter Dominick, Gerald Ford, Robert Griffin, Thomas Kuchel, Mel Laird, Bob Mathias, George Murphy, Dick Poff, Chuck Percy, Al Quie, Charlotte Reid, Hugh Scott, Bill Steiger, John Tower
U.S. Senate
Preceded by Scott W. Lucas	U.S. Senator (Class 3) from Illinois; 1951–1969; Served alongside: Paul Douglas, Charles H. Percy	Succeeded by Ralph Tyler Smith
Preceded by Leverett Saltonstall	Senate Minority Whip; 1957–1959	Succeeded by Thomas Kuchel
Preceded by William F. Knowland	Senate Minority Leader; 1959–1969	Succeeded by Hugh Scott
New office	Ranking Member of the Senate Aging Committee; 1961–1969	Succeeded by Winston Prouty
Preceded by Alexander Wiley	Ranking Member of the Senate Judiciary Committee; 1963–1969	Succeeded by Roman Hruska
Preceded by B. Everett Jordan	Chair of the Joint Inaugural Ceremonies Committee; 1968–1969	Succeeded by B. Everett Jordan
Honorary titles
Preceded by Thanat Khoman	Grand Marshal of the Rose Parade; 1968	Succeeded by Bob Hope
Preceded by Dwight D. Eisenhower	Persons who have lain in state or honor in the United States Capitol rotunda 1969	Succeeded by J. Edgar Hoover
