= Thomas E. Kluczynski =

American judge

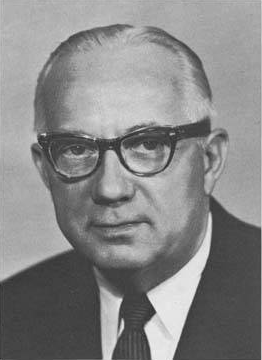

Justice of the Supreme Court of Illinois
- In office 1978–1980
- Preceded by: James A. Dooley
- Succeeded by: Seymour Simon
- In office 1966–1976
- Preceded by: Harry B. Hershey
- Succeeded by: William G. Clark

First District Illinois Appellate Court
- In office 1963–1966

Circuit Court of Cook County
- In office 1950–1963

Personal details
- Born: September 29, 1903 Chicago, Illinois, U.S.
- Died: May 16, 1994 (aged 90) Chicago, Illinois, U.S.
- Relatives: John C. Kluczynski (brother)
- Education: University of Chicago Law School

Thomas E. Kluczynski (September 29, 1903 – May 16, 1994) was an American jurist.

Born in Chicago, Illinois, Kluczynski received his LL.B. degree from the University of Chicago Law School in 1927. He then practiced law until 1945, when he was appointed a commissioner of the Illinois Industrial Commission. In 1950, Governor Adlai Stevenson appointed Klucyznski to circuit court. In 1962, Kluczynski was appointed to the Illinois Appellate Court. From 1966 to 1976 and from 1978 to 1980, Kluczynski served on the Supreme Court of Illinois. Kluczynski died in Chicago, Illinois.
