= 1956 United States Senate election in Illinois =

- November 6, 1956
- Turnout: 81.74%
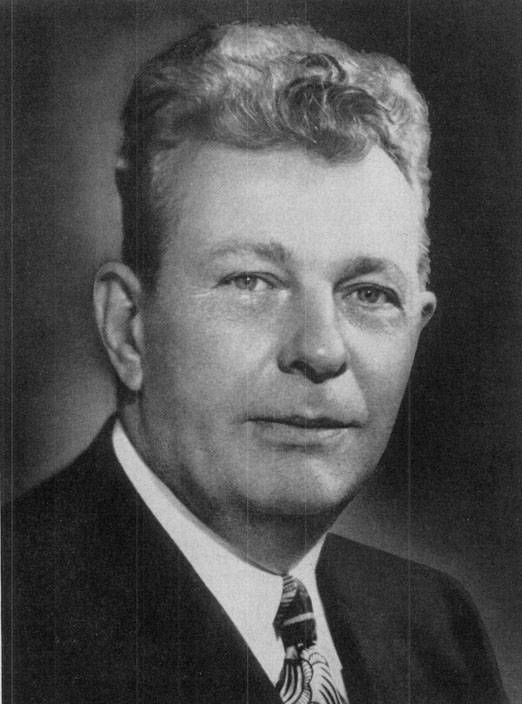

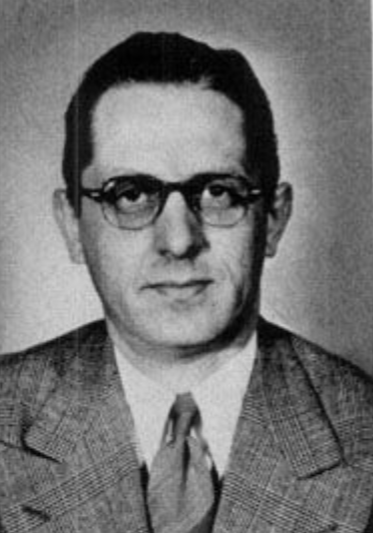
Nominee	Everett M. Dirksen	Richard Stengel
Party	Republican	Democratic
Popular vote	2,307,552	1,949,883
Percentage	54.11%	45.72%
- County results Dirksen: 50–60% 60–70% 70–80% Stengel: 50–60%
Senator before election
Everett M. Dirksen
Republican
Elected Senator
Everett M. Dirksen
Republican

The 1956 United States Senate election in Illinois was held on November 6, 1956 to elect one of Illinois's members to the United States Senate. Incumbent Republican U.S. Senator Everett Dirksen won reelection to a second term.

== Background ==
The primaries and general election coincided with those for federal offices (President and House) and state elections.

Primaries were held on April 10.

Turnout in the primary elections was 26.26%, with a total of 1,307,357 votes cast.

Turnout during the general election was 81.74%, with 4,264,830 votes cast.

== Republican primary ==
=== Candidates ===
- Everett Dirksen, incumbent U.S. senator since 1951

=== Results ===
Republican primary
Party	Candidate	Votes	%
Republican	Everett Dirksen (incumbent)	686,268	100
Write-in		34	0.01
Total votes		686,302	100

== Democratic primary ==
=== Candidates ===
- Richard Stengel, state representative from Rock Island

==== Declined ====
- James Gray, state senator from East St. Louis
- Scott W. Lucas, former U.S. senator
- Roy E. Yung, former director of the Illinois Department of Agriculture

=== Results ===
The Democratic Party nominated Richard Stengel, who ran unopposed in the primary.

Democratic primary
Party	Candidate	Votes	%
Democratic	Richard Stengel	621,005	99.99
Write-in		50	0.01
Total votes		621,055	100

== General election ==
=== Candidates ===
- Everett Dirksen, incumbent U.S. senator since 1951 (Republican)
- Louis Fisher, activist and perennial candidate (Socialist Labor)
- Richard Stengel, state representative from Rock Island (Democratic)

=== Results ===
Dirksen carried 88 of the state's 102 counties. Among the 88 counties that Dirksen won was the state's most populous county, Cook County, in which Dirksen won with 51.13% to Stengel's 48.63%. Despite losing in Cook County, Stengel performed better in the county than he did in the cumulative vote of the remaining 101 counties In the cumulative vote of the state's other 101 counties, Dirksen won 57.32% to Stengel's 42.58%. 51.97% of the votes cast in the election were from Cook County.

While he lost the overall vote in Cook County as a whole, in Cook County's principal city, Chicago (where 37.79% of all votes cast in the election were from), Stengel won 54.33% of the vote to Dirksen's 45.37%

General election
Party	Candidate	Votes	%
Republican	Everett McKinley Dirksen (incumbent)	2,307,552	54.11
Democratic	Richard Stengel	1,949,883	45.72
Socialist Labor	Louis Fisher	7,587	0.18
Write-in		8	0.00
Total votes		4,264,830	100

== See also ==
- 1956 United States Senate elections
