= 1968 United States Senate election in Illinois =

- November 5, 1968
- Turnout: 78.39%
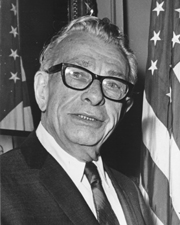

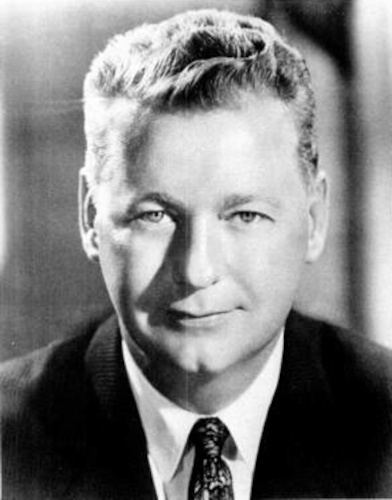
Nominee	Everett M. Dirksen	William G. Clark
Party	Republican	Democratic
Popular vote	2,358,947	2,073,242
Percentage	53.01%	46.59%
- County results Dirksen: 50–60% 60–70% 70–80% Clark: 50–60%
Senator before election
Everett M. Dirksen
Republican
Elected Senator
Everett M. Dirksen
Republican

The 1968 United States Senate election in Illinois was held on November 5, 1968 to elect one of Illinois's members to the United States Senate. Incumbent Republican U.S. Senator and Minority Leader Everett Dirksen won re-election to his fourth term.

== Background ==
The primaries and general election coincided with those for other federal (United States president and House) and those for state elections.

Primaries were held on June 11.

Turnout in the primary elections was 23.90%, with a total of 1,303,375 votes cast.

Turnout during the general election was 78.39%, with 4,449,757 votes cast.

== Democratic primary ==
Illinois Attorney General William G. Clark won the Democratic primary, running unopposed.

Democratic primary
Party	Candidate	Votes	%
Democratic	William G. Clark	627,361	99.97
Write-in		218	0.04
Total votes		627,579	100

== Republican primary ==
Incumbent U.S. Senator, and Senate Minority Leader, Everett M. Dirksen, won renomination over Roy C. Johnson.

Republican primary
Party	Candidate	Votes	%
Republican	Everett McKinley Dirksen (incumbent)	622,710	92.15
Republican	Roy C. Johnson	53,069	7.85
Write-in		17	0.00
Total votes		675,796	100

== General election ==
=== Results ===
Dirksen carried 99 of the state's 102 counties. Clark, however, carried the state's most populous county, Cook County, taking 54.07% of the vote, to Dirksen's 45.52%. Since Cook County was home to 50.65% of the votes cast in the election, the final result of the election was close, despite Dirksen winning a landslide 60.70% of the vote to Clark's 38.92% in the other 101 counties of the state.

Additionally, in Cook County's principal city, Chicago (from which 31.02% of all statewide ballots were cast), Clark won 63.90% of the vote to Dirksen's 35.58%. Clark's majority in Chicago and Cook County was insufficient to roll back Dirksen's large majorities in the Chicago suburbs and Downstate.

United States Senate election in Illinois, 1968
Party	Candidate	Votes	%
Republican	Everett M. Dirksen (incumbent)	2,358,947	53.01
Democratic	William G. Clark	2,073,242	46.59
Socialist Labor	Louis Fisher	17,542	0.39
Write-in		26	0.00
Total votes		4,449,757	100.00

== See also ==
- United States Senate elections, 1968
