= James A. Dooley =

American judge

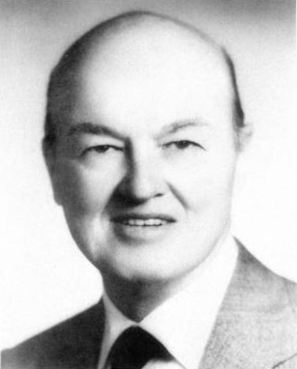
Dooley's official photograph, c. 1977.

James A. Dooley (August 7, 1914 – March 5, 1978) was an American jurist.

== Early life and education ==
Born in Chicago, Illinois, Dooley received his bachelor's degree from Loyola University Chicago in 1935 and his law degree from Loyola University Chicago School of Law in 1937. He then practiced law and was a Democrat.

== Career ==
Dooley served in the Illinois Supreme Court from 1976 until his death in 1978. Dooley died suddenly at his winter home in Bal Harbour, Florida as he was getting ready to return for the resumption of the Illinois Supreme Court schedule.
