= 47th Illinois General Assembly =

Illinois state legislature

←	46th	48th	→
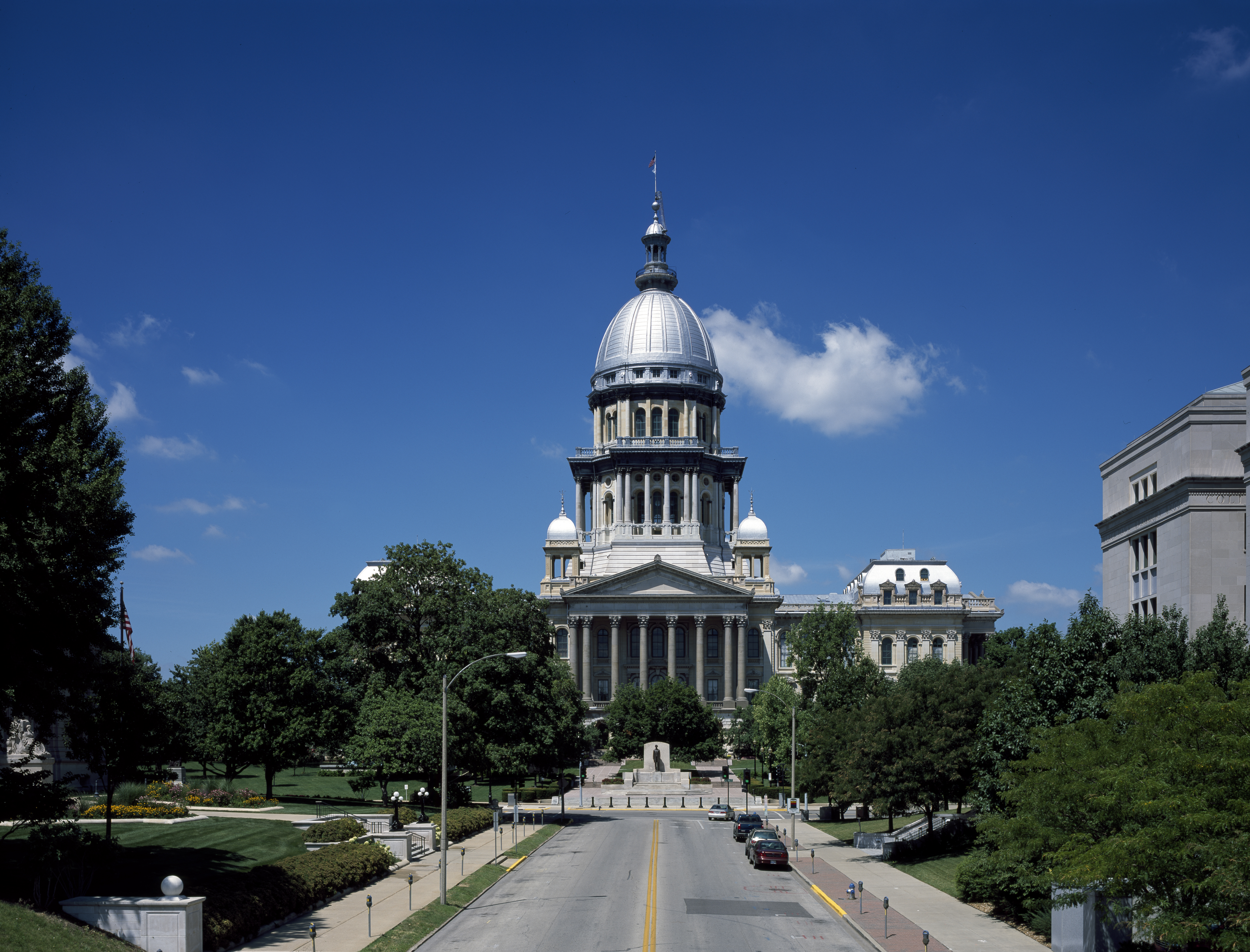
- The Illinois State Capitol

Overview
- Meeting place: Springfield, Illinois
- Term: 1911 – 1913
- Election: 1910

Illinois Senate
- President: John G. Oglesby, Republican
- President pro tempore: Henry M. Dunlap, Republican

Illinois House of Representatives
- Speaker: Charles A. Adkins, Republican

The 47th Illinois General Assembly met from 1911 to 1913. John G. Oglesby of Decatur was the Lieutenant Governor of Illinois and thus ex officio President of the Senate. (Note: This arrangement was discontinued with the adoption of the current Constitution of Illinois in 1970, effective 1973.) Henry M. Dunlap was President pro tempore of the Senate. Charles A. Adkins of Bement was the Speaker of the House of Representatives.

== Districts ==
Illinois was divided into 51 districts, each of which elected one Senator and three Representatives. Districts were last reapportioned in 1901 and would not be reapportioned again until 1947.

The counties of each district were as follows:

- 1st, 2nd, 3rd, 4th, 5th, 6th, 7th, 9th, 11th, 13th, 15th, 17th, 19th, 21st, 23rd, 25th, 27th, 29th, and 31st: Parts of Cook
- 8th: Lake, McHenry, and Boone
- 10th: Ogle and Winnebago
- 12th: Stephenson, Jo Daviess, and Carroll
- 14th: Kane and Kendall
- 16th: Marshall, Putnam, Livingston, and Woodford
- 18th: Peoria
- 20th: Grundy, Kankakee, and Iroquois
- 22nd: Vermillion and Edgar
- 24th: Champaign, Piatt, and Moultrie
- 26th: Ford and McLean
- 28th: DeWitt, Logan, and Macon
- 30th: Tazewell, Mason, Menard, Cass, Schuyler, and Brown
- 32nd: Hancock, McDonough, and Warren
- 33rd: Henderson, Mercer, and Rock Island
- 34th: Douglas, Coles, and Clark
- 35th: Whiteside, Lee, and DeKalb
- 36th: Adams, Pike, Calhoun, and Scott
- 37th: Henry, Stark, and Bureau
- 38th: Greene, Jersey, Macoupin, and Montgomery
- 39th: LaSalle
- 40th: Christian, Shelby, Cumberland, and Fayette
- 41st: DuPage and Will
- 42nd: Clinton, Marion, Clay, and Effingham
- 43rd: Knox and Fulton
- 44th: Jackson, Perry, Washington, Randolph, and Monroe
- 45th: Morgan and Sangamon
- 46th: Jefferson, Wayne, Richland, and Jasper
- 47th: Madison and Bond
- 48th: Hardin, Gallatin, White, Edwards, Wabash, Lawrence, and Crawford
- 49th: St. Clair
- 50th: Hamilton, Saline, Pope, Johnson, and Massac
- 51st: Franklin, Williamson, Union, Pulaski, and Alexander

== Senate ==
District	Image	Senator	Party	First elected to the Senate	Notes
1st		Francis P. Brady	Republican	1910	Elected to the House in 1904, 1906, and 1910
2nd		Lewis C. Ball	Republican	1908	
3rd		Samuel A. Ettelson	Republican	1906	
4th		Al F. Gorman	Democratic	1908	
5th		Walter Clyde Jones	Republican	1906	
6th		William M. Brown	Republican	1904	
7th		William H. MacLean	Republican	1910	
8th		Albert J. Olson	Republican	1908	
9th		Patrick J. Carroll	Democratic	1910	
10th		Henry Andrus	Republican	1900	
11th		Carl Lundberg	Republican	1902	
12th		John C. McKenzie	Republican	1900	Resigned May 22, 1911
13th		Albert C. Clark	Republican	1902	
14th		Thomas B. Stewart			
15th		Edward J. Forst			
16th		Ira M. Lish			
17th		Edward J. Glackin			
18th		John Dailey			
19th		John T. Denvir			
20th		Edward C. Curtis			
21st		John E. Madigan			
22nd		Martin B. Bailey			
23rd		Niels Juul			
24th		Henry M. Dunlap			
25th		Johan Waage			
26th		Frank H. Funk			
27th		John Broderick			
28th		James A. Henson			
29th		John M. O'Connor			
30th		Walter I. Manny			
31st		Willett H. Cornwell			
32nd		James F. Gibson			
33rd		Frank A. Landee			
34th		Stanton C. Pemberton			
35th		John H. Gray			
36th		Campbell S. Hearn			
37th		H. S. Magill Jr.			
38th		Frank W. Burton			
39th		Henry W. Johnson			
40th		F. J. Tossey			
41st		Richard J. Barr			
42nd		Erastus D. Telford			
43rd		Charles F. Hurburgh			
44th		Robert J. McElvain			
45th		Logan Hay			
46th		Albert E. Isley			
47th		Edmond Beall			
48th		J. A. Womack			
49th		John M. Chamberlin			
50th		W. O. Potter			
51st		Douglas W. Helm			

=== House ===
District	Image	Representative	Party	First elected to the House	Notes

== See also ==
- List of Illinois state legislatures

== Bibliography ==
- James Langland, M.A. (1920). The Chicago Daily News Almanac and Year-Book for 1921. Chicago, IL: The Chicago Daily News Company.
