= List of speakers of the Illinois House of Representatives =

The Speaker of the Illinois House of Representatives is seventh (behind the Lieutenant Governor, Attorney General, Secretary of State, Comptroller, Treasurer, and President of the Senate, respectively) in the line of succession to the office of Governor of Illinois.

== List of speakers ==
This is a complete list of the Speakers of the Illinois House of Representatives as of January 2021. Each was chosen since the Illinois General Assembly's first session in 1818.

The colors indicate the political party affiliation of each speaker.

Party color key
Democratic-Republican
Democratic
Republican
Independent

#	Speaker	Party	General Assembly	Date of election
1	John Messinger	Democratic-Republican	1st	October 5, 1818
2	John McLean	Democratic-Republican	2nd	December 4, 1820
3	William M. Alexander	Democratic-Republican	3rd	December 2, 1822
4	Thomas Mather	Democratic-Republican	4th	November 15, 1824
5	David Blackwell	Democratic	4th	January 2, 1826
6	John McLean	Democratic	5th	December 4, 1826
6	John McLean	Democratic	6th	December 4, 1826
7	William Lee D. Ewing	Democratic	7th	December 6, 1830
8	Alexander M. Jenkins	Democratic	8th	December 6, 1832
9	James Semple	Democratic	9th	December 1, 1834
9	James Semple	Democratic	10th	December 1, 1834
10	William Lee D. Ewing	Democratic	11th	December 3, 1838
10	William Lee D. Ewing	Democratic	12th	December 3, 1838
11	Samuel Hackleton	Democratic	13th	December 5, 1842
12	William Alexander Richardson	Democratic	14th	December 2, 1844
13	Newton Cloud	Democratic	15th	December 7, 1846
14	Zadok Casey	Democratic	16th	January 1, 1849
15	Sidney Breese	Democratic	17th	January 6, 1851
16	John Reynolds	Democratic	18th	January 3, 1853
17	Thomas J. Turner	Anti-Nebraska Democratic	19th	January 1, 1855
18	Samuel Holmes	Democratic	20th	January 5, 1857
19	William Ralls Morrison	Democratic	21st	January 3, 1859
20	Shelby Moore Cullom	Republican	22nd	January 7, 1861
21	Samuel A. Buckmaster	Democratic	23rd	January 5, 1863
22	Allen C. Fuller	Republican	24th	January 2, 1865
23	Franklin Corwin	Republican	25th	January 7, 1867
23	Franklin Corwin	Republican	26th	January 7, 1867
24	William M. Smith	Republican	27th	January 4, 1871
25	Shelby Moore Cullom	Republican	28th	January 8, 1873
26	Elijah M. Haines	Independent	29th	January 6, 1875
27	James Shaw	Republican	30th	January 3, 1877
28	William A. James	Republican	31st	January 8, 1879
29	Horace H. Thomas	Republican	32nd	January 5, 1881
30	Lorin C. Collins	Republican	33rd	January 3, 1883
31	Elijah M. Haines	Independent	34th	January 29, 1885
32	William F. Calhoun	Republican	35th	January 5, 1887
33	Asa C. Matthews	Republican	36th	January 9, 1889
34	James H. Miller	Republican	36th	May 10, 1889
35	William Granville Cochran	Republican	36th	July 23, 1890
36	Clayton E. Crafts	Democratic	37th	January 7, 1891
36	Clayton E. Crafts	Democratic	38th	January 7, 1891
37	John Meyer	Republican	39th	January 9, 1895
38	William Granville Cochran	Republican	39th	July 10, 1895
39	Edward C. Curtis	Republican	40th	January 6, 1897
40	Lawrence Y. Sherman	Republican	41st	January 4, 1899
40	Lawrence Y. Sherman	Republican	42nd	January 4, 1899
41	John Henry Miller	Republican	43rd	January 7, 1903
42	Edward D. Shurtleff	Republican	44th	January 4, 1905
42	Edward D. Shurtleff	Republican	45th	January 4, 1905
42	Edward D. Shurtleff	Republican	46th	January 4, 1905
43	Charles A. Adkins	Republican	47th	January 4, 1911
44	William Michael McKinley	Democratic	48th	January 29, 1913
45	David E. Shanahan	Republican	49th	February 17, 1915
45	David E. Shanahan	Republican	50th	February 17, 1915
45	David E. Shanahan	Republican	51st	February 17, 1915
46	Gotthard A. Dahlberg	Republican	52nd	January 5, 1921
47	David E. Shanahan	Republican	53rd	January 3, 1923
48	Robert Scholes	Republican	54th	January 7, 1925
48	Robert Scholes	Republican	55th	January 7, 1925
49	David E. Shanahan	Republican	56th	January 9, 1929
49	David E. Shanahan	Republican	57th	January 9, 1929
50	Arthur Roe	Democratic	58th	January 4, 1933
51	John P. Devine	Democratic	59th	January 9, 1935
52	Louie E. Lewis	Democratic	60th	January 6, 1937
53	Hugh W. Cross	Republican	61st	January 3, 1939
54	Elmer Jacob Schnackenberg	Republican	62nd	January 8, 1941
54	Elmer Jacob Schnackenberg	Republican	63rd	January 8, 1941
55	Hugh Green	Republican	64th	January 3, 1945
55	Hugh Green	Republican	65th	January 3, 1945
56	Paul Powell	Democratic	66th	January 10, 1949
57	Warren L. Wood	Republican	67th	January 8, 1951
57	Warren L. Wood	Republican	68th	January 8, 1951
57	Warren L. Wood	Republican	69th	January 8, 1951
57	Warren L. Wood	Republican	70th	January 8, 1951
58	Paul Powell	Democratic	71st	January 7, 1959
58	Paul Powell	Democratic	72nd	January 7, 1959
59	John W. Lewis, Jr.	Republican	73rd	January 9, 1963
60	John Touhy	Democratic	74th	January 6, 1965
61	Ralph T. Smith	Republican	75th	January 4, 1967
61	Ralph T. Smith	Republican	76th	January 4, 1967
62	Jack E. Walker	Republican	76th	October 14, 1969
63	W. Robert Blair	Republican	77th	January 6, 1971
63	W. Robert Blair	Republican	78th	January 6, 1971
64	William A. Redmond	Democratic	79th	January 21, 1975
64	William A. Redmond	Democratic	80th	January 21, 1975
64	William A. Redmond	Democratic	81st	January 21, 1975
65	George H. Ryan	Republican	82nd	January 14, 1981
66	Arthur A. Telcser	Republican	82nd	January 10, 1983
67	Michael J. Madigan	Democratic	83rd	January 12, 1983
67	Michael J. Madigan	Democratic	84th	January 12, 1983
67	Michael J. Madigan	Democratic	85th	January 12, 1983
67	Michael J. Madigan	Democratic	86th	January 12, 1983
67	Michael J. Madigan	Democratic	87th	January 12, 1983
67	Michael J. Madigan	Democratic	88th	January 12, 1983
68	Lee A. Daniels	Republican	89th	January 9, 1995
69	Michael J. Madigan	Democratic	90th	January 8, 1997
69	Michael J. Madigan	Democratic	91st	January 8, 1997
69	Michael J. Madigan	Democratic	92nd	January 8, 1997
69	Michael J. Madigan	Democratic	93rd	January 8, 1997
69	Michael J. Madigan	Democratic	94th	January 8, 1997
69	Michael J. Madigan	Democratic	95th	January 8, 1997
69	Michael J. Madigan	Democratic	96th	January 8, 1997
69	Michael J. Madigan	Democratic	97th	January 8, 1997
69	Michael J. Madigan	Democratic	98th	January 8, 1997
69	Michael J. Madigan	Democratic	99th	January 8, 1997
69	Michael J. Madigan	Democratic	100th	January 8, 1997
69	Michael J. Madigan	Democratic	101st	January 8, 1997
70	Emanuel Chris Welch	Democratic	102nd	January 13, 2021
70	Emanuel Chris Welch	Democratic	103rd	January 13, 2021
70	Emanuel Chris Welch	Democratic	104th	January 13, 2021

== See also ==
- List of Illinois state legislatures
