= William Calhoun =

William Calhoun or Bill Calhoun may also refer to:

- Haystack Calhoun (1934–1989), a wrestler
- WC (rapper) (William L. Calhoun, Jr., born 1970), West Coast rapper
- William Lowndes Calhoun (1837–1908), Mayor of Atlanta
- William B. Calhoun (1796–1865), U.S. Representative from Massachusetts
- Bill Calhoun (basketball) (1927–2024), American professional basketball player
- Bill Calhoun (baseball) (1890–1955), American professional baseball player
- William F. Calhoun, state legislator in Illinois
- William Henry Calhoun, American silversmith
- William L. Calhoun (admiral) (1884–1963), U.S. Navy
- William J. Calhoun (1848–1916), American attorney, government official, and friend of President William McKinley
- Will Calhoun (born 1964), American drummer
- Bill Calhoun, a secondary lead character in the Broadway musical Kiss Me, Kate
- Bill Calhoun (sprinter), winner of the 1967 4 × 440 yard relay at the NCAA Division I Indoor Track and Field Championships
