= Marengo Township =

Marengo Township may refer to the following places in the United States:

- Marengo Township, McHenry County, Illinois
- Marengo Township, Iowa County, Iowa
- Marengo Township, Michigan
