= Samuel Holmes =

Samuel Holmes may refer to:

- Samuel Jackson Holmes (1868–1964), American zoologist and eugenicist
- Samuel Holmes (politician), speaker of the Illinois House of Representatives during the mid-1850s
- Sam Holmes (baseball) (1915–2010), American baseball player
- Sam Holmes (sailor), American YouTuber and sailor

== See also ==
- Samuel Holmes House, Highland Park, Illinois
