= Clayton E. Crafts =

American lawyer and politician

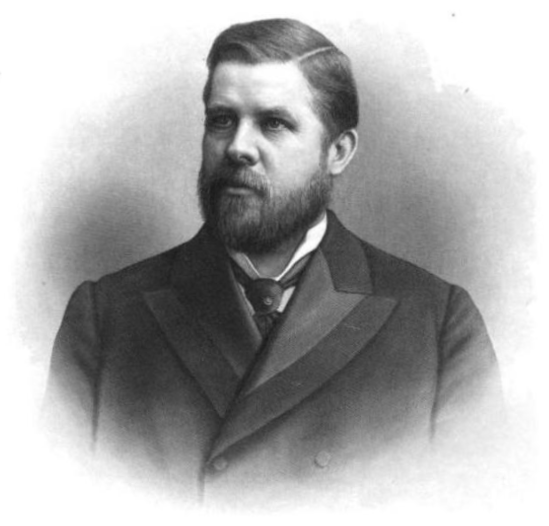

Speaker of the Illinois House of Representatives
- In office January 7, 1891 – January 9, 1895
- Preceded by: William Granville Cochran
- Succeeded by: John Meyer

Minority Leader of the Illinois House of Representatives
- In office January 9, 1895 – January 6, 1897
- Preceded by: Edgar C. Hawley

Member of the Illinois House of Representatives
- In office 1901–1904
- In office 1887–1897

Personal details
- Born: Clayton Edward Crafts; July 8, 1848 Auburn Township, Geauga County, Ohio
- Died: August 26, 1920 (aged 72) Chicago, Illinois
- Resting place: Forest Home Cemetery
- Party: Democratic
- Occupation: Lawyer, politician

Clayton Edward Crafts (July 8, 1848 – August 26, 1920) was an American lawyer and politician.

== Biography ==
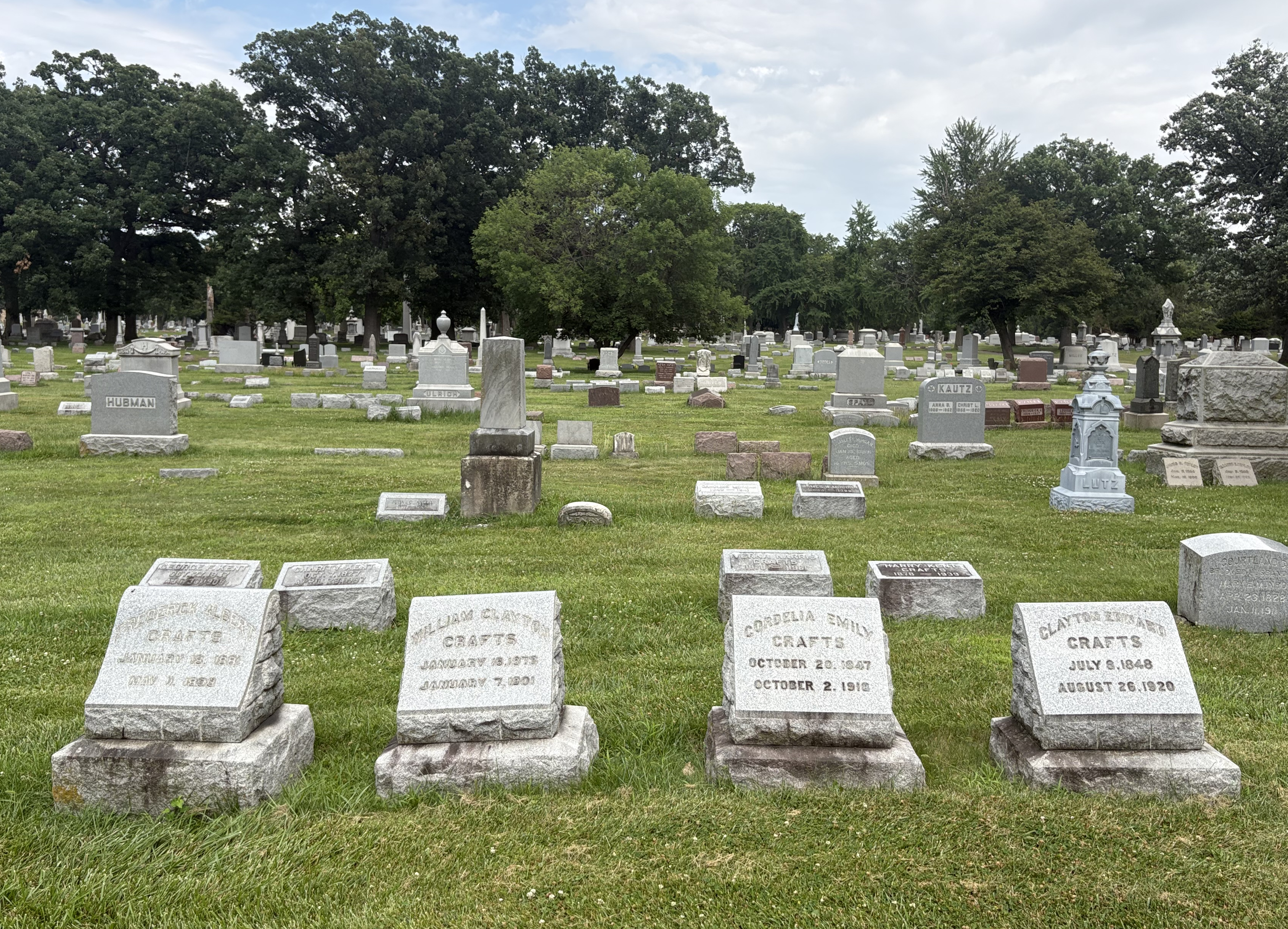
Crafts's grave (rightmost) at Forest Home Cemetery

Born in Auburn Township, Geauga County, Ohio, Crafts went to Hiram College and the Union College of Law, Cleveland, Ohio. He practiced law in Cleveland, Ohio and Watkins Glen, New York and then in 1869, moved to Chicago, Illinois where he continue to practice law. Crafts was involved with the Democratic Party. From 1887 to 1897 and from 1901 to 1904, Crafts served in the Illinois House of Representatives and was the Speaker of the House. He was a member of the "Big Four," a group of Illinois legislators known for their corporate ties.

He died at his home in Chicago on August 26, 1920, and was buried at Forest Home Cemetery in Forest Park.
