= Elijah Haines =

American politician and author

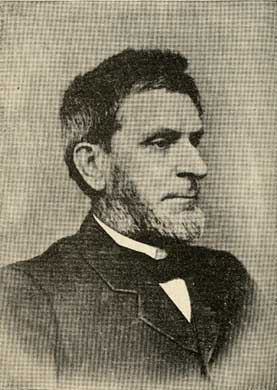

Speaker of the Illinois House of Representatives
- In office January 29, 1885 – January 5, 1887
- Preceded by: Lorin C. Collins
- Succeeded by: William F. Calhoun
- In office January 6, 1875 – January 3, 1877
- Preceded by: Shelby Moore Cullom
- Succeeded by: James Shaw

Personal details
- Born: Ejliah Middlebrook Haines; April 21, 1822 Oneida County, New York
- Died: April 25, 1889 (aged 67)

Ejliah Middlebrook Haines (April 21, 1822 – April 25, 1889) was an American politician and author. Born in New York, he came to Illinois with his brother John Charles and established one of the first villages in Lake County, Hainesville. Admitted to the bar in 1851, Haines wrote several notable law books. He was first elected to the Illinois House of Representatives in 1858 and served eight intermittent terms, including two as Speaker of the House. Staunchly independent after 1865, Haines was a leader in the movement against the Republican Party in Illinois before his death in 1889.

== Biography ==
Elijah Middlebrook Haines was born on April 21, 1822, in Oneida County, New York. When he was twelve years old, he moved west with his brother John Charles and settled in Lake County, Illinois. In 1846, he surveyed, platted, and named the town of Hainesville. Haines taught school in nearby Waukegan while he studied law; he was admitted to the bar in 1851. He opened a law office in and starting writing about the subject. His first major work, A Compilation of the Laws of Illinois relating to Township Organization was first published in 1855. He also wrote similar books on other states, including Wisconsin (1858), Michigan (1860) and Minnesota (1869). In 1868, he published A Practical Treatise on the Powers and Duties of Justices of the Peace and Constables in the State of Illinois. The two Illinois books became popular among those studying law in the state.

Early in his life, Haines voted with the Democratic Party. However, in 1859, he left the party over the slavery issue and joined the Republican Party. Haines was elected to the Illinois House of Representatives in 1858 and was re-elected to two more two-year terms. However, he increasingly found himself at odds with party ideals. In 1865, he renounced the Republican Party and aligned himself with the Andrew Johnson movement. Haines became active in the anti-monopoly movement, attempting to break up large chains of warehouses.

Still a popular figure in the state, Haines was elected as an independent delegate to the 1870 Illinois constitutional convention. There, Haines galvanized opposition to the Republican Party, allowing minority parties to influence the legislation as a combined majority. These actions led to his re-election to the Illinois House in 1870 and again in 1874. During this latter term, Haines was named Speaker of the House. He served again as a standard member of the House in 1882, then was again named Speaker in 1884, serving until 1886. During this term, he presided over the contentious 1885 US Senate election. He was once again elected to the House in 1888, but died on April 25, 1889, before his term was complete. He was buried in Cranberry Lake Cemetery.

== Bibliography ==
- Historical and Statistical Sketches of Lake County, State of Illinois (1852)
- A Compilation of the Laws of Illinois relating to Township Organization (1855)
- Laws of Wisconsin Concerning the Organization and Government of Towns (1858)
- Laws of Michigan Concerning the Organization and Government of Townships (1860)
- A Practical Treatise on the Powers and Duties of Justices of the Peace and Constables in the State of Illinois (1868)
- A Complete Compilation of the Laws of Minnesota relating to Township Organization and the Duties of Town Officers (1869)
- The American Indian (Uh-nish-in-na-ba) (1888)
