= William M. Brown =

William M. Brown may refer to:

- William M. Brown (Pennsylvania politician) (1850–1915), Republican political official from Pennsylvania
- William Brown (British Columbia politician) (1838–1915), English-born political figure in British Columbia
- William M. Brown (businessman), chief executive officer of 3M
- William Brown (baseball) (1866–1897), Major League Baseball player
- William Montgomery Brown (1855–1937), Episcopal clergyman and author
- William Brown (headmaster) (1914–2005), headmaster of King's Ely, and of Bedford School
- William M. Brown (Illinois politician), Illinois state senator
- William Mason Brown (1828–1898), American artist
