= John Denvir =

John Denvir may refer to:

- John Denvir (American football), American football guard
- John Denvir (soldier), New Zealand Army officer
- John T. Denvir, American politician in Illinois and writer about checkers

== See also ==
- John Denver, American singer-songwriter
