= WXMR-LP =

- Marengo, Illinois; United States
- Frequency: 94.3 MHz
- Branding: Marengo Community Radio

Programming
- Format: Community radio

Ownership
- Owner: Marril Corsen Media Project, Ltd.

History
- First air date: 2016

Technical information
- Licensing authority: FCC
- Facility ID: 193156
- Class: L1
- ERP: 100 watts
- HAAT: 9 meters (30 ft)
- Transmitter coordinates: 42°14′38″N 88°35′15.10″W

Links
- Public license information: LMS
- Webcast: Listen live
- Website: wxmr943.com

WXMR-LP (94.3 FM) is a radio station licensed to serve the community of Marengo, Illinois. The station is owned by Marril Corsen Media Project, Ltd. It airs a community radio format.

The station was assigned the WXMR-LP call letters by the Federal Communications Commission on January 22, 2014.
