= Marengo, Illinois =

Marengo
- City
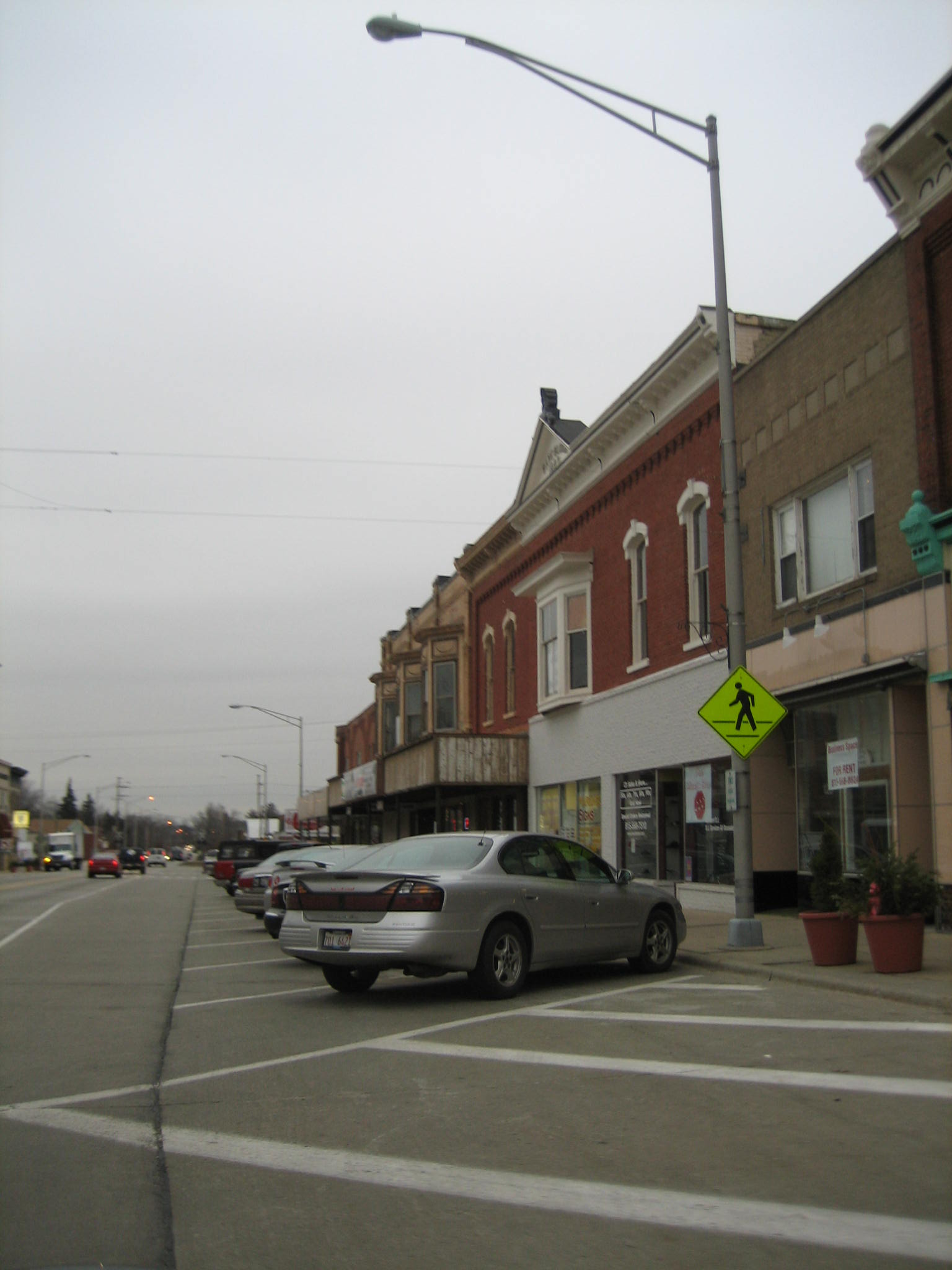
- Buildings in downtown Marengo.

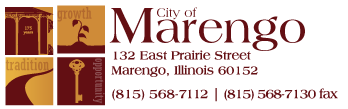
- Logo
- Motto: Home of Settlers Days
- Location of Marengo in McHenry County, Illinois.
- Coordinates: city_region:US-IL 42°15′03″N 88°36′50″W
- Country: United States
- State: Illinois
- County: McHenry
- Township: Marengo, Seneca, Coral, Riley
- Founded: 1835

Area
  - Total: 8.90 sq mi (23.06 km^{2})
  - Land: 8.90 sq mi (23.06 km^{2})
  - Water: 0 sq mi (0.00 km^{2})
- Elevation: 804 ft (245 m)

Population (2020)
  - Total: 7,568
  - Density: 850.2/sq mi (328.25/km^{2})
- Time zone: UTC-6 (CST)
  - Summer (DST): UTC-5 (CDT)
- ZIP Code: 60152
- Area codes: 815/779
- FIPS code: 17-46786
- GNIS feature ID: 2395004
- Website: www.cityofmarengo.com

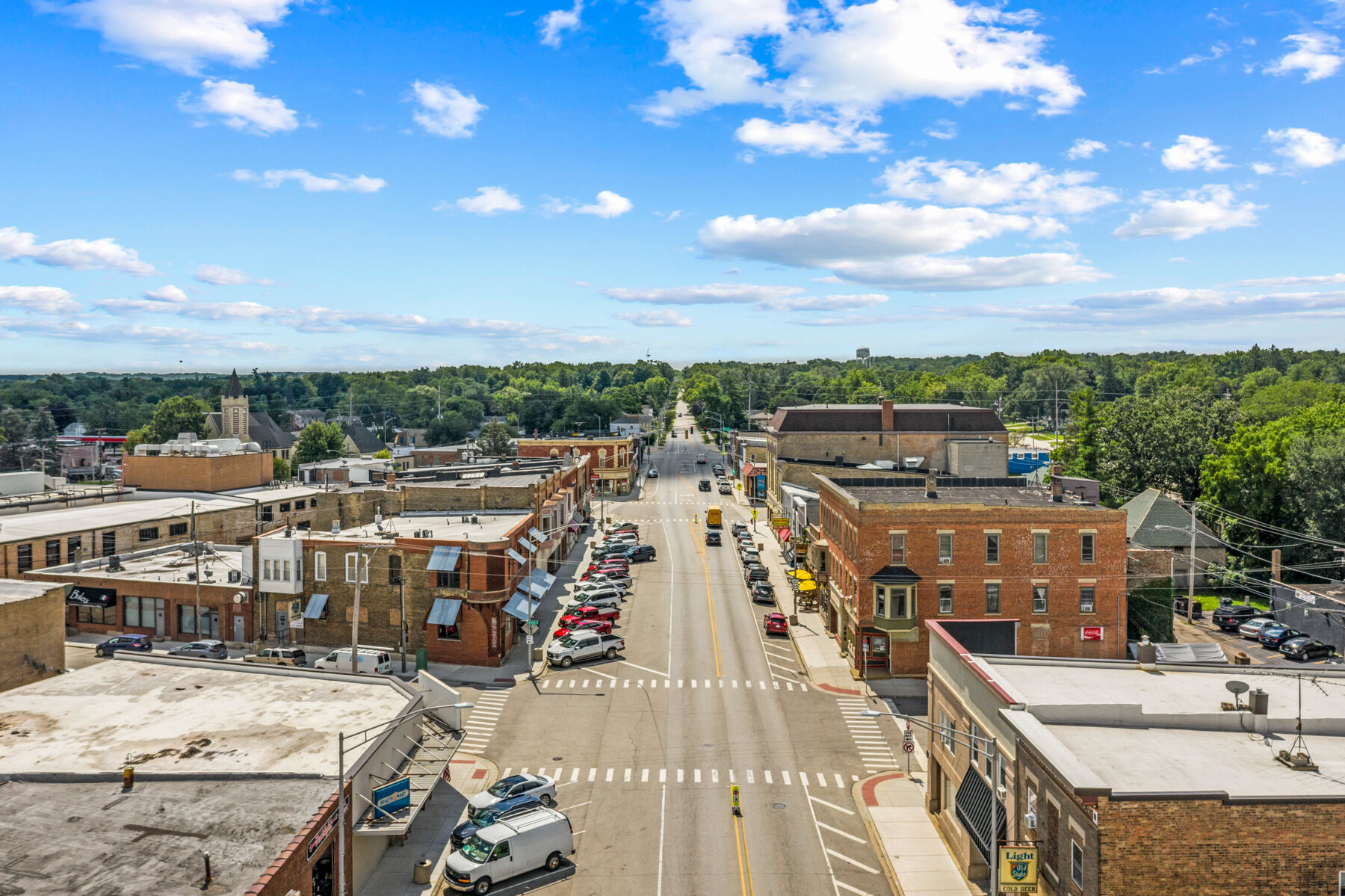
Aerial view of downtown Marengo from the north.

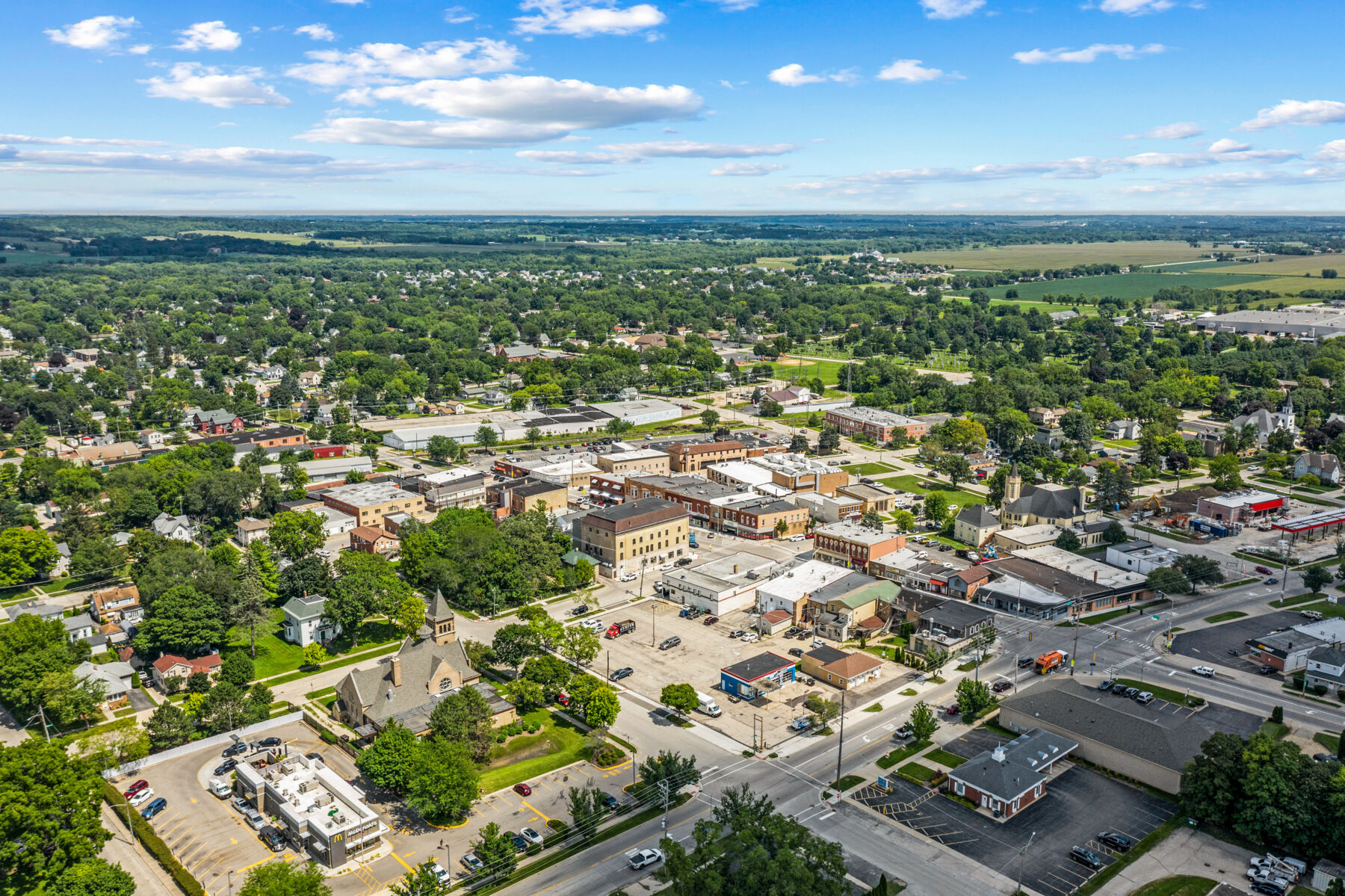
Sky view of Marengo downtown from the west.

Marengo is a city in McHenry County, Illinois, United States on the Kishwaukee River. It lies approximately 60 miles west northwest of Chicago and approximately 30 miles east of Rockford. Per the 2020 census, the population was 7,568.

== History ==
=== 24,000 B.C–1835 ===
==== Marengo Ridge ====
The Marengo Ridge conservation area, located north of the town, was formed by the retreating of the Wisconsin glacier roughly 24,000 years ago. Native Americans lived around the area prior to European settlers. When early settlers came to the area it proved difficult to farm. As a result, numerous blocks of timber were spared and still remain on the landscape.

=== 1835–1850 ===
==== First settlers ====
The first European settler of Marengo was Calvin Spencer. He is the namesake of Calvin Spencer park. He arrived in the spring of 1835 with his wife and sister. In the autumn of that same year, Moses Spencer, the father of Calvin, also moved to Marengo with his wife who died shortly thereafter, becoming the first death in the town.

In the following few years many settlers came to the area including Ward Burley, John Sponable, and Theophilus Renwick.

Marengo was first named Pleasant Grove after a grove of trees near the town site. The first post office was established in 1841, and was kept by Alfred King, at his residence, one mile west of the present city of Marengo. When the post office was established, it was called Marengo, commemorating the Battle of Marengo. When the township was organized by the county board, for convenience sake, the same name was given it as the post office held; hence the civil township, the village and its post office are all known by one and the same name, Marengo.

=== 1850–1900 ===
Marengo experienced a large growth during the post civil war years, and, by the turn of the century, the city had a rail connection to Chicago via the Chicago and north western, as well as electric interurban lines via the Elgin & Belvidere Electric Company and Woodstock and Sycamore Traction Company. It had a population of 2,005 people in the 1900 census. It became legally defined as a “city” in 1893.

==== Train station ====
In 1851 a train station was built in Marengo along the Galena and Chicago Union Railroad which the first railroad built west out of Chicago. An addition enlarged the depot in the late 1800s, by which time it was owned by the Chicago and North Western Railway, and after that it remained used for purposes of freight until the mid 1960s, although passenger service to marengo ended in 1950.

In 1967, the station was acquired by the nearby Illinois Railway Museum, cut into two large sections, transported via truck, and reassembled on its current site at the museum. The depot still houses a working dispatcher's office, which is used by the Museum on many operating days, and a public waiting room. It is the oldest railway station in regular passenger use west of Pittsburgh.

Since the 1990s the track itself is owned by Union Pacific.

=== Incorporation ===
Marengo was incorporated as a “village" February 24, 1857.

It became legally defined as a “city” starting in 1893.

=== 1900–1950 ===
The following is from ["Historical Encyclopedia of Illinois", 1901]

“Marengo (…) is in the heart of a dairying and fruit-growing district; has a foundry, stove works, condensed milk plant, canning factory, water-works, electric lights, has six churches, good schools and two weekly newspapers.”

The population in 1900 was 2,005 individuals.

==== Carl Lundgren ====
Chicago Cubs player Carl Lundgren was born in Marengo in on February 16, 1880. In the early 1900s, he played for the Zion Lutheran Church's Athletic Field, then known as Shurtleff Flats or, more formally, the Athletic Association Park. He went on to play for the Cubs from 1902 to 1909. During that time, the Cubs won the 1906 National League pennant, and back-to-back World Series Championships in 1907 and 1908. He then began a second successful career, coaching at Princeton University, University of Michigan at Ann Arbor, and then his alma mater, the University of Illinois at the Urbana-Champaign Campus where Lundgren Hall is named in his honor.

Carl died unexpectedly from a heart attack on August 21, 1934, at his Marengo childhood home, 614 W. Grant Highway. Lundgren was buried in the Marengo city cemetery.

A plaque was erected in Carl's honor at Zion Lutheran Church's athletic field by the Marengo Historical Society in October 2008.

=== 1950–2000 ===
In the post World War Two years, Marengo continued to be a rural farming community, with some industry. By the 2000s, however much of the industry had left while the farming remained.

=== 2000–present ===
In the modern times Marengo continues to grow, albeit slowly, while still retaining its rustic charm. It continues to have a farming economy, and an industrial one in the form of Mitsubishi Logisnext Americas and other local manufacturing companies. One of its biggest attractions are the gun stores, which attract individuals from Chicago and elsewhere to come purchase firearms. It also has many conservation areas that attract tourists and serve to protect the area's local fauna and wildlife.

==== House explosion ====
In the early morning of June 11, 2017, at around 4:50 A.M., a house in the northern part of town exploded. The gas explosion set four houses on fire and damaged 50 more, nearly 20 of which were deemed "unlivable” for a short time. Despite the extensive damage, no fatalities or serious injuries occurred; only two people were reported to have suffered minor injuries, although the pets that lived inside the house were killed. As of 2020 all the damages have been repaired.

== Geography ==
The north edge of Marengo is bordered by the Kishwaukee River

According to the 2010 census, Marengo has a total area of 5.01 square miles (12.98 km^{2}), all land.

=== Climate ===
Climate data for Marengo, Illinois (1991–2020 normals, extremes 1893–2018)
Month	Jan	Feb	Mar	Apr	May	Jun	Jul	Aug	Sep	Oct	Nov	Dec	Year
Record high °F (°C)	62 (17)	73 (23)	84 (29)	94 (34)	107 (42)	107 (42)	109 (43)	107 (42)	103 (39)	90 (32)	80 (27)	67 (19)	109 (43)
Mean maximum °F (°C)	47.6 (8.7)	52.6 (11.4)	68.9 (20.5)	81.5 (27.5)	87.2 (30.7)	94.0 (34.4)	95.3 (35.2)	93.4 (34.1)	89.3 (31.8)	81.9 (27.7)	67.1 (19.5)	50.4 (10.2)	97.1 (36.2)
Mean daily maximum °F (°C)	29.2 (−1.6)	33.2 (0.7)	44.9 (7.2)	58.6 (14.8)	70.2 (21.2)	79.9 (26.6)	83.5 (28.6)	81.8 (27.7)	75.4 (24.1)	62.4 (16.9)	46.9 (8.3)	34.5 (1.4)	58.4 (14.7)
Daily mean °F (°C)	20.9 (−6.2)	24.5 (−4.2)	35.4 (1.9)	47.4 (8.6)	58.7 (14.8)	68.6 (20.3)	72.6 (22.6)	70.7 (21.5)	63.6 (17.6)	51.2 (10.7)	38.0 (3.3)	26.5 (−3.1)	48.2 (9.0)
Mean daily minimum °F (°C)	12.7 (−10.7)	15.8 (−9.0)	25.9 (−3.4)	36.2 (2.3)	47.2 (8.4)	57.2 (14.0)	61.7 (16.5)	59.6 (15.3)	51.8 (11.0)	39.9 (4.4)	29.1 (−1.6)	18.5 (−7.5)	38.0 (3.3)
Mean minimum °F (°C)	−11.3 (−24.1)	−6.1 (−21.2)	7.5 (−13.6)	20.6 (−6.3)	32.1 (0.1)	42.9 (6.1)	49.4 (9.7)	47.7 (8.7)	35.4 (1.9)	24.6 (−4.1)	12.6 (−10.8)	−3.8 (−19.9)	−14.7 (−25.9)
Record low °F (°C)	−29 (−34)	−27 (−33)	−16 (−27)	6 (−14)	21 (−6)	29 (−2)	39 (4)	37 (3)	24 (−4)	8 (−13)	−17 (−27)	−26 (−32)	−29 (−34)
Average precipitation inches (mm)	1.67 (42)	1.64 (42)	2.08 (53)	3.81 (97)	4.57 (116)	4.62 (117)	4.05 (103)	4.22 (107)	3.68 (93)	2.98 (76)	2.35 (60)	1.94 (49)	37.61 (955)
Average snowfall inches (cm)	8.0 (20)	9.1 (23)	2.4 (6.1)	0.4 (1.0)	0.0 (0.0)	0.0 (0.0)	0.0 (0.0)	0.0 (0.0)	0.0 (0.0)	0.0 (0.0)	1.6 (4.1)	9.3 (24)	30.8 (78)
Average precipitation days (≥ 0.01 in)	7.2	5.8	7.9	10.5	11.7	9.8	9.0	9.0	7.2	8.0	7.4	7.4	100.9
Average snowy days (≥ 4.4)	3.5	1.1	0.4	0.0	0.0	0.0	0.0	0.0	0.0	0.0	0.6	3.3	13.3
Source: NOAA (mean maxima/minima 1981–2010)

== Demographics ==
=== Racial and ethnic composition ===
Marengo city, Illinois – Racial and ethnic composition Note: the US Census treats Hispanic/Latino as an ethnic category. This table excludes Latinos from the racial categories and assigns them to a separate category. Hispanics/Latinos may be of any race.
Race / Ethnicity (NH = Non-Hispanic)	Pop 2000	Pop 2010	Pop 2020	% 2000	% 2010	% 2020
White alone (NH)	5,441	6,305	5,758	85.62%	82.44%	76.08%
Black or African American alone (NH)	16	41	94	0.25%	0.54%	1.24%
Native American or Alaska Native alone (NH)	12	16	20	0.19%	0.21%	0.26%
Asian alone (NH)	18	37	51	0.28%	0.48%	0.67%
Pacific Islander alone (NH)	0	1	0	0.00%	0.01%	0.00%
Other race alone (NH)	0	7	16	0.00%	0.09%	0.21%
Mixed race or Multiracial (NH)	42	69	248	0.66%	0.90%	3.28%
Hispanic or Latino (any race)	826	1,172	1,381	13.00%	15.32%	18.25%
Total	6,355	7,648	7,568	100.00%	100.00%	100.00%

=== 2020 census ===
As of the 2020 census, Marengo had a population of 7,568. The median age was 37.9 years. 24.1% of residents were under the age of 18 and 15.4% of residents were 65 years of age or older. For every 100 females there were 99.6 males, and for every 100 females age 18 and over there were 97.0 males age 18 and over.

97.2% of residents lived in urban areas, while 2.8% lived in rural areas.

There were 2,933 households in Marengo, of which 32.8% had children under the age of 18 living in them. Of all households, 45.0% were married-couple households, 20.3% were households with a male householder and no spouse or partner present, and 26.3% were households with a female householder and no spouse or partner present. About 29.0% of all households were made up of individuals and 12.2% had someone living alone who was 65 years of age or older.

There were 3,091 housing units, of which 5.1% were vacant. The homeowner vacancy rate was 1.7% and the rental vacancy rate was 5.3%.

=== 2000 Census ===
As of the census of 2000, there were 6,355 people, 2,387 households, and 1,694 families residing in the city. The population density was 1,598.5 inhabitants per square mile (617.2/km^{2}). There were 2,475 housing units at an average density of 622.6 per square mile (240.4/km^{2}). The racial makeup of the city was 92.07% White, 0.30% African American, 0.27% Native American, 0.28% Asian, 0.02% Pacific Islander, 5.54% of other races, and 1.53% of two or more races. Hispanic or Latino of any race were 13.00% of the population.

There were 2,387 households, out of which 38.6% had children under the age of 18 living with them, 55.9% were married couples living together, 10.7% had a female householder with no husband present, and 29.0% were non-families. 24.9% of all households were made up of individuals, and 9.8% had someone living alone who was 65 years of age or older. The average household size was 2.64 and the average family size was 3.17.

The population was spread out, with 29.3% under the age of 18, 8.6% from 18 to 24, 31.0% from 25 to 44, 19.2% from 45 to 64, and 12.0% who were 65 years of age or older. The median age was 34 years. For every 100 females, there were 96.3 males. For every 100 females age 18 and over, there were 94.3 males.

The median income for a household in the city was $50,214, and the median income for a family was $57,209. Males had a median income of $41,298 versus $26,317 for females. The per capita income for the city was $22,225. About 3.9% of families and 4.4% of the population were below the poverty line, including 5.4% of those under age 18 and 5.5% of those age 65 or over.

Historical population
Census	Pop.	Note	%±
1860	1,119		—
1870	1,327		18.6%
1880	1,264		−4.7%
1890	1,445		14.3%
1900	2,005		38.8%
1910	1,936		−3.4%
1920	1,758		−9.2%
1930	1,948		10.8%
1940	2,034		4.4%
1950	2,726		34.0%
1960	3,568		30.9%
1970	4,235		18.7%
1980	4,361		3.0%
1990	4,768		9.3%
2000	6,355		33.3%
2010	7,648		20.3%
2020	7,568		−1.0%
U.S. Decennial Census; 2010 2020

== Government ==
Marengo is governed by the mayor, Michael Proffitt, and a city council of eight aldermen.

== Education ==
Public education in Marengo is provided by two districts. Marengo-Union Elementary School District 165 serves pre-kindergarten through eighth grade across three schools, drawing from Marengo and the neighboring village of Union. In the 2023–24 school year the district enrolled 1,081 students and employed about 70 full-time-equivalent teachers.

Marengo Community High School District 154 provides secondary education and operates a single school, Marengo Community High School. In the 2023–24 school year the district enrolled 689 students in grades 9 through 12 and employed about 48 full-time-equivalent teachers.

== Media ==
Marengo Republican-News was a newspaper that served the town from 1905-1983.

The Marengo-Union Times was a newspaper that ran from 2011 to 2019.

WXMR (94.3) is the local community radio station. It began broadcasting in 2016.

== Transportation ==
=== Roads ===
U.S. Route 20, known locally as Grant Highway, is the principal east–west route through Marengo. Illinois Route 23, locally State Street, is the principal north–south route. Illinois Route 176, locally Telegraph Street, also serves the city.

The Jane Addams Memorial Tollway (Interstate 90) passes south of Marengo. A full-access interchange connecting the tollway to Illinois Route 23 opened on December 23, 2019, at a cost of $33.4 million. It was the first interstate interchange built in McHenry County and closed a 17-mile gap between the two nearest existing interchanges. The interchange uses roundabouts and all-electronic tolling.

=== Rail ===
The rail line through Marengo, built by the Galena and Chicago Union Railroad and later operated by the Chicago and North Western Railway, has been owned by Union Pacific since the 1990s and carries freight only. Passenger service to Marengo ended in 1950.

Marengo has no commuter rail station. Metra's Union Pacific Northwest Line serves McHenry County with stations at Crystal Lake, Woodstock and Harvard, and on a weekday branch at McHenry.

=== Transit ===
Public transit is provided by MCRide, a countywide curb-to-curb dial-a-ride service operated by Pace under an intergovernmental agreement with McHenry County and participating municipalities and townships, including the city and township of Marengo. Service operates seven days a week.

== Notable people ==
- David Boies, lawyer and Chairman of Boies, Schiller & Flexner
- Jack D. Franks, former Illinois State Representative
- Elizabeth Horton, Creative Director at Chervon North America
- Carl Lundgren, pitcher for the Chicago Cubs (1902–1909); born in Marengo
- Edward D. Shurtleff, Illinois state legislator, jurist; served as mayor of Marengo
- Shane Singh, journalist and former Executive Editor of Playboy magazine
- Sherman E. Smalley, Wisconsin state assemblyman and jurist; born in Marengo
- Carrie Adell Strahorn, American pioneer, explorer, and author
- Egbert Van Alstyne, songwriter
