= Lorin C. Collins Jr. =

American judge

Lorin Cone Collins Jr.
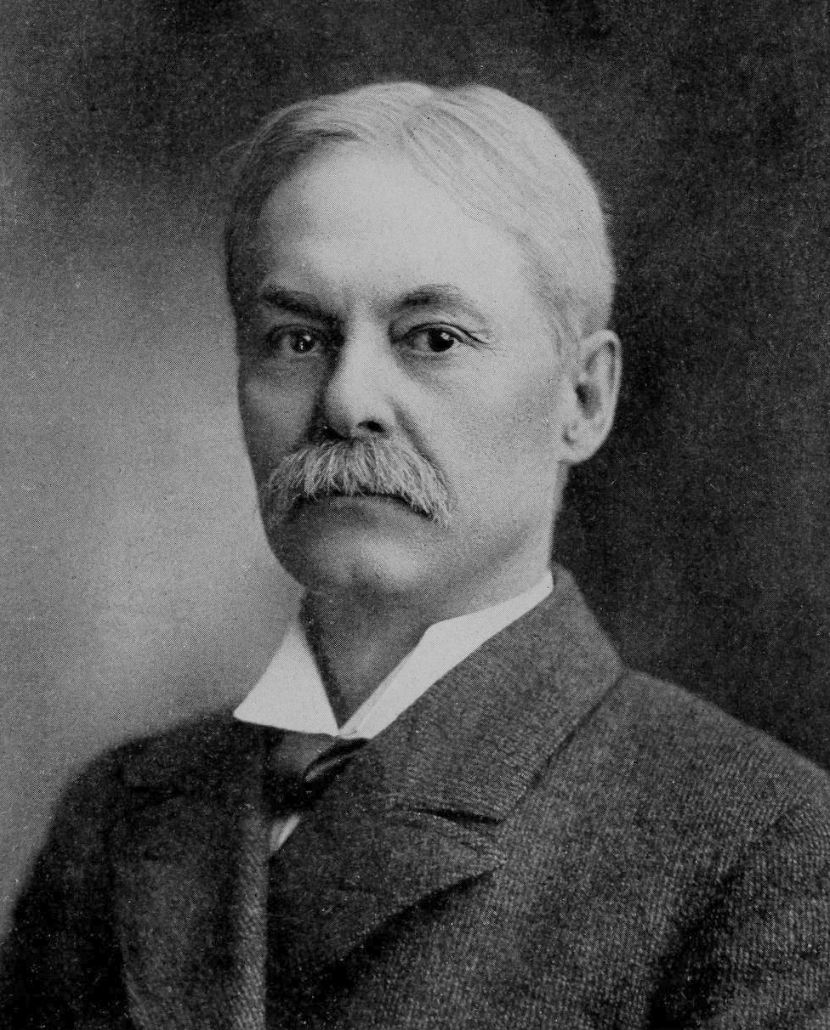

Judge of the United States District Court for the Canal Zone

Judge of the Circuit Court of Cook County
- In office 1884–1893
- Preceded by: William Henry Barnum

Speaker of the Illinois House of Representatives
- In office January 3, 1883–December 31, 1884
- Preceded by: Horace Holmes Thomas
- Succeeded by: Elijah Haines

Member of the Illinois House of Representatives from the 7th district
- In office 1878 – 1884
- Succeeded by: John Humphrey

Personal details
- Born: August 1, 1848 Windsor, Connecticut
- Died: October 18, 1940 (aged 92) Sawyer, Michigan
- Resting place: Rosehill Cemetery
- Party: Republican
- Profession: Attorney
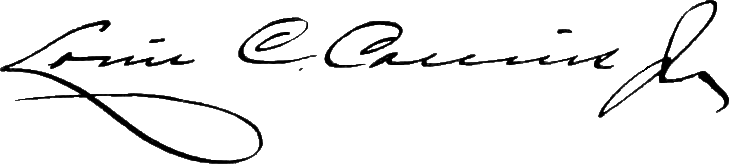
- Signature

Lorin Cone Collins Jr. (August 1, 1848 – October 18, 1940) was an American politician and judge from Connecticut. A graduate of Northwestern University, Collins entered politics at a young age and was elected to the Illinois House of Representatives. He served three two-year terms in the lower house, the last of which he was Speaker of the House. Collins was appointed as the Circuit Court of Cook County in 1884, serving until 1893. In 1905, Collins was appointed to the Supreme Court of the Panama Canal Zone.

== Biography ==
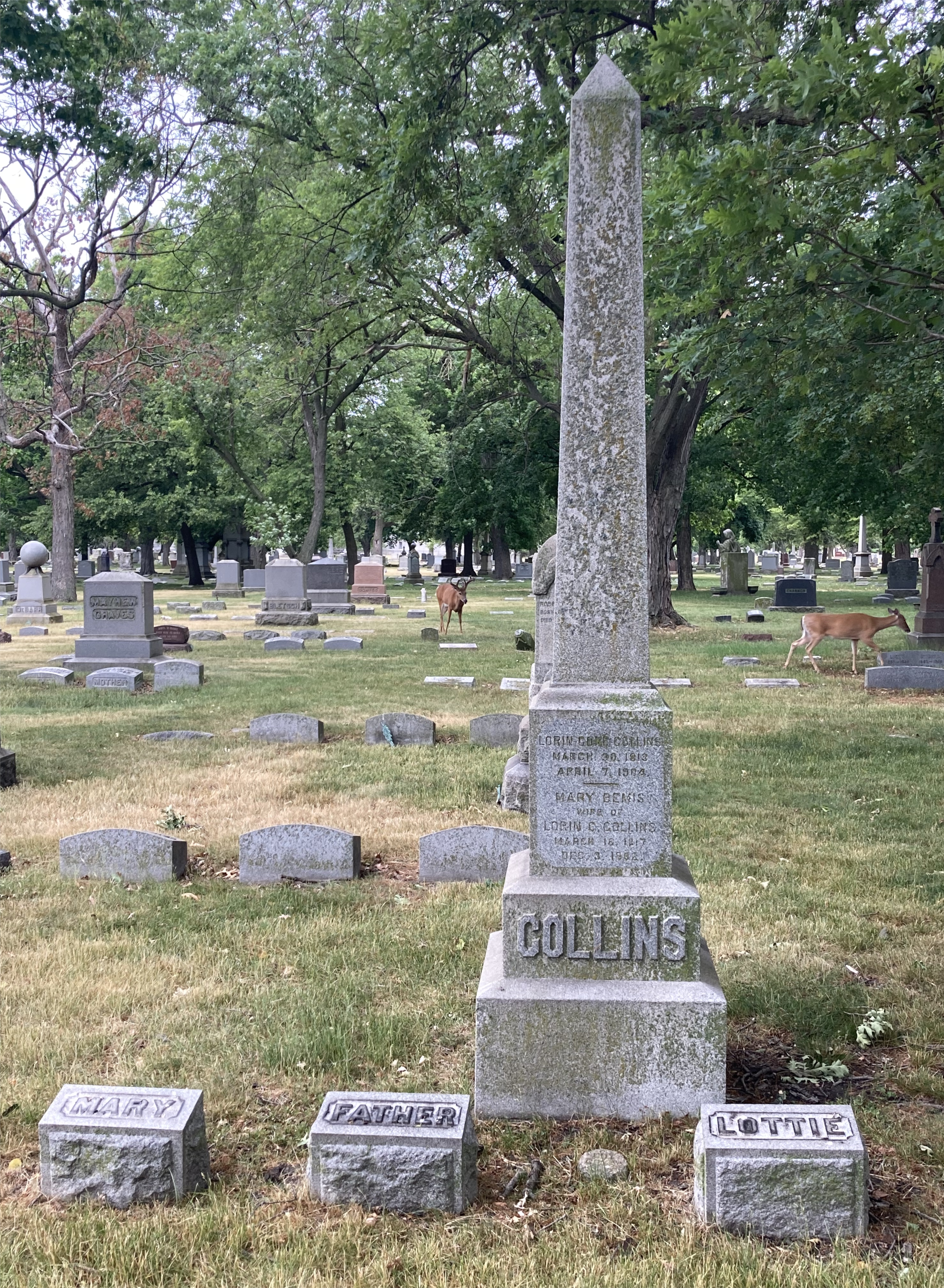
Collins' grave at Rosehill Cemetery

Lorin Cone Collins Jr. was born in Windsor, Connecticut on August 1, 1848. His namesake father was a Methodist Episcopal preacher. In 1852, the Collinses moved to St. Paul, Minnesota. Collins attended the preparatory school at Ohio Wesleyan University. He moved to Chicago, Illinois, when he was twenty, then attended Northwestern University, graduating in 1874. Collins studied law under Clarkson & Van Schaack in Chicago and was admitted to the bar in 1874.

In 1878, Collins was elected to the Illinois House of Representatives from the seventh district as a Republican. He was re-elected in 1880 and 1882, serving as Speaker of the House for the latter term. He was the youngest house speaker in the state's history, up to that time.

Collins was appointed judge of the Circuit Court of Cook County in 1884, completing the unexpired term of William Henry Barnum. He was re-elected to this seat to five-year terms in 1885 and 1891. He resigned in November 1893 to focus on his private law practice and later moved to Wheaton. Collins was appointed an associate justice to the Supreme Court of the Panama Canal Zone in 1905.

Collins married Nellie Robb in 1873. They had three surviving children: George R., Lorin C. III, and Grace. He was active in Freemasonry and was a Knight Templar. He was also a member of the Union League Club of Chicago. Collins died at George's home in Sawyer, Michigan, on October 18, 1940, and was buried at Rosehill Cemetery in Chicago.
