= Horace Holmes Thomas =

Union Army officer and politician

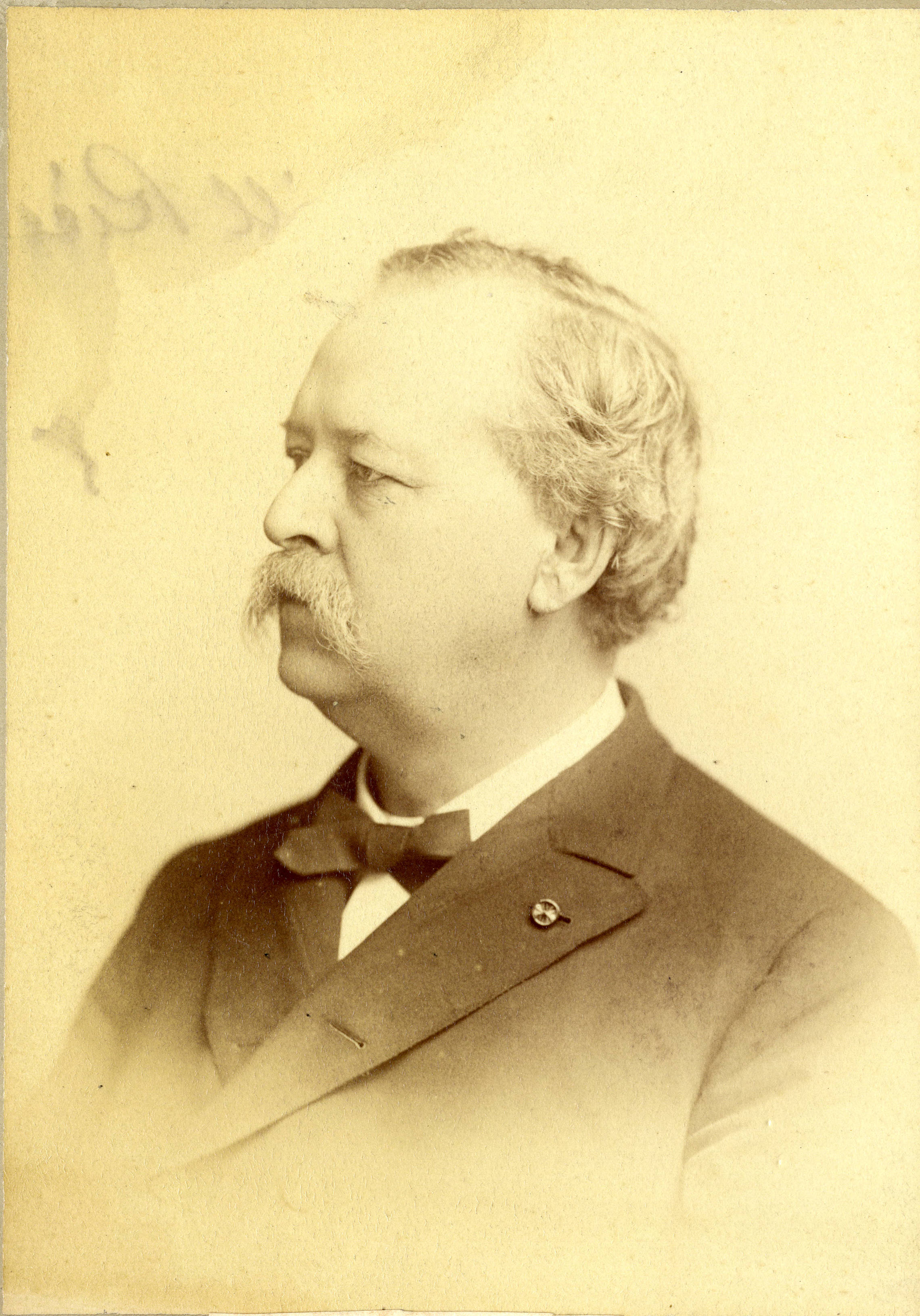
- Middlebury College Collections. Reproduced in sources including Volume 2 (1912) of Memorials of Deceased Companions of the Commandery of the State of Illinois.

Member of the Illinois Senate from the 6th District
- In office January 9, 1889 – July 22, 1890
- Preceded by: Henry W. Leman
- Succeeded by: Jacob Miller

29th Speaker of the Illinois House of Representatives
- In office January 5, 1881 – January 3, 1883
- Preceded by: William A. James
- Succeeded by: Lorin C. Collins

Member of the Illinois House of Representatives from the 6th District of Cook County
- In office January 8, 1879 – January 3, 1883 Serving with Christian Meyer, Austin Sexton, Lorin C. Collins, George G. Struckman, Bernhast F. Weber
- Preceded by: Various (multimember district)
- Succeeded by: Various (multimember district)

Personal details
- Born: December 18, 1831 Hubbardton, Vermont, U.S.
- Died: March 17, 1904 (aged 72) Chicago, Illinois, U.S.
- Party: Republican
- Spouse: Annie Greenough Hale (m. 1870)
- Children: 1
- Education: Middlebury College
- Profession: Attorney

Military service
- Allegiance: United States; Union
- Branch/service: Union Army; Tennessee Militia
- Years of service: 1861–1865 (Union Army); 1865–1867 (Militia)
- Rank: Captain (Union Army); Brigadier General (Militia)
- Unit: 8th Tennessee Infantry (Union Army); 3rd Division, II Corps (Union Army); Staff of Governor William G. Brownlow (Militia)
- Commands: Quartermaster General, Tennessee Militia
- Battles/wars: American Civil War

Horace Holmes Thomas (December 18, 1831 – March 17, 1904) was a lawyer, Union Army officer, state legislator, and appraiser in Illinois who served in the Illinois House of Representatives and Illinois Senate. He was a Speaker of the Illinois House of Representatives from 1880 to 1881.

He was born in Hubbardton, Vermont, graduated from Middlebury College, and studied law. He moved to Chicago in 1859.

He was an officer in the Union Army during the American Civil War. He wrote about his Civil War experiences. He married and had a daughter. He was written about by the Grand Army Hall and Memorial Association of Illinois in 1904.
