= Shelby M. Cullom =

American politician (1829–1914)

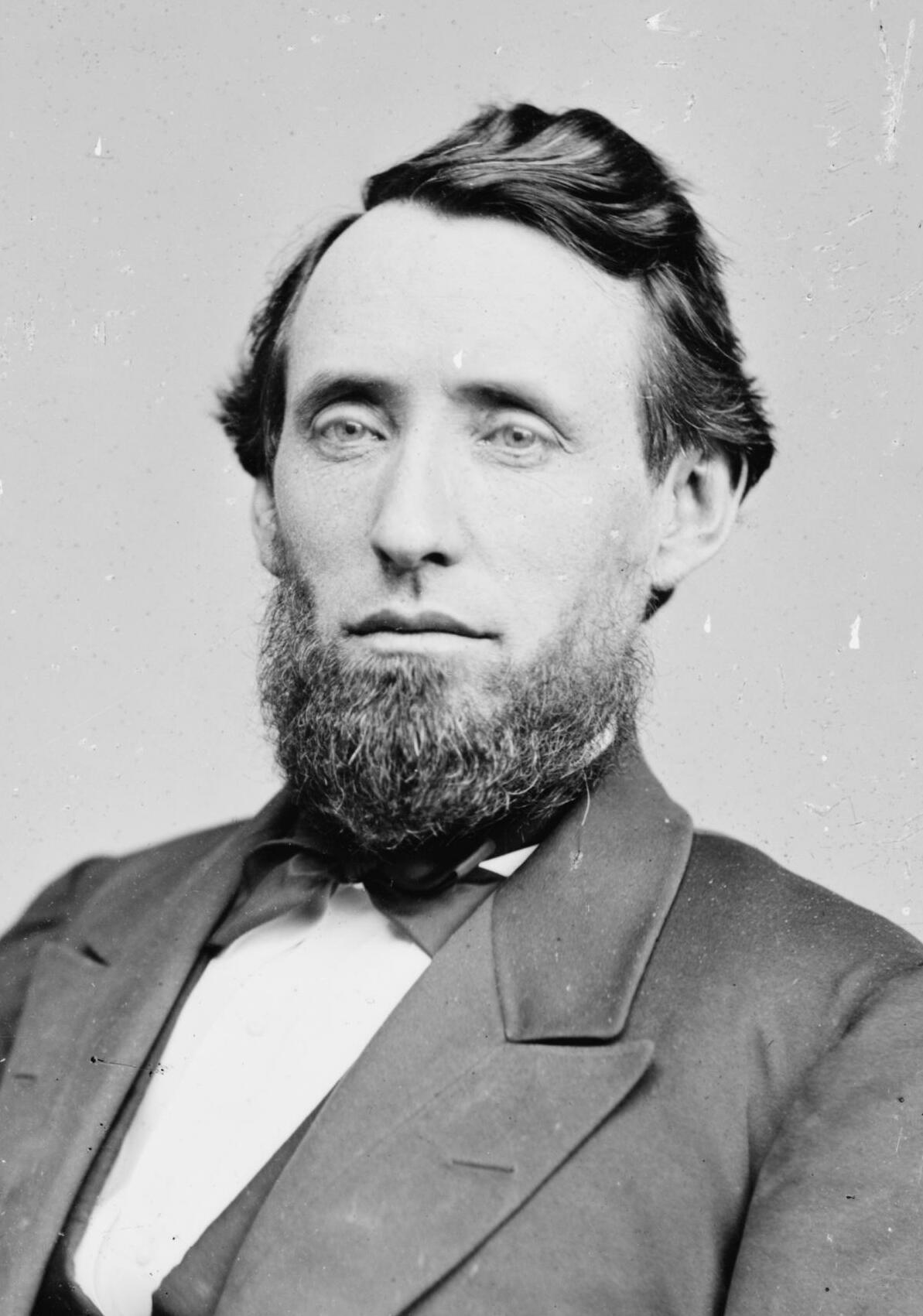
- Cullom, 1860–1875

Chairman of the Senate Republican Conference
- In office April 1911 – March 3, 1913
- Preceded by: Eugene Hale
- Succeeded by: Jacob Harold Gallinger

United States Senator from Illinois
- In office March 4, 1883 – March 3, 1913
- Preceded by: David Davis
- Succeeded by: J. Hamilton Lewis

17th Governor of Illinois
- In office January 8, 1877 – February 16, 1883
- Lieutenant: Andrew Shuman; John M. Hamilton
- Preceded by: John L. Beveridge
- Succeeded by: John M. Hamilton

Member of the U.S. House of Representatives from Illinois's 8th district
- In office March 4, 1865 – March 3, 1871
- Preceded by: John T. Stuart
- Succeeded by: James C. Robinson

Speaker of the Illinois House of Representatives
- In office 1873–1875
- Preceded by: William M. Smith
- Succeeded by: Elijah Haines
- In office 1861–1863
- Preceded by: William Ralls Morrison
- Succeeded by: Samuel A. Buckmaster

Member of the Illinois House of Representatives
- In office 1873–1875
- In office 1860–1863
- In office 1856–1857

Personal details
- Born: November 22, 1829 Monticello, Kentucky, U.S.
- Died: January 28, 1914 (aged 84) Washington, D.C., U.S.
- Resting place: Oak Ridge Cemetery, Springfield, Illinois, U.S.
- Party: Republican
- Spouses: Hannah Fisher (m. 1855; died 1861) Julia Fisher (m. 1863; died 1909)
- Children: 3
- Profession: Attorney

Shelby Moore Cullom (November 22, 1829 – January 28, 1914) was an American politician who served in the United States House of Representatives, the United States Senate and as the 17th governor of Illinois. He was Illinois's longest serving senator.

== Life and career ==
Cullom was born in 1829 in Monticello, Kentucky, a son of Richard Northcraft Cullom and Elizabeth G. "Betsey" (Coffey) Cullom. He moved with his family a year later to Tazewell County, Illinois. During his youth, Cullom assisted his father with farm labor. Cullom attended the Mount Morris Seminary for two years and became a teacher. Cullom's father served as a Whig member of the state legislature, so Cullom became interested in politics. He moved to Springfield, Illinois in 1853, where he studied law with Stuart & Edwards and was admitted to the bar in 1855. He practiced law in Springfield with Charles S. Zane, and was elected city attorney in 1855.

Cullom was elected to the Illinois House of Representatives as a Whig in 1856, serving one term. With the disintegration of the Whig party, Cullom identified with both the Republican and the American parties. He was a candidate for elector on the American party ticket during the 1856 election. In 1860, he was re-elected to the Illinois House as a Republican, and served as Speaker.

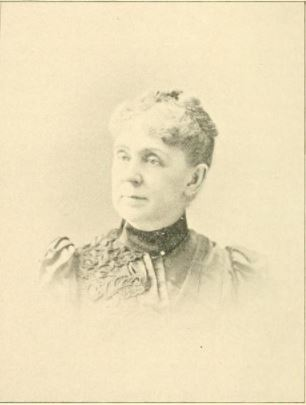
Julia Fisher

In 1855, he married Hannah Fisher. She died in 1861, and in 1863 he married her sister Julia. They were married until her death in 1909. With first wife, Cullom was the father of an infant who died at birth in 1861 and was not named, as well as daughters Ella Cullom Ridgely (1856–1902) and Catherine Cullom Hardie (1859–1894).

He was elected in 1864 to the Thirty-ninth, and reelected to the Fortieth and Forty-first Congresses (March 4, 1865 – March 3, 1871). In 1870, he lost renomination, falling one vote short at a party convention that lasted 186 ballots over five days. Cullom returned to the Illinois House from 1873 to 1874, serving again as Speaker. In 1876, he was elected Governor of Illinois, defeating Lewis Steward by 6,834 votes. He was re-elected in 1880, becoming the first Illinois governor to be re-elected after a four-year term. Under Cullom's governorship, the Southern Illinois Penitentiary was commissioned, the Great Railroad Strike of 1877 was quelled, the Illinois Appellate Court was founded, and the Illinois State Board of Health was established. He resigned in 1883 to take office as a US senator; Lieutenant Governor John Marshall Hamilton assumed the governorship in his place. Cullom was elected to the United States Senate in 1882, and reelected in 1888, 1894, 1900 and 1906, serving from March 4, 1883, to March 3, 1913. As a Senator, Cullom oversaw the passage of the Interstate Commerce Act of 1887. He believed that only the federal government had the power to force railroads to provide fair treatment to all of its customers, large and small. This was because corporations, such as Standard Oil, had corrupted many of the railroads' officials into providing them with rebates, and as a whole, the companies in question were more powerful than any state government.

Cullom had an interest in the territories of the United States of the time. Together with Congressman Isaac S. Struble, Cullom pushed the Cullom-Struble Bill, whose sanctions against polygamy included exclusion of the Utah Territory from statehood. The bill was on the verge of passing Congress in 1890, but the legislation was preempted when the Church of Jesus Christ of Latter-day Saints (LDS Church) formally disavowed polygamous marriages with the 1890 Manifesto. Cullom was appointed by President William McKinley in July 1898 to the commission created by the Newlands Resolution to establish government in the Territory of Hawaii.

He died in 1914 in Washington, D.C., and is buried in Oak Ridge Cemetery in Springfield. Cullom was a close personal friend and associate of Jacob Bunn and John Whitfield Bunn, the Illinois industrialist brothers who contributed to the building of hundreds of millions of dollars of business enterprises by 1900. The village of Cullom, Illinois, is named in his honor.

== Notes ==
Party political offices
Preceded by Richard J. Oglesby	Republican nominee for Governor of Illinois; 1876, 1880	Succeeded by Richard J. Oglesby
U.S. House of Representatives
Preceded by John T. Stuart	Member of the U.S. House of Representatives from Illinois's 8th congressional district 1865–1871	Succeeded by James Robinson
Political offices
Preceded by John Lourie Beveridge	Governor of Illinois; 1877–1883	Succeeded by John Marshall Hamilton
U.S. Senate
Preceded by David Davis	Class 2 U.S. Senator from Illinois; 1883–1913	Succeeded by James H. Lewis
Honorary titles
Preceded by William P. Frye	Dean of the United States Senate; August 8, 1911 – March 3, 1913	Succeeded by Jacob Harold Gallinger
