= 48th Illinois General Assembly =

1913 to 1915 legislative session

←	47th	49th	→
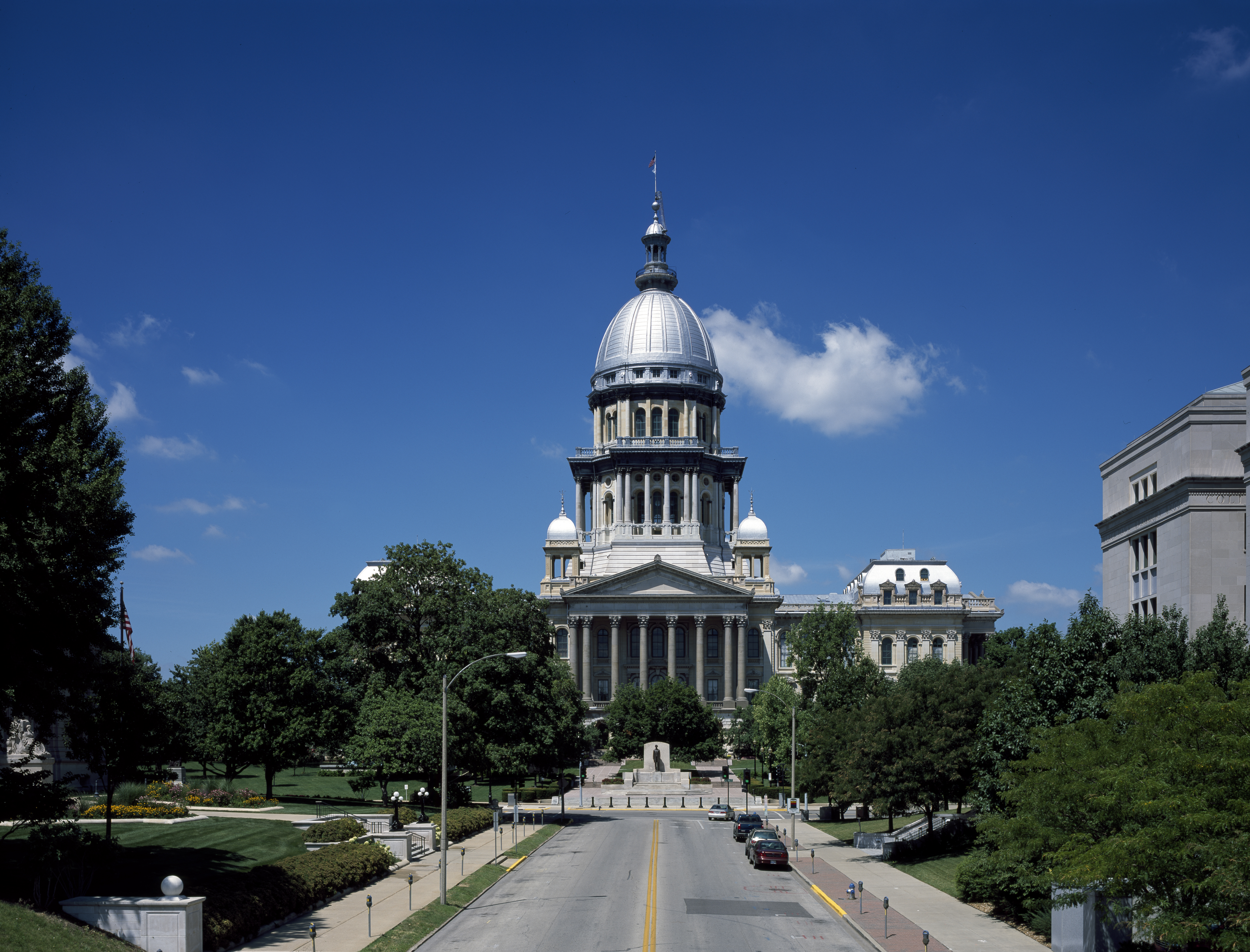
- The Illinois State Capitol

Overview
- Meeting place: Springfield, Illinois
- Term: 1913 – 1915
- Election: 1912

Illinois Senate
- President: Barratt O'Hara, Democratic
- President pro tempore: Walter I. Manny, Democratic

Illinois House of Representatives
- Speaker: William B. McKinley, Democratic

The 48th Illinois General Assembly met from 1913 to 1915. Barratt O'Hara of Chicago was the Lieutenant Governor of Illinois and thus ex officio President of the Senate. (Note: This arrangement was discontinued with the adoption of the current Constitution of Illinois in 1970, effective 1973.) Walter I. Manny was President pro tempore of the Senate. William B. McKinley of Chicago was the Speaker of the House of Representatives.

== Districts ==
Illinois was divided into 51 districts, each of which elected one Senator and three Representatives. Districts were last reapportioned in 1901 and would not be reapportioned again until 1947.

The counties of each district were as follows:

- 1st, 2nd, 3rd, 4th, 5th, 6th, 7th, 9th, 11th, 13th, 15th, 17th, 19th, 21st, 23rd, 25th, 27th, 29th, and 31st: Parts of Cook
- 8th: Lake, McHenry, and Boone
- 10th: Ogle and Winnebago
- 12th: Stephenson, Jo Daviess, and Carroll
- 14th: Kane and Kendall
- 16th: Marshall, Putnam, Livingston, and Woodford
- 18th: Peoria
- 20th: Grundy, Kankakee, and Iroquois
- 22nd: Vermillion and Edgar
- 24th: Champaign, Piatt, and Moultrie
- 26th: Ford and McLean
- 28th: DeWitt, Logan, and Macon
- 30th: Tazewell, Mason, Menard, Cass, Schuyler, and Brown
- 32nd: Hancock, McDonough, and Warren
- 33rd: Henderson, Mercer, and Rock Island
- 34th: Douglas, Coles, and Clark
- 35th: Whiteside, Lee, and DeKalb
- 36th: Adams, Pike, Calhoun, and Scott
- 37th: Henry, Stark, and Bureau
- 38th: Greene, Jersey, Macoupin, and Montgomery
- 39th: LaSalle
- 40th: Christian, Shelby, Cumberland, and Fayette
- 41st: DuPage and Will
- 42nd: Clinton, Marion, Clay, and Effingham
- 43rd: Knox and Fulton
- 44th: Jackson, Perry, Washington, Randolph, and Monroe
- 45th: Morgan and Sangamon
- 46th: Jefferson, Wayne, Richland, and Jasper
- 47th: Madison and Bond
- 48th: Hardin, Gallatin, White, Edwards, Wabash, Lawrence, and Crawford
- 49th: St. Clair
- 50th: Hamilton, Saline, Pope, Johnson, and Massac
- 51st: Franklin, Williamson, Union, Pulaski, and Alexander

== See also ==
- List of Illinois state legislatures

== Bibliography ==
- James Langland, M.A. (1920). The Chicago Daily News Almanac and Year-Book for 1921. Chicago, IL: The Chicago Daily News Company.
