= John Meyer (Illinois politician) =

American politician

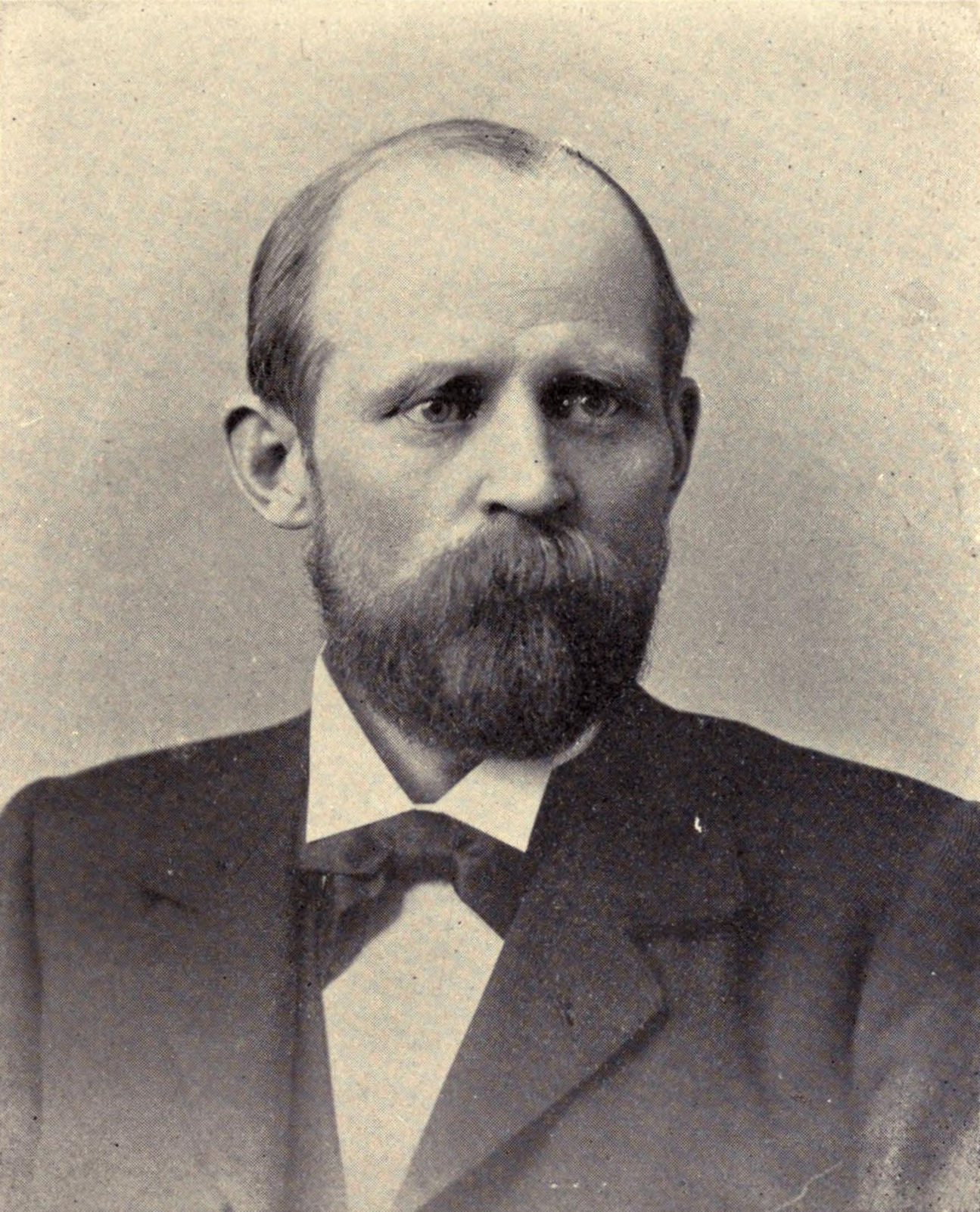
Meyer c. 1895

John Meyer (February 27, 1852 – July 3, 1895) was an American lawyer and politician.

Meyer was born in the Netherlands. He emigrated to the United States with his parents in 1867 and settled in Chicago, Illinois. He went to the public schools in Chicago. He studied law at Northwestern University Pritzker School of Law. He received his law degree in 1879 and was admitted to the Illinois bar. Meyer practiced law in Freeport, Illinois with his brother-in-law. Meyer served in the Illinois House of Representatives from 1884 until his death in 1895. He served as speaker of the house in 1895 and was a Republican. Meyer died at his brother-in-law's home in Freeport, Illinois. He was associated with the "Big Four" (Daniel S. Berry, Edgar C. Hawley, Freeman P. Morris, and Clayton E. Crafts), a group of Illinois legislators known for their corporate ties.
