= William M. Smith =

American politician from Illinois (1827–1886)

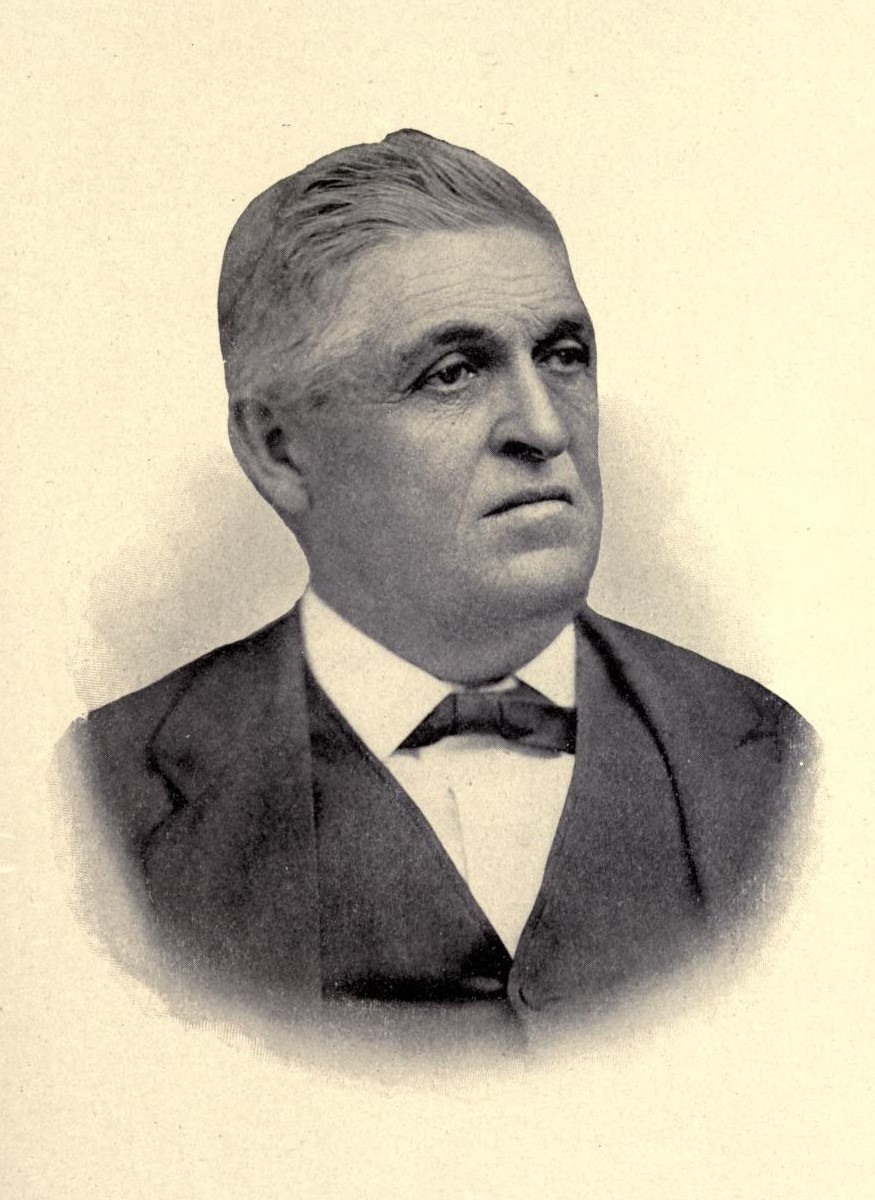

Member of the Illinois House of Representatives from the 63rd district
- In office 1867 – 1873

Speaker of the Illinois House of Representatives
- In office 1871–1873
- Preceded by: Franklin Corwin
- Succeeded by: Shelby Moore Cullom

Personal details
- Born: May 23, 1827 Frankfort, Kentucky
- Died: March 25, 1886 (aged 58) Lexington, Illinois
- Party: Republican

William M. Smith (May 23, 1827 – March 25, 1886) was an American politician who served as the 24th Speaker of the Illinois House of Representatives. A Republican, he held the position from 1871 until 1873.

== Life and political career ==
Smith was born May 23, 1827, in Franklin County, Kentucky, moving to McLean County, Illinois when he was thirteen years old. He was involved in Republican politics since the founding of the party and was unafraid to espouse his anti-slavery beliefs. He was a delegate at the Illinois State Republican convention in 1860 and nominated Abraham Lincoln for the presidency.

He was elected to the Illinois House of Representatives in 1866, 1868, and 1870. He fiercely opposed the policies of Andrew Johnson, and was known to Illinois newspapers as "The Duke of Lexington" due to his strong personality. He spent his last two years in the legislature as Speaker of the Illinois House of Representatives. After Shelby M. Cullom was elected Governor of Illinois he appointed Smith to the board of the Railroad and Warehouse Commission, where he remained until ill health compelled him to resign. Smith resided in Lexington, Illinois, where he farmed and dealt in cattle. He was a member of the Methodist Church and had one daughter with his wife, Nancy Hopkins.

== Death ==
On March 25, 1886, Smith committed suicide by gunshot in a barn on his farm.
