= Indianola, Illinois =

Indianola
- Village
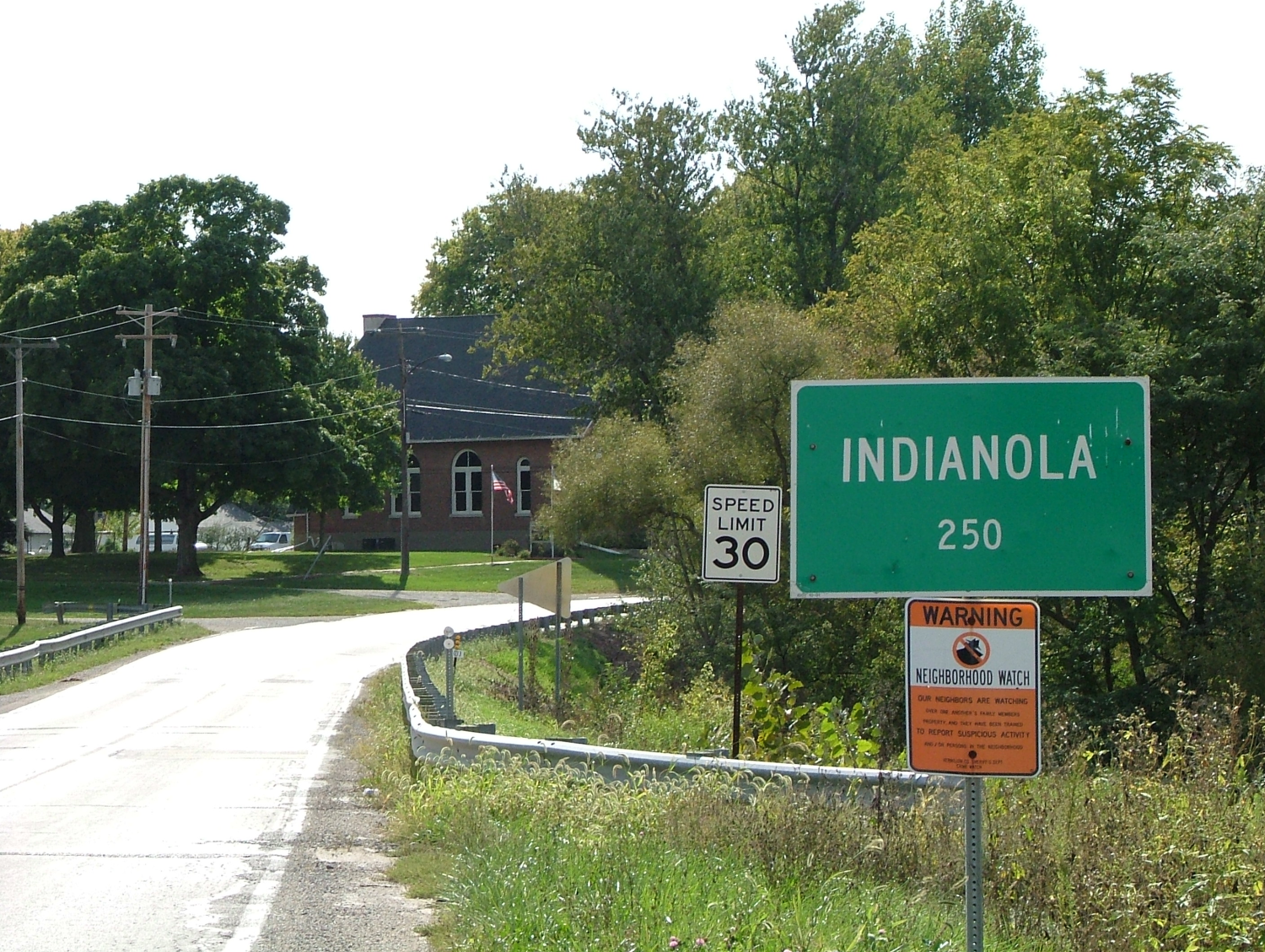
- Indianola from the northeast

- Location of Indianola in Vermilion County, Illinois.

- Indianola's location in Vermilion County
- Coordinates: 39°55′37″N 87°44′25″W
- Country: United States
- State: Illinois
- County: Vermilion
- Township: Carroll

Area
  - Total: 0.39 sq mi (1.01 km^{2})
  - Land: 0.39 sq mi (1.01 km^{2})
  - Water: 0 sq mi (0.00 km^{2})
- Elevation: 673 ft (205 m)

Population (2020)
  - Total: 227
  - Density: 584.4/sq mi (225.65/km^{2})
- Time zone: UTC-6 (CST)
  - Summer (DST): UTC-5 (CDT)
- ZIP code: 61850
- Area code: 217
- FIPS code: 17-37348
- GNIS ID: 2398573
- Website: indianola-il.com

Indianola is a village in Carroll Township, Vermilion County, Illinois, United States. It is part of the Danville, Illinois metropolitan area. As of the 2020 census, Indianola had a population of 227.

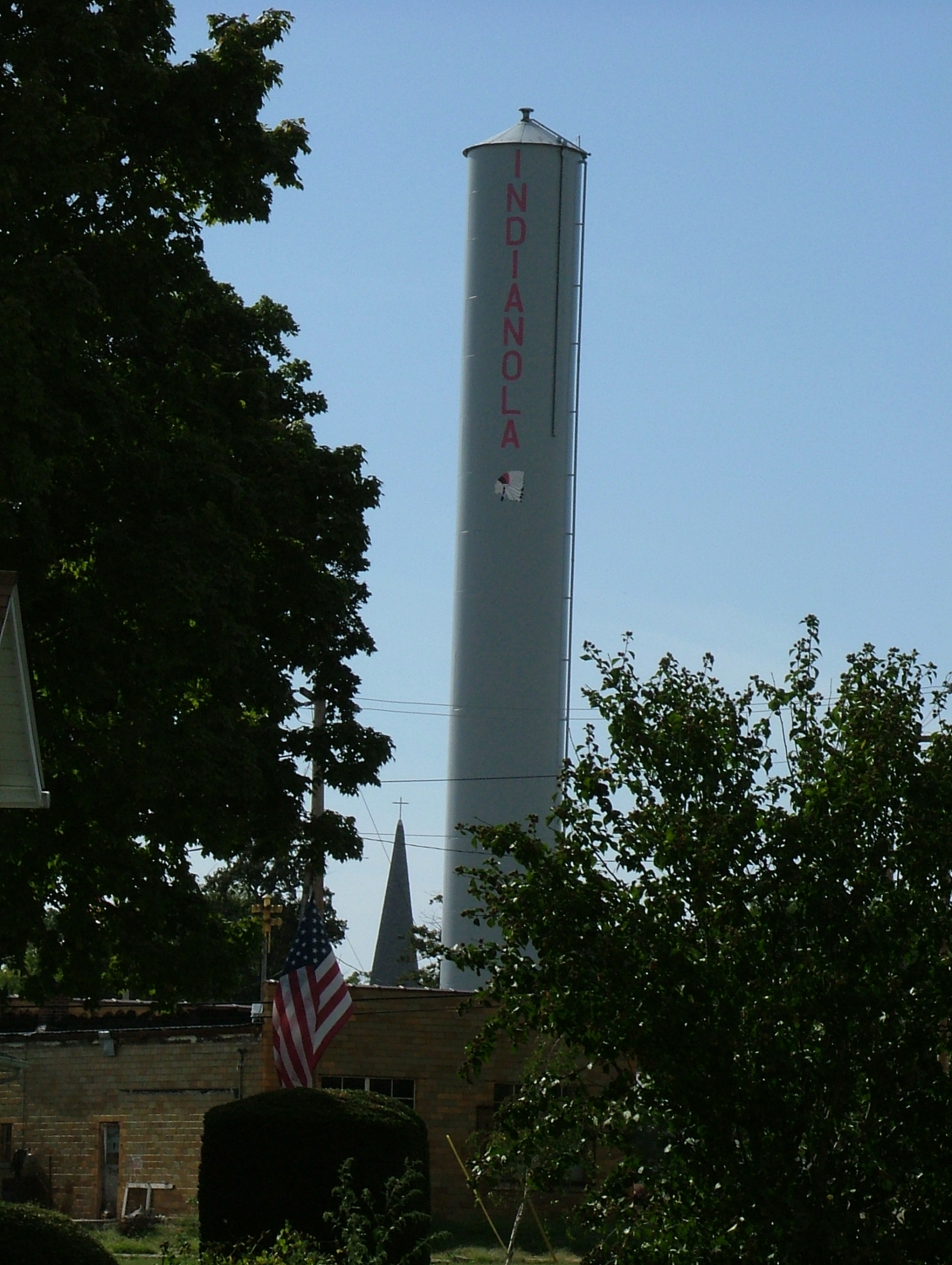
The water tower in Indianola

== Geography ==
According to the 2010 census, Indianola has a total area of 0.39 square miles (1.01 km^{2}), all land.

== Demographics ==
Historical population
Census	Pop.	Note	%±
1880	308		—
1890	472		53.2%
1900	381		−19.3%
1910	365		−4.2%
1920	359		−1.6%
1930	408		13.6%
1940	411		0.7%
1950	392		−4.6%
1960	295		−24.7%
1970	374		26.8%
1980	370		−1.1%
1990	336		−9.2%
2000	207		−38.4%
2010	276		33.3%
2020	227		−17.8%
U.S. Decennial Census

As of the census of 2000, there were 207 people, 79 households, and 57 families residing in the village. The population density was 535.8 inhabitants per square mile (206.9/km^{2}). There were 86 housing units at an average density of 222.6 per square mile (85.9/km^{2}). The racial makeup of the village was 98.55% White, 0.48% African American, 0.48% Asian, and 0.48% from two or more races.

There were 79 households, out of which 36.7% had children under the age of 18 living with them, 60.8% were married couples living together, 7.6% had a female householder with no husband present, and 27.8% were non-families. 21.5% of all households were made up of individuals, and 10.1% had someone living alone who was 65 years of age or older. The average household size was 2.62 and the average family size was 3.05.

In the village, the population was spread out, with 27.5% under the age of 18, 9.2% from 18 to 24, 27.5% from 25 to 44, 28.0% from 45 to 64, and 7.7% who were 65 years of age or older. The median age was 37 years. For every 100 females, there were 102.9 males. For every 100 females age 18 and over, there were 97.4 males.

The median income for a household in the village was $42,125, and the median income for a family was $44,688. Males had a median income of $33,125 versus $17,250 for females. The per capita income for the village was $16,284. About 6.2% of families and 6.0% of the population were below the poverty line, including 13.3% of those under the age of eighteen and none of those 65 or over.

== Education ==
It is in the Salt Fork Community Unit School District 512.

== Notable people ==
- Martin B. Bailey, Illinois lawyer and state legislator
- William Parker McKee, president of Shimer College (1897–1930)
- Ryan Thomas, UFC fighter
