= Henry M. Dunlap =

American politician and lawyer (1853-1938)

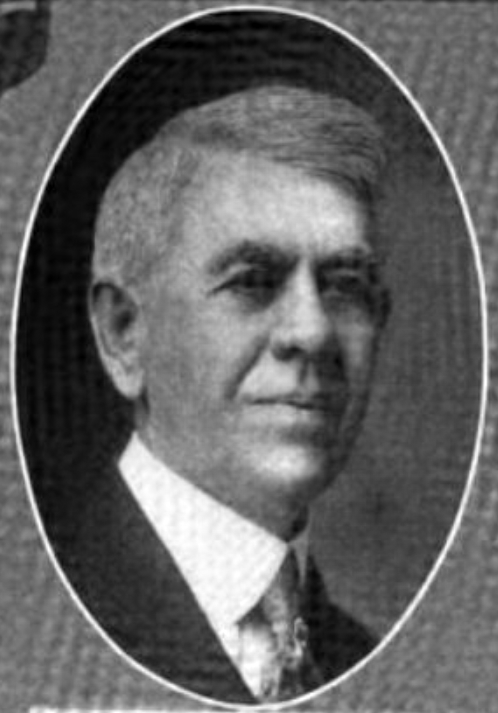

Member of the Illinois Senate
- In office 1892–1912
- In office 1916–1932

Personal details
- Born: Henry Moses Dunlap; November 14, 1853 Cook County, Illinois
- Died: January 8, 1938 (aged 84) Champaign, Illinois
- Party: Republican
- Education: University of Illinois at Urbana–Champaign
- Occupation: Farmer, businessman, politician

Henry Moses Dunlap (November 14, 1853 – January 8, 1938) was an American farmer, businessman, and longtime state senator of Illinois.

== Biography ==
Dunlap was born in Cook County, Illinois. In 1857, he moved with his parents and settled in Savoy, Illinois. He went to the public schools and graduated from University of Illinois at Urbana–Champaign in 1875. Dunlap was a farmer and owned an apple orchard. He served in the Illinois Constitutional Convention of 1919 and was a Republican. Dunlap served in the Illinois Senate from 1893 to 1912 and from 1917 to 1932. He served as president pro tempore of the senate in 1911. Dunlap died from a heart attack at his home in Champaign, Illinois.
