= John M. O'Connor (Illinois politician) =

American politician

Member of the Illinois Senate

Personal details
- Born: Lee County, Iowa
- Party: Democratic

John M. O'Connor was an American politician who served as a member of the Illinois Senate.
