= Shane Singh =

American journalist

Shane Michael Singh (born 1987 or 1988 (age 37–38)) is an American journalist.

== Career ==
From 2017 to 2019, he was an Executive Editor of Playboy. He won the Folio magazine award in 2016 for his piece "My Deportation".

In 2015, Singh wrote an article for Playboy about Tula, a transgender woman who appeared in the publication.

In December 2019, he left Playboy and joined The Trevor Project.

In 2023, he became editorial director of United Talent Agency.

== Personal life ==
Singh is a gay.
