= Samuel Holmes (politician) =

American politician

Samuel Holmes was an American politician who served as Speaker of the Illinois House of Representatives in the 20th Illinois General Assembly during the late 1850s. He was elected from Adams County, Illinois.

He was elected Speaker of the House over Isaac N. Arnold by a vote of 36 to 28.
