= Edward D. Shurtleff =

American politician (1863–1936)

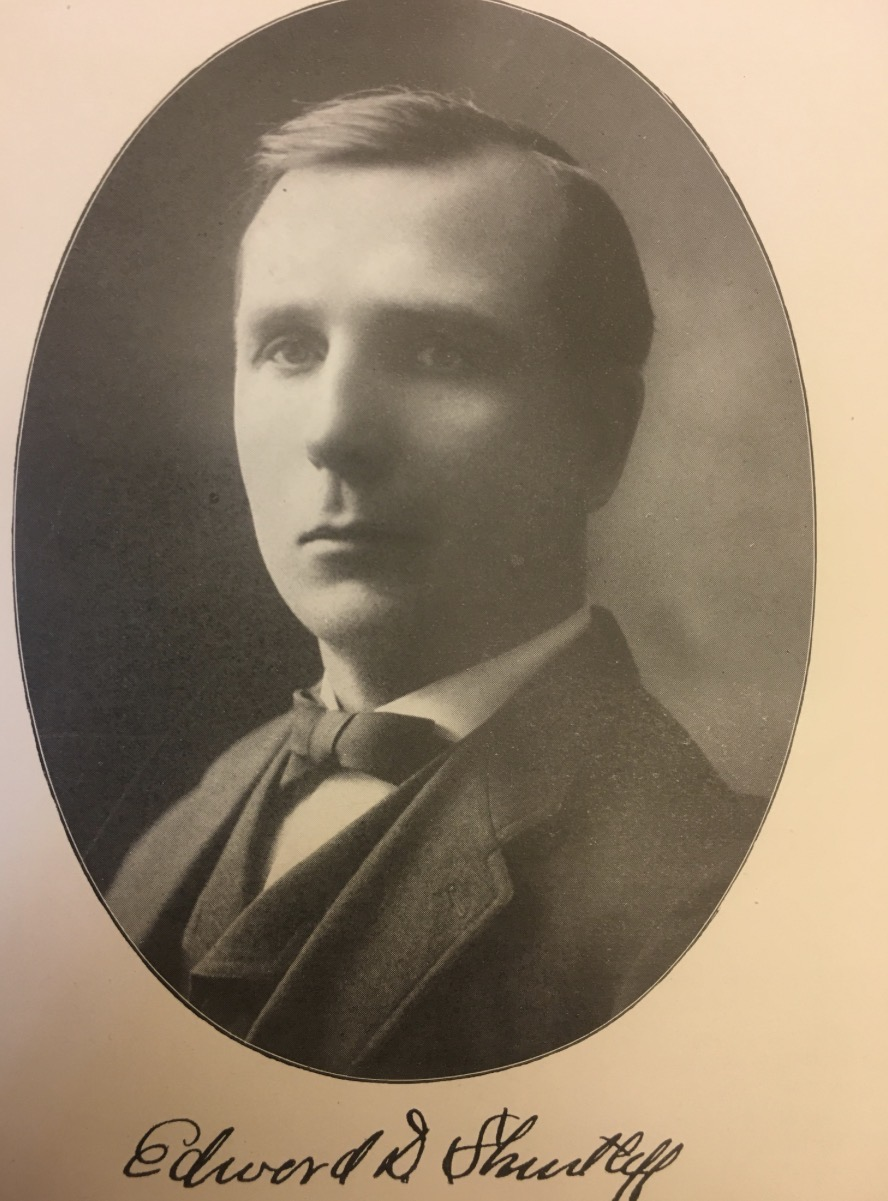

Justice of the Illinois Appellate Court
- In office 1927–1933

Speaker of the Illinois House of Representatives
- In office 1905–1909

Member of the Illinois House of Representatives
- In office 1900–1919

Personal details
- Born: Edward David Shurtleff; September 19, 1863 Genoa, Illinois, U.S.
- Died: December 14, 1936 (aged 73) Marengo, Illinois, U.S.
- Party: Republican
- Education: Oberlin College
- Occupation: Politician, lawyer, judge

Edward David Shurtleff (September 19, 1863 – December 14, 1936) was an American jurist and politician.

Born in Genoa, Illinois, Shurtleff studied at Oberlin College. He studied law and was admitted to the Dakota Territory bar and then practiced in what is now the state of South Dakota. In 1894, Shurtleff was admitted to the Illinois bar and practiced law in Marengo, Illinois. Shurtleff served on the McHenry County, Illinois Board of Commissioners and served as mayor of Marengo, Illinois. He also practiced law in Chicago, Illinois. From 1900 until 1919, Shurtleff served in the Illinois House of Representatives and was the speaker of the house from 1905 to 1909. In 1919, Shurtleff was appointed Illinois Circuit Court judge. From 1927 to 1933, Shurtleff served on the Illinois Appellate Court. Shurtleff died at his home in Marengo, Illinois from a heart attack.
