= Martin B. Bailey =

American politician & lawyer (1857–1934)

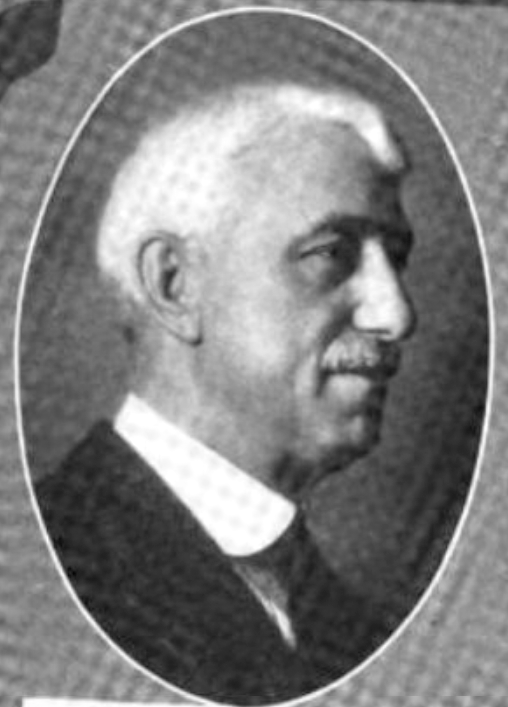

Member of the Illinois Senate
- In office 1900–1906

Member of the Illinois House of Representatives
- In office 1894–1900

Personal details
- Born: Martin Brachall Bailey; January 22, 1857 Indianola, Illinois
- Died: July 27, 1934 (aged 77) Danville, Illinois
- Party: Republican
- Education: Illinois State University; Earlham College; Columbia Law School
- Occupation: Lawyer, politician

Martin Brachall Bailey (January 22, 1857 – July 27, 1934) was an American politician and lawyer who served in both chambers of the Illinois General Assembly as a member of the Republican Party, serving in the Illinois House of Representatives from 1895 to 1899 and in the Illinois Senate from 1901 to 1905 and from 1909 to 1934. He also served as mayor of Danville, Illinois.

== Biography ==
Bailey was born in Indianola, Illinois and went to the public schools. He went to Illinois State University, Earlham College, and Columbia Law School. Bailey was admitted to the Illinois bar and practices law in Danville, Illinois. He served as mayor of Danville and was a Republican. Bailey served in the Illinois House of Representatives from 1895 to 1899. He then served in the Illinois Senate from 1901 to 1905 and from 1909 to 1934. Bailey died at his home in Danville, Illinois.
