= Edgar C. Hawley =

American politician (1850–1929)

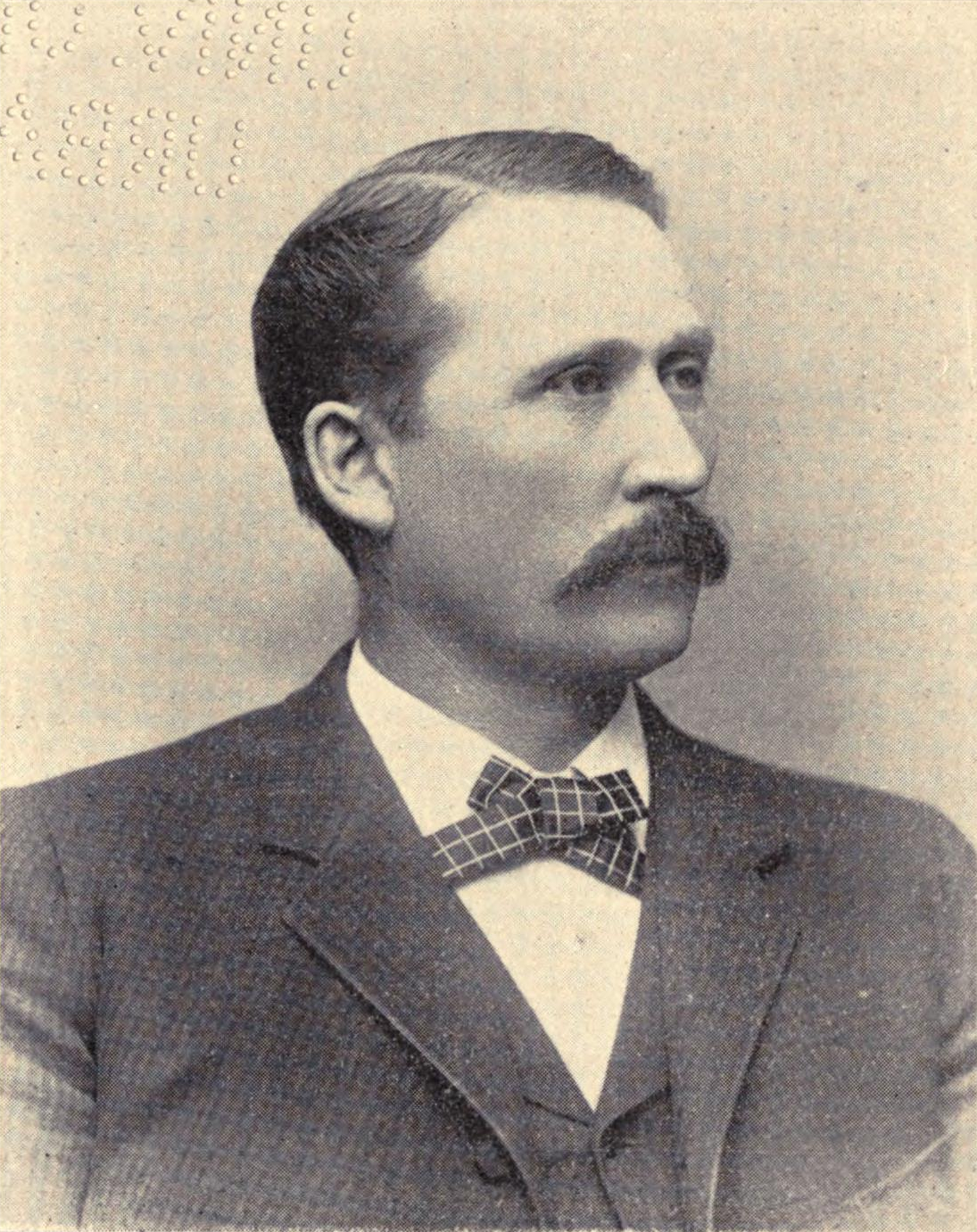
- Hawley c. 1895

Minority Leader of the Illinois House of Representatives
- In office January 4, 1893 – January 9, 1895
- Preceded by: David Hunter
- Succeeded by: Clayton E. Crafts

Member of the Illinois House of Representatives from the 14th district
- In office January 9, 1889 – January 6, 1897
- Preceded by: Multi-member district
- Succeeded by: Multi-member district

Member of the Kane County Board of Supervisors
- In office 1877–1879

Personal details
- Born: Edgar Clinton Hawley; February 20, 1850 Barrington, Illinois, U.S.
- Died: May 13, 1929 (aged 79) Arcadia, California, U.S.
- Resting place: Mountain View Cemetery; Altadena, California
- Party: Republican
- Spouse: Esther E. Hunt (m. 1871; died 1916)
- Children: 3
- Profession: Merchant
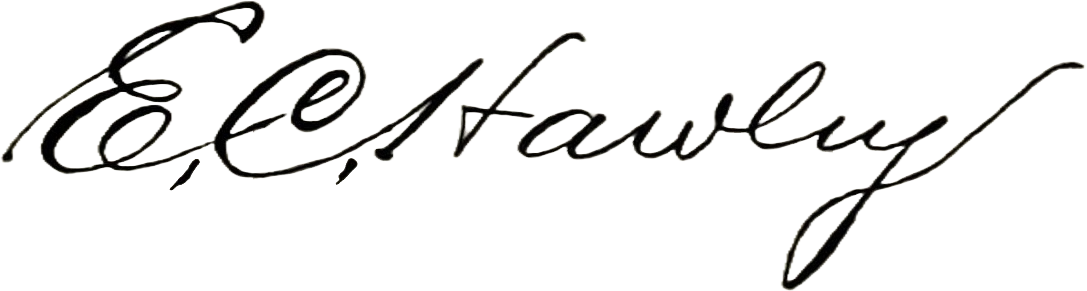
- Signature

Edgar Clinton Hawley (February 20, 1850 – May 13, 1929) was an American merchant and politician who served four terms in the Illinois House of Representatives for the 14th district from 1889 to 1897, and as Republican minority leader from 1893 to 1895. He was a member of the "Big Four," a group of Illinois legislators known for their corporate ties.
