= John H. Gray (Illinois politician) =

American politician

Member of the Illinois Senate

Personal details
- Born: 1855 Spencer, Indiana
- Died: Unknown
- Party: Republican

John H. Gray was an American politician who served as a member of the Illinois Senate.
