= Albert C. Clark =

Illinois state senator (1865-1929)

Albert C. Clark (1865 – 1929) was a businessman and state senator in Illinois. His factory made oxygen equipment for pilots during World War I. He served in the Illinois Senate from 1902 to 1914 and from 1917 until at least 1922. He helped organize triage after the deadly Iroquois Theatre fire on December 30, 1903.

== See also ==
- Illinois's 13th Senate district
