= Marengo Township, Illinois =

Coordinates: 42°17′25″N 88°38′28″W

Marengo Township
- Township
- Location in McHenry County
- Country: United States
- State: Illinois
- County: McHenry
- Established: November 6, 1849

Area
  - Total: 35.91 sq mi (93.0 km^{2})
  - Land: 35.89 sq mi (93.0 km^{2})
  - Water: 0.02 sq mi (0.052 km^{2}) 0.06%

Population (2020)
  - Total: 7,202
  - Density: 210.7/sq mi (81.4/km^{2})
- Time zone: UTC-6 (CST)
  - Summer (DST): UTC-5 (CDT)
- FIPS code: 17-111-46799
- Website: http://marengotownship.org/

Marengo Township is located in McHenry County, Illinois. As of the 2020 census, its population was 7,202 and it contained 3,065 housing units. Marengo is a city located in the township.

== Geography ==
According to the 2010 census, the township has a total area of 35.91 square miles (93.0 km^{2}), of which 35.89 square miles (93.0 km^{2}) (or 99.94%) is land and 0.02 square miles (0.052 km^{2}) (or 0.06%) is water.

== Demographics ==
Historical population
Census	Pop.	Note	%±
2010	7,564		—
2020	7,202		−4.8%
U.S. Decennial Census
