= James F. Gibson (Illinois politician) =

American politician

Member of the Illinois Senate

Personal details
- Born: 1879 Hancock County, Illinois
- Died: Unknown
- Party: Democratic

James F. Gibson was an American politician who served as a member of the Illinois Senate.
