= Frank A. Landee =

American politician

Frank A. Landee (August 11, 1852 – March 23, 1917) was an American businessman and politician.

Landee was born in Kalman, Sweden. He emigrated to the United States with his brother in 1866 and settled on a farm in Knox County, Illinois. Landee went to school during the winter months and went to a business college in Galesburg, Illinois. He lived in Moline, Illinois with his wife and family and was involved with the Western Union Telegraph Company. He was an inventor and had patents for electrical devices used in the telephone and telegram businesses. Landee was also involved in the banking and grocery businesses. Landee served in the Illinois Senate from 1907 until his death in 1917. Landee died from a stroke while going to his son's home in Metropolis, Illinois. He died at a hospital in Metropolis, Illinois.
