= William M. Brown (Illinois state senator) =

American politician

Member of the Illinois Senate

Personal details
- Born: 1860 Pittsburgh, Pennsylvania
- Died: Unknown
- Party: Republican

William M. Brown was an American politician who served as a member of the Illinois Senate.
