= William F. Calhoun =

American politician (1844–1929)

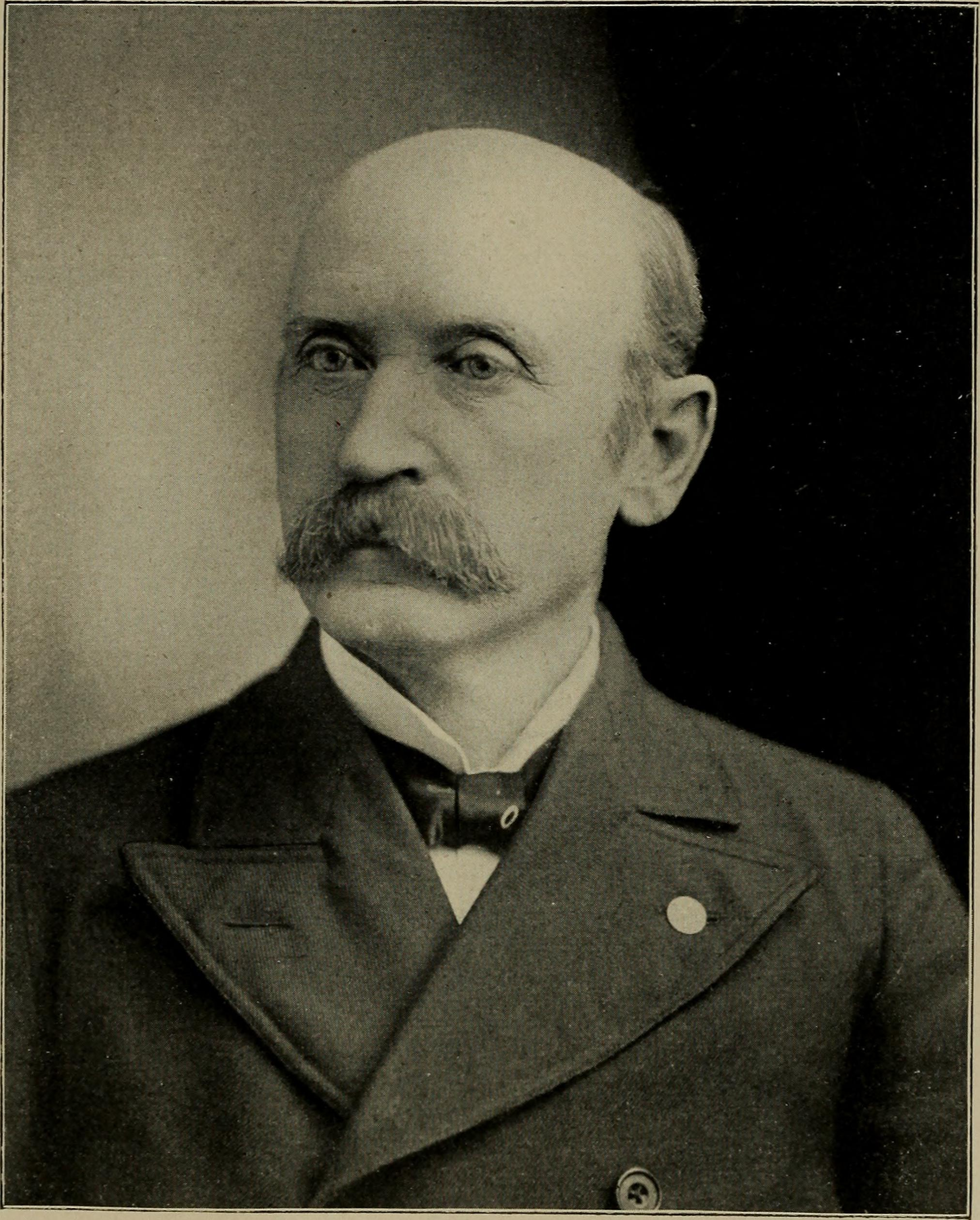

Speaker of the Illinois House of Representatives
- In office 1887–1888

Personal details
- Born: November 21, 1844 Perry County, Pennsylvania
- Died: June 10, 1929 (aged 84) Decatur, Illinois
- Party: Republican
- Occupation: Dentist, politician, newspaper editor, postmaster

William F. Calhoun (November 21, 1844 – June 10, 1929) was a dentist, state legislator, newspaper editor, and postmaster in Illinois. He served as Speaker of the Illinois House of Representatives.

== Biography ==
William F. Calhoun was born in Perry County, Pennsylvania on November 21, 1844. He served in the Union Army during the American Civil War and was a Republican.

His wife was active in the Women's Relief Corps.

He died at his home in Decatur, Illinois on June 10, 1929.
