= John T. Denvir =

American author and politician (1859–1943)

John T. Denvir (1859–1943) was an American champion checker player, chess aficionado, author, and state legislator in Illinois. He served in the state senate from Chicago. He was a Democrat.

John Denvir was elected to the Illinois State Senate from Cicero, Illinois in 1910. Starting with the 47th Illinois General Assembly, John served for twenty years. During his time, John sponsored legislation on mother's pensions, the relief of the blind, and the construction of bridges and canals.

He was also a well-known checkers player who captured the world's title and wrote several books on the game. He published pamphlets and books on checkers including Denvir's Guide to Checkers.

Denvir married Mary V. McCullogh in 1887. They had one son, Robert L. Denvir.

Denvir died in 1943.
