= William Granville Cochran =

American lawyer and politician

William Granville Cochran (November 13, 1844 – February 7, 1932) was an American lawyer and politician.

Cochran was born in Ross County, Ohio. He moved with his parents to Moultrie County, Illinois, in 1849, and eventually settled in Sullivan, Illinois. Cochran served in the 126th Illinois Infantry Regiment during the American Civil War. He studied law and was admitted to the Illinois bar in 1879. He served as Illinois Circuit Court judge. Cochran served in the Illinois House of Representatives from 1889 to 1891 and from 1895 to 1899. He was involved with the Republican Party. He also served as speaker of the house. Cochran died at his daughter's home in Sullivan, Illinois.
