= Illinois's 3rd Senate district =

Illinois’ 3rd Senate district is one of 59 districts in the Illinois Senate. It currently consists of parts of Cook County.

== List of senators ==
Senator	Party	Years	General Assembly (GA)	Electoral history	Counties represented
Jeduthan Hardy			16th 17th		
Hugh Gregg			17th		
Silas Bryan	Democratic		18th		
Waite Talcott			19th 20th		
Zenos Applington			21st 22nd		
Israel Blanchard			23rd		
Daniel Reily			24th 25th		
Samuel K. Casey	Democratic		26th 27th		
William B. Anderson	Independent		27th		
James M. Washburn			27th		
Miles Kehoe	Democratic		28th 29th 30th		
Sylvester Artley	Socialist Labor		31st 32nd		
John H. Clough			33rd 34th		
George A. Gibbs			35th 36th		
George Bass			37th 38th		
Sidney McCloud			39th 40th 41st 42nd		
Michael E. Maher			43rd 44th		
Samuel Ettelson	Republican		45th 46th 47th 48th 49th 50th 51st 52nd 53rd	resigned.	
Adelbert H. Roberts	Republican	1924-1934	53rd 54th 55th 56th 57th 58th	Appointed to the 3rd district	part of Cook
William E. King	Republican	1934–1939	59th 60th		
William A. Wallace	Democratic	1939–1943	61st 62nd		
Christopher C. Wimbish	Democratic	1943-1955	63rd 64th 65th 66th 67th 68th		
Fred J. Smith	Democratic	1955-57	69th		
Jackson L. Boughner	Republican	1957-1959	70th		
John A. Graham	Republican		71st 72nd 73rd 74th 75th 76th		
David J. Regner	Republican		78th 79th 80th 81st		
Donald L. Totten	Republican		82nd		
William A. Marovitz	Democratic		83rd 84th 85th 86th 87th		
Margaret Smith	Democratic		88th 89th 90th 91st 92nd		
Elga L. Jefferies	Democratic		92nd		
Mattie Hunter	Democratic		93rd 94th 95th 96th 97th 98th 99th 100th 101st 102nd 103rd		
