= List of Illinois state legislatures =

The Illinois General Assembly, the legislature of the U.S. state of Illinois, has convened many times since statehood became effective on December 3, 1818.

== Legislatures ==
Number	Name	Convened	Adjourned	Last election
Illinois Constitution of 1818
1	1st Illinois General Assembly	October 4, 1818	March 31, 1819	
2	2nd Illinois General Assembly	December 4, 1820	February 15, 1821	
3	3rd Illinois General Assembly	December 2, 1822	February 18, 1823	
4	4th Illinois General Assembly	November 15, 1824	January 15, 1825	
5	5th Illinois General Assembly	December 4, 1826	February 19, 1827	
6	6th Illinois General Assembly	December 1, 1828	January 23, 1829	
7	7th Illinois General Assembly	December 6, 1830	February 14, 1831	
8	8th Illinois General Assembly	December 3, 1832	March 2, 1833	
9	9th Illinois General Assembly	December 1, 1834 (?)	February 17, 1835 (?)	
10	10th Illinois General Assembly	December 5, 1836	March 6, 1837 (?)	
11	11th Illinois General Assembly	December 3, 1838	March 14, 1839	
12	12th Illinois General Assembly	December 7, 1840 (?)	April 20, 1841	
13	13th Illinois General Assembly	December 5, 1842	May 1, 1843	
14	14th Illinois General Assembly	December 2, 1844	May 5, 1845	
15	15th Illinois General Assembly	December 7, 1846	April 19, 1847	
Illinois Constitution of 1848
16	16th Illinois General Assembly	January 1, 1849	June 14, 1849	
17	17th Illinois General Assembly	January 6, 1851	April 22, 1851	
18	18th Illinois General Assembly	January 3, 1853	April 16, 1853	
19	19th Illinois General Assembly	January 1, 1855	September 20, 1855	
20	20th Illinois General Assembly	January 5, 1857	(?), 1857	
21	21st Illinois General Assembly	January 3, 1859	July 1, 1859	
22	22nd Illinois General Assembly	January 7, 1861	March 14, 1861	
23	23rd Illinois General Assembly	January 5, 1863	July 15, 1863	
24	24th Illinois General Assembly	January 2, 1865	March 17, 1865	
25	25th Illinois General Assembly	January 7, 1867	April 17, 1867	
26	26th Illinois General Assembly	January 4, 1869	September 10, 1869	
Illinois Constitution of 1870
27	27th Illinois General Assembly	January 4, 1871	May 8, 1872	
28	28th Illinois General Assembly	January 8, 1873	March 31, 1874	
29	29th Illinois General Assembly	January 6, 1875	April 15, 1875	
30	30th Illinois General Assembly	January (?), 1877	June 29, 1877	
31	31st Illinois General Assembly	January 8, 1879	May 31, 1879	
32	32nd Illinois General Assembly	January 5, 1881	May 30, 1881	
33	33rd Illinois General Assembly	January 3, 1883	June 18, 1883	
34	34th Illinois General Assembly	January 7, 1885	June 26, 1885	
35	35th Illinois General Assembly	January 5, 1887	June 15, 1887	
36	36th Illinois General Assembly	January 9, 1889	July 1890	
37	37th Illinois General Assembly	January 7, 1891	June 12, 1891	
38	38th Illinois General Assembly	January 4, 1893	June 16, 1893	
39	39th Illinois General Assembly	January 9, 1895	June 14, 1895	
40	40th Illinois General Assembly	January 6, 1897	June 4, 1897	
41	41st Illinois General Assembly	January 4, 1899	April 14, 1899	
42	42nd Illinois General Assembly	January 9, 1901	May 4, 1901	
43	43rd Illinois General Assembly	January 7, 1903	May 7, 1903	
44	44th Illinois General Assembly	January 4, 1905	May 6, 1905	
45	45th Illinois General Assembly	January 9, 1907	October 8, 1907	
46	46th Illinois General Assembly	January 6, 1909	June 4, 1909	
47	47th Illinois General Assembly	January 4, 1911	June 1, 1911	
48	48th Illinois General Assembly	January 8, 1913	June 13, 1913	
49	49th Illinois General Assembly	January 6, 1915	June 30, 1915	
50	50th Illinois General Assembly	January 3, 1917	June 29, 1917	
51	51st Illinois General Assembly	January 8, 1919	June 30, 1919	
52	52nd Illinois General Assembly	1921	1922	
53	53rd Illinois General Assembly	1923	1924	
54	54th Illinois General Assembly	1925	1926	
55	55th Illinois General Assembly	1927	1928	
56	56th Illinois General Assembly	1929	1930	
57	57th Illinois General Assembly	1931	1932	
58	58th Illinois General Assembly	1933	1934	
59	59th Illinois General Assembly	1935	1936	
60	60th Illinois General Assembly	1937	1938	
61	61st Illinois General Assembly	1939	1940	
62	62nd Illinois General Assembly	1941	1942	
63	63rd Illinois General Assembly	1943	1944	
64	64th Illinois General Assembly	1945	1946	
65	65th Illinois General Assembly	1947	1948	
66	66th Illinois General Assembly	1949	1950	
67	67th Illinois General Assembly	1951	1952	
68	68th Illinois General Assembly	1953	1954	
69	69th Illinois General Assembly	1955	1956	
70	70th Illinois General Assembly	1957	1958	
71	71st Illinois General Assembly	1959	1960	
72	72nd Illinois General Assembly	1961	1962	
73	73rd Illinois General Assembly	1963	1964	
74	74th Illinois General Assembly	1965	1966	
75	75th Illinois General Assembly	1967	1968	
76	76th Illinois General Assembly	1969	1970	
Illinois Constitution of 1970
77	77th Illinois General Assembly	1971	1972	
78	78th Illinois General Assembly	1973	1974	
79	79th Illinois General Assembly	1975	1976	
80	80th Illinois General Assembly	1977	1978	
81	81st Illinois General Assembly	1979	1980	
82	82nd Illinois General Assembly	1981	1982	
83	83rd Illinois General Assembly	1983	1984	
84	84th Illinois General Assembly	1985	1986	
85	85th Illinois General Assembly	1987	1988	
86	86th Illinois General Assembly	1989	1990	
87	87th Illinois General Assembly	1991	1992	
88	88th Illinois General Assembly	1993	1994	
89	89th Illinois General Assembly	1995	1996	
90	90th Illinois General Assembly	1997	1998	
91	91st Illinois General Assembly	1999	2000	
92	92nd Illinois General Assembly	2001	2002	
93	93rd Illinois General Assembly	2003	2004	
94	94th Illinois General Assembly	2005	2006	
95	95th Illinois General Assembly	January 14, 2007	January 14, 2009	November 2006: House
96	96th Illinois General Assembly	2009	2010	November 2008: House, Senate
97	97th Illinois General Assembly	2011	2012	November 2010: House, Senate
98	98th Illinois General Assembly	2013	2014	November 2012: House, Senate
99	99th Illinois General Assembly	2015	2016	November 2014: House, Senate
100	100th Illinois General Assembly	January 11, 2017	January 9, 2018	November 2016: House, Senate
101	101st Illinois General Assembly	January 9, 2019	January 13, 2021	November 2018: House, Senate
102	102nd Illinois General Assembly	January 13, 2021	January 10, 2023	November 2020: House, Senate
103	103rd Illinois General Assembly	2023	2024	November 2022: House, Senate
104	104th Illinois General Assembly	2025	2026	November 5, 2024: House, Senate

== See also ==
- List of speakers of the Illinois House of Representatives
- List of presidents of the Illinois Senate
- List of governors of Illinois
- List of lieutenant governors of Illinois
- List of Illinois secretaries of state
- Illinois State Capitol
- Historical outline of Illinois
- Lists of United States state legislative sessions
