= 49th Illinois General Assembly =

1915 to 1917 legislative session

←	48th	50th	→
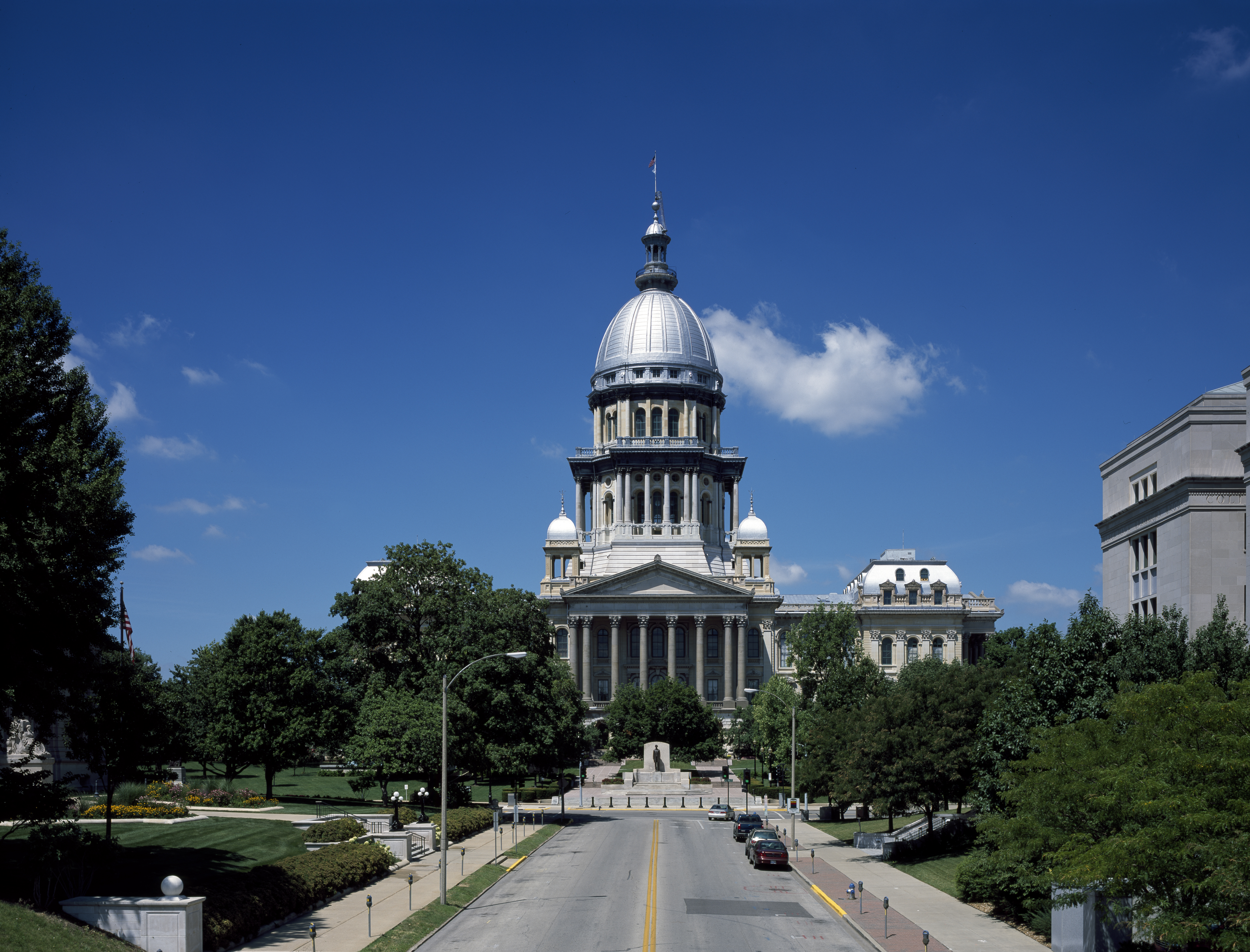
- The Illinois State Capitol

Overview
- Meeting place: Springfield, Illinois
- Term: 1915 – 1916
- Election: 1914

Illinois Senate
- President: Barratt O'Hara, Democratic
- President pro tempore: Stephen D. Canady, Democratic

Illinois House of Representatives
- Speaker: David Shanahan, Republican

The 49th Illinois General Assembly met from 1915 to 1917. The first session convened on January 6, 1915 and adjourned sine die on June 30, 1915. The first special session convened on November 22, 1915 and adjourned sine die on May 10, 1916. The second special session convened on January 11, 1916 and adjourned sine die on February 14, 1916.

Barratt O'Hara of Chicago was the Lieutenant Governor of Illinois and thus ex officio President of the Senate. (Note: This arrangement was discontinued with the adoption of the current Constitution of Illinois in 1970, effective 1973.) Stephen D. Canady of Hillsboro was President pro tempore of the Senate. David Shanahan of Chicago was the Speaker of the House of Representatives. Shanahan was made Temporary Speaker on February 16 after 68 ballots and was made full Speaker on February 17 on the first ballot. In the first session 1,548 bills were introduced, of which 293 became law.

== Districts ==
Illinois was divided into 51 districts, each of which elected one Senator and three Representatives. Districts were last reapportioned in 1901 and would not be reapportioned again until 1947.

The counties of each district were as follows:

- 1st, 2nd, 3rd, 4th, 5th, 6th, 7th, 9th, 11th, 13th, 15th, 17th, 19th, 21st, 23rd, 25th, 27th, 29th, and 31st: Parts of Cook
- 8th: Lake, McHenry, and Boone
- 10th: Ogle and Winnebago
- 12th: Stephenson, Jo Daviess, and Carroll
- 14th: Kane and Kendall
- 16th: Marshall, Putnam, Livingston, and Woodford
- 18th: Peoria
- 20th: Grundy, Kankakee, and Iroquois
- 22nd: Vermillion and Edgar
- 24th: Champaign, Piatt, and Moultrie
- 26th: Ford and McLean
- 28th: DeWitt, Logan, and Macon
- 30th: Tazewell, Mason, Menard, Cass, Schuyler, and Brown
- 32nd: Hancock, McDonough, and Warren
- 33rd: Henderson, Mercer, and Rock Island
- 34th: Douglas, Coles, and Clark
- 35th: Whiteside, Lee, and DeKalb
- 36th: Adams, Pike, Calhoun, and Scott
- 37th: Henry, Stark, and Bureau
- 38th: Greene, Jersey, Macoupin, and Montgomery
- 39th: LaSalle
- 40th: Christian, Shelby, Cumberland, and Fayette
- 41st: DuPage and Will
- 42nd: Clinton, Marion, Clay, and Effingham
- 43rd: Knox and Fulton
- 44th: Jackson, Perry, Washington, Randolph, and Monroe
- 45th: Morgan and Sangamon
- 46th: Jefferson, Wayne, Richland, and Jasper
- 47th: Madison and Bond
- 48th: Hardin, Gallatin, White, Edwards, Wabash, Lawrence, and Crawford
- 49th: St. Clair
- 50th: Hamilton, Saline, Pope, Johnson, and Massac
- 51st: Franklin, Williamson, Union, Pulaski, and Alexander

== Members ==
=== Senate ===
There were 51 senators.

Unless otherwise stated, "Chairman of the Committee on X" is abbreviated to "Chairman of X", etc.

Members of the 49th Illinois General Assembly in the Senate by district
District	Member	Notes
1st	George F. Harding Jr., Republican	Chairman of Revenue and Finance
2nd	Francis A. Hurley, Democratic	
3rd	Samuel A. Ettelson, Democratic	Chairman of License and Miscellany
4th	Al F. Gorman, Democratic	
5th	Morton D. Hull, Republican	Chairman of Public Efficiency and Civil Service, Chairman of Rules
6th	George W. Harris, Progressive	Chairman of Labor, Mines and Mining
7th	Frederick B. Roos, Republican	Chairman of Executive Committee
8th	Albert J. Olson, Republican	Chairman of Agriculture, Live Stock and Dairying
9th	P. J. Carroll, Democratic	
10th	Henry Andrus, Republican	
11th	Percival G. Baldwin, Republican	
12th	Michael H. Cleary, Democratic	
13th	John A. Swanson, Republican	
14th	Thomas B. Stewart, Republican	Chairman of Charitable, Penal and Reformatory Institutions
15th	John J. Boehm, Democratic	
16th	Christian Haase, Democratic	
17th	Edward J. Glackin, Democratic	
18th	John Dailey, Republican	Chairman of Public Utilities
19th	John T. Denvir, Democratic	
20th	Edward C. Curtis, Republican	
21st	Edward J. Hughes, Democratic	
22nd	Martin B. Bailey, Republican	Chairman of Railroads
23rd	Henry W. Austin, Republican	
24th	Raymond B. Meeker, Democratic	
25th	Daniel Herlihy, Democratic	
26th	Noah E. Franklin, Republican	
27th	John Broderick, Democratic	
28th	Willis R. Shaw, Democratic	
29th	Patrick J. Sullivan, Democratic	
30th	Walter I. Manny, Democratic	
31st	Willet H. Cornwell, Republican	
32nd	William A. Compton, Democratic	
33rd	Frank A. Landee, Republican	
34th	John R. Hamilton, Republican	
35th	Adam C. Cliffe, Republican	
36th	Charles R. McNay, Democratic	
37th	Clayton C. Pervier, Republican	
38th	Stephen D. Canady, Democratic	
39th	Peter E. Coleman, Democratic	
40th	F. Jeff Tossey, Democratic	
41st	Richard J. Barr, Republican	
42nd	F. C. Campbell, Democratic	
43rd	W. S. Jewell, Republican	
44th	Kent E. Keller, Democratic	
45th	Elbert S. Smith, Republican	
46th	W. Duff Piercy, Democratic	
47th	J. G. Bardill, Republican	
48th	J. A. Womack, Democratic	
49th	Paul W. Abt, Republican	
50th	D. T. Woodward, Democratic	
51st	Sam W. Latham, Republican	

=== House of Representatives ===
Prior to the Cutback Amendment in 1980, each district in the Illinois House of Representatives elected three members via cumulative voting. There were 79 Republicans, and the rest were mostly Democrats with a few Socialists and Progressives.

Members of the 49th Illinois General Assembly in the House of Representatives by district
District	Member	Notes
1st	John Griffin, Democratic	
1st	William M. Brinkman, Republican	
1st	Sheadrick B. Turner, Republican	
2nd	George U. Lipschulch, Democratic	
2nd	Frank Ryan, Democratic	
2nd	John J. Gardner, Republican	
3rd	John P. Walsh, Democratic	
3rd	Edward M. Santry, Democratic	
3rd	Robert R. Jackson, Republican	
4th	George C. Hilton, Democratic	Chairman of To Visit Penal Institutions
4th	Hubert Killens, Democratic	
4th	Thomas A. Boyer, Republican	
5th	Michael L. Igoe, Democratic	Chairman of Waterways
5th	Isaac S. Rothschild, Republican	
5th	John H. Helwig, Republican	
6th	Joseph A. Weber, Democratic	
6th	Robert E. Wilson, Democratic	
6th	William M. Brown, Republican	
9th	Robert J. Mulcahy, Democratic	
9th	Joseph Placek, Democratic	
9th	David Shanahan, Republican	Elected Speaker
12th	Charles F. Franz, Democratic	
12th	R. R. Thompson, Democratic	
12th	John D. Turnbaugh, Republican	
50th	James H. Felts, Democratic	
50th	Charles Curren, Republican	
50th	C.A. Stewart, Republican	
51st	W.C. Kane, Democratic	
51st	Elwood Barker, Republican	
51st	Oral P. Tuttle, Republican	

== See also ==
- List of Illinois state legislatures

== Bibliography ==
- James Langland, M.A. (1920). The Chicago Daily News Almanac and Year-Book for 1921. Chicago, IL: The Chicago Daily News Company.
- Journal of the House of Representatives of the 49th General Assembly of the State of Illinois. Springfield, IL: Illinois State Journal Co. 1915.
- Journal of the Senate of the first special session of the Forty-Ninth General Assembly of the State of Illinois. Springfield, IL: Illinois State Journal Co. 1916.
- Senate Synopsis, 49th General Assembly, State of Illinois. Springfield, IL: Schnepp and Barnes, State Printers. 1915.
