= Lowell B. Mason =

American politician (1893–1983)

- official portrait photograph, circa 1923

Chairman of the Federal Trade Commission
- In office January 1, 1949 – May 23, 1950
- Preceded by: Robert E. Freer
- Succeeded by: James M. Mead

Member of the Federal Trade Commission
- In office 1945–1956
- Appointed by: Harry S. Truman

Member of the Illinois Senate from the 23rd district
- In office 1923–1931

Personal details
- Born: July 25, 1893
- Died: July 9, 1983 (aged 89)
- Party: Republican
- Spouse(s): Grace Gilbert; Rose D'Amore
- Children: 5
- Parents: William E. Mason (father); Edith J. Mason (mother)
- Education: Northwestern University Law School (LL.B)
- Occupation: Lawyer, politician

Lowell Blake Mason (July 25, 1893 – July 9, 1983) was the chair of the Federal Trade Commission from January 1, 1949, to May 23, 1950. Mason was the last FTC chair to be selected by the Commissioners, rather than being designated by the President of the United States. He also served in the Illinois Senate and on the Illinois State Aviation Commission.

== Early life and education ==
Mason was in Chicago, Illinois on July 25, 1893. He was the youngest of six children of William E. Mason and Edith J. Mason. His father represented Chicago in the United States House of Representatives, and as a result of his political Mason grew up living in both Chicago and Washington, D.C. In Chicago, their family attended the Third Unitarian Church in Oak Park, Illinois. The church's minister James Vila Blake was Mason's namesake. Mason was educated in Chicago's common schools (Chicago Public Schools).

After his father came into a surplus of money after representing the prevailing party in an important legal case, Mason had the opportunity join his mother, two of his siblings, and his aunt on a "circumnavigation" trip around the world.

Mason received an LL.B. from Northwestern University in 1916.

== Career ==
Mason was admitted to the bar in Illinois in 1916. From about 1916 to 1922, he served as Assistant Corporation Counsel for the City of Chicago.

From 1923 to 1931, Mason served in the Illinois Senate, to which he was first elected to as a Republican in 1922. He served during the 53rd, 54th, 55th, and 56th Illinois General Assemblys.

Mason was elected to the first Illinois State Aviation Commission in 1927, and became General Counsel to the National Industrial Review Board in 1934, and counsel to the Senate Judiciary Subcommittee investigating the National Recovery Act the following year. Around 1938, he began to represent the Washington Senators baseball team.

In 1945, President Harry S. Truman appointed Mason to the Federal Trade Commission, and re-appointed him to a seven-year term in 1949. He served until 1956. From January 1, 1949, until May 23, 1950, he was the commission's chairman. Mason was the last FTC chair to be selected by the Commissioners, rather than being designated by the President of the United States.

After leaving the FTC, he practiced law until 1970.

Mason was the author of a number of books and articles over the course of his career.

== Personal life ==
As an adult, Mason resided in Oak Park.

In 1916, Mason married his first wife, Grace Gilbert. They had four children: William E. Mason III, Barbara Grace Mason, Nancy Gilbert Mason, and Lowell B. Mason Jr.

On June 14, 1954, Mason received an honorary Doctor of Laws degree from Northwestern University. In 1938, he married his second wife, Rose D'Amore. They had one child: Bianca Bason. D'Amore's other daughter, Jimilu, whom she had had previous to her and Mason's marriage, adopted Mason's surname.

Mason was a close friend of President Harry S. Truman since Truman's days as a senator.

Mason died on July 9, 1983 at Birch Manor Nursing Home in Oak Park, at the age of 89.

== External sources ==
- Lowell B. Mason Oral History Interview –Harry S. Truman Presidential Library

Political offices
Preceded by Robert E. Freer	Chairmen of the Federal Trade Commission; 1949–1950	Succeeded by James M. Mead
