= Louis O. Williams =

American politician

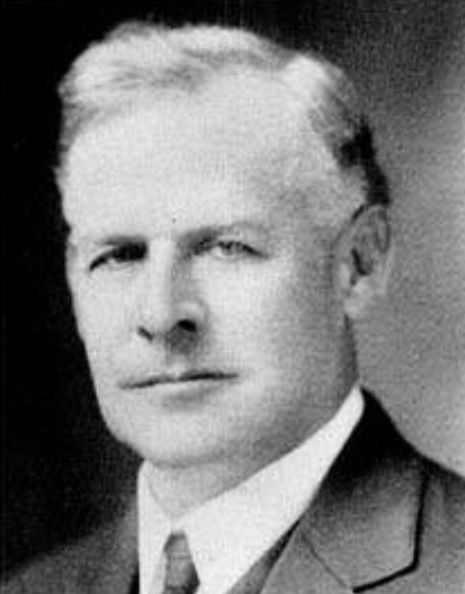

Member of the Illinois Senate
- In office 1933 – March 19, 1937
- Preceded by: Charles E. Lee

Personal details
- Born: February 22, 1874 DeWitt County, Illinois
- Died: March 19, 1937 (aged 63) Buffalo, Illinois

Louis O. Williams was an American politician who served as a member of the Illinois Senate representing the 28th District in the 58th, 59th, and 60th Illinois General Assembles.

== Biography ==
Williams was born in DeWitt County, Illinois on February 22, 1874. He was of Welsh descent.

In the 1928 general election, Williams was defeated by Republican incumbent Charles E. Lee by a large margin to the 28th district seat, representing Macon, DeWitt, and Logan counties. He was elected to the Illinois Senate in 1932 and re-elected in 1936.

He died in office on March 19, 1937 due to injuries sustained in a car accident in Buffalo, Illinois.
