= Charles H. Thompson (Illinois judge) =

American judge (1882–1972)

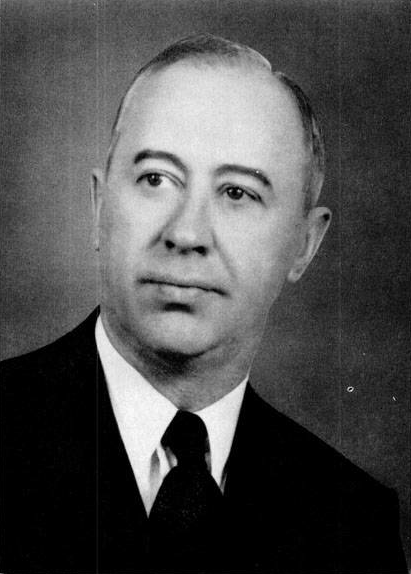
- Thompson's official photograph, c. 1945

Chief Justice of the Supreme Court of Illinois
- In office 1949–1950
- In office 1945–1946

Justice of the Supreme Court of Illinois from the 1st district
- In office 1942–1951
- Preceded by: Paul Farthing

Member of the Illinois State Senate
- In office 1937–1942
- In office 1927–1933

State's Attorney of Saline County, Illinois
- In office 1920–1924

Personal details
- Born: November 11, 1882 near Mount Vernon, Illinois
- Died: November 26, 1972 (aged 90)
- Resting place: Sunset Hill Cemetery in Harrisburg, Illinois
- Party: Republican
- Spouse: Ethel K. Knight (m. 1914; died 1967)
- Education: Chicago-Kent College of Law

Charles Henry Thompson (December 11, 1882 – November 26, 1972) is an American politician and judge who served as a justice of the Supreme Court of Illinois (1942–1951) and a member of the Illinois State Senate (1927–1933, 1937–1942), and the state's attorney of Saline County, Illinois (1920–1924). While on the state supreme court, he was twice the court's chief justice (1945–1946, 1949–1950).

== Early life and education ==
Thompson was born on December 11, 1882 near Mount Vernon, Posey County, Indiana to Lewis (also known as Louis) Thompson, a farmer, and his wife Emma Monroe Thompson. In 1884, he and his family moved to Harrisburg in Saline County, Illinois. By 1910, his father had begun mining coal, and Charles was working as a bookkeeper in the coal office. In 1914, Charles married Ethel K. Knight of Harrisburg.

Thompson left Harrisburg to attend law school in Chicago. He graduated from the Chicago-Kent College of Law (1918) and was admitted to the Illinois Bar in 1919. While in law school, he worked as a law clerk and a stenographer.

== Political and legal career (1920–19 ==
Thompson returned to Harrisburg to practice law. Soon after, he entered politics and was elected in 1920 as the state's attorney (county prosecutor) of Saline County. He held this office from that year until 1924.

In 1926, he was elected as a Republican to represent the 51st district in the Illinois State Senate. He held this seat from 1927 through 1933 (during the 55th, 56th and 57th iterations of the Illinois General Assembly).

Additionally, from 1929 until 1932, he was a member of the Lincoln Memorial Commission. In 1933 and 1934, he served as a member of the Illinois Century of Progress Commission, overseeing aspects related to the Century of Progress (a world's exhibition in Chicago).

From 1936 to 1937, he served as president of the Federation of Local Bar Associations chapter for Illinois' first supreme judicial district.

Thompson again served in the state from 1937 up until after his 1942 election to the state supreme court (during the 61st and 62nd iterations of the General Assembly).

== Supreme Court of Illinois (1942–1951) ==
In 1942, Thompson won election to a first district seat on the Supreme Court of Illinois. He served until retiring from the court in 1951. Twice during his judgeship, he was the court's chief justice (first in 1945 and 1946; again in 1949 and 1950).

== Later career ==
After retiring from the court, Thompson returned to practicing law in Harrisburg.

== Personal life ==
Thompson was a member of the First United Methodist Church in Harrisburg, and also a member of the Harrisburg Masonic Lodge and Knights Templar.

In 1914, Thompson married Ethel K. Knight. He was widowed on November 3, 1967, when she died. Thompson died on November 26, 1972, and was buried at Sunset Hill Cemetery in Harrisburg, where his late wife had been buried years earlier.
