= Martin R. Carlson =

American politician

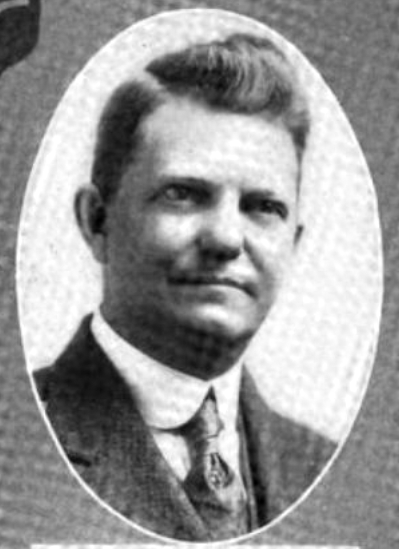

Member of the Illinois Senate
- In office 1920–1935

Personal details
- Born: May 2, 1877 Moline, Illinois
- Died: April 7, 1971 (aged 93) Moline, Illinois
- Party: Republican
- Spouse: Dr. Hada Burkhard
- Occupation: Farmer, businessman, politician

Martin R. Carlson (May 2, 1877 – April 7, 1971) was an American politician and businessman who served as the mayor of Moline, Illinois, from 1911 to 1918 and a member of the Illinois Senate for the 33rd district from 1919 to 1935. A Republican, he served as the President pro tempore of the Illinois Senate from 1929 to 1931 and briefly served as acting Governor in 1929.

Born to Moline native Olive M. (née Wickstrom) and Swede G. F. Oscar Carlson, he established a stationery business with his brother in Moline in 1898, and married Dr. Hada Burkhard during his second term as mayor. He had previously served on the Rock Island County Board of Supervisors, and was President of the John Ericson Republican League of Illinois. Burkhard died in 1949 and Carlson died on April 7, 1971.

== Bibliography ==
- Emmerson, Louis L., ed. (1923). Blue Book of the State of Illinois 1923-1924. Springfield, Illinois: Illinois State Journal Co.
- Setterdahl, Lily (2003). Swedes in Moline, Illinois:1847-2002. uPUBLISH.com: Universal Publishers. ISBN 1-58112-582-8.
