= 69th Illinois General Assembly =

1955 legislative session

The 69th Illinois General Assembly convened on January 5, 1955, and adjourned sine die on June 30, 1955. The General Assembly consists of the Illinois House of Representatives and the Illinois Senate.

== Legislation ==
The 69th General Assembly introduced 2,158 bills, 1,279 in the House and 879 in the Senate. Of these, 1,162 were passed by both houses and sent to the governor. Governor William Stratton vetoed 182 in their entirety and 7 in part.
