= Sangamon County Courthouse =

Local government building in the United States

Coordinates: 39°48′0″N 89°38′34.6″W

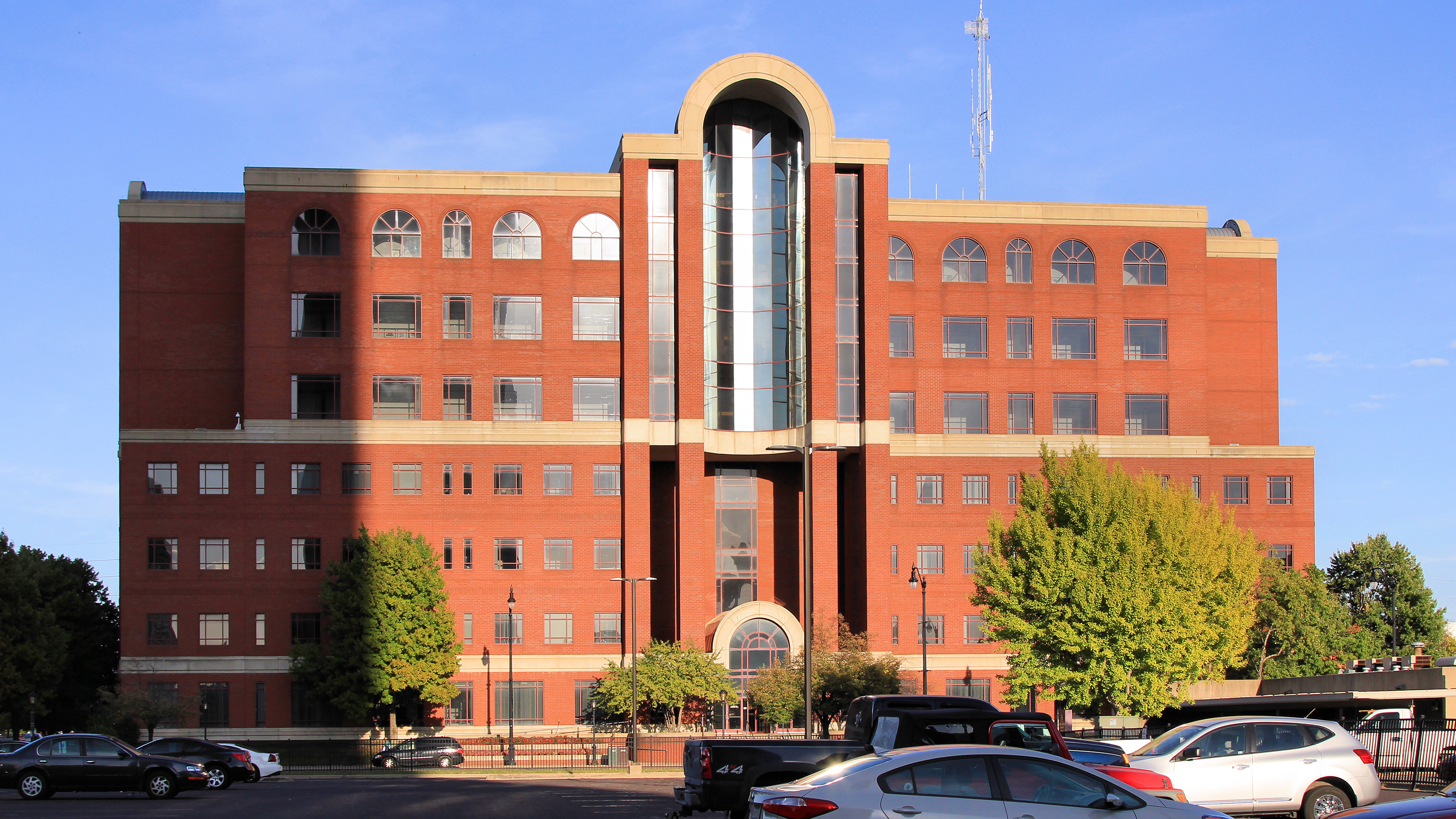
Sangamon County Courts Complex

The Sangamon County Courts Complex, located at 200 S. 9th Street in Springfield, is the county courthouse serving Sangamon County, Illinois. The complex is made up of two adjacent buildings, one used for county offices and courtroom operations and the other one housing the sheriff's office and county jail. Both buildings have secured entrances/exits, as well as internal security separating the two buildings.

== Description ==
The 340,000 ft^{2} Courts Complex contains offices and support spaces designed to house the operations of 27 separate departments and offices of Sangamon County government. The Complex also houses the meeting room of the Sangamon County Board, the county legislative body. The Courts Complex centers on the work of local justice and the judiciary, and the complex contains court rooms, court support spaces, the sheriff's office and the county jail. The Sangamon County jail has 314 beds for persons awaiting trial or sentenced to short terms of imprisonment for misdemeanors.

The complex was designed by FWAI Architects Inc. The architectural style is functionalist, with exterior postmodern detailing on the west entrance facade.
