= 67th Illinois General Assembly =

1951 legislative session

The 67th Illinois General Assembly convened on January 3, 1951, and adjourned sine die on June 30, 1951. The General Assembly consists of the Illinois House of Representatives and the Illinois Senate.

== Legislation ==
The 67th General Assembly introduced 2,044 bills, 1,258 in the House and 786 in the Senate. Of these, 1,040 were passed by both houses and sent to the governor. Governor Adlai Stevenson II vetoed 134 in their entirety and 7 in part.
