= Robert Scholes (politician) =

American politician and lawyer

48th Speaker of the Illinois House of Representatives
- In office January 7, 1925 – January 9, 1929
- Preceded by: David Shanahan
- Succeeded by: David Shanahan

Personal details
- Born: Robert Scholes; December 5, 1866 Peoria, Illinois
- Died: October 23, 1929 (aged 62) Peoria, Illinois
- Party: Republican
- Spouse: Ida Mae Partridge
- Children: 1

Robert Scholes (December 5, 1866 – October 23, 1929) was an American politician and lawyer.

Born in Peoria, Illinois, Scholes was admitted to the Illinois bar in 1899 and then practiced law in Peoria. From 1904 to 1912, Scholes was state's attorney for Peoria County, Illinois and was a Republican. From 1917 until his death in 1929, Scholes served in the Illinois House of Representatives and was twice speaker of the house in 1925 and 1927. Scholes died in his home, in Peoria, Illinois, from a heart ailment and ill health.
