= Stephen D. Canady =

American businessman and politician

Stephen D. Canady (March 3, 1865–August 23, 1923) was an American businessman and politician.

Canady was born on a farm neat Litchfield, Illinois. He graduated from Litchfield High School in 1886. Canady lived in Hillsboro, Illinois with his wife and family. He was involved in the real estate and abstract businesses. He served as clerk of Hillsboro, Illinois and as deputy clerk for Montgomery County, Illinois. Canady was a Democrat. He served in the Illinois House of Representatives from 1905 to 1909 and from 1911 to 1913. Canady then served in the Illinois Senate from 1913 to 1921. Canady died suddenly at the Hillsboro Hospital in Hillsboro, Illinois.
