= 65th Illinois General Assembly =

1947 Illinois state legislative session

The 65th Illinois General Assembly convened on January 8, 1947, and adjourned sine die on June 30, 1947. The General Assembly consists of the Illinois House of Representatives and the Illinois Senate.

== Legislation ==
The 65th General Assembly introduced 1,675 bills. Of these, 738 were passed by both houses and sent to the governor. Governor Dwight H. Green vetoed 37 bills with 701 enacted into law.
