= 68th Illinois General Assembly =

1953 legislative session

The 68th Illinois General Assembly convened on January 7, 1953, and adjourned sine die on June 27, 1953. The General Assembly consists of the Illinois House of Representatives and the Illinois Senate.

== Legislation ==
The 68th General Assembly introduced 2,158 bills, 1,004 in the House and 661 in the Senate. Of these, 941 were passed by both houses and sent to the governor. Governor William Stratton vetoed 136 in their entirety and 7 in part.
