= 70th Illinois General Assembly =

1957 legislative session

The 70th Illinois General Assembly convened on January 9, 1957, and adjourned sine die on June 29, 1957. The General Assembly consists of the Illinois House of Representatives and the Illinois Senate.

== Reapportionment ==
The 70th General Assembly was the first to be reapportioned since 1901. Since 1901, Senate and House districts were contiguous, comprising 51 districts each represented by one senator and three representatives. The new redistricting consists of 58 Senatorial districts and 59 Representative districts increasing membership in the Senate to 58 and in the House from 204 to 235.

== Legislation ==
The 70th General Assembly introduced 2,314 bills, 1,415 in the House and 899 in the Senate. Of these, 1,313 were passed by both houses and sent to the governor. Governor William Stratton vetoed 124 in their entirety and 6 in part.
