= 66th Illinois General Assembly =

1949 legislative session

The 66th Illinois General Assembly convened on January 5, 1949, and adjourned sine die on June 30, 1949. The General Assembly consists of the Illinois House of Representatives and the Illinois Senate.

== Legislation ==
The 66th General Assembly introduced 1,825 bills. Of these, 833 were passed by both houses and sent to the governor. Governor Adlai Stevenson II vetoed 66 in their entirety and 5 in part.
