= Richey V. Graham =

American politician and lawyer

Richey V. Graham (November 22, 1886 – July 3, 1972) was an American politician and lawyer.

Born in Galt, Ontario, Graham was educated in public schools in Chicago, Illinois. He went to Danville Military Institute in Danville, Virginia and served in the United States Army during World War I. After completing his bachelor's degree at the University of Wisconsin, he earned a law degree from Chicago-Kent College of Law. He practiced law in Chicago and was involved in the savings and loan business.

Graham served as the superintendent of the house of corrections from 1924 to 1927 and as the assistant to the president of the Cook County Board of Commissioners from 1927 to 1929.

Graham was a Democrat. From 1929 to 1931, he served in the Illinois House of Representatives. He then served in the Illinois Senate from 1931 to 1939. He was married to Lillian Cermak, the daughter of Mayor Anton Cermak of Chicago.

He died in Oak Forest, Illinois.
