= Richard J. Barr =

American politician and lawyer

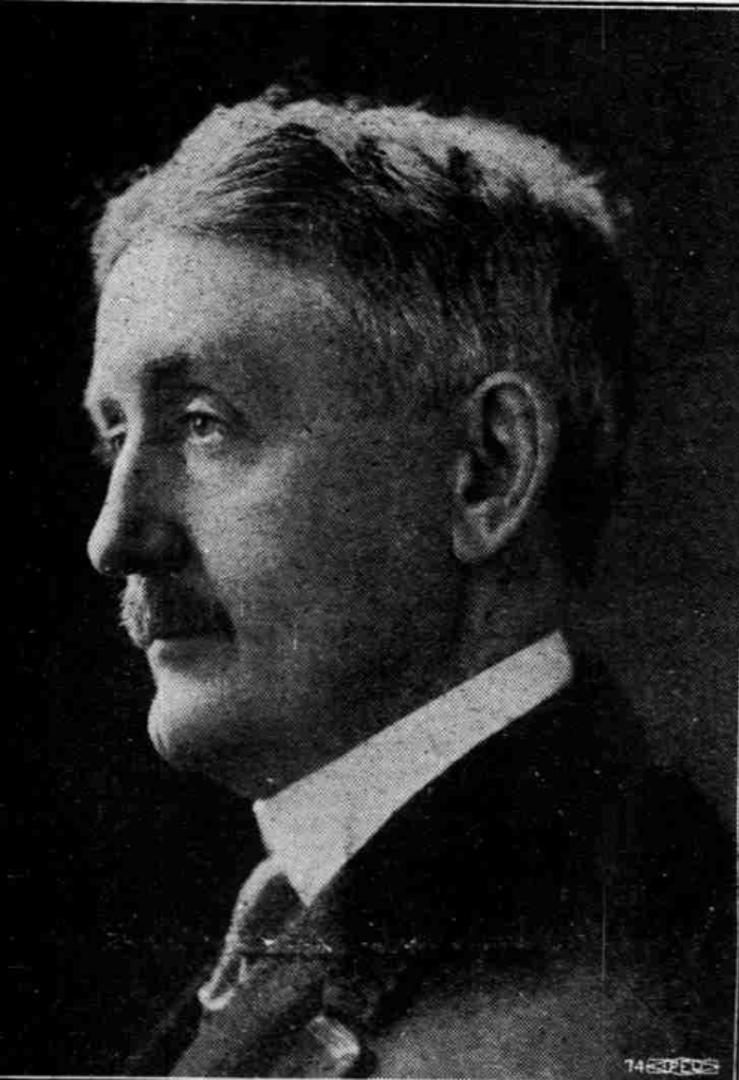
- Headshot of Barr from The Broad Ax

Member of the Illinois State Senate from the 41st district
- In office 1903–1951
- Preceded by: District created
- Succeeded by: Lottie Holman O'Neill

Personal details
- Born: Richard James Barr; November 28, 1865 Wilton Center, Illinois
- Died: June 11, 1951 (aged 85) Joliet, Illinois
- Party: Republican
- Children: William G. Barr
- Education: University of Illinois; University of Michigan Law School
- Occupation: Lawyer, politician

Richard James Barr (November 28, 1865 – June 11, 1951) was an American politician and lawyer.

== Biography ==
Born in Wilton Center, Will County, Illinois, Barr went to University of Illinois and then received his law degree from University of Michigan Law School. He was admitted to the Illinois bar and practiced law in Joliet, Illinois. He served as Joliet city attorney and was mayor of Joliet.

The 41st district was created by the 1901 reapportionment process and included DuPage and Will counties. Barr was elected to represent this district in the 1902 general election. From 1903 until 1951, Barr served in the Illinois State Senate and was a Republican. As the legislature was never reapportioned during his time, Barr would represent this district as-is for his entire tenure. Previously, Will County was in the 25th district.

In the 1903 Joliet mayoral election, Democratic candidate William C. Crollus defeated Barr's reelection effort. He served as the president pro tempore of the Illinois Senate during the 53rd, 54th, and 55th General Assemblies. Barr died in a hospital in Joliet, Illinois. He died on June 11, 1951. His son William G. Barr also served in the Illinois General Assembly.

== See also ==
- List of mayors of Joliet, Illinois
