= Adjournment sine die =

Meeting closed without a date to reconvene

Adjournment sine die (pronounced SEE-nay DEE-ay) (Latin for "without a date") is the conclusion of a meeting by a deliberative assembly, such as a legislature or organizational board, without setting a date to reconvene. The assembly can reconvene, either in its present form or a reconstituted form, if preexisting laws and rules provide for this; otherwise, the adjournment effectively dissolves the assembly.A court may also adjourn a matter sine die, which means that the matter is stayed until further notice. In a sine die adjournment of this type, the hearing stands open indefinitely, and could theoretically be resumed if the situation changed.

== United States usage ==
The Congress of the United States customarily adjourns a session sine die on the morning of January 3, immediately before the next session holds its constitutionally mandated first meeting. It can also adjourn sine die at other times through a concurrent resolution that allows the Speaker of the House and Senate Majority Leader to resume the session.

State legislatures follow suit and mark adjournment sine die with a ceremony, such as the Connecticut General Assembly wherein, on the final day of the legislative session, the House and Senate meet in a joint convention, and the Secretary of the State recites "Oyez, Oyez, Oyez", pounds the gavel, and declares the legislature adjourned sine die.

In the Florida Legislature, the sergeants-at-arms of the Florida Senate and the Florida House of Representatives step outside their chambers each holding a handkerchief. When they meet in between the chambers, they both drop the handkerchiefs, signifying the end of the legislative session.

== Hong Kong usage ==
On 28 June 1997, Andrew Wong, President of the last Legislative Council of Hong Kong as a British crown colony, which was to be dissolved by the incoming sovereign power over Hong Kong, the People's Republic of China, and replaced by a provisional legislature, declared at the end of its last session: "In accordance with the Standing Orders of the Legislative Council, I now adjourn the Council, sine die."
