= David Shanahan (politician) =

Illinois state legislator (1862-1936)

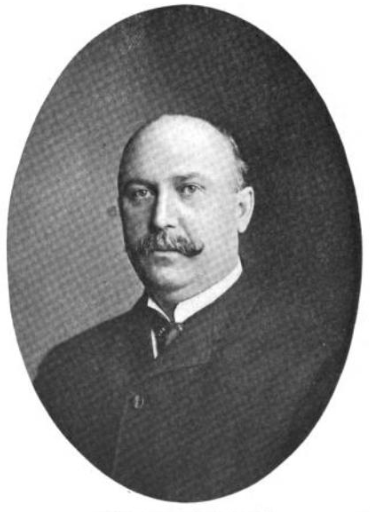

Member of the Illinois House of Representatives
- In office 1894–1936

Personal details
- Born: David E. Shanahan; September 7, 1862 Lee County, Illinois
- Died: October 18, 1936 (aged 74) Chicago, Illinois
- Party: Republican
- Occupation: Politician

David E. Shanahan (September 7, 1862 – October 18, 1936), Illinois Republican state legislator and political leader, was born on a farm in Lee County, Illinois. His parents moved back to Chicago when he was just three months old and he lived there for the rest of his life. Mr. Shanahan graduated from Holden Grammar School, South Division High School, and Chicago Law College.

In 1885 he was elected South Town Supervisor. In 1915 he was a member of the Illinois Commission to the Panama-Pacific Exposition at San Francisco. He served on the State Council of Defense during World War I and the Illinois Commission for A Century of Progress Exposition 1933–1934. In 1919 he was elected to the Illinois Constitutional Convention. He was a member of the Chicago Real Estate Board, the Union League Club, and numerous civic organizations.

Mr. Shanahan was first elected to the Illinois House of Representatives in 1894 from the Bridgeport neighborhood on Chicago's South Side and was re-elected every two years until his last election in 1934. He was serving in office when he died on October 18, 1936. He served several different terms as Speaker of the House including 1915–1921, 1923–1925, and 1929–1933. Rep. Shanahan's death in 1936 came just a few weeks before the general election with his name still on the ballot. Because the maximum of two Democrats had already been nominated from Bridgeport for the 1936 election, a third Democrat, future Mayor Richard J. Daley, ran for and was elected to the late Rep. Shanahan's seat technically on the Republican line. But Daley immediately joined the House Democratic Caucus upon his taking office in Springfield in January 1937.

Rep. Shanahan was a real estate investor whose estate topped one million dollars in 1936, a large sum for the Depression era. There was an extensive battle in court for the estate when his will was contested and it was discovered that he had a "secret marriage" late in his life to one of his secretaries.
