= Illinois State Capitol =

State capitol building of the U.S. state of Illinois

- U.S. National Register of Historic Places
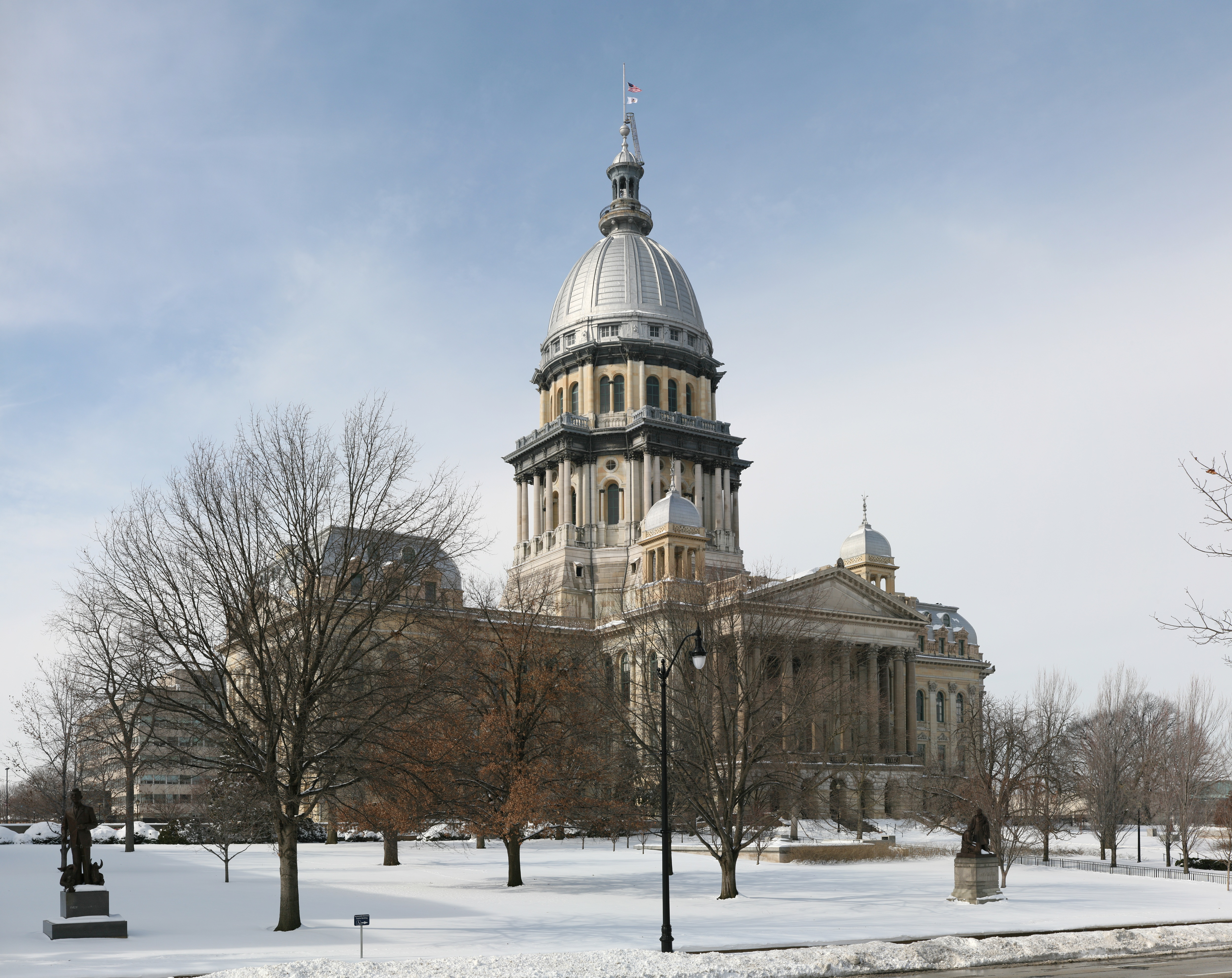
- East façade of the Capitol from Second Street

- Location within Illinois Location within the United States
- Interactive map showing Illinois State Capitol's location
- Location: Capitol Avenue and Second Street; Springfield, Illinois
- Coordinates: 39°47′54″N 89°39′17″W
- Area: 9 acres (3.6 ha)
- Built: 1888; 138 years ago
- Architect: Alfred H. Piquenard, et al.
- Architectural style: Renaissance Revival Second Empire
- NRHP reference No.: 85003178
- Added to NRHP: November 21, 1985; 40 years ago

The Illinois State Capitol, located in Springfield, Illinois, houses the legislative and executive branches of the government of the U.S. state of Illinois. Becoming the seat of the legislature in 1876, the current building is the sixth to serve as the capitol building since Illinois was admitted to the United States in 1818. Built in the architectural styles of the French Renaissance and Italianate, it was designed by Cochrane and Garnsey, an architectural and design firm based in Chicago. Ground was broken for the new capitol structure on March 11, 1868, and the building was completed twenty years later for a total cost of $4.5 million.

The building contains the two legislative chambers for the bicameral General Assembly of Illinois, which is made up of the lower chamber of the Illinois House of Representatives and the upper house of the Illinois Senate. A ceremonial office for the Governor of Illinois and additional executive branch offices, additional offices for legislators and staff, plus conference and committee rooms are also in the landmarked building. The Illinois Capitol's footprint is cross-shaped, with four equal wings. Its tall central rotunda and upper dome and tower roofs are covered in zinc metal alloy to provide a silvery facade which does not weather or corrode. (Zinc mining was productive in the state throughout the 18th and 19th centuries.) Architectural scholar Jean A. Follett describes it as a building that "is monumental in scale and rich in detail." The interior of the dome features a plaster circular frieze painted to resemble bronze, which illustrates scenes from Illinois state history, and stained glass windows, including a stained glass replica of the Illinois state seal in the center-top oculus of the dome, above the rotunda.

== Description ==
With a total height of 361 feet (110 m), or 405 feet (123 m) including its flagpole, the Illinois Capitol is the tallest non-skyscraper capitol structure in the United States, even exceeding the height of the United States Capitol with its dome in Washington, D.C. (Note: In contrast, the shortest skyscraper-style tower state capitol is the North Dakota State Capitol in Bismarck, stands a mere 241.67 feet (73.66 m) tall. The only other state capitols taller than Illinois are the high-rise designs of the Louisiana State Capitol in Baton Rouge and the Nebraska State Capitol in Lincoln, whose governments opted for more modern unique structures, without traditional neo-classical / classical revival domes or towers.) The dome itself of the State Capitol in Springfield is 92.5 ft (28.2 m) wide, and is supported by underground solid bedrock, 25.5 ft (7.8 m) below the surface. It is the highest building in surrounding Sangamon County in terms of total elevation; although the Wyndham Springfield City Centre building in downtown Springfield is taller than the top of the Capitol, it is on lower ground, making the Capitol building higher. A Springfield city statute currently does not allow buildings to be constructed in the state capital city higher than the Illinois State Capitol.. Each of the four wings of the building is aligned to the 4 major compass directions; from the north end to the south end the building measures 379 ft (116 m) and from the east end to the west end 268 ft (82 m). The capitol occupies a nine-acre plot of land that forms the surrounding Capitol Grounds. William Douglas Richardson served as one of the principal contractors for the 1868 to 1888 construction project of the Illinois Capitol, and Jacob Bunn, an in-law of W. D. Richardson, served as chairman of the capitol construction steering committee.

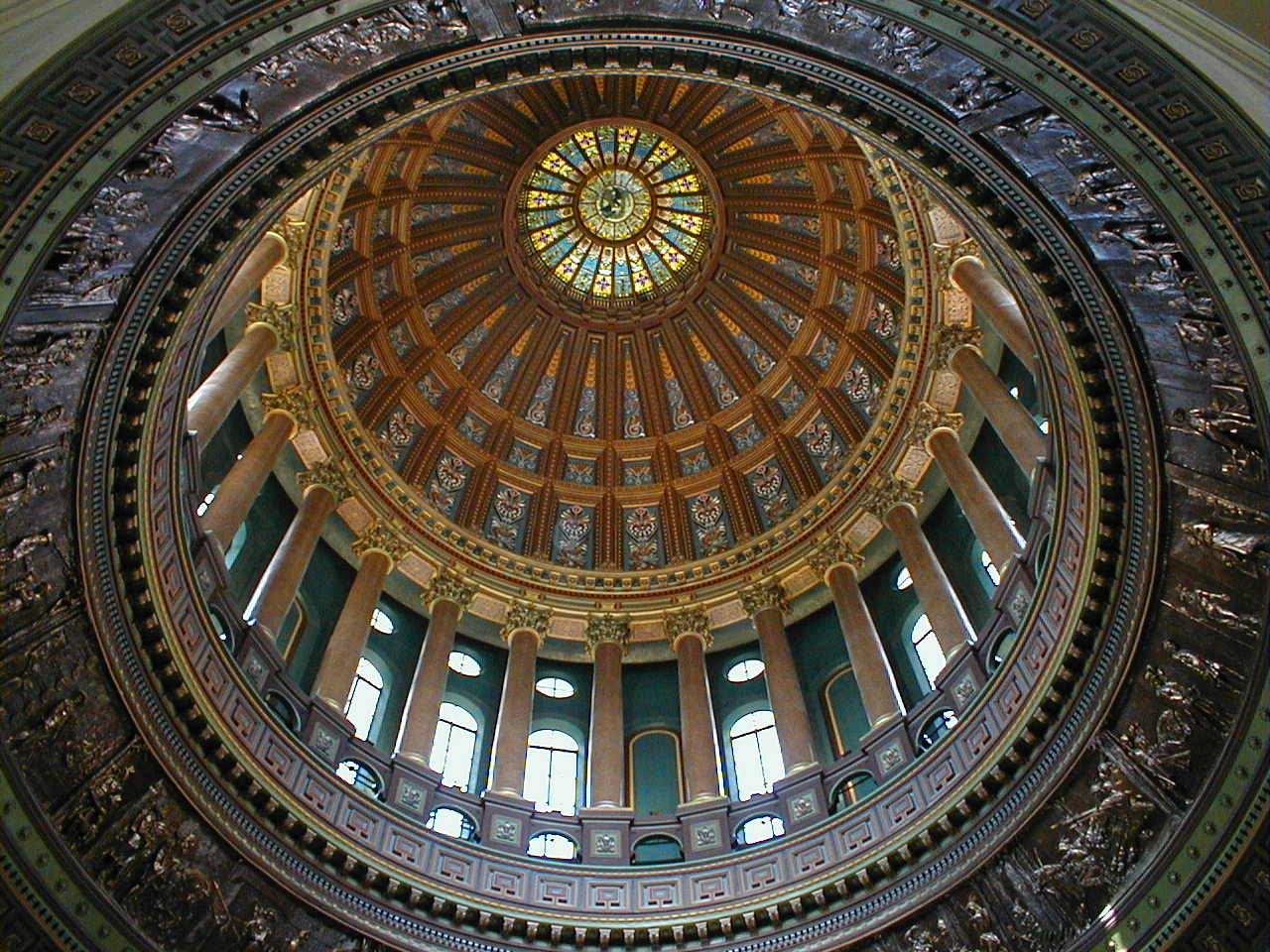
Detail of the dome interior

When the Capitol in Springfield was constructed, several empty shafts were included for the future installation of elevators. The original water-operated elevators were installed the year before the building's completion in 1887 and were sometimes the subject of ridicule by local newspapers as they were deemed inadequate for a building with the prestige of the State Capitol. Electric elevators were later installed sometime before 1939 when the state legislature appropriated $30,000 for their repair.

== Renovation ==
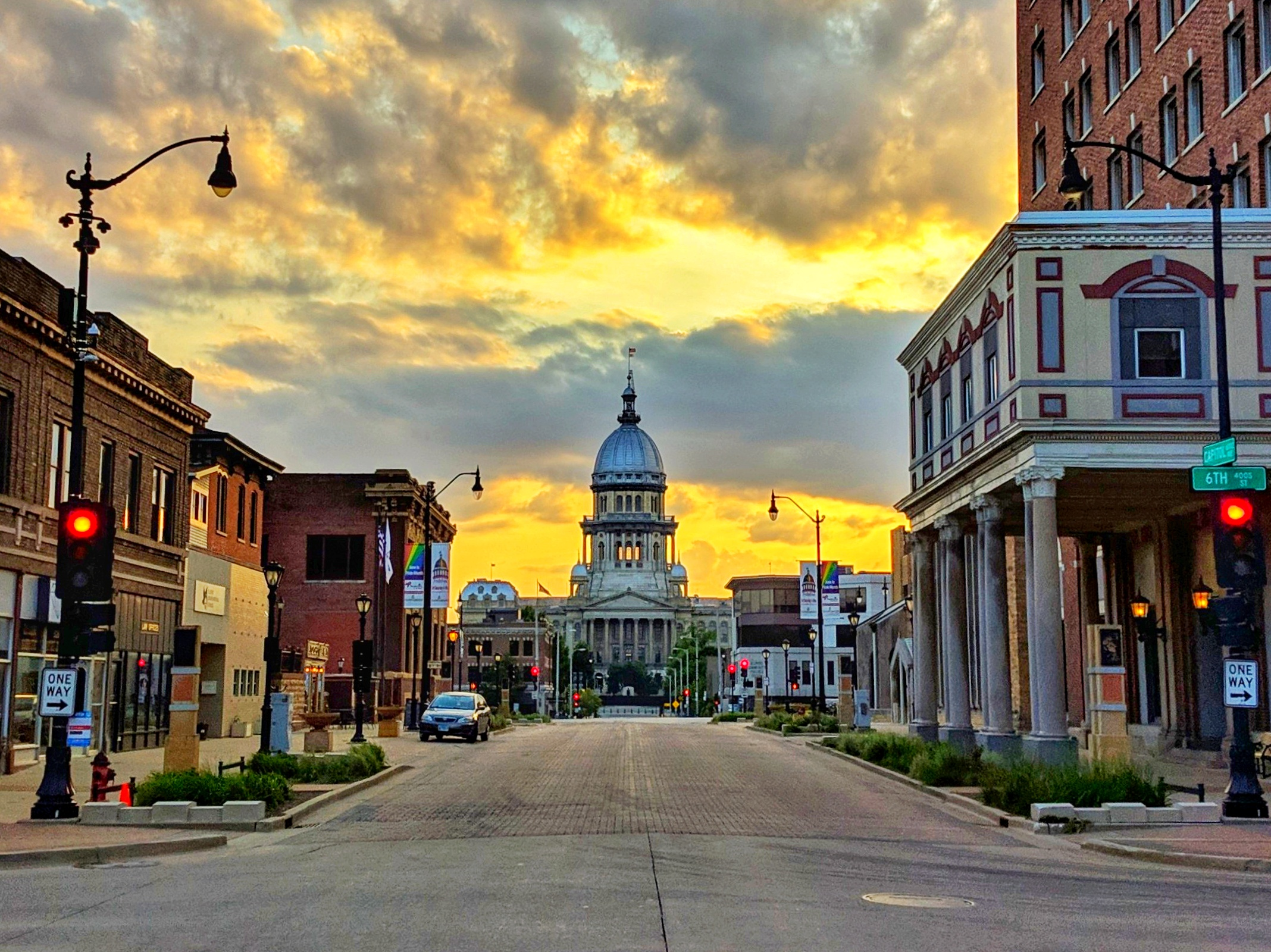
Looking west on East Capitol Avenue in the state capital city of Springfield towards the Illinois State Capitol in the distance at the evening sunset

In the second decade of the 21st century in 2011, the then 123 year old Capitol underwent a $50 million renovation and updating project. It was primarily focused on the west wing, to upgrade its life safety, complying with the earlier Americans with Disabilities Act of 1990 for modern handicapped persons accessibility and reworking utility mechanical, electrical and plumbing infrastructure of the century and a quarter old building as well as architectural improvements to bring the capitol closer to its original 1870s / 1880s appearance, the "period of significance" for the monumental building. Improvements included cleaning and refinishing of interior walls and ceilings, along with exposed brick arches in the basement; installation of maiden lamp posts for the grand staircase, new chandeliers, and copper-clad exterior doors; and removal of a second floor mezzanine level.

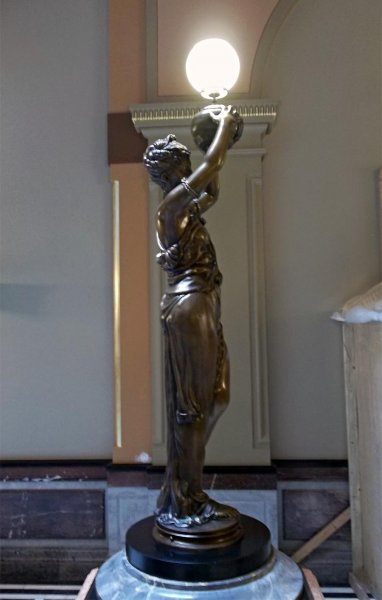
One of the pair of female sculpture statues replicas added to the west wing staircase in the Illinois State Capitol in Springfield as part of the $50 million renovation project from 2011–2013, from the original architectural decorative planned design of 1868–1888.

The addition of the maiden statues is particularly notable, since they had been originally sculpted and intended for the building since construction began in 1868, continuing into the subsequent 1870s when architect Alfred Piquenard designed them as part of his original plan for interior decoration. Piquenard was also coincidentally architect for the neighboring Iowa State Capitol being built in Des Moines, which is of a similar architectural style, albeit only 3/4 of the larger size building in Springfield. Illinois legislators in the 1870s thought the scantily-clad women statues too risqué, so plain lamps were installed at the base of its grand staircase railings, and the maiden lamps originally intended for Illinois were instead installed at the Iowa State Capitol in Des Moines, where they remain to this day. The replica lamps of sculpture statues now installed at Illinois as part of this renovation are copies of those from the 19th century at Iowa's Capitol (in exile for 136 years from Illinois).

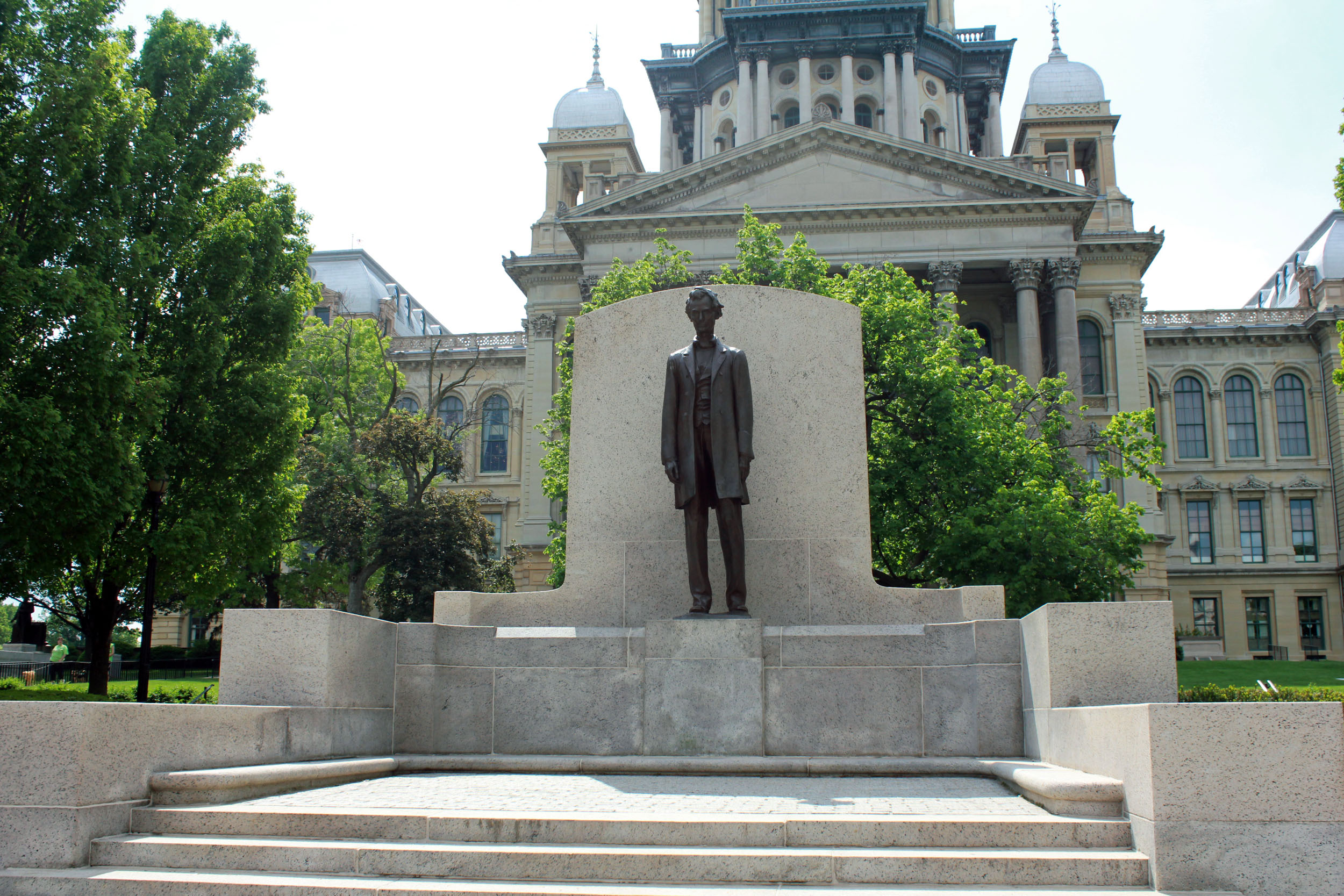
Lincoln by Andrew O'Connor (1918) at East Front of Capitol

The year after completion of the 2-years long Illinois Capitol west wing project in 2014, the renovation achieved "LEED" Gold certification approval under the U.S. Green Building Council's New Construction and Major Renovation program.

Eight years later, in December 2021, state officials began another second phase of a similar renovation program at the Illinois Capitol. This time focused on the north wing that will cost eventually of a far larger amount almost four times greater than the first phase, now of $224 million and will possibly continue with double the previous time, now estimated for four years until 2025. Like the earlier first work phase in the west wing, this will focus on updating utilities infrastructure of fire protection systems, mechanical, electrical and heating / cooling (HVAC) climate systems and making additional areas as A.D.A. Act recommended handicapped accessible. The scheduled work will also remove now undesirable asbestos substances first installed decades before, and add an additional underground parking garage (to remove outside campus unsightly car parking lots returning the surrounding landscaped grounds to people, and along with a citizens visitor screening area to improve Capitol security in light of recent news events of prior decades. During the 1960s and 1970s, mezzanine levels were constructed between some floors in part of the north wing offices to increase floor space for legislators and their staff, but unfortunately cramping and increasing crowded working conditions. Current project work will remove these as was also earlier done a decade before in the west wing and to clean / restore the original walls of their decorative interior paint scheme colors.

== Former Illinois Capitols ==
=== Kaskaskia State House ===
The current Capitol of Illinois in Springfield is the sixth such building in the history of the state of Illinois. The first was located in Kaskaskia, Illinois, a city on the east bank of the Mississippi River founded by French explorers of the Kingdom of France in 1709, as a southwestern extension of their colony of New France in the interior of the North America continent. Kaskaskia had been an administrative center and on the main inland transportation route for much of the 18th century between the Great Lakes and south to the French and then Spanish colonial port city of New Orleans at the mouth of the Mississippi near the Gulf of Mexico. It became the largest town in the western Illinois Country, ceded by the Kingdom of Great Britain in 1783 after the American Revolutionary War to the newly independent United States. Three decades later, as territorial capital of the old Illinois Territory since its establishment in 1809 by the United States Congress, Kaskaskia was deemed an appropriate state capital location in 1819. The capitol building, a two-story building, was leased for the sum of $4.00 per day.

Wishing to site the capital in the state's interior from its border on the Mississippi, the first General Assembly of Illinois petitioned the U.S. Congress in Washington for a grant of suitable federal public land. Congress offered, and the state accepted, a land parcel further northeast up the Kaskaskia River from the Mississippi, about eighty miles northeast of Kaskaskia. This location, which would be named Vandalia, Illinois, was selected partly with the hopes of encouraging Americans and immigrant settlers to locate in expanding interior areas of the state, moving from the older original Thirteen States on the Atlantic Ocean and East Coast states and cities, and nearby attracting populations from new western states of the old original Northwest Territory of 1783–1803, like Ohio, and states of the Union further south of Kentucky and Tennessee. Illinoisans encouraged people from nearby further east and north in the also newly-formed Michigan Territory, Wisconsin Territory, and the adjacent Indiana Territory to come further west to the fertile new lands in the Mid-Western Plains and prairie of the watersheds of the Mississippi and Ohio River Valleys. The new state of Illinois allowed its lease on the first capital in the river port town of Kaskaskia to expire and relocated its government and courts upstream northeast to Vandalia.

=== Vandalia State Houses ===
- Located in Vandalia, 38.961199°N 89.093980°W

Vandalia was the location of the second, third, and fourth State House Capitol buildings, where the state legislature of the General Assembly of Illinois met for 17 years, between 1820 and 1837. In 1820 with the completion of the new, or "second", capitol, Vandalia became the capital city of the state. The structure burned soon thereafter and a third Capitol quickly rose four years later in 1824 at a cost of $15,000 (equivalent to $439,773 in 2025). After its construction, many state citizens began to advocate relocating the capital to a geographic location nearer to the center of the state. A bill was introduced after only a decade in Vandalia in the General Assembly in 1833, calling for a statewide referendum vote to determine a new location site from a list of several choices including the towns of Alton, Jacksonville, Peoria, Springfield, Vandalia, and the state's actual geographic center. While Alton was voted the victor in the plebiscite, the state legislature determined the margin of numbers was too small to be conclusive, and ignored the vote. In 1836, a young lawyer named Abraham Lincoln (1809–1865), along with colleagues of his in the legal profession, advocated moving the capital to Springfield. That summer with the legislature out of session, the old third Capitol of 1824 in Vandalia was demolished after only 12 years service by local citizens and immediately replaced with the fourth Illinois State House (now preserved as an historic site) in Vandalia—built by local residents at a cost of $16,000 (equivalent to $469,091 in 2025)—in an effort to keep the capital located in Vandalia. Although the new brick structure was well-built and extravagant, the General Assembly of Illinois ignored the town's gesture and voted again in the next session to relocate the state capital to Springfield on February 25, 1837, and build a new state Capitol there.

=== Old State Capitol – Springfield ===
- Located in Springfield, 39.801219°N 89.648569°W

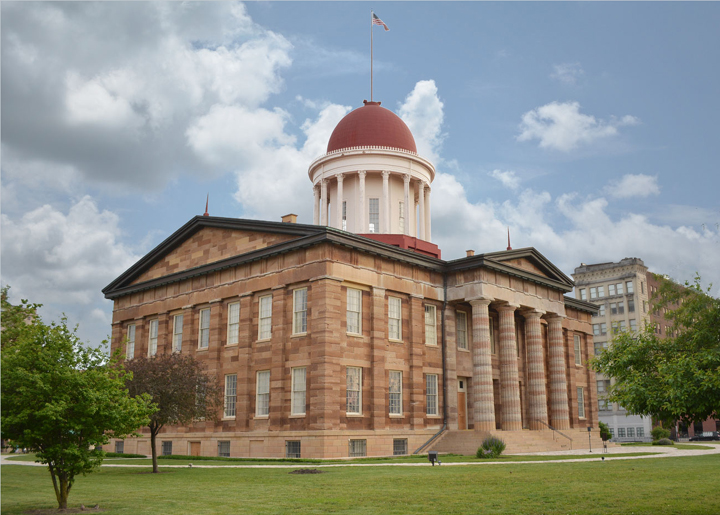
The fifth capitol building is now an historic site and closely associated with Abraham Lincoln

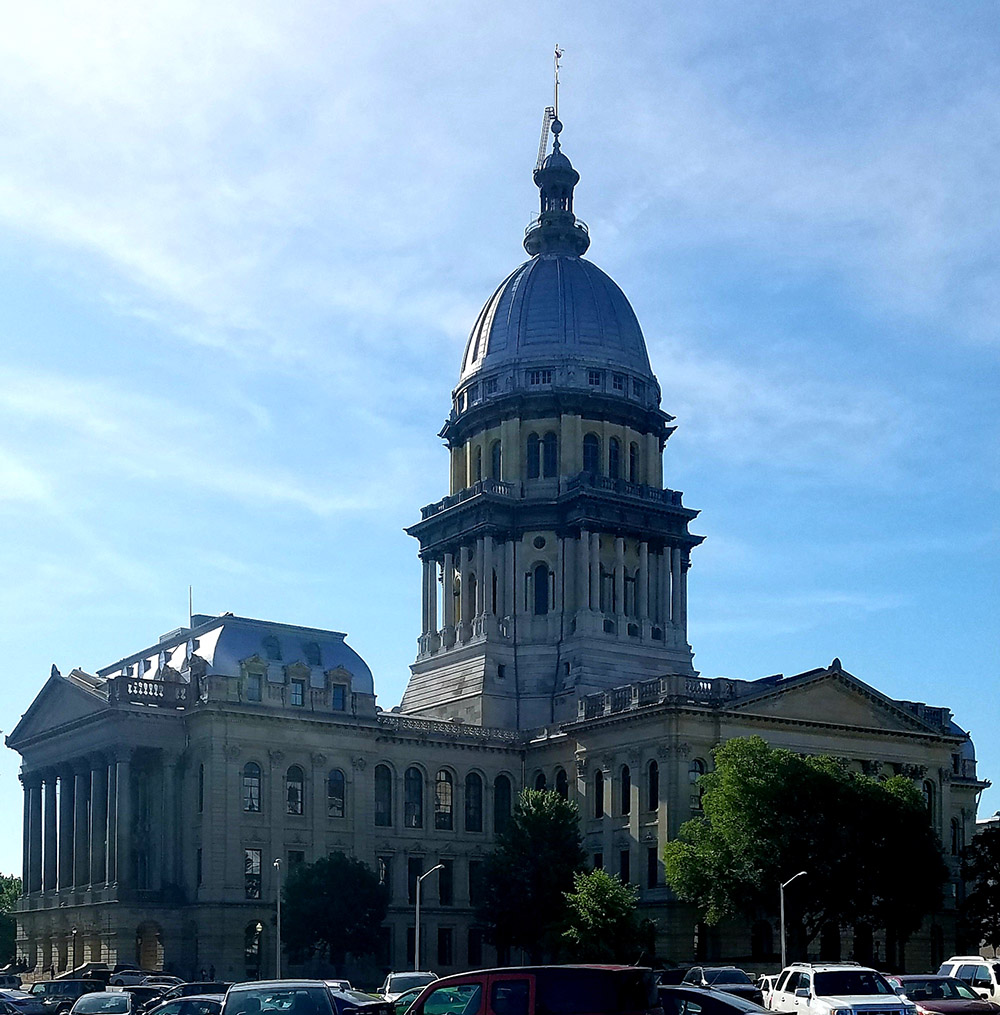
The sixth and current Illinois State Capitol, built 1868–1888, in Springfield, looking northwest at its East Front

On July 4, 1837, the first brick was laid for Illinois's fifth capitol designed by John F. Rague (1799–1877), who also designed the nearly identical Iowa Old Territorial Capitol. After 16 years of work, in 1853, the fifth Illinois Capitol was completed and the first in Springfield for a total sum of $260,000 (equivalent to $10,062,000 in 2025), almost twenty times the cost of any such previous structure. The building was designed in then popular Greek Revival architectural style from stone quarried 6 miles away from the site in Springfield. For many years, it was considered the largest and most extravagant capitol among the western frontier states in the United States and a source of pride.

The fifth capitol is closely associated with 16th President Abraham Lincoln (1809–1865, served 1861–1865); It was here that he argued cases before the local magistrates as a circuit rider elevating to the courthouse of the Illinois Supreme Court, served in the Illinois General Assembly (state legislature), first debated Senator Stephen Douglas, for elections in 1858 to be chosen United States Senator from Illinois to Washington, delivered his famous "House Divided" speech in June 1858, his farewell remarks in February 1861, at the local railroad station before leaving on his cross-country train journey to the White House, and returned four years later in a black-draped funeral mourning car to lay in state in death after his assassination at Ford's Theatre on April 14, 1865, later to be interred in the Lincoln Tomb.

As Illinois prospered and experienced several booms in population, economic and industrial growth, the fifth Capitol became crowded, especially as a result of relocations after the American Civil War (1861–1865). Two years later, on February 24, 1867, the state General Assembly voted to construct a new larger Capitol. After breaking the ground for the sixth and current Illinois State Capitol in 1868, beginning an expensive two decades-long construction project extending to 1888. The state recouped the costs of the earlier fifth Capitol by selling it to the local Sangamon County government for $200,000 (equivalent to $4,837,500 in 2025). It served as the old Sangamon County Courthouse for an additional 73 years until 1961 when the state re-purchased the now historical treasure building back and repaired / renovated and especially restored it to be close to its mid-19th century appearance as a historic landmark of Illinois and American history, designated as the Old State Capitol State Historic Site.

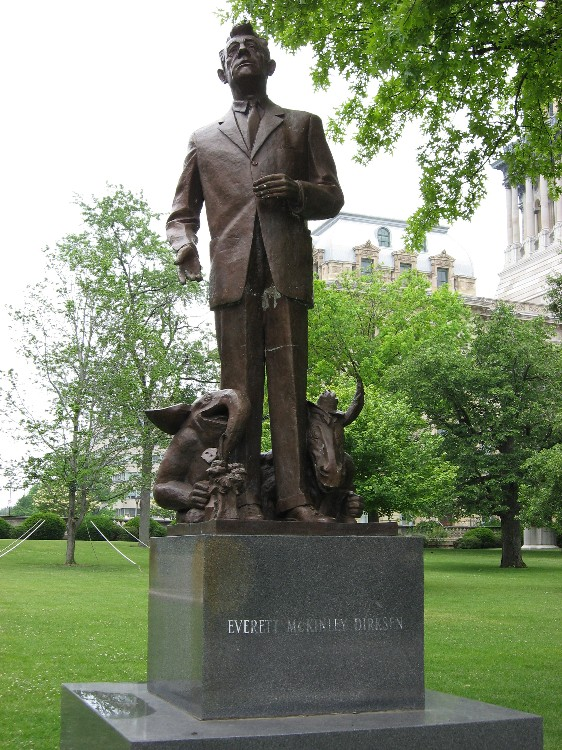
The Illinois Capitol grounds in Springfield holds many historical statues and plaques, such as this bronze of longtime U.S. Senator from Illinois and Republican Party majority leader Everett McKinley Dirksen (1896–1969), served as Senator 1951–1969, as U.S. Representative [congressman] 1933–1949

== See also ==
- National Register of Historic Places listings in Sangamon County, Illinois
- List of Illinois state legislatures
- List of state and territorial capitols in the United States
- List of tallest domes

== Notes ==
Preceded by United States Capitol	Tallest building in the United States outside of New York City; 1888–1895; 110m	Succeeded by Milwaukee City Hall
