= Daley family =

American political family from Chicago

Daley
- Political family
- Country: United States
- Current region: Illinois
- Origin: Chicago, Illinois
- Founder: Richard J. Daley
- Titles: List: Mayor of Chicago (48&54); First Lady of Chicago; Cook County State's Attorney; United States Secretary of Commerce; White House Chief of Staff; 11th Ward Democratic Committeeman; Cook County Commissioner; Illinois State Senator; Illinois State Representative; Metropolitan Water Reclamation District of Greater Chicago Commissioner; Chicago Alderman
- Members: see below

The Daley family is an American political family from Chicago. The family rose to prominence with its patriarch, Richard J. Daley, "the last of the big city bosses." Richard J. Daley and his son, Richard M. Daley, both held the office of the Mayor of Chicago.

== Notable members ==
- Richard J. Daley (1902–1976)
  - Mayor of Chicago, 1955–1976
- Eleanor "Sis" Daley (1907–2003)
  - Wife of Richard J. Daley
- John M. Daley (1923–2015)
- Richard M. Daley (born 1942)
  - Cook County State's Attorney, 1980–1989
  - Mayor of Chicago, 1989–2011
- John P. Daley (born 1946)
  - 11th Ward Democratic Committeeman
  - Cook County Commissioner, 1992–, (Finance Chairman)
  - Illinois State Senator, 1989–1992
  - Illinois State Representative, 1985–1989
- William M. Daley (born 1948)
  - U.S. Secretary of Commerce, 1997–2000
  - White House Chief of Staff, 2011–2012
- Patrick Daley Thompson (son of Richard J. Daley's daughter Patricia; born 1969)
  - Metropolitan Water Reclamation District of Greater Chicago Commissioner 2014–2015
  - Chicago alderman, 11th ward 2015–2022
- Patrick R. Daley (born 1975)

== See also ==
- Kennedy family
- List of U.S. political families
