= Eleanor Daley =

Eleanor Daley may refer to:

- Eleanor Daley (1907–2003), wife of former mayor of Chicago Richard J. Daley and mother of former mayor Richard M. Daley
- Eleanor Daley (composer) (born 1955) Canadian composer, music arranger, organist and accompanist
- Eleanor Daly (Fair City character), fictional character in the Irish television soap opera Fair City
