= Electoral history of Richard M. Daley =

List of elections featuring Richard M. Daley as a candidate

The following is the electoral history of Richard M. Daley, an American politician who served as mayor of Chicago, Cook County State's Attorney, and Illinois state senator.

Daley was the longest-serving mayor of Chicago, serving 22 years with five full terms, plus a partial term.

Daley began his electoral political career being elected to serve as a delegate to the 1969–1970 Illinois constitutional convention.

== Member of the 1969–70 Illinois Constitutional Convention ==
1969 Member of the Illinois Constitutional Convention 23rd district primary
Party	Candidate	Votes	%
Nonpartisan	Richard M. Daley	24,436	43.11
Nonpartisan	Leonard F. Misk	20,714	36.54
Nonpartisan	John P. Tully	4,027	7.10
Nonpartisan	Robert A. Urbanek	3,311	5.84
Nonpartisan	George E. Esch	2,001	3.53
Nonpartisan	Howard J. Doyle	1,305	2.30
Nonpartisan	Stephen J. Winbush	821	1.45
Write-in	Others	70	0.12
Total votes		56,685	100

1969 Member of the Illinois Constitutional Convention 23rd district general election
Party	Candidate	Votes	%
Nonpartisan	Richard M. Daley	30,265	44.90
Nonpartisan	Leonard F. Misk	27,410	40.66
Nonpartisan	John P. Tully	5,275	7.83
Nonpartisan	Robert A. Urbanek	4,459	6.62
Write-in	Others	1	0.00
Total votes		67,410	100

== Illinois state senator ==
=== 1972 ===
1972 Illinois State Senate 23rd district Democratic primary
Party	Candidate	Votes	%
Democratic	Richard M. Daley	41,349	100
Total votes		41,349	100

1972 Illinois State Senate 23rd district election
Party	Candidate	Votes	%
Democratic	Richard M. Daley	53,315	74.12
Republican	Robert A. Urbanek	18,615	25.88
Total votes		71,930	100

=== 1976 ===
1976 Illinois State Senate 23rd district Democratic primary
Party	Candidate	Votes	%
Democratic	Richard M. Daley (incumbent)	36,291	100
Total votes		36,291	100

1976 Illinois State Senate 23rd district election
Party	Candidate	Votes	%
Democratic	Richard M. Daley (incumbent)	53,615	100
Total votes		53,615	100

=== 1978 ===
1978 Illinois State Senate 23rd district Democratic primary
Party	Candidate	Votes	%
Democratic	Richard M. Daley (incumbent)	30,541	100
Total votes		30,541	100

1978 Illinois State Senate 23rd district election
Party	Candidate	Votes	%
Democratic	Richard M. Daley (incumbent)	46,652	100
Total votes		46,652	100

== Cook County State's Attorney ==
=== 1980 ===
1980 Cook County State’s Attorney Democratic primary
Party	Candidate	Votes	%
Democratic	Richard M. Daley (incumbent)	436,089	62.63
Democratic	Edward M. Burke	260,266	37.38
Total votes		696,355	100

1980 Cook County State's Attorney election
Party	Candidate	Votes	%
Democratic	Richard M. Daley	1,058,529	50.39
Republican	Bernard Carey (incumbent)	1,042,287	49.61
Total votes		2,100,816	100

=== 1984 ===
1984 Cook County State's Attorney Democratic primary
Party	Candidate	Votes	%
Democratic	Richard M. Daley (incumbent)	629,743	63.85
Democratic	Lawrence S. Bloom	356,381	36.14
Total votes		986,124	100

1984 Cook County State's Attorney election
Party	Candidate	Votes	%
Democratic	Richard M. Daley (incumbent)	1,418,775	65.98
Republican	Richard J. Brzeczek	731,634	34.02
Total votes		2,100,816	100

=== 1988 ===
1988 Cook County State's Attorney Democratic primary
Party	Candidate	Votes	%
Democratic	Richard M. Daley (incumbent)	641,789	100
Total votes		641,789	100

1988 Cook County State's Attorney election
Party	Candidate	Votes	%
Democratic	Richard M. Daley (incumbent)	1,303,906	66.70
Republican	Terrance Gainer	650,942	33.30
Total votes		1,954,848	100

== Mayor of Chicago ==
=== 1983 ===
1983 Chicago mayoral Democratic primary
Party	Candidate	Votes	%
Democratic	Harold Washington	424,324	36.28
Democratic	Jane Byrne (incumbent)	393,500	33.64
Democratic	Richard M. Daley	346,835	29.65
Democratic	Frank R. Ranallo	2,367	0.20
Democratic	William Markowski	1,412	0.12
Democratic	Sheila Jones	1,285	0.08
Total votes		1,169,723	100

=== 1989 special ===
1989 Chicago mayoral special election Democratic primary
Party	Candidate	Votes	%
Democratic	Richard M. Daley	485,182	55.63
Democratic	Eugene Sawyer (incumbent)	383,535	43.98
Democratic	James C. Taylor	2,233	0.26
Democratic	Sheila A. Jones	1,160	0.13
Total votes		872,110	100.00

1989 Chicago mayoral special election
Party	Candidate	Votes	%
Democratic	Richard M. Daley	576,620	55.42
Harold Washington	Timothy C. Evans	427,954	41.13
Republican	Edward Vrdolyak	35,964	3.46
Total votes		1,040,538	100

=== 1991 ===
1991 Chicago mayoral Democratic primary
Party	Candidate	Votes	%
Democratic	Richard M. Daley (incumbent)	408,418	69.47
Democratic	Danny K. Davis	199,408	33.92
Democratic	Jane M. Byrne	38,216	6.50
Democratic	Sheila A. Jones	2,146	0.37
Total votes		587,923	100

1991 Chicago mayoral election
Party	Candidate	Votes	%
Democratic	Richard M. Daley (incumbent)	450,581	70.64
Harold Washington	R. Eugene Pincham	160,302	25.13
Republican	George S. Gottlieb	23,421	3.67
Socialist Workers	James Warren	3,581	0.56
Total votes		637,885	100

=== 1995 ===
1995 Chicago mayoral Democratic primary
Party	Candidate	Votes	%
Democratic	Richard M. Daley (incumbent)	348,153	65.79
Democratic	Joseph E. Gardner	174,943	33.06
Democratic	Sheila A. Jones	6,067	1.15
Total votes		529,163	100

1995 Chicago mayoral election
Party	Candidate	Votes	%
Democratic	Richard M. Daley (incumbent)	359,466	60.09
Independent	Roland W. Burris	217,024	36.28
Republican	Raymond Wardingley	16,568	2.77
Harold Washington	Lawrence C. Redmond	5,160	0.86
Total votes		598,218	100

=== 1999 ===
1999 Chicago mayoral election
Party	Candidate	Votes	%
Nonpartisan	Richard M. Daley (incumbent)	428,872	71.89
Nonpartisan	Bobby Rush	167,709	28.11
Total votes		596,581	100

=== 2003 ===
2003 Chicago mayoral election
Party	Candidate	Votes	%
Nonpartisan	Richard M. Daley (incumbent)	363,553	78.46
Nonpartisan	Paul L. Jakes Jr.	64,941	14.02
Nonpartisan	Patricia McAllister	27,350	5.90
Nonpartisan	Joseph McAfee	7,488	1.62
Write-in	Others	3	0.00
Total votes		463,335	100

=== 2007 ===
2007 Chicago mayoral election
Party	Candidate	Votes	%
Nonpartisan	Richard M. Daley (incumbent)	324,519	71.05
Nonpartisan	Dorothy A. Brown	91,878	20.12
Nonpartisan	William Walls	40,368	8.84
Write-in	Others	22	0.00
Total votes		456,787	100
