= 2003 Chicago mayoral election =

- February 25, 2003
- Turnout: 32.26% ▼9.64 pp
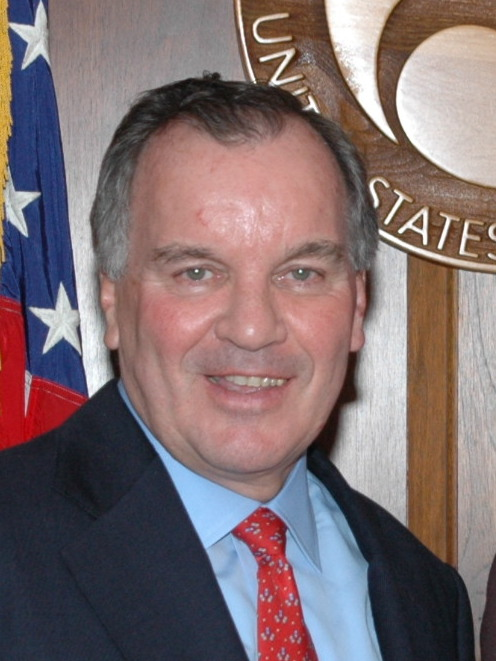

Candidate	Richard M. Daley	Paul Jakes Jr.	Patricia McAllister
Popular vote	363,553	64,941	27,350
Percentage	78.46%	14.02%	5.90%
- Ward results Daley: 50–60% 60–70% 70–80% 80–90% >90%
Mayor before election
Richard M. Daley
Elected Mayor
Richard M. Daley

The Chicago mayoral election of 2003 saw incumbent Mayor Richard M. Daley easily reelected against small and divided opposition, resulting in his best electoral showing of his career, winning by a landslide 64 point margin.

== Candidates ==
Incumbent mayor Richard M. Daley ran without significant challengers on the ballot. His challengers could have potentially been denied ballot access had Daley challenged them for collecting an insufficient number of valid signatures in their petitions (mayoral candidates were required by law to collect 25,000 in order to garner ballot access, and only Jakes came near that amount). In such an instance, Daley would have been unopposed on the ballot. However Daley did not challenge his opponents' ballot access.

=== On ballot ===
- Richard M. Daley, incumbent mayor
- Paul Jakes Jr., minister
- Joseph McAfee, minister
- Patricia McAllister, businesswoman

=== Withdrew after qualifying for ballot ===
- Robert Floid Plump, minister and musician

=== Withdrew without submitting ballot petition ===
- James Meeks, state senator

== Campaign ==
On December 9, 2002, a spokesperson for Daley confirmed that Daley would be announcing his candidacy for re-election. Daley's candidacy was widely anticipated. A popular incumbent, Daley had won strong victories in the preceding four consecutive mayoral elections. He was anticipated to become the city's second-longest tenured mayor (after only his own father, Richard J. Daley –who served more than 22 years) when he surpassed Edward Joseph Kelly at the end of the term he was already elected to.

All three of Daley's opponents were African Americans. Both Jakes, and McAfee were clergy. McAllister was a businesswoman. A fourth African-American candidate, Robert Floid Plump (who the Chicago Tribune reported to be a "self-described South Side minister and musician"), withdrew in mid-January citing concern about splitting the African-American vote. Also briefly challenging Daley, but withdrawing from the race before ballot petitions were to be submitted, had been James Meeks (also African-American).

All of Daley's opponents on the ballot had little electoral experience. They struggled in fundraising (each only raising several thousand dollars) and failed to receive backing from black leaders. They also lacked name recognition. Their prospects of unseating Daley were seen as dim. While the election was nonpartisan, all candidates running were Democrats.

As was the case in all of his reelection campaigns, Daley did not attend any debates.The last debate he had engaged in was during the 1989 Democratic mayoral primary.

In the final weeks before the election, Daley's mother (former first lady of Chicago Eleanor "Sis" Daley) died, and the city saw fatal tragedy with the E2 nightclub stampede. After his mother's death, Daley ceased making campaign appearances, though he continued airing television advertisements.

== Results ==
The election saw what was, up to that point, the lowest turnout in Chicago mayoral election history. Daley won a majority of the vote in each of the city's 50 wards.

Daley received his highest-ever vote share, surpassing the 71.91% he had received in the previous election. His 78.46% was the third-highest vote share in Chicago mayoral history, behind only Jane Byrne's 1979 share of 82.05% and James H. Woodworth's 1849 share of 80.02%. He surpassed his own father's best result of 77.67% in 1975.

By winning his fifth mayoral election, Daley tied Carter Harrison III and Carter Harrison IV for the second-most mayoral election victories in Chicago history. Daley would subsequently win an additional mayoral election in 2007, thereby surpassing both Harrisons and tying his own father's record for the most mayoral election victories.

Mayor of Chicago 2003 (General Election)
Party	Candidate	Votes	%
Nonpartisan	Richard M. Daley (incumbent)	363,553	78.46
Nonpartisan	Paul L. Jakes Jr.	64,941	14.02
Nonpartisan	Patricia McAllister	27,350	5.90
Nonpartisan	Joseph McAfee	7,488	1.62
Write-in	Johnnie H. Barnes	2	0.00
Write-in	Joel W. Britton	1	0.00
Turnout		463,335	

=== Results by ward ===
Ward	Daley		Jakes		McAfee		McAllister		Total	Turnout %
Ward	Votes	%	Votes	%	Votes	%	Votes	%	Total	Turnout %
1	5,892	84.49%	501	7.18%	119	1.71%	462	6.62%	6,974	26.93%
2	5,632	70.05%	1,745	21.70%	125	1.55%	538	6.69%	8,040	28.78%
3	4,930	61.97%	2,163	27.19%	183	2.30%	680	8.55%	7,956	32.67%
4	6,153	62.21%	2,688	27.18%	194	1.96%	856	8.65%	9,891	35.54%
5	5,693	62.54%	2,445	26.86%	198	2.18%	767	8.43%	9,103	31.79%
6	7,457	58.08%	4,008	31.21%	294	2.29%	1,081	8.42%	12,840	34.70%
7	5,610	61.39%	2,547	27.87%	234	2.56%	748	8.18%	9,139	28.26%
8	8,484	61.34%	3,816	27.59%	390	2.82%	1,142	8.26%	13,832	35.80%
9	6,012	61.13%	2,781	28.28%	221	2.25%	820	8.34%	9,834	27.94%
10	6,867	89.86%	412	5.39%	92	1.20%	271	3.55%	7,642	28.43%
11	12,129	95.90%	207	1.64%	79	0.62%	233	1.84%	12,648	57.78%
12	4,405	92.85%	123	2.59%	49	1.03%	167	3.52%	4,744	39.60%
13	12,168	94.26%	291	2.25%	105	0.81%	345	2.67%	12,909	54.22%
14	5,455	95.22%	101	1.76%	37	0.65%	136	2.37%	5,729	44.55%
15	4,125	66.23%	1,492	23.96%	101	1.62%	510	8.19%	6,228	23.81%
16	3,868	66.10%	1,371	23.43%	130	2.22%	483	8.25%	5,852	24.64%
17	5,847	62.39%	2,573	27.45%	192	2.05%	760	8.11%	9,372	28.14%
18	10,018	72.75%	2,717	19.73%	179	1.30%	857	6.22%	13,771	39.95%
19	16,882	83.86%	1,704	8.46%	383	1.90%	1,161	5.77%	20,130	56.35%
20	4,290	62.23%	1,855	26.91%	180	2.61%	569	8.25%	6,894	28.90%
21	8,391	59.35%	4,371	30.92%	270	1.91%	1,105	7.82%	14,137	33.56%
22	3,043	84.69%	281	7.82%	47	1.31%	222	6.18%	3,593	24.24%
23	13,925	91.52%	526	3.46%	190	1.25%	575	3.78%	15,216	51.65%
24	5,151	59.04%	2,695	30.89%	173	1.98%	705	8.08%	8,724	26.97%
25	6,353	86.51%	472	6.43%	110	1.50%	409	5.57%	7,344	39.12%
26	4,959	83.51%	499	8.40%	100	1.68%	380	6.40%	5,938	27.03%
27	5,307	71.06%	1,548	20.73%	118	1.58%	495	6.63%	7,468	26.03%
28	4,380	60.57%	2,156	29.82%	131	1.81%	564	7.80%	7,231	23.21%
29	7,735	71.67%	2,286	21.18%	119	1.10%	652	6.04%	10,792	37.73%
30	5,450	90.94%	231	3.85%	65	1.08%	247	4.12%	5,993	31.59%
31	4,885	91.84%	166	3.12%	57	1.07%	211	3.97%	5,319	27.18%
32	6,709	88.68%	399	5.27%	105	1.39%	352	4.65%	7,565	23.25%
33	6,218	91.47%	253	3.72%	68	1.00%	259	3.81%	6,798	41.07%
34	7,472	61.44%	3,498	28.76%	267	2.20%	924	7.60%	12,161	30.51%
35	6,723	83.01%	647	7.99%	149	1.84%	580	7.16%	8,099	36.45%
36	9,860	91.02%	439	4.05%	135	1.25%	399	3.68%	10,833	37.39%
37	4,841	63.81%	2,045	26.96%	121	1.60%	579	7.63%	7,586	25.42%
38	8,656	91.56%	321	3.40%	132	1.40%	345	3.65%	9,454	35.07%
39	7,229	91.83%	268	3.40%	91	1.16%	284	3.61%	7,872	33.59%
40	5,831	89.28%	338	5.18%	64	0.98%	298	4.56%	6,531	30.82%
41	12,766	87.55%	688	4.72%	293	2.01%	835	5.73%	14,582	40.50%
42	9,281	90.01%	499	4.84%	119	1.15%	412	4.00%	10,311	30.60%
43	6,062	89.85%	363	5.38%	84	1.24%	238	3.53%	6,747	19.97%
44	8,939	89.26%	457	4.56%	136	1.36%	483	4.82%	10,015	30.47%
45	12,026	90.35%	474	3.56%	207	1.56%	604	4.54%	13,311	44.54%
46	8,804	83.57%	938	8.90%	167	1.59%	626	5.94%	10,535	38.26%
47	10,706	86.46%	757	6.11%	173	1.40%	746	6.02%	12,382	40.22%
48	7,434	85.76%	697	8.04%	103	1.19%	434	5.01%	8,668	32.81%
49	5,275	78.40%	797	11.85%	126	1.87%	530	7.88%	6,728	33.72%
50	7,061	91.89%	280	3.64%	79	1.03%	264	3.44%	7,684	35.41%
