= William M. Daley =

American lawyer and politician (born 1948)

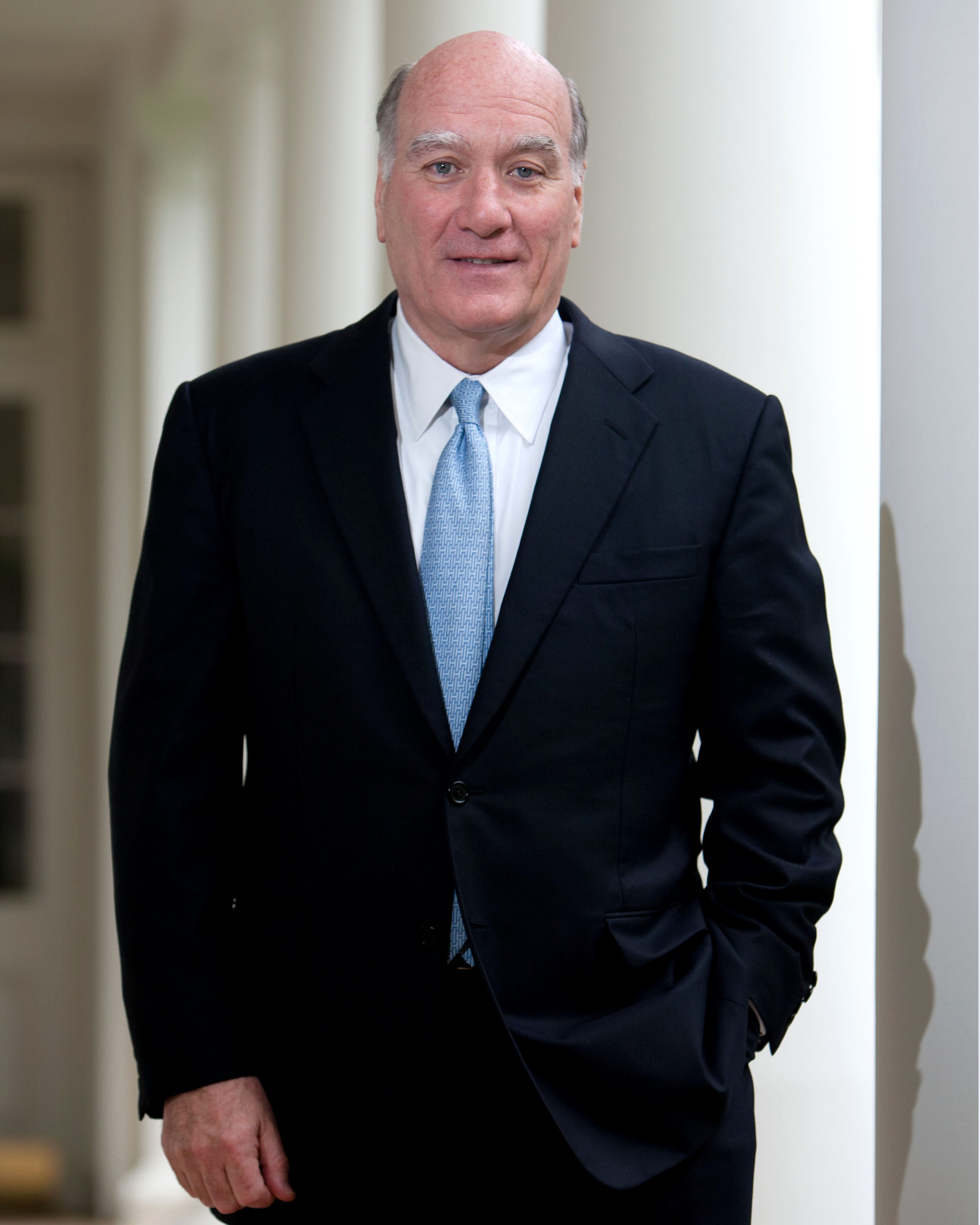
- Official portrait, 2011

24th White House Chief of Staff
- In office January 13, 2011 – January 27, 2012
- President: Barack Obama
- Preceded by: Pete Rouse (acting)
- Succeeded by: Jack Lew

32nd United States Secretary of Commerce
- In office January 30, 1997 – July 19, 2000
- President: Bill Clinton
- Preceded by: Mickey Kantor
- Succeeded by: Norman Mineta

Personal details
- Born: William Michael Daley; August 9, 1948 (age 78) Chicago, Illinois, U.S.
- Party: Democratic
- Spouse: Bernadette Keller
- Children: 4
- Parents: Richard J. Daley (father); Eleanor Guilfoyle (mother)
- Relatives: John P. Daley (brother); Richard M. Daley (brother); Patrick Daley Thompson (nephew); Patrick R. Daley (nephew)
- Education: Loyola University Chicago (BA); University of Illinois Chicago (JD)

William Michael Daley (born August 9, 1948) is an American lawyer and banker. He served as the 32nd United States secretary of commerce in the administration of Bill Clinton from 1997 to 2000, and as the 24th White House chief of staff in the administration of Barack Obama from 2011 to 2012.

== Early life and education ==
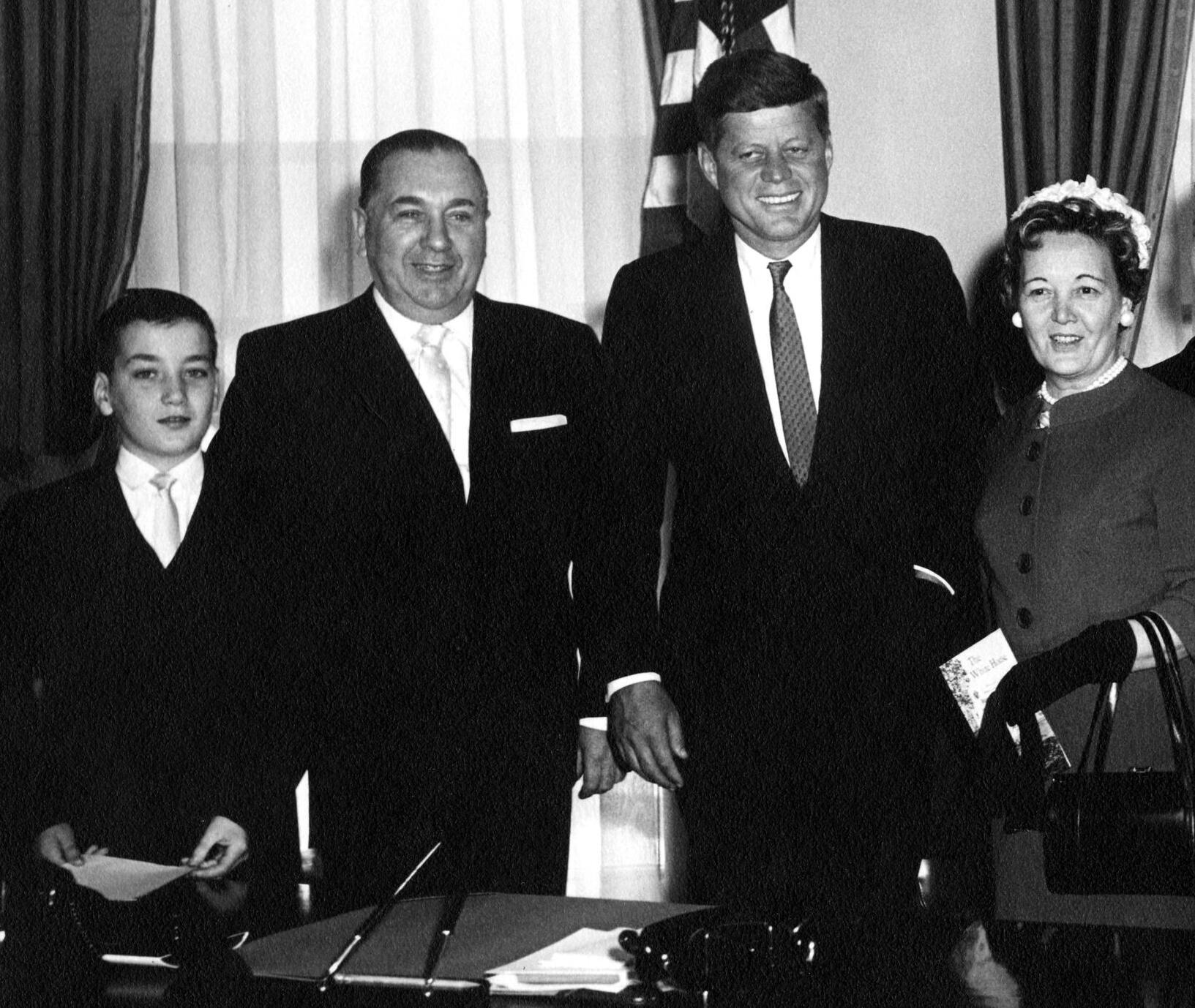
Daley with his parents and President John F. Kennedy in the Oval Office in 1961

Daley was born in Chicago on August 9, 1948. He is the youngest of seven children of Richard J. Daley and Eleanor "Sis" Daley (née Guilfoyle). His father served as the Mayor of Chicago from 1955 to 1976. He is the brother of former Illinois legislator John P. Daley and former Chicago mayor Richard M. Daley.

He was raised in the neighborhood of Bridgeport on Chicago's South Side. He graduated from St. Ignatius College Prep in 1966 and obtained a bachelor's degree from Loyola University Chicago in 1970.

Daley received a Juris Doctor degree from the John Marshall Law School (now the University of Illinois Chicago School of Law) and practiced at the law firm Daley and George. Between 1977 and 1980, he stepped down from the firm to serve on the Advisory Council of Economic Opportunity.

Daley managed his brother Richard M. Daley's campaign in the 1980 Cook County State's Attorney election, which Richard won and served as state attorney from 1981 to 1989. This was the first election in which a family member of former mayor Richard J. Daley ran for Chicago or Cook County politics. Daley continued to assist in his brother Richard's political campaigns, notably during his campaigns for mayor of Chicago, which his brother lost in 1983 but won in 1989.

== Business career ==
Daley is a former banker and served on the executive committee of JPMorgan Chase & Co. Daley served the Amalgamated Bank of Chicago as the first vice chairman from 1989 to 1990, and was the bank's president and chief operating officer from 1990 to 1993. Afterwards, Daley began practicing law again, working as a partner with the firm Mayer, Brown & Platt from 1993 to 1997.

Daley was appointed to the board of Fannie Mae in 1993 by President Bill Clinton, serving until 1997.

In December 2001, Daley was appointed to a newly created position as President of SBC Communications. In May 2004, he was appointed Midwest Chairman of JPMorgan Chase, following its acquisition of Bank One Corporation. He was appointed as head of the Corporate Responsibility program in 2007 and served in this role until 2010.

Daley has worked for several corporations and non-profit institutions, including Boeing, Merck & Co., and Boston Properties. In 2010, he received the Chicago History Museum's "Making History Award" for Distinction in Civic Leadership. In 2014, he joined Argentière Capital AG as a managing partner. Daley worked as Vice Chairman of BNY Mellon from June through October 2019.

On November 7, 2019, it was announced that Daley had been appointed to serve as head of Public Affairs and would also serve as one of the vice chairmen at Wells Fargo. Daley's appointment went into effect on November 13, 2019, where he held this position until 2023. He has also held governance roles in higher education institutions. He is currently a trustee of Northwestern University and is a member of the Council on Foreign Relations.

== Clinton administration ==
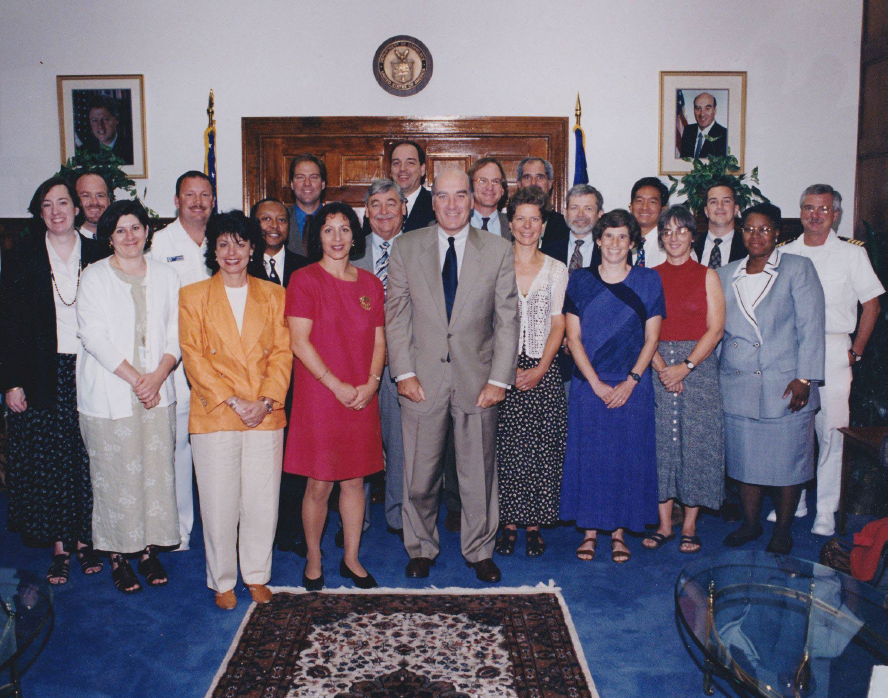
As U.S. Secretary of Commerce, Daley (center) poses with the leadership of the National Marine Sanctuaries program in the late 1990s

In 1993, Daley was appointed special counsel to President Bill Clinton. In this role, he took part in advocating for and securing the passage of the North American Free Trade Agreement (NAFTA). He coordinated efforts between the White House, members of Congress, and private industry to build bipartisan support for the agreement. His work on NAFTA involved policy development and negotiations with multiple stakeholders.

Daley was appointed United States secretary of commerce by Clinton at the start of his second term, and served in the role from 1997 to 2000. At his confirmation hearing, Daley stated that he intended to "restore the Commerce Department's reputation" and ensure that its programs met appropriate standards of integrity. As Secretary of Commerce, Daley's portfolio included U.S. exports, trade policy, and public-private partnerships, and he promoted free trade policies and efforts to streamline trade infrastructure. He ran the 2000 United States census and eliminated several positions in the department with the intent to streamline operations. He also led several trade missions while expanding the departments' role in e-commerce.

Daley resigned as secretary of commerce to become the general chairman of the Al Gore 2000 presidential campaign, replacing Tony Coelho. He was portrayed in the HBO film Recount, about the Florida election recount of the 2000 presidential election, by actor Mitch Pileggi.

== Obama administration ==
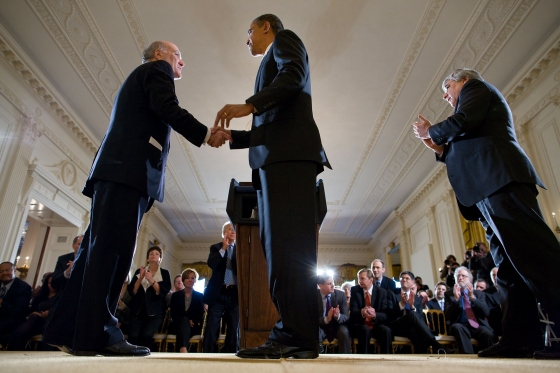
President Obama welcomes Daley (left) as the new Chief of Staff in January 2011

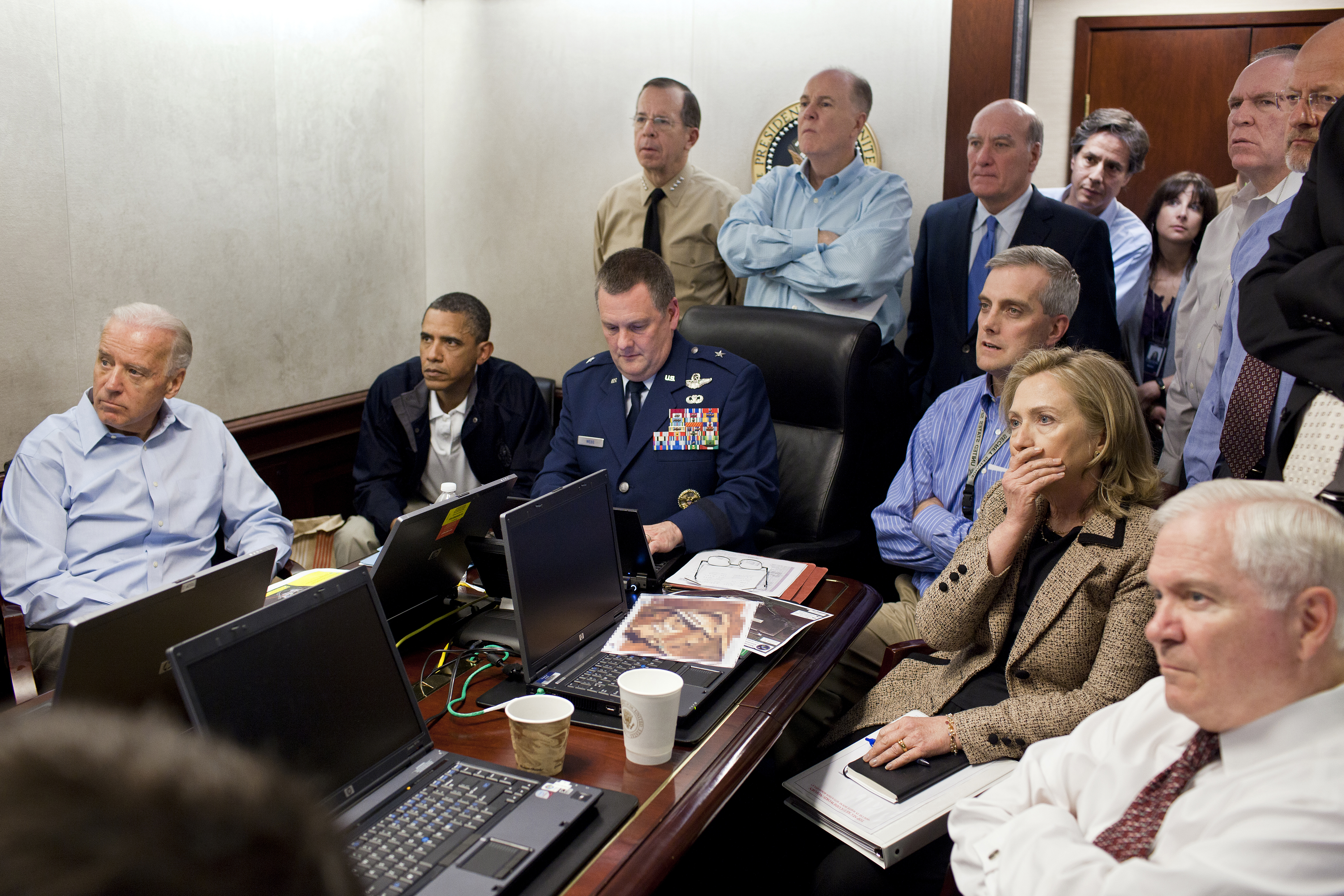
Daley, upper center-right, standing with the U.S. national security team gathered in the Situation Room to monitor the progress of Operation Neptune Spear

During the 2008 Democratic presidential primaries, Daley supported Barack Obama. On November 5, 2008, Daley was named to the advisory board of the Obama-Biden Transition Project.

On January 6, 2011, Obama named Daley as his next White House chief of staff, and he took office on January 13, 2011. Daley succeeded Rahm Emanuel, who served as chief of staff during the first two years of the president's term and left the position in October 2010.

In March 2011, speaking for the Obama administration on Meet the Press, Daley said the administration would consider using the Strategic Petroleum Reserve if rising oil prices caused by the Arab Spring threatened the U.S. economy. He added that the administration was looking at all possible options. He repeated the administration's stance that there was enough output capacity in the world to deal with any disruptions from Libya caused by the uprisings. Daley was photographed in the White House Situation Room photograph, taken on May 1, 2011, by Pete Souza. Later in May 2011, he was part of the Presidential State Visit to the United Kingdom.

In October 2011, Daley stated that he would continue in his role through the 2012 United States presidential election, promising, "I made a commitment to put the president through his re-election, which I'm confident he will do, and then my wife and I will be back in Chicago." On January 9, 2012, it was announced that Daley would resign as Obama's chief of staff. Jack Lew was announced as his successor.

== 2014 Illinois gubernatorial campaign ==
Logo from Daley's gubernatorial campaign effort

Just after the 2012 presidential election, in the November 8, 2012, issue of the Chicago Tribune, Daley was reported as considering a run in the 2014 election for governor of Illinois. Daley said:

"I've thought about it before, and I don't take it off the table. I think right now, to be very frank with you, the last thing in the world anybody wants to hear about is a race that's two years down the road."

Daley further was quoted as saying:

"I'm not closing the door, and I know that sounds like a politician, but the fact of the matter is that these are tough days, and I think there's a lot to be done by the Legislature. I don't think it helps right now for people to be out there saying they're going to run, and they have a solution at this point. I think we've got to see what the Legislature does."

On June 10, 2013, Daley announced via YouTube that he would launch an exploratory committee to run for governor of Illinois. On July 2, 2013, New York mayor Michael Bloomberg endorsed Daley for governor. Daley filed documents declaring himself an official candidate to challenge incumbent Pat Quinn in the Democratic primary on July 30, 2013, but announced that he was exiting the race due to the personal hardships inherent in running a campaign on September 16, 2013. After the election, he served as co-chair of the transition team for the incoming Rauner Administration.

In the 2018 Illinois gubernatorial election, Daley served as the head of finances for the campaign of gubernatorial candidate Christopher G. Kennedy.

== 2019 Chicago mayoral campaign ==
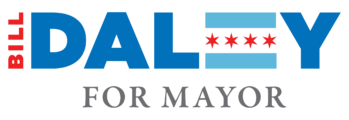
Mayoral campaign logo

After two-term mayor Rahm Emanuel announced he would not seek re-election, it was reported on September 14, 2018, that Daley would run for mayor of Chicago. Among Daley's positions was support for the city's consideration of a potential commuter tax. He also proposed reducing the size of the Chicago City Council from 50 members to 15.

Daley was one of four mayoral candidates (alongside Gery Chico, Susana Mendoza, and Toni Preckwinkle) with ties to Alderman Edward M. Burke, whose corruption scandal regarding misuse of Burke's political role for personal business upended the race for mayor.

Daley's campaign received endorsements from the editorial boards of the Chicago Tribune, Crain's Chicago Business, and The Chicago Crusader. He received the endorsement of Plumbers Local Union 130. He also received endorsements from politicians Al Gore, Emil Jones, Joseph P. Kennedy II, and Bobby Rush. One notable financial contributor to Daley's campaign was Illinois billionaire Kenneth C. Griffin. Griffin's financial support drew criticism; he had previously been a major financial backer of the unsuccessful 2018 re-election campaign of Republican former Illinois governor Bruce Rauner.

Daley placed third in the election, failing to advance to the run-off. He won 82,294 votes, 14.78% of the overall votes cast in the first round.

== Personal life ==
Daley married Bernadette Keller in 2010. He has four children. As of 2019, his three adult children and three granddaughters live in Chicago. In 2006, Keller purchased a 2,052 square feet (295,500 square inches) apartment in the Park Tower on North Michigan Avenue for $1.48 million. The couple sold the unit in 2015 for $1.4 million. They later moved to a four-bedroom condominium on North Lake Shore Drive.

Keller is a founding member and director of the Chicago Transplant Ethics Consortium.

Daley endorsed Representative Raja Krishnamoorthi for U.S. Senate in January 2026.

Political offices
Preceded by Mickey Kantor	United States Secretary of Commerce; 1997–2000	Succeeded by Norman Mineta
Preceded by Pete Rouse; Acting	White House Chief of Staff; 2011–2012	Succeeded by Jack Lew
U.S. order of precedence (ceremonial)
Preceded by Andrew Cuomo as Former U.S. Cabinet Member	Order of precedence of the United States as Former U.S. Cabinet Member	Succeeded by Rodney E. Slater as Former U.S. Cabinet Member
