= Patrick R. Daley =

American businessman

- Born: Patrick Richard Daley; June 10, 1975 (age 51); Chicago, Illinois, U.S.
- Education: United States Military Academy; University of Illinois, Urbana-Champaign (BA); University of Chicago (MBA)
- Father: Richard M. Daley
- Relatives: Richard J. Daley (grandfather); Eleanor Daley (grandmother); William M. Daley (uncle); John P. Daley (uncle)

Patrick Richard Daley (born June 10, 1975) is an American businessman. He is the son of the former mayor of Chicago, Richard M. Daley. Daley and his father are partners in a Chicago-based investment firm.

== Early life and education ==
Patrick Daley is the son of politician Richard M. Daley and Margaret "Maggie" Corbett Daley. He attended Mount Carmel High School in Chicago. At age 18, Daley enrolled as a cadet in the United States Military Academy at West Point, New York, having been nominated to the academy by U.S. Representative Bill Lipinski. He left West Point during his first year. In 2004, he received an MBA from the University of Chicago. Later that year, the 29-year-old Daley decided to enlist in the Army's regular airborne infantry rather than enter service through officer's training.

== Philanthropy ==
Daley has been actively involved in several civic and philanthropic endeavors. He serves on the board of various non-profit organizations dedicated to education, youth empowerment, and urban renewal. Recognizing the importance of education, he has been a staunch advocate for improving schools and expanding educational opportunities for all residents.

== Personal life ==
In 2019, Daley married Tara Flocco with the ceremony held at Theater on the Lake when Patrick’s late mother, Maggie Daley, was memorialized.

== Controversies ==
=== Brawl at Daley home in Michigan ===
In the first days of March 1992, then 16-year-old Patrick arranged a party without parental consent at their beach house. After an uninvited company of four was asked to leave the premises, an incident spurred by an exchange of different opinions & allegedly involving racial slurs led to a fistfight which culminated with a strike of a baseball bat to the skull of one person who was seriously wounded, as well as the pointing of a shotgun, which Patrick gave to his cousin, towards the aforementioned individuals. The injured youth recovered.

Patrick pleaded guilty to misdemeanor charges of furnishing alcohol to minors and disturbing the peace and was sentenced to six months' probation, 50 hours of community service in Grand Beach, fined $1,950 and ordered to pay restitution to his parents for property damage. His cousin pleaded guilty to aiming a firearm without malice and was fined $1,235. Sixteen other youths were charged with juvenile and adult offenses.

=== Sewer-inspection contract ===
Patrick was an MBA student at the University of Chicago's Business School, working as an unpaid intern at Cardinal Growth, a Chicago venture capital firm. In June 2003, Patrick and his cousin Vanecko formed a Delaware company MSS Investors LLC and invested $65,000 each to acquire a 5% stake in Municipal Sewer Services, a Cardinal Growth venture. Months later, Municipal Sewer Services was awarded a $3 million, no-bid sewer inspection contract extension from the City of Chicago, and, later, two further extensions worth an additional $4 million. Daley's and Venecko's ownership was deliberately omitted from the ethics disclosures required of City contractors.

The day after Patrick Daley's and Robert Vanecko's hidden involvement in a city contract was disclosed in the Chicago Sun-Times, Mayor Daley stated, "I did not know about [Patrick's] involvement in this company." Mayor Daley also said he didn't know if there are other city contracts involving the younger Daley. A Chicago Tribune editorial asked, "Who omitted the names of the clout cousins when Municipal Sewer Services filed its disclosure statements? Who at City Hall tapped the company for no-bid work? Were the cousins involved in any other ventures doing business with the city?"

The city's inspector general and federal authorities began investigations in December 2007. Patrick Daley and Robert Vanecko hired criminal defense attorneys. Municipal Sewer Services LLC folded in April 2008. In January 2011, the president of Municipal Sewer Services, was charged with three counts of mail fraud in conjunction with minority contracting, and later pleaded guilty and was sentenced to 17 months in prison. Jesse Brunt and his company, Brunt Brothers Transfer Inc., was also indicted on three counts of mail fraud. Patrick Daley and Vanecko were not charged with any crime.

=== Airport Wi-Fi deal ===
In 2005, Concourse Communications, another Cardinal Growth venture, signed a potentially lucrative city contract for airport Wi-Fi service at city-owned O'Hare Airport and Midway Airport. Concourse disclosed its investors to the city, as required, and Daley was not listed. On June 27, 2006, nine months after it signed the contract, Concourse was sold, at a 33% profit, to Boingo Wireless Inc. for $45 million. Over the next 17 months, Daley received five payments from Concourse totaling $544,210, for a total of $708,999. "...[T]he conflict of interest was blatant...all the laws in the world can't deter one truly single-minded schemer," the Chicago Sun-Times editorialized. In February, 2010 Daley lived in Moscow between deployments. In June 2011, United States Attorney Patrick Fitzgerald filed suit on behalf of the Small Business Administration to recover $21.4 million of a $51 million small business loan Cardinal Growth had borrowed but was unable to repay, and Cardinal Growth agreed to be liquidated.
