= Richard J. Daley =

Mayor of Chicago from 1955 to 1976

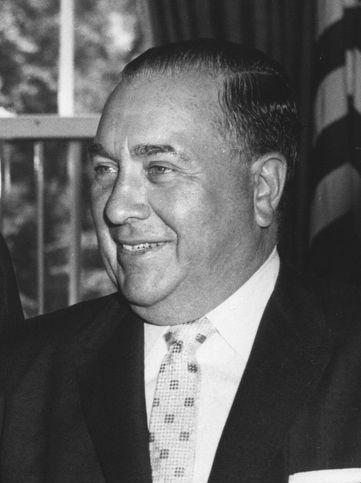
- Daley in 1962

48th Mayor of Chicago
- In office April 20, 1955 – December 20, 1976
- Preceded by: Martin H. Kennelly
- Succeeded by: Michael Bilandic

Chairman of the Cook County Democratic Party
- In office July 21, 1953 – December 20, 1976
- Preceded by: Joseph L. Gill
- Succeeded by: George Dunne

16th President of the United States Conference of Mayors
- In office 1959–1960
- Preceded by: Norris Poulson
- Succeeded by: Richardson Dilworth

19th Cook County Clerk
- In office March 20, 1950 – April 20, 1955
- Preceded by: Michael J. Flynn
- Succeeded by: Edward J. Barrett

Minority Leader of the Illinois Senate
- In office 1943–1947

Member of the Illinois Senate from the 9th district
- In office January 4, 1939 – January 8, 1947
- Preceded by: Patrick J. Carroll
- Succeeded by: Thaddeus Adesko

Member of the Illinois House of Representatives from the 9th district
- In office January 6, 1937 – January 4, 1939
- Preceded by: David Shanahan
- Succeeded by: William Fucane

Personal details
- Born: Richard Joseph Daley; May 15, 1902 Chicago, Illinois, U.S.
- Died: December 20, 1976 (aged 74) Chicago, Illinois, U.S.
- Resting place: Holy Sepulchre Cemetery
- Party: Democratic
- Spouse: Sis Guilfoyle (m. 1936)
- Children: 7, including Richard, John, and William
- Relatives: Patrick R. Daley (grandson); Patrick Daley Thompson (grandson)
- Education: DePaul University (LLB)

Richard Joseph Daley (May 15, 1902 – December 20, 1976) was an American politician who served as the mayor of Chicago from 1955, and the chairman of the Cook County Democratic Party from 1953, until his death. He has been called "the last of the big city bosses" who controlled and mobilized American cities. He was the patriarch of a powerful Chicago political family. His son Richard M. Daley went on to serve as mayor of Chicago, and another son, William M. Daley, served as United States Secretary of Commerce and White House Chief of Staff.

As mayor, Daley is remembered for doing much to save Chicago from the declines that other Rust Belt cities, such as Cleveland and Detroit, experienced during the same period. He lived his entire life in the working-class, heavily Irish American neighborhood of Bridgeport on Chicago's South Side. Daley had a strong base of support in Chicago's Irish Catholic community and was treated by national politicians such as Lyndon B. Johnson as a pre-eminent Irish American, with special connections to the Kennedy family. Daley played a major role in the history of the Democratic Party, especially with his support of John F. Kennedy in the presidential election of 1960 and of Hubert Humphrey in the presidential election of 1968. He was the longest-serving mayor in Chicago history until his record was broken by his son Richard M. Daley in 2011. He has been ranked by some historians as among the ten best mayors in American history.

Daley's legacy is complicated by criticisms of machine politics or Chicago-style politics. His response to the Chicago riots that followed the assassination of Martin Luther King Jr. and his handling of the notorious 1968 Democratic National Convention held in his city are seen as failures. During his tenure, he also had enemies within the Democratic Party. In addition, many members of Daley's administration were charged with and convicted of corruption, although Daley himself was never charged with any crime.

== Early life and education ==
Richard J. Daley was born in Bridgeport, a working-class neighborhood of Chicago. He was the only child of Michael and Lillian (Dunne) Daley, whose families had both arrived from the Old Parish area, near Dungarvan, County Waterford, Ireland, during the Great Famine. Richard's father was a sheet metal worker with a reserved demeanor. Michael's father, James E. Daley, was a butcher born in New York City, while his mother, Delia Gallagher Daley, was an Irish immigrant. Richard's mother was outgoing and outspoken. Before women obtained the right to vote in 1920, Lillian Daley was an active suffragette, participating in marches and often bringing her son to them. She hoped her son's life would be more professionally successful than that of his parents. Before his mother's death, Daley had won the Democratic nomination for Cook County sheriff. Lillian wanted more than this for her son, telling a friend, "I didn't raise my son to be a policeman." Daley would later state that his wellsprings were his religion, his family, his neighborhood, the Democratic Party, and his love of the city.

Daley attended the elementary school of his parish, Nativity of Our Lord, and De La Salle Institute (where he learned clerical skills) and took night classes at DePaul University College of Law to earn a Bachelor of Laws in 1933. As a young man, Daley's jobs included selling newspapers and making deliveries for a door-to-door peddler; he worked in Chicago's Union stock yards to pay his law school expenses. He spent his free time as a member of the Hamburg Athletic Club, an athletic, social, and political organization - which was also a street gang - near his home. Hamburg and similar clubs were funded, at least in part, by local Democratic politicians. Daley made his mark there, not in sports, but in organization as the club manager. At age 22, he was elected president of the club and served in that office until 1939. Although he practiced law with partner William J. Lynch, he dedicated the majority of his time to his political career.

== Political career ==
=== Early career ===
Daley at the time of his appointment as Chief Deputy County Comptroller, 1936

Daley's career in politics began when he became a Democratic precinct captain. Having served as secretary for previous County Treasurers Joseph B. McDonough, Thomas D. Nash, Robert M. Sweitzer, and Joseph L. Gill, he was appointed the Chief Deputy Comptroller of Cook County on December 17, 1936, to replace Michael J. O'Connor, who had died on December 9.

Daley's first elective office was in the Illinois House of Representatives, to which he was elected for the 9th district on November 3, 1936, alongside Democratic incumbents William J. Gormley and Peter P. Jezierny. Despite being a lifelong Democrat, he was elected to the office as a Republican. This was a matter of political opportunism and the peculiar setup for legislative elections in Illinois at the time, which allowed Daley to take the place on the ballot of the recently deceased Republican candidate David Shanahan. Daley's name was not printed on the ballot due to the closeness of Shanahan's death to the election, but he was able to defeat Shanahan's friend Robert E. Rodgers.

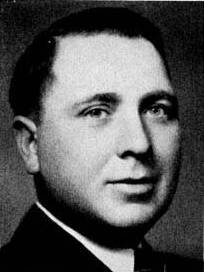
official portrait, circa 1937

After his election, Daley quickly moved back to the Democratic side of the aisle. After the death of incumbent Democratic Senator Patrick J. Carroll in 1938, Daley was elected to the Illinois Senate. That year Gormley and Jezierny were reelected with Republican William S. Finucane taking the third spot. In 1939, Illinois State Senator William "Botchy" Connors remarked of Daley: "You couldn't give that guy a nickel, that's how honest he is." Daley served as Minority Leader of the Illinois Senate from 1941 through 1946. He suffered his only political defeat in 1946, when he lost a bid to become Cook County sheriff.

In the late 1940s, Daley became Democratic Ward Committeeman of the 11th Ward, a post he retained until his death. He was appointed by Governor Adlai Stevenson II as head of the Illinois Department of Finance, serving in that role from 1949 through 1950, the year he made a successful run for Cook County Clerk. Daley held that position until being elected Chicago's mayor.

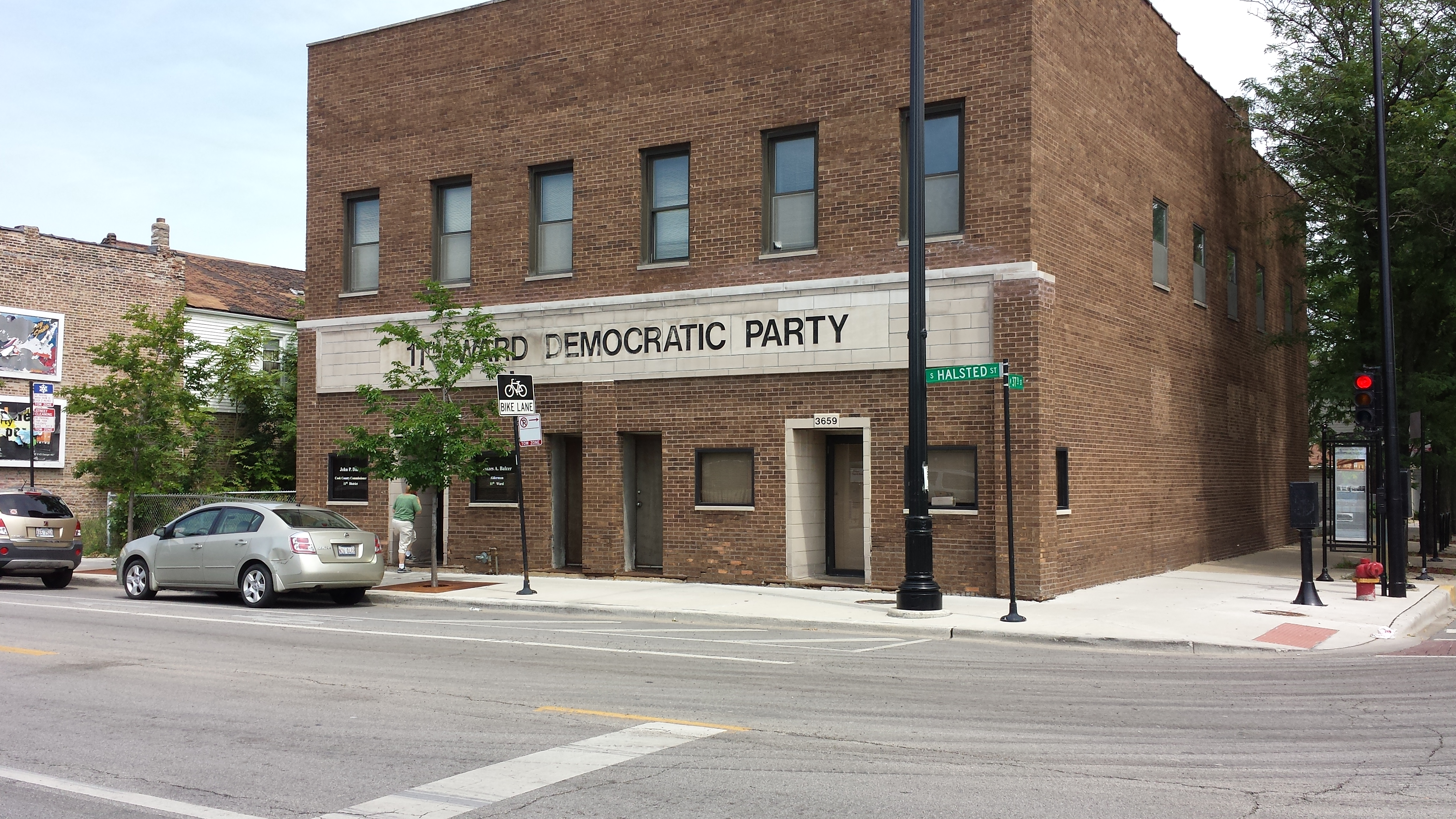
11th Ward Democratic committee office, Bridgeport, Chicago

Daley became chairman of the Central Committee of the Cook County Democratic Party, i.e., boss of the political machine, in 1953. Holding this position along with the mayoralty in later years enhanced Daley's power. A recorded phone conversation that Daley had with President Lyndon Johnson on January 27, 1968, revealed that despite his Irish Catholic background, Daley also privately had at times tense relations with the Kennedy family and that he had declined an offer to vote against President Harry Truman when he was serving as a delegate at the 1948 Democratic National Convention. Daley noted how he hurt the Kennedy effort against Truman by "buying" Ed Kelly and getting him off the Democratic National Committee.

=== Early mayoralty ===
Daley was first elected mayor, Chicago's 48th, in 1955. He was reelected to that office five times and had been mayor for 21 years at the time of his death. During his administration, Daley dominated the political arena of the city and, to a lesser extent, that of the entire state. Officially, Chicago has a "weak-mayor" system, in which most of the power is vested in the city council. However, Daley's post as de facto leader of the Chicago Democratic Party allowed him to rule the city with an iron hand and gave him great influence over the city's ward organizations, which in turn allowed him a considerable voice in Democratic primary contests—in most cases, the real contest in the Democratic stronghold of Chicago.

In 1959 and 1960, Daley served as president of the United States Conference of Mayors.

Daley contributed to John F. Kennedy's narrow, 8,000 vote victory in Illinois in 1960.

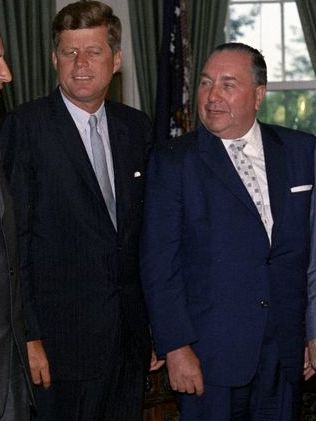
Daley with President Kennedy in 1962

Major construction during Daley's terms in office resulted in O'Hare International Airport, the Sears Tower, McCormick Place, the University of Illinois at Chicago, numerous expressways and subway construction projects, and other major Chicago landmarks. O'Hare was a particular point of pride for Daley, with he and his staff regularly devising occasions to celebrate it. It occasioned one of Daley's numerous clashes with community organizer Saul Alinsky. His black-neighborhood Woodlawn Organization threatened a mass "piss in" at the airport (a crowding of its toilets) to press demands for open employment.

Daley's construction of a modern Chicago rested on the commitment to racial segregation. Housing, highways, and schools were built to serve as barriers between white and black neighborhoods. To revitalize downtown Chicago Daley worked together with business leaders to push out poor black residents and replace them with middle class whites. To prevent black people from moving into white neighborhoods, Daley oversaw the building of public housing in the form of high-rise towers like the Robert Taylor Homes that he placed within Chicago's black ghettos. Many were located along a single street in the ghetto of Chicago's South Side, which became known as the "State Street Corridor" and had the densest concentration of public housing in the nation. Daley was also responsible for routing the Dan Ryan Expressway along the neighborhood's traditional racial divide, so that it separated the State Street Corridor from the white neighborhoods of the South Side. Until the late 1960s, in municipal elections Daley nevertheless enjoyed 70 percent support within the black community. Like other ethnic groups in Chicago, black voters offered party loyalty and votes for political patronage.

From late 1965 to early 1967 Mayor Daley was confronted by the Chicago Freedom Movement to improve conditions in the black ghettos. On the one hand, the Chicago civil rights movement formed to fight for better schools. On the other hand, it advocated open housing in Chicago. The campaign, that became known as the Chicago Freedom Movement, was led by Martin Luther King Jr., who tried to employ the tactics of peaceful marches like he had in the South. Daley, with the help of black political leaders who did not want to break with Daley's political machine and the local press, avoided violent confrontations. In mid-August 1966 the "Summit Agreement" was achieved through a series of meetings. Among other things it brought about the creation of the Leadership Council for Metropolitan Open Communities. While this is a contentious issue, the Chicago Freedom Movement is widely considered a failure or at best a draw.

Daley discouraged motion picture and television filming on location in Chicago, after an episode of M Squad (aired on January 30, 1959) depicted an officer of CPD taking bribes. This policy lasted until the end of his term and would be reversed under later mayor Jane Byrne, when The Blues Brothers was filmed in Chicago. However during his time in office, movies including Cooley High, and others were filmed in Chicago.

=== 1968 and later career ===
The year 1968 was a momentous year for Daley. On January 27, Daley informed President Johnson that Robert F. Kennedy had met him and asked for his support in the upcoming Democratic primaries, which he declined. Daley also told Johnson that if Johnson did not campaign Daley thought should be drafted for the Presidential nominated at the Democratic National Convention. Two months later, Johnson announced he would not seek reelection.

In April, many castigated Daley for his sharp rhetoric in the aftermath of rioting that took place after King's assassination. Displeased with what he saw as an over-cautious police response to the rioting, Daley chastised police superintendent James B. Conlisk and subsequently related that conversation at a City Hall press conference as follows:

I said to him very emphatically and very definitely that an order be issued by him immediately to shoot to kill any arsonist or anyone with a Molotov cocktail in his hand, because they're potential murderers, and to shoot to maim or cripple anyone looting.

This statement generated significant controversy. Jesse Jackson, for example, called it "a fascist's response". Daley later backed away from his words in an address to the City Council, saying:

It is the established policy of the police department – fully supported by this administration – that only the minimum force necessary be used by policemen in carrying out their duties.

Later that month, Daley asserted,

There wasn't any shoot-to-kill order. That was a fabrication.

Robert Kennedy was also assassinated in June 1968, thus hurting Daley's earlier plan to make Johnson, who withdrew his re-election bid in March, Vice President.

In August, the 1968 Democratic National Convention was held in Chicago. Intended to showcase Daley's achievements to national Democrats and the news media, the proceedings during the convention instead garnered notoriety for the mayor and city, descending into verbal outbursts between participants, and a circus for the media. With the nation divided by the Vietnam War and with the assassinations of King and Kennedy earlier that year serving as backdrop, the city became a battleground for anti-war protesters who vowed to shut down the convention. In some cases, confrontations between protesters and police turned violent, with images of the chaos broadcast on national television. Later, anti-war activists Abbie Hoffman, Jerry Rubin, and three other members of the "Chicago Seven" were convicted of crossing state lines with the intent of inciting a riot as a result of these confrontations, though the convictions were overturned on appeal.

At the convention itself, Senator Abraham A. Ribicoff went off-script during his speech nominating George McGovern, saying, "And with George McGovern as President of the United States, we wouldn't have to have Gestapo tactics in the streets of Chicago. And with George McGovern as president, we wouldn't have to have a National Guard." Ribicoff, with his voice shaking, then said: "How hard it is to speak the truth, when we know the problems that are facing this nation", for which some in the crowd booed Ribicoff. Ribicoff also tried to introduce a motion to shut down the convention and move it to another city. Many conventioneers applauded Ribicoff's remarks, but an indignant Daley tried to shout down the speaker. As television cameras focused on Daley, lip-readers later said they observed him shouting, "Fuck you, you Jew son of a bitch, you lousy motherfucker, go home!" Defenders of the mayor later stated that he was calling Ribicoff a faker, a charge denied by Daley and refuted by Mike Royko's reporting. A federal commission, led by local attorney and party activist Dan Walker, investigated the events surrounding the convention and described them as a "police riot". Daley defended his police force with the following statement, which was also a slip of the tongue: "The confrontation was not caused by the police. The confrontation was caused by those who charged the police. Gentlemen, let's get this thing straight, once and for all. The policeman is not here to create disorder. The policeman is here to preserve disorder."

Public opinion polls conducted after the convention demonstrated that the majority of Americans supported Daley's tactics. Daley was historically re-elected for the fifth time in 1971. However, many have argued this was due to a lack of formidable opposition rather than Daley's own popularity. Democratic nominee McGovern threw Daley out of the 1972 Democratic National Convention, replacing his delegation with one led by Jesse Jackson. This event arguably marked a downturn in Daley's power and influence within the Democratic Party but given his public standing, McGovern later made amends by putting Daley loyalist (and Kennedy in-law) Sargent Shriver on his ticket. In January 1973, former Illinois Racing Board Chairman William S. Miller testified that Daley had "induced" him to bribe Illinois Governor Otto Kerner.

In the 1970 special election deciding whether or not Illinois would adopt its then-proposed state constitution, Daley came out in support of its adoption late in the campaign. His support may have ultimately been critical in influencing Illinois voters in their decision to ultimately adopt the proposed constitution. Daley was a strong proponent of Illinois having home rule for local government, and this constitution enshrined the ability for local governments to become home rule units.

Daley was reelected mayor for a (then-record) sixth term in 1975.

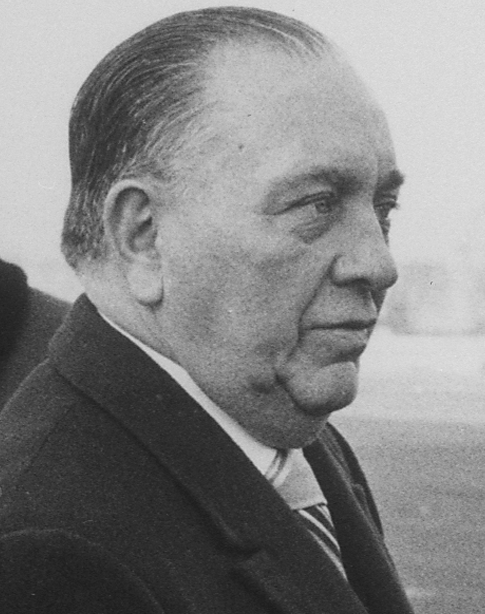
Daley in 1970

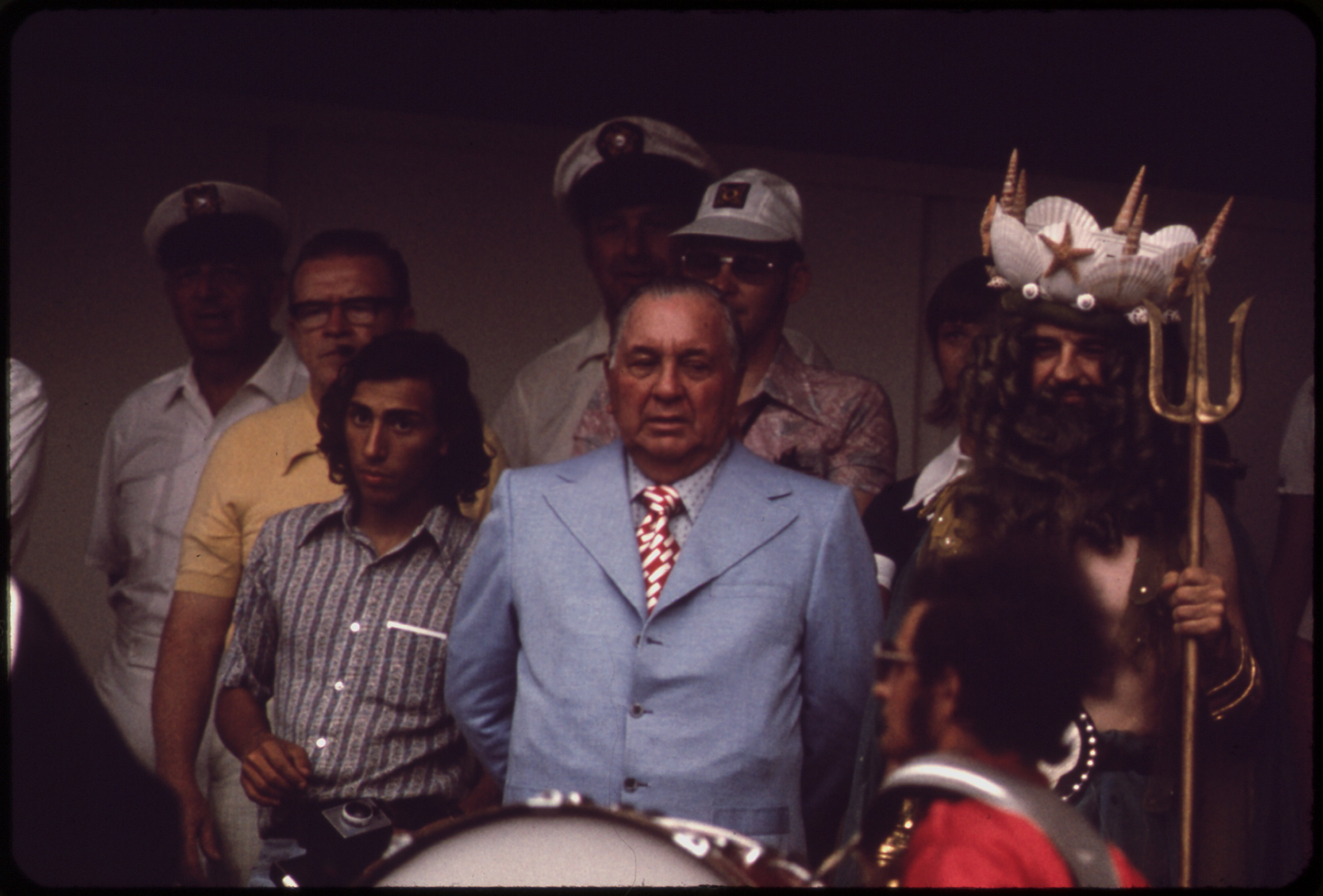
Daley at the opening day parade for the Lakefront Festival, 1973

== Death and funeral ==
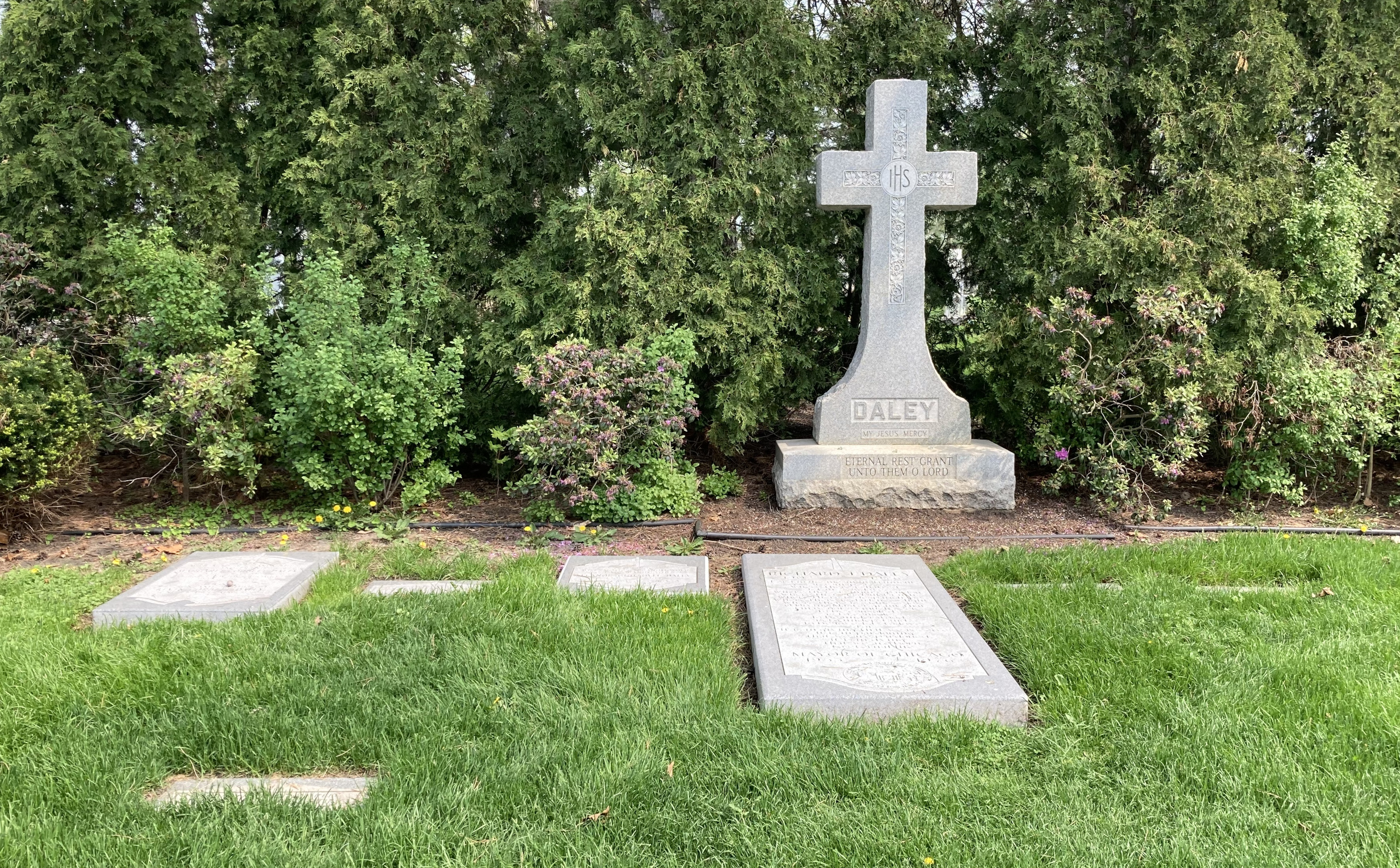
Daley's grave at Holy Sepulchre Cemetery

Shortly after 2:00 p.m. on December 20, 1976, Daley collapsed on the city's Near North Side while on his way to lunch. He was rushed to the office of his private physician at 900 North Michigan Avenue. It was confirmed that Daley had suffered a massive heart attack and he was pronounced dead at 2:55 p.m.; he was 74 years old.

Daley's funeral took place on December 22 at Nativity of Our Lord Catholic Church, Chicago, the church that he had attended since his childhood. Attending his funeral were Jimmy Carter (the U.S. president-elect) and Vice President Nelson Rockefeller. Daley is buried in Holy Sepulchre Cemetery in Worth Township, southwest of Chicago.

After a several-days-long dispute over who would become Chicago's acting mayor, a deal was brokered that resulted in Michael A. Bilandic being appointed acting mayor by the city council. Similtaneously, George W. Dunne (the president of the Cook County Board of Commissioners) was chosen to be Daley's successor as chair of the Cook County Democratic Party.

== Personal life and family ==
Daley met Eleanor "Sis" Guilfoyle at a local ball game. He courted "Sis" for six years, during which time he finished law school and was established in his legal profession. They were married on June 17, 1936, and lived in a modest brick bungalow at 3536 South Lowe Avenue in the heavily Irish and Polish neighborhood of Bridgeport, a few blocks from his birthplace. They had three daughters and four sons, in that order. Their eldest son, Richard M. Daley, was elected mayor of Chicago in 1989, and served in that position until his retirement in 2011. The youngest son, William M. Daley, served as White House Chief of Staff under President Barack Obama and as US Secretary of Commerce under President Bill Clinton. Another son, John P. Daley, is a member of the Cook County Board of Commissioners. The other progeny has stayed out of public life. Michael Daley is a partner in the law firm Daley & George, and Mary Carol (Daley) Vanecko, who died in 2025, was a teacher, as were Patricia (Daley) Martino, who died in 2024, and Eleanor, who died in 1998.

=== Speaking style ===
Quotations related to Richard J. Daley at Wikiquote

Daley, who never lost his blue-collar Chicago accent, was known for often mangling his syntax and other verbal gaffes. Daley made one of his most memorable verbal missteps in 1968, while defending what the news media reported as police misconduct during that year's violent Democratic convention, stating, "Gentlemen, get the thing straight once and for all – the policeman isn't there to create disorder, the policeman is there to preserve disorder." Daley's reputation for misspeaking was such that his press secretary Earl Bush would tell reporters, "Write what he means, not what he says."

== Legacy ==
A 1993 survey of historians, political scientists and urban experts conducted by Melvin G. Holli of the University of Illinois at Chicago saw Daley ranked as the fifth best American big-city mayor to serve between the years 1820 and 1993. The survey also saw Daley ranked the best big-city mayor to serve in office post-1960. A 1994 survey of experts on Chicago politics saw Daley ranked as one of the ten best mayors in the city's history (up to that time).

On the 50th anniversary of Daley's first 1955 swearing-in, several dozen Daley biographers and associates met at the Chicago Historical Society. Historian Michael Beschloss called Daley "the pre-eminent mayor of the 20th century". Robert Remini pointed out that while other cities were in fiscal crisis in the 1960s and 1970s, "Chicago always had a double-A bond rating." According to Chicago folksinger Steve Goodman, "no man could inspire more love, more hate".

Through patronage and slate-making, Daley exerted control over the local Democratic Party. These decisions shaped the course of Illinois politics for decades. Notable politicians such as Michael A. Bilandic, Jane Byrne, Neil Hartigan, Dan Rostenkowski, Bill Lipinski, and Mike Madigan all initially emerged from Daley’s political orbit.

Daley's twenty-one-year tenure as mayor is memorialized in the following public buildings:

- A week after his death, the former William J. Bogan Junior College, one of the City Colleges of Chicago, was renamed as the Richard J. Daley College in his honor.
- The Richard J. Daley Center (originally, the Chicago Civic Center) is a 32-floor office building completed in 1965 and renamed for the mayor after his death.
- The Richard J. Daley Library, the primary academic library at the University of Illinois at Chicago.
- The Richard J. Daley Branch of the Chicago Public Library in Bridgeport, Daley's home community, dedicated February 1, 1989.

Journalists Adam Cohen and Elizabeth Taylor argue that Daley's politics may have saved Chicago from the same fate that cities like Detroit, Kansas City, St. Louis and Cleveland endured, which suffered from suburbanization, crime and white flight. "But for every middle-class neighborhood he saved, there was a poor neighborhood in which living conditions worsened. For every downtown skyscraper that kept jobs and tax dollars in the city, there was a housing project tower that confined poor people in an overcrowded ghetto".

Daley was known by many Chicagoans as "Da Mare" ("The Mayor"), "Hizzoner" ("His Honor"), and "The Man on Five" (his office was on the fifth floor of City Hall). Since Daley's death and the subsequent election of son Richard as mayor in 1989, the first Mayor Daley has become known as "Boss Daley", "Old Man Daley", or "Daley Senior" to residents of Chicago.

During the civil rights era, some black Chicagoans referred to Daley as "Pharaoh", comparing him to the oppressive and unrelenting figure in the Book of Exodus. These claims were supported by Daley's role in the assassination of Fred Hampton and his anti-MLK stance.

== In popular culture ==
- The Crosby, Stills, Nash and Young song "Chicago" (written by Graham Nash) was about the 1968 Democratic convention. In their live album 4 Way Street, Nash ironically dedicates the song to "Mayor Daley".
- The first verse Steve Goodman's original 1972 version of "The Lincoln Park Pirates" contains the line, "the stores are all closing and Daley is dozing". Following Daley's death, Goodman replaced the reference with "... and Bilandic's been chosen". Goodman also wrote and recorded a song called "Daley's Gone", which appeared on his 1977 album Say It in Private.
- Songwriters Tom Walsh, Tom Black and Terry McEldowney pay homage to Daley in "South Side Irish", making him the subject of the entire third verse.
- In episode 13 of the third season of Saturday Night Live, a sketch entitled "Miracle in Chicago" portrays Mayor Daley (played by John Belushi) appearing as a ghost to a pub owner and a customer (played respectively by Dan Aykroyd and Bill Murray). Daley has come back to give the new Mayor a few electoral tips and complain about his burial site. Before disappearing again, he helps the owner get the popular Irish song "Too Ra Loo Ra Loo Ral" on his juke box and leaves him a gift turkey.
- In a scene set at the Chez Paul restaurant in the 1980 film The Blues Brothers, the maître d'hôtel (Alan Rubin) is seen talking on the phone: "No, sir, Mayor Daley no longer dines here, sir. He's dead, sir." Later in the film, when the brothers are driving rapidly through Chicago, Elwood (Dan Aykroyd) comments "If my estimations are correct, we should be very close to the Honorable Richard J. Daley Plaza". "That's where they got that Picasso!" Jake enthuses. The classic "use of unnecessary violence in the apprehension of the Blues Brothers has been approved" line delivered by a police dispatcher is an obvious homage to Daley's 1968 order during the riots following Martin Luther King's assassination.

== See also ==
- Timeline of Chicago, 1950s–1970s

Political offices
| Preceded by Martin H. Kennelly | Mayor of Chicago; April 20, 1955 – December 20, 1976 | Succeeded by Michael A. Bilandic |
