= Richard M. Daley =

Mayor of Chicago from 1989 to 2011

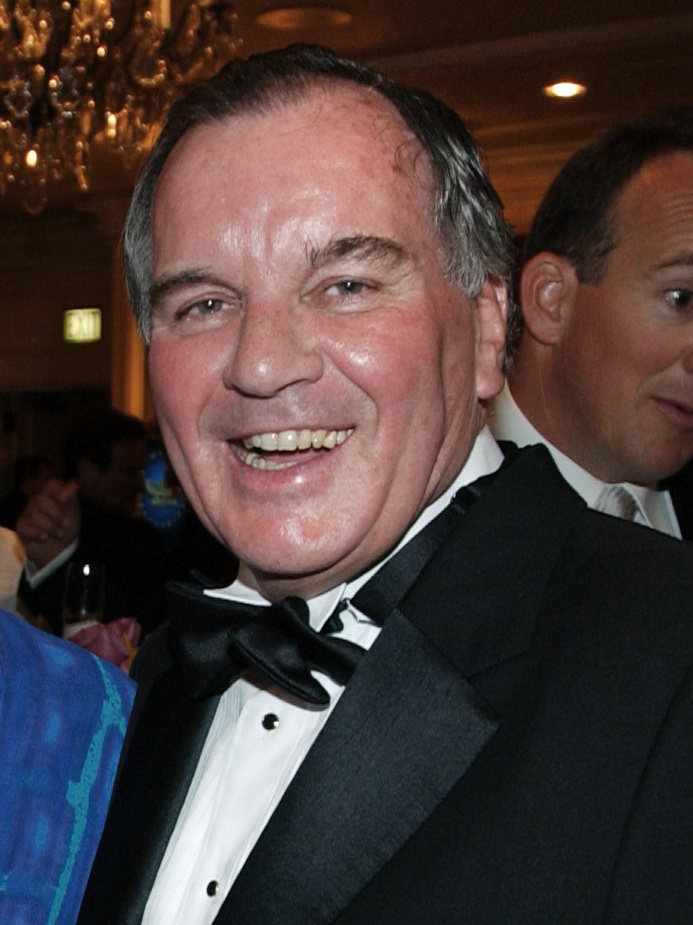
- Daley in 2006

54th Mayor of Chicago
- In office April 24, 1989 – May 16, 2011
- Deputy: Terry Gabinski; Bernard Stone
- Preceded by: Eugene Sawyer
- Succeeded by: Rahm Emanuel

54th President of the United States Conference of Mayors
- In office 1996–1997
- Preceded by: Norm Rice
- Succeeded by: Paul Helmke

Cook County State's Attorney
- In office December 1, 1980 – April 24, 1989
- Preceded by: Bernard Carey
- Succeeded by: Cecil Partee

Member of the Illinois Senate from the 23rd district
- In office January 10, 1973 – December 1, 1980
- Preceded by: Edward Nihill
- Succeeded by: Timothy F. Degnan

Personal details
- Born: Richard Michael Daley; April 24, 1942 (age 84) Chicago, Illinois, U.S.
- Party: Democratic
- Spouse: Margaret Ann Corbett (m. 1972; died 2011)
- Children: 4, including Patrick
- Parents: Richard J. Daley (father); Eleanor Guilfoyle (mother)
- Relatives: John P. Daley (brother); William M. Daley (brother); Patrick Daley Thompson (nephew)
- Education: Providence College; DePaul University (BA, JD)

Richard Michael Daley (born April 24, 1942) is an American politician who served as the 54th mayor of Chicago, Illinois, from 1989 to 2011. Daley was elected mayor in 1989 and was reelected five times until declining to run for a seventh term. At 22 years, his was the longest tenure in Chicago mayoral history, surpassing the 21-year mayoralty of his father, Richard J. Daley.

As Mayor, Daley took over the Chicago Public Schools, developed tourism, oversaw the construction of Millennium Park, increased environmental efforts and the rapid development of the city's central business district downtown and adjacent near North, South and West sides. He also approved expansion of city workers' benefits to their partners regardless of gender, and advocated for gun control.

Daley received criticism when family, personal friends, and political allies disproportionately benefited from city contracting. He took office in a city with regular annual budget surpluses and left the city with massive structural deficits. His budgets ran up the largest deficits in Chicago history. A national leader in privatization, he temporarily reduced budgetary shortfalls by leasing and selling public assets to private corporations, but this practice removed future sources of revenue, contributing to the city's near insolvency at the end of his tenure. Police brutality was also a recurring issue during his mayorship.

== Early and personal life ==
Richard M. Daley is the fourth of seven children and eldest son of Richard J. and Eleanor Daley, who later became Mayor and First Lady of Chicago in 1955. Born on April 24, 1942, he grew up in Bridgeport, a historically Irish-American neighborhood located on Chicago's South Side. Daley is a brother of William M. Daley, former White House Chief of Staff and former United States Secretary of Commerce under President Bill Clinton; John P. Daley, a commissioner on the Cook County Board of Commissioners and chairman of the Board's Finance Committee; and Michael Daley, an attorney with Daley & Georges, a law firm founded by their father Richard J. Daley, that specializes in zoning law and is often hired by developers to help get zoning changes through city hall. Daley was married to Margaret "Maggie" Corbett until her death on Thanksgiving Day, November 24, 2011 after a decade-long battle with metastatic breast cancer, which had spread to her bones and liver. Maggie Daley Park in the Chicago Loop commemorates her, and her nonprofit After School Matters continues to serve Chicago's young people. They have four children: Nora, Patrick, Elizabeth and Kevin, all born at Mercy Hospital and Medical Center in Chicago. Their second son, Kevin, died at age two of complications from spina bifida in 1981. Daley was raised Roman Catholic.

Daley graduated from De La Salle Institute high school in Chicago and obtained his bachelor's degree from DePaul University in 1964, having transferred from Providence College in Providence, Rhode Island after two years. In 1962, at age 19, home on Christmas break, Daley was ticketed for running a stop sign at Huron and Rush, and the Chicago Sun-Times headline was "Mayor's Son Gets Ticket, Uses No Clout," with a subhead reading "Quiet Boy."

Sources conflict on Daley's military record. The only book-length biography of Daley makes no mention of military service. A 1995 profile in the Chicago Sun-Times stated that Daley served in the United States Marine Corps Reserve from 1961 to 1967, while a 1996 profile in People Magazine cited 1960 to 1964. A civilian website for Marines and their families found no military record for Daley.

Daley earned a Juris Doctor degree from DePaul University. He passed the Illinois Bar Examination on his third try. Daley later reflected, "I flunked the bar exam twice. I had to keep studying harder and harder and harder. I passed it the third time." Daley never tried a case.

== Early political career ==
Daley was elected to his first office as a delegate to the 1969 Illinois Constitutional Convention, which created the current Constitution of Illinois (adopted after voters approved it in a 1970 special election). According to journalist Rick Perlstein, in June 1972, Daley led a mob on behalf of his father's Democratic Party regulars against pro-McGovern reformers meeting in a church in Illinois' Fifth Congressional District. The action was unsuccessful and the reformers' slate (which included Rev. Jesse Jackson) replaced the Daley slate at the Democratic National Convention in Miami Beach, Florida.

After his father died in 1976, Daley succeeded his father as the 11th Ward Democratic committeeman, a party post, until succeeded in the post by his brother John P. Daley in 1980. With John P. Daley holding the post from 1980 to the present, a Daley has held the post of 11th Ward Committeeman for 60 years.

=== Illinois State Senate (1972–1980) ===
After Edward Nihill stepped down, Daley, with the support of the Democratic political organization, was elected to the Illinois Senate, serving from 1972 to 1980. State Senator Daley rarely spoke to reporters and didn't hold a news conference for six years. Daley chaired the Senate Judiciary Committee. Daley was named one of Illinois' ten worst state legislators by Chicago Magazine "for arrogance, for sharklike qualities, for living off his father's name, and for pulling puppet strings attached to some of the worst members of the Senate." He was considered "too shrewd to be one of the worst, but he controls so many of the worst senators that he belongs on the list to represent all of them." After the Spring 1975 state legislative session, Chicago Democrat Dawn Clark Netsch, who served with Daley as Illinois Constitutional Convention delegates and as State Senators, blamed "dirty little Richie" for frustrating her good government legislative agenda in the state legislature.

=== Cook County State's Attorney (1981–1989) ===
In 1980, Daley challenged incumbent Republican Bernard Carey for Cook County State's Attorney. Democratic Mayor Jane Byrne endorsed Alderman Edward M. Burke in the Democratic primary, and after Daley prevailed in the primary, endorsed Carey in the general election. Daley prevailed and served from 1981 to 1989. His election over Carey saw him win by merely sixteen thousand votes, one of the narrowest wins for the Cook County State's Attorney election.

==== Police torture reported to Daley, 1982 ====
In February 1982, Andrew Wilson was arrested for the murder of two Chicago police officers. Wilson was taken to Area 2 detective headquarters on the South Side for interrogation under Chicago Police Detective Jon Burge. Dr. John Raba, Medical Director of Cermak Health Services, the prison hospital in the Cook County Hospital system, examined Wilson, determined Wilson had been tortured, and complained in writing to then Chicago Police Superintendent Richard J. Brzeczek:

I examined Mr. Andrew Wilson on February 15 & 16, 1982. He had multiple bruises, swellings and abrasions on his face and head. His right eye was battered and had a superficial laceration. Andrew Wilson had several linear blisters on his right thigh, right cheek and anterior chest which were consistent with radiator burns. He stated he'd been cuffed to a radiator and pushed into it. He also stated that electrical shocks had been administered to his gums, lips and genitals. All these injuries occurred prior to his arrival at the Jail. There must be a thorough investigation of this alleged brutality.

Brzeczek forwarded the letter to State's Attorney Daley. Daley never replied, and charges were never brought against any officers. Daley's prosecutors convicted Wilson and his brother Jackie of murder, and Andrew Wilson was sentenced to death. On April 2, 1987, the Illinois Supreme Court overturned the convictions, ruling that Wilson was forced to confess involuntarily after being beaten by police.

=== First campaign for mayor: 1983 challenge to Jane Byrne ===
In November 1982, Daley announced his first campaign for mayor. The candidates in the three-way Democratic primary, which included incumbent Mayor Jane Byrne, a former protégée of his father, and Congressman Harold Washington, held a series of four televised debates. Daley finished third. Many of Richard J.'s political allies blamed Richard M. for splitting the white vote, enabling Washington to become Chicago's first black mayor.

=== Second campaign for mayor: 1989 victory over Eugene Sawyer ===
On November 25, 1987, Mayor Washington died in office of a heart attack. On December 2, 1987, the Chicago City Council appointed Alderman Eugene Sawyer as mayor until a special election for the remaining two years of the term could be held in 1989. Daley announced his candidacy on December 6, 1988, saying

Let's face it: we have a problem in Chicago. The name-calling and politics at City Hall are keeping us from tackling the real issues ... I may not be the best speaker in town, but I know how to run a government and how to bring people together.

Rahm Emanuel worked for the Daley campaign as a fundraiser, David Axelrod as campaign strategist, William M. Daley as chief strategist, and Forrest Claypool as a campaign aide. Among four Daley campaign appearances on a Sunday shortly before the primary was a rally of Polish Highlanders at 4808 S. Archer Ave. In a videotaped television newscast, it appeared that Daley said, "You want a white mayor to sit down with everybody." Sawyer said he was "shocked." Daley explained, "It was my standard stump speech. I'm not maybe the best speaker in town, but I have never used the word [white]." That Friday, the campaign watchdog group CONDUCT censured Daley and commended Sawyer for his "rejection of racially inflammatory comments."

Daley defeated Sawyer in the primary. In the 1989 general election, Daley faced Republican candidate Edward Vrdolyak, a former Democratic alderman who had opposed Mayor Washington, and Alderman Timothy C. Evans, the candidate of the newly created Harold Washington Party. Daley won the general election on April 4, 1989. Daley was inaugurated as Mayor of Chicago on April 24, 1989, his 47th birthday, at a ceremony in Orchestra Hall.

== Mayor of Chicago (1989–2011) ==
=== First term (1989–1991) ===
Daley presided over the most docile City Council since his father. One of the new mayor's first acts was to appropriate the City Council's power to approve city contracts, a right aldermen exercised under former Mayors Washington and Sawyer. Daley's first budget proposal, the 1990 budget, included $3 billion in spending, (Note: equivalent to $6.524026302×10^{9} in 2025) $50 million more than 1989, (Note: equivalent to $108,733,772 in 2025) featured a $25 million reduction in the property tax levy, (Note: equivalent to $54,366,886 in 2025) extended Mayor Sawyer's hiring freeze, piloted recycling, and privatized the city's tow truck fleet. Daley became the first Chicago Mayor to lead Chicago's Gay and Lesbian Pride Parade, at the 20th annual parade on Sunday, June 26, 1989. On August 22, 1990, Daley told reporters that "people are getting hurt in drive-by shoot-a-longs." In December 1990, Amnesty International issued a report "Allegations of Police Torture in Chicago, Illinois" calling for a full inquiry into allegations that some Chicago police officers tortured criminal suspects between 1972 and 1984.

=== Second term (1991–1995) ===
On April 2, 1991, Daley was reelected to a second term (his first full, four-year term), with 70.7% of the vote, over African American civil rights attorney and Appellate Judge R. Eugene Pincham. Questioned about the city's rising homicide rate on September 10, 1991, Daley said "The more killing and homicides you have, the more havoc it prevents."

A 1994 survey of experts on Chicago politics saw Daley assessed as one of the ten best (Note: The others in the top-ten were Anton Cermak (mayor 1931–33); Richard J. Daley (mayor 1955–76); Edward Fitzsimmons Dunne (mayor 1905–07); Carter Harrison III (mayor 1879–1887 and 1893); Carter Harrison IV (mayor 1897–1905 and 1911–15); Edward Joseph Kelly (mayor 1933–47); William B. Ogden (mayor 1837–38); Harold Washington (mayor 1983–87); John Wentworth (mayor 1857–58 and 1860–61)) mayors in the city's history (up to that time).

==== Brawl at Daley home in Michigan ====
On the weekend of March 1–2, 1992, Daley and his wife arranged for 16-year-old son Patrick to stay with relatives while they attended a family event in New York. Patrick told the relatives he was staying with friends, drove his father's new sports utility vehicle to the Daley second home in Grand Beach, Michigan and threw a party Saturday night without parental consent or adult supervision. Someone asked two Filipino and two white youths to leave, racial epithets were exchanged, and a fistfight broke out. Patrick retrieved Richard J. Daley's shotgun from the house and gave it to his cousin, who was aged 17. A youth was seriously injured when a juvenile struck him in the head with a baseball bat. On Monday a sobbing Mayor Daley read a statement at a City Hall press conference, pausing repeatedly as he tried to maintain his composure,

I am very disappointed, as any parent would be, after his son held a party in their home while his parents were away. I am more deeply distressed for the welfare of the young man who was injured in this fight.

Patrick pleaded guilty to misdemeanor charges of furnishing alcohol to minors and disturbing the peace and was sentenced to six months' probation, 50 hours of community service in Grand Beach, fined $1,950 (Note: equivalent to $4,474 in 2025) and ordered to pay restitution to his parents for property damage. His cousin pleaded guilty to aiming a firearm without malice and was fined $1,235. (Note: equivalent to $2,833 in 2025) Sixteen other youths were charged with juvenile and adult offenses. The injured youth recovered.

=== Third term (1995–1999) ===
Joseph E. Gardner ran against Daley and lost.

Daley took control of the Chicago Public Schools system in 1995 and appointed Paul Vallas. When Vallas left the post to run for governor, Daley chose the relatively obscure Arne Duncan, who later became the U.S. Secretary of Education under Barack Obama, to lead the district. On March 19, 1997, the Chicago City Council adopted the Domestic Partners Ordinance, which made employee benefits available to same-sex partners of City employees. Daley said it was an issue of fairness.

==== Daley's floor leader in City Council resigns ====
The first major public corruption scandal of Daley's tenure as mayor involved the circumstances of the resignation of his City Council floor leader, Alderman Patrick Huels, in October 1997. Daley, Huels, and another close friend Michael Tadin grew up within two blocks on S. Emerald Avenue in Bridgeport. Huels attended De La Salle Institute, the same high school attended by Daley, his father, and Michael Bilandic. Huels worked for the city's Public Works Department as a laborer and tree trimmer, then as an administrative assistant in the Environment Department, and then as a City Council investigator. He answered phones for the 11th Ward Democratic organization, and was its secretary for several years. When Mayor Richard J. Daley died, 11th Ward Alderman Bilandic was named acting mayor, and Huels, then 26, replaced Bilandic as alderman. Huels chaired the council's Transportation Committee and became Mayor Richard M. Daley's floor leader. In the summer of 2007, in reaction to ongoing indictments and convictions of aldermen, Daley and Huels shepherded a package of ethics reforms through city council. Huels owned a security firm, SDI Security, Inc. along with his wife and his brother, a Chicago police lieutenant. In the mid-1990s, the firm had about 390 full-time employees and was grossing $7 million a year. Huels was president and a director, and Council Finance Committee Chairman Alderman Edward M. Burke (14th) was secretary. Huels and Burke authorized $633,971 (Note: equivalent to $1,339,522 in 2025) in legal consulting fees from their respective Council committees to attorney Michael A. Pedicone, a long-time officer of SDI. In March 1995 the Internal Revenue Service placed a lien on SDI for $326,951 (Note: equivalent to $690,817 in 2025) and in June 1996 for $997,382 (Note: equivalent to $2,047,458 in 2025) for failing to pay payroll taxes, including money withheld from its employees' pay checks.

In 1970, after high school, Tadin went to work for Marina Cartage; within a decade, he owned the company, and over the next 15 years expanded it from 20 trucks to 150. Between 1992 and 1997, the city paid Marina Cartage and another Tadin company $49 million for supplying the city with snow removal and other heavy equipment and operators. Tadin earned millions of dollars by buying land cheaply, then leasing or selling it to the city. Marina Cartage used Huels' SDI Security services since 1992. In 1995, with Huels' support, the City Council approved a tax reduction which halved the assessment on a new $4.5 million (Note: equivalent to $8,671,896 in 2025) headquarters and trucking terminal for Marina Cartage at 4450 S. Morgan in Huels' ward, a tax savings of as much as $80,000 (Note: equivalent to $169,033 in 2025) per year. In 1996, with Huels' support, the City Council approved a $1.1 million (Note: equivalent to $2,081,543 in 2025) direct grant for the construction of the facility. Weeks later, Tadin created a new company which was used to originate a $1.25 million (Note: equivalent to $2,566,041 in 2025) bailout loan to SDI. Daley said Huels "did the right thing resigning" and claimed no knowledge of Huels' business dealings. "I don't get into people's private lives. I am not into that," Daley said. Daley announced an executive order and new ethics legislation, saying:

The goal of this executive order is to help address questions about favoritism in city contracting by preventing conflicts of interest, or even the appearance of such conflicts. ... There should be a level playing field, where no one has an advantage—or a disadvantage—in obtaining city contracts, simply because they know me or anyone else in government. ... Under the steps I'm taking today and recommending to the City Council, the public can easily learn everything there is to know about a city contract: who is involved, who will benefit and whether the city is paying a fair price. I and every other city official must be prepared to defend every contract on its merits.

=== Fourth term (1999–2003) ===
On February 23, 1999, Daley won reelection to a fourth term with 68.9 percent of the vote over challenger U.S. Congressman Bobby Rush. In August 1999, prompted by police excessive-force incidents in Chicago, New York and other cities, the U.S. affiliate of Amnesty International issued a report "Race, Rights & Brutality: Portraits of Abuse in the USA," that called on federal officials to better document excessive-force cases and to pursue prosecutions of the officers involved. In October 1999, the organization issued a report "Summary of Amnesty International's concerns on police abuse in Chicago" which expressed concerns including improper interrogation tactics, excessive force, shootings of unarmed suspects, and the detention and interrogation of children.

The Duff family formed a janitorial services company, Windy City Maintenance Inc., one month after Daley's inauguration. Bruce DuMont, president of the Museum of Broadcast Communications, said that Daley recommended that DuMont's wife Kathy Osterman, then director of the Mayor's Office of Special Events, award city contracts to Duff family companies. Daley denied steering contracts to the Duffs, and said he would "look into" the allegations, while stopping short of promising to do so, saying "I don't promise. That's the wrong word to use. You know ... promising, promising. We do look into it, yes." In September 2003, a federal investigation led to indictments of Patricia Green Duff, her sons John M. Duff and James Duff, and others on charges they won nearly $100 million (Note: equivalent to $167,484,742 in 2025) in city contracts through the city's set-aside program by misrepresenting their companies as women- and minority-owned. John M. Duff pleaded guilty to 33 counts of racketeering, fraud and other charges on January 10, 2004. A 1978 state law designed by Illinois Democrats gave the Mayor the power to appoint to fill vacancies in the City Council rather than holding special elections, and by 2002 more than a third of the council's 50 aldermen were initially appointed by Daley. The Council became even more of a rubber stamp than in Richard J. Daley's terms. In the 18 months from January 12, 2000 to June 6, 2001, only 13 votes in the council were divided, less than one a month. 32 aldermen supported the mayor 90-100% of the time and another 14 80-89% of the time.

=== Fifth term (2003–2007) ===
On February 26, 2003, Daley took 78.5% of the vote to prevail over challenger Reverend Paul Jakes Jr. Daley endorsed same-sex marriage, saying on February 18, 2004, he would have "no problem" with Cook County issuing marriage licenses to gay couples. Time magazine in its April 25, 2005 issue named Daley as the best out of five mayors of large cities in the United States, and characterized Daley as having "imperial" style and power. In May 2006, in Geneva, Switzerland the United Nations Committee Against Torture released a report which noted the "limited investigation and lack of prosecution" into allegations of torture in Areas 2 and 3 of the Chicago Police Department and called on American authorities to "promptly, thoroughly and impartially" investigate the allegations, and provide the committee with more information. Daley was inducted into the Chicago Gay and Lesbian Hall of Fame in 2006 as a Friend of the Community.

==== Daley orders demolition of Meigs Field ====
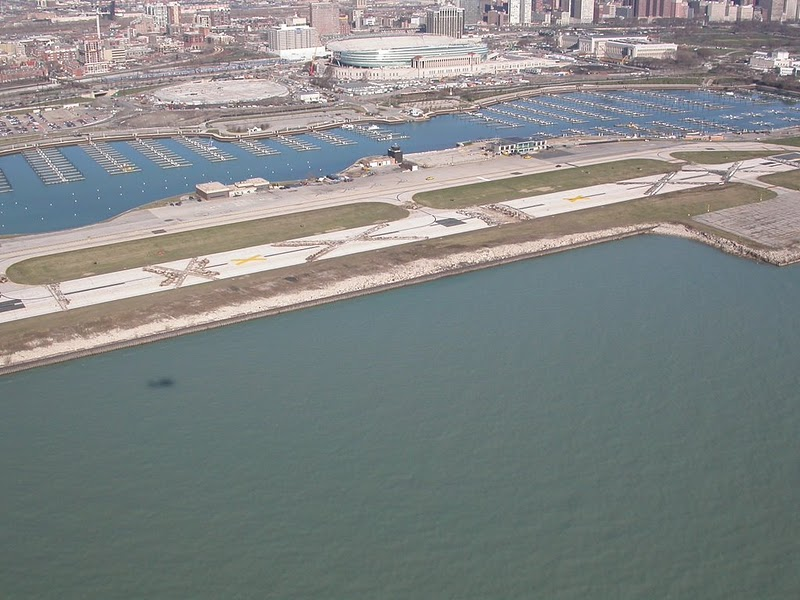
Meigs Field Runway a few days after destruction ordered by Mayor Daley, April 2003

A long-standing agreement between the city and state required the city to maintain and operate Meigs Field, a small, downtown, lakefront airport on Northerly Island used by general aviation aircraft and helicopters, until 2011 or turn it over to the state. On September 12, 1996, the City Council approved Daley's plan to convert the airport into a park, and the state began planning to take over operation of the airport. Fresh off a 2003 re-election mandate, one of Daley's first major acts was ordering the demolition of Meigs Field. On Sunday, March 30, 2003, shortly before midnight, transport trucks carrying construction equipment moved onto Meigs with Chicago Police escort. By early Monday morning, city crews excavated six large X's into the only runway. The city's 50 aldermen, Illinois Governor Rod Blagojevich, the Federal Aviation Administration and the Department of Homeland Security were not consulted on the plan. The demolition of the runway trapped planes. In the days following, many of those aircraft were able to take off using the taxiway.

"To do this any other way would have been needlessly contentious," Daley explained at a news conference Monday morning. Daley argued that the airport was a threat to Chicago's high-rise cityscape and its high-profile skyscrapers, such as the Sears Tower and the John Hancock Center. Daley criticized the Federal Aviation Administration, saying "Now, think of that; Mickey and Minnie have it. I mean, I can't believe that. They get it first before we get it?", referring to the post-9/11 air space restrictions in place over Orlando, Florida. "The signature act of Richard Daley's 22 years in office was the midnight bulldozing of Meigs Field," according to Chicago Tribune columnist Eric Zorn. "He ruined Meigs because he wanted to, because he could," Chicago Tribune columnist John Kass wrote of Daley. "The issue is Daley's increasingly authoritarian style that brooks no disagreements, legal challenges, negotiations, compromise or any of that messy give-and-take normally associated with democratic government," the Chicago Tribune editorialized. The Federal Aviation Administration cited the city for failure to comply with federal law requiring thirty-day advance notice to the FAA of plans for an airport closure. The city was fined $33,000, (Note: equivalent to $57,756 in 2025) the maximum allowable. The city paid the fine and repaid $1 million (Note: equivalent to $1,750,181 in 2025) in misspent federal airport development grants. Daley defended his actions by claiming that the airport was abandoned, in spite of the fact that the Chicago Fire Department had several helicopters based on the field at the time, in addition to the dozens of private aircraft left stranded.

==== Hired Truck Program scandal ====
The $40 million-a-year Hired Truck program was the biggest scandal of Daley's first 15 years as mayor. The Hired Truck Program hired private truck companies to do city work. A six-month investigation by the Chicago Sun-Times resulted in a three-day series of articles in January 2004 that revealed some participating companies were being paid for doing little or no work, had American Mafia connections or were tied to city employees, or paid bribes to get into the program. Between 1996 and 2004, companies in the Hired Truck Program gave more than $800,000 in campaign contributions to various politicians, including Daley, House Speaker Michael Madigan, and Governor Rod Blagojevich; Daley received at least $108,575 and his brother John Daley and his ward organization more than $47,500.

Mark Gyrion, Daley's second cousin, was a superintendent of garages for the city's Water Management Department, and among his duties was deciding when City-owned trucks should be sold for scrap. Gyrion's mother-in-law's firm, Jacz Transportation, participated in the Hired Truck Program, receiving about $1 million between 1998 and 2004. Jacz Transportation bought a truck three days after the city sold it to a Franklin Park dealership and then leased it back to the city. Gyrion was accused of failing to disclose his mother-in-law's role in the Hired Truck Program and the transfer of the truck. Gyrion was fired and Jacz Transportation was one of 13 truck companies suspended from the Hired Truck program. About 35% of the 70 firms in the program were suspended or referred to the city's Inspector General. The program was overhauled in 2004, and phased out in 2005.

==== Daley patronage chief among officials convicted of fraud ====
On July 5, 2006, Robert Sorich, formally, director of the Mayor's Office of Intergovernmental Affairs and, informally, Daley's patronage chief, and Timothy McCarthy, Sorich's aide, were each convicted on two counts of mail fraud connected to rigging blue-collar city jobs and promotions. Sorich's best friend, former Streets and Sanitation official Patrick Slattery was convicted of one count of mail fraud. A former Streets and Sanitation managing deputy commissioner was found guilty of lying to federal agents about political hiring. Sorich, McCarthy and Slattery lived in the Bridgeport neighborhood in 11th Ward, the Daley family's home neighborhood and ward. "I've never known them to be anything but hard working, and I feel for them at this difficult time," Daley said. "It is fair criticism to say I should have exercised greater oversight to ensure that every worker the city hired, regardless of who recommended them, was qualified and that proper procedures were always followed," Daley admitted a few days later. Weeks later, David Axelrod, a Democratic political consultant whose clients included Daley, defended patronage in an op-ed in the Chicago Tribune.

==== Daley son concealed city contracting ====
Mayor Daley's son Patrick R. Daley was an MBA student at the University of Chicago Graduate School of Business working as an unpaid intern at Cardinal Growth, a Chicago venture capital firm, when he profited from two Cardinal Growth ventures formed to win city contracts while concealing his role. Patrick's cousin, and Mayor Daley's nephew, is Robert G. Vanecko. In June 2003, Patrick and Vanecko formed a Delaware company, MSS Investors LLC, and invested $65,000 each. (Note: equivalent to $113,762 in 2025) MSS Investors LLC in turn purchased a 5% stake in Municipal Sewer Services, a Cardinal Growth venture. Patrick and Vanecko failed to disclose their ownership stake in Municipal Sewer Services as required by city ethics ordinances. Brunt Brothers Transfer Inc. was one of the largest black-owned contractors in the Hired Truck program. Municipal Sewer Services partnered with Brunt Brothers Transfer Inc. in their bid for City sewer-inspection contracts. Five months after Patrick and Vanecko became owners, Municipal Sewer Services' city contract was extended by $3 million, (Note: equivalent to $5,250,543 in 2025) the first of two no-bid contract extensions, totaled an additional 23 months and $4 million. (Note: equivalent to $6,818,182 in 2025) Patrick and Vanecko cashed out their initial investment after about a year as the federal investigation into the Hired Truck program advanced. Patrick and Vanecko got a $13,114 "tax distribution" in December 2004. Patrick, then 29 and a recent University of Chicago MBA graduate, enlisted in the US Army. The day after the Mayor's son's and nephew's hidden involvement in the city contract was disclosed by the Chicago Sun-Times, Daley spoke at a Chicago police recruit graduation ceremony, then left for Fort Bragg, North Carolina to see his son deployed. Before departing, Mayor Daley read a statement to reporters, his voice cracking, fighting back tears,

I did not know about [Patrick's] involvement in this company. As an adult, he made that decision. It was a lapse in judgement for him to get involved with this company. I wish he hadn't done it. I know the expectations for elected officials, their families, are very high—rightfully so—especially for me. ... Patrick is a very good son. I love him. Maggie and I are very proud of him. I hope you respect I have nothing more to say on this.

Mayor Daley also said he didn't know if there were other city contracts involving the younger Daley. The city's Inspector General and federal authorities began investigations in December 2007. Patrick and Vanecko hired criminal defense attorneys. Municipal Sewer Services LLC folded in April 2008. In January 2011, Anthony Duffy, the president of Municipal Sewer Services, was charged with three counts of mail fraud in conjunction with minority-contracting and Jesse Brunt and his company, Brunt Brothers Transfer Inc., were indicted on three counts of mail fraud. Patrick and Vanecko were not charged.

In 2005, Concourse Communications, another Cardinal Growth venture, signed a city contract for airport Wi-Fi service at city-owned O'Hare and Midway airports. For years, the Daley administration maintained that Patrick had no financial stake in the deal. Concourse disclosed its investors to the city, as required, but Patrick was not reported. Patrick lined up investors for Concourse. On June 27, 2006, nine months after Concourse signed the contract, Concourse was sold at a 33% profit to Boingo Wireless Inc. for $45 million. (Note: equivalent to $69,038,896 in 2025) On June 30, 2006, Patrick received the first of five payments totaling $708,999. (Note: equivalent to $1,087,745 in 2025) On December 3, 2007, shortly after Patrick received the last of those payments, Mayor Daley's press secretary, Jacquelyn Heard said Patrick Daley "has no financial interest with the Wi-Fi contract at O'Hare." The Chicago Sun-Times editorialized, "... the conflict of interest was blatant."

==== Park Grill contracting scandal ====
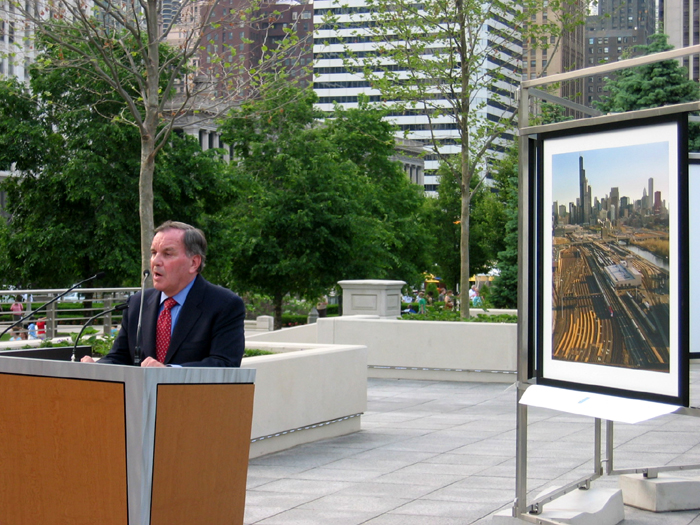
Chicago Mayor Richard M. Daley at the opening of the 2005 Revealing Chicago Exhibition in the Boeing Gallery and Chase Promenade in Millennium Park.

In 2003, an operating company included over 80 investors, including some of Mayor Daley's friends and neighbors won, under controversial circumstances, a lucrative contract to operate the Park Grill, the only restaurant in the new Millennium Park. In 2005 Daley criticized the deal, saying that the city wanted to renegotiate the pact. The Chicago Sun-Times dubbed the Park Grill the "Clout Cafe" and included the contract award process in a year-end review of 2005 Daley administration scandals. The contract was never renegotiated, and after Daley announced he would not seek a seventh term, the owners of the Park Grill sought to sell. Deposed in August 2013 in Mayor Rahm Emanuel's administration's lawsuit to renegotiate the contract, former Mayor Daley responded "I don't recall" 139 times.

==== Long-term leases of public infrastructure ====
In January 2006, Skyway Concession Company, a joint venture between the Australian Macquarie Infrastructure Group and Spanish Cintra Concesiones de Infraestructuras de Transporte S.A., paid the City $1.83 billion (Note: equivalent to $2.807581777×10^{9} in 2025) for rights to operate the Chicago Skyway and collect tolls for 99 years. The deal was the first of its kind in the U.S. In December 2006, Morgan Stanley paid Chicago $563 million (Note: equivalent to $863,753,301 in 2025) for a 99-year lease of the city's parking garages. "I'm the one who started talking about leasing public assets. No other city has done this in America," Daley recalled in 2009. Pulitzer Prize-winning commentator George F. Will wrote of the deals in The Washington Post,

Unfortunately, Daley's theory—that it can be better to get a sum X immediately, rather than getting over many years a sum Y that is substantially larger than X—assumes something that cannot be assumed. It assumes that governments will prudently husband sudden surges of revenue from the lease or sale of assets.

=== Sixth term (2007–2011) ===
May 24, 2008 City of Chicago Memorial Day observance

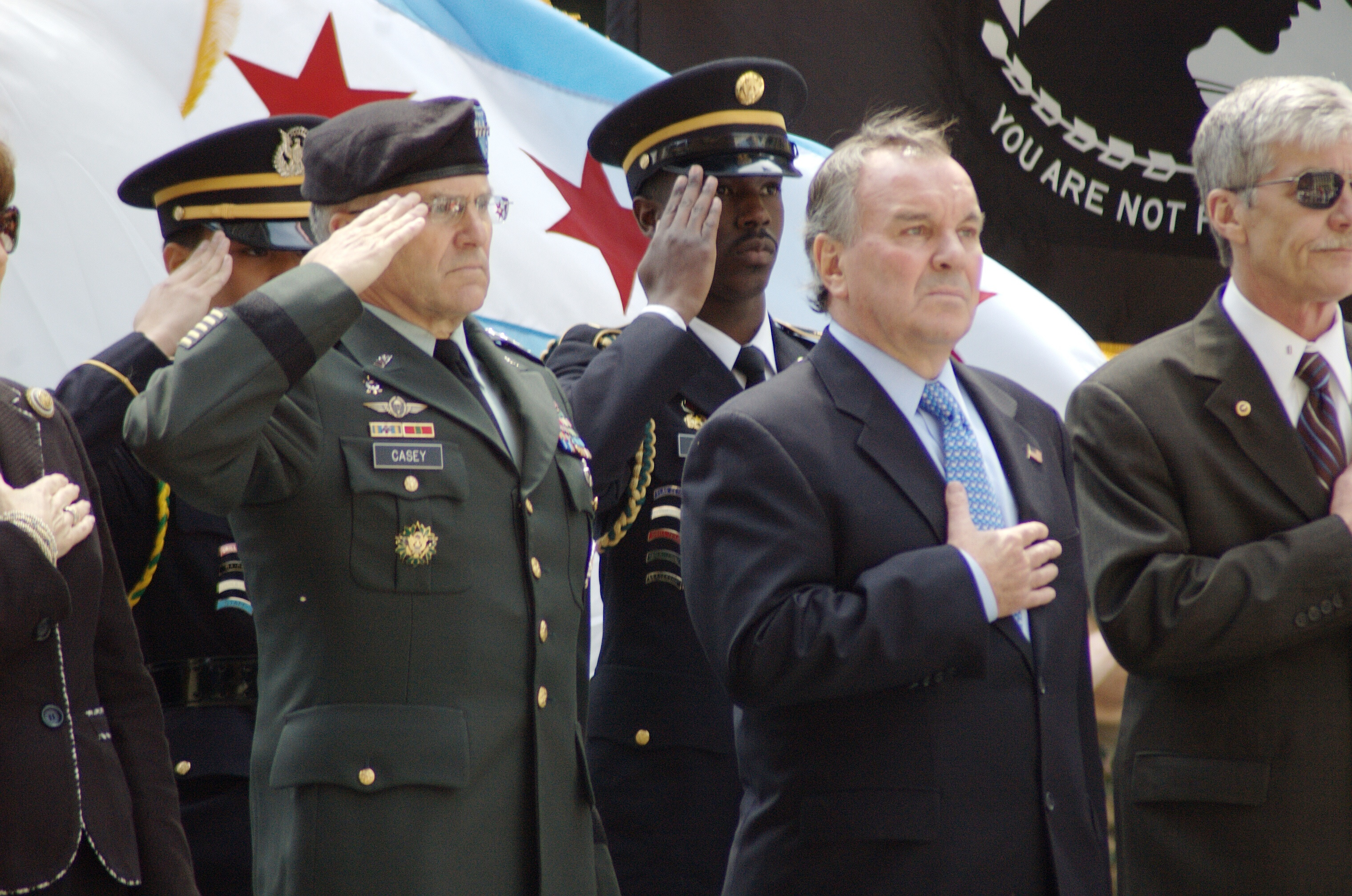
Chief of Staff of the United States Army Gen. George W. Casey, Jr. and Daley recite the Pledge of Allegiance during a wreath laying ceremony at

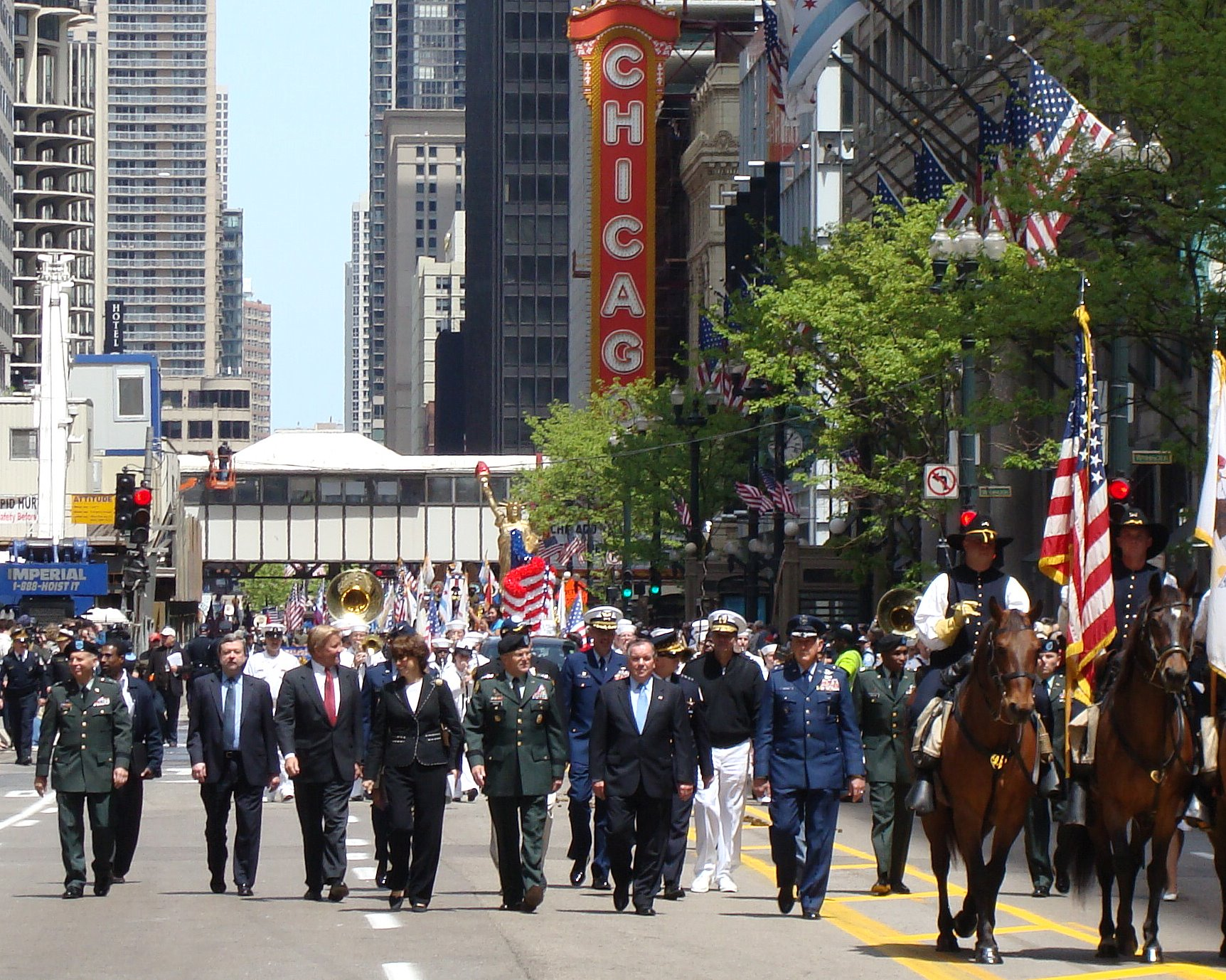
Casey, Daley, and other officials walk during the State Street parade.

On February 6, 2008, the Chicago City Council approved, by a 41–6 vote, an increase in the city's real estate transfer tax to fund the Chicago Transit Authority. Presiding over the meeting, Daley harshly chastized the dissenting aldermen. On March 15, 2010, Daley appointed two aldermen on the same day, bringing to 19 the number of alderman initially appointed by Daley.

==== More long-term leases of public infrastructure ====
In September 2008, Chicago accepted a $2.52 billion (Note: equivalent to $3.694357809×10^{9} in 2025) bid on a 99-year lease of Midway International Airport to a group of private investors, but the deal fell through due to the collapse of credit markets during the 2008 financial crisis. In 2008, as Chicago struggled to close a growing budget deficit, the city agreed to a 75-year, $1.16 billion (Note: equivalent to $1.700577404×10^{9} in 2025) deal to lease its parking meter system to an operating company created by Morgan Stanley. Daley said the "agreement is very good news for the taxpayers of Chicago because it will provide more than $1 billion in net proceeds that can be used during this very difficult economy." The agreement quadrupled rates, in the first year alone, while the hours which people have to pay for parking were broadened from 9 a.m. – 6 p.m. to 8 a.m. – 9 p.m., and from Monday through Saturday to every day of the week. Additionally, the city agreed to compensate the new owners for loss of revenue any time any road with parking meters is closed by the city for anything from maintenance work to street festivals. In three years, the proceeds from the lease were all but spent.

==== Failed Olympic bid ====
In 2007, Daley entered into ten-year contracts with the city's labor unions to preclude labor unrest as Chicago launched a bid to host the 2016 Summer Olympics. For months in 2009, Daley promoted the economic benefits of the proposal to the city and its corporate community. Many thought the games would be a capstone of Daley's career. On October 2, 2009, in a major disappointment for Daley, Chicago was the first of four finalists to be eliminated during selection ceremonies in Copenhagen. According to a March 2011 report from the city's Office of the Inspector General,

By signing a 10-year (contract) with the Teamsters (and with over 30 other unions representing city employees), the current administration and City Council unduly hamstrung not only the current management of city government, but the next six years of management as well, a period that extends well beyond the elected terms of the incoming administration and City Council.

==== Gun control ====
"If it was up to me, no one except law enforcement officers would own a handgun. But I understand that's impractical," Daley told attendees at a conference of gun control advocates in Washington, D.C. in 1998, during his third term. Daley was a member of the Mayors Against Illegal Guns Coalition, an organization formed in 2006 and co-chaired by New York City Mayor Michael Bloomberg and Boston Mayor Thomas Menino. On January 17, 2006, during Daley's fifth term, at a joint press conference with Illinois Governor Rod Blagojevich calling for a statewide ban on semi-automatic assault weapons, Daley said, "If we are really to make the progress that we want, we have to keep the most dangerous weapons that are right here off of our streets."

The US Supreme Court took up McDonald v. Chicago, 561 U.S. 3025, 130 S.Ct. 3020 (2010), which challenged handgun bans in the Chicago and in the neighboring suburb of Oak Park. In May 2010, Daley held a press conference to address gun control and a pending possible adverse decision in McDonald v. Chicago. After Mick Dumke, a reporter for the Chicago Reader, questioned the effectiveness of the city's handgun ban, Daley picked up a rifle with a bayonet from a display table of confiscated weapons and told him, "If I put this up your butt, you'll find out how effective it is. Let me put a round up your, you know." (Note: See also) The remark was voted "the stoopidest thing that Mayor Richard Daley the Younger has ever said" in an online poll by the Chicago Tribune.

On June 28, 2010, the US Supreme Court held, in a 5–4 decision in McDonald v. Chicago, that the Second Amendment to the United States Constitution was incorporated under the Fourteenth Amendment, thus protecting the right of an individual to "keep and bear arms" from local governments, and all but declared Mayor Jane Byrne's 1982 handgun ban unconstitutional. That afternoon, at a press conference concerning the gun ban, Daley said,

We'll publicly propose a new ordinance very soon ... As a city we must continue to stand up ... and fight for a ban on assault weapons ... as well as a crackdown on gun shops ... We are a country of laws not a nation of guns.

Daley called a special meeting of the city council for four days later, and the Council approved a gun control ordinance revised to include city firearms licenses.

==== Daley budget deficits and fund draw-downs ====
Daley came into office in a city with revenue-generating assets, manageable debt and flush pension funds, but he left behind a city with a structural deficit that Mayor-elect Rahm Emanuel estimated at $1.2 billion (Note: equivalent to $1.691910800×10^{9} in 2025) when under-funded pension funds were included. The Daley administration's expenditures exceeded revenues by hundreds of millions of dollars a year. In August 2010, Fitch Ratings downgraded the city's bond credit rating, citing the administration's use of reserve funds for general operating expenses and under-funding of its pension funds, and noted that the city faced rising fixed operating costs yet lacked plans for new revenue. Wall Street analysts noted that the Daley administration began drawing on the city's reserves as early as 2006, before the Great Recession. "While there had been sound economic growth in years prior to 2008, there were still sizable fund balance drawdowns in both 2006 and 2007," Fitch wrote. The city's budgets continued to increase even after the recession began, to more than $6 billion (Note: equivalent to $8.796090020×10^{9} in 2025) a year, and, when under-funded city employee pension funds were included, the city's annual deficit exceeded $1 billion. In January 2011, Moody's Investors Service downgraded to a "negative" outlook some of the revenue bonds issued for the $15 billion (Note: equivalent to $2.1148885002×10^{10} in 2025) O'Hare Modernization Program and related infrastructure projects, citing the city's plan to postpone repayment of interest and principal on some construction bonds.

In his annual budget address in City Council Chambers on October 15, 2008, Daley proposed a 2009 budget totaling $5.97 billion, (Note: equivalent to $8.752109570×10^{9} in 2025) including not filling 1,350 vacancies on the 38,000 employee city payroll and $150 million (Note: equivalent to $219,902,251 in 2025) in new revenue from a then-obscure parking meter lease deal to help erase a $469 million (Note: equivalent to $687,561,037 in 2025) budget shortfall. The Daley administration employed an in-house staff of more than 50 public relations officers across City departments at a cost of $4.7 million, (Note: equivalent to $6,890,271 in 2025) and millions more on seven private public relations firms. "It's worth it", Daley said. On the first day of City Council hearings on Daley's 2009 budget proposal, several aldermen questioned the administration's public relations spending. On November 4, 2008, Jacquelyn Heard, the mayor's press secretary, said the city would halt spending on 10 public relations contracts that could have paid as much as $5 million (Note: equivalent to $7,476,816 in 2025) each.

In his annual budget address on October 21, 2009, Daley projected a deficit for 2009 of more than $520 million. (Note: equivalent to $757,335,140 in 2025) Daley proposed a 2010 budget totaling $6.14 billion, (Note: equivalent to $8.835626464×10^{9} in 2025) including spending $370 million (Note: equivalent to $532,440,031 in 2025) from the $1.15 billion (Note: equivalent to $1.654881178×10^{9} in 2025) proceeds from the parking meter lease. In his annual budget address on October 13, 2010, Daley projected a deficit for 2010 of $655 million, (Note: equivalent to $942,562,758 in 2025) the largest in city history. Daley proposed a 2011 budget totaling $6.15 billion, (Note: equivalent to $8.671042851×10^{9} in 2025) including spending all but $76 million (Note: equivalent to $107,154,351 in 2025) of what remained of the parking meter lease proceeds, and received a standing ovation from aldermen.

==== Daley declines to run for seventh term ====
Daley's approval rating was at an all-time low of 35% by late 2009. On September 7, 2010, Daley announced that he would not seek a seventh term. "I've always believed that every person, especially public officials, must understand when it's time to move on. For me, that time is now," Daley said. On December 26, 2010, Daley surpassed his father as Chicago's longest-serving mayor. Daley chaired his final city council meeting on Wednesday morning, May 11, 2011. His term ended on May 16, 2011, and he was succeeded by Rahm Emanuel.

=== Approval ratings ===
View source data.

| Segment polled | Polling source | Date | Approve | Disapprove | Sample size | Margin-of-error | Polling method | Citation |
|---|---|---|---|---|---|---|---|---|
| Registered voters | Market Shares Corp. (commissioned by Chicago Tribune/WGN-TV) | August 27–31, 2009 | 35% | 47% | 300 | ±5 | | |
| | Chicago Tribune | July 2009 | 37% | 47% | | | | |
| | Bennett, Petts, & Normington (commissioned by SEIU Illinois State Council) | March 23–25, 2009 | 50% | | | ±4.3 | Telephone | |
| | | 2007 | 41% | | | | | |
| Registered voters | Market Shares Corp. (commissioned by Chicago Tribune/WGN-TV) | February 10–13, 2006 | 56% | 33% | 700 | ±4 | | |
| | Chicago Tribune | November 2005 | 61% | | | | | |
| Registered voters | Market Shares Corp. (commissioned by Chicago Tribune/WGN-TV) | May 16–18, 2005 | 53% | 33% | 700 | ±4 | | |
| Registered voters | Market Shares Corp. (commissioned by Chicago Tribune/WGN-TV) | January 31–February 3, 2003 | 72% | 16% | 700 | ±4 | Telephone | |
| | | 1999 | 79% | | | | | |
| Registered voters | Market Shares Corp Commissioned by Chicago Tribune | May 13–18, 1993 | 66% | 29% | 399 | ±3 | Telephone | |
| Likely voters | Market Shares Corp. and Chicago Tribune | February 9–11, 1991 | 75% | 20% | 600 | ±4 | Telephone | |
| Likely voters | Market Shares Corp. and Chicago Tribune | January 11–14, 1991 | 80% | 16% | 600 | ±4 | Telephone | |
| | Southtown Economist | December 1990 | 61% | | | | | |
| | Chicago Sun-Times | November 1990 | 58% | | | | | |
| Adults | Market Shares Corp. and Chicago Tribune | October 24–25, 1989 | 68% | 14% | 500 | ±4 | Telephone | |

=== Legacy ===
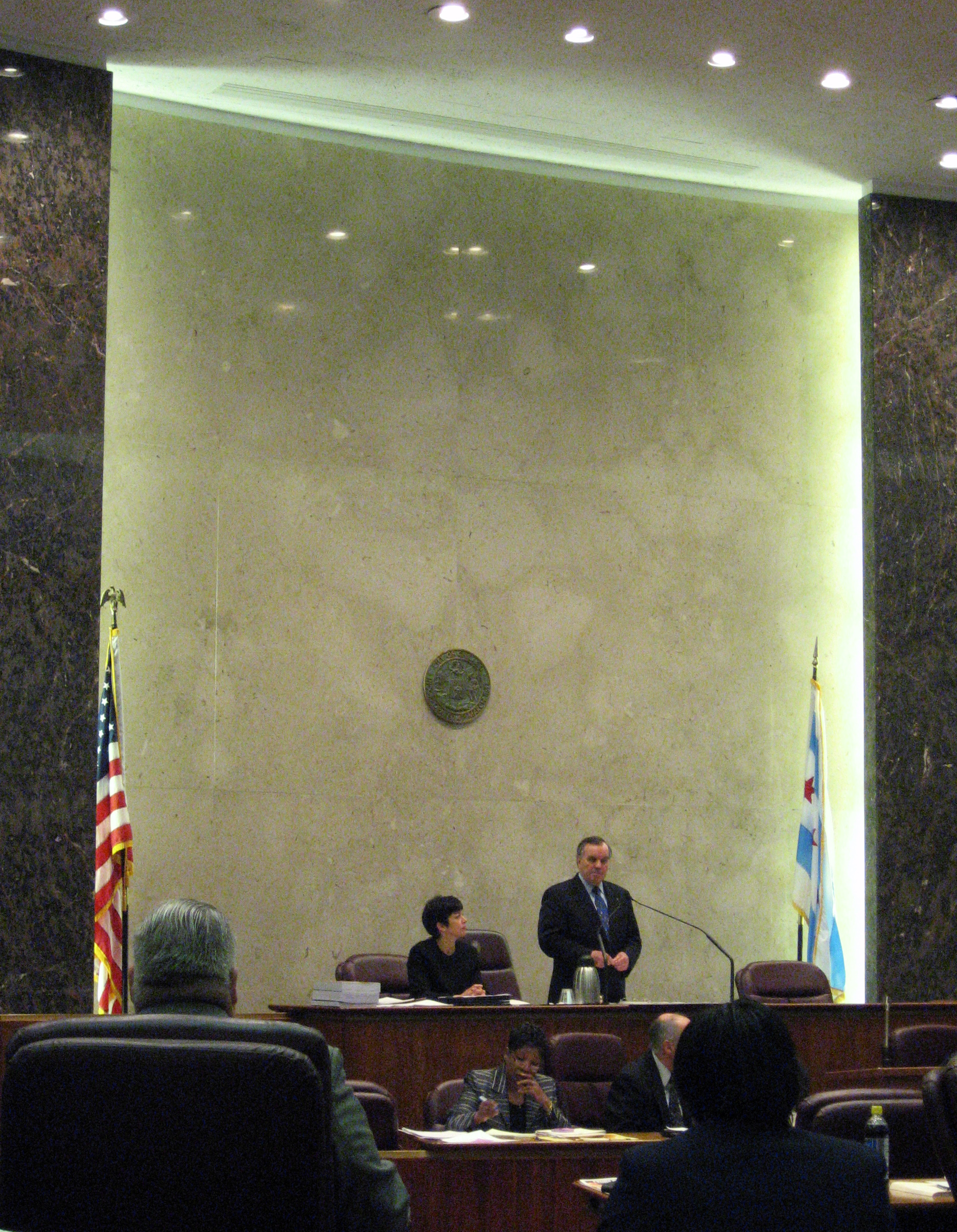
Daley in Chicago City Hall

Daley was supported by Chicago's traditionally Republican business community. He came under criticism for focusing city resources on the development of businesses downtown, the North, Near South, and Near West Sides, while neglecting neighborhoods in the other areas of the city; in particular the needs of low-income residents. According to Chicago Tribune columnist Steve Chapman, "Daley lasted 22 years in office partly because he resolved to ingratiate himself with black Chicagoans. He appointed blacks to high positions, stressed his commitment to provide services to all neighborhoods, tore down public housing projects, and pushed reform of the minority-dominated public schools." Daley focused on Chicago as a tourist destination as opposed to a manufacturing base, improved and expanded parkland, added flower planters along many primary streets, and oversaw the creation of Millennium Park on what had previously been an abandoned train yard. He spearheaded the conversion of Navy Pier into a popular tourist destination. Daley supported immigration reform, and green building initiatives, for which he was presented with an Honor Award from the National Building Museum in 2009 as a "visionary in sustainability." Chicago avoided some of the most severe economic contractions of other Midwest cities along the Great Lakes such as Detroit and Cleveland.

Contrary to popular belief, Daley's relationship with highly influential Illinois Speaker of the House Michael Madigan was actually more tense in private.

== Post-mayoral career ==
Days after leaving office, the University of Chicago appointed Daley a "distinguished senior fellow" at the Harris School of Public Policy. The five-year, part-time appointment includes responsibility for coordinating a guest lecture series. Weeks after leaving office, Daley joined the international law firm Katten Muchin Rosenman LLP, one of the law firms to which he had awarded no-bid legal work as mayor. Katten Muchin Rosenman LLP had negotiated the city's much-criticized long-term lease of its parking meters, parking garages, and the Chicago Skyway. Daley joined an exclusive speakers bureau, the Harry Walker Agency, that pays tens of thousands of dollars an appearance. Daley was on the board of directors of The Coca-Cola Company from 2011 to 2019. Daley is a managing principal of Tur Partners LLC, an investment firm, where Daley's son, Patrick Daley, is a principal. The National Law Journal included Daley in its 2013 list of "The 100 Most Influential Lawyers in America," based on "his political connections — the best in Chicago." In 2022, Daley's daughter Nora became chair of the Illinois Arts Council.

In June 2022, Daley was hospitalized at Northwestern Memorial Hospital in Chicago for a "neurological" illness.

== Recognition ==
In 1999, Daley received the Arbor Day Foundation's Lifetime Stewardship Award.

In 2002, Daley received the Golden Plate Award of the American Academy of Achievement presented by Awards Council member and Pulitzer Prize-winning author Frank McCourt. He was the Host of the 2004 International Achievement Summit in Chicago.

In 2017, Daley received the ULI Chicago Lifetime Achievement Award.

== Publications ==
- Daley, Richard M. (February 13, 2013). "US Must Side with Its Young Not Its Guns". Financial Times. Archived from the original on December 10, 2022.

== See also ==
- Electoral history of Richard M. Daley
- Timeline of Chicago, 1980s–2010s

== Footnotes ==
Political offices
| Preceded by Bernard Carey | Cook County State's Attorney; 1980–1989 | Succeeded by Cecil Partee |
| Preceded by Eugene Sawyer | Mayor of Chicago; April 24, 1989 – May 16, 2011 | Succeeded by Rahm Emanuel |
