= Eleanor "Sis" Daley =

Chicago first lady of mayor Richard J. Daley (1907–2003)

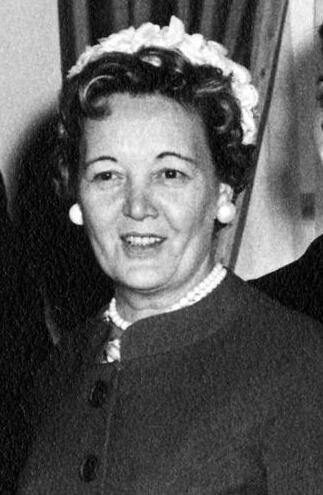
- Daley in 1961

First Lady of Chicago
- In office April 20, 1955 – December 20, 1976
- Preceded by: Margaret E. Kirk (1947)
- Succeeded by: Heather Morgan

Personal details
- Born: Eleanor Guilfoyle; March 4, 1907 Chicago, Illinois, U.S.
- Died: February 16, 2003 (aged 95) Chicago, Illinois, U.S.
- Resting place: Holy Sepulchre Cemetery (Alsip, Illinois)
- Spouse: Richard J. Daley (m. 1936; died 1976)
- Children: 7, including Richard, John, and William
- Relatives: Patrick R. Daley (grandson)
- Nicknames: Sis Daley; Lady Daley

Eleanor Daley (née Guilfoyle; March 4, 1907 – February 16, 2003), better known as Sis Daley, was the wife of former Chicago mayor Richard J. Daley and the mother of former mayor Richard M. Daley. Daley served as first lady of the City of Chicago from her husband's appointing in April 1955 until his death in December 1976, and first mother from April 1989 until her death in February 2003.

== Biography ==
=== Early life and family ===
Daley was born Eleanor Guilfoyle in 1907, in the south side Chicago neighborhood of Canaryville, to a large Irish family. She was the daughter of Honora Bridget "Nora" (McAuliffe) and Patrick H. Guilfoyle, an insurance agent. She met Richard J. Daley at a local ball game. Her brother, Lloyd, who was a friend of Daley's, introduced the couple. Their first date was attending a Chicago White Sox game. Daley was a graduate of Saint Mary High School and a secretary at a local paint company. After a six-year-long courtship, during which her future husband finished law school, they married on June 17, 1936. The Daleys lived in a modest brick bungalow at 3536 South Lowe Street, close to where both had grown up. They had three daughters and four sons, in that order. Their eldest son, Richard M. Daley, was mayor of Chicago from 1989 through 2011. The youngest son, William M. Daley, served as U.S. secretary of commerce from 1997-2000 and the White House chief of staff from 2011–2012. Another son, John P. Daley, is a member of the Cook County Board of Commissioners.

=== Personality ===
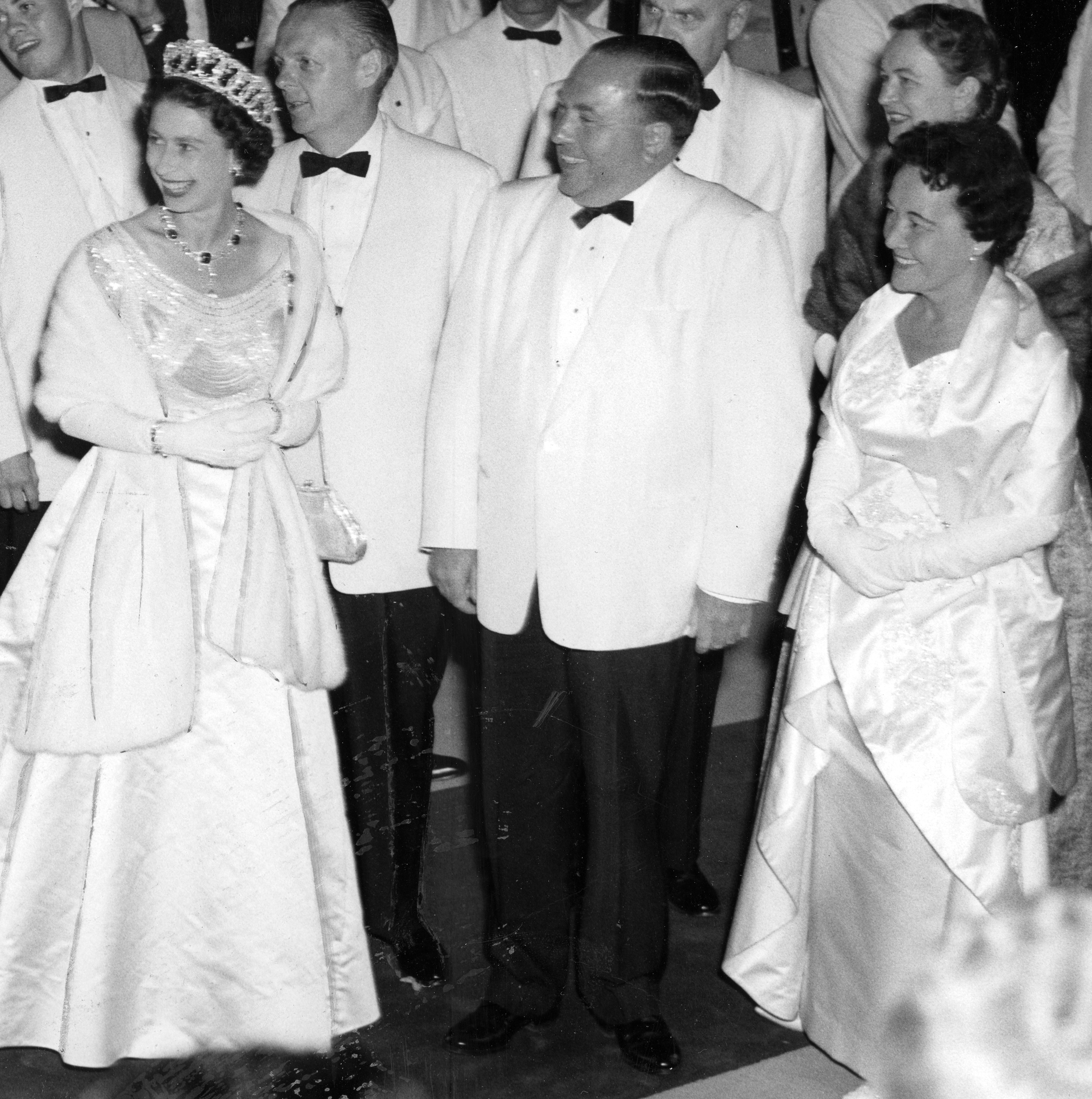
Daley and her husband (right, front) with Elizabeth II (left) during the British monarch's 1959 visit to Chicago

Daley was a quiet woman who seldom spoke out on political matters. One exception was her criticism of Boss, the 1971 Mike Royko biography of Mayor Daley, which portrayed the mayor in an unfavorable light. Always fiercely protective of her husband and family, she uttered sharp criticism of the book, and this led to one local retailer leaving the book off its shelves.

In 1972, developers had obtained the city's tentative approval of a proposal to tear down the old Chicago Public Library downtown and replace it with a modern office tower. Asked her view of the proposal by a Chicago Tribune reporter, Sis Daley observed that she had used the library as a child and said of the demolition, "I don't think that would be nice." Soon thereafter, a city commission unanimously voted down the project.

Of Sis, the mayor told the press: "She doesn't speak for me and I don't speak for her. She is able to speak for herself very well, whatever she has on her mind." It was said that although her husband might have controlled every aspect of the city's government, she controlled everything inside their house.

== Later years and death ==
Daley's grave at Holy Sepulchre Cemetery

In her later years as a widow, and especially during her son's tenure as mayor, she became something of a matriarch of Chicago; in fact, her birthday of March 4 happens to also be the anniversary of the incorporation of the city. She attended events to honor her late husband at the University of Illinois at Chicago, including the dedication of the university library named after him in 1999 and on the centenary of his birth in 2002. Mrs. Daley died on February 16, 2003, in her Bridgeport home of a stroke 16 days shy of her 96th birthday while her son was running for a fifth term as mayor in the 2003 Chicago mayoral election. She was buried at Holy Sepulchre Cemetery in Alsip.
