= Illinois's 3rd House of Representatives district =

American legislative district

Illinois's 3rd State House of Representatives district
Representative
Eva-Dina Delgado; D–Chicago
since 2019
- Demographics: 21.8% White; 4.4% Black; 69.2% Hispanic; 2.8% Asian; 0.1% Native American; 0.0% Hawaiian/Pacific Islander; 0.5% Other; 1.3% Multiracial
- Population (2020): 108,018
- Created: 1983–present 1849–1873, 1957–1973

Illinois's 3rd House of Representatives district is a Representative district within the Illinois House of Representatives located in Cook County, Illinois. It has been represented by Democrat Eva-Dina Delgado since November 15, 2019. The district was previously represented by Democrat Luis Arroyo from 2007 to 2019.

The district covers parts of Chicago and of Chicago's neighborhoods, it covers all or parts of Belmont Cragin, Dunning, Hermosa, Humboldt Park, Logan Square, Montclare, Portage Park, and West Town.

== Representative district history ==
Prior to the ratification of the 1848 Illinois Constitution, counties (or two or more counties) were designated a certain number of Senators and Representatives. With the ratification of the 1848 Illinois Constitution, Legislative and Representative districts were numbered and called by name. Each district was still assigned a certain number of Senators and Representatives. After the passage of the 1872 Apportionment, only Legislative districts were drawn with Representatives elected cumulatively. The 1954 amendment to the 1870 Illinois Constitution established Representative districts as separate from Legislative districts (with representatives still elected cumulatively). The boundaries of Representative and Legislative districts would differ. After the United States Supreme Court ruled in Reynolds v. Sims (1964) that "both houses of state legislatures must be apportioned according to districts of equal population," new districts were redrawn for the Illinois Senate and Illinois House of Representatives. While the Legislative districts were redrawn, the Governor and General Assembly failed to agree on Representative district boundaries. Under the 1954 amendment, "a 10-man bipartisan commission appointed by the governor from recommendations made by both parties" were directed to redraw boundaries but failed to do so in 1963. Because of this failure, and with no district boundaries redrawn, all Representative districts were temporarily merged into one at-large district with 177 representatives (the total number of representatives at the time). The 1964 Illinois House election had several candidates running for all 177 seats throughout the state. In 1965, the Representative districts were redrawn by the Illinois Legislative Reapportionment Commission and elections held in 1966 were done with separate districts. With the 1971 Apportionment (and adoption of the 1970 Illinois Constitution), Representative districts were abolished and representatives were once again elected cumulatively per Legislative district. After the passage of the Cutback Amendment in 1980, the number of Representatives was reduced from 177 to 118 with Representative districts re-established and now electing a single representative.

== Prominent representatives ==
Representative	Notes
William J. Allen	Elected to the U.S. House of Representatives from Illinois's 9th congressional district (1862 – 1863); Elected back to the U.S. House of Representatives from Illinois's 13th congressional district (1863 – 1865); Served as a judge in the United States District Court for the Southern District of Illinois (1887 – 1901)

== List of representatives ==
=== 1849 – 1873 ===
Representative	Party	Years (Note: From 1870 to 1970, the GA met for a new session on the Wednesday after the first Monday of January.)	General Assembly (GA)	Electoral history	Counties represented
3rd Representative district established with 1848 Illinois Constitution.
Curtis Blakeman Jr.	Democratic	January 1, 1849 – January 6, 1851	16th	Elected in 1848; Was not re-elected in 1850	Gallatin; Saline
A. C. Caldwell	Unknown	January 6, 1851 – ???	17th	Elected in 1850; Passed away during the 17th GA	Gallatin; Saline
Vacant		??? – ???	17th		Gallatin; Saline
Orville Sexton	Democratic	??? – January 3, 1853	17th	Appointed to fill the remainder of Caldwell's term Was not elected in 1852	Gallatin; Saline
David B. Russell	Democratic	January 3, 1853 – January 1, 1855	18th	Elected in 1852; Was not re-elected in 1854	Gallatin; Saline
William J. Allen	Democratic	January 1, 1855 – January 5, 1857	19th	Elected in 1854; Was not re-elected in 1856	Johnson; Williamson
Thomas Jones	Unknown	January 5, 1857 – January 3, 1859	20th	Elected in 1856; Was not re-elected in 1858	Johnson; Williamson
James D. Pulley	Democratic	January 3, 1859 – January 5, 1863	21st 22nd	Elected in 1858; Re-elected in 1860; Redistricted out and retired in 1862	Johnson; Williamson
James B. Turner	Unknown	January 5, 1863 – January 2, 1865	23rd	Elected in 1862; Was not re-elected in 1864	Gallatin; Hardin; Saline
Charles Burnett	Democratic	January 2, 1865 – January 7, 1867	24th	Elected in 1864; Was not re-elected in 1866	Gallatin; Hardin; Saline
James Macklin	Unknown	January 7, 1867 – January 4, 1869	25th	Elected in 1866; Was not re-elected in 1868	Gallatin; Hardin; Saline
Charles Burnett	Democratic	January 4, 1869 – January 4, 1871	26th	Elected back in 1868; Redistricted out and retired in 1870	Gallatin; Hardin; Saline
George W. Waters	Republican	January 4, 1871 – January 8, 1873	27th	Elected in 1870; Was not re-elected in 1872	Pope
District abolished with 1872 Reapportionment as 3 Representatives were now elected cumulatively from Legislative districts.

=== 1957 – 1973 ===
Representative	Party	Party Control	Years (Note: Since 1970, the GA meets on the second Wednesday of January for a new session.)	General Assembly (GA)	Electoral history	Counties represented
District re-established in 1957.
George E. Dolezal	Republican	2 Republicans; 1 Democrat	January 9, 1957 – January 6, 1965	70th 71st 72nd 73rd	Elected in 1956; Re-elected in 1958; Re-elected in 1960; Re-elected in 1962; Did not run in At-large election	Cook
Frank A. Marek	Republican	2 Republicans; 1 Democrat	January 9, 1957 – January 6, 1965	70th 71st 72nd 73rd	Redistricted from 19th Legislative district and re-elected in 1956; Re-elected in 1958; Re-elected in 1960; Re-elected in 1962; Did not run in At-large election	Cook
Paul G. Ceaser	Democratic	2 Republicans; 1 Democrat	January 9, 1957 – January 6, 1965	70th 71st 72nd 73rd	Elected in 1956; Re-elected in 1958; Re-elected in 1960; Re-elected in 1962; Did not run in At-large election	Cook
The district was temporarily abolished from 1965 to 1967 due to the Redistricting Commission in 1963 failing to reach an agreement. An at-large election was held electing 177 Representatives from across the state.
Eugene Schlickman	Republican	2 Republicans; 1 Democrat	January 4, 1967 – January 10, 1973	75th 76th 77th	Redistricted from At-large district and re-elected in 1966; Re-elected in 1968; Re-elected in 1970; Redistricted to 4th Legislative district and re-elected in 1972	Cook
David J. Regner	Republican	2 Republicans; 1 Democrat	January 4, 1967 – January 10, 1973	75th 76th 77th	Elected in 1966; Re-elected in 1968; Re-elected in 1970; Ran for Illinois Senate in the 3rd Legislative district and won in 1972	Cook
Eugenia S. Chapman	Democratic	2 Republicans; 1 Democrat	January 4, 1967 – January 10, 1973	75th 76th 77th	Redistricted from At-large district and re-elected in 1966; Re-elected in 1968; Re-elected in 1970; Redistricted to 3rd Legislative district and re-elected in 1972	Cook
District abolished with 1971 Reapportionment as Representatives were once again elected from Legislative districts.

=== 1983 – Present ===
Representative	Party	Years	General Assembly (GA)	Electoral history	Counties represented
District re-established with representatives now elected one per district with the passage of the Cutback Amendment
Lee Preston	Democratic	January 12, 1983 – January 13, 1993	83rd 84th 85th 86th 87th	Redistricted from the 11th Legislative district and won re-election in 1982; Re-elected in 1984; Re-elected in 1986; Re-elected in 1988; Re-elected in 1990; Redistricted to the 17th Representative district and lost renomination.	Cook
Miguel A. Santiago	Democratic	January 13, 1993 – January 29, 1998	88th 89th	Redistricted from the 9th district and re-elected in 1992; Re-elected in 1994; Re-elected in 1996; Resigned in 1998	Cook
Miguel A. Santiago	Democratic	January 13, 1993 – January 29, 1998	90th	Redistricted from the 9th district and re-elected in 1992; Re-elected in 1994; Re-elected in 1996; Resigned in 1998	Cook
Vacant		January 29, 1998 – ???	90th		Cook
Elba Iris Rodriguez	Democratic	??? – January 13, 1999	90th	Appointed in 1998; Lost nomination in 1998	Cook
William Delgado	Democratic	January 13, 1999 – December 2006	91st 92nd 93rd	Elected in 1998; Re-elected in 2000; Re-elected in 2002; Re-elected in 2004; Ran for Illinois Senate in the 2nd Legislative district and was appointed after winning in 2006.	Cook
William Delgado	Democratic	January 13, 1999 – December 2006	94th	Elected in 1998; Re-elected in 2000; Re-elected in 2002; Re-elected in 2004; Ran for Illinois Senate in the 2nd Legislative district and was appointed after winning in 2006.	Cook
Vacant		December 2006	94th		Cook
Luis Arroyo	Democratic	December 2006 – November 1, 2019	94th	Appointed in 2006; Elected in 2008; Re-elected in 2010; Re-elected in 2012; Re-elected in 2014; Re-elected in 2016; Re-elected in 2018; Resigned in 2019.	Cook
Luis Arroyo	Democratic	December 2006 – November 1, 2019	95th 96th 97th 98th 99th 100th	Appointed in 2006; Elected in 2008; Re-elected in 2010; Re-elected in 2012; Re-elected in 2014; Re-elected in 2016; Re-elected in 2018; Resigned in 2019.	Cook
Luis Arroyo	Democratic	December 2006 – November 1, 2019	101st	Appointed in 2006; Elected in 2008; Re-elected in 2010; Re-elected in 2012; Re-elected in 2014; Re-elected in 2016; Re-elected in 2018; Resigned in 2019.	Cook
Vacant		November 1, 2019 – November 15, 2019	101st		Cook
Eva-Dina Delgado	Democratic	November 15, 2019 – Present	101st	Appointed in 2019; Elected in 2020; Re-elected in 2022	Cook
Eva-Dina Delgado	Democratic	November 15, 2019 – Present	102nd 103rd	Appointed in 2019; Elected in 2020; Re-elected in 2022	Cook

== Historic District Boundaries ==
Years	County	Municipalities/Townships	Notes
2023 – present	Cook	Chicago (Belmont Cragin, Dunning, Hermosa, Humboldt Park, Logan Square, Montclare, Portage Park, West Town)	
2013 – 2023	Cook	Chicago (Austin, Belmont Cragin, Dunning, Hermosa, Logan Square, Montclare, and Portage Park), Elmwood Park	
2003 – 2013	Cook	Chicago	
1993 – 2003	Cook	Chicago	
1983 – 1993	Cook	Chicago	
1967 – 1973	Cook	Barrington Township, Elk Grove Township, Hanover Township, parts of Maine Township, parts of Northfield Township, Palatine Township, Shaumberg Township, Wheeling Township	
1957 – 1965	Cook	Berywn Township, Cicero Township, parts of Stickney Township	
1871 – 1873	Pope	Allens Spring, Bay City, Book, Columbus, Eddyville, Glendale, Golconda, Hamletsburg, Lusk, Morgantown, New Liberty, Oak, Rock, Rock Quarry, Wool, Zion Hill	
1863 – 1871	Hardin; Gallatin; Saline	America, Bankton, Bowlesville, Cane Creek, Cave-In-Rock, Cornersville, Curran, Cypressville, Denane, Eagle Creek, Equality, Eldorado, Elizabethtown, Frankfort, Galatia, Harrisburg, Indian Creek, Marthas, Mitchellsville, Mt. Airy, New Haven, New Mark, Raleigh, Rock and Cave, Rosiclare, Saline Hills, Salineville, Shawneetown (Old Shawneetown), Somerset, Stonefort, Twitchell's Mill	
1855 – 1863	Johnson; Williamson	Bainbridge, Bolton, Crab Orchard, Fredonia, Jeffersonville, Locust Grove, Marion, Reynoldsburg, Sarahville, Sulphur Spa, Vienna,	
1849 – 1855	Gallatin; Saline	Bankton, Cane Creek, Cornersville, Curran, Cypressville, Denane, Eagle Creek, Equality, Griswold, Indian Creek, Mt. Airy, New Haven, Shawneetown (Old Shawneetown), Raleigh	

== Electoral history ==
=== 2030 – 2022 ===
2022 Illinois House of Representatives election
Party	Candidate	Votes	%	±%
Democratic	Eva-Dina Delgado (incumbent)	19,056	81.95	−18.05%
Republican	Jonathan Serrano	4196	18.05	N/A
Total votes		23,252	100.0	

=== 2020 – 2012 ===
2020 Illinois House of Representatives election
Party	Candidate	Votes	%	±%
Democratic	Eva-Dina Delgado (incumbent)	25,453	100.0	N/A
Total votes		25,453	100.0	

2018 Illinois House of Representatives election
Party	Candidate	Votes	%	±%
Democratic	Luis Arroyo (incumbent)	19,782	100.0	N/A
Total votes		19,782	100.0	

2016 Illinois House of Representatives election
Party	Candidate	Votes	%	±%
Democratic	Luis Arroyo (incumbent)	24,178	100.0	N/A
Total votes		24,178	100.0	

2014 Illinois House of Representatives election
Party	Candidate	Votes	%	±%
Democratic	Luis Arroyo (incumbent)	11,948	100.0	N/A
Total votes		11,948	100.0	

2012 Illinois House of Representatives election
Party	Candidate	Votes	%	±%
Democratic	Luis Arroyo (incumbent)	19,636	100.0	N/A
Total votes		19,636	100.0	

=== 2010 – 2002 ===
2010 Illinois House of Representatives election
Party	Candidate	Votes	%	±%
Democratic	Luis Arroyo (incumbent)	9,363	100.0	N/A
Total votes		9,363	100.0	

2008 Illinois House of Representatives election
Party	Candidate	Votes	%	±%
Democratic	Luis Arroyo (incumbent)	16,881	100.0	N/A
Total votes		16,881	100.0	

2006 Illinois House of Representatives election
Party	Candidate	Votes	%	±%
Democratic	William "Willie" Delgado (incumbent)	11,328	100.0	N/A
Total votes		11,328	100.0	

2004 Illinois House of Representatives election
Party	Candidate	Votes	%	±%
Democratic	William "Willie" Delgado (incumbent)	15,831	100.0	N/A
Total votes		15,831	100.0	

2002 Illinois House of Representatives election
Party	Candidate	Votes	%	±%
Democratic	William Delgado (incumbent)	11,753	100.0	N/A
Total votes		11,753	100.0	

=== 2000 – 1992 ===
2000 Illinois House of Representatives election
Party	Candidate	Votes	%	±%
Democratic	William "Willie" Delgado (incumbent)	15,178	100.0	N/A
Total votes		15,178	100.0	

1998 Illinois House of Representatives election
Party	Candidate	Votes	%	±%
Democratic	William "Willie" Delgado	9,314	100.0	+9.90%
Total votes		9,314	100.0	

1998 Illinois House of Representatives Democratic primary
Party	Candidate	Votes	%
Democratic	William "Willie" Delgado	2,982	52.13
Democratic	Elba Iris Rodriguez (incumbent)	2,738	47.87
Total votes		5,720	100.0

1996 Illinois House of Representatives election
Party	Candidate	Votes	%	±%
Democratic	Miguel A. Santiago (incumbent)	14,513	90.10	−9.90%
Republican	Augusto Montijo	1594	9.90	N/A
Total votes		16,107	100.0	

1994 Illinois House of Representatives election
Party	Candidate	Votes	%	±%
Democratic	Miguel A. Santiago (incumbent)	7,491	100.0	N/A
Total votes		7,491	100.0	

1992 Illinois House of Representatives election
Party	Candidate	Votes	%	±%
Democratic	Miguel A. Santiago (incumbent)	16,042	100.0	+21.36%
Total votes		16,042	100.0	

=== 1990 – 1982 ===
1990 Illinois House of Representatives election
Party	Candidate	Votes	%	±%
Democratic	Lee Preston (incumbent)	16,333	78.64	+1.74%
Republican	Harry T. Santiago	3,610	17.38	−5.71%
Libertarian	Glenn Olofson	824	3.96	N/A
Total votes		20,767	100.0	

1988 Illinois House of Representatives election
Party	Candidate	Votes	%	±%
Democratic	Lee Preston (incumbent)	24,648	76.90	−2.50%
Republican	Jerry Ex	7,404	23.09	+2.50%
Total votes		32,052	100.0	

1986 Illinois House of Representatives election
Party	Candidate	Votes	%	±%
Democratic	Lee Preston (incumbent)	18,653	79.40	−20.59%
Republican	Jerry Ex	4,839	20.59	N/A
Total votes		23,492	100.0	

1984 Illinois House of Representatives election
Party	Candidate	Votes	%	±%
Democratic	Lee Preston (incumbent)	24,068	99.99	+21.93%
Write-in		3	0.01	-0.02%
Total votes		24,071	100.0	

1982 Illinois House of Representatives election
Party	Candidate	Votes	%
Democratic	Lee Preston (incumbent)	23,518	78.06
Republican	Charles O. Nelson	6,603	21.92
Write-in		9	0.03
Total votes		30,130	100.0

=== 1970 – 1962 ===
1970 Illinois House of Representatives election
Party	Candidate	Votes	%
Republican	David J. Regner (incumbent)	104,265	32.01
Republican	Eugene F. Schlickman (incumbent)	102,089	31.35
Democratic	Eugenia S. Chapman (incumbent)	78,780	24.19
Democratic	Gerald J. Mannix	40,482.5	12.43
Write-in		69	0.02
Total votes		325,685.5	100.0

1968 Illinois House of Representatives election
Party	Candidate	Votes	%
Republican	Eugene F. Schlickman (incumbent)	147,634	37.24
Republican	David J. Regner (incumbent)	127,294	32.11
Democratic	Eugenia S. Chapman (incumbent)	67,981	17.15
Democratic	John F. Morrissey	53,565	13.51
Total votes		396,474	100.0

1966 Illinois House of Representatives election
Party	Candidate	Votes	%
Republican	Eugene F. Schlickman (incumbent)	113,614	39.69
Republican	David J. Regner	96,295.5	33.64
Democratic	Eugenia S. Chapman (incumbent)	40,035.5	13.99
Democratic	Bernard M. Peskin	36,306.5	12.68
Total votes		286,251.5	100.0

1962 Illinois House of Representatives election
Party	Candidate	Votes	%
Republican	George E. Dolezal (incumbent)	60,230.5	31.47
Republican	Frank A. Marek (incumbent)	58,868.5	30.76
Democratic	Paul G. Ceaser (incumbent)	40,557	21.19
Democratic	Henry Schwarzel	31,713	16.57
Total votes		191,369	100.0

=== 1960 – 1956 ===
1960 Illinois House of Representatives election
Party	Candidate	Votes	%
Republican	George E. Dolezal (incumbent)	60,703.5	27.17
Republican	Frank A. Marek (incumbent)	56,685	25.37
Democratic	Paul G. Ceaser (incumbent)	54,965	24.60
Democratic	Jerry J. Brousil	51,101	22.87
Total votes		223,454.5	100.0

1958 Illinois House of Representatives election
Party	Candidate	Votes	%
Republican	George E. Dolezal (incumbent)	50,122.5	27.67
Republican	Frank A. Marek (incumbent)	47,469	26.20
Democratic	Paul G. Ceaser (incumbent)	44,667	24.66
Democratic	Harold E. Jaeger	38,905.5	21.48
Total votes		181,164	100.0

1956 Illinois House of Representatives election
Party	Candidate	Votes	%
Republican	George E. Dolezal	66,321.5	30.75
Republican	Frank A. Marek (incumbent)	65,115	30.19
Democratic	Paul G. Ceaser	45,157.5	20.94
Democratic	E. Marvin Capouch	39,087.5	18.12
Total votes		215,681.5	100.0
