= Eva-Dina Delgado =

American politician

Member of the Illinois House of Representatives from the 3rd district
- Incumbent
- Assumed office November 15, 2019
- Preceded by: Luis Arroyo

Personal details
- Party: Democratic
- Education: Wellesley College (BA); DePaul University (JD)

Eva-Dina Delgado is a Democratic member of the Illinois House of Representatives for the 3rd district. The 3rd district, located in the Chicago area, includes parts of Elmwood Park, as well as all or parts of the Chicago neighborhoods of Austin, Belmont Cragin, Dunning, Hermosa, Logan Square, Montclare, and Portage Park.

== Personal life ==
Delgado earned a BA in International Relations in 1999 from Wellesley College, and attained a JD from DePaul University College of Law in 2003.

Prior to attaining office, Delgado worked as Chief of Staff and Assistant to the President for People's Gas.

== Illinois House of Representatives ==
Delgado was appointed to the seat after the resignation of former Illinois state representative Luis Arroyo. Arroyo resigned as the result of an indictment of federal program bribery. Her appointment came under contentious fire from then-Illinois House Speaker Michael Madigan after proxy votes from former representative Arroyo were used to select Delgado as his replacement.

As of July 2, 2022, Representative Delgado is a member of the following committees:

- Appropriations - Public Safety Committee (HAPP)
- Consumer Protection Committee (HCON)
- Elementary & Secondary Education: Administration, Licensing & Charter Schools Committee
- Financial Protection Subcommittee (HCON-FINA)
- Natural Gas Subcommittee (HPUB-NGAS)
- Public Utilities Committee (HPUB)
- Transportation: Vehicles & Safety Committee (HVES)

== Electoral history ==
Illinois 3rd Representative District Democratic Primary, 2020
Party	Candidate	Votes	%
Democratic	Eva-Dina Delgado (incumbent)	6,302	51.55
Democratic	Nidia Carranza	5,922	48.45
Total votes		12,224	100.0

Illinois 3rd Representative District General Election, 2020
Party	Candidate	Votes	%
Democratic	Eva-Dina Delgado (incumbent)	25,453	100.0
Total votes		25,453	100.0

Illinois 3rd Representative District General Election, 2022
Party	Candidate	Votes	%
Democratic	Eva-Dina Delgado (incumbent)	19,056	81.95
Republican	Jonathan Serrano	4,196	18.05
Total votes		23,252	100.0
