= Kelvyn Park =

Park in Chicago, Illinois, United States

Coordinates: 41.9296°N 87.7381°W

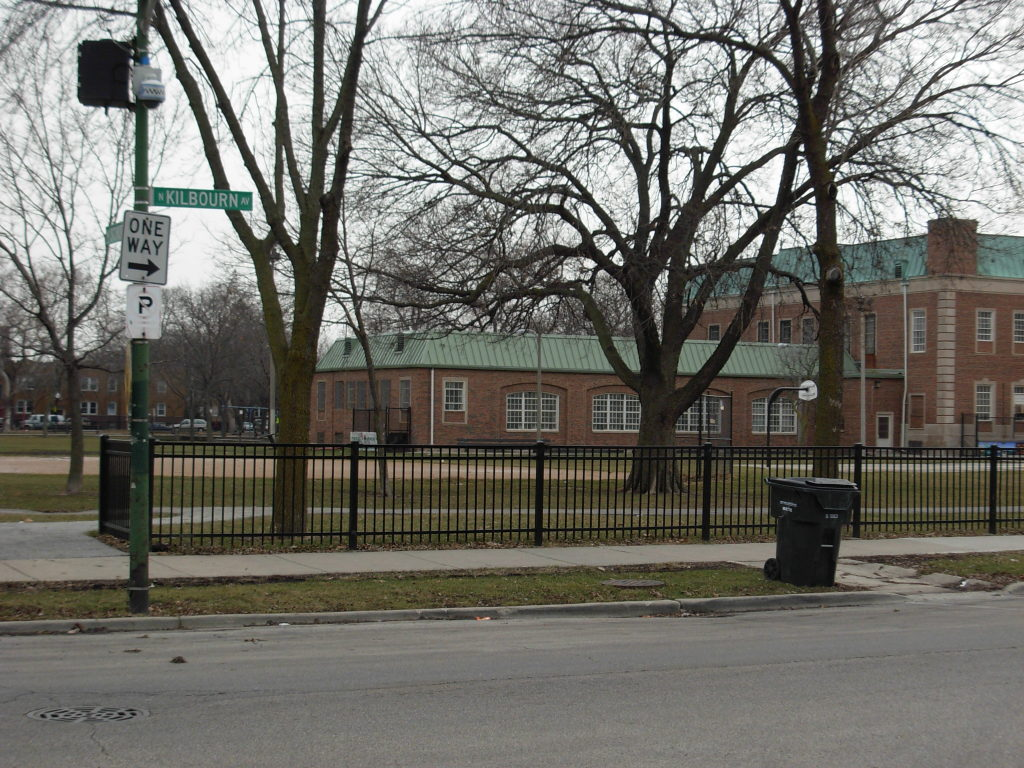
- West side of Kelvyn Park
- Interactive map of Kelvyn Park
- Location: 4438 West Wrightwood Avenue, Hermosa, Chicago, Illinois, United States
- Area: 9.92 acres (4.01 ha)
- Created: 1914–1916
- Designer: American Park Builders Inc.; Walter W. Ahlschlager (fieldhouse)
- Operator: Chicago Park District

Kelvyn Park is a 9.92-acre (4.01 ha) public park at 4438 West Wrightwood Avenue in the Hermosa community area on the northwest side of Chicago, Illinois. Operated by the Chicago Park District, it includes a fieldhouse and outdoor athletic and recreation facilities.

== History ==
Kelvyn Park was one of the original parks developed by the Northwest Park District, which formed in 1911. The district began purchasing land for Kelvyn, Mozart, and Kosciuszko parks in early 1914. Acquisition of the Kelvyn Park site was completed in 1916 after the district bought additional property and vacated streets and alleys. American Park Builders Inc. prepared the park's landscape design.

The park took its name from the surrounding Kelvyn Park subdivision. The surrounding area had earlier been known as Kelvyn Grove.

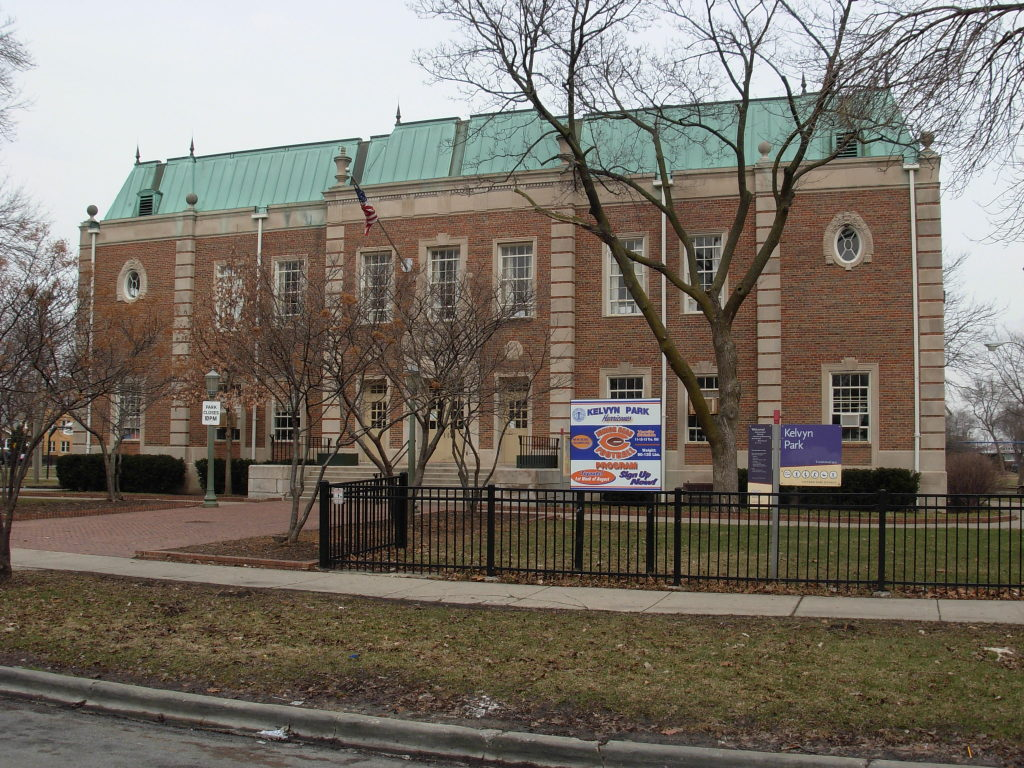
The Kelvyn Park fieldhouse

In 1928, the Northwest Park District built a two-story brick fieldhouse designed by architect Walter W. Ahlschlager. It is similar to Ahlschlager's fieldhouses at Riis Park and Simons Park. Kelvyn Park became part of the Chicago Park District in 1934, when the city's independent park commissions were consolidated into a single agency.

=== Modern improvements ===
The playground was renovated in fall 2014 through the Chicago Plays! initiative.

In 2022, a proposal submitted by the Kelvyn Park Advisory Council received a $1.5 million Chicago Works Community Challenge award for fieldhouse roof repairs and accessibility improvements. On May 8, 2024, the Park District Board approved a contract with All-Bry Construction Company for up to $2.933 million. The project included a new accessible ramp, exterior stairs and front plaza; renovated bathrooms and clubrooms; roof and utility repairs; environmental remediation; and mechanical, electrical, and plumbing work.

== Facilities ==
The fieldhouse contains a fitness center, gymnasium, auditorium, meeting rooms, and a small kitchen. The grounds include two walking paths, two softball fields, a combined football and soccer field, basketball and volleyball courts, two tennis courts, horseshoe courts, a playground, and a water-spray feature.
