= Anthony Quezada =

American politician (born 1995)

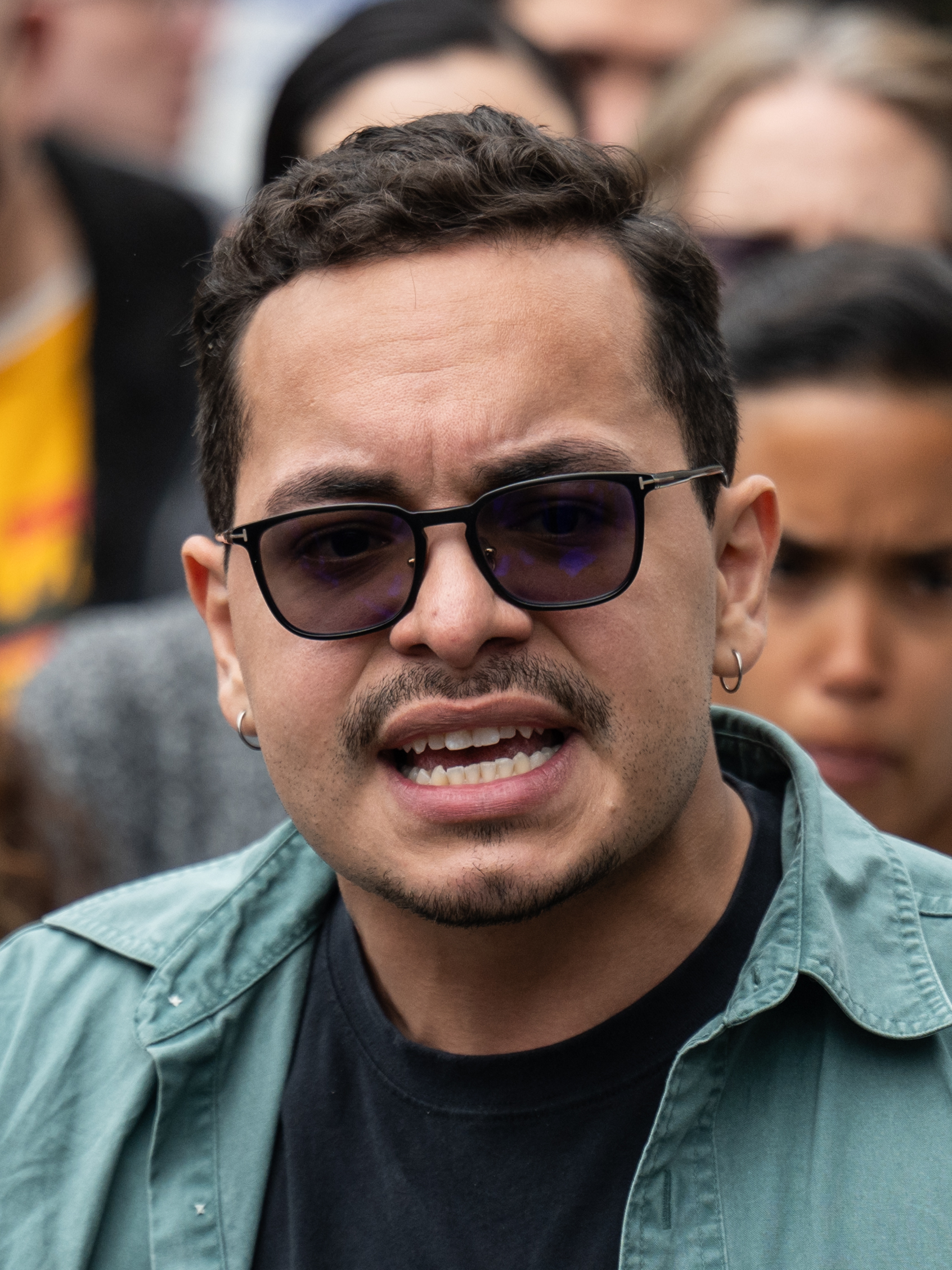
- Quezada, circa 2025

Member of the Chicago City Council from the 35th ward
- Incumbent
- Assumed office April 7, 2025
- Preceded by: Carlos Ramirez-Rosa

Member of the Cook County Board of Commissioners from the 8th district
- In office December 5, 2022 – April 7, 2025
- Preceded by: Luis Arroyo Jr.
- Succeeded by: Jessica Vasquez

Personal details
- Born: Anthony Joel Quezada; November 10, 1995 (age 30) Chicago, Illinois, U.S.
- Party: Democratic
- Other political affiliations: Democratic Socialists of America
- Website: Official website

Anthony Joel Quezada (born November 10, 1995) is a Democratic politician based in Chicago. He is the alderman for Chicago City Council's 35th ward, having been appointed to replace Carlos Ramirez-Rosa in April 2025. The 35th ward includes parts of the Avondale and Logan Square neighborhoods. He previously served on the Cook County Board of Commissioners from 2022 to 2025.

== Early life, education, and career ==
Quezada was born and raised in Logan Square, Chicago. He attended Goethe Elementary School and Lane Tech College Prep High School.

Prior to his roles in elected office, he was a community organizer with United Neighbors of the 35th Ward and served as constituent services director for then-35th ward alderperson Carlos Ramirez-Rosa. In 2020, he was elected as the Cook County Democratic Party committeeperson for the 35th ward.

== Cook County Board of Commissioners ==
Quezada ran for the 8th district seat in the 2022 Cook County Board of Commissioners election, defeating incumbent Luis Arroyo Jr. with 35% of the vote in a five-way Democracy primary election and winning uncontested in the general election. The 8th district is majority-Latino and includes all or parts of the northwest side Chicago neighborhoods of Logan Square, Avondale, Irving Park, Humboldt Park, Hermosa, Belmont Cragin, Portage Park, Montclare, and Dunning. Quezada was endorsed by several progressive political organizations and elected officials in the area, including U.S. Representative Chuy García. Quezada was the youngest Cook County Commissioner ever elected at 26 years old, and he was the first openly gay Latino to serve on the Board.

== Chicago City Council ==
On March 2, 2025, Quezada announced that he would seek appointment to the 35th ward seat after incumbent Carlos Ramirez-Rosa resigned to take office as CEO of the Chicago Park District. He gained the support of Ramirez-Rosa and United Neighbors of the 35th Ward. On April 2, Mayor Brandon Johnson announced that he would appoint Quezada. The City Council voted to confirm his appointment on April 7 by a margin of 32–11.

== See also ==
- List of Chicago alderpersons since 1923
