= Edwin Reyes =

Edwin Reyes may refer to:

- Edwin Reyes (American politician)
- Edwin Reyes (Gibraltarian politician)
