= Cook County Board of Commissioners 8th district =

Cook County Board of Commissioners 8th district butch
- District
- District 8th
- Current Board of Commissioners map, 8th district highlighted in red
- Country: United States
- State: Illinois
- County: Cook
- Townships and equivalent jurisdictions: list: Chicago

Government
  - Type: District
  - Body: Cook County Board of Commissioners
  - Commissioner: Jessica Vasquez (D)

Cook County Board of Commissioners 8th district is a single-member electoral district for the Cook County Board of Commissioners. It is currently represented by Jessica Vasquez, a Democrat.

== History ==
The district was established in 1994, when the board transitioned from holding elections in individual districts, as opposed to the previous practice of having two multi-member districts: one for ten members from the city of Chicago and another for seven members from suburban Cook County.

== Geography ==
Throughout its history, the district has been located in the Near Northwest Side of Chicago.

=== 1994 boundaries ===
When the district was first established, it represented parts of the Near Northwest Side of Chicago.

=== 2001 redistricting ===
New boundaries were adopted in August 2001, with redistricting taking place following the 2000 United States census. The boundaries were entirely within the city of Chicago. It represented Near Northwest Chicago.

=== 2012 redistricting ===
The district currently, as redistricted in 2012 following the 2010 United States census, continued to be entirely located entirely within the city boundaries of Chicago, and largely resembled the shape that the district already had before the redistricting.

The district was 14.26 square miles (9,130 acres).

=== 2022 redistricting ===
The district, as redistricted in 2022 following the 2020 United States census is entirely located in the city of Chicago.

== Politics ==
The district has only ever been represented by Democratic commissioners. Only once has another party run a nominee in an election in this district.

== List of commissioners representing the district ==
Commissioner	Party	Years	Electoral history
Roberto Maldonado	Democratic	December 1994–August 2009	Elected in 1994, 1998, 2002, 2006; resigned in August 2009 to serve on the Chicago City Council
Edwin Reyes	Democratic	August 2009–December 2014	Appointed in August 2009; elected in 2010; lost reelection in 2014
Luis Arroyo Jr.	Democratic	December 1, 2014 – December 5, 2022	Elected in 2014 and 2018; lost reelection in 2022
Anthony Quezada	Democratic	December 5, 2022 – April 7, 2025	Elected in 2022
Jessica Vasquez	Democratic	May 4, 2025–present	Appointed

== Election results ==
Cook County Board of Commissioners 8th district general elections
Year	Winning candidate	Party	Vote (pct)	Opponent	Party	Vote (pct)
1994	Roberto Maldonado	Democratic				
1998	Roberto Maldonado	Democratic	31,356 (100%)			
2002	Roberto Maldonado	Democratic	38,741 (100%)			
2006	Roberto Maldonado	Democratic	38,795 (100%)			
2010	Edwin Reyes	Democratic	37,147 (100%)			
2014	Luis Arroyo Jr.	Democratic	37,529 (100%)			
2018	Luis Arroyo Jr.	Democratic	73,296 (89.29%)	Walter Zarnecki	Republican	8,792 (10.71%)
2022	Anthony Joel Quezada	Democratic	53,400 (100%)			
