= Sheridan Plaza Hotel =

Residential building in Chicago, Illinois

- U.S. National Register of Historic Places
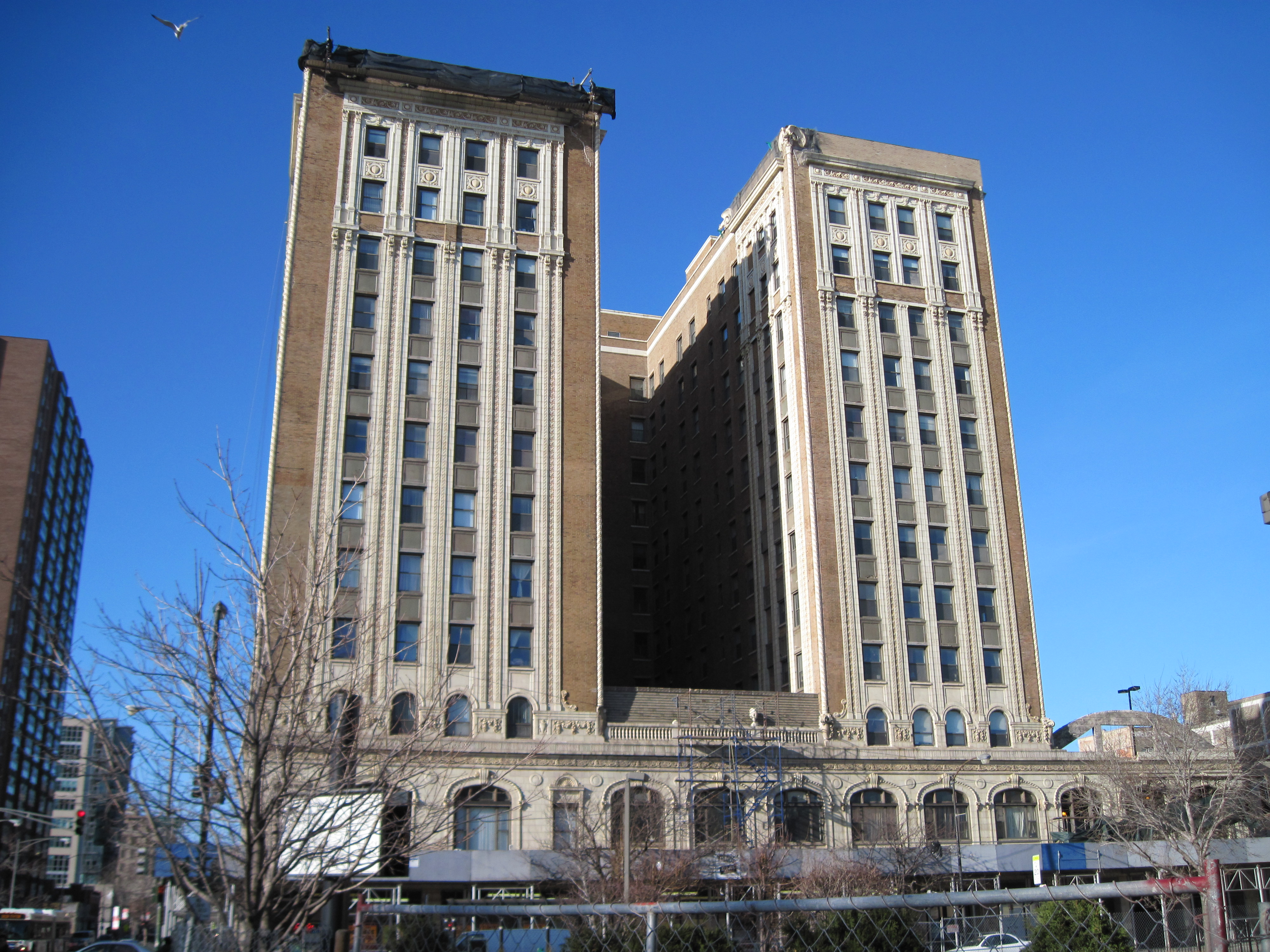
- Sheridan Plaza Hotel under renovation in 2010

- Location within Chicago metropolitan area Location within Illinois Location within the United States
- Location: 4601–4613 N. Sheridan Rd., Chicago, Illinois
- Coordinates: 41°57′56″N 87°39′16″W
- Area: 0.7 acres (0.28 ha)
- Built: 1920
- Architect: Walter W. Ahlschlager
- NRHP reference No.: 80001350
- Added to NRHP: November 21, 1980

The Sheridan Plaza Hotel is a historic former hotel, now an apartment complex, located at the corner of Wilson Avenue and Sheridan Road in the Uptown neighborhood of Chicago, Illinois. The hotel was designed by Walter Ahlschlager.

== Overview ==
Construction on the hotel was completed in 1920 at a cost of $2 million ($32.1 million in 2025).

The hotel opened in 1921. The brick building features extensive terra cotta ornamentation, including gargoyle griffins on some of the top corners. The hotel was the first high-rise building in Uptown. The Chicago Cubs and visiting teams that played the Cubs stayed in the hotel; the building was also a popular site for weddings and dances. After the hotel closed, the building sat vacant and deteriorated significantly, and some of the terra cotta decorations fell off the side of the building. In 2009, a realty group renovated the property and reopened it as the Sheridan Plaza Apartments.

== Recognition ==
The hotel was added to the National Register of Historic Places on November 21, 1980.
