= Eugenia S. Chapman =

American politician

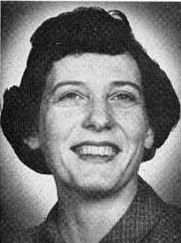

Member of the Illinois House of Representatives from the 3rd district
- In office 1965 – 1983

House Minority Whip
- In office 1981 – 1983

Personal details
- Born: January 10, 1923 Fairhope, Alabama
- Died: September 30, 1994 (aged 71)
- Party: Democratic
- Education: Chicago Teachers College
- Occupation: Educator; Politician

Eugenia Sheldon Chapman (January 10, 1923 – September 30, 1994) was an American educator and politician who served as a Democratic member of the Illinois House of Representatives from 1965 to 1983. During her final term, she became the first woman to hold a leadership position in the Illinois House of Representatives.

== Early life and career ==
Eugenia Sheldon was born in Fairhope, Alabama, on January 10, 1923. Her father died 5 months before she was born. The family moved to Chicago in 1930, where her mother became a live in maid while Eugenia was lived with various relatives.

She earned a Bachelor of Education from Chicago Teachers College in 1944, while working as a maid for one of her high school teachers for room and board. She graduated valedictorian.

She then taught in Cicero, Illinois and at Chicago Public Schools. During the 1940s, she was also active as a counselor and director of children's summer camps.

She taught schools in Chicago and Skokie, Illinois. In 1952, Chapman moved to Arlington Heights, Illinois. She was a president and charter member of the Arlington Heights chapter of the League of Women Voters. She served on the Township High School District 214 Board of Education from 1961 to 1964.

== Political career ==
Chapman served as a Democratic member of the Illinois House of Representatives from 1965 to 1983. In 1970, she was a delegate to White House Conference on Children and Youth.

In 1965, the first year she was in the house she was the primary sponsor of House Bill No. 1710 - Illinois Public Junior College Act - that would become the law to fund community colleges and helped to created the Illinois Community Colleges system. She would go on to help found Harper College in 1969 and would remain on the Board of Trustees until her death.

From 1973 to 1975, she was a legislative member of the Illinois Commission on the Status of Women and chaired its Legislative Action Committee. She was a chief Illinois sponsor of the proposed Equal Rights Amendment, and of the Illinois Public Junior College Act. She chaired the Committee on Human Resources from 1975 to 1979 and chaired the Appropriations II Committee in 1980. She served as Democratic Whip from 1981 to 1983 making her the first woman to hold an Illinois House leadership position in state history. During her legislative career, she was awarded the best legislator award from Independent Voters of Illinois-Independent Precinct Organization multiple times.

In the 1982 United States House of Representatives elections, Chapman ran for Congress losing to John Porter receiving 41% of the vote. In 1983, Neil Hartigan named Chapman the Chief of the Division of Senior Citizen Advocacy and Coordinator for Community Education in Office of Illinois Attorney General. She served there until her retirement in 1989.

She served as the township Democratic committeewoman for Wheeling Township for a time and served as a committeewoman from the 10th district on the Illinois Democratic Central Committee from 1983 until her death.

=== The ERA and Richard J. Daley ===
She was a chief sponsor of the ERA. She led the measure to be passed in the Illinois House although it failed in the senate due to not meeting the three fifths requirement. She often worked together with Giddy Dyer, a Republican from Hinsdale. In 1972, Illinois faced a pivotal moment in the fight for the Equal Rights Amendment (ERA), closely linked to the efforts of Representative Eugenia Chapman, a key proponent and chief sponsor of the ERA. During this period, Illinois did not pass the ERA, an outcome influenced by significant political events at the Democratic National Convention.

That year, the convention was marked by the nomination of George McGovern, who ran on a progressive platform. Amidst the political maneuvering, a group of Illinois progressives successfully challenged the authority of Mayor Richard J. Daley, leading to his and his affiliates' removal from the state's delegation. Eugenia Chapman played a central role in this political upheaval, contributing to the unseating of Daley. The ramifications of these events were significant for Chapman's legislative career. It is speculated that Daley harbored a strong resentment towards Chapman, impacting her subsequent legislative initiatives. This personal and political conflict likely played a role in the continuous obstruction of the ERA's passage in Illinois as long as Daley remained influential.

The first vote on the ERA in the Illinois Senate took place in late May 1972, by which time 18 other states had already ratified the amendment. Despite Chapman's efforts, the political climate, shaped by her confrontation with Daley, posed a significant barrier to the ERA's progress in Illinois. By the following year, the number of ratifying states had increased to 30, underscoring a growing national support for the amendment, even as Chapman's advocacy faced challenges at the state level.

== Death and legacy ==
Chapman died at the Northwest Community Continuing Care Center in Arlington Heights, Illinois. After her death, her family created the Eugenia S. Champan Memorial Scholarship Fund under the Harper College Education Foundation. Two years after her death, Harper College announced the renaming of Women's Center of Harper College after Chapman. In the television miniseries, Mrs. America, Chapman's leading role in the ERA is mentioned and in the episode "Gloria", Chapman is played by actress Alison Brooks.
