= Luis Arroyo Jr. =

American politician

Luis Arroyo

Member of the Cook County Board of Commissioners from the 8th district
- In office December 1, 2014 – December 5, 2022
- Preceded by: Edwin Reyes
- Succeeded by: Anthony Quezada

Personal details
- Party: Democratic

Luis Arroyo Jr. is a former Democratic member of the Cook County Board of Commissioners, representing the 8th district.

In 2014 Arroyo defeated incumbent Edwin Reyes to become a Cook County commissioner.

In 2015, Arroyo was a key vote to raise the Cook County sales tax. Arroyo is the son of former Illinois State Representative Luis Arroyo.

In 2021, Arroyo's taxes were subpoenaed by Federal prosecutors as part of a broader corruption probe investigating connections between lobbyists and Illinois politicians.

In 2022, Arroyo lost his Democratic primary for reelection to challenger Anthony Quezada.
