= 25th Illinois General Assembly =

Meeting of the Illinois state legislature from 1866 to 1868

The 25th Illinois General Assembly, consisting of the Illinois Senate and the Illinois House of Representatives, met in Springfield, Illinois in three sessions from January 7, 1867 to February 28, 1867 (First Session), from June 11, 1867 to June 13, 2867 (Second Session), and from June 14, 1867 to June 28, 1867 (Third Session).

The 25th General Assembly was preceded by the 24th Illinois General Assembly, and was succeeded by the 26th Illinois General Assembly.

== Works cited ==
- Moses, John (1892). Illinois, historical and statistical.
- Blue Book of the State of Illinois - Illinois Legislative Roster — 1818-2024 (PDF). 2024. Archived from the original (PDF) on July 15, 2026 – via WayBack Machine.
