= InterContinental Chicago Magnificent Mile =

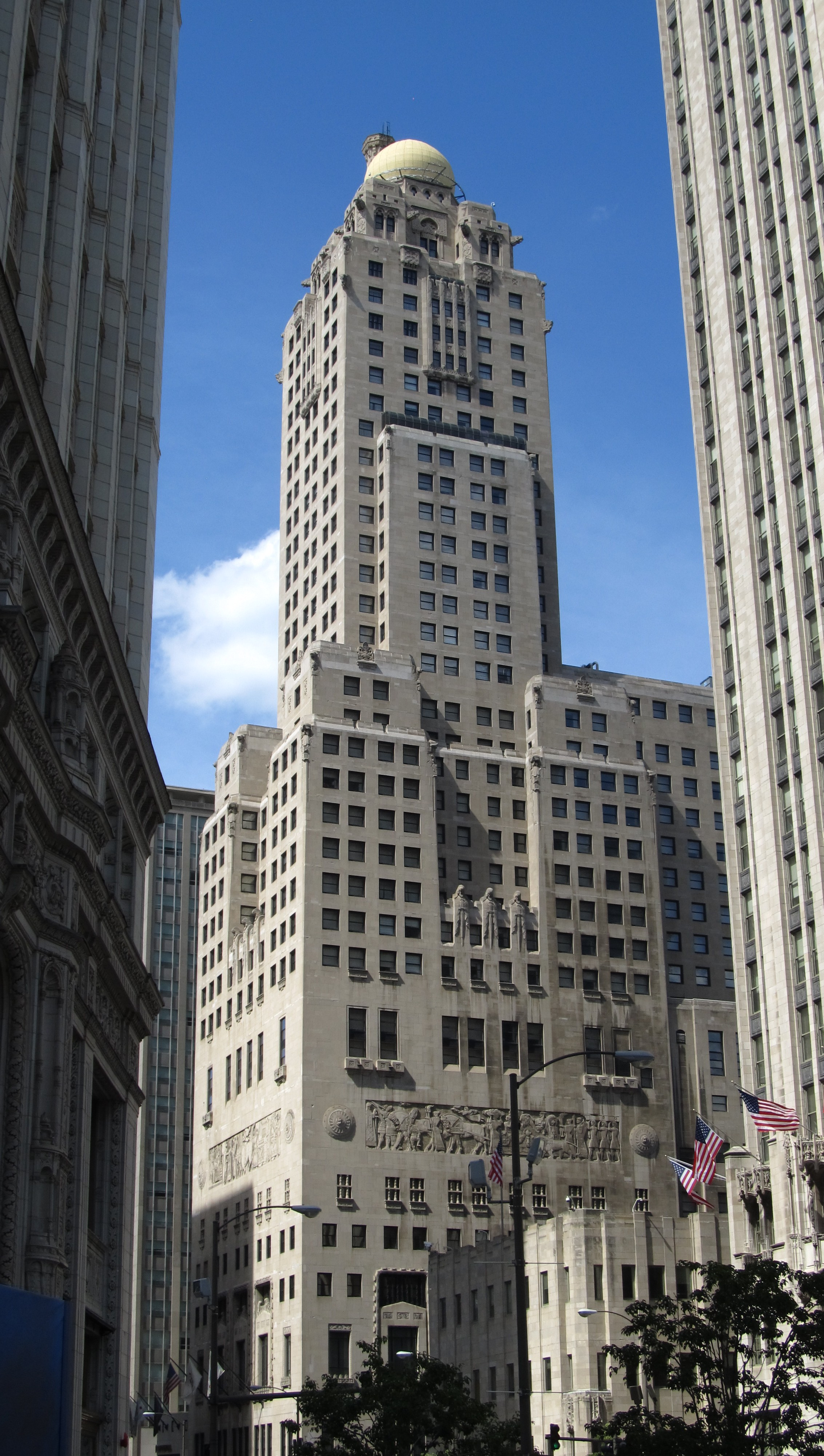

General information
- Status: Completed
- Location: Chicago, Illinois, United States, 505 Michigan Avenue
- Coordinates: 41.8912°N 87.6237°W

Height
- Roof: 471 ft (144 m)

Technical details
- Floor count: 26 (North Tower); 42 (Executive Tower)

Design and construction
- Architect: Walter W. Ahlschlager

InterContinental Chicago Magnificent Mile is a hotel in Chicago, United States. The hotel currently occupies two multi-story buildings. The historic tower, or "South Tower," is a 471-foot (144 m), 42-story building which was completed in 1929 originally as the home of the Medinah Athletic Club. The new tower, or "North Tower" is a 295-foot (90 m), 26-story addition, completed in 1961.

InterContinental Chicago Magnificent Mile is a member of Historic Hotels of America, the official program of the National Trust for Historic Preservation.

== History ==
=== Medinah Athletic Club ===
Before the stock market crash of 1929, the United States was experiencing a building boom. One of these projects was the future home of the Medinah Athletic Club in Chicago, commissioned by the Shriners Organization and designed by architect Walter W. Ahlschlager. The Chicago Shriners Club purchased the property at the northeast corner of Michigan Avenue and Illinois Street directly north of the Tribune Tower for $1 million, while $5 million more was spent on building and equipping what was then to be the 42 story Medinah Athletic Club. The plan was for there to be 3500 members, all of whom had to be a Shriner; at the time of the announcement in 1925, 1000 Shriners had taken out founder memberships for the club. The ceremony to lay the cornerstone of the Medinah Athletic Club was held on November 5, 1928, and to commemorate the occasion, a copper time capsule was placed within the cornerstone. The capsule, which currently remains sealed within the hotel's limestone exterior, contains records of the organization, photographs of members, and a copy of the Chicago Tribune announcing the proposal of the building, as well as coins and other historic data. Construction of the building's 42 floors and 440 guest rooms was completed in 1929, and its facilities were made available for the exclusive use of the club's members and guests.

=== Design ===
The Medinah Athletic Club building was intended to combine elements of many architectural styles. At the eighth floor, its Indiana limestone facade was decorated by three large relief carvings in ancient Assyrian style. Each frieze depicted a different scene in the order of constructing a building, with Contribution on the south wall, Wisdom represented on the west wall and Consecration on the north. (According to an article in the Chicago Tribune from Sept 16, 1928 entitled “Building art inspires panels”: “The friezes were designed by George Unger, in collaboration with Walter Ahlschlager, and carved by Léon Hermant. The figures are costumed in the period of the building, which is that of an old fortress in Mesopotamia in Xerxes time, about 5th century BC. The theme of the panels as explained by Mr. Unger, was inspired by the history of construction of any building. The south panel starts the story. Here a magnificent cortege is displayed. This panel, termed Contribution, signifies the getting together of treasures for the construction of the building. In the west panel, facing Michigan Avenue, a ruler is shown with his counselors and an architect is shown bringing in a model of the building planned. The north panel shows the consecration of the building after it has been built. A priest is sacrificing a white bull whose blood will be mixed with crushed grapes and poured into the earth. A monkey trainer and his animals are shown. Since the animals represented bigotry in the ancient drawings, they are shown here in leash as symbolic belief that bigotry has no place in the Masonic order.”) The figures in all three scenes are said to be modeled after the faces of club members at the time of its design. Three Sumerian warriors were also carved into the facade at the twelfth-floor setback, directly above the Michigan Avenue entrance, and remain visible today.

Extending the Moorish imagery, the building is topped by a gold-painted dome. In the tower beneath the great dome, the club featured a miniature golf course on the twenty-third floor, complete with water hazards and a wandering brook; also a shooting range, billiards hall, running track, gymnasium, archery range, bowling alley, two-story boxing arena, and a junior Olympic size swimming pool - all this in addition to the ballrooms, meeting rooms, and 440 guest rooms which were available for the exclusive use of the club's 3,500 members and their guests.

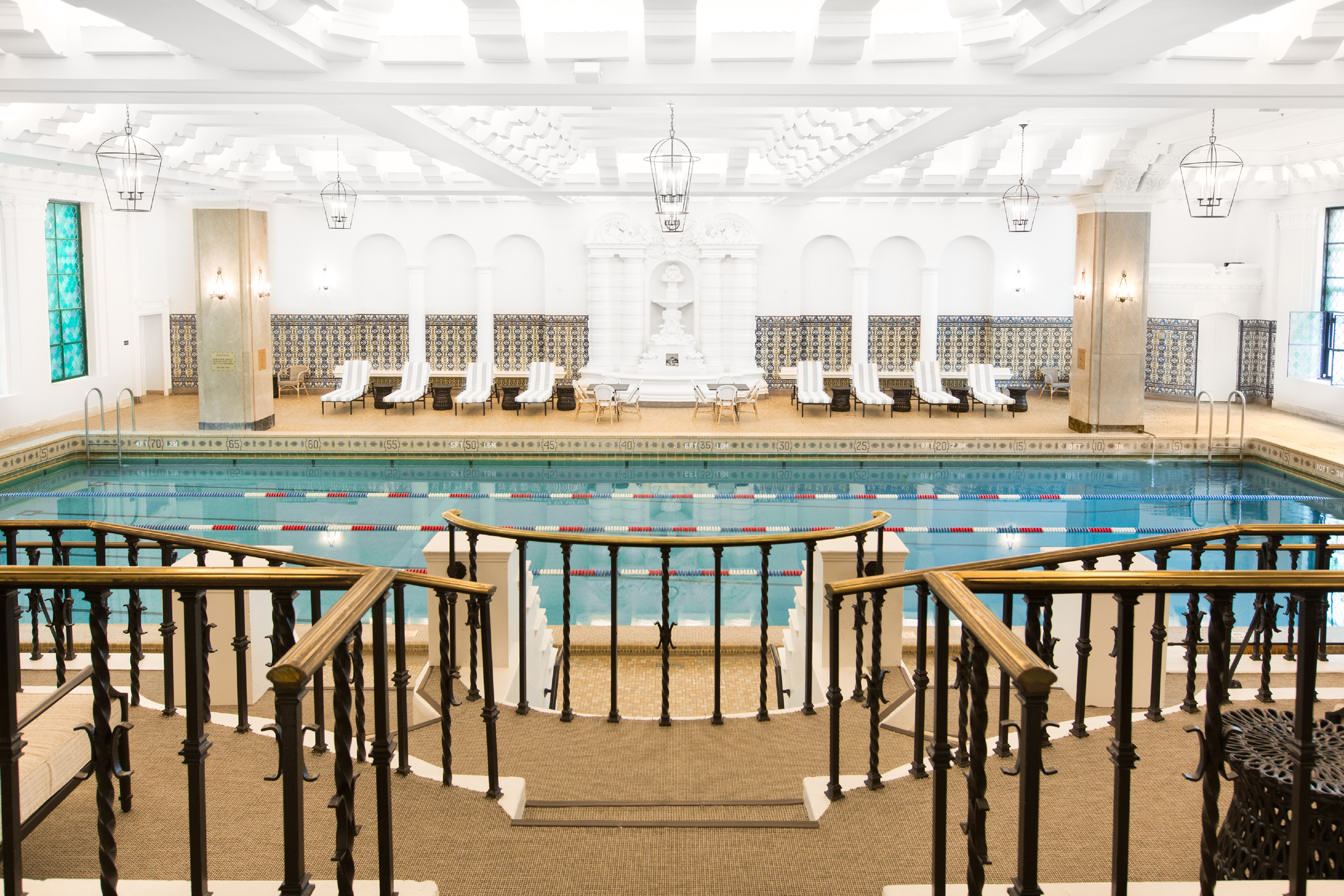
InterContinental Chicago Pool

At the time, the pool was one of the highest indoor pools in the world, and its fourteen-floor location was heralded as a grand feat of engineering. Today it is commonly referred to as the Johnny Weissmuller pool, after the famous Olympic athlete and actor who trained in it. The rows of seats which remain on its western wall recall the days when swimming was a popular spectator sport. Its blue Spanish majolica tiles and terra-cotta fountain of Neptune on its east wall remain virtually unchanged today.

The elegant Grand Ballroom, a two-story, 100-foot (30 m) elliptical space, was decorated with ornaments in Egyptian, Assyrian, and Greek styles and was surrounded by a horseshoe-shaped mezzanine. In its center hung a 12,000-pound Baccarat crystal chandelier, the largest in North America.

The somewhat more masculine King Arthur Court was built to function as the men's smoking lounge, and featured heavy timbering, stained glass, and a mural depicting the stories of King Arthur and Parsifal. At this men's club, facilities for women were considerably less grand. They were allowed only in designated areas, and were provided a separate entrance and elevator to visit the Grand Ballroom for social gatherings or to access the Women's Plunge, Lounge and Tea Room, called the Renaissance Ballroom. Female guests also had access to an outdoor loggia overlooking Michigan Avenue, which was decorated with the intention of evoking a Venetian terrace.

=== Hotel conversion ===
The club filed for bankruptcy in 1934, and following a lengthy battle, in 1944 the building was sold to developer John J. Mack, who converted it to a 650-room hotel at a cost of $1 million, renaming it the Hotel Continental. Esther Williams swam in the pool in the building's athletic club, renamed the Town Club of Chicago. Three years later, in 1947, Mack sold the hotel to Sheraton Hotels. It was renamed the Sheraton Hotel and later the Sheraton-Chicago Hotel. In 1961 Sheraton expanded the hotel, adding a 26-story second tower just north of the existing building. During this era, the hotel featured an outlet of the popular Polynesian themed Kon-Tiki Ports restaurant chain. A facade of lava rock adorned the northern wall along Grand Avenue, where today only a small section remains visible, tucked at the end of the balcony of Zest's outdoor café. MAT Associates purchased the hotel from Sheraton in 1978, and brought in Radisson Hotels to manage the hotel, which was renamed the Radisson Chicago Hotel. MAT Associates terminated Radisson's contract in 1983 and returned the property to its original name, Hotel Continental. MAT closed the hotel in November 1986 for a renovation. In August 1987, plans were announced for the property to be managed by Inter-Continental Hotels and split into two hotels. The 1961 North Tower would reopen first as the 547-room Forum Hotel (the budget-priced division of Inter-Continental), while the historic 1929 South Tower would be restored as the 346-room Inter-Continental Chicago.

=== Restoration ===
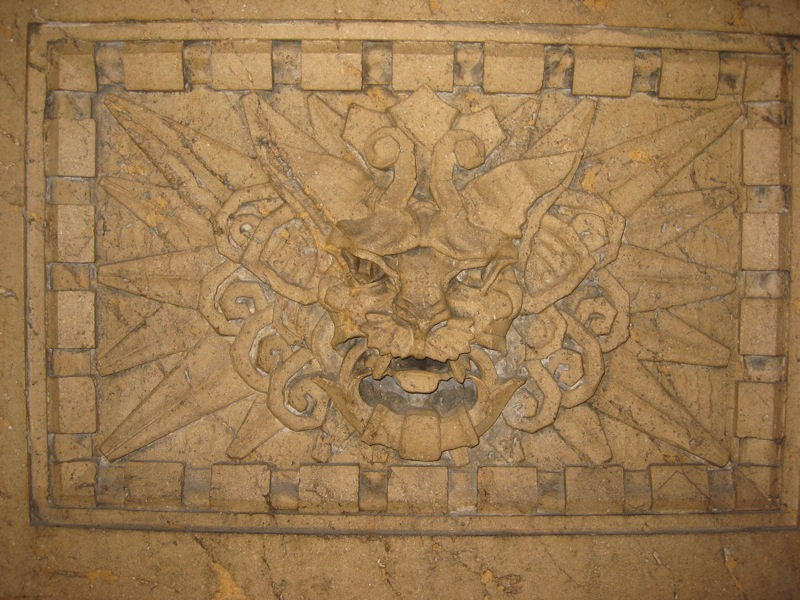
Example of a lion carving in the hotel

A former Medinah Club member read of the renovation and donated the first anniversary edition of the club's magazine, The Scimitar. The magazine contained photographs of the club, which were used to aid in the building's restoration. Photographs were enlarged and used to recreate the carpeting, the furniture, the stenciling in the ceilings, the colors of the rooms, and the draperies.

The balcony of the Grand Ballroom, which had long since been removed, was rebuilt to match its original design. The murals were restored by Lido Lippi, who had previously worked on the restoration of the Sistine Chapel. Lippi also replicated eight other paintings, which had been stolen many years prior.

In the Hall of Lions, workers at first utilized a process called cornhusk blasting to strip away the many layers of paint from the marble walls, because traditional sandblasting would have destroyed the intricate details of any etchings beneath. When, however, it was determined that a single marble column would require a ton of ground corn cobs, restorers decided to scrub away the paint by hand. The two carvings of lions which were discovered underneath have become an emblem used throughout the hotel.

=== Re-opening ===
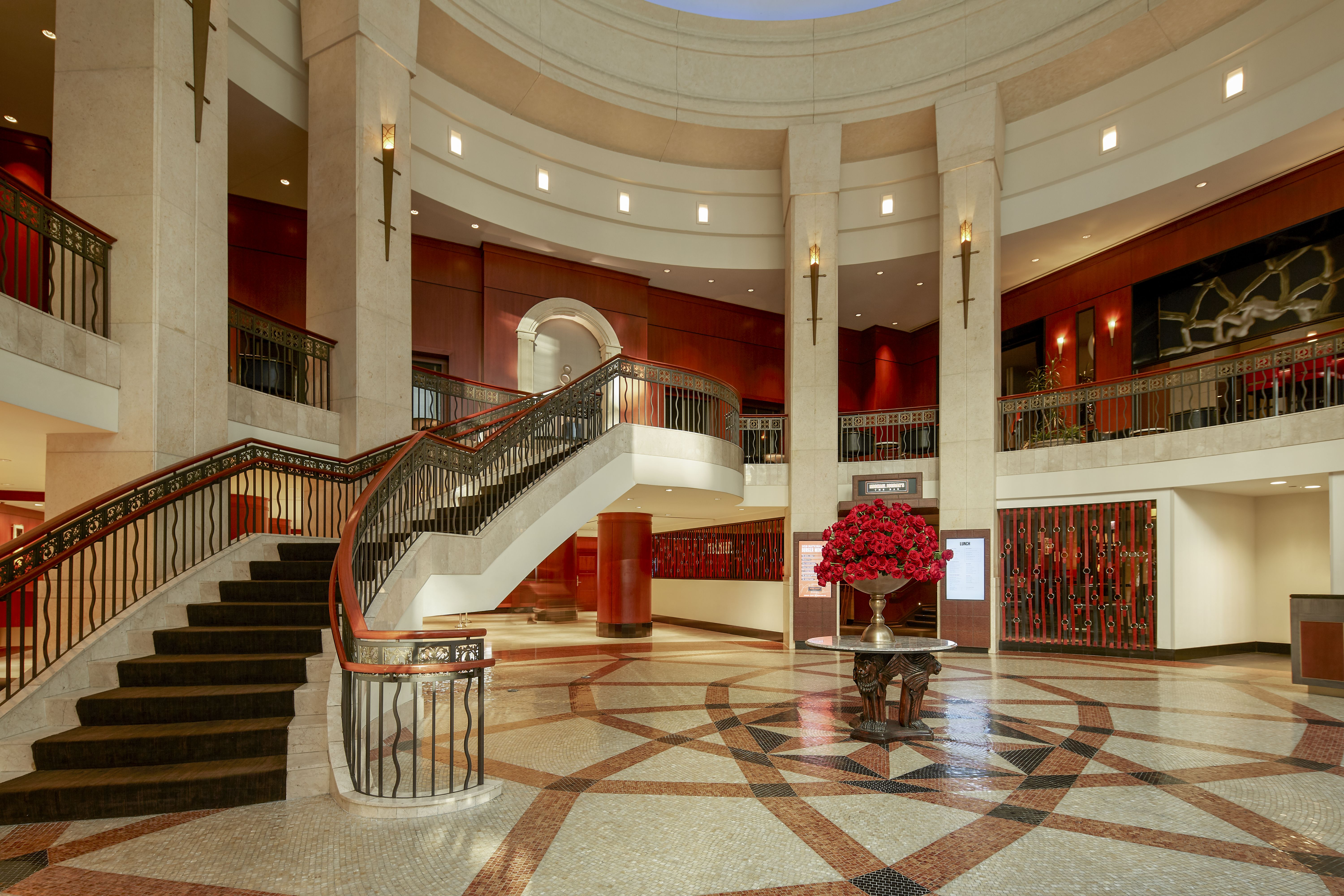
Hotel Lobby

The Forum Hotel opened first, in 1989, while the historic Inter-Continental Chicago opened its doors to the public in March 1990. Although operated as separate properties, the two shared back-of-the-house facilities and the division proved short-lived. Only four years later, in April 1994, the Forum Hotel was merged into the Inter-Continental Chicago in a $10 million renovation, bringing it to a total of 792 rooms. A new entrance and a four-story lobby were built, combining elements of both architectural styles. Its grand staircase, which ascends to the banquet space above, is lined with banisters bearing intricate cast bronze ornamentation. An illuminated rotunda is capable of changing colors and creating the illusion of twinkling stars against a night sky.

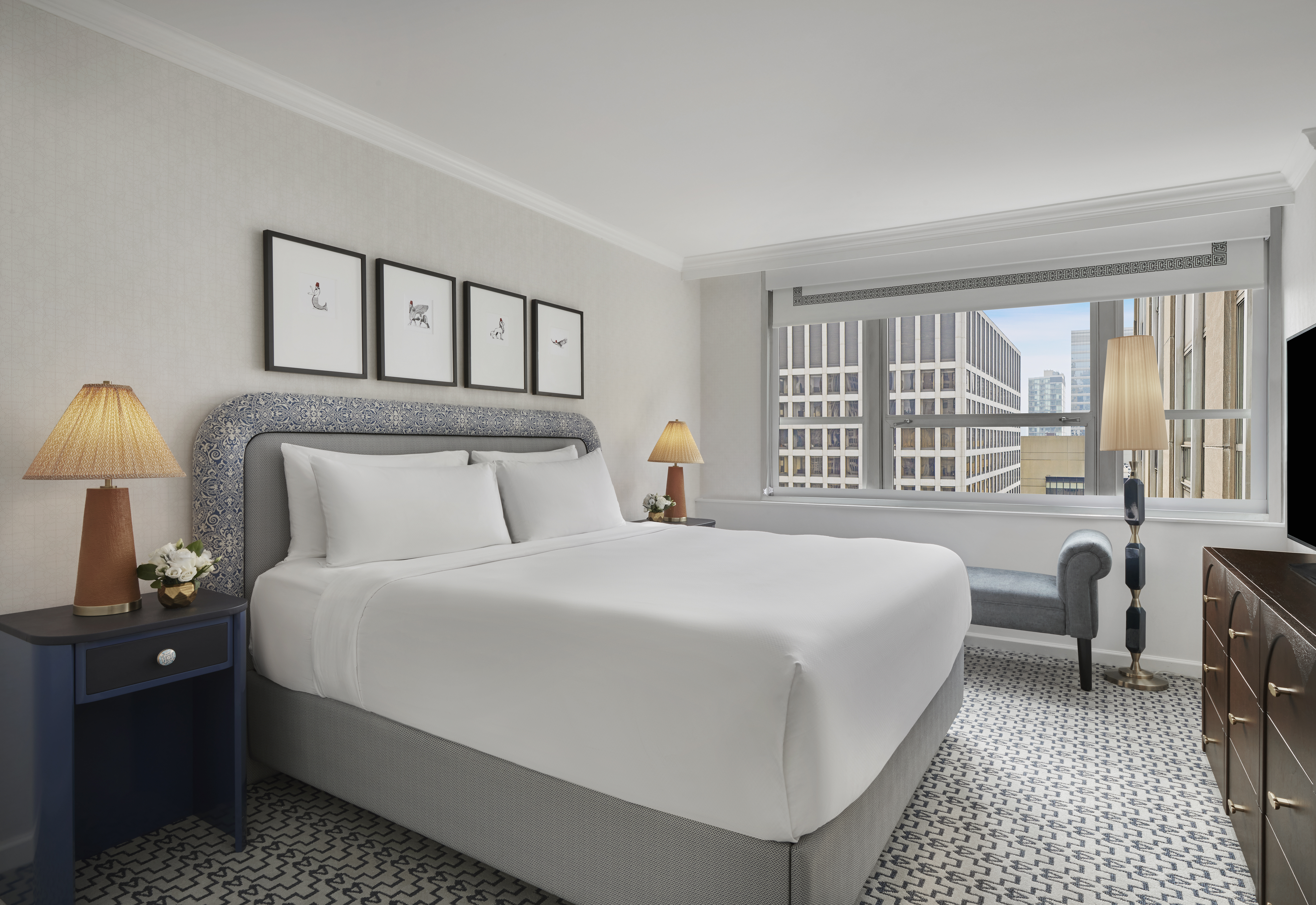
Grand Tower

=== Renovation ===
In 2023, InterContinental Chicago Magnificent Mile completed a renovation of its Grand Tower, which included updates to all 477 guest rooms. The project aimed to modernize the accommodations while referencing the building’s historic origins. The hotel is located along Michigan Avenue, a major commercial corridor in Chicago.

The renovation was designed by KTGY Simeone Deary Design Group. The updated guest rooms incorporate design references to the property’s former use as the Medinah Athletic Club, drawing from a range of historical influences including Moorish, Turkish, Greek, Persian, and Celtic elements. Custom furnishings and artwork were created to reflect architectural details found on the building’s exterior.

=== Dining ===
In 2025, the hotel opened Casa Chi, a food and beverage venue located at the corner of Illinois Street and Michigan Avenue. The concept was developed by chef Richard Sandoval and is described as a Nikkei-style lounge, blending elements of Japanese and Peruvian cuisine.

=== Events and Programming ===
The hotel hosts recurring on-site programming throughout the year, including live jazz events and a sound bath series. Visit the hotels website for more information.

== See also ==
- Strategic Hotels & Resorts
- InterContinental Hotels Group
