= The Brickyard (shopping mall) =

- Signage at the entrance to the Brickyard in 2026
- Location: Chicago, Illinois, United States
- Coordinates: 41.92760635390614°N 87.78892029842555°W
- Address: 2600 North Narragansett Avenue
- Opened: March 16, 1977; 49 years ago
- Developer: Maisel and Associates
- Manager: CBRE Group
- Owner: CBRE Group
- Num. of stores: 100+ (original mall)
- Num. of anchor tenants: 3
- Floor area: 876,000 square feet (81,400 m^{2}) (original mall); 261,369 square feet (24,282.0 m^{2}) (current mall)
- Floors: 3 (original mall); 1 (current mall)
- Public transit: CTA

The Brickyard, sometimes known as the Brickyard Mall, is a shopping mall located in the Belmont-Cragin community area of Chicago, Illinois, U.S. Built in 1977 as an enclosed shopping mall featuring J. C. Penney, Kmart, and Montgomery Ward, it was redeveloped in 2003 as a strip mall. The center's anchor stores are Jewel, Target, Marshalls, and Lowe's. The Brickyard is owned and managed by CBRE Group.

== History ==
Maisel and Associates, a real estate company based out of Southfield, Michigan, worked with local developer Harry Chaddick to develop The Brickyard. Their research determined a need for a shopping mall on the northwestern side of Chicago, Illinois. The center was named The Brickyard because it was formerly on the site of a brickyard for the Carey Brick Company. After the brickyard closed in 1960, the Carey family turned the site into a ski resort named Thunder Mountain, opening in 1968. Thunder Mountain was the tallest ski slope for 200 miles at the time. After one season of operation, sparse snowfall and low interest led the Carey family to scrap plans to expand the ski slope operation and sell the property.

Due to the elevation of the hill, the development of the mall is divided into sections. The first section of the mall to open was a "convenience center" featuring a Jewel supermarket and a Kmart discount store on either side of a strip mall. This section of the mall opened in 1977 while the second phase, a 100-store enclosed mall with Montgomery Ward and J. C. Penney, opened in 1979. Carson Pirie Scott was also considered for a third anchor store to the mall, but Maisel was unable to secure a lease for the chain.

As the shopping mall did not encompass the entirety of the former brickyard, portions of it remained vacant until 1983, when the city of Chicago acquired a $10,000,000 grant to demolish the remaining unused portions of the former brickyard and sell the lot to Maisel and Associates for future mall expansion. MetLife bought the mall from Maisel and Associates in December 1986 for an undisclosed price. At the time, The Brickyard was 99 percent leased. As part of the acquisition, an adjacent strip mall called Bricktown Square also began immediately to the south; this center included Toys "R" Us, Frank's Nursery & Crafts, Sport Mart sporting goods store, and a six-screen cinema owned by Plitt Theatres.

In 1997, the Kmart at The Brickyard was the first in the Chicago area to be renovated into that chain's "Big Kmart" concept, which included a small grocery section. Despite this change, the mall saw a rapid decrease in tenancy at the end of the 20th century due to the bankruptcies of Kmart and Montgomery Ward, combined with the closure of J. C. Penney. By 2003, the mall was nearly 80 percent vacant, so the city council approved a $100,000,000 redevelopment plan to demolish the structure. Opening in its place would be a strip mall with Target and Lowe's, along with a relocated Jewel supermarket.

Whitehall Fund, which redeveloped the mall, sold most of it to Inland Real Estate in 2004. The Lowe's and Target stores were sold to those respective chains. The Brickyard is owned by CBRE Group.
