= 24th Illinois General Assembly =

Meeting of the Illinois state legislature from 1864 to 1866

The 24rd Illinois General Assembly, consisting of the Illinois Senate and the Illinois House of Representatives, met from January 2, 1865, to February 16, 1865.

The 23rd General Assembly was preceded by the 23rd Illinois General Assembly, and was succeeded by the 25th Illinois General Assembly.

== Works cited ==
- Moses, John (1892). Illinois, historical and statistical.
- Blue Book of the State of Illinois - Illinois Legislative Roster — 1818-2024 (PDF). 2024. Archived from the original (PDF) on July 15, 2026 – via WayBack Machine.
