= Riis Park (Chicago) =

- Riis, Jacob A., Park
- U.S. National Register of Historic Places
- U.S. Historic district
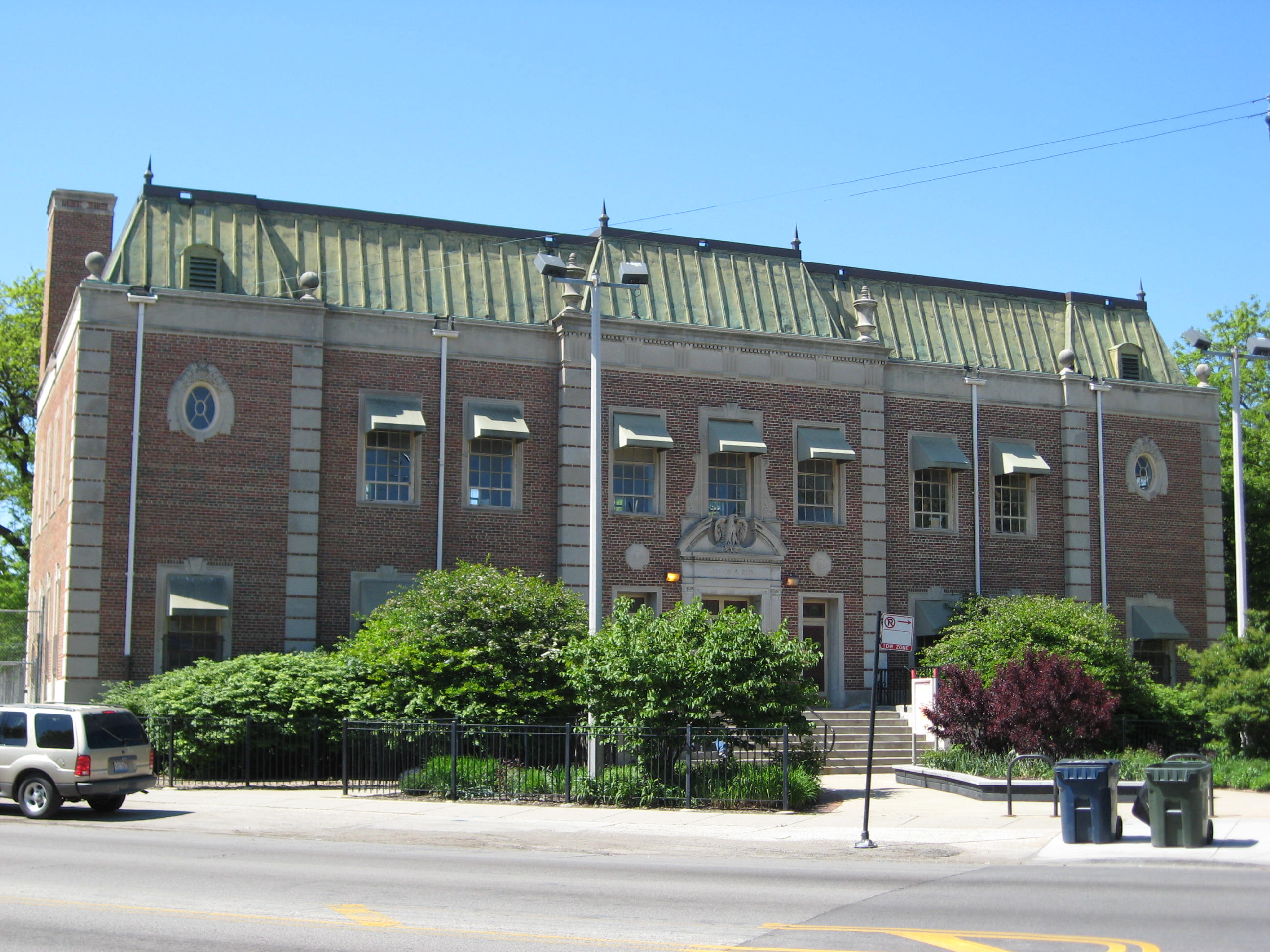
- The park's fieldhouse

- Location within Chicago metropolitan area Location within Illinois Location within the United States
- Location: 6100 W. Fullerton Ave., Chicago, Illinois
- Coordinates: 41°55′33″N 87°46′44″W
- Area: 56.8 acres (23.0 ha)
- MPS: Chicago Park District MPS
- NRHP reference No.: 95000483
- Added to NRHP: April 20, 1995

Riis Park is a park on Chicago's Northwest Side in the Belmont-Cragin neighborhood. The park covers 56 acres in a rectangle bounded by Fullerton Avenue to the south, Narragansett Avenue to the west, Wrightwood Avenue to the north, and Meade Avenue to the east.

The park is named after Jacob Riis, the New York City muckraker journalist and photographer who documented the plight of the poor and working class. A stone dedicated in Riis's honor in 1929 by Swedish citizens of Chicago can be found in the southwest corner of the park.

== History ==
The Northwest Park District acquired the property in 1916, inspired in part by a park-building movement that Riis had helped drive. The park's development took another decade, until 1928 when a ski jump and golf course were installed. Chicago architect Walter W. Ahlschlager designed the fieldhouse. In 1934, Riis Park became a part of the Chicago Park District after the consolidation of 22 park districts around the city.

The park was added to the National Register of Historic Places in 1995 and the National Register Information System ID is 95000483.
