= Belmont Cragin, Chicago =

Community area in Chicago, Illinois

Belmont Cragin
- Community area
- Community Area 19 - Belmont Cragin
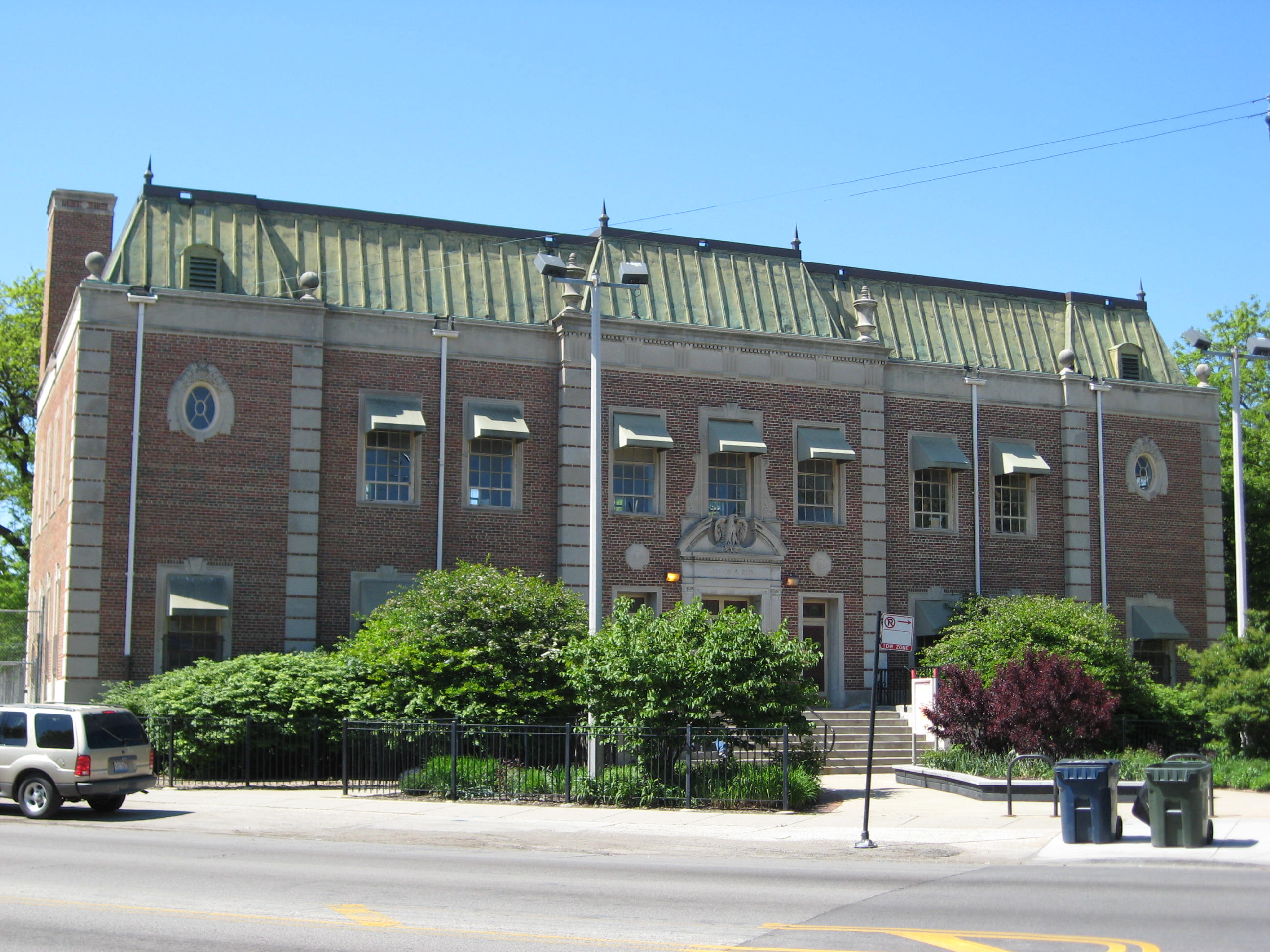
- Jacob A. Riis Park Fieldhouse

- Location within the city of Chicago
- Coordinates: 41°55.8′N 87°45.6′W
- Country: United States
- State: Illinois
- County: Cook
- City: Chicago
- Neighborhoods: List: Belmont Central; Cragin; Hanson Park; Kelvyn Park; Hermosa; Galewood; Montclare

Area
  - Total: 3.94 sq mi (10.20 km^{2})

Population (2024)
  - Total: 72,088
  - Density: 18,300/sq mi (7,067/km^{2})

Demographics 2024
  - White: 13.0%
  - Black: 3.9%
  - Hispanic: 78.1%
  - Asian: 3.4%
  - Other: 1.6%
- Time zone: UTC-6 (CST)
  - Summer (DST): UTC-5 (CDT)
- ZIP Codes: parts of 60634, 60639, 60641, and 60707
- Median household income 2022: $62,476
- Source: Chicago Metropolitan Agency for Planning

Belmont Cragin is one of the 77 community areas of Chicago in Illinois, United States, located on the Northwest Side of Chicago. It is designated Community Area 19, and is located 8 miles (13 km) northwest of the Loop. Surrounding community areas include: Portage Park, Hermosa, Austin, Montclare, Dunning.

== History ==
=== Beginnings ===
The first business to open in Belmont Cragin was a saloon opened by George Merrill sometime after 1835, when he settled with his family at the intersection of Armitage and Grand Avenues. Operating the saloon out of his home, Merrill catered to truck farmers carrying produce over the plank road to the city. The corner, named Whiskey Point, prompted many colorful and romanticized legends but attracted few permanent residents.

In 1862, Michael Moran established a hotel at Whiskey Point, but the area remained rural until 20 years later, when Cragin Brothers & Company moved their tin plate and sheet iron processing plant near Whiskey Point. The plant and warehouses covered 11 acres (45,000 m^{2}), and the Chicago, Milwaukee & St. Paul Railroad built a station at Leclaire Avenue to accommodate all the employees. The station closed in 2006, replaced by the Grand-Cicero station on Metra's Milwaukee District/West Line. Cragin also purchased a rivet company and moved machinery and workers from Connecticut to the location. Job opportunities and rail service brought settlers and a housing boom to the town, now named Cragin. Within two years, Cragin's population was 200, and the community boasted a general store, two schoolhouses, and a Congregational church. The area rests on prairie and a ridge that was formed by a glacier. It was settled by farmers before the population took off from residents leaving Chicago for better living conditions and new factories in the area. Belmont-Cragin was eventually annexed by the City of Chicago.

=== Industrialization and development ===
Railroads drew more factories and workers to the area, which was annexed into Chicago as part of Jefferson Township in 1889. The Belt Railway Company extended its service into the area in 1883, and plants developed in the new neighborhoods of Hanson Park and Galewood. In the same year, the Washburn and Moen Manufacturing Company launched a branch for its wire products, and the Western Brick and Tile Company found Galewood's superior clay soil conducive to business. By 1891, Westinghouse, Church, Kerr & Company Iron Works, the Pitts Agricultural Works Warehouse, and the Rice and Bullen Malting Company brought more people into Cragin.

In 1922 W. F. Hall Printing Company erected a plant on 17 acres (69,000 m^{2}) adjacent to the Northwestern railroad line, which further spurred manufacturing development. Swedish, German, and Irish workers were among the earliest to move near these factories. By 1920, these jobs drew Poles and Italians as well, and the population of the area more than quadrupled in the next decade. By 1930 the population escalated to 60,221, one-third foreign-born. In the 1930s, the community area became known as Belmont Cragin. Other companies came to the area too including Zenith (TV and electronics), and Ecco (cooking ware). Builders inundated the area to fill the housing needs of area workers. Bungalows, Cape Cods, and two-flats offered a range of housing type choices. Especially popular was the subdivided residential neighborhood on the eastern border named Belmont Park.

=== 1940s through the present day ===
During the postwar years, until the 1990s, mostly descendants of Europeans, mostly already assimilated second, third and fourth generation German, Greek, Irish, Italian, Polish, and Scandinavians had populated the area. The area was heavily dominated by both Catholic and Lutheran churches and schools.

In the 1920s a retail shopping district began to develop along Belmont Avenue, known as Belmont Central. It eventually drew in retailers that once included Goldblatt's Department Store, Woolworth's, Walgreens, Ben Franklin, SS Kresge's — later becoming K-mart in the Brickyard mall, JC Penney — also moving to the Brickyard Mall, IHOP restaurant, and Will Rodgers movie theatre. Children's playgrounds were built. Riis Park was once as a golf course and later became a park designed by Alfred Caldwell with a field house by architect Walter W. Ahlschlager. The Chicago Transit Authority in the 1940s extended its Belmont Street electric bus service beyond Central, transporting new patrons into the shopping district. Gas buses arrived in the 1970s.

==== Brickyard Shopping Center ====
In March 1977, the opening of the Brickyard Shopping Mall on the former site of the Carey Brickyard property at Narragansett and Diversey added new vitality to the community, drawing city and suburban shoppers away from Belmont Central shopping district, Six Corners, suburbs and downtown. A 1981 addition of a nearby parking garage continued to contribute to business prosperity but the area had seen its days since the opening of the Brickyard Mall. The original Brickyard Mall was an enclosed three-level building but was demolished in 2003 to pave way for big box stores including Target and Lowe's, along with the strip mall making it more automobile friendly rather than pedestrian friendly. Jewel Osco was originally in the location of Target in the old mall floor plan that once included Montgomery Ward and JC Penney department stores and K-mart.

==== Other Businesses ====
Until the early 1980s, Central Soya and its silos were located south of Grand Ave on Laramie; In 1943, Revere Copper opened a war material plant where Grand Ave. meets Fullerton Ave. From 1953 to 1963, Western Electric assembled mobile radar units in this structure and erected a tall concrete test stand at the corner of Fullerton and Normandy. Glidden paint was located just south of the train station on the 1800 block of North LeClaire Ave until the early 1980s. Cragin Department Store, located on the 4900 block of West Armitage, was a family-owned clothing and shoe store until the 1980s. Hawthorn Melody Dairy was located at Grand and Laramie. Reda's Liquors and Lizzi's House of Pizza were also located in the area. Dominick's grocery store was located on Central Ave. at Altgeld St. before the company was sold off and closed down. Tony's grocery store now anchors this location.

Belmont Cragin's overall population grew by more than 6 percent in the 1980s and 37 percent in the 1990s. The Hispanic population grew from 3,072 in 1980 to 16,846 in 1990. By the 2000 Census, the area was 65 percent Hispanic, joining the Polish immigrants and businesses who had come to the area earlier. A number of young middle-class professionals joined blue-collar laborers in the area. Residents formed an active coalition called the Northwest Neighborhood Federation to address increases in crime, gangs, and school overpopulation.

By 1995, Hall Printing and other plants had closed their doors. The area experienced a drop in manufacturing employment and a decline in retail activity during the 1980s. Concerns over unemployment and an increasing poverty level have led residents to organize a home reinvestment campaign and to study ways of reviving the commercial climate in the area.

== Neighborhoods ==
The Belmont-Cragin community area comprises four neighborhoods: Belmont Central, Brickyard, Cragin, Hanson Park.

== Education ==
Per the 2024 CMAP report, higher education attainment percentages have increased.

Levels of Educational Attainment
Level	2008-2012 Percent	2018-2022 Percent
High School Diploma or Equivalent	31.0	30.0
Some College, No Degree	15.3	17.7
Associate degree	5.7	7.1
Bachelor's degree	7.7	11.2
Graduate or Professional Degree	3.0	4.9

Chicago Public Schools operates district public schools.

Elementary and middle schools serving Belmont Cragin:

- Acero-Clemente
- Barry
- Belmont-Cragin
- Burbank
- Camras
- CICS-West Belden
- Falconer
- Hanson Park
- ITW
- Lloyd
- Locke
- Lyon
- Northwest Middle
- Prieto
- Schubert

High schools in the area are Steinmetz High School, Prosser Career Academy, and Foreman High School. A small portion of Belmont-Cragin is assigned to Schurz High School, located in the Irving Park neighborhood.

The Catholic Archdiocese of Chicago operates many parish churches, grade schools and St. Patrick High School within the district. The Notre Dame High School for Girls closed its doors in 2016.

There are 2 Chicago Public Library branches serving Belmont-Cragin

- The Portage-Cragin Branch first opened in a storefront in 1927, with a permanent library opening on Belmont Avenue on November 1, 1969.
- The West Belmont Branch serves the western division of Belmont Central at 3104 N. Narragansett Ave. This location opened on October 30, 1971.

Historical population
Census	Pop.	Note	%±
1930	60,221		—
1940	63,302		5.1%
1950	63,546		0.4%
1960	60,883		−4.2%
1970	57,288		−5.9%
1980	53,371		−6.8%
1990	56,787		6.4%
2000	78,237		37.8%
2010	81,448		4.1%
2020	78,116		−4.1%

== Politics ==
The Belmont-Cragin community has supported the Democratic Party in the past two presidential elections by large margins. In the 2016 presidential election, Belmont Cragin cast 15,403 votes for Hillary Clinton and cast 2,376 votes for Donald Trump (83.90% to 12.94%). In the 2012 presidential election, Belmont Cragin cast 12,398 votes for Barack Obama and cast 2,079 votes for Mitt Romney (84.75% to 14.21%).
