= 19th Illinois General Assembly =

Meeting of the Illinois state legislature from 1854 to 1856

The 19th Illinois General Assembly, consisting of the Illinois Senate and the Illinois House of Representatives, met from January 1, 1855, to February 15, 1855.

The 19th General Assembly was preceded by the 18th Illinois General Assembly, and was succeeded by the 20th Illinois General Assembly.

The Constitution of 1852, maintained the Senate at twenty-five members and the House at seventy-five members while increasing the House from 54 to 58 districts.

== Works cited ==
- Moses, John (1892). Illinois, historical and statistical.
- Blue Book of the State of Illinois. 1919.
- Blue Book of the State of Illinois - Illinois Legislative Roster — 1818-2024 (PDF). 2024. Archived from the original (PDF) on July 15, 2026.
