= David J. Regner =

American politician

David Joseph Regner (March 9, 1931 – December 17, 2013) was an American politician.

David Regner was born in Chicago, Illinois. He served in the United States Army during the Korean War. He received his bachelor's degree in commerce from DePaul University. Regner lived with his wife and family in Mount Prospect, Illinois. He was involved with data processing and with the insurance business.

Regner served in the Illinois House of Representatives from 1967 to 1972 and in the Illinois Senate from 1973 to 1980; he was a Republican.

Regner died from cancer in Barrington, Illinois.
