= George E. Dolezal =

American politician and judge

George E. Dolezal (November 8, 1919 – June 10, 1990) was an American judge and politician.

Born in Chicago, Illinois, Dolezal lived in Berwyn, Illinois and went to the Berwyn public schools. He served in the United States Army during World War II. Dolezal graduated from DePaul University and John Marshall Law School. He practiced law in Berwyn. He served on the Berwyn City Council from 1953 to 1956. Dolezal served in the Illinois House of Representatives from 1957 to 1965. He then served as the first Republican mayor of Berwyn from 1965 to 1968. Dolezal was elected to the Illinois Circuit Court for Cook County, Illinois. After retiring from the circuit court, Dolezal moved to Duck Key, Florida. He served on the Monroe County, Florida Board of Commissioners and was president of the county board. Dolezal died at his home in Murphy, North Carolina.
