= 22nd Illinois General Assembly =

Meeting of the Illinois state legislature from 1860 to 1862

The 22nd Illinois General Assembly, consisting of the Illinois Senate and the Illinois House of Representatives, met from January 7, 1861, to February 22, 1861 (1st session); and from April 23, 1861, to May 3, 1861 (2nd session).

The 22nd General Assembly was preceded by the 21st Illinois General Assembly, and was succeeded by the 23rd Illinois General Assembly.

== Senate ==
District	Jurisdiction(s) represented	Image	Senator	Remarks
1	Cook County		William B. Ogden	
2	Lake County		Henry W. Blodgett	
3	Ogle County		Zenas Aplington	Killed at the Siege of Corinth before his term was complete
4	Stephenson County		John H. Addams	
5	Lee County		Richard F. Adams	
6	Kankakee County		Alonzo W. Mack	
7	LaSalle County		Washington Bushnell	
8	Peoria County		George C. Bester	
9	Rock Island County		Thomas J. Pickett	
10	McDonough County		William Berry	
11	Schuyler County		John P. Richmond	
12	Adams County		Austin Brooks	Resigned January 18, 1861; reelected January 29, 1861
13	Pike County		Chauncey L. Higbee	
14	Jersey County		Anthony L. Knapp	
15	Sangamon County		William Jayne	
16	Macon County		Richard J. Oglesby	
17	Cass County		Harry E. Dummer	
18	Coles County		Thomas A. Marshall	
19	Effingham County		Presley Funkhouser	
20	Jefferson County		Zadok Casey	
21	Madison County		Samuel A. Buckmaster	
22	St. Clair County		William H. Underwood	
23	Williamson County		Hugh Gregg	
24	Clinton County		James M. Rodgers	
25	Johnson County		Andrew J. Kuykendall	

== Works cited ==
- Moses, John (1892). Illinois, historical and statistical.
- Blue Book of the State of Illinois. 1919.
- Blue Book of the State of Illinois - Illinois Legislative Roster — 1818-2024 (PDF). 2024. Archived from the original (PDF) on July 15, 2026 – via WayBack Machine.
