= Simons Park =

Park in Chicago, Illinois

Simons (Almira) Park
- Interactive map of Simons (Almira) Park
- Type: Municipal
- Location: Chicago, Cook County, Illinois
- Coordinates: 41°54′41″N 87°42′55″W
- Area: 1.18 acres (0.48 ha)
- Created: 1920
- Operator: Chicago Park District
- Status: Open all year

Simons (Almira) Park is a 1.18-acre municipal park at 1640 N. Drake Avenue in the Humboldt Park community of West Side, Chicago, Illinois.

Operated by the Chicago Park District, the park has a fieldhouse with a gymnasium, assembly hall, kitchen and clubrooms. Other facilities include basketball and volleyball courts, a boxing gym, a playground and a spray feature.

== History ==
The park honors local resident Almira Simons Winkleman, daughter of early settlers Edward Simons and Laura Sprague Simons. Beginning in 1836, her parents farmed the land now bordered by Armitage Avenue, North Avenue, Central Park Avenue and Kedzie Avenue. Winkleman's two daughters suggested naming the park for their mother while the park was being developed after World War I.

The Fullerton Avenue Business Men's Association proposed a neighborhood park in 1916, but no action was taken until after the war. The Northwest Park District began acquiring land in 1920 and completed the park's expansion in 1928. That year, it built a red-brick, Second Empire-style fieldhouse designed by Walter W. Ahlschlager. In 1934, the park became part of the Chicago Park District when the Northwest Park District and 21 other park commissions were consolidated into it. The fieldhouse was remodeled in 1990. It was renovated in the early 2000s.

In 2014, the playground was rebuilt with new equipment through the citywide Chicago Plays! program.

=== Simon City Royals ===
A 2008 Milwaukee Police Department account described the Simon City Royals as having originated in the mid-1960s in the area around the park.
