= Luis Arroyo (American politician) =

American politician

Member of the Illinois House of Representatives from the 3rd district
- In office December 2006 – November 1, 2019
- Preceded by: William Delgado
- Succeeded by: Eva-Dina Delgado

Personal details
- Born: June 13, 1954 (age 72) Corozal, Puerto Rico
- Party: Democratic
- Spouse: Maribel
- Children: 3

Luis Arroyo (born June 13, 1954) is a former Democratic member of the Illinois House of Representatives, representing the 3rd District from his appointment in 2006 until his resignation in 2019.

== Early life and education ==
Arroyo was born in Corozal, Puerto Rico, moving to Chicago at age 13. He attended Pulaski Elementary School and Tuley High School (now Roberto Clemente Community Academy) in Chicago. Before being appointed to the state legislature, Arroyo owned a restaurant and was a member of the International Union of Bricklayers and Allied Craftworkers.

== Career ==
Arroyo was appointed as Illinois State Representative for the 3rd district in 2006. He was re-elected six times, running unopposed in the primary and general elections in four election cycles. From 2017 onwards, Arroyo served as Assistant Majority Leader in the Illinois House of Representatives.

In late October 2019, the US Attorney's Office charged Arroyo with one count of federal program bribery, alleging that Arroyo offered "a bribe to a fellow state lawmaker in an effort to influence and reward the lawmaker for supporting legislation that would benefit Arroyo’s private lobbying client". Arroyo announced his resignation on November 1, shortly before a legislative committee was scheduled to meet to consider ejecting him from the state house after being arrested for bribery.

On November 15, 2019, Eva-Dina Delgado was appointed to serve the remainder of Arroyo's term. The appointment was controversial as Arroyo also served as 36th Ward committeeman and thus received votes in the appointment process. Despite calls to abstain from the process, he allowed neighboring 30th Ward committeeman Ariel Reboyras to act as his proxy, receiving criticism from several other political figures including 35th Ward alderman and committeeman Carlos Ramirez-Rosa and Illinois House Speaker Michael Madigan.

== Conviction and imprisonment ==
On November 3, 2021, Arroyo pled guilty to the federal wire fraud charge related to involvement in a bribery scheme and was sentenced in May 2022 to 57 months in prison. This prison sentence for Arroyo would be upheld in July 2023, with Arroyo, who served his sentence at a minimum security prison in Pensacola, Florida, would later be released in May 2026.

== Personal life ==
His son, Luis Arroyo Jr., was a member of the Cook County Board of Commissioners until losing his seat in 2022.

== Electoral history ==
Illinois 3rd State House District Democratic Primary, 2008
Party	Candidate	Votes	%
Democratic	Luis Arroyo (incumbent)	8,920	82.16
Democratic	Francisco "Frankie" Rodriguez	1,937	17.84
Total votes		10,857	100.0

Illinois 3rd State House District General Election, 2008
Party	Candidate	Votes	%
Democratic	Luis Arroyo (incumbent)	16,881	100.0
Total votes		16,881	100.0

Illinois 3rd State House District General Election, 2010
Party	Candidate	Votes	%
Democratic	Luis Arroyo (incumbent)	9,363	100.0
Total votes		9,363	100.0

Illinois 3rd State House District General Election, 2012
Party	Candidate	Votes	%
Democratic	Luis Arroyo (incumbent)	19,636	100.0
Total votes		19,636	100.0

Illinois 3rd State House District Democratic Primary, 2014
Party	Candidate	Votes	%
Democratic	Luis Arroyo (incumbent)	3,262	99.79
Democratic	Enid Martinez-Gonzales	7	0.21
Total votes		3,269	100.0

Illinois 3rd State House District General Election, 2014
Party	Candidate	Votes	%
Democratic	Luis Arroyo (incumbent)	11,948	100.0
Total votes		11,948	100.0

Illinois 3rd State House District General Election, 2016
Party	Candidate	Votes	%
Democratic	Luis Arroyo (incumbent)	24,178	100.0
Total votes		24,178	100.0

Illinois 3rd State House District General Election, 2018
Party	Candidate	Votes	%
Democratic	Luis Arroyo (incumbent)	19,782	100.0
Total votes		19,782	100.0
