= 21st Illinois General Assembly =

Meeting of the Illinois state legislature from 1858 to 1860

The 21st Illinois General Assembly, consisting of the Illinois Senate and the Illinois House of Representatives, met from January 3, 1859, to February 24, 1859.

The 21st General Assembly was preceded by the 20th Illinois General Assembly, and was succeeded by the 22nd Illinois General Assembly.

== Senate ==
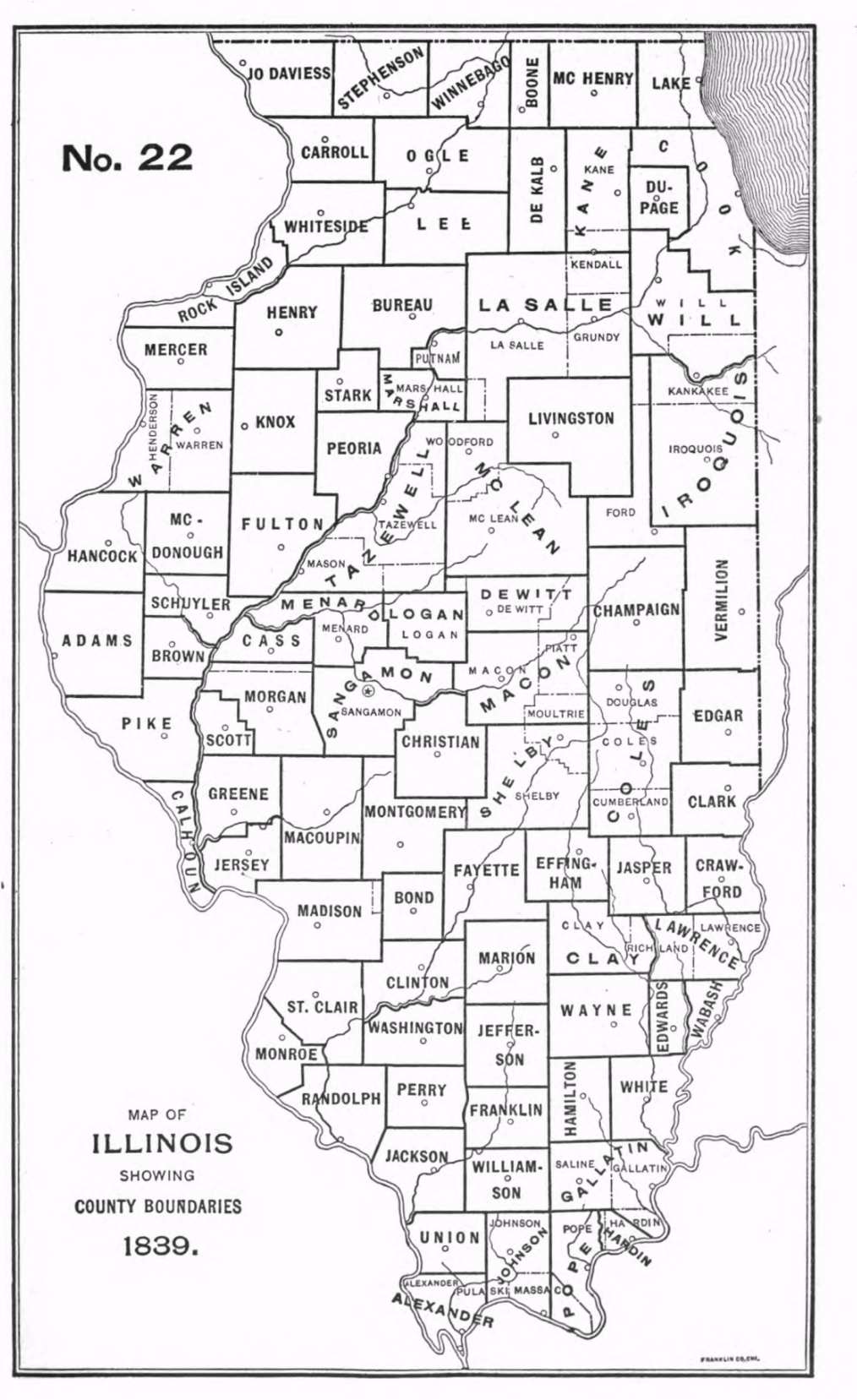
Map of Illinois county boundaries effective 1839 and in effect during the 21st General Assembly

District	Jurisdiction(s) represented	Image	Senator	Remarks
1	Cook County		Norman B. Judd	
2	Lake County		Henry W. Blodgett	
3	Ogle County		Zenas Aplington	
4	Stephenson County		John H. Addams	
5	Lee County		Richard F. Adams	
6	Will County		G. D. A. Parks	
7	LaSalle County		Burton C. Cook	
8	Peoria County		George C. Bester	
9	Stark County		Thomas J. Henderson	
10	Fulton County		William C. Goudy	
11	Schuyler County		John P. Richmond	
12	Adams County		Austin Brooks	
13	Pike County		Chauncey L. Higbee	
14	Jersey County		Anthony L. Knapp	
15	Sangamon County		Cyrus W. Vanderen	
16	Macon County		Joel S. Post	
17	Tazewell County		Samuel W. Fuller	
18	Coles County		Thomas A. Marshall	
19	Jasper County		Mortimer O'Kean	
20	Marion County		Silas L. Bryan	
21	Madison County		Samuel A. Buckmaster	
22	St. Clair County		William H. Underwood	
23	White County		Samuel H. Martin	
24	Washington County		E. C. Coffey	
25	Johnson County		Andrew J. Kuykendall	

== Works cited ==
- Moses, John (1892). Illinois, historical and statistical.
- Blue Book of the State of Illinois. 1919.
- Blue Book of the State of Illinois - Illinois Legislative Roster — 1818-2024 (PDF). 2024. Archived from the original (PDF) on July 15, 2026.
