= Eugene Schlickman =

American politician (1929–2014)

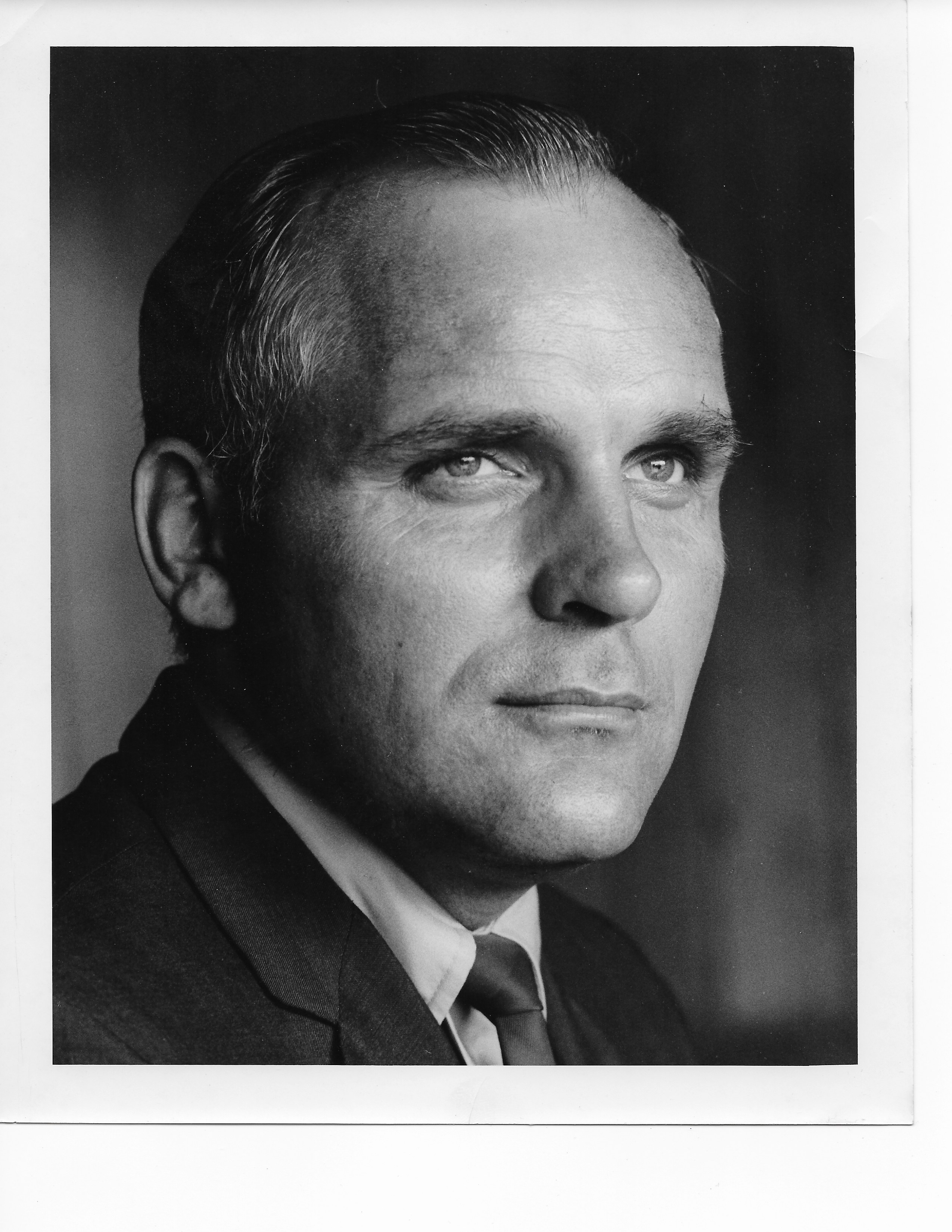
- Eugene F. Schlickman circa 1969

Member of the Illinois House of Representatives
- In office 1964–1980

Personal details
- Born: December 17, 1929 Dubuque, Iowa, U.S.
- Died: January 23, 2014 (aged 84) Michigan City, Indiana, U.S.
- Party: Republican
- Education: Loras College; Georgetown University Law Center

Eugene F. Schlickman (December 17, 1929 – January 23, 2014) was an American politician. As a member of the Republican Party, he served in the Illinois House of Representatives from 1964 to 1980. Born in Dubuque, Iowa, to Leander and Helen Schlickman (née Juergens), he died in Michigan City, Indiana in 2014.

== Childhood and education ==
While living with his parents in Dubuque, Schlickman attended public school kindergarten and St. Mary Catholic Parish grade school until the 3rd grade. His father hauled gravel for the construction industry. In 1937, his family moved to Davenport, Iowa where Leander was employed by Montgomery Ward to haul ice boxes and furniture. In 1940 the family moved to Rockford, Illinois where Helen and Leander started in their home basement a diaper cleaning business (the Tydee Dydee Diaper Service). Schlickman attended St. Patrick Parish grade school until the 5th grade and graduated from the St. James Pro-Cathedral grade school. For high school he attended St. Thomas Academy for one year in Rockford and for his sophomore year transferred to a Catholic seminary in Geneva. Schlickman transferred back to St. Thomas for his junior and senior years, graduating in 1947. He graduated from Dubuque Iowa's Loras College in 1951, majoring in economics. He graduated from Georgetown University Law School in 1956.

== Professional and legal career ==
During law school in Washington, D.C., Schlickman worked for the U.S. Department of Labor as a statistical clerk and then for Corn Industries Research Foundation as an assistant to the Vice President. After moving back to Illinois in 1956, he became the research director for the National Foundry Association in Chicago. Subsequently he worked for Ekco Products Co. as a labor relations executive. In 1964 Schlickman left Ekco to practice law. Schlickman was admitted to the practice of law in the District of Columbia (1956) and Illinois (1959). He was a member of the American, Illinois, Chicago, and Northwest Suburban Bar Associations. Schlickman went into partnership with Nat Burfeind and formed the law firm, Burfeind and Schlickman, Ltd., (circa 1965) located in Arlington Heights, Illinois. Schlickman's practice focused on real estate, estate planning, domestic relations, business formation, and miscellaneous other matters generated by his suburban based clientele.

== Political career ==
=== Arlington Heights, Illinois Village Board ===
He was elected a trustee on the Arlington Heights, Illinois, Village Board and served two terms, from 1959 to 1967. After his first year on the board, he received the Jaycee Distinguished Service Award.

=== Illinois General Assembly ===
In the 1964, Schlickman was elected to the Illinois General Assembly House of Representatives. It was a landside year for Democrats, electing the party's full 118 House candidate slate, with only 59 Republicans, including Schlickman, achieving office.

==== Awards ====
For his first legislative term, Rutgers University chose him as one of two outstanding legislators from the Illinois 74th General Assembly. Other awards received by Schlickman during his 16 years as member of the Illinois House of Representative include: John Howard Association Award for legislative efforts in the field of rehabilitation of criminal offenders, 1967; Village of Des Plaines, Illinois Chamber of Commerce and Industry for political courage to stand alone on a vital issue of principle against friend and foe, 1976; Outstanding Legislator Award for outstanding support to Independent Higher Education, 1977; Suburban Townships Association Award of Appreciation for dedicated service to people with mental disabilities,1978.

==== Legislative Study Commissions ====
In 1971 Schlickman chaired two study commissions established by the Illinois Legislature, the Zoning Laws Study Commission and the Elementary and Secondary Nonpublic Schools Study Commission.

==== Legislative Advisory Committee ====
In 1971, Schlickman chaired the Legislative Advisory Committee to the Northeastern Illinois Planning Commission.

==== Legislative Accomplishments ====
Upon the announcement of his retirement from the Illinois General Assembly in 1979, the Arlington Heights Daily Herald newspaper acknowledge Schlickman's following legislative accomplishments: "He worked hard for the expansion and modernization of Illinois state parks. He fought shoddy home construction. … He saw the need for zoning-law reform and for regional planning. Although he favored regionally provided mass transit, Schlickman opposed specific legislation creating the Regional Transportation Authority…[He] championed state aid to parochial schools until decisions by the Illinois Supreme Court and the US Supreme Court quashed parochiaid legislation…In 1973, his bold challenge of dictatorial leadership in the Illinois House led to more open, more representative government. Perhaps most indicative of Schlickman’s passion for clean government was his well-publicized charge in 1976 against the Democratic Majority Leader of conflict of interest…[The] allegations led to new disciplinary rules for unethical behavior by legislators.”

== Author ==
Schlickman is a co-author, with Bill Barnhart, of two books, "Kerner: The Conflicts of Intangible Rights" (Urbana: University of Illinois Press, 1999) and "John Paul Stevens: An Independent Life, (Dekalb, Northern Illinois University Press, 2010).
