= 20th Illinois General Assembly =

Meeting of the Illinois state legislature from 1856 to 1858

The 20th Illinois General Assembly, consisting of the Illinois Senate and the Illinois House of Representatives, met from January 5, 1857, to February 19, 1857.

The 20th General Assembly was preceded by the 19th Illinois General Assembly, and was succeeded by the 21st Illinois General Assembly.

== Works cited ==
- Moses, John (1892). Illinois, historical and statistical.
- Blue Book of the State of Illinois. 1919.
- Blue Book of the State of Illinois - Illinois Legislative Roster — 1818-2024 (PDF). 2024. Archived from the original (PDF) on July 15, 2026.
