= Walter W. Ahlschlager =

American architect

Walter William Ahlschlager
- Born: July 19, 1887; Chicago, Illinois, U.S.
- Died: March 28, 1965 (aged 77); Dallas, Texas
- Education: Lewis Institute, Armour Institute, Art Institute of Chicago
- Occupation: Architect
- Spouse: Jennie Ahlschlager
- Children: Walter Ahlschlager Junior

Walter William Ahlschlager (July 19, 1887 – March 28, 1965) was a 20th-century American architect. After living in Chicago for many years, he established an office in Dallas in 1940. He died on March 28, 1965 in Dallas.

== Noted designs ==
- Davis Theater, Chicago (1918)
- Sovereign Hotel, Edgewater, Chicago on the North Side of the city (1920)
- Sheridan Plaza Hotel, Uptown Chicago (1921)
- Peabody Hotel, Memphis, Tennessee (1926)
- Uptown Broadway Building, Uptown Chicago (1926)
- The fieldhouses at several Chicago public parks including Riis Park, Simons Park and Kelvyn Park
- Roxy Theatre, New York City (1927)
- Irvin Cobb Hotel, Paducah, Kentucky (1929)
- Medinah Athletic Club (now InterContinental Chicago), Chicago (1929)
- Beacon Hotel and Theatre, Manhattan, New York (1929)
- Carew Tower, Cincinnati, Ohio (1930)
- City Place Tower, Oklahoma City, Oklahoma (1931)
- Mercantile National Bank Building, Dallas (1943)
- Wichita Plaza Building, Wichita, Kansas (1962)
- The Wedgwood in Castle Hills, Texas, an enclave city southwest of New Braunfels (1965)

== Personal life ==
Ahlschlager was born to John and Louise Ahlschlager, German Jews, and had one sister named Ella. John Ahlschlager and his brother, Frederick, were both prominent architects in Chicago.
