= Edwin Reyes (American politician) =

American politician & police officer

Member of the Cook County Board of Commissioners from the 8th district
- In office 2009 – 2014
- Preceded by: Roberto Maldonado
- Succeeded by: Luis Arroyo Jr.

Personal details
- Born: Chicago, Illinois
- Party: Democratic
- Spouse: Iris De Jesus
- Children: Naya and Mia Reyes
- Education: Northeastern Illinois University
- Occupation: State trooper

Edwin Reyes is an American politician who served as Cook County Commissioner for the 8th district, in northwest Chicago. He held the position as a Democrat from 2009–2014.

== Education ==
Reyes attended Northern Illinois University in the early 1980s. He then served on active duty in the United States Air Force from 1983 to 1986. In 1996, he earned a bachelor's degree in liberal arts from Northeastern Illinois University.

== Political career ==
Reyes served as Chief of Staff for Chicago Alderman Rey Colón from 2003–2004. From 2006–2009, Reyes served as a state trooper on the security detail for governor Rod Blagojevich.

== County Commissioner ==
One of Reyes' first official votes as commissioner was to override John Stroger's veto of a sales tax cut in 2009. During the 2010 election, Reyes listed his top three priorities as healthcare access, violence prevention, and educational resources. The Chicago Tribune declined to endorse him that year, reporting that "Reyes answers to the men who sent him, Democratic bosses Dick Mell and Joseph Berrios."

In 2013, Reyes supported a $25 tax on gun sales proposed by Toni Preckwinkle. Reyes chaired the committees on veterans and law enforcement.
