= 23rd Illinois General Assembly =

Meeting of the Illinois state legislature from 1862 to 1864

The 23rd Illinois General Assembly, consisting of the Illinois Senate and the Illinois House of Representatives, met from January 5, 1863, to February 14, 1863 (1st session); and after being prorogued by the Governor, June 10, 1863, until Dec. 31, 1864; convened and adjourned Dec. 31, 1864 (2nd session).

The 23rd General Assembly was preceded by the 22nd Illinois General Assembly, and was succeeded by the 24th Illinois General Assembly.

== Works cited ==
- Moses, John (1892). Illinois, historical and statistical.
- Blue Book of the State of Illinois. 1919.
- Blue Book of the State of Illinois - Illinois Legislative Roster — 1818-2024 (PDF). 2024. Archived from the original (PDF) on July 15, 2026 – via WayBack Machine.
