= William Delgado =

American politician

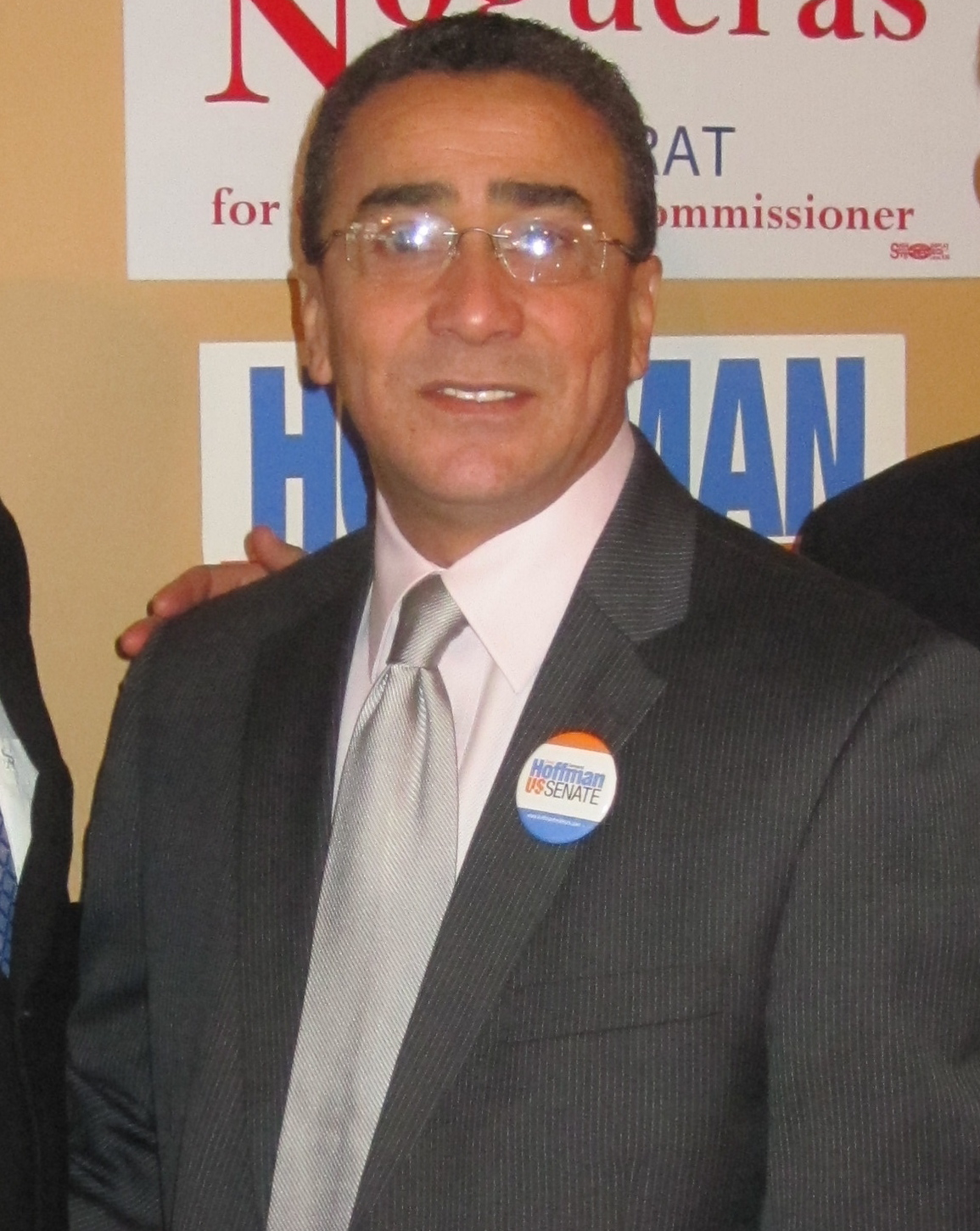
- Delgado in 2010

Member of the Illinois Senate from the 2nd district
- In office December 2, 2006 – June 30, 2016
- Preceded by: Miguel del Valle
- Succeeded by: Omar Aquino

Member of the Illinois House of Representatives from the 3rd district
- In office 1999–2006
- Preceded by: Elba Iris Rodriguez
- Succeeded by: Luis Arroyo

Personal details
- Born: October 31, 1956 (age 69) Newark, New Jersey, U.S.
- Party: Democratic
- Spouse: Iris Delgado
- Children: 2
- Education: Northeastern Illinois University
- Profession: Social Services Worker

William "Willie" Delgado (born October 31, 1956) is a former Democratic member of the Illinois Senate, representing the 2nd district from 2006 until June 2016. He was first elected in 2006, replacing Miguel del Valle, who was elected Chicago City Clerk. Previously, Delgado served in the Illinois House of Representatives from 1999 to 2006 and was replaced by Luis Arroyo.

On January 5, 2015, Delgado announced that he would not be seeking re-election to the Illinois Senate. He retired from the seat effective June 30, 2016.

== Early life ==
Delgado was born in Newark, New Jersey but was raised in Chicago. He graduated from Tilden High School and Northeastern Illinois University, where he earned his bachelor's degree in Criminal Justice, with a minor in Sociology.

Upon graduation, he married his high school sweetheart Iris Santiago. They have two children.

== Public service ==
Delgado began his career coordinating youth programs for the West Town YMCA, the Mayor's Office of Summer Employment and Training and the Association House of Chicago. With each of these organizations, Delgado's main responsibility was youth outreach. He later served as a Youth and Family Counselor, then as Probation and Parole Officer in Miami, Florida. When he returned to Chicago, he continued his community service at the Department of Children and Family Services.

Delgado was active in statewide politics as well. He served as Hispanic Liaison for former Attorney General Roland Burris and Latino Liaison during the 1994 campaign of gubernatorial candidate Dawn Clark Netsch. While with Attorney General Burris, Delgado organized and implemented the "Gun Turn in Day" program, which led to the removal of more than 142 illegal firearms from the streets of Chicago.

The five years prior to his election as representative, Delgado worked as Director of Community Services for State Senator Miguel del Valle.

Delgado was endorsed by the Chicago Democratic Socialists of America in 1996 as a member of The New Party and candidate to win the Democratic ballot line for the Illinois House of Representatives in the 3rd District on the West Side of Chicago. He was endorsed due to his longtime standing as a community activist with an academic background in criminal justice and social work.

== State representative ==
Delgado was first elected in 1998. Delgado's top legislative priorities are education reform, economic development, and crime prevention. He is working to develop school safety initiatives to keep drugs and guns out of local classrooms. Delgado also supports reducing class sizes, improving classroom discipline, and increasing state support for school construction grant funding. Delgado also highlights his work as "champion of health and physical fitness issues." He has sponsored legislation to see that physical fitness is emphasized in schools statewide.

Representative Delgado serves on seven committees: Appropriations for Elementary and Secondary Education; Fee for Service Initiatives; Human Services; Judiciary II- Criminal Law; KidCare; Managing Sex Offender Issues; and Registration and Regulation.

== State senator ==
William Delgado was appointed Illinois State Senator, by the former State Senator Miguel del Valle. Del Valle was appointed as City Clerk of Chicago by Mayor Richard M. Daley.

== Post-legislative career ==
On October 18, 2023, Governor J.B. Pritzker nominated Delgado to the Illinois Prison Review Board. Delgado was confirmed by the Illinois Senate to a term starting September 5, 2023 and ending on January 18, 2027.
