= Illinois's 13th Senate district =

American legislative district

Coordinates: 41°45′N 87°35′W

Illinois's 13th State Senate district
- The 13th district since 2023.
Senator
Robert Peters; D–Chicago
- Demographics: 23.5% White; 55.0% Black; 12.8% Hispanic; 9.0% Asian; 1.7% Native American; 0.2% Hawaiian/Pacific Islander
- Population (2020) • Voting age • Citizens of voting age: 217,228; 180,325; 153,965

Illinois’ 13th Senate district is one of 59 districts in the Illinois Senate. The seat stretches along the southern shoreline of Lake Michigan, from Chicago’s Magnificent Mile to the Indiana border. The seat is home to several Chicago landmarks, including Navy Pier, Millennium Park, Grant Park, the Field Museum of Natural History, the Shedd Aquarium, Soldier Field, the Museum of Science and Industry, and the University of Chicago. Neighborhoods located within its boundaries include Streeterville and the South Side communities of Kenwood, Hyde Park, and South Chicago.

The 13th district is home to 119,000 Black residents, who comprise a majority of the seat’s 217,000 total inhabitants. In recent years, this has made the seat a launching pad for several Black elected officials in Illinois. Notable examples include former President Barack Obama, who springboarded from this seat to the U.S. Senate in 2004, and state Attorney General Kwame Raoul, who represented the district from 2004 to 2019.

Democrats have held this seat with ease for more than six decades. In 2020, Joe Biden (who spent eight years as Obama’s vice president) carried it by an 89%-10% margin over Donald Trump.

== Legislative district history ==
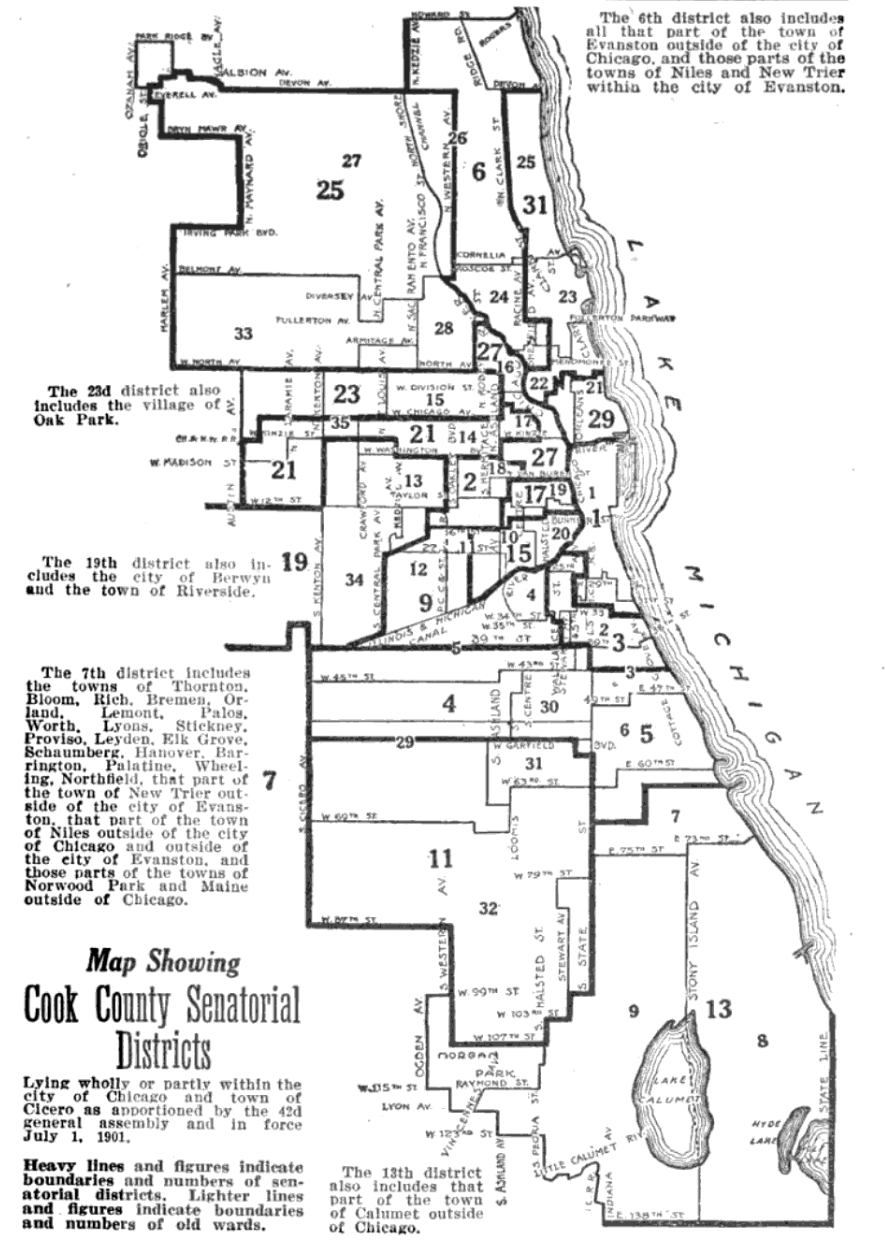
Senate districts in Cook County as they were apportioned (without change) from 1901-1955

Prior to the ratification of the 1848 Illinois Constitution, counties (or two or more counties) were designated a certain number of Senators and Representatives. With the ratification of the 1848 Illinois Constitution, Legislative and Representative districts were numbered and called by name. Each district was still assigned a certain number of Senators and Representatives. After the passage of the 1872 Apportionment, only Legislative districts were drawn with Representatives elected cumulatively. The 1954 amendment to the 1870 Illinois Constitution established Representative districts as separate from Legislative districts (with representatives still elected cumulatively). The boundaries of Representative and Legislative districts would differ. After the United States Supreme Court ruled in Reynolds v. Sims (1964) that "both houses of state legislatures must be apportioned according to districts of equal population," new districts were redrawn for the Illinois Senate and Illinois House of Representatives. While the Legislative districts were redrawn, the Governor and General Assembly failed to agree on Representative district boundaries. Under the 1954 amendment, "a 10-man bipartisan commission appointed by the governor from recommendations made by both parties" were directed to redraw boundaries but failed to do so in 1963. Because of this failure, and with no district boundaries redrawn, all Representative districts were temporarily merged into one at-large district with 177 representatives (the total number of representatives at the time). The 1964 Illinois House election had several candidates running for all 177 seats throughout the state. In 1965, the Representative districts were redrawn by the Illinois Legislative Reapportionment Commission and elections held in 1966 were done with separate districts. With the 1971 Apportionment (and adoption of the 1970 Illinois Constitution), Representative districts were abolished and representatives were once again elected cumulatively per Legislative district. After the passage of the Cutback Amendment in 1980, the number of Representatives was reduced from 177 to 118 with Representative districts re-established and now electing a single representative.

== Prominent legislators ==
=== Senators ===
Senator	Notes
John M. Palmer	Served as a Major General during the American Civil War (1861–1866); Appointed Military Governor of Kentucky (1865–1866); Elected the 15th Governor of Illinois (1869–1873); Elected to the U.S. Senate from Illinois (1891–1897); National Democratic Party nominee in the 1896 United States presidential election
Dawn Clark Netsch	Elected the 4th Illinois Comptroller (1991–1995); Democratic Party nominee in the 1994 Illinois gubernatorial election
Richard H. Newhouse Jr.	First African American person to run for Mayor of Chicago in the 1975 Chicago mayoral election
Barack Obama	Elected to the U.S. Senate from Illinois (2005–2008); Elected the 44th President of the United States (2009–2017)
Kwame Raoul	Elected the 42nd Illinois Attorney General (2019–present)

=== Representatives ===
Representative	Notes
Lyman Beecher Ray	Elected the 25th Lieutenant Governor of Illinois (1889–1893)
Seymour Stedman	Vice-Presidential candidate for the Socialist Party of America during the 1920 United States presidential election
Gotthard A. Dahlberg	Served as the 46th Speaker of the Illinois House (1921–1923)
Stanley H. Kunz	Elected to the U.S. House of Representatives from Illinois's 8th congressional district (1921–1931); Elected back to the U.S. House of Representatives from Illinois's 8th congressional district (1932–1933)
James Herbert Wilkerson	Appointed Judge of the United States District Court for the Northern District of Illinois (1922–1948)
Elmer Jacob Schnackenberg	Appointed Judge of the United States Court of Appeals for the Seventh Circuit (1953–1968)
Jesse White	Served as the 37th Illinois Secretary of State (1999–2023)

== List of senators ==
=== 1849 – 1871 ===
Senator	Party	Years (Note: From 1870 to 1970, the GA met for a new session on the Wednesday after the first Monday of January.)	General Assembly (GA)	Electoral history	Counties represented
Franklin Witt	Democratic	January 1, 1849 – ???	16th	Elected in 1848; Left the 17th General Assembly at an unknown time.	Calhoun; Greene; Jersey; Macoupin
Franklin Witt	Democratic	January 1, 1849 – ???	17th	Elected in 1848; Left the 17th General Assembly at an unknown time.	Calhoun; Greene; Jersey; Macoupin
John M. Palmer	Democratic	??? – January 1, 1855	17th	Served in the 17th GA; Redistricted to the 14th Legislative district and re-elected in 1854.	Calhoun; Greene; Jersey; Macoupin
John M. Palmer	Democratic	??? – January 1, 1855	18th	Served in the 17th GA; Redistricted to the 14th Legislative district and re-elected in 1854.	Calhoun; Greene; Jersey; Macoupin
Hugh L. Sutphin	Democratic	January 1, 1855 – January 3, 1859	19th 20th	Elected in 1854; Was not re-elected in 1858.	Calhoun; Pike; Scott
Chauncey L. Higbee	Democratic	January 3, 1859 – January 5, 1863	21st 22nd	Elected in 1858; Was not re-elected in 1862.	Calhoun; Pike; Scott
Bryant T. Schofield	Democratic	January 5, 1863 – January 7, 1867	23rd 24th	Elected in 1862; Was not re-elected in 1866.	Adams; Hancock
Samuel R. Chittenden	Democratic	January 7, 1867 – January 4, 1871	25th 26th	Elected in 1866; Was not re-elected in 1870.	Adams; Hancock
Apportionment of 1870 gave the district two senators to elect cumulatively.					Adams; Hancock

=== 1871 – 1873 ===
Senator	Party	Party Control	Years	General Assembly (GA)	Electoral history	Counties represented
Apportionment of 1870 gave the district two senators to elect cumulatively.
James H. Richardson	Democratic	2 Democrats	January 4, 1871 – January 8, 1873	27th	Elected in 1870; Was not re-elected in 1872.	Adams; Hancock
Jesse C. Williams	Democratic	2 Democrats	January 4, 1871 – January 8, 1873	27th	Elected in 1870; Was not re-elected in 1872.	Adams; Hancock
Apportionment of 1872 now gives the district one senator and three representatives to elect.

=== 1873–present ===
Senator	Party	Years (Note: Since 1970, the GA meets on the second Wednesday of January for a new session.)	General Assembly (GA)	Electoral history	Counties represented
Apportionment of 1872 now gives the district one senator and three representatives to elect.
Miles B. Castle	Republican	January 8, 1873 – January 8, 1879	28th 29th 30th	Elected in 1872; Re-elected in 1874; Was not re-elected in 1878.	DeKalb; Grundy; Kendall
John R. Marshall	Republican	January 8, 1879 – January 3, 1883	31st 32nd	Elected in 1878; Was not re-elected in 1882.	DeKalb; Grundy; Kendall
Millard B. Hereley	Democratic	January 3, 1883 – January 5, 1887	33rd 34th	Elected in 1882; Was not re-elected in 1886.	Cook
Michael F. Garrity	Republican	January 5, 1887 – January 7, 1891	35th 36th	Elected in 1886; Lost re-election in 1890.	Cook
John F. O'Malley	Democratic	January 7, 1891 – January 2, 1895	37th 38th	Elected in 1890; Was not re-elected in 1894.	Cook
Joseph P. Mahoney	Democratic	January 2, 1895 – January 7, 1903	39th 40th 41st 42nd	Redistricted from the 5th Legislative district and re-elected in 1894; Re-elected in 1898; Was not re-elected in 1902.	Cook
Albert C. Clark	Republican	January 7, 1903 – January 6, 1915	43rd 44th 45th 46th 47th 48th	Elected in 1902; Re-elected in 1906; Re-elected in 1910; Retired.	Cook
John A. Swanson	Republican	January 6, 1915 – 1917	49th	Elected in 1914; Resigned to become a judge in 1917.	Cook
John A. Swanson	Republican	January 6, 1915 – 1917	50th	Elected in 1914; Resigned to become a judge in 1917.	Cook
Vacant		1917 – April 1917	50th		Cook
Albert C. Clark	Republican	April 1917 – January 5, 1927	50th 51st 52nd 53rd 54th	Elected back in 1917 special election Re-elected in 1918; Re-elected in 1922; Retired.	Cook
Harry W. Starr	Republican	January 5, 1927 – January 7, 1931	55th 56th	Elected in 1926; Lost re-election in 1930.	Cook
Francis J. Loughran	Democratic	January 7, 1931 – January 6, 1943	57th 58th 59th 60th 61st 62nd	Elected in 1930; Re-elected in 1934; Re-elected in 1938; Lost re-election in 1942.	Cook
Walker Butler	Republican	January 6, 1943 – 1953/1954	63rd 64th 65th 66th 67th 68th	Elected in 1942; Re-elected in 1946; Re-elected in 1950; Resigned after being elected a judge of the Superior Court of Cook County in 1953.	Cook
Vacant		1953/1954 – January 5, 1955	68th		Cook
Daniel Dougherty	Democratic	January 5, 1955 – January 4, 1967	69th 70th 71st 72nd 73rd 74th	Elected in 1954; Re-elected in 1958; Re-elected in 1962; Re-districted to the 30th Legislative district and re-elected in 1966.	Cook
James P. Loukas	Democratic	January 4, 1967 – January 13, 1971	75th 76th	Elected in 1966; Retired.	Cook
Ben E. Palmer	Democratic	January 13, 1971 – January 10, 1973	77th	Elected in 1970; Redistricted to the 12th Legislative district and re-elected in 1972.	Cook
Dawn Clark Netsch	Democratic	January 10, 1973 – January 12, 1983	78th 79th 80th 81st 82nd	Elected in 1972; Re-elected in 1974; Re-elected in 1978; Redistricted to the 4th Legislative district and re-elected in 1982.	Cook
Richard H. Newhouse Jr.	Democratic	January 12, 1983 – May 29, 1991	83rd 84th 85th 86th 87th	Redistricted from the 24th Legislative district and re-elected in 1982; Re-elected in 1984; Re-elected in 1988; Resigned in 1991.	Cook
Vacant		May 29, 1991 – June 6, 1991	87th		Cook
Alice Palmer	Democratic	June 6, 1991 – January 8, 1997	87th 88th 89th	Appointed in 1991; Elected in 1992; Failed to qualify for nomination and lost renomination in 1996.	Cook
Barack Obama	Democratic	January 8, 1997 – November 4, 2004	90th 91st 92nd 93rd	Elected in 1996; Re-elected in 1998; Re-elected in 2002; Elected U.S. Senator from Illinois and resigned his state senate seat in 2004.	Cook
Vacant		November 4, 2004 – November 6, 2004	93rd		Cook
Kwame Raoul	Democratic	November 6, 2004 – January 5, 2019	93rd 94th 95th 96th 97th 98th 99th 100th	Appointed in 2004; Elected in 2006; Re-elected in 2010; Re-elected in 2012; Re-elected in 2016; Elected Illinois Attorney General in 2018.	Cook
Vacant		January 5, 2019 – January 6, 2019	100th		Cook
Robert Peters	Democratic	January 6, 2019 – present	100th 101st	Appointed in 2019; Elected in 2020	Cook

== Senator election results ==
=== 2020 – 2012 ===
2020 Illinois Senate election
Party	Candidate	Votes	%
Democratic	Robert Peters (incumbent)	79,024	100.0
Total votes		79,024	100.0

2016 Illinois Senate election
Party	Candidate	Votes	%
Democratic	Kwame Raoul (incumbent)	78,792	100.0
Total votes		78,792	100.0

2012 Illinois Senate election
Party	Candidate	Votes	%
Democratic	Kwame Raoul (incumbent)	74,295	100.0
Total votes		74,295	100.0

=== 2010 – 2002 ===
2010 Illinois Senate election
Party	Candidate	Votes	%	±%
Democratic	Kwame Raoul (incumbent)	52,254	100.0	+10.37%
Total votes		52,254	100.0	

2006 Illinois Senate election
Party	Candidate	Votes	%	±%
Democratic	Kwame Raoul (incumbent)	49,616	89.63	−10.37
Republican	Charles Kinzer	5,743	10.37	N/A
Total votes		55,359	100.0	

2002 Illinois Senate election
Party	Candidate	Votes	%	±%
Democratic	Barack Obama (incumbent)	48,717	100.0	+10.83%
Total votes		48,717	100.0	

=== 2000 – 1992 ===
1998 Illinois Senate election
Party	Candidate	Votes	%	±%
Democratic	Barack Obama (incumbent)	45,486	89.17	+7.01%
Republican	Yesse B. Yehudah	5,526	10.83	+5.60%
Total votes		51,012	100.0	

1996 Illinois Senate election
Party	Candidate	Votes	%	±%
Democratic	Barack Obama	48,592	82.16	−17.84%
Harold Washington	David Whitehead	7,461	12.61	N/A
Republican	Rosette Caldwell Peyton	3,091	5.23	N/A
Total votes		59,144	100.0	

1992 Illinois Senate election
Party	Candidate	Votes	%
Democratic	Alice J. Palmer (incumbent)	69,989	100.0
Total votes		69,989	100.0

=== 1990 – 1982 ===
1988 Illinois Senate election
Party	Candidate	Votes	%
Democratic	Richard H. Newhouse Jr. (incumbent)	64,328	100.0
Total votes		64,328	100.0

1984 Illinois Senate election
Party	Candidate	Votes	%	±%
Democratic	Richard H. Newhouse Jr. (incumbent)	66,427	100.0	+0.01%
Write-in		3	0.00	-0.01%
Total votes		66,430	100.0	

1982 Illinois Senate election
Party	Candidate	Votes	%	±%
Democratic	Richard H. Newhouse Jr.	61,158	99.99	+28.62%
Write-in		9	0.01	N/A
Total votes		61,167	100.0	

=== 1980 – 1972 ===
1978 Illinois Senate election
Party	Candidate	Votes	%	±%
Democratic	Dawn Clark Netsch (incumbent)	33,583	71.37	−7.19%
Republican	Robert K. Hall	13,470	28.63	+7.19%
Total votes		47,053	100.0	

1974 Illinois Senate election
Party	Candidate	Votes	%	±%
Democratic	Dawn Clark Netsch (incumbent)	35,057	78.56	+11.07%
Republican	Walter K. Pyle	9,569	21.44	−10.96%
Total votes		44,626	100.0	

1972 Illinois Senate election
Party	Candidate	Votes	%	±%
Democratic	Dawn Clark Netsch	49,899	67.49	+4.76%
Republican	Donald Frank Schroud	23,954	32.40	−4.87%
Write-in		87	0.12	N/A
Total votes		73,940	100.0	

=== 1970 – 1962 ===
1970 Illinois Senate election
Party	Candidate	Votes	%	±%
Democratic	Ben E. Palmer	35,554	62.73	+10.20%
Republican	Alon Jeffrey	21,127	37.27	−10.20%
Total votes		56,681	100.0	

1966 Illinois Senate election
Party	Candidate	Votes	%	±%
Democratic	James P. Loukas	35,540	52.53	−9.44%
Republican	Irma S. Levin	32,114	47.47	+9.44%
Total votes		67,654	100.0	

1962 Illinois Senate election
Party	Candidate	Votes	%	±%
Democratic	Daniel Dougherty (incumbent)	20,521	61.97	−14.54%
Republican	Edwin W. Smolik	12,591	38.03	+14.54%
Total votes		33,112	100.0	

=== 1960 – 1952 ===
1958 Illinois Senate election
Party	Candidate	Votes	%	±%
Democratic	Daniel Dougherty (incumbent)	22,679	76.51	+24.50%
Republican	Loretta Dunlop	6,964	23.49	−24.50%
Total votes		29,643	100.0	

1954 Illinois Senate election
Party	Candidate	Votes	%	±%
Democratic	Daniel Dougherty	83,433	52.01	+8.35%
Republican	Nicholas J. Bouling	76,979	47.99	−8.35%
Total votes		160,412	100.0	

=== 1950 – 1942 ===
1950 Illinois Senate election
Party	Candidate	Votes	%	±%
Republican	Walker Butler (incumbent)	102,321	56.34	+0.41%
Democratic	Daniel Dougherty	79,277	43.66	−0.41%
Total votes		181,598	100.0	

1946 Illinois Senate election
Party	Candidate	Votes	%	±%
Republican	Walker Butler (incumbent)	109,098	55.93	+4.74%
Democratic	Frank J. (Spike) McAdams	85,973	44.07	−4.74%
Total votes		195,071	100.0	

1942 Illinois Senate election
Party	Candidate	Votes	%	±%
Republican	Walker Butler	71,568	51.19	+4.04%
Democratic	Francis J. Loughran (incumbent)	68,241	48.81	−4.04%
Total votes		139,809	100.0	

=== 1940 – 1932 ===
1938 Illinois Senate election
Party	Candidate	Votes	%	±%
Democratic	Francis J. Loughran (incumbent)	77,631	52.85	−4.41%
Republican	Grenville Beardsley	69,256	47.15	+5.53%
Total votes		146,887	100.0	

1934 Illinois Senate election
Party	Candidate	Votes	%	±%
Democratic	Francis J. Loughran (incumbent)	65,811	57.26	−0.42%
Republican	Grenville Beardsley	47,841	41.62	−0.59%
Independent	H. W. Reed	900	0.78	N/A
Independent	Joseph R. Burda	384	0.33	N/A
Total votes		114,936	100.0	

=== 1930 – 1922 ===
1930 Illinois Senate election
Party	Candidate	Votes	%	±%
Democratic	Francis J. Loughran	51,158	57.68	+13.48%
Republican	Harry W. Starr (incumbent)	37,437	42.21	−13.36%
Independent	John Edward Saff	94	0.11	N/A
Total votes		88,689	100.0	

1926 Illinois Senate election
Party	Candidate	Votes	%	±%
Republican	Harry W. Starr	36,606	55.57	+2.28%
Democratic	John Prystalski	29,117	44.20	+1.97%
Progressive Party (United States, 1924–34)	John C. Flora	147	0.22	N/A
Total votes		65,870	100.0	

1922 Illinois Senate election
Party	Candidate	Votes	%	±%
Republican	Albert C. Clark (incumbent)	28,544	53.29	+0.10%
Democratic	John W. Riley	22,621	42.23	+1.26%
Socialist	George Kohler	2,403	4.49	−1.36%
Total votes		53,568	100.0	

=== 1920 – 1912 ===
1918 Illinois Senate election
Party	Candidate	Votes	%	±%
Republican	Albert C. Clark (incumbent)	15,827	53.19	+11.80%
Democratic	James J. Mulcahey	12,191	40.97	+5.53%
Socialist	Zephiere Pepin	1,740	5.85	−3.99%
Total votes		29,758	100.0	

1914 Illinois Senate election
Party	Candidate	Votes	%	±%
Republican	John A. Swanson	9,555	41.39	−1.01%
Democratic	John W. Riley	8,183	35.44	−3.75%
Progressive	Cecil C. Erickson	3,078	13.33	N/A
Socialist	Charles V. Johnson	2,271	9.84	+0.47%
Total votes		23,087	100.0	

=== 1910 – 1902 ===
1910 Illinois Senate election
Party	Candidate	Votes	%	±%
Republican	Albert C. Clark (incumbent)	9,358	42.40	−6.88%
Democratic	James Kirby	8,649	39.19	+14.75%
Socialist	Nels Anderson	2,069	9.37	−3.44%
Independent Republican	Frank E. Paulson	1,537	6.96	N/A
Prohibition	Perry Kim	458	2.08	N/A
Total votes		22,071	100.0	

1906 Illinois Senate election
Party	Candidate	Votes	%	±%
Republican	Albert C. Clark (incumbent)	9,123	49.28	−2.88%
Democratic	William H. Suffield	4,525	24.44	−9.21%
Socialist	Matt Whalen	2,372	12.81	+1.01%
Independence	Frank E. Campbell	2,170	11.72	N/A
Independent	John C. Grantham	324	1.75	N/A
Total votes		18,514	100.0	

1902 Illinois Senate election
Party	Candidate	Votes	%	±%
Republican	Albert C. Clark	8,996	52.16	N/A
Democratic	W. R. Bowes	5,803	33.65	−13.55%
Socialist	T. J. Vind	2,036	11.80	N/A
Prohibition	Robert Johns	321	1.86	N/A
Single Tax	John M. Bryen	91	0.53	N/A
Total votes		17,247	100.0	

=== 1900 – 1892 ===
1898 Illinois Senate election
Party	Candidate	Votes	%
Democratic	Joseph P. Mahoney (Note: Listed as "Jas. P. Mahoney")	5,873	47.20
Unknown	William J. Cooke	5,771	46.38
Unknown	John Pecha	798	6.41
Total votes		12,442	100.0

=== 1890 – 1882 ===
1886 Illinois Senate election
Party	Candidate	Votes	%
Unknown	Michael F. Garrity	2,296	38.27
Democratic	John F. O'Malley (Note: Listed as J. F. O'Malley)	2,086	34.77
Unknown	M. Lucie	1,617	26.95
Total votes		5,999	100.0

1882 Illinois Senate election
Party	Candidate	Votes	%
Unknown	Millard B. Hereley (Note: Listed as "W. B. Hereley")	3,514	58.44
Unknown	Peter Kiolbassa	2,416	40.18
Unknown	John Fossell	83	1.38
Total votes		6,013	100.0

=== 1880 – 1872 ===
1878 Illinois Senate election
Party	Candidate	Votes	%
Unknown	John R. Marshall	5,088	56.70
Unknown	Chauncey Ellwood	3,883	43.27
Unknown	—— Wells	2	0.02
Total votes		8,973	100.0

== Historical list of representatives ==
=== 1873 – 1957 ===
Representative	Party	Party Control	Years	General Assembly (GA)	Electoral history	Counties represented
Apportionment of 1872 now gives the district one senator and three representatives to elect.
Perry A. Armstrong	Democratic	2 Republicans; 1 Democrat	January 8, 1873 – January 6, 1875	28th	Elected in 1872; Was not re-elected in 1874.	DeKalb; Grundy; Kendall
George M. Hollenback	Republican	2 Republicans; 1 Democrat	January 8, 1873 – January 6, 1875	28th	Elected in 1872; Was not re-elected in 1874.	DeKalb; Grundy; Kendall
Lyman Beecher Ray	Republican	2 Republicans; 1 Democrat	January 8, 1873 – January 6, 1875	28th	Elected in 1872; Was not re-elected in 1874.	DeKalb; Grundy; Kendall
D. B. Bailey	Republican	2 Independents; 1 Republican	January 6, 1875 – January 3, 1877	29th	Elected in 1874; Was not re-elected in 1876.	DeKalb; Grundy; Kendall
Philip Collins	Independent	2 Independents; 1 Republican	January 6, 1875 – January 3, 1877	29th	Elected in 1874; Was not re-elected in 1876.	DeKalb; Grundy; Kendall
Joshua McGrath	Independent	2 Independents; 1 Republican	January 6, 1875 – January 3, 1877	29th	Elected in 1874; Was not re-elected in 1876.	DeKalb; Grundy; Kendall
William M. Byers	Republican	2 Republicans; 1 Democrat	January 3, 1877 – January 5, 1881	30th 31st	Elected in 1876; Re-elected in 1878; Was not re-elected in 1880.	DeKalb; Grundy; Kendall
Amos D. Clover	Democratic	2 Republicans; 1 Democrat	January 3, 1877 – January 8, 1879	30th	Elected in 1876; Was not re-elected in 1878.	DeKalb; Grundy; Kendall
Peter S. Lott	Republican	2 Republicans; 1 Democrat	January 3, 1877 – January 8, 1879	30th	Elected in 1876; Was not re-elected in 1878.	DeKalb; Grundy; Kendall
Robert M. Brigham	Republican	2 Republicans; 1 Greenback	January 8, 1879 – January 5, 1881	31st	Elected in 1878; Was not re-elected in 1880.	DeKalb; Grundy; Kendall
Alonzo B. Smith	Greenback	2 Republicans; 1 Greenback	January 8, 1879 – January 5, 1881	31st	Elected in 1878; Was not re-elected in 1880.	DeKalb; Grundy; Kendall
John C. Clark	Democratic	2 Republicans; 1 Democrat	January 5, 1881 – January 3, 1883 (Note: One of these four representatives left the 32nd GA at an unknown time with one of these four appointed or elected to fill the vacancy.)	32nd	Served during the 32nd GA; Was not re-elected in 1882.	DeKalb; Grundy; Kendall
Hiram Loucks	Republican	2 Republicans; 1 Democrat	January 5, 1881 – January 3, 1883	32nd	Served during the 32nd GA; Was not re-elected in 1882.	DeKalb; Grundy; Kendall
Henry Wood	Republican	2 Republicans; 1 Democrat	January 5, 1881 – January 3, 1883	32nd	Served during the 32nd GA; Redistricted to the 17th Legislative district and re-elected in 1882.	DeKalb; Grundy; Kendall
Benton F. Kleeman	Unknown	Unknown	January 5, 1881 – January 3, 1883	32nd	Served during the 32nd GA; Was not re-elected in 1882.	DeKalb; Grundy; Kendall
John F. Dugan	Democratic	2 Democrats; 1 Republican	January 3, 1883 – January 7, 1885	33rd	Elected in 1882; Was not re-elected in 1884.	Cook
Gregory A. Klupp	Democratic	2 Democrats; 1 Republican	January 3, 1883 – January 7, 1885	33rd	Elected in 1882; Lost re-election.	Cook
Peter Sundelius	Republican	2 Democrats; 1 Republican	January 3, 1883 – January 5, 1887	33rd 34th	Elected in 1882; Re-elected in 1884; Was not re-elected in 1886.	Cook
Barney Brachtendorf	Democratic	2 Democrats; 1 Republican	January 7, 1885 – January 5, 1887	34th	Elected in 1884; Lost re-election.	Cook
Thomas F. Mulheran	Democratic	2 Democrats; 1 Republican	January 7, 1885 – January 5, 1887	34th	Elected in 1884; Was not re-elected in 1886.	Cook
Victor Carlowski	Socialist	1 Democrat; 1 Republican; 1 Socialist	January 5, 1887 – January 9, 1889	35th	Elected in 1886; Was not re-elected in 1888.	Cook
J. J. Furlong	Democratic	1 Democrat; 1 Republican; 1 Socialist	January 5, 1887 – January 9, 1889	35th	Elected in 1886; Was not re-elected in 1888.	Cook
Frank E. Schoenwald	Republican	1 Democrat; 1 Republican; 1 Socialist	January 5, 1887 – January 9, 1889	35th	Elected in 1886; Was not re-elected in 1888.	Cook
Stanley H. Kunz	Democratic	2 Democrats; 1 Republican	January 9, 1889 – January 7, 1891	36th	Elected in 1888; Was not re-elected in 1890.	Cook
William H. Lyman	Democratic	2 Democrats; 1 Republican	January 9, 1889 – January 4, 1893	36th 37th	Elected in 1888; Re-elected in 1890	Cook
Peter Sundelius	Republican	2 Democrats; 1 Republican	January 9, 1889 – January 7, 1891	36th	Elected back in 1888; Was not re-elected in 1890.	Cook
Samuel E. Erickson	Republican	2 Democrats; 1 Republican	January 7, 1891 – January 4, 1893	37th	Elected in 1890	Cook
John A. Kwasigroch	Democratic	2 Democrats; 1 Republican	January 7, 1891 – January 4, 1893	37th	Elected in 1890	Cook
Samuel E. Erickson	Republican	2 Democrats; 1 Republican	January 4, 1893 – January 9, 1895	38th	Re-elected in 1892; Was not re-elected in 1894.	Cook
John A. Kwasigroch	Democratic	2 Democrats; 1 Republican	January 4, 1893 – January 9, 1895	38th	Re-elected in 1892; Was not re-elected in 1894.	Cook
William H. Lyman	Democratic	2 Democrats; 1 Republican	January 4, 1893 – January 9, 1895	38th	Re-elected in 1892; Redistricted to the 23rd Legislative district and re-elected in 1894.	Cook
James P. Cavanagh	Republican	2 Democrats; 1 Republican	January 9, 1895 – January 7, 1903	39th 40th 41st 42nd	Elected in 1894; Re-elected in 1896; Re-elected in 1898; Re-elected in 1900; Redistricted to the 15th Legislative district and re-elected in 1902.	Cook
Edward J. Novak	Democratic	2 Democrats; 1 Republican	January 9, 1895 – January 4, 1899	39th 40th	Redistricted from the 5th Legislative district and re-elected in 1894; Re-elected in 1896; Was not re-elected in 1898.	Cook
Simon Shaffer	Democratic	2 Democrats; 1 Republican	January 9, 1895 – January 6, 1897	39th	Elected in 1894; Lost re-election in 1896.	Cook
William Carmody	Democratic	2 Democrats; 1 Republican	January 6, 1897 – January 7, 1903	40th 41st 42nd	Elected in 1896; Re-elected in 1898; Re-elected in 1900; Was not re-elected in 1902.	Cook
John Churan	Democratic	2 Democrats; 1 Republican	January 4, 1899 – January 9, 1901	41st	Elected in 1898; Was not re-elected in 1900.	Cook
Cyril R. Jandus	Democratic	2 Democrats; 1 Republican	January 9, 1901 – January 7, 1903	42nd	Elected in 1900; Elected state Senator from the 15th Legislative district in 1902.	Cook
Henry V. Meeteren	Democratic	2 Republicans; 1 Democrat	January 7, 1903 – January 4, 1905	43rd	Elected in 1902; Was not re-elected in 1904.	Cook
Benton F. Kleeman	Republican	2 Republicans; 1 Democrat	January 7, 1903 – January 9, 1907	43rd 44th	Elected in 1902; Re-elected in 1904; Was not re-elected in 1906.	Cook
James Herbert Wilkerson	Republican	2 Republicans; 1 Democrat	January 7, 1903 – January 4, 1905	43rd	Elected in 1902; Was not re-elected in 1904.	Cook
William T. Monroe	Republican	2 Republicans; 1 Democrat	January 4, 1905 – January 9, 1907	44th	Elected in 1904; Was not re-elected in 1906.	Cook
John J. Poulton	Democratic	2 Republicans; 1 Democrat	January 4, 1905 – January 4, 1911	44th 45th 46th	Elected in 1904; Re-elected in 1906; Re-elected in 1908; Was not re-elected in 1910.	Cook
Edward C. Fitch	Republican	2 Republicans; 1 Democrat	January 9, 1907 – January 6, 1909	45th	Elected in 1906; Was not re-elected in 1908.	Cook
Cornelius J. Ton	Republican	2 Republicans; 1 Democrat	January 9, 1907 – January 4, 1911	45th 46th	Elected in 1906; Re-elected in 1908; Was not re-elected in 1910.	Cook
Benton F. Kleeman	Republican	2 Republicans; 1 Democrat	January 6, 1909 – January 6, 1915	46th 47th 48th	Elected back in 1908; Re-elected in 1910; Re-elected in 1912; Was not re-elected in 1914.	Cook
John A. Swanson	Republican	2 Republicans; 1 Democrat	January 4, 1911 – January 8, 1913	47th	Elected in 1910; Lost re-election in 1912.	Cook
Timothy Dunne	Democratic	2 Republicans; 1 Democrat	January 4, 1911 – January 8, 1913	47th	Elected in 1910; Lost re-election in 1912.	Cook
Elmer Jacob Schnackenberg	Progressive	1 Progressive; 1 Republican; 1 Socialist	January 8, 1913 – January 6, 1915	48th	Elected in 1912; Was not re-elected in 1914.	Cook
Seymour Stedman	Socialist	1 Progressive; 1 Republican; 1 Socialist	January 8, 1913 – January 6, 1915	48th	Elected in 1912; Was not re-elected in 1914.	Cook
James W. Ryan	Democratic	2 Republicans; 1 Democrat	January 6, 1915 – January 3, 1923	49th 50th 51st 52nd	Elected in 1914; Re-elected in 1916; Re-elected in 1918; Re-elected in 1920; Was not re-elected in 1922.	Cook
Gotthard A. Dahlberg	Republican	2 Republicans; 1 Democrat	January 6, 1915 – January 7, 1925	49th 50th 51st 52nd 53rd	Elected in 1914; Re-elected in 1916; Re-elected in 1918; Re-elected in 1920; Re-elected in 1922; Was not re-elected in 1924.	Cook
C. A. Young	Republican	2 Republicans; 1 Democrat	January 6, 1915 – January 3, 1923	49th 50th 51st 52nd	Elected in 1914; Re-elected in 1916; Re-elected in 1918; Re-elected in 1920; Lost renomination in 1922.	Cook
William W. Powers	Democratic	2 Republicans; 1 Democrat	January 3, 1923 – January 4, 1939	53rd 54th 55th 56th 57th 58th 59th 60th	Elected in 1922; Re-elected in 1924; Re-elected in 1926; Re-elected in 1928; Re-elected in 1930; Re-elected in 1932; Re-elected in 1934; Re-elected in 1936; Retired.	Cook
Elmer Jacob Schnackenberg	Republican	2 Republicans; 1 Democrat	January 3, 1923 – January 3, 1945	53rd 54th 55th 56th 57th 58th 59th 60th 61st 62nd 63rd	Elected back in 1922; Re-elected in 1924; Re-elected in 1926; Re-elected in 1928; Re-elected in 1930; Re-elected in 1932; Re-elected in 1934; Re-elected in 1936; Re-elected in 1938; Re-elected in 1940; Re-elected in 1942; Retired.	Cook
Theo D. Smith	Republican	2 Republicans; 1 Democrat	January 7, 1925 – January 5, 1927	54th	Elected in 1924; Lost re-election in 1926.	Cook
John C. Garriott, Jr.	Democratic	2 Democrats; 1 Republican	January 5, 1927 – January 4, 1933	55th	Elected in 1926; Re-elected in 1928; Re-elected in 1930; Retired.	Cook
John C. Garriott, Jr.	Republican	2 Republicans; 1 Democrat	January 5, 1927 – January 4, 1933	56th 57th	Elected in 1926; Re-elected in 1928; Re-elected in 1930; Retired.	Cook
John G. Ryan	Democratic	2 Democrats; 1 Republican	January 4, 1933 – January 9, 1957	58th 59th 60th 61st 62nd 63rd 64th 65th 66th 67th 68th 69th	Elected in 1932; Re-elected in 1934; Re-elected in 1936; Re-elected in 1938; Re-elected in 1940; Re-elected in 1942; Re-elected in 1944; Re-elected in 1946; Re-elected in 1948; Re-elected in 1950; Re-elected in 1952; Re-elected in 1954; Redistricted to the 25th Representative district and re-elected in 1956.	Cook
Adam S. Mioduski	Democratic	2 Democrats; 1 Republican	January 4, 1939 – January 6, 1943	61st 62nd	Elected in 1938; Re-elected in 1940; Lost re-election.	Cook
Ragnar G. Nelson	Republican	2 Republicans; 1 Democrat	January 6, 1943 – January 5, 1949	63rd 64th 65th	Elected in 1942; Re-elected in 1944; Re-elected in 1946; Lost re-election.	Cook
Adam S. Mioduski	Democratic	2 Democrats; 1 Republican	January 3, 1945 – January 8, 1947	64th	Elected back in 1944; Lost re-election.	Cook
Edward Schneider	Republican	2 Republicans; 1 Democrat	January 8, 1947 – January 9, 1957	65th 66th 67th 68th 69th	Elected in 1946; Re-elected in 1948; Re-elected in 1950; Re-elected in 1952; Re-elected in 1954; Redistricted to the 25th Representative district and re-elected in 1956.	Cook
Adam S. Mioduski	Democratic	2 Democrats; 1 Republican	January 5, 1949 – January 3, 1951	66th	Elected back in 1948; Lost re-election.	Cook
Marie H. Suthers	Republican	2 Republicans; 1 Democrat	January 3, 1951 – January 7, 1953	67th	Elected in 1950; Lost re-election.	Cook
Henry M. Lenard	Democratic	2 Democrats; 1 Republican	January 7, 1953 – January 9, 1957	68th 69th	Elected in 1952; Re-elected in 1954; Redistricted to the 24th Representative district and re-elected in 1956.	Cook
Representative districts re-established in 1957

=== 1973 – 1983 ===
Representative	Party	Party Control	Years	General Assembly (GA)	Electoral history	Counties represented
Apportionment of 1971 reallocates three representatives to Legislative districts.
James Houlihan	Democratic	2 Democrats; 1 Republican	January 10, 1973 – January 10, 1979	78th 79th 80th	Elected in 1972; Re-elected in 1974; Re-elected in 1976; Lost renomination in 1978.	Cook
Robert L. Thompson	Democratic	2 Democrats; 1 Republican	January 10, 1973 – January 8, 1975	78th	Redistricted from the 12th Representative district and re-elected in 1972; Retired.	Cook
Paul J. Randolph	Republican	2 Democrats; 1 Republican	January 10, 1973 – January 12, 1977	78th 79th	Redistricted from the 12th Representative district and re-elected in 1972; Re-elected in 1974; Retired.	Cook
Jesse White	Democratic	2 Democrats; 1 Republican	January 8, 1975 – January 12, 1977	79th	Elected in 1974; Retired.	Cook
Daniel P. O'Brien	Democratic	2 Democrats; 1 Republican	January 12, 1977 – January 12, 1983	80th 81st 82nd	Elected in 1976; Re-elected in 1978; Re-elected in 1980; Retired.	Cook
Elroy C. Sandquist, Jr.	Republican	2 Democrats; 1 Republican	January 12, 1977 – January 12, 1983	80th 81st 82nd	Elected in 1976; Re-elected in 1978; Re-elected in 1980; Redistricted to the 8th Representative district and lost re-election.	Cook
Jesse White	Democratic	2 Democrats; 1 Republican	January 10, 1979 – January 12, 1983	81st 82nd	Elected back in 1978; Re-elected in 1980; Redistricted to the 8th Representative district and won re-election.	Cook
Representative districts re-established with approval of the Cutback Amendment.

== Representative election results ==
=== 1980 – 1972 ===
1980 Illinois House of Representatives election
Party	Candidate	Votes	%
Democratic	Daniel P. O'Brien (incumbent)	68,802	35.14
Democratic	Jesse C. White, Jr. (incumbent)	53,603	27.38
Republican	Elroy C. Sandquist, Jr. (incumbent)	41,877.5	21.39
Republican	Raymond H. Schumacher	24,408.5	12.47
Libertarian	Jim Peron	3,498.5	1.79
Libertarian	Celeste M. Webb	1,940.5	0.99
Libertarian	William W. Hall	1,663.5	0.85
Write-in		7	0.00
Total votes		195,800.5	100.0

1978 Illinois House of Representatives election
Party	Candidate	Votes	%
Democratic	Daniel P. O'Brien (incumbent)	45,721	34.00
Democratic	Jesse C. White, Jr.	38,905.5	28.93
Republican	Elroy C. Sandquist, Jr. (incumbent)	33,933	25.24
Republican	Raymond H. Schumacher	15,894.5	11.82
Write-in		11	0.01
Total votes		134,465	100.0

1978 Illinois House of Representatives Democratic primary
Party	Candidate	Votes	%
Democratic	Jesse C. White, Jr.	27,612	35.01
Democratic	Daniel P. O'Brien (incumbent)	25,291	32.07
Democratic	James M. Houlihan (incumbent)	20,112	25.50
Democratic	Gary Nepon	5,859	7.43
Total votes		78,874	100.0

1976 Illinois House of Representatives election
Party	Candidate	Votes	%
Democratic	Daniel P. O'Brien	62,032.5	30.27
Democratic	James M. Houlihan (incumbent)	54,444	26.57
Republican	Elroy C. Sandquist, Jr.	46,127	22.51
Republican	Tom (Thomas E.) McNamara	42,306.5	20.65
Write-in		2	0.00
Total votes		204,912	100.0

1974 Illinois House of Representatives election
Party	Candidate	Votes	%
Democratic	James M. Houlihan (incumbent)	53,844	41.41
Democratic	Jesse C. White, Jr.	34,851	26.80
Republican	Paul J. Randolph (incumbent)	22,702.5	17.46
Republican	Tom McNamara	18,625	14.32
Total votes		130,022.5	100.0

1972 Illinois House of Representatives election
Party	Candidate	Votes	%
Democratic	James M. Houlihan	90,286.5	42.77
Democratic	Robert L. Thompson	44,528	21.09
Republican	Paul J. Randolph	43,624	20.67
Republican	Hawley H. Stodder	32,641.5	15.46
Write-in		4	0.00
Total votes		211,084	100.0

=== 1954 – 1952 ===
1954 Illinois House of Representatives election
Party	Candidate	Votes	%
Democratic	John G. Ryan (incumbent)	135,139.5	28.52
Democratic	Henry M. Lenard (incumbent)	131,948	27.85
Republican	Edward Schneider (incumbent)	102,382.5	21.61
Republican	Armand Chiappori	101,217	21.36
Independent	Kelly J. Laphen	3,124	0.66
Total votes		473,811	100.0

1952 Illinois House of Representatives election
Party	Candidate	Votes	%
Democratic	Henry M. Lenard	168,245	25.55
Republican	Edward Schneider (incumbent)	167,407	25.42
Democratic	John G. Ryan (incumbent)	162,324	24.65
Republican	Marie H. Suthers (incumbent)	160,633.5	24.39
Total votes		658,609.5	100.0

=== 1950 – 1942 ===
1950 Illinois House of Representatives election
Party	Candidate	Votes	%
Republican	Edward Schneider (incumbent)	150,566.5	27.93
Republican	Marie H. Suthers	140,173.5	26.01
Democratic	John G. Ryan (incumbent)	125,660.5	23.31
Democratic	Adam S. Mioduski (incumbent)	122,572	22.74
Total votes		538,972.5	100.0

1948 Illinois House of Representatives election
Party	Candidate	Votes	%
Democratic	John G. Ryan (incumbent)	167,205.5	27.58
Democratic	Adam S. Mioduski	163,419	26.96
Republican	Edward Schneider (incumbent)	141,459.5	23.34
Republican	Ragnar G. Nelson (incumbent)	134,103.5	22.12
Total votes		606,187.5	100.0

1946 Illinois House of Representatives election
Party	Candidate	Votes	%
Republican	Edward Schneider	161,232	27.74
Republican	Ragnar G. Nelson (incumbent)	159,401.5	27.42
Democratic	John G. Ryan (incumbent)	130,728.5	22.49
Democratic	Adam S. Mioduski (incumbent)	129,881	22.35
Total votes		581,243	100.0

1944 Illinois House of Representatives election
Party	Candidate	Votes	%
Democratic	Adam S. Mioduski	164,413.5	27.59
Democratic	John G. Ryan (incumbent)	155,764	26.14
Republican	Ragnar G. Nelson (incumbent)	139,373.5	23.39
Republican	Edward Schneider	136,358	22.88
Total votes		595,909	100.0

1942 Illinois House of Representatives election
Party	Candidate	Votes	%
Republican	Elmer J. Schnackenberg (incumbent)	115,920.5	27.55
Democratic	John G. Ryan (incumbent)	105,735	25.13
Republican	Ragnar G. Nelson	100,437	23.87
Democratic	Adam S. Mioduski (incumbent)	98,719	23.46
Write-in		1	0.00
Total votes		420,812.5	100.0

=== 1940 – 1932 ===
1940 Illinois House of Representatives election
Party	Candidate	Votes	%
Republican	Elmer J. Schnackenberg (incumbent)	155,191.5	27.40
Democratic	John G. Ryan (incumbent)	151,743.5	26.79
Democratic	Adam S. Mioduski (incumbent)	134,495.5	23.75
Republican	Ragnar G. Nelson	124,948.5	22.06
Total votes		566,379	100.0

1938 Illinois House of Representatives election
Party	Candidate	Votes	%
Democratic	John G. Ryan (incumbent)	121,001	27.22
Republican	Elmer J. Schnackenberg (incumbent)	118,093.5	26.56
Democratic	Adam S. Mioduski	112,508	25.31
Republican	William C. Henry	92,949	20.91
Total votes		444,551.5	100.0

1936 Illinois House of Representatives election
Party	Candidate	Votes	%
Democratic	William W. Powers (incumbent)	153,786	29.03
Democratic	John G. Ryan (incumbent)	148,613	28.06
Republican	Elmer J. Schnackenberg (incumbent)	120,688	22.79
Republican	George R. Hillstrom	106,492.5	20.11
Write-in		1	0.00
Total votes		529,580.5	100.0

1934 Illinois House of Representatives election
Party	Candidate	Votes	%
Republican	Elmer J. Schnackenberg (incumbent)	132,668	40.17
Democratic	William W. Powers (incumbent)	100,816.5	30.52
Democratic	John G. Ryan (incumbent)	91,936	27.83
Independent	George A. Meade	1,856.5	0.56
Independent	Edgar D. Cressy	1,100	0.33
Independent	Charles V. Johnson	1,037.5	0.31
Independent	Victor Murray	888.5	0.27
Total votes		330,303	100.0

1932 Illinois House of Representatives election
Party	Candidate	Votes	%
Republican	Elmer J. Schnackenberg (incumbent)	115,826	27.33
Democratic	William W. Powers (incumbent)	112,629	26.58
Democratic	John G. Ryan	102,434	24.17
Republican	John R. Hillstrom	92,921	21.92
Write-in		3	0.00
Total votes		423,813	100.0

=== 1930 – 1922 ===
1930 Illinois House of Representatives election
Party	Candidate	Votes	%
Democratic	William W. Powers (incumbent)	131,733.5	52.29
Republican	Elmer J. Schnackenberg (incumbent)	68,079.5	27.03
Republican	John C. Garriott, Jr. (incumbent)	50,777	20.16
Independent	George J. Avery	1,004.5	0.40
Independent	Frank Hoskins	315	0.13
Total votes		251,909.5	100.0

1928 Illinois House of Representatives election
Party	Candidate	Votes	%
Democratic	William W. Powers (incumbent)	146,977	42.34
Republican	John C. Garriott, Jr. (incumbent)	103,704	29.88
Republican	Elmer J. Schnackenberg (incumbent)	96,439.5	27.78
Total votes		347,120.5	100.0

1926 Illinois House of Representatives election
Party	Candidate	Votes	%
Democratic	William W. Powers (incumbent)	71,929.5	37.11
Republican	Elmer J. Schnackenberg (incumbent)	45,735.5	23.60
Democratic	John C. Garriott, Jr.	39,099.5	20.17
Republican	Theo D. Smith (incumbent)	36,657.5	18.91
Progressive Party (United States, 1924–34)	Chas. F. Lowrie	399.5	0.21
Total votes		193,821.5	100.0

1924 Illinois House of Representatives election
Party	Candidate	Votes	%
Republican	Elmer J. Schnackenberg (incumbent)	80,927	37.16
Republican	Theo D. Smith	74,913.5	34.40
Democratic	William W. Powers (incumbent)	59,473.5	27.31
Socialist	Harry O. Forsberg	2,461	1.13
Total votes		217,775	100.0

1922 Illinois House of Representatives election
Party	Candidate	Votes	%
Democratic	William W. Powers	57,403.5	40.86
Republican	Gotthard A. Dahlberg (incumbent)	41,819.5	29.77
Republican	Elmer J. Schnackenberg	35,231	25.08
Socialist	Harold O. Forsberg	6,042.5	4.30
Total votes		140,496.5	100.0

1922 Illinois House of Representatives Republican primary
Party	Candidate	Votes	%
Republican	Gotthard A. Dahlberg (incumbent)	18,896	36.23
Republican	Elmer J. Schnackenberg	15,670	30.05
Republican	C. A. Young (incumbent)	13,826.5	26.51
Republican	W. C. Thomas	3,756	7.20
Total votes		52,148.5	100.0

=== 1920 – 1912 ===
1920 Illinois House of Representatives election
Party	Candidate	Votes	%
Republican	Gotthard A. Dahlberg (incumbent)	59,644.5	35.16
Republican	C. A. Young (incumbent)	56,390	33.25
Democratic	James W. Ryan (incumbent)	43,915	25.89
Socialist	Harold O. Forsberg	9,668.5	5.70
Total votes		169,618	100.0

1918 Illinois House of Representatives election
Party	Candidate	Votes	%
Democratic	James W. Ryan (incumbent)	34,206	40.66
Republican	C. A. Young (incumbent)	24,350	28.94
Republican	Gotthard A. Dahlberg (incumbent)	21,009	24.97
Socialist	Joseph A. Gajeski	4,571.5	5.43
Total votes		84,136.5	100.0

1916 Illinois House of Representatives election
Party	Candidate	Votes	%
Democratic	James W. Ryan (incumbent)	37,364	35.39
Republican	Gotthard A. Dahlberg (incumbent)	28,905	27.38
Republican	C. A. Young (incumbent)	26,422	25.03
Socialist	Theodore J. Vind	12,888.5	12.21
Total votes		105,579.5	100.0

1914 Illinois House of Representatives election
Party	Candidate	Votes	%
Democratic	James W. Ryan	21,867	32.80
Republican	Gotthard A. Dahlberg	13,832	20.75
Republican	C. A. Young	12,008.5	18.01
Progressive	Elmer J. Schnackenberg (incumbent)	10,086.5	15.13
Socialist	Seymour Stedman (incumbent)	8,878.5	13.32
Total votes		66,672.5	100.0

1912 Illinois House of Representatives election
Party	Candidate	Votes	%
Progressive	Elmer J. Schnackenberg	20,260	23.81
Socialist	Seymour Stedman	13,051.5	15.34
Republican	Benton F. Kleeman (incumbent)	10,257.5	12.06
Republican	John A. Swanson (incumbent)	10,022.5	11.78
Democratic	Timothy Dunne (incumbent)	9,362.5	11.00
Democratic	John W. Riley	9,033.5	10.62
Democratic	Fred C. Lockwood	8,937	10.50
Independent	Albert C. Moses	3,779.5	4.44
Prohibition	Chas. H. Doolittle	375.5	0.44
Total votes		85,079.5	100.0

=== 1910 – 1902 ===
1910 Illinois House of Representatives election
Party	Candidate	Votes	%
Republican	John A. Swanson	15,383	23.94
Republican	Benton F. Kleeman (incumbent)	14,248.5	22.18
Democratic	Timothy Dunne	14,054	21.87
Democratic	James J. Mulcahey	13,277	20.66
Socialist	Bernard Berlyn	5,570.5	8.67
Prohibition	George A. Cressey	1,720	2.68
Write-in		1.5	0.00
Total votes		64,254.5	100.0

1908 Illinois House of Representatives election
Party	Candidate	Votes	%
Democratic	John J. Poulton (incumbent)	22,720	31.06
Republican	Benton F. Kleeman	20,527	28.06
Republican	Cornelius J. Ton (incumbent)	19,899.5	27.20
Socialist	Harold J. LeCren	4,426.5	6.05
Prohibition	G. A. Dahlberg	3,902.5	5.33
Independent	Warren McIntire	1,680	2.30
Total votes		73,155.5	100.0

1906 Illinois House of Representatives election
Party	Candidate	Votes	%
Democratic	John J. Poulton (incumbent)	14,293.5	26.22
Republican	Cornelius J. Ton	13,416	24.61
Republican	Edward C. Fitch	12,806.5	23.49
Socialist	Theodore J. Vind	7,377	13.53
Independence	Charles J. Phillips	5,792.5	10.63
Independent	Otis A. Corner	828.5	1.52
Total votes		54,514	100.0

1904 Illinois House of Representatives election
Party	Candidate	Votes	%
Republican	William T. Monroe	18,182.5	26.29
Republican	Benton F. Kleeman (incumbent)	18,003.5	26.03
Democratic	John J. Poulton	17,185	24.85
Socialist	T. J. Vind	11,549.5	16.70
Prohibition	Eric Sandell	4,236.5	6.13
Total votes		69,157	100.0

1902 Illinois House of Representatives election
Party	Candidate	Votes	%
Democratic	Henry V. Meeteren	15,497	30.71
Republican	Benton F. Kleeman	13,412	26.58
Republican	James H. Wilkerson	12,441.5	24.66
Socialist	Seymour Steadman	5,780.5	11.46
Independent	Oscar Wolf	1,574.5	3.12
Prohibition	Frederick D. Peters	767	1.52
Independent Democrat	John Gohring	557.5	1.10
Single Tax	Amosa E. Conrow	331.5	0.66
Independent Republican	Luloff Wilson	93.5	0.19
Total votes		50,455	100.0

=== 1900 – 1892 ===
1898 Illinois House of Representatives election
Party	Candidate	Votes	%
Republican	James P. Cavanagh (incumbent)	11,046.5	30.41
Democratic	John Churan	9,707.5	26.73
Democratic	William Carmody (incumbent)	8,350.5	22.99
Unknown	Simon Shaffer	4,394	12.10
Unknown	James Kozisek	1,597	4.40
Unknown	Philip Rosenberg	679	1.87
Unknown	A. Woloshem	545	1.50
Total votes		36,319.5	100.0

1896 Illinois House of Representatives election
Party	Candidate	Votes	%
Republican	James P. Cavanaugh (incumbent)	15,328	34.63
Democratic	Edward J. Novak (incumbent)	10,890	24.60
Democratic	William Carmody	7,420	16.76
Democratic	Simon Shaeffer (incumbent)	6,897	15.58
Unknown	Michael E. Clare	1,243	2.81
Unknown	James Kozisek	1,111	2.51
Unknown	Harry Goldstine	715	1.62
Unknown	Isaac Levin	523	1.18
Unknown	Niles Johnson	139	0.31
Total votes		44,266	100.0

=== 1890 – 1882 ===
1886 Illinois House of Representatives election
Party	Candidate	Votes	%
Unknown	Frank E. Schoenewald	4,991.5	28.22
Unknown	Victor Karlowski	4,968	28.08
Unknown	J. J. Furlong	4,531.5	25.62
Unknown	Barney Brachtendorf (incumbent)	3,045	17.21
Unknown	A. J. Kerr	124	0.70
Unknown	John Miller	30	0.17
Total votes		17,690	100.0

1884 Illinois House of Representatives election
Party	Candidate	Votes	%
Unknown	Barney Brachtendorf	5,912.5	22.57
Unknown	Peter A. Sundelius (incumbent)	5,736.5	21.90
Unknown	Thomas F. Mulhearn	5,230.5	19.96
Unknown	Gregory A. Klupp (incumbent)	5,174	19.75
Unknown	Patrick T. Pendergast	2,447	9.34
Unknown	Christopher Dahnke	1,606	6.13
Unknown	Geo. Vogel	93	0.35
Total votes		26,199.5	100.0

1882 Illinois House of Representatives election
Party	Candidate	Votes	%
Unknown	John F. Dugan	4,972	28.49
Unknown	George A. Klupp	4,807	27.55
Unknown	Peter Sundelius	4,104	23.52
Unknown	B. Janssens	2,506.5	14.36
Unknown	Lars P. Nelson	1,060	6.07
Total votes		17,449.5	100.0
