= Illinois Senate elections of Barack Obama =

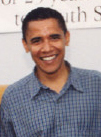
Barack Obama in the summer of 1998

Barack Obama won three Illinois Senate elections. The Illinois Senate career of Barack Obama began in 1997 after his first election in 1996 to a two-year term in the Illinois Senate representing Illinois' 13th Legislative District in Chicago. He was re-elected in 1998 to a four-year term and re-elected again in 2002 to another four-year term. He resigned from the Illinois Senate in 2004 following his election to the U.S. Senate. He resigned from the U.S. Senate following his election in 2008 to become the 44th President of the United States in 2009.

== First state Senate election, 1996 ==
=== Palmer announces noncandidacy ===
In August 1994, Republican Cook County State's Attorney Jack O'Malley announced the indictment of first-term U.S. Rep. Mel Reynolds (D-2) of South Shore. Newspapers reported that while Reynolds was unopposed on the general election ballot and would be re-elected in November 1994, state Sen. Alice Palmer (D-13) of South Shore would be the front runner for Reynolds' seat in 1996—or earlier if he was convicted and a special election was held.

In October 1994, 29-year-old Jesse Jackson Jr. of South Shore was reported to have moved a few blocks into the 2nd Congressional District and to be considering running for Reynolds' seat in 1996. After re-election in November 1994 to a four-year state Senate term, state Senate minority leader Emil Jones Jr. (D-14) of Morgan Park was reported to also be considering the possibility of running for Reynolds' seat in 1996.

On November 21, 1994, Alice Palmer announced she was launching a campaign committee to raise funds to run for Reynolds' congressional seat in 1996, and suggested that Jackson run for her state Senate seat in 1996 instead of running against her for Congress.

On June 27, 1995, Palmer announced she was running for Congress and would be giving up her state Senate seat instead of running for re-election in 1996. The following week newspapers reported that Palmer-supporter Barack Obama of Hyde Park—who had been announced as chairman of the $49.2 million Chicago Annenberg Challenge on June 22 and whose memoir Dreams from My Father would be published on July 18—would announce he was running and would be a front-runner for Palmer's state Senate seat; Obama began fundraising in July, created a campaign committee on August 7 and filed its statement of organization on September 5. Before entering the race, Obama spoke to about 30 elected officials in the district.

On September 11, 1995, Illinois Governor Jim Edgar set November 28 as the date for a special primary election to fill the vacancy created by the resignation of Mel Reynolds following his August 1995 conviction. The timing would allow state office holders whose terms expired in January 1997, like state Rep. Monique Davis (D-27) of Beverly, to run in the November 1995 special primary election, and if unsuccessful, still have time to file nominating petitions by the December 18 deadline for the March 1996 general primary election for re-election to their current state offices.

The September 13, 1995 Hyde Park Herald reported that state Sen. Palmer, whose term also expired in January 1997, "may have the most to lose. If unsuccessful in the congressional race, any plans she makes to reclaim her senate seat are likely to be unpopular with her progressive constituents. ... Palmer is committed to the congressional race, according to sources close to her campaign, and has no plans to try and recapture her senate seat if her bid is unsuccessful. The chances of Palmer re-filing for her senate seat are further reduced by the fact that one of her supporters, Barack Obama, is expected to announce his candidacy for her senate post next week."

=== Obama, Askia, Ewell announce candidacies ===
At 6 p.m. on September 19, 1995—the first day of the thirteen-week period in which candidates could circulate nominating petitions to earn a place on the ballot for the March 1996 primary—34-year-old Barack Obama announced his candidacy for Palmer's state Senate seat to a standing-room-only audience of 200 supporters at the Ramada Inn Lakeshore at 4900 S. Lake Shore Drive in Hyde Park-Kenwood, Chicago in the same room where thirteen years earlier Harold Washington had announced his successful run for Mayor of Chicago. Palmer introduced and endorsed Obama as her successor to supporters that included 4th Ward Ald. Toni Preckwinkle of Hyde Park, newly elected 5th Ward Ald. Barbara Holt of Hyde Park, state Rep. Barbara Flynn Currie (D-25) of Hyde Park, Cook County Clerk David Orr of Rogers Park, and many other politicians.

The October 25, 1995 Hyde Park Herald reported that two other first-time candidates, Gha-is Askia and Marc Ewell, had announced the previous week that they were also running for the state Senate seat Palmer was giving up.

- Gha-is F. Askia of South Shore was a 39-year-old Black Muslim assistant to W. Deen Mohammed and a close friend of Muhammad Ali (who would host a fundraiser for him in November) and had been a special assistant to Democratic Illinois Attorney General Roland Burris and was kept on as a community affairs liaison under Republican Illinois Attorney General Jim Ryan after campaigning for Ryan and Republican Illinois Governor Jim Edgar in 1994. Askia had campaigned for the re-election of U.S. Sen. Alan Dixon of Belleville over Carol Moseley-Braun of South Shore in the 1992 Democratic primary, supported the appointment of Clarence Thomas to the U.S. Supreme Court in 1991, and had campaigned for the re-election of Chicago city treasurer Miriam Santos of Lake View over four-term 5th Ward Ald. Larry Bloom of Hyde Park in the 1995 Democratic primary. Askia was endorsed by state Sen. Emil Jones Jr. (D-14) of Morgan Park, state Rep. Connie Howard (D-32) of Chatham, Chicago city treasurer Miriam Santos of Lake View, and Harold Washington Party chairman David Reed of Hyde Park.
- Marc Ewell of Chatham was the 30-year-old youngest son of former eight-term state Rep. Raymond W. Ewell of Chatham—a regular Democrat who had represented part of the 13th District for sixteen years (1967–1983) until losing a close Democratic primary race in 1982 to state Rep. Barbara Flynn Currie of Hyde Park, an independent Democrat, after redistricting had thrown the two incumbents into the same representative district. Ewell said he had been "born, raised, and educated in the 13th District" before going to Howard University in Washington, D.C., and had become a property inspector for a private real estate firm in 1995 after three years as a staff assistant to U.S. Sen. Carol Moseley-Braun. Ewell had worked on the campaigns of his father and Carol Moseley-Braun as well as those of Cook County Board president John Stroger, the late state Sen. Charles Chew, state Rep. Charles Morrow (D-26), and 17th Ward Ald. Allan Streeter.

An October 29, 1995 Sunday Chicago Sun-Times article about circulating nominating petitions—legally required to demonstrate a candidate has enough support from registered voters to be on the ballot with signatures that can withstand challenges by rival candidates—quoted Obama's campaign manager Carol Anne Harwell on the importance of volunteers, precinct captains, and campaign aides doing the thankless but essential job of circulating nominating petitions.

By late October 1995—after five of the ten Democrats who had filed to run in the special primary election for Reynolds' vacated congressional seat had been eliminated following challenges to their nominating petitions—polls showed Alice Palmer had dropped to a distant third behind Jesse Jackson Jr. and state Sen. Emil Jones Jr., which caused Palmer's fundraising to dry up in the final month of the campaign after having raised over $200,000 during the preceding twelve months.

On November 7, 1995, the condition of Obama's mother Ann Dunham—who had been diagnosed with metastatic uterine cancer and had undergone chemotherapy—acutely worsened and she was hospitalized in Honolulu and not able to respond when Obama's maternal half-sister Maya Soetoro arrived, and their mother died that night. Obama arrived in his native Honolulu the following day and said a decade later that his mother's death at the age of 52 was the worst experience of his life and cited as his biggest mistake not getting to Honolulu in time to be at her bedside when she died. Obama remained in Honolulu for his mother's private memorial service and returned to Chicago soon after.

On November 28, 1995, after finishing a distant third in the 2nd Congressional District special primary election behind the winner, 30-year-old Jackson, and 60-year-old Jones, and dismayed at receiving only 2,917 votes in Chicago and 3,426 votes in suburban Cook County, a disappointed 56-year-old Alice Palmer told a small gathering at a Harvey hotel that she wouldn't seek re-election to the state Senate and was undecided about entering the March 1996 primary for the 2nd Congressional District seat.

=== Lynch, Palmer announce candidacies ===
On December 4, 1995, some Palmer supporters—led by Northwestern University professor Adolph L. Reed Jr. who had recently moved to South Shore, Northeastern Illinois University associate professor Robert T. Starks of South Shore, and 77-year-old City Colleges of Chicago professor emeritus Timuel D. Black Jr. of Grand Crossing—began a draft movement to persuade her to run again for her state Senate seat after learning she was keeping a promise to back "a relatively unknown African-American attorney."

The December 8, 1995 Chicago Reader cover story was a laudatory eight-page profile of Obama that noted Palmer's endorsement of Obama and her promise not to run against him if she lost the November 28 special primary election for Reynolds' vacated congressional seat.

On December 11, 1995—the first filing day for nominating petitions—Obama filed his nominating petitions with over 3,000 signatures; perennial unsuccessful candidate Ulmer D. Lynch Jr. of Englewood also filed nominating petitions for the 13th District state Senate seat. Lynch was a 69-year-old former building manager, ex-city laborer, and former precinct captain in regular Democratic committeeman William Shannon's 17th Ward organization before he broke with Shannon and ran unsuccessfully against him for alderman in 1967 and subsequently regularly ran unsuccessfully for alderman and Democratic ward committeeman from the 17th Ward (and later the 16th Ward) and occasionally ran unsuccessfully for state representative.

On December 18, 1995—the last filing day for nominating petitions—Palmer held a press conference at Harper's Banquet Hall in Woodlawn to announce she was running for re-election to the state Senate, accepting a draft by over 100 supporters including Mark S. Allen of Englewood (Jesse Jackson Jr.'s campaign strategist and his successor as Rainbow/Push Coalition national field director), journalist-activist Lu Palmer of Bronzeville, SEIU Local 73 president Tom Balanoff, state Sen. Emil Jones Jr. (D-14) of Morgan Park, state Sen. Donne Trotter (D-15) of South Chicago, state Sen. Arthur Berman (D-9) of Edgewater, state Sen. Miguel del Valle (D-2) of Humboldt Park, state Rep. Lovana "Lou" Jones (D-5) of Douglas, and 5th Ward Ald. Barbara Holt of Hyde Park (the only local elected official reported to have switched their endorsement from Obama to Palmer). Palmer then drove to Springfield to file nominating petitions with almost 1,600 signatures she said her supporters had gathered in ten days; also filing nominating petitions on the last filing day were Askia and Ewell.

Palmer had originally endorsed Obama to fill her seat, but changed her mind, she said, because of the tremendous support and draft by constituents. "I had said I would help someone else and that is one of the reasons I was reluctant but the draft was so big," Palmer stated.

Obama said he was disappointed that Palmer had decided to run for re-election because it was partly based on her endorsement that he had decided to run. He said several months ago, Palmer asked him for his support of her congressional candidacy. "Aware of her reputation for integrity and her progressive views on the issues, I wholeheartedly agreed," Obama said. "On Sept. 19, based on Palmer's insistence that she was not running for state senator in the event she lost as well as her enthusiastic support, I announced that I would run for the Senate," Obama said.

On December 20, 1995, after consulting with his supporters, Obama confirmed that he was staying in the race. "I've made a commitment to a great number of volunteers ... people who've gone out on cold days and circulated petitions, raised funds on my behalf and after talking to them, they feel very strongly that we're talking about the right issues. We offer a vision for the future," Obama said.

=== Nominating petition challenges ===
On December 26, 1995—the last day to file challenges—Barack Obama's campaign filed objections to the legitimacy of the nominating petitions of state Sen. Palmer, and to those of Askia, Ewell and Lynch; a week later hearings began to determine whether their names would be on the ballot for the March 19 primary election.
The January 10, 1996 Hyde Park Herald reported that after conducting checks the previous week, the Chicago Board of Election Commissioners' initial findings indicated that all four would-be opponents of Obama, including incumbent state Sen. Palmer, may not have the required number of valid nominating petition signatures. Obama was endorsed by the New Party—a small, progressive party that has since dissolved. On January 13, Obama received the endorsement of the Independent Voters of Illinois-Independent Precinct Organization (IVI-IPO). On January 17, 1996—thirty days after her surprise announcement that she was running for re-election—Palmer announced she was withdrawing her bid for re-election because she was left with only 561 valid signatures on her nominating petitions, 196 short of the required 757 valid signatures needed to earn a place on the ballot after almost two-thirds of the 1,580 signatures on her nominating petitions were found to be invalid.

The Chicago Board of Election Commissioners had previously sustained an objection to the nominating petitions of Lynch because of insufficient valid signatures, and subsequently sustained objections to the nominating petitions of Askia—who was left with only 688 valid signatures on his nominating petitions, 69 short of the required 757 valid signatures after almost two-thirds of the 1,899 signatures on his nominating petitions were found to be invalid, and Ewell—who was left with only 671 valid signatures on his nominating petitions, 86 short of the required 757 valid signatures after almost half of the 1,286 signatures on his nominating petitions were found to be invalid. Lynch and Ewell, in separate federal lawsuits, unsuccessfully sued the Chicago Board of Election Commissioners seeking to reverse its decision to remove their names from the ballot.

=== Primary and general elections ===
In the March 19, 1996 primary election, Obama, running unopposed on the ballot, received 16,279 votes in winning the Democratic nomination for state senator for the 13th District. The citywide turnout of 35% was a then record low for a presidential primary election in Chicago and down from 56% in 1992.

In September 1996, the Hyde Park Herald reported that, according to the Illinois State Board of Elections, Obama would face two challengers on the November general election ballot: Harold Washington Party candidate David Whitehead and Republican Party candidate Rosette Caldwell Peyton.

- David Whitehead of West Englewood was a 61-year-old perennial unsuccessful candidate who had been a homebuilder, real estate broker and salesman, and beginning in 1983 had run unsuccessfully five times for alderman from the 15th Ward, run unsuccessfully in the 1990 Democratic Party primary for state representative, and run unsuccessfully as a Harold Washington Party candidate for Cook County commissioner in 1994.
- Rosette Caldwell Peyton of South Shore was a 67-year-old first-time candidate who had been a teacher at Kozminski Community Academy in Hyde Park.

In October 1996, the Chicago Tribune and the Chicago Sun-Times both endorsed Obama for state Senate.

In the November 5, 1996 general election, Democratic Party candidate Obama was elected state senator for the 13th District with 48,592 votes (82.15%); Harold Washington Party candidate David Whitehead received 7,461 votes (12.61%); and Republican Party candidate Rosette Caldwell Peyton received 3,091 votes (5.22%). The citywide turnout of 63% was the record low for a presidential general election in Chicago and was down from 74.5% in 1992. The 1996 election was the last in Illinois to allow straight-ticket voting.

On January 8, 1997, Obama was sworn in for a two-year term as state senator for the 13th District, which was then a T-shaped district that spanned Chicago South Side neighborhoods from 47th Street in Hyde Park-Kenwood south through South Shore to 81st Street and from the lakefront west through Chicago Lawn (on the north side of Marquette Park) to Central Park Avenue (3600 W).

== Second state Senate election, 1998 ==
In the March 17, 1998 primary election, Obama, running unopposed on the ballot, received 16,792 votes in winning the Democratic nomination for state senator for the 13th District, and Yesse B. Yehudah, also running unopposed on the ballot, received 401 votes in winning the Republican nomination.

- Yesse Ben Yehudah of South Shore was the 50-year-old founder and executive director of F.O.R.U.M (Fulfilling Our Responsibilities Unto Mankind).

In October 1998, the Chicago Tribune and the Chicago Sun-Times again both endorsed Obama for state Senate.

In the November 3, 1998 general election, Democratic Party candidate Obama was re-elected to a four-year term as state senator for the 13th District with 45,486 votes (89.17%); Republican Party candidate Yesse Yehudah received 5,526 (10.83%).

== Third state Senate election, 2002 ==
On September 5, 2001, Democrats won a lottery that added a tie-breaking ninth member (Michael Bilandic) to the bipartisan state Legislative Redistricting Commission, which on September 25, 2001, by a 5–4 party-line vote approved the Democratic map called "Currie II as amended by the Bilandic Amendment" after its Legislative Redistricting Commission member authors, state Rep. Barbara Flynn Currie (D-25) of Hyde Park and former Chicago Mayor Bilandic.

After redistricting, the new 13th District spanned Chicago lakefront neighborhoods from Goethe Street (1300 N) in the Gold Coast south through South Chicago to 98th Street in the Vets Park neighborhood of South Deering; with a Census 2000 total population that was 66% black (voting age population 62% black), versus a Census 2000 total population that was 77% black in the old 13th District.

In the March 19, 2002 primary election, Obama, running unopposed on the ballot, received 30,938 votes in winning the Democratic nomination for state senator for the new 13th District.

In the November 5, 2002 general election, Democratic Party candidate Obama, running unopposed on the ballot, was re-elected to a four-year term as state senator for the new 13th District with 48,717 votes.

== Notes ==
Political offices
Preceded by Alice J. Palmer	Illinois State Senator from 13th district January 8, 1997 - November 4, 2004	Succeeded by Kwame Raoul
