= Senator Newhouse =

Senator Newhouse may refer to:

- Irv Newhouse (1920–2001), Washington State Senate
- Joe Newhouse (born 1977), Oklahoma State Senate
- Richard H. Newhouse Jr. (1924–2002), Illinois State Senate
