= Eugene Schulter =

American politician (born 1947)

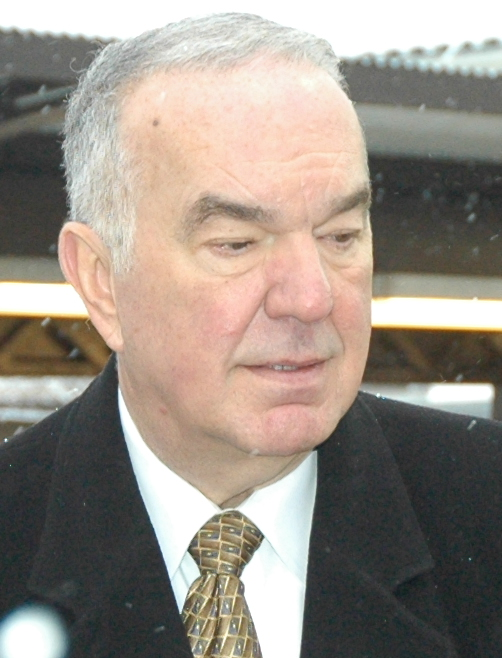
- Schulter in 2008

City of Chicago Alderman from the 47th ward
- In office 1975–2011
- Preceded by: John J. Hoellen Jr.
- Succeeded by: Ameya Pawar

Personal details
- Born: November 14, 1947 (age 78)
- Party: Democratic Party
- Spouse: Rosemary
- Children: Two
- Profession: Politician

Gene Schulter (born November 14, 1947) was alderman of the 47th ward of the city of Chicago. He was first elected in 1975 and served until his retirement in 2011.

== Early life ==
Schulter is the youngest of five children, all raised in Chicago. He attended John Audubon School and later graduated from Lake View High School in 1965. Schulter earned his bachelor's degree from Loyola University. He was also awarded a Law Degree. Schulter also earned a post graduate degree from the Kennedy School of Government at Harvard University.

== Aldermanic career ==
In 1975, Schulter was recruited by 47th Ward Committeeman and Chicago Park District Superintendent Ed Kelly to run for City Council in the ward against John J. Hoellen Jr., a foe of mayor Richard J. Daley who was also running against Daley in the coinciding mayoral election. He won the election. He was only 26, making him one of the youngest aldermen to serve in the city council.

As alderman, Schulter worked for license reform. Schulter is responsible for legislation that guaranteed equitable citywide cable services and set asides for minorities; he led the drive for more community input on parks; and sponsored the city's Landscape Oridnance which requires the incorporation of landscape plans and planting of trees for every new residential, commercial, or industrial development.

Schulter highlighted the Sulzer Regional Library as a major ward achievement. Also, he worked to build a field house at Chase Park, fostered revitalization of Lincoln Square Mall, and supported the development of the Ravenswood Industrial Corridor.

During his tenure, Schulter was chairman of the Committee on License and Consumer Protection. He served on six other committees: Budget and Government Relations; Finance; Committees, Rules and Ethics; Traffic Control and Safety; Zoning; and Parks and Recreation.

In 2008, Schulter expended a portion of his aldermanic expense account as a salary for his daughter, Monica. A city ordinance prohibits the spending of aldermanic expense funds for "the direct monetary benefit of any alderman or any of his or her relatives."

In 2011, Schulter announced his retirement from the city council. The open seat was subsequently won by Ameya Pawar. Pawar gained under 51% of all votes cast, narrowly avoiding a runoff against Schulter ally Tom O'Donnell.

== Professional career ==
Schulter is a paid director of North Community Bank, a bank in Chicago with locations in the 47th ward.

== Personal life ==
Schulter is married to Rosemary. They have two children together.
