= Senator Starr =

Senator Starr may refer to:

- Bruce Starr (born 1969), Oregon State Senate
- Charles Starr (born 1933), Oregon State Senate
- David Starr (politician), New Hampshire State Senate
- Harry W. Starr (1879–1934), Illinois State Senate
- Robert A. Starr (born 1942), Vermont State Senate
- Terrell Starr (1925–2009), Georgia State Senate

== See also ==
- Sol Star (1840–1917), South Dakota State Senate
