= Independent Voters of Illinois-Independent Precinct Organization =

The Independent Voters of Illinois-Independent Precinct Organization (IVI-IPO) is an independent, not-for-profit, Illinois political organization. IVI-IPO states that it is "dedicated to good government activism and an idealistic vision of open, honest government in Illinois through pragmatic means that confront cynicism and corruption with equal force." The organization is organized into geographical "chapters" and, while technically a statewide organization, is concentrated in the Chicago area.

IVI-IPO works on voter registration drives, provides voter information, and supports endorsed candidates. It endorses through a detailed questionnaire to candidates for office, followed by endorsement session vote of the "chapter," followed in some cases, such as larger offices, by a vote of the board of directors. The organization then typically prints and widely distributes, through newsprint flyers and often print media advertisement, a list of its endorsements, with explanations for voters. As the name indicates, the organization at one time attempted to build a precinct organization that was independent of the political parties. By and large, the organization no longer conducts precinct work. The organization also acts as a lobbyist, primarily in the Illinois state legislature, on behalf of governmental reform issues. Its adopted positions are generally liberal, and in recent years the organization, more often than not, endorses Democrats. It also endorses in primary races.

The current State Chairman of IVI-IPO is Alonso Edgar Zaragoza, who succeeded two-term State Chair Bob Bartell, who also served four terms in the 1990s.

== History ==
Often referred to by its acronym, IVI-IPO, has roots dating to 1944, when the Independent Voters of Illinois (IVI) was founded. In 1979 the IVI merged with the Independent Precinct Organization (IPO), which was founded by Dick Simpson a few years earlier and had worked to elect him Alderman of the 44th Ward as well as other independent candidates.

IPO was founded to support the best candidate for a political position regardless of party affiliation and to effect political and community change through grass roots organizing. Both organizations were and are nonpartisan. Glynn Sudbery served as IPO's executive director prior to its merger with IVI. Each year since his death, IVI-IPO has bestowed the Glynn Sudbery Award to honor activists and leaders who identify with and support the LGBT community.

The IVI-IPO supported Harold Washington in the Illinois House of Representatives and as Mayor of Chicago during the 1980s "Council Wars." On January 13, 1996 the IVI-IPO endorsed community organizer Barack Obama early in his first attempt at elected office, his first run for the Illinois Senate. In the 2008 Democratic presidential primary contest, whether Barack Obama personally reviewed his answers to an IVI-IPO questionnaire filled out during his 2004 campaign for the U.S. Senate became a campaign controversy.

In 2009, the IVI-IPO filed suit claiming the City of Chicago’s 2008 concession agreement for the operation of its parking meters to a private company violated state law.
