= John J. Hoellen Jr. =

Illinois politician (1914–1999)

John J. Hoellen

Member of the Chicago City Council from the 47th ward
- In office 1947–1975
- Preceded by: Frank O. Hilburn
- Succeeded by: Eugene Schulter

Personal details
- Born: September 24, 1914 Chicago, Illinois, U.S.
- Died: January 30, 1999 (aged 84) Chicago, Illinois, U.S.
- Party: Republican
- Parent: John J. Hoellen Sr. (father)

John James Hoellen Jr. (September 24, 1914 – January 30, 1999) was an American politician who served as alderman of Chicago's 47th ward from 1947 to 1975. His father, John J. Hoellen Sr., had served as alderman of that same ward from 1925 to 1933.

Hoellen was the unsuccessful 1975 Republican nominee for mayor of Chicago, losing to incumbent Democrat Richard J. Daley. Hoellen also thrice ran unsuccessfully for the United States House of Representatives as a Republican nominee.

== Early life ==
Hoellen was the son of John J. Hoellen Sr., a Republican politician who served as alderman on the Chicago City Council and Republican committeeman for the 47th ward of Chicago. His father was on the city council from 1925–33. In 1936, when Hoellen was 22-years-old and attending law school at Northwestern University, his father died.

After law school, Hoellen served in the United States Military and worked in the Illinois Attorney General's Office.

== Political career ==
In 1947, Hoellen won election to his father's previous aldermanic seat on the Chicago City Council. He unseated first-term incumbent Frank O. Hillborn. Like his father, Hoellen was a Republican. and at the time of his he left office, he had been the sole Republican member of the Chicago City Council. By the end of his council tenure in 1975, he was the sole remaining Republican member of the Chicago City Council.

One of Richard J. Daley's fiercest enemies in the Council during his tenure, Hoellen was known for his bravado and acerbic wit. He ran unsuccessfully against Daley for Clerk in 1955, as well as in the 1975 Chicago mayoral election. Hoellen was a "good-government" focused politician, who often delivered passionate speeches criticizing waste, corruption, and inefficiency. In 1961, he was one of only three alderman who voted against an urban renewal plan to bulldoze much of Little Italy to build the campus for the University of Illinois at Chicago. He would often vote against tax increases and demand investigations into questionable land deals and hiring scandals. He occasionally partnered on votes with liberal Democrats, including Leon Despres.

In 1965 he voted against the construction of several public housing projects on the South Side, correctly predicting that they would become vertical slums. However, he also made controversial remarks during debate on the vote, remarking, "This is primarily negro housing. Everybody knows the negro loves good soil. He likes the feel of dirt and the smell of trees."

He was also known for various odd behavior. He proposed that the new Picasso statue in Daley Plaza be replaced with a statue of Ernie Banks.

In 1965, he led a campaign to see Wilbur Wright College remove James Baldwin's novel Another Country from its reading list due to it having what he regarded to be "filthy" themes of interracial and homosexual relations.

First elected in 1947, he was reelected to the City Council in 1951, 1955, 1959, 1963, 1967, and 1971. The latter four reelections came despite mayor Daley's efforts to see him unseated.

He thrice ran unsuccessfully for United States Congress as the Republican nominee for Illinois's 11th congressional district in 1966, 1968, and 1972.

In 1975, he not only lost the mayoral race, but also lost his simultaneous bid for reelection as alderman.

In 1979, he was appointed by Illinois Governor James R. Thompson to the Chicago Transit Authority Board, on which he served until retiring in 1990.

== See also ==
- List of Chicago aldermen since 1923
