= Cyril R. Jandus =

American politician and lawyer

Cyril R. Jandus (July 22, 1867–March 6, 1933) was an American politician and lawyer.

Jandus was born in Bohemia which was part of the Austro-Hungarian Empire. He emigrated to the United States in 1868 and settled in Chicago, Illinois. He went to the Chicago public schools. Jandus was admitted to the Illinois bar in 1896 and practiced law in Chicago. He served as an assistant city prosecutor and as an assistant corporation counsel for the city of Chicago. Jandus served in the Illinois House of Representatives from 1901 to 1903. He then served in the Illinois Senate from 1903 to 1911. He was a Democrat. Jandus died at his home in Chicago, Illinois.
