= Walker Butler =

American jurist and politician

Walker Butler (March 22, 1898 – November 15, 1969) was an American jurist and politician.

Born in Chicago, Illinois, Butler went to Campion College in Prairie du Chien, Wisconsin where he took a pre-law course. He then received his law degree from Loyola University Chicago School of Law in 1920 and practiced law in Chicago. Walker worked as assistant state's attorney for Cook County, Illinois and as Illinois Assistant Attorney General. From 1943 until his resignation in 1953, Butler served in the Illinois State Senate and was a Republican. He served as President Pro Tempore of the Illinois Senate. From 1953 until his death in 1969, Butler served as Illinois Circuit Court judge for Cook County, Illinois. Butler died in a hospital in Chicago, Illinois.
