= Alice Palmer (politician) =

American politician and educator (1939–2023)

Member of the Illinois Senate from the 13th district
- In office June 6, 1991 – January 8, 1997
- Preceded by: Richard H. Newhouse Jr.
- Succeeded by: Barack Obama

Personal details
- Born: Alice J. Roberts; June 20, 1939 Indianapolis, Indiana, U.S.
- Died: May 25, 2023 (aged 83)
- Party: Democratic
- Spouse: Edward Palmer
- Children: 2
- Education: Indiana University Bloomington (BS); Roosevelt University (MA); Northwestern University (PhD)
- Occupation: Educator, politician

Alice J. Palmer (née Roberts, June 20, 1939 – May 25, 2023) was an American educator and politician who served as a member of the Illinois Senate. Known as a longtime progressive activist, Palmer represented the state's 13th Senate District from June 6, 1991, until January 8, 1997. At the time, the district spanned an economically diverse area and included the Chicago communities of Hyde Park, South Shore and Englewood.

First appointed to fill the vacant seat of retired state senator Richard H. Newhouse, Jr., Palmer successfully ran for election in 1992 and served a four-year term that ended on January 8, 1997. She ran unsuccessfully for the U.S. House of Representatives in 1995, and was disqualified from running in the Democratic primary for her Illinois Senate seat by Barack Obama, who was running against her and successfully challenged her petition signatures. Obama succeeded her in office.

== Early life and education ==
Palmer was born in Indianapolis, Indiana, to Erskine and Mary Ward Roberts. She graduated from high school at age 16, enrolled at Indiana University Bloomington, but left school for an extended period. She returned to college and received a Bachelor of Science in English and sociology from Indiana University in 1965. She earned an M.A. in urban studies from Roosevelt University, and a Ph.D. in educational administration from Northwestern University.

== Career ==
Palmer began her teaching career in Indianapolis then moved to Chicago to teach at Malcolm X College, one of the City Colleges of Chicago. While working on her degree at Northwestern University, Palmer co-authored two books and tutored. She then took a position at Northwestern as Associate Dean and Director of African American Student Affairs for five years.

Palmer became involved in a national voter education movement, then founded the Chicago YMCA Youth and Government Program in 1986. In addition, she was executive director of Chicago Cities in Schools. In the late-1980s, she was on the board of the Chicago Committee in Solidarity with Southern Africa, an anti-apartheid group.

=== Illinois Senate ===
Palmer was appointed to the Illinois State Senate in June 1991 to fill the remainder of the term of longtime State Senator Richard J. Newhouse, Jr., who had retired. She successfully ran for election in 1992 and served a four-year term that ended on January 8, 1997.

While in the Illinois State Senate, Palmer initially served on the committees for Appropriations, Commerce and Economic Development, Elementary and Secondary Education and Higher Education, rising to vice chairperson of Commerce and Economic Development. Later in her tenure, she served on the State Government Operations- and the Economic and Fiscal Commissions, and was a member of the Legislative Bureau and the Legislative Information Systems committee.

=== 1995 U.S. House campaign ===
In July 1995, seven months after launching an exploratory fundraising committee for a U.S. congressional run, Palmer announced she would run to replace U.S. Representative Mel Reynolds who was then under indictment for sex crimes. She also said that she would not seek reelection to the Illinois State Senate in 1996. Shortly afterward, Barack Obama, who had never held political office to-date, launched his campaign committee for Palmer's Illinois State Senate seat.

Following Reynolds' conviction and resignation from the U.S. House in August 1995, a special election primary was set for November 1995 to replace Reynolds. In September 1995, Palmer supporters held a press conference asking other announced and rumored candidates to drop out to allow Palmer to run in the special primary without opposition.

On September 19, 1995, Barack Obama formally announced his candidacy for the state senate, with Palmer introducing and endorsing Obama as her successor, according to multiple accounts. According to The New Yorker, Palmer's endorsement "brought with it two organizational assets: local operators and local activists".

On November 28, 1995, after finishing a distant third behind Jesse Jackson, Jr. in the primary to replace Reynolds, Palmer remarked that she still would not seek re-election to the state senate. However, Palmer changed her mind and filed nominating petitions with 1,580 signatures on December 18, 1995, the last day for filing. That day, Obama told the Chicago Tribune, "I am disappointed that she's decided to go back on her word to me."

In early January 1996, Obama challenged Palmer's petitions and those of the three other prospective Democratic candidates. Nearly two-thirds of the signatures on Palmer's petitions were found to be invalid, leaving her almost 200 signatures short of the required 757 signatures of registered voters residing in the Illinois Senate district.

None of the other three prospective candidates had the required number of valid signatures. As a result, Obama, who had filed nominating petitions with over 3,000 signatures on the first filing day, appeared alone on the ballot for the March 16 Democratic primary. This assured him of election in this heavily Democratic district. He easily defeated the Republican and Harold Washington Party candidates in the November general election. In a 2007 interview with the Chicago Tribune, Obama said that the challenges were justified by obvious flaws in the signature sheets.

=== Later career ===
After leaving public office, Palmer became an associate professor in the College of Urban Planning and Public Affairs at the University of Illinois at Chicago, and she was a special assistant to the president of the university before retiring.

Palmer endorsed Hillary Clinton during the 2008 Democratic Party presidential primaries. She was reportedly a key supporter of Danny Davis in his 2011 run for mayor of Chicago against Rahm Emanuel.

== Death ==
Palmer died on May 25, 2023, at the age of 83.

Illinois Senate
Preceded by Richard H. Newhouse, Jr.	Illinois State Senator from 13th district June 6, 1991 – January 8, 1997	Succeeded by Barack Obama
