= Gotthard A. Dahlberg =

American lawyer and politician

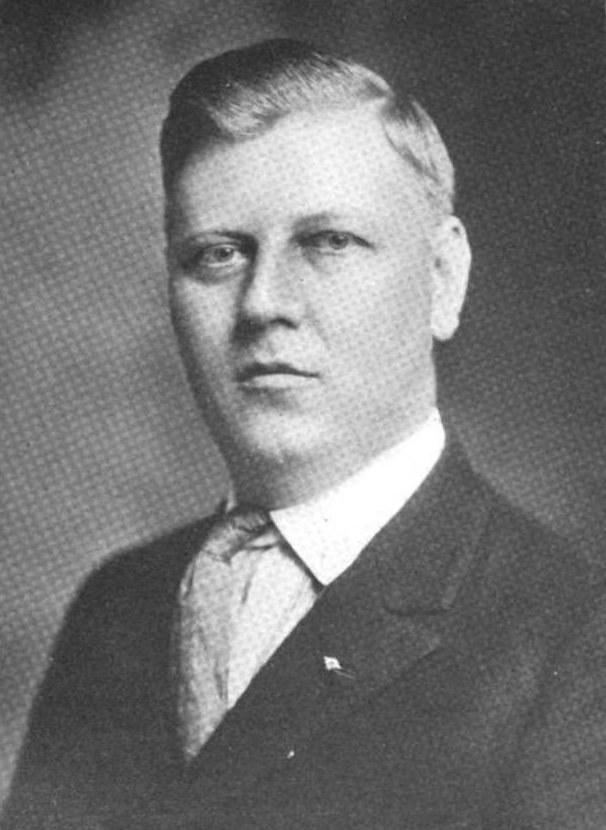

Member of the Illinois House of Representatives
- In office 1914–1926

Personal details
- Born: July 17, 1884 Hjo, Sweden
- Died: October 8, 1948 (aged 64) Chicago, Illinois
- Party: Republican
- Education: Chicago–Kent College of Law
- Occupation: Lawyer, politician

Gotthard A. Dahlberg (July 17, 1884 – October 8, 1948) was an American lawyer and politician.

Gotthard A. Dahlberg was born at Hjo, in Västra Götaland, Sweden. He emigrated with his parents to the United States, in 1890, and settled in Chicago, Illinois. Dahlberg went to public schools and then received his law degree from Chicago–Kent College of Law. Dahlberg then practiced law in Chicago. From 1915 to 1925, Dahlberg served in the Illinois House of Representatives and was a Republican. In 1921, Dahlberg served as speaker of the house. After he left the Illinois General Assembly, Dahlberg continue to practice law and was attorney for the Chicago Board of Local Improvements.

He died in Chicago on October 9, 1948.
