= Harry W. Starr =

American politician

Harry W. Starr (February 1, 1879 – June 20, 1934) was an American politician and lawyer.

Born in Gilman, Illinois, Starr worked on the farm and in a country store. He went to Chicago, Illinois and worked at the United States Post Office as he attended night law school. In 1910, Starr graduated from Chicago–Kent College of Law and was admitted to the Illinois bar. Starr was an assistant city attorney for the city of Chicago and an election commissioner. From 1927 until 1931, Starr served in the Illinois State Senate and was a Republican. He died of a heart attack at his summer house in Barnes, Wisconsin, Bayfield County, Wisconsin.
