= 1975 Chicago mayoral election =

- April 1, 1975
- Turnout: 47.3% ▼20.6 pp
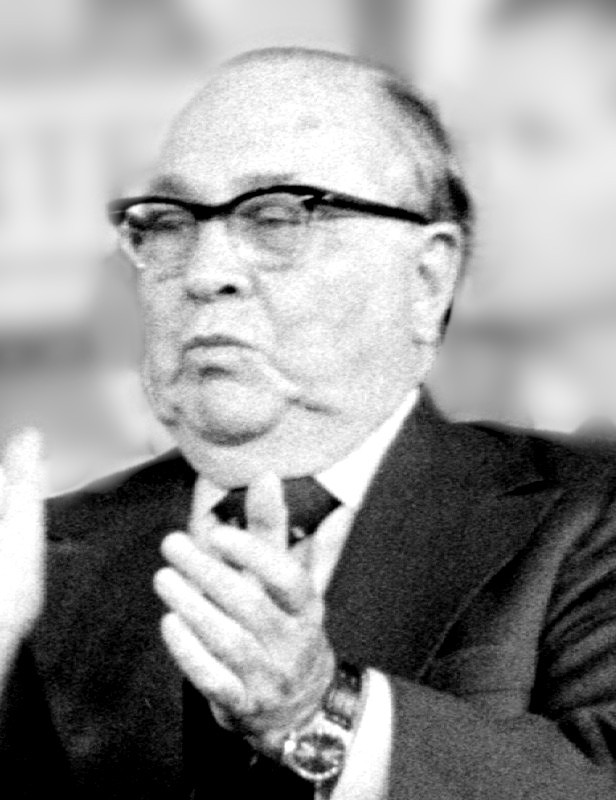

Nominee	Richard J. Daley	John J. Hoellen Jr.
Party	Democratic	Republican
Popular vote	542,817	139,335
Percentage	77.67%	19.94%
Mayor before election
Richard J. Daley
Democratic
Elected Mayor
Richard J. Daley
Democratic

The Chicago mayoral election of 1975 was held on April 1, 1975. Democratic Party incumbent Richard J. Daley was elected to a record sixth term as mayor by a landslide 59% margin over Republican nominee John J. Hoellen Jr. Only one other individual (Daley's son Richard M. Daley) has since matched Daley's feat of winning six Chicago mayoral elections. This was the first Chicago mayoral election since the ratification of the Twenty-sixth Amendment to the United States Constitution, which lowered the voting age from 21 to 18.

The election was preceded by primary elections to determine the Democratic Party and Republican Party nominations, which were on February 25, 1975. Daley was renominated by a wide margin against challenges by Chicago Alderman William Singer, Illinois State Senator Richard H. Newhouse Jr. and former Cook County State's Attorney Edward Hanrahan. The Socialist Workers Party successfully collected signatures to petition for Willie Mae Reid to be included on the general election ballot as their nominee.

== Nominations ==
57.55% of registered voters participated in the primary elections.

=== Democratic primary ===
Daley fended off several challengers. For the first time since he was elected mayor, Daley was facing what appeared to be significant opposition in a Democratic primary. On paper, all three opponents he faced were serious contenders. Daley's health had declined by 1974, and he had taken an extended absence to recuperate after a June 1, 1974 surgery to unclog a partially blocked carotid artery. Amid this extended absence, speculation arose that Daley might not seek an additional term as mayor. By 1975, many believed that Daley's political stature was beginning to wane, and he was seen to be out of touch with both the times and the climate of the city. Additionally, by 1975, news stories had arisen that shows political corruption and dishonesty related to Daley and his administration.

Independent alderman William Singer was more liberal than Daley. He was reform-minded, and considered a lakefront liberal. Singer announce his campaign early, doing so in October 1973. The focus of Singer's campaign was the poor state of the public schools in the city. Singer pledged that he would visit each and every one of the city's 584 public schools. Singer also laid blame for the loss of 200,000 jobs in the city with Daley, and pledged that as mayor he would bring jobs back. Singer received support from the affluent lakefront and Hyde Park, areas that were home to the lakefront liberals. Singer had a strong grassroots organization and raised and spent between $600,000 and $700,000 for his campaign. Singer also was endorsed by congressman Ralph Metcalfe, who declined to run for mayor despite calls for him to do so. Metcalfe, a one-time ally of Daley, had become critical of what he alleged was racism and brutality in the Chicago Police Department.

African American State Senator Richard H. Newhouse Jr. was the first black candidate on the ballot in a Chicago mayoral election. Originally, four black candidates had announced they would challenge Daley. However, candidates such as criminal lawyer E. Duke McNeil dropped-out to back Newhouse. Ultimately, Newhouse would be the only black candidate on the ballot. This campaign came at a time when a number of major United States city's had seen notable campaigns by African-Americans for mayoralties, such as Maynard Jackson's successful campaign the previous year in Atlanta and Coleman Young's successful campaign two years prior in Detroit. However, in both these cities, blacks comprised a greater portion of the populace. Many supporting the efforts to elect a black mayor in Chicago in 1975 had hoped that congressman Ralph Metcalfe would run, as they believed him to have been the strongest potential black challenger to Daley. However, Metcalfe, after taking some tentative steps towards possibly running and even raising some money for a possibly candidacy, declined to run. Metcalfe endorsed Singer instead of Newhouse. Newhouse received the endorsements of Jesse Jackson and his organization PUSH. It would ultimately, not be until 1983 that Chicago would elect a black mayor.

Despite there being a black candidate in the race, the Chicago Defender endorsed Daley, as did noted African American publisher John H. Johnson.

Former Cook County State's Attorney Edward Hanrahan also ran. His base of support was in white "ethnic" wards of the city, as black voters hated him due to the role of the office he oversaw as state's attorney in the raid that killed Fred Hampton. He was seeking to stage a political comeback after having left office after scandal. As a candidate, Harahan regularly attacked Daley for what he regarded to be Daley's, "arrogance of total political power." During the campaign, Daley refused to appear at events which featured other contenders. While Daley's previous reelection efforts had earned him the endorsement of the Chicago Tribune, in 1975 they abstained from endorsing in the Democratic primary declaring in its editorial that the choice presented in the primary was, "whether to stay about the rudderless galleon with rotting timbers or to take to the raging seas in a 17-foot outboard". By the end of the primary campaign, it was evident that the race had narrowed primarily to a contest between Daley and Singer. Both of these candidates made use of media. While running a campaign heavily on organizing the Democratic machine on the ground, Daley used television to a greater extent than he had in his previous campaigns. Singer brought in media consultant David Garth, who had recently been involved in Hugh Carey's successful New York gubernatorial campaign.

==== Results ====
Daley carried a plurality of the vote in 48 of the city's 50 wards (35 of which he also had a simple majority of the vote in). Singer carried an outright simple majority of the vote in the two remaining wards. Daley won 57.9% of the vote. Daley's victory was seen as surprisingly large. Daley saw only 48% of the vote in the predominantly African American wards.

Daley outperformed expectations, while his challengers underperformed in their geographic base areas. Singer had been anticipated to prevail strongly with voters in the lakefront areas, with it being believed that the independent voters in these areas would harbor distaste for scandals which plagued the Daley Administration. Instead, Daley very narrowly led Singer in the six lakefront wards, receiving 46.5% to Singers's 46.4% there. It was expected that, with Newhouse's historic candidacy as the first black mayoral candidate in the city's history, and with the city's most prominent black politician, Metacalfe, defecting from his onetime allegiance with Daley to endorse Singer, Daley would lose a significant share of African American support. However, in the city's ten black-majority wards, Daley led with 47% to Singer's 31.2% and Newhouse's 19.9%. Hanrahan was expected to perform well in ethnically white wards. However, in the eleven white "ethnic" wards, Daley received 67.2% of the vote to Singer's 22.3% and Hanrahan's mere 7.2%.

Democratic primary results
Party	Candidate	Votes	%
Democratic	Richard J. Daley (incumbent)	463,717	57.9
Democratic	William Singer	234,470	29.3
Democratic	Richard H. Newhouse Jr.	63,479	7.9
Democratic	Edward Hanrahan	39,703	5.0
Total votes		801,369	

Results by ward
Ward	Richard J. Daley		William Singer		Richard Newhouse		Edward Hanrahan		Total
Ward	Votes	%	Votes	%	Votes	%	Votes	%	Votes
1	8,482	69.5%	2,554	20.9%	870	7.1%	294	2.4%	12,200
2	5,919	47.3%	4,111	32.8%	2,206	17.6%	280	2.2%	12,516
3	5,443	55.1%	2,924	29.6%	1,343	13.6%	174	1.8%	9,884
4	6,862	51.5%	4,411	33.1%	1,854	13.9%	196	1.5%	13,323
5	4,931	29.9%	8,617	52.3%	2,634	16.0%	309	1.9%	16,491
6	6,119	42.8%	4,585	32.1%	3,325	23.3%	253	1.8%	14,282
7	6,001	46.8%	4,065	31.7%	2,032	15.9%	711	5.6%	12,809
8	6,544	40.1%	5,735	35.1%	3,744	22.9%	309	1.9%	16,332
9	5,261	48.5%	3,219	29.7%	1,940	17.9%	426	3.9%	10,846
10	12,209	65.3%	3,909	20.9%	1,441	7.7%	1,128	6.0%	18,687
11	23,819	87.1%	1,945	7.1%	1,167	4.3%	430	1.6%	27,361
12	14,299	71.2%	3,438	17.1%	831	4.1%	1,506	7.5%	20,074
13	18,476	73.3%	3,957	15.7%	935	3.7%	1,841	7.3%	25,209
14	12,706	72.8%	2,803	16.1%	818	4.7%	1,133	6.5%	17,460
15	9,539	64.0%	2,954	19.8%	1,518	10.2%	887	6.0%	14,898
16	5,838	55.2%	2,789	26.4%	1,750	16.6%	191	1.8%	10,568
17	4,991	45.2%	3,679	33.3%	2,174	19.7%	204	1.8%	11,048
18	12,854	64.9%	4,046	20.4%	1,897	9.6%	994	5.0%	19,791
19	16,046	69.5%	4,782	20.7%	874	3.8%	1,381	6.0%	23,083
20	6,258	52.7%	3,268	27.5%	2,133	18.0%	207	1.7%	11,866
21	6,516	38.7%	5,994	35.6%	4,009	23.8%	334	2.0%	16,853
22	8,202	63.1%	3,029	23.3%	960	7.4%	807	6.2%	12,998
23	13,975	67.1%	4,311	20.7%	628	3.0%	1,918	9.2%	20,832
24	5,476	57.1%	2,464	25.7%	1,480	15.4%	173	1.8%	9,593
25	8,412	72.1%	2,205	18.9%	594	5.1%	451	3.9%	11,662
26	9,917	66.7%	3,120	21.0%	930	6.3%	908	6.1%	14,875
27	5,754	59.7%	2,207	22.9%	1,452	15.1%	226	2.3%	9,639
28	3,761	48.3%	2,366	30.4%	1,446	18.6%	209	2.7%	7,782
29	4,926	53.8%	2,600	28.4%	1,430	15.6%	203	2.2%	9,159
30	8,818	56.0%	4,980	31.6%	526	3.3%	1,427	9.1%	15,751
31	9,965	66.5%	3,510	23.4%	667	4.5%	834	5.6%	14,976
32	8,727	64.2%	3,561	26.2%	538	4.0%	757	5.6%	13,583
33	7,763	58.5%	4,137	31.2%	376	2.8%	996	7.5%	13,272
34	5,968	42.6%	4,546	32.5%	3,211	22.9%	281	2.0%	14,006
35	9,110	55.3%	5,480	33.3%	459	2.8%	1,418	8.6%	16,467
36	13,799	64.1%	4,716	21.9%	668	3.1%	2,358	10.9%	21,541
37	8,251	61.3%	3,229	24.0%	1,159	8.6%	816	6.1%	13,455
38	13,082	63.5%	5,097	24.7%	506	2.5%	1,916	9.3%	20,601
39	10,468	59.7%	5,622	32.1%	387	2.2%	1,043	6.0%	17,520
40	8,834	52.4%	6,775	40.2%	425	2.5%	829	4.9%	16,863
41	14,559	62.2%	6,362	27.2%	482	2.1%	2,004	8.6%	23,407
42	9,032	52.9%	6,650	39.0%	944	5.5%	437	2.6%	17,063
43	8,054	36.7%	12,723	57.9%	667	3.0%	520	2.4%	21,964
44	8,166	47.0%	8,112	46.7%	496	2.9%	592	3.4%	17,366
45	12,962	60.2%	6,020	27.9%	566	2.6%	1,992	9.2%	21,540
46	7,231	50.3%	5,978	41.6%	672	4.7%	485	3.4%	14,366
47	11,088	64.2%	4,724	27.3%	553	3.2%	912	5.3%	17,277
48	7,144	48.7%	6,280	42.8%	613	4.2%	628	4.3%	14,665
49	9,432	47.4%	9,158	46.0%	631	3.2%	686	3.4%	19,907
50	11,728	49.6%	10,723	45.3%	518	2.2%	689	2.9%	23,658
Totals	463,717	57.9%	234,470	29.3%	63,479	7.9%	39,703	5.0%	801,369

=== Republican primary ===
Despite Daley being embattled and having health problems, Republicans had difficulty recruiting a candidate to oppose him. US Attorney James R. Thompson had been speculated as a potential Republican contender for 1975, but ultimately did not run. The Republican Party ultimately settled on John Hoellen as a candidate. Hoellen was a longtime foe of Daley, and was, by 1975, the only Republican remaining on the Chicago City Council. Hoellen, however, was a reluctant candidate and was not optimistic of his prospects as a candidate. Hoellen was a "good government"-oriented politician. He hailed from the North Center neighborhood, long a German enclave of the city. A fixture on the City Council, he had been known for his passionate speeches in which he criticized waste, corruption, and inefficiency.

=== Socialist Workers nomination ===
The Socialist Workers Party nominated Willie Mae Reid, who collected 66,000 signatures on her candidature petition to be included on the general election ballot (a greater number of signatures than the number of votes she would ultimately receive).

== General election ==
The election was effectively a rematch of the 1954 Cook County Clerk election in which Daley was challenged by Hoellen. The race was extraordinarily pro forma, with Hoellen rather ambivalent towards the race, and also focused on simultaneous campaigning to retain his aldermanic seat. Hoellen failed to even achieve strong support among fellow Republicans.

=== Results ===
Daley won a majority of the vote in each of the city's 50 wards. Hoellen also lost his re-election campaign for alderman.

Daley's share of the vote was the highest he received in any of his mayoral campaigns.

At the time, it was the second-highest vote share in Chicago mayoral history, behind only James Hutchinson Woodworth's 1849 share of 80.02%. However, it has been subsequently surpassed by Jane Byrne's 1979 share of 82.05% and his own son Richard M. Daley's 2003 share of 78.46%.

Mayor of Chicago 1975 election (General election)
Party	Candidate	Votes	%
Democratic	Richard J. Daley (incumbent)	542,817	77.67
Republican	John J. Hoellen Jr.	139,335	19.94
Socialist Workers	Willie Mae Reid	16,693	2.39
Turnout		698,845	

Results by ward
Ward	Richard J. Daley (Democratic Party)		John J. Hoellen (Republican Party)		Willie Mae Reid (Socialist Workers Party)		Total
Ward	Votes	%	Votes	%	Votes	%	Votes
1	9,455	89.3%	964	9.1%	170	1.6%	10,589
2	7,695	82.6%	1,178	12.6%	446	4.8%	9,319
3	6,657	88.1%	669	8.9%	231	3.1%	7,557
4	8,648	81.8%	1,410	13.3%	520	4.9%	10,578
5	7,000	52.3%	4,494	33.6%	1,890	14.1%	13,384
6	7,733	78.9%	1,512	15.4%	561	5.7%	9,806
7	8,533	75.7%	2,079	18.4%	661	5.9%	11,273
8	7,868	79.0%	1,400	14.1%	686	6.9%	9,954
9	5,428	82.0%	918	13.9%	272	4.1%	6,618
10	11,567	84.4%	1,905	13.9%	232	1.7%	13,704
11	25,554	95.2%	1,209	4.5%	84	0.3%	26,847
12	16,006	84.3%	2,870	15.1%	104	0.5%	18,980
13	20,820	83.5%	4,000	16.0%	111	0.4%	24,931
14	14,180	87.9%	1,849	11.5%	105	0.7%	16,134
15	11,088	83.8%	1,948	14.7%	190	1.4%	13,226
16	6,802	87.9%	632	8.2%	300	3.9%	7,734
17	7,071	80.6%	1,152	13.1%	555	6.3%	8,778
18	13,964	84.7%	2,213	13.4%	315	1.9%	16,492
19	19,195	76.1%	5,779	22.9%	258	1.0%	25,232
20	7,385	83.8%	1,042	11.8%	383	4.3%	8,810
21	8,221	78.1%	1,564	14.9%	741	7.0%	10,526
22	10,056	85.5%	1,543	13.1%	162	1.4%	11,761
23	15,027	80.7%	3,498	18.8%	93	0.5%	18,618
24	7,519	91.2%	502	6.1%	223	2.7%	8,244
25	10,352	91.0%	931	8.2%	87	0.8%	11,370
26	11,927	89.4%	1,308	9.8%	108	0.8%	13,343
27	8,910	93.0%	521	5.4%	153	1.6%	9,584
28	4,766	87.7%	482	8.9%	185	3.4%	5,433
29	5,778	89.7%	486	7.5%	178	2.8%	6,442
30	10,327	73.1%	3,675	26.0%	124	0.9%	14,126
31	13,279	89.7%	1,400	9.5%	131	0.9%	14,810
32	10,362	83.7%	1,901	15.3%	124	1.0%	12,387
33	8,150	74.0%	2,724	24.7%	135	1.2%	11,009
34	7,435	83.0%	1,041	11.6%	483	5.4%	8,959
35	12,107	67.4%	5,593	31.1%	271	1.5%	17,971
36	16,991	76.8%	4,989	22.5%	151	0.7%	22,131
37	9,624	82.7%	1,813	15.6%	201	1.7%	11,638
38	15,626	73.2%	5,585	26.2%	144	0.7%	21,355
39	11,676	71.6%	4,469	27.4%	167	1.0%	16,312
40	9,905	67.4%	4,508	30.7%	278	1.9%	14,691
41	16,281	68.2%	7,443	31.2%	164	0.7%	23,888
42	10,016	73.0%	3,325	24.2%	379	2.8%	13,720
43	9,592	53.7%	6,908	38.7%	1,350	7.6%	17,850
44	8,240	68.2%	3,452	28.6%	395	3.3%	12,087
45	15,844	67.6%	7,373	31.4%	233	1.0%	23,450
46	7,602	70.6%	2,853	26.5%	312	2.9%	10,767
47	11,589	62.9%	6,669	36.2%	172	0.9%	18,430
48	9,367	62.3%	5,137	34.2%	532	3.5%	15,036
49	9,684	68.8%	3,812	27.1%	579	4.1%	14,075
50	13,929	74.1%	4,495	23.9%	369	2.0%	18,793
Totals	542,831	77.7%	139,223	19.9%	16,698	2.4%	698,752
