= Richard H. Newhouse Jr. =

American politician

Richard Newhouse
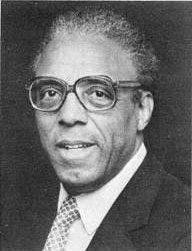
- official portrait, circa 1981

Member of the Illinois Senate
- In office 1967–1991
- Preceded by: Everett Peters (24th District); Dawn Clark Netsch (13th District)
- Succeeded by: LeRoy Lemke (24th District); Alice Palmer (13th District)
- Constituency: 24th District (1967–1983); 13th District (1983–1991)

Personal details
- Born: Richard H. Newhouse Jr. January 24, 1924 Louisville, Kentucky, U.S.
- Died: April 24, 2002 (aged 78) Chicago, Illinois, U.S.
- Party: Democratic
- Education: Boston University (BA, MA); University of Chicago (JD)

Military service
- Branch/service: United States Army
- Battles/wars: World War II

Richard H. Newhouse Jr. (January 24, 1924 – April 24, 2002) was an American attorney and politician who served as a member of the Illinois Senate.

== Early life and education ==
Born in Louisville, Kentucky, he served as a staff sergeant in the United States Army Air Forces during World War II. He then received his bachelor's and master's degree from Boston University. Newhouse then received his J.D. degree from University of Chicago Law School.

== Career ==
Newhouse moved to Chicago, Illinois and worked at The Chicago Defender. After graduating from law school, he worked as a staff attorney for the United States Department of Housing and Urban Development. He was a Democrat. From 1967 until 1991, Newhouse served in the Illinois State Senate. In 1975, Newhouse was the first African American to run for Mayor of Chicago, losing to incumbent Mayor Richard J. Daley in the Democratic Party primary.

== Death ==
Newhouse died at his home in Hyde Park of heart failure.
