= W. Robert Blair =

American politician and businessman (1930-2014)

Bob Blair
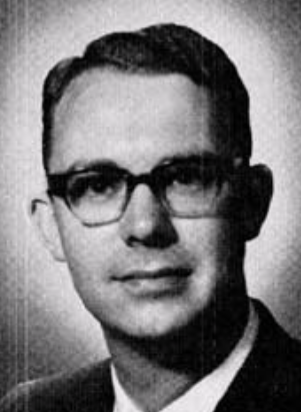

63rd Speaker of the Illinois House of Representatives
- In office 1971–1975
- Preceded by: Jack Walker
- Succeeded by: Bill Redmond

Personal details
- Born: William Robert Blair II; October 22, 1930 Clarksburg, West Virginia
- Died: January 18, 2014 (aged 83) Chicago, Illinois
- Party: Republican
- Education: West Virginia University

Military service
- Allegiance: United States
- Branch/service: (United States Air Force) Air Force
- Time: 1956-1958
- Rank: Lieutenant
- Unit: JAG Corps

William Robert Blair II (October 22, 1930 – January 18, 2014) was an American politician, lawyer, and businessman.

== Early life ==
William Robert Blair II was born in Clarksburg, West Virginia, on October 22, 1930. He was graduated from West Virginia University in 1954, with A.B. and LL.B. degrees. He then served in the United States Air Force Judge Advocate General's Corps for two years at Chanute Air Force Base. He moved to Park Forest, Illinois in 1957. He became active in local Will County politics as a member of the Will County Public Building Commission and a precinct committeeman the Will County Republican Central Committee. During his early legal career, he served as house counsel for Swift & Company and as a partner of Wood & Blair, while also serving as President of Fairfax Realty Company.

== Illinois House of Representatives ==
The 1960 reapportionment process was stalled by partisan gridlock. Subsequently, the Illinois Supreme Court ordered an at large election for all 177 members of the Illinois House in 1964. Voters were given ballots three feet long. Blair was one of fifty-nine Republicans elected to 177 seats. Blair was a and served in the Illinois House of Representatives from 1965 to 1975.

After a 1965 Illinois Supreme Court Case to resolve the redistricting issue, Blair's home was drawn into the 41st district which consisted of Wheatland, DuPage, Plainfield, Lockport, Homer, Troy, Joliet, New Lenox, Frankfort, Manhattan, Green Garden, Monee, Crete, Wilton, Peotone, Will, Washington, townships in Will County. Blair was elected as one of the district's three representatives alongside William G. Barr and John J. Houlihan.

He served as speaker during the 77th and 78th Illinois General Assemblies. He was not reelected in the 1974 general election. After his time in the legislature, he served as a public member of the Illinois Transportation Study Commission.

== Post-legislative career ==
In 1978, he was a candidate for the Republican nomination for Illinois Comptroller. Blair ran against John W. Castle, director of the Department of Local Government Affairs for Governor James R. Thompson. Thompson, who had convinced Castle to run for Comptroller instead of Treasurer, endorsed Castle leading Blair to criticize Castle for an inability to do the job independently. With more than 52% of the vote, Castle defeated Blair in the Republican primary. In 1982, he ran for the Republican nomination for Illinois Treasurer. He lost the primary to Peoria businessman John Dailey.

Blair died January 18, 2014.

== Notes ==
Illinois House of Representatives
Preceded by At-large district created	Member of the Illinois House of Representatives from the at-large district 1965–1967	Succeeded by At-large district abolished
Preceded by At-large district abolished	Member of the Illinois House of Representatives from the 41st district 1967–1973; Served alongside: John J. Houlihan, William G. Barr, George M. O'Brien	Succeeded by George R. Hudson; Goudyloch E. Dyer; J. Glenn Schneider
Preceded by James R. Washburn; Thomas R. Houde; C. R. "Russ" Hamilton	Member of the Illinois House of Representatives from the 42nd district 1973–1975; Served alongside: George E. Sangmeister, Harry Leinenweber	Succeeded by LeRoy Van Duyne
Political offices
Preceded by Jack E. Walker	Speaker of the Illinois House of Representatives; 1971–1975	Succeeded by William A. Redmond
