= Harry Leinenweber =

American judge (1937–2024)

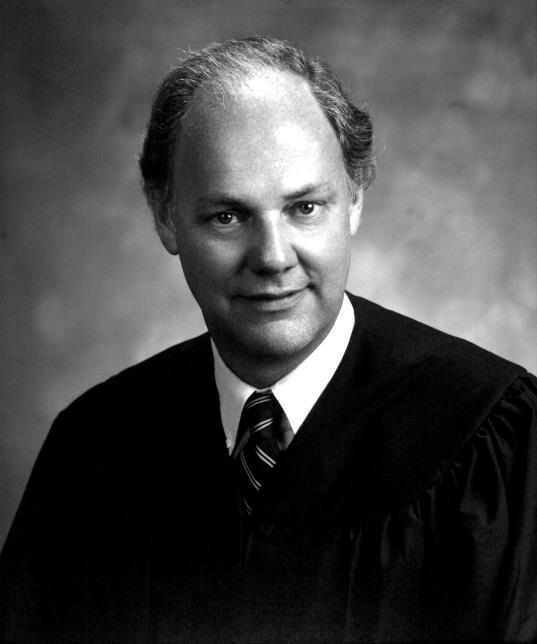

Senior Judge of the United States District Court for the Northern District of Illinois
- In office June 3, 2002 – June 11, 2024

Judge of the United States District Court for the Northern District of Illinois
- In office December 17, 1985 – June 3, 2002
- Appointed by: Ronald Reagan
- Preceded by: Seat est. by 98 Stat. 333
- Succeeded by: Mark Filip

Member of the Illinois House of Representatives from the 42nd district
- In office January 1973 – January 1983 Serving with W. Robert Blair, George Sangmeister, LeRoy Van Duyne, Jack Davis
- Preceded by: James R. Washburn; Thomas R. Houde; C. R. "Russ" Hamilton
- Succeeded by: Suzanne Deuchler

Personal details
- Born: Harry Daniel Leinenweber; June 3, 1937 Joliet, Illinois, U.S.
- Died: June 11, 2024 (aged 87) Chicago, Illinois, U.S.
- Party: Republican
- Spouse: Lynn M. Martin (m. 1987)
- Children: 5
- Education: University of Notre Dame (BA); University of Chicago (JD)

Harry Daniel Leinenweber (June 3, 1937 – June 11, 2024) was an American jurist who served as a United States district judge of the United States District Court for the Northern District of Illinois.

== Education and career ==
Leinenweber was born in Joliet, Illinois. He received a Bachelor of Arts degree from the University of Notre Dame in 1959 and a J.D. degree from the University of Chicago Law School in 1962. He was in private practice in Joliet from 1962 to 1986. He was a city attorney of Joliet from 1963 to 1967. He was a special prosecutor in Will County, Illinois from 1968 to 1970. He was a special counsel for the Village of Bolingbrook, Illinois, from 1975 to 1977. He was a special counsel for Will County Forest Preserve, Illinois in 1977. He was a Republican member of the Illinois House of Representatives from 1973 to 1983.

=== Federal judicial service ===
Leinenweber was nominated by President Ronald Reagan on November 7, 1985, to the United States District Court for the Northern District of Illinois, to a new seat created by 98 Stat. 333. He was confirmed by the United States Senate on December 16, 1985, and received his commission on December 17, 1985. He assumed senior status on June 3, 2002.

In 1998, Leinenweber sentenced Larry Hoover, a leader of the Gangster Disciples, to multiple concurrent life terms on federal charges for directing a criminal enterprise from prison while serving a sentence for an Illinois murder conviction. In 2021, Leinenweber denied Hoover’s motion for a sentence reduction under the First Step Act, and on May 28, 2025, Hoover’s federal life sentences were commuted by President Donald Trump, following public advocacy for clemency by several figures, including musician Kanye West.

In January 2013, Leinenweber sentenced DEA informant David Headley to serve 35 years for his involvement in the 2008 Mumbai attacks, and the plot against Danish media outlet Jyllands-Posten for the publication of cartoons of Muhammad. During the sentencing, Leinenweber called Headley a terrorist and said he hoped he would die in prison, telling him he deserved to be executed.

In 2017, Leinenweber issued a nationwide injunction barring the Trump administration from enforcing its policy regarding so-called sanctuary cities, ruling in favor of the City of Chicago in its suit against Attorney General Jeff Sessions after finding that the policy violated the separation of powers doctrine by intruding on Congress’s authority.

In 2022, Leinenweber presided over R. Kelly's sexual abuse trial in Northern Illinois. At the time of his death, he had been presiding over the ComEd corruption trial involving Anne Pramaggiore, which he had placed on hold in early 2024.

== Personal life ==
Leinenweber married Representative Lynn M. Martin in Washington, D.C., on January 7, 1987.

== Death ==
Leinenweber died of lung cancer at his Gold Coast home, in Chicago, on June 11, 2024, at the age of 87.

== Sources ==
Illinois House of Representatives
Preceded by James R. Washburn; Thomas R. Houde; C. R. "Russ" Hamilton	Member of the Illinois House of Representatives from the 42nd district 1973–1983; Served alongside: W. Robert Blair, George Sangmeister, LeRoy Van Duyne, Jack Davis	Succeeded by Suzanne Deuchler (redistrcting)
Legal offices
Preceded by Seat established by 98 Stat. 333	Judge of the United States District Court for the Northern District of Illinois; 1985–2002	Succeeded by Mark Filip
