= George M. O'Brien =

American politician (1917–1986)

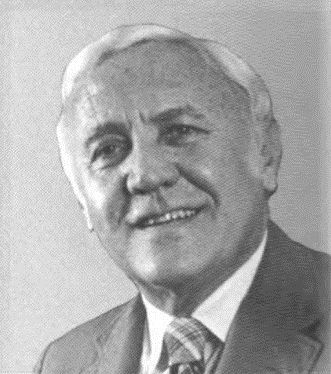

Member of the U.S. House of Representatives from Illinois
- In office January 3, 1973 – July 17, 1986
- Preceded by: New Constituency (Redistricting)
- Succeeded by: Jack Davis
- Constituency: 17th District (1973-1983); 4th District (1983-1986)

Member of the Illinois House of Representatives from the 41st district
- In office January 13, 1971 – January 3, 1973 Serving with John J. Houlihan, W. Robert Blair
- Preceded by: William G. Barr
- Succeeded by: George R. Hudson; Goudyloch E. Dyer; J. Glenn Schneider

Personal details
- Born: June 17, 1917 Chicago, Illinois, U.S.
- Died: July 17, 1986 (aged 69) Bethesda, Maryland, U.S.
- Party: Republican
- Education: Northwestern University (BA); Yale University (LLB)

George Miller O'Brien (June 17, 1917 – July 17, 1986) was a Republican member of the United States House of Representatives. He represented Illinois' 17th and 4th districts from 1973 until his death from prostate cancer in Bethesda, Maryland in 1986.

O'Brien was born in Chicago, Illinois, to a middle-class Irish Catholic family. He attended a private Catholic school before entering Northwestern University. He was a member of the Sigma Chi fraternity. O'Brien earned a law degree from Yale Law School in 1947. However, he did not get to practice law until returning from World War II. During the war, O'Brien rose to the rank of lieutenant colonel while fighting in Germany. Beginning in 1946, he practiced law privately. In 1970, he was appointed to the state's Legislative Advisory Committee, and in 1971 he was elected to the Illinois House of Representatives.

After just one term in the state House, O'Brien successfully ran for Congress in 1973. O'Brien was a centrist who was popular among members of both parties. Following redistricting in 1982, he and fellow Republican Ed Derwinski were drawn into the same district. The redrawn district retained Derwinski's number, the 4th, and Derwinski had 14 years more seniority than O'Brien. However, the new district was geographically more O'Brien's district than Derwinski's. O'Brien won the primary, and then general elections. In April 1986, O'Brien discovered that he had prostate cancer, which forced him to give up his bid for an eighth term. He succumbed to the disease just two months later. Fellow Illinois Republican Congressman John E. Grotberg too died of cancer just four months later.

== See also ==
- List of members of the United States Congress who died in office (1950–1999)

Illinois House of Representatives
Preceded by William G. Barr	Member of the Illinois House of Representatives from the 41st district 1971–1973; Served alongside: John J. Houlihan, W. Robert Blair	Succeeded by George R. Hudson; Goudyloch E. Dyer; J. Glenn Schneider
U.S. House of Representatives
Preceded by Leslie C. Arends	U.S. Representative of Illinois' 17th congressional district 1973–1983	Succeeded by Lane Evans
Preceded by Ed Derwinski	U.S. Representative of Illinois' 4th congressional district 1983–1986	Succeeded by Jack Davis
