= 99th United States Congress =

1985–1987 U.S. Congress

←	98th	100th	→
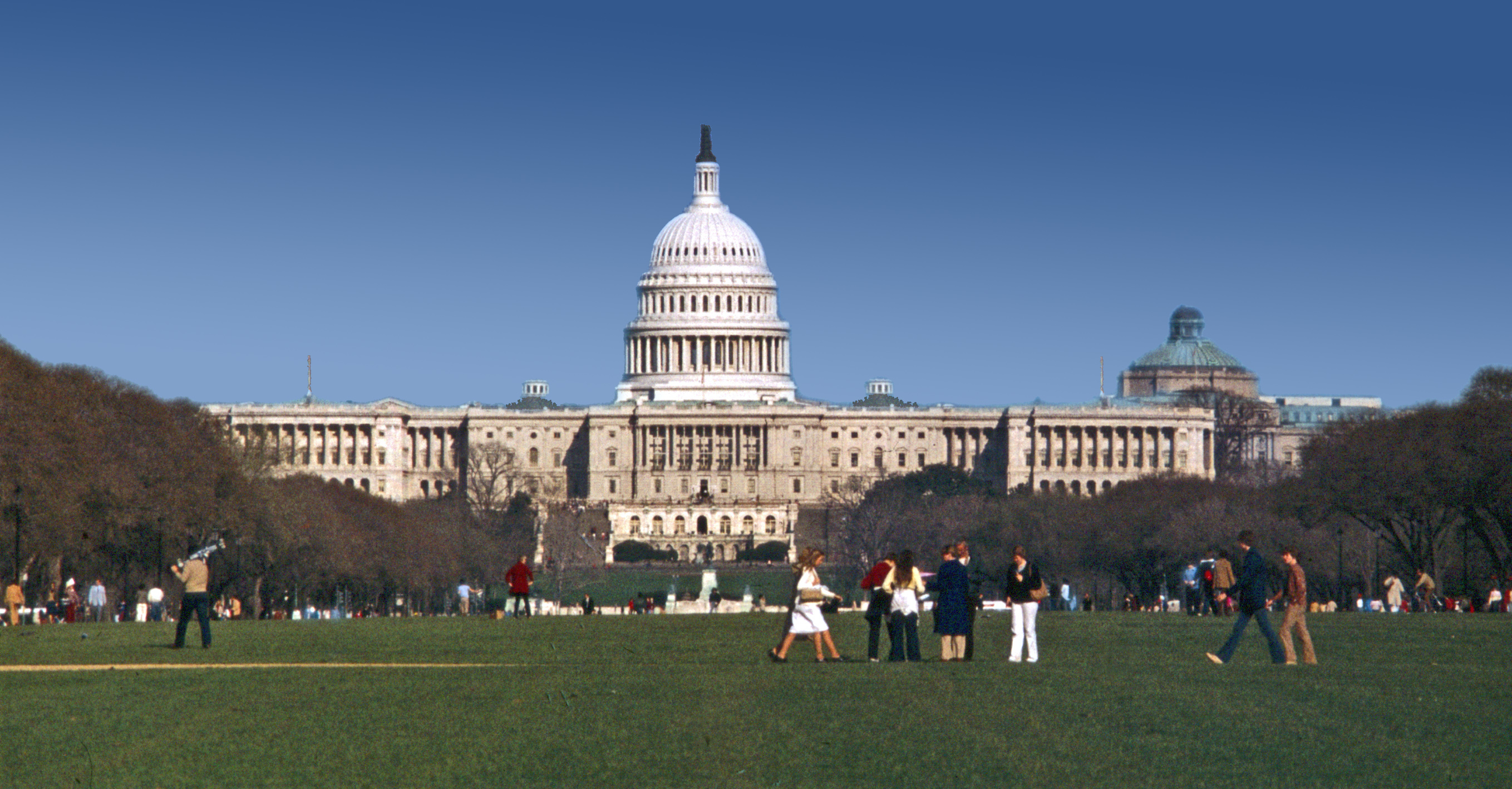
- United States Capitol (1980)

Overview
- Legislative body: United States Congress
- Jurisdiction: United States
- Term: January 3, 1985 – January 3, 1987

Senate
- Members: 100
- President: George H. W. Bush (R)
- President pro tempore: Strom Thurmond (R)
- Party control: Republican

House of Representatives
- Members: 435 representatives 5 non-voting delegates
- Speaker: Tip O'Neill (D)
- Party control: Democratic

Sessions
- 1st: January 3, 1985 – December 20, 1985
- 2nd: January 21, 1986 – October 18, 1986

The 99th United States Congress was a meeting of the legislative branch of the United States federal government, composed of the United States Senate and the United States House of Representatives. It met in Washington, D.C., from January 3, 1985, to January 3, 1987, during the fifth and sixth years of Ronald Reagan's presidency. The apportionment of seats in the House of Representatives was based on the 1980 United States census.

The Republicans maintained control of the Senate, while the Democrats maintained control of the House of Representatives – albeit with both majorities slightly reduced from the 98th Congress.

This is the most recent Congress to feature a Republican senator from Maryland, Charles Mathias, who retired at the end of the Congress.

This is also the most recent Congress in which no Democratic women Senators served and the most recent Congress in which more Republican women Senators served than Democratic women Senators.

This was the last session of Congress to feature a Republican Senate/Democratic House split until the 116th in 2019.

== Major events ==
- January 20, 1985: Ronald Reagan was privately sworn in for a second term as president (publicly sworn in, January 21).
- January 28, 1986: Space Shuttle Challenger disaster: Destruction of the shuttle and death of the crew shortly after lift-off.
- April 15, 1986: Operation El Dorado Canyon: At least 15 people die after United States planes bomb targets in the Libyan capital, Tripoli, and the Benghazi region.
- June 2, 1986: First regular television broadcast of Senate proceedings on C-SPAN2.
- October 21, 1986: The Marshall Islands achieved independence from U.S.-administered UN Trusteeship and became an associated state under the Compact of Free Association.
- November 3, 1986: The Federated States of Micronesia achieved independence from U.S.-administered UN Trusteeship and became an associated state under the Compact of Free Association.
- November 3, 1986: Iran–Contra affair: The Lebanese magazine Ash-Shiraa reported that the United States has been selling weapons to Iran in secret to secure the release of American hostages held by pro-Iranian groups in Lebanon.
- November 4, 1986: 1986 United States elections; Congressional Democrats regained (+8) their Senate majority (55-45), and slightly increased (+5) their House majority (258-177).

== Major legislation ==
- December 12, 1985: Balanced Budget and Emergency Deficit Control Act of 1985 (Gramm–Rudman–Hollings Balanced Budget Act) Pub. L. 99–177 (title II)
- December 17, 1985: Gold Bullion Coin Act of 1985, Pub. L. 99–185
- April 7, 1986: Consolidated Omnibus Budget Reconciliation Act of 1985 (COBRA) Pub. L. 99–272 (including Emergency Medical Treatment and Active Labor Act)
- May 19, 1986: Firearm Owners Protection Act, Pub. L. 99–308
- August 28, 1986: Uniformed and Overseas Citizens Absentee Voting Act, Pub. L. 99–410, 100 Stat. 924
- October 1, 1986: Goldwater–Nichols Act (Defense Reorganization), Pub. L. 99–433
- October 2, 1986: Comprehensive Anti-Apartheid Act, Pub. L. 99–440
- October 17, 1986: Emergency Planning and Community Right-to-Know Act, Pub. L. 99–499 (title III)
- October 21, 1986: Electronic Communications Privacy Act, Pub. L. 99–508
- October 21, 1986: Stored Communications Act, Pub. L. 99–508, 100 Stat. 1848
- October 22, 1986: Tax Reform Act of 1986, Pub. L. 99–514
- October 27, 1986: Anti-Drug Abuse Act of 1986, Pub. L. 99–570
- October 27, 1986: Money Laundering Control Act, Pub. L. 99–570, 100 Stat. 3207
- October 31, 1986: Age Discrimination in Employment Act of 1986, Pub. L. 99–592
- November 6, 1986: Immigration Reform and Control Act of 1986 (Simpson-Mazzoli Act), Pub. L. 99–603, S. 1200
- November 10, 1986: Emergency Wetlands Resources Act, Pub. L. 99–645, 100 Stat. 3582
- November 14, 1986: National Childhood Vaccine Injury Act, Pub. L. 99–660
- November 17, 1986: Water Resources Development Act of 1986, Pub. L. 99–662

== Party summary ==
=== Senate ===
Party standings on the opening day of the 99th Congress 47 Democratic senators 53 Republican senators

	Party (shading shows control)		Total	Vacant
	Democratic (D)	Republican (R)	Total	Vacant
End of previous congress	45	55	100	0
Begin	46	53	99	1
End	48	52	100	0
Final voting share	48.0%	52.0%		
Beginning of next congress	55	45	100	0

=== House of Representatives ===
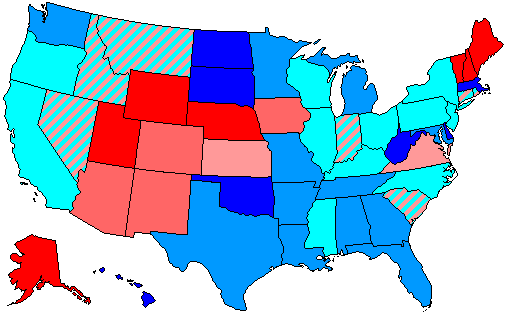
House seats by party holding majority in state: 80–100% Republican / 80–100% Democratic; 60–80% Republican / 60–80% Democratic; 50–60% Republican / 50–60% Democratic; striped: evenly split

	Party (shading shows control)			Total	Vacant
	Democratic (D)	Republican (R)	Conservative (C)	Total	Vacant
End of previous congress	267	166	1	434	1
Begin	252	181	1	434	1
End	251	180	0	431	4
Final voting share	58.2%	41.8%	0.0%		
Beginning of next congress	258	177	0	435	0

== Leadership ==
=== Senate ===
Senate President

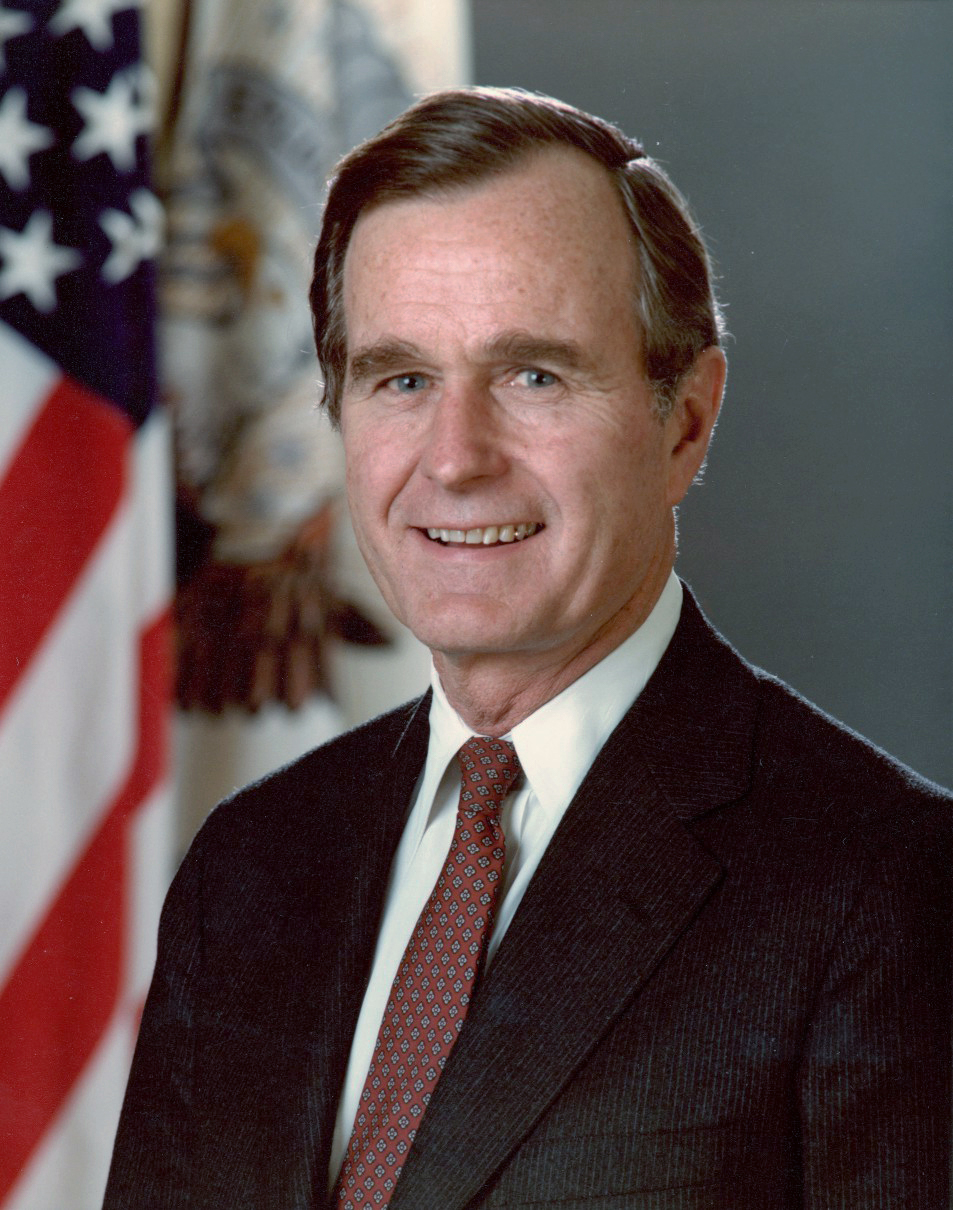
George H. W. Bush (R)

Senate President pro tempore

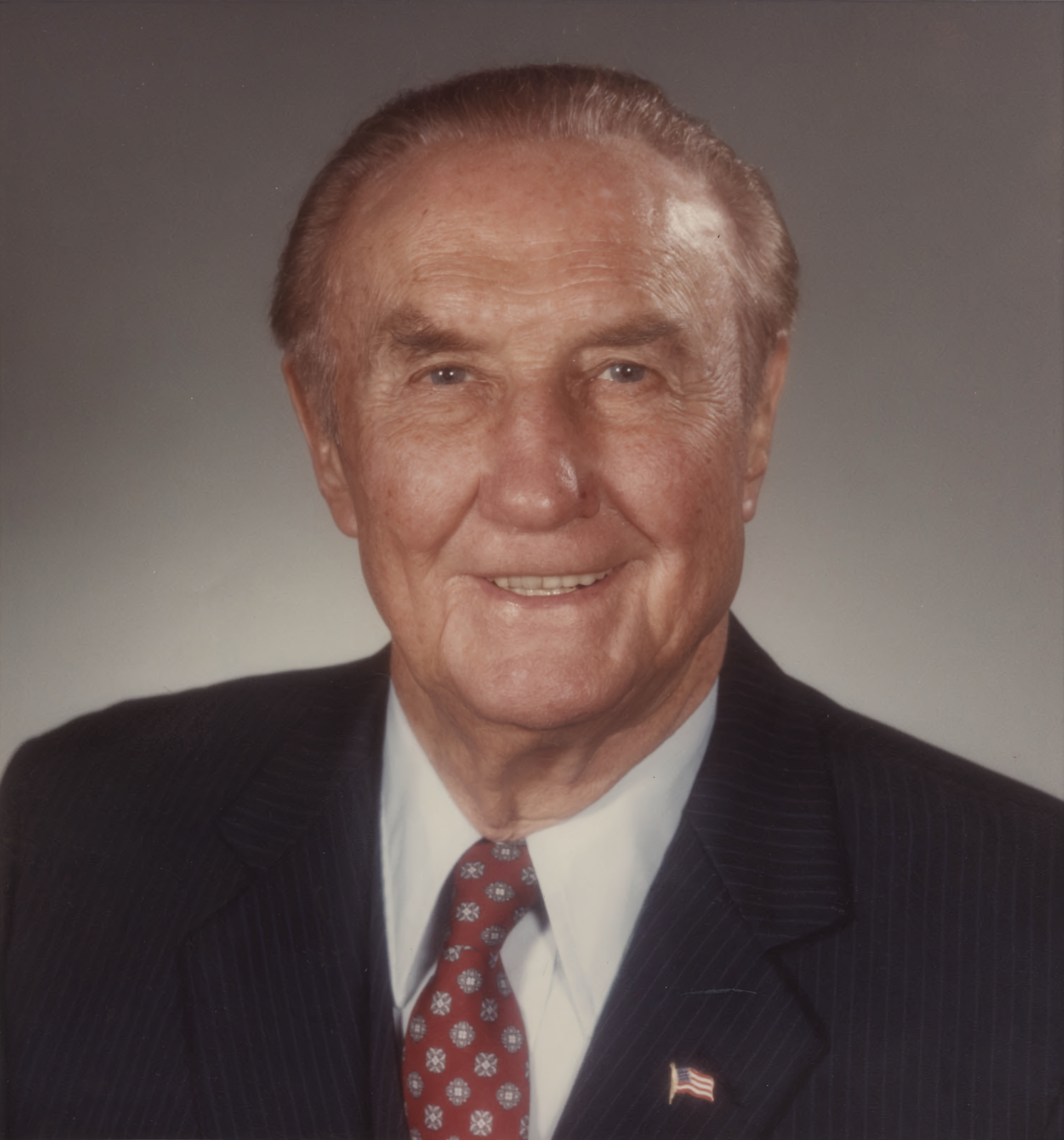
Strom Thurmond (R)

- President: George H. W. Bush (R)
- President pro tempore: Strom Thurmond (R)

==== Majority (Republican) leadership ====
- Majority Leader: Bob Dole
- Majority Whip: Alan Simpson
- Republican Conference Chairman: John Chafee
- Republican Conference Secretary: Thad Cochran
- National Senatorial Committee Chair: John Heinz
- Policy Committee Chairman: William L. Armstrong

==== Minority (Democratic) leadership ====
- Minority Leader: Robert Byrd
- Minority Whip: Alan Cranston
- Democratic Caucus Secretary: Daniel Inouye
- Democratic Campaign Committee Chairman: George J. Mitchell

=== House of Representatives ===
House Speaker

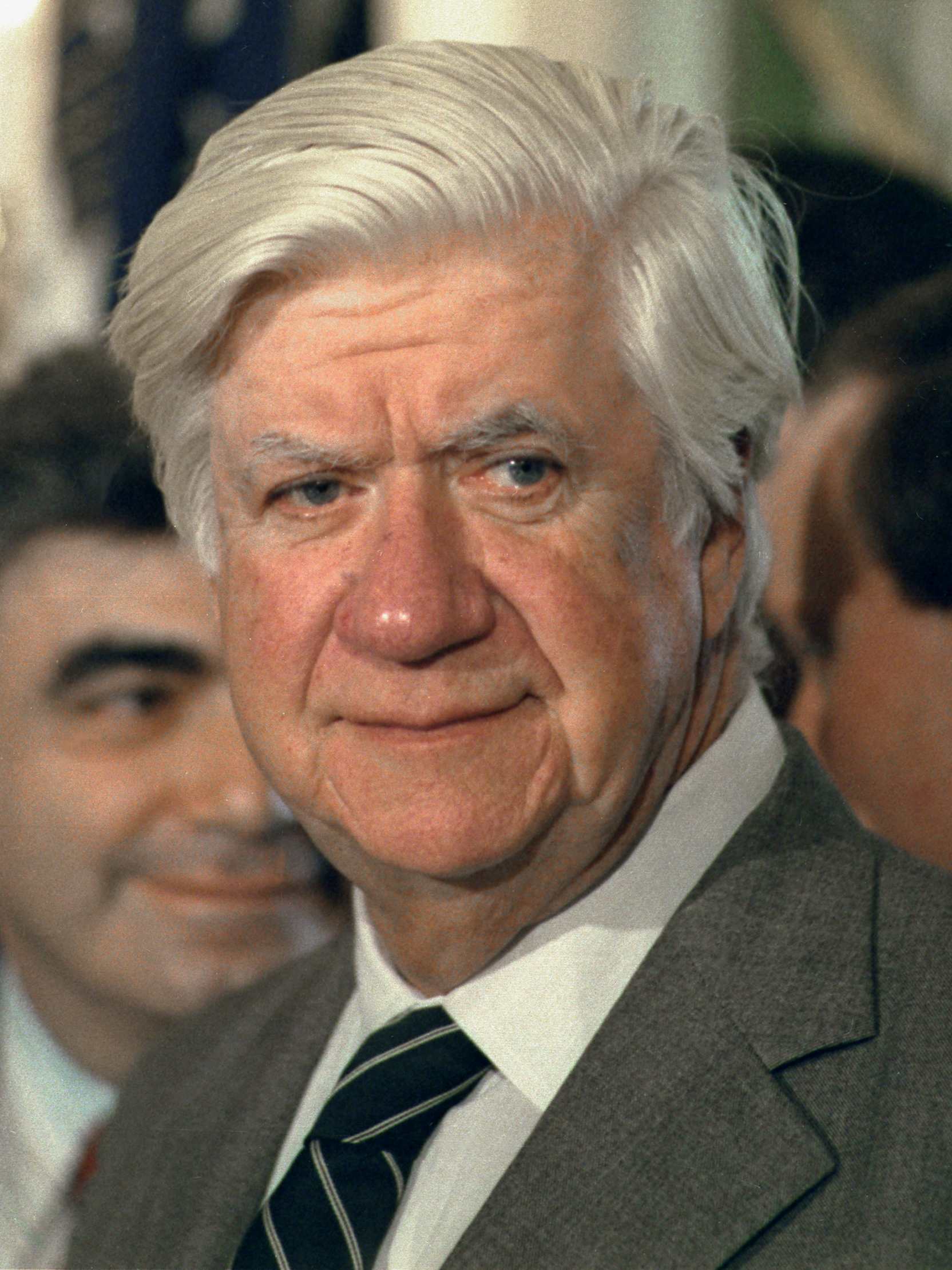
Tip O'Neill (D)

- Speaker: Tip O'Neill (D)

==== Majority (Democratic) leadership ====
- Majority Leader: Jim Wright
- Majority Whip: Tom Foley
- Chief Deputy Majority Whip: William Vollie Alexander Jr.
- Democratic Caucus Chairman: Dick Gephardt
- Democratic Caucus Secretary: Mary Rose Oakar
- Democratic Campaign Committee Chairman: Tony Coelho

==== Minority (Republican) leadership ====
- Minority Leader: Robert H. Michel
- Minority Whip: Trent Lott
- Chief Deputy Whip: Tom Loeffler
- Republican Conference Chairman: Jack Kemp
- Republican Conference Vice-Chairman: Lynn Morley Martin
- Republican Conference Secretary: Robert J. Lagomarsino
- Policy Committee Chairman: Dick Cheney
- Republican Campaign Committee Chairman: Guy Vander Jagt

== Caucuses ==
- Congressional Arts Caucus
- Congressional Automotive Caucus
- Congressional Black Caucus
- Congressional Friends of Ireland Caucus
- Congressional Hispanic Caucus
- Congressional Pediatric & Adult Hydrocephalus Caucus
- Congressional Travel & Tourism Caucus
- Congresswomen's Caucus
- House Democratic Caucus
- Senate Democratic Caucus

== Members ==
This list is arranged by chamber, then by state. Senators are listed by class, and representatives are listed by district.

=== Senate ===
Senators are popularly elected statewide every six years, with one-third beginning new six-year terms with each Congress, In this Congress, Class 3 meant their term ended with this Congress, facing re-election in 1986; Class 1 meant their term began in the last Congress, facing re-election in 1988; and Class 2 meant their term began in this Congress, facing re-election in 1990.

==== Alabama ====
▌2. Howell Heflin (D)
▌3. Jeremiah Denton (R)

==== Alaska ====
▌2. Ted Stevens (R)
▌3. Frank Murkowski (R)

==== Arizona ====
▌1. Dennis DeConcini (D)
▌3. Barry Goldwater (R)

==== Arkansas ====
▌2. David Pryor (D)
▌3. Dale Bumpers (D)

==== California ====
▌1. Pete Wilson (R)
▌3. Alan Cranston (D)

==== Colorado ====
▌2. William L. Armstrong (R)
▌3. Gary Hart (D)

==== Connecticut ====
▌1. Lowell Weicker (R)
▌3. Chris Dodd (D)

==== Delaware ====
▌1. William Roth (R)
▌2. Joe Biden (D)

==== Florida ====
▌1. Lawton Chiles (D)
▌3. Paula Hawkins (R)

==== Georgia ====
▌2. Sam Nunn (D)
▌3. Mack Mattingly (R)

==== Hawaii ====
▌1. Spark Matsunaga (D)
▌3. Daniel Inouye (D)

==== Idaho ====
▌2. James A. McClure (R)
▌3. Steve Symms (R)

==== Illinois ====
▌2. Paul Simon (D)
▌3. Alan J. Dixon (D)

==== Indiana ====
▌1. Richard Lugar (R)
▌3. Dan Quayle (R)

==== Iowa ====
▌2. Tom Harkin (D)
▌3. Chuck Grassley (R)

==== Kansas ====
▌2. Nancy Kassebaum (R)
▌3. Bob Dole (R)

==== Kentucky ====
▌2. Mitch McConnell (R)
▌3. Wendell Ford (D)

==== Louisiana ====
▌2. J. Bennett Johnston (D)
▌3. Russell B. Long (D)

==== Maine ====
▌1. George J. Mitchell (D)
▌2. William Cohen (R)

==== Maryland ====
▌1. Paul Sarbanes (D)
▌3. Charles Mathias (R)

==== Massachusetts ====
▌1. Ted Kennedy (D)
▌2. John Kerry (D)

==== Michigan ====
▌1. Donald Riegle (D)
▌2. Carl Levin (D)

==== Minnesota ====
▌1. David Durenberger (I-R) (Note: The Republican Party of Minnesota was officially known as the Independent-Republicans of Minnesota from November 15, 1975, until September 23, 1995, and are counted as Republicans.)
▌2. Rudy Boschwitz (I-R)

==== Mississippi ====
▌1. John C. Stennis (D)
▌2. Thad Cochran (R)

==== Missouri ====
▌1. John Danforth (R)
▌3. Thomas Eagleton (D)

==== Montana ====
▌1. John Melcher (D)
▌2. Max Baucus (D)

==== Nebraska ====
▌1. Edward Zorinsky (D)
▌2. J. James Exon (D)

==== Nevada ====
▌1. Chic Hecht (R)
▌3. Paul Laxalt (R)

==== New Hampshire ====
▌2. Gordon J. Humphrey (R)
▌3. Warren Rudman (R)

==== New Jersey ====
▌1. Frank Lautenberg (D)
▌2. Bill Bradley (D)

==== New Mexico ====
▌1. Jeff Bingaman (D)
▌2. Pete Domenici (R)

==== New York ====
▌1. Daniel Patrick Moynihan (D)
▌3. Al D'Amato (R)

==== North Carolina ====
▌2. Jesse Helms (R)
▌3. John Porter East (R), until June 29, 1986

▌Jim Broyhill (R), from July 14 to November 4, 1986
▌Terry Sanford (D), from November 5, 1986

==== North Dakota ====
▌1. Quentin Burdick (D-NPL) (Note: The Minnesota Democratic–Farmer–Labor Party (DFL) and the North Dakota Democratic-Nonpartisan League Party (D-NPL) are the Minnesota and North Dakota affiliates of the U.S. Democratic Party and are counted as Democrats.)
▌3. Mark Andrews (R)

==== Ohio ====
▌1. Howard Metzenbaum (D)
▌3. John Glenn (D)

==== Oklahoma ====
▌2. David Boren (D)
▌3. Don Nickles (R)

==== Oregon ====
▌2. Mark Hatfield (R)
▌3. Bob Packwood (R)

==== Pennsylvania ====
▌1. John Heinz (R)
▌3. Arlen Specter (R)

==== Rhode Island ====
▌1. John Chafee (R)
▌2. Claiborne Pell (D)

==== South Carolina ====
▌2. Strom Thurmond (R)
▌3. Fritz Hollings (D)

==== South Dakota ====
▌2. Larry Pressler (R)
▌3. James Abdnor (R)

==== Tennessee ====
▌1. Jim Sasser (D)
▌2. Al Gore (D)

==== Texas ====
▌1. Lloyd Bentsen (D)
▌2. Phil Gramm (R)

==== Utah ====
▌1. Orrin Hatch (R)
▌3. Jake Garn (R)

==== Vermont ====
▌1. Robert Stafford (R)
▌3. Patrick Leahy (D)

==== Virginia ====
▌1. Paul Trible (R)
▌2. John Warner (R)

==== Washington ====
▌1. Daniel J. Evans (R)
▌3. Slade Gorton (R)

==== West Virginia ====
▌1. Robert Byrd (D)
▌2. Jay Rockefeller (D), from January 15, 1985

==== Wisconsin ====
▌1. William Proxmire (D)
▌3. Bob Kasten (R)

==== Wyoming ====
▌1. Malcolm Wallop (R)
▌2. Alan Simpson (R)

Senators' party membership by state at the opening of the 99th Congress in January 1985 2 Democrats 1 Democrat and 1 Republican 2 Republicans

Senate majority leadership

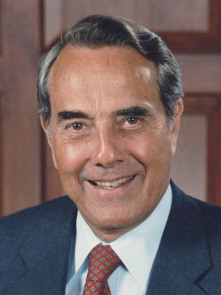
Republican leader
Bob Dole

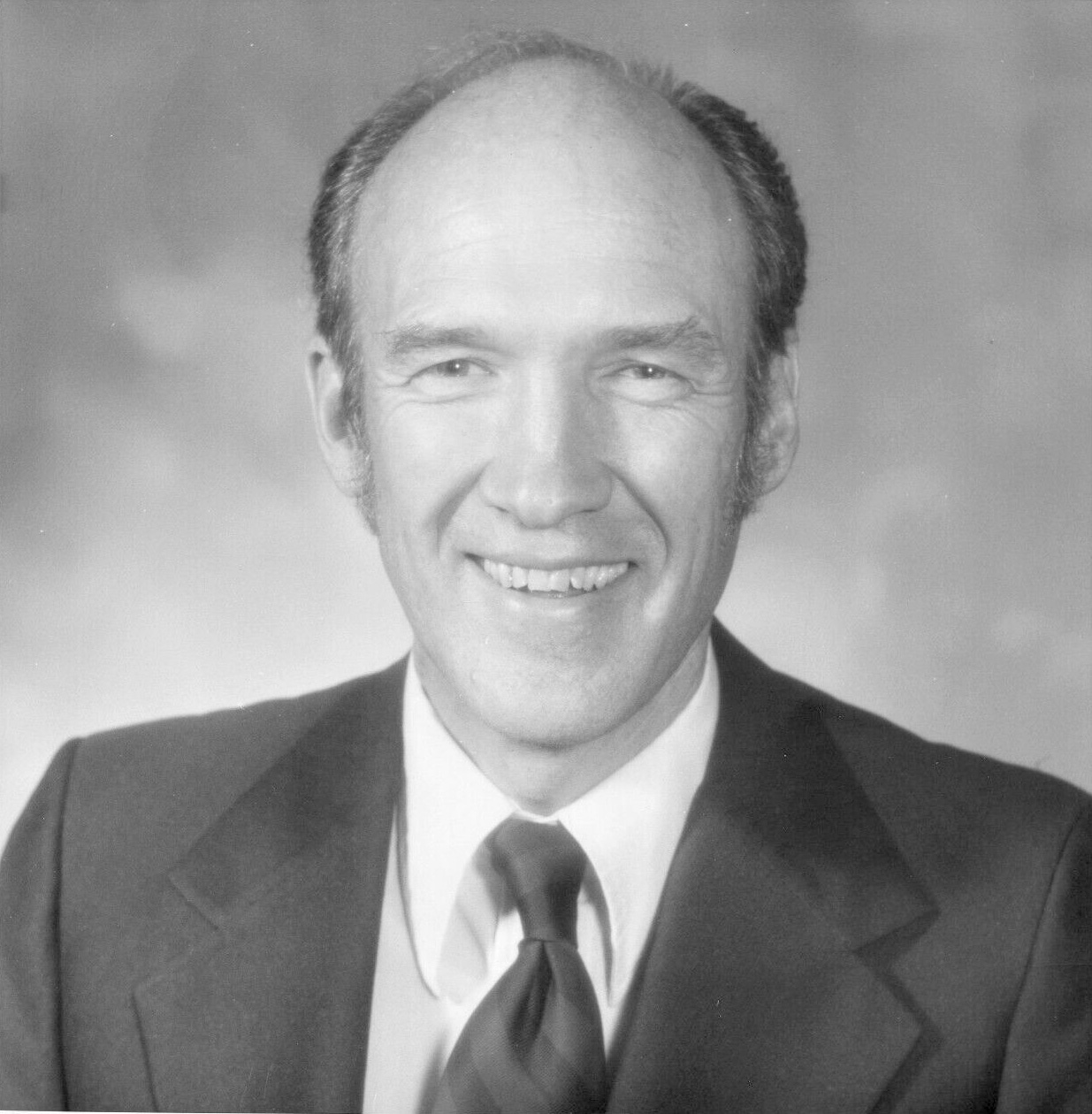
Republican whip
Alan Simpson

Senate minority leadership

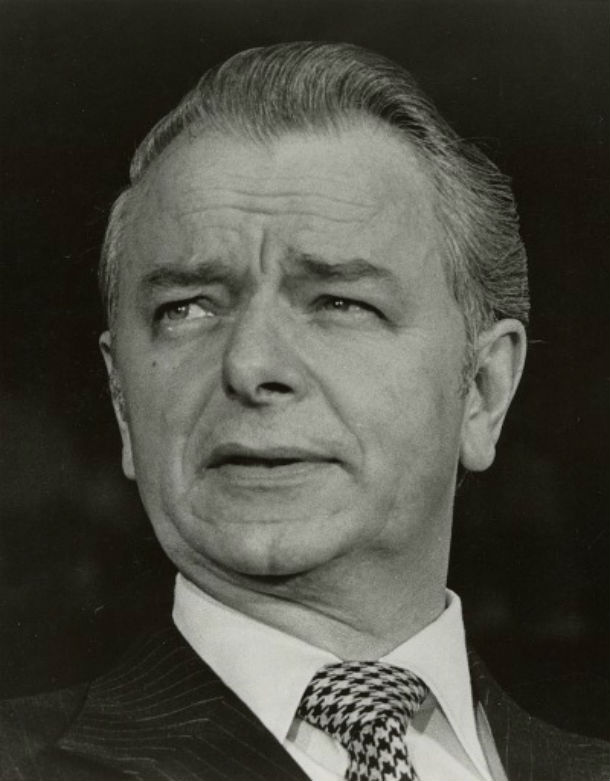
Democratic leader
Robert Byrd

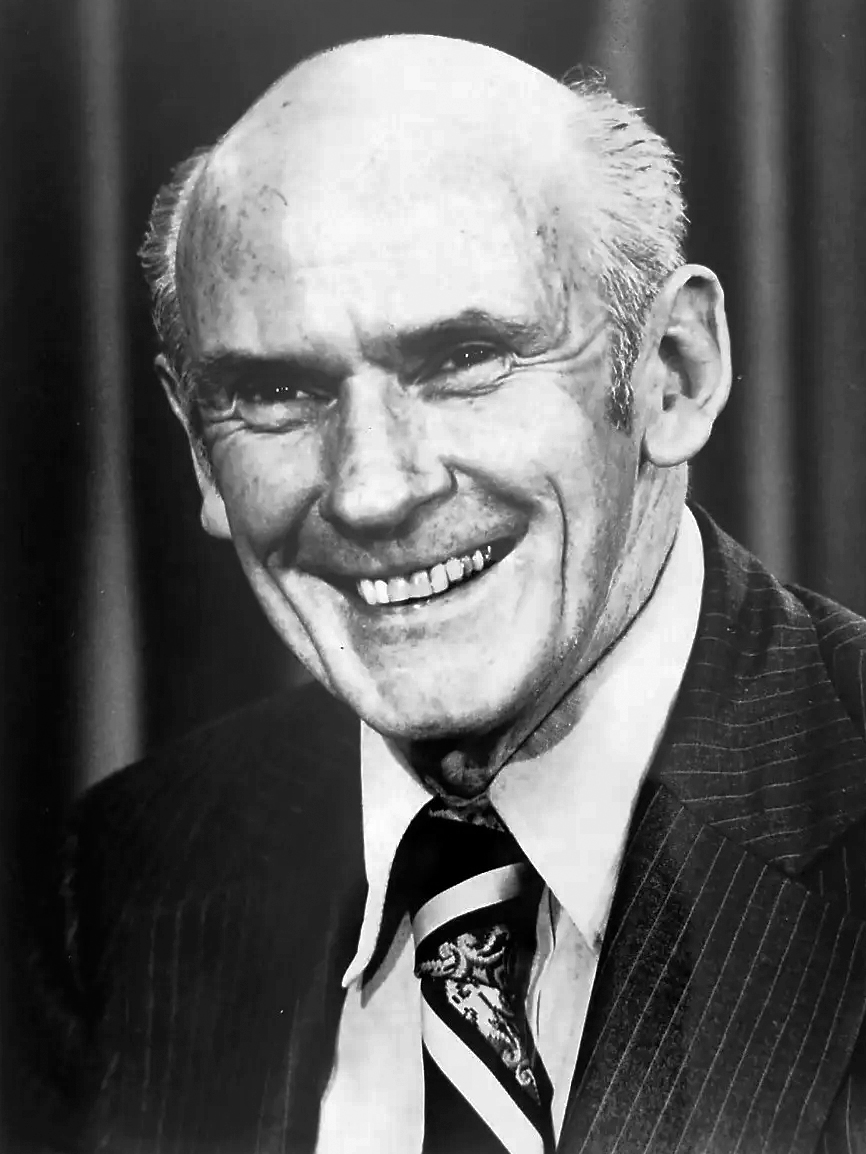
Democratic whip
Alan Cranston

=== House of Representatives ===
==== Alabama ====
▌1. Sonny Callahan (R)
▌2. William Louis Dickinson (R)
▌3. Bill Nichols (D)
▌4. Tom Bevill (D)
▌5. Ronnie Flippo (D)
▌6. Ben Erdreich (D)
▌7. Richard Shelby (D)

==== Alaska ====
▌At-large. Don Young (R)

==== Arizona ====
▌1. John McCain (R)
▌2. Mo Udall (D)
▌3. Bob Stump (R)
▌4. Eldon Rudd (R)
▌5. Jim Kolbe (R)

==== Arkansas ====
▌1. William Vollie Alexander Jr. (D)
▌2. Tommy F. Robinson (D)
▌3. John Paul Hammerschmidt (R)
▌4. Beryl Anthony Jr. (D)

==== California ====
▌1. Douglas H. Bosco (D)
▌2. Eugene A. Chappie (R)
▌3. Bob Matsui (D)
▌4. Vic Fazio (D)
▌5. Sala Burton (D)
▌6. Barbara Boxer (D)
▌7. George Miller (D)
▌8. Ron Dellums (D)
▌9. Pete Stark (D)
▌10. Don Edwards (D)
▌11. Tom Lantos (D)
▌12. Ed Zschau (R)
▌13. Norman Mineta (D)
▌14. Norman D. Shumway (R)
▌15. Tony Coelho (D)
▌16. Leon Panetta (D)
▌17. Chip Pashayan (R)
▌18. Richard H. Lehman (D)
▌19. Robert J. Lagomarsino (R)
▌20. Bill Thomas (R)
▌21. Bobbi Fiedler (R)
▌22. Carlos Moorhead (R)
▌23. Anthony Beilenson (D)
▌24. Henry Waxman (D)
▌25. Edward R. Roybal (D)
▌26. Howard Berman (D)
▌27. Mel Levine (D)
▌28. Julian Dixon (D)
▌29. Augustus Hawkins (D)
▌30. Matthew G. Martínez (D)
▌31. Mervyn Dymally (D)
▌32. Glenn M. Anderson (D)
▌33. David Dreier (R)
▌34. Esteban Edward Torres (D)
▌35. Jerry Lewis (R)
▌36. George Brown Jr. (D)
▌37. Al McCandless (R)
▌38. Bob Dornan (R)
▌39. William E. Dannemeyer (R)
▌40. Robert Badham (R)
▌41. Bill Lowery (R)
▌42. Dan Lungren (R)
▌43. Ron Packard (R)
▌44. Jim Bates (D)
▌45. Duncan L. Hunter (R)

==== Colorado ====
▌1. Pat Schroeder (D)
▌2. Tim Wirth (D)
▌3. Michael L. Strang (R)
▌4. Hank Brown (R)
▌5. Ken Kramer (R)
▌6. Dan Schaefer (R)

==== Connecticut ====
▌1. Barbara B. Kennelly (D)
▌2. Sam Gejdenson (D)
▌3. Bruce Morrison (D)
▌4. Stewart McKinney (R)
▌5. John G. Rowland (R)
▌6. Nancy Johnson (R)

==== Delaware ====
▌At-large. Tom Carper (D)

==== Florida ====
▌1. Earl Hutto (D)
▌2. Don Fuqua (D)
▌3. Charles E. Bennett (D)
▌4. Bill Chappell (D)
▌5. Bill McCollum (R)
▌6. Buddy MacKay (D)
▌7. Sam Gibbons (D)
▌8. Bill Young (R)
▌9. Michael Bilirakis (R)
▌10. Andy Ireland (R)
▌11. Bill Nelson (D)
▌12. Tom Lewis (R)
▌13. Connie Mack III (R)
▌14. Dan Mica (D)
▌15. Clay Shaw (R)
▌16. Lawrence J. Smith (D)
▌17. William Lehman (D)
▌18. Claude Pepper (D)
▌19. Dante Fascell (D)

==== Georgia ====
▌1. Lindsay Thomas (D)
▌2. Charles Floyd Hatcher (D)
▌3. Richard Ray (D)
▌4. Pat Swindall (R)
▌5. Wyche Fowler (D)
▌6. Newt Gingrich (R)
▌7. George Darden (D)
▌8. J. Roy Rowland (D)
▌9. Ed Jenkins (D)
▌10. Doug Barnard Jr. (D)

==== Hawaii ====
▌1. Cecil Heftel (D), until July 11, 1986

▌1. Neil Abercrombie (D), from September 20, 1986

▌2. Daniel Akaka (D)

==== Idaho ====
▌1. Larry Craig (R)
▌2. Richard H. Stallings (D)

==== Illinois ====
▌1. Charles Hayes (D)
▌2. Gus Savage (D)
▌3. Marty Russo (D)
▌4. George M. O'Brien (R), until July 17, 1986
▌5. Bill Lipinski (D)
▌6. Henry Hyde (R)
▌7. Cardiss Collins (D)
▌8. Dan Rostenkowski (D)
▌9. Sidney R. Yates (D)
▌10. John Porter (R)
▌11. Frank Annunzio (D)
▌12. Phil Crane (R)
▌13. Harris Fawell (R)
▌14. John E. Grotberg (R), until November 15, 1986
▌15. Edward Rell Madigan (R)
▌16. Lynn Morley Martin (R)
▌17. Lane Evans (D)
▌18. Robert H. Michel (R)
▌19. Terry L. Bruce (D)
▌20. Dick Durbin (D)
▌21. Melvin Price (D)
▌22. Kenneth J. Gray (D)

==== Indiana ====
▌1. Pete Visclosky (D)
▌2. Philip Sharp (D)
▌3. John P. Hiler (R)
▌4. Dan Coats (R)
▌5. Elwood Hillis (R)
▌6. Dan Burton (R)
▌7. John T. Myers (R)
▌8. Frank McCloskey (D), from May 1, 1985
▌9. Lee H. Hamilton (D)
▌10. Andrew Jacobs Jr. (D)

==== Iowa ====
▌1. Jim Leach (R)
▌2. Tom Tauke (R)
▌3. T. Cooper Evans (R)
▌4. Neal Edward Smith (D)
▌5. Jim Ross Lightfoot (R)
▌6. Berkley Bedell (D)

==== Kansas ====
▌1. Pat Roberts (R)
▌2. Jim Slattery (D)
▌3. Jan Meyers (R)
▌4. Dan Glickman (D)
▌5. Bob Whittaker (R)

==== Kentucky ====
▌1. Carroll Hubbard (D)
▌2. William Natcher (D)
▌3. Romano Mazzoli (D)
▌4. Gene Snyder (R)
▌5. Hal Rogers (R)
▌6. Larry J. Hopkins (R)
▌7. Chris Perkins (D)

==== Louisiana ====
▌1. Bob Livingston (R)
▌2. Lindy Boggs (D)
▌3. Billy Tauzin (D)
▌4. Buddy Roemer (D)
▌5. Jerry Huckaby (D)
▌6. Henson Moore (R)
▌7. John Breaux (D)
▌8. Gillis William Long (D), until January 20, 1985

▌Catherine Small Long (D), from March 30, 1985

==== Maine ====
▌1. John R. McKernan Jr. (R)
▌2. Olympia Snowe (R)

==== Maryland ====
▌1. Roy Dyson (D)
▌2. Helen Delich Bentley (R)
▌3. Barbara Mikulski (D)
▌4. Marjorie Holt (R)
▌5. Steny Hoyer (D)
▌6. Beverly Byron (D)
▌7. Parren Mitchell (D)
▌8. Michael D. Barnes (D)

==== Massachusetts ====
▌1. Silvio O. Conte (R)
▌2. Edward Boland (D)
▌3. Joseph D. Early (D)
▌4. Barney Frank (D)
▌5. Chester G. Atkins (D)
▌6. Nicholas Mavroules (D)
▌7. Ed Markey (D)
▌8. Tip O'Neill (D)
▌9. Joe Moakley (D)
▌10. Gerry Studds (D)
▌11. Brian J. Donnelly (D)

==== Michigan ====
▌1. John Conyers (D)
▌2. Carl Pursell (R)
▌3. Howard Wolpe (D)
▌4. Mark D. Siljander (R)
▌5. Paul B. Henry (R)
▌6. Milton Robert Carr (D)
▌7. Dale Kildee (D)
▌8. J. Bob Traxler (D)
▌9. Guy Vander Jagt (R)
▌10. Bill Schuette (R)
▌11. Robert William Davis (R)
▌12. David Bonior (D)
▌13. George Crockett Jr. (D)
▌14. Dennis Hertel (D)
▌15. William D. Ford (D)
▌16. John D. Dingell Jr. (D)
▌17. Sander Levin (D)
▌18. William Broomfield (R)

==== Minnesota ====
▌1. Tim Penny (DFL)
▌2. Vin Weber (I-R)
▌3. Bill Frenzel (I-R)
▌4. Bruce Vento (DFL)
▌5. Martin Olav Sabo (DFL)
▌6. Gerry Sikorski (DFL)
▌7. Arlan Stangeland (I-R)
▌8. Jim Oberstar (DFL)

==== Mississippi ====
▌1. Jamie Whitten (D)
▌2. Webb Franklin (R)
▌3. Sonny Montgomery (D)
▌4. Wayne Dowdy (D)
▌5. Trent Lott (R)

==== Missouri ====
▌1. Bill Clay (D)
▌2. Robert A. Young (D)
▌3. Dick Gephardt (D)
▌4. Ike Skelton (D)
▌5. Alan Wheat (D)
▌6. Tom Coleman (R)
▌7. Gene Taylor (R)
▌8. Bill Emerson (R)
▌9. Harold Volkmer (D)

==== Montana ====
▌1. Pat Williams (D)
▌2. Ron Marlenee (R)

==== Nebraska ====
▌1. Doug Bereuter (R)
▌2. Hal Daub (R)
▌3. Virginia D. Smith (R)

==== Nevada ====
▌1. Harry Reid (D)
▌2. Barbara Vucanovich (R)

==== New Hampshire ====
▌1. Bob Smith (R)
▌2. Judd Gregg (R)

==== New Jersey ====
▌1. James Florio (D)
▌2. William J. Hughes (D)
▌3. James J. Howard (D)
▌4. Chris Smith (R)
▌5. Marge Roukema (R)
▌6. Bernard J. Dwyer (D)
▌7. Matthew John Rinaldo (R)
▌8. Robert A. Roe (D)
▌9. Robert Torricelli (D)
▌10. Peter W. Rodino (D)
▌11. Dean Gallo (R)
▌12. Jim Courter (R)
▌13. Jim Saxton (R)
▌14. Frank Joseph Guarini (D)

==== New Mexico ====
▌1. Manuel Lujan Jr. (R)
▌2. Joe Skeen (R)
▌3. Bill Richardson (D)

==== New York ====
▌▌1. William Carney (C; changed to R on October 7, 1985)
▌2. Thomas Downey (D)
▌3. Robert J. Mrazek (D)
▌4. Norman F. Lent (R)
▌5. Raymond J. McGrath (R)
▌6. Joseph P. Addabbo (D), until April 10, 1986

▌Alton Waldon (D), from June 10, 1986

▌7. Gary Ackerman (D)
▌8. James H. Scheuer (D)
▌9. Thomas J. Manton (D)
▌10. Chuck Schumer (D)
▌11. Edolphus Towns (D)
▌12. Major Owens (D)
▌13. Stephen Solarz (D)
▌14. Guy Molinari (R)
▌15. Bill Green (R)
▌16. Charles Rangel (D)
▌17. Ted Weiss (D)
▌18. Robert Garcia (D)
▌19. Mario Biaggi (D)
▌20. Joe DioGuardi (R)
▌21. Hamilton Fish IV (R)
▌22. Benjamin Gilman (R)
▌23. Samuel S. Stratton (D)
▌24. Gerald Solomon (R)
▌25. Sherwood Boehlert (R)
▌26. David O'Brien Martin (R)
▌27. George C. Wortley (R)
▌28. Matthew F. McHugh (D)
▌29. Frank Horton (R)
▌30. Fred J. Eckert (R)
▌31. Jack Kemp (R)
▌32. John LaFalce (D)
▌33. Henry J. Nowak (D)
▌34. Stan Lundine (D), until December 31, 1986

==== North Carolina ====
▌1. Walter B. Jones Sr. (D)
▌2. Tim Valentine (D)
▌3. Charles Orville Whitley (D), until December 31, 1986
▌4. Bill Cobey (R)
▌5. Stephen L. Neal (D)
▌6. Howard Coble (R)
▌7. Charlie Rose (D)
▌8. Bill Hefner (D)
▌9. Alex McMillan (R)
▌10. Jim Broyhill (R), until July 14, 1986

▌Cass Ballenger (R), from November 4, 1986

▌11. Bill Hendon (R)

==== North Dakota ====
▌At-large. Byron Dorgan (D-NPL)

==== Ohio ====
▌1. Tom Luken (D)
▌2. Bill Gradison (R)
▌3. Tony P. Hall (D)
▌4. Mike Oxley (R)
▌5. Del Latta (R)
▌6. Bob McEwen (R)
▌7. Mike DeWine (R)
▌8. Tom Kindness (R)
▌9. Marcy Kaptur (D)
▌10. Clarence E. Miller (R)
▌11. Dennis E. Eckart (D)
▌12. John Kasich (R)
▌13. Don Pease (D)
▌14. John F. Seiberling (D)
▌15. Chalmers Wylie (R)
▌16. Ralph Regula (R)
▌17. Jim Traficant (D)
▌18. Douglas Applegate (D)
▌19. Ed Feighan (D)
▌20. Mary Rose Oakar (D)
▌21. Louis Stokes (D)

==== Oklahoma ====
▌1. James R. Jones (D)
▌2. Mike Synar (D)
▌3. Wes Watkins (D)
▌4. Dave McCurdy (D)
▌5. Mickey Edwards (R)
▌6. Glenn English (D)

==== Oregon ====
▌1. Les AuCoin (D)
▌2. Bob Smith (R)
▌3. Ron Wyden (D)
▌4. Jim Weaver (D)
▌5. Denny Smith (R)

==== Pennsylvania ====
▌1. Thomas M. Foglietta (D)
▌2. William H. Gray III (D)
▌3. Robert A. Borski Jr. (D)
▌4. Joseph P. Kolter (D)
▌5. Richard T. Schulze (R)
▌6. Gus Yatron (D)
▌7. Robert W. Edgar (D)
▌8. Peter H. Kostmayer (D)
▌9. Bud Shuster (R)
▌10. Joseph M. McDade (R)
▌11. Paul Kanjorski (D)
▌12. John Murtha (D)
▌13. Lawrence Coughlin (R)
▌14. William J. Coyne (D)
▌15. Donald L. Ritter (R)
▌16. Bob Walker (R)
▌17. George Gekas (R)
▌18. Doug Walgren (D)
▌19. Bill Goodling (R)
▌20. Joseph M. Gaydos (D)
▌21. Tom Ridge (R)
▌22. Austin Murphy (D)
▌23. William Clinger (R)

==== Rhode Island ====
▌1. Fernand St. Germain (D)
▌2. Claudine Schneider (R)

==== South Carolina ====
▌1. Thomas F. Hartnett (R)
▌2. Floyd Spence (R)
▌3. Butler Derrick (D)
▌4. Carroll A. Campbell Jr. (R)
▌5. John Spratt (D)
▌6. Robin Tallon (D)

==== South Dakota ====
▌At-large. Tom Daschle (D)

==== Tennessee ====
▌1. Jimmy Quillen (R)
▌2. John Duncan Sr. (R)
▌3. Marilyn Lloyd (D)
▌4. Jim Cooper (D)
▌5. Bill Boner (D)
▌6. Bart Gordon (D)
▌7. Don Sundquist (R)
▌8. Ed Jones (D)
▌9. Harold Ford Sr. (D)

==== Texas ====
▌1. Sam B. Hall Jr. (D), until May 27, 1985

▌Jim Chapman (D), from August 3, 1985

▌2. Charlie Wilson (D)
▌3. Steve Bartlett (R)
▌4. Ralph Hall (D)
▌5. John Bryant (D)
▌6. Joe Barton (R)
▌7. Bill Archer (R)
▌8. Jack Fields (R)
▌9. Jack Brooks (D)
▌10. J. J. Pickle (D)
▌11. Marvin Leath (D)
▌12. Jim Wright (D)
▌13. Beau Boulter (R)
▌14. Mac Sweeney (R)
▌15. Kika de la Garza (D)
▌16. Ron Coleman (D)
▌17. Charles Stenholm (D)
▌18. Mickey Leland (D)
▌19. Larry Combest (R)
▌20. Henry B. González (D)
▌21. Tom Loeffler (R)
▌22. Tom DeLay (R)
▌23. Albert Bustamante (D)
▌24. Martin Frost (D)
▌25. Michael A. Andrews (D)
▌26. Dick Armey (R)
▌27. Solomon P. Ortiz (D)

==== Utah ====
▌1. Jim Hansen (R)
▌2. David Smith Monson (R)
▌3. Howard C. Nielson (R)

==== Vermont ====
▌At-large. Jim Jeffords (R)

==== Virginia ====
▌1. Herbert H. Bateman (R)
▌2. G. William Whitehurst (R)
▌3. Thomas J. Bliley Jr. (R)
▌4. Norman Sisisky (D)
▌5. Dan Daniel (D)
▌6. Jim Olin (D)
▌7. D. French Slaughter Jr. (R)
▌8. Stanford Parris (R)
▌9. Rick Boucher (D)
▌10. Frank Wolf (R)

==== Washington ====
▌1. John Miller (R)
▌2. Al Swift (D)
▌3. Don Bonker (D)
▌4. Sid Morrison (R)
▌5. Tom Foley (D)
▌6. Norm Dicks (D)
▌7. Mike Lowry (D)
▌8. Rod Chandler (R)

==== West Virginia ====
▌1. Alan Mollohan (D)
▌2. Harley O. Staggers Jr. (D)
▌3. Bob Wise (D)
▌4. Nick Rahall (D)

==== Wisconsin ====
▌1. Les Aspin (D)
▌2. Robert Kastenmeier (D)
▌3. Steve Gunderson (R)
▌4. Jerry Kleczka (D)
▌5. Jim Moody (D)
▌6. Tom Petri (R)
▌7. Dave Obey (D)
▌8. Toby Roth (R)
▌9. Jim Sensenbrenner (R)

==== Wyoming ====
▌At-large. Dick Cheney (R)

==== Non-voting members ====
▌American Samoa. Fofō Iosefa Fiti Sunia (D)
▌District of Columbia. Walter Fauntroy (D)
▌Guam. Vicente T. Blaz (R)
▌Puerto Rico. Jaime Fuster (PPD)
▌Virgin Islands. Ron de Lugo (D)

House majority leadership

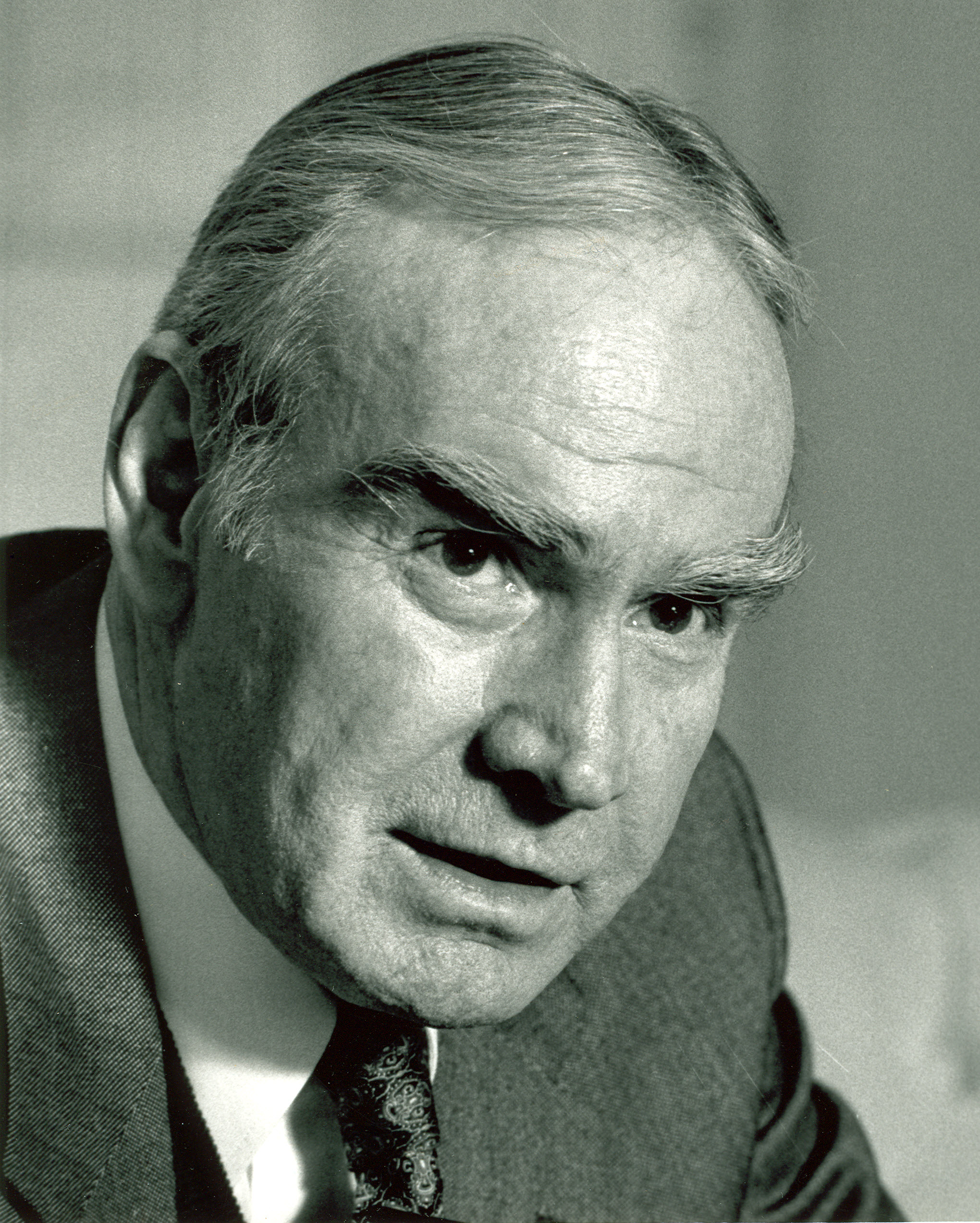
Democratic leader
Jim Wright

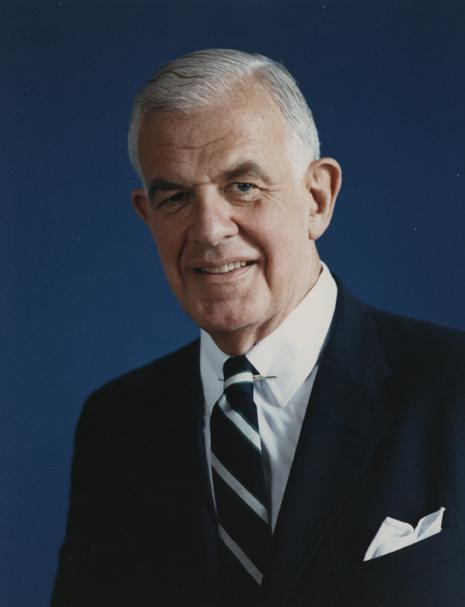
Democratic whip
Tom Foley

House minority leadership

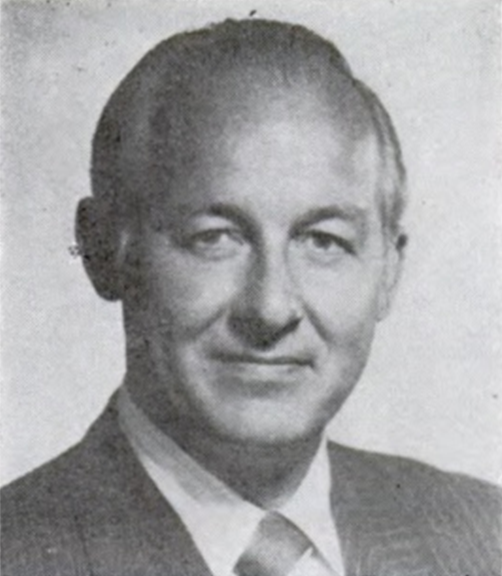
Republican leader
Robert H. Michel

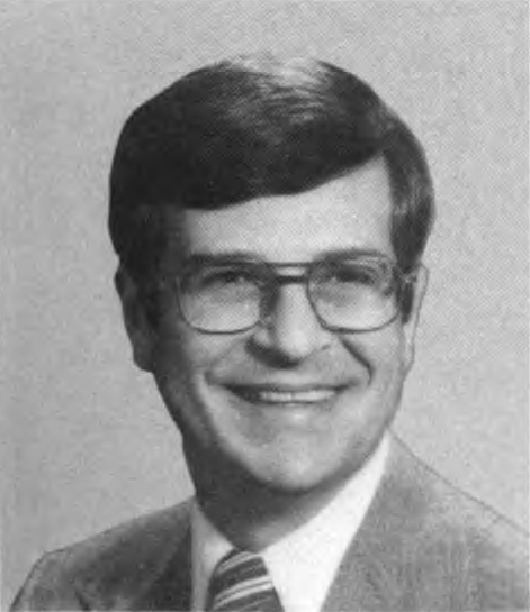
Republican whip
Trent Lott

== Changes in membership ==
=== Senate ===
Senate changes
State (class)	Vacated by	Reason for change	Successor	Date of successor's formal installation (Note: When seated or oath administered, not necessarily when service began.)
West Virginia (2)	Vacant	Senator-elect chose to wait until finishing term as Governor of West Virginia.	Jay Rockefeller (D)	January 15, 1985
North Carolina (3)	John Porter East (R)	Died June 29, 1986. Successor appointed to continue the term.	Jim Broyhill (R)	July 14, 1986
North Carolina (3)	Jim Broyhill (R)	Interim appointee lost special election. Successor elected to finish the term.	Terry Sanford (D)	November 5, 1986

=== House of Representatives ===
House changes
District	Vacated by	Reason for change	Successor	Date of successor's formal installation
Indiana's 8th	Disputed	House declared McCloskey the winner after auditors from the US General Accounting Office conducted a recount and Republican floor votes were rejected.	Frank McCloskey (D)	May 1, 1985
Louisiana's 8th	Gillis William Long (D)	Died January 20, 1985.	Catherine Small Long (D)	March 30, 1985
Texas's 1st	Sam B. Hall Jr. (D)	Resigned May 27, 1985, to become judge for the US District Court for the Eastern District of Texas.	Jim Chapman (D)	August 3, 1985
New York's 1st	William Carney (C)	Changed parties October 7, 1985.	William Carney (R)	October 7, 1985
New York's 6th	Joseph P. Addabbo (D)	Died April 10, 1986.	Alton Waldon (D)	June 10, 1986
Hawaii's 1st	Cecil Heftel (D)	Resigned July 11, 1986.	Neil Abercrombie (D)	September 20, 1986
North Carolina's 10th	Jim Broyhill (R)	Resigned July 14, 1986, to become U.S. Senator.	Cass Ballenger (R)	November 4, 1986
Illinois's 4th	George M. O'Brien (R)	Died July 17, 1986.	Vacant	Not filled this term
Illinois's 14th	John E. Grotberg (R)	Died November 15, 1986.	Vacant	Not filled this term
New York's 34th	Stan Lundine (D)	Resigned December 31, 1986.	Vacant	Not filled this term
North Carolina's 3rd	Charles Orville Whitley (D)	Resigned December 31, 1986.	Vacant	Not filled this term

== Committees ==
Lists of committees and their party leaders for members of the House and Senate committees can be found through the Official Congressional Directory at the bottom of this article. The directory after the pages of terms of service lists committees of the Senate, House (Standing with Subcommittees, Select and Special) and Joint and, after that, House/Senate committee assignments. On the committees section of the House and Senate in the Official Congressional Directory, the committee's members on the first row on the left side shows the chairman of the committee and on the right side shows the ranking member of the committee.

=== Senate ===
- Aging (Special) (Chair: H. John Heinz III)
- Agriculture, Nutrition and Forestry (Chair: Jesse Helms; Ranking Member: Edward Zorinsky)
- Appropriations (Chair: Mark Hatfield; Ranking Member: John C. Stennis)
  - Agriculture and Related Agencies (Chair: Thad Cochran; Ranking Member: Quentin N. Burdick)
  - Commerce, Justice, State and Judiciary (Chair: Paul Laxalt; Ranking Member: Ernest F. Hollings)
  - Defense (Chair: Ted Stevens; Ranking Member: John C. Stennis)
  - District of Columbia (Chair: Arlen Specter; Ranking Member: Frank Lautenberg)
  - Energy and Water Development (Chair: Ted Stevens; Ranking Member: J. Bennett Johnston)
  - Foreign Operations (Chair: Bob Kasten; Ranking Member: Daniel K. Inouye)
  - HUD-Independent Agencies (Chair: Jake Garn; Ranking Member: Patrick Leahy)
  - Interior (Chair: James A. McClure; Ranking Member: Robert C. Byrd)
  - Labor-Health, Education and Welfare (Chair: Lowell P. Weicker; Ranking Member: William Proxmire)
  - Legislative Branch (Chair: Al D'Amato; Ranking Member: Dale Bumpers)
  - Military Construction (Chair: Mack Mattingly; Ranking Member: Jim Sasser)
  - Transportation (Chair: Mark Andrews; Ranking Member: Lawton Chiles)
  - Treasury, Postal Service and General Government (Chair: James Abdnor; Ranking Member: Dennis DeConcini)
- Armed Services (Chair: Barry Goldwater; Ranking Member: Sam Nunn)
  - Military Construction (Chair: Strom Thurmond; Ranking Member: Jeff Bingaman)
  - Strategic and Theater Nuclear Forces (Chair: John W. Warner; Ranking Member: John W. Warner)
  - Preparedness (Chair: Gordon J. Humphrey; Ranking Member: Alan J. Dixon)
  - Sea Power and Force Projection (Chair: William S. Cohen; Ranking Member: J. James Exon)
  - Manpower and Personnel (Chair: Pete Wilson; Ranking Member: John Glenn)
  - Defense Acquisition Policy (Chair: Dan Quayle; Ranking Member: Carl Levin)
- Banking, Housing and Urban Affairs (Chair: Jake Garn; Ranking Member: William Proxmire)
  - Housing and Urban Affairs (Chair: Chic Hecht; Ranking Member: Donald W. Riegle Jr.)
  - International Finance and Monetary Policy (Chair: H. John Heinz III; Ranking Member: William Proxmire)
  - Financial Institutions and Consumer Affairs (Chair: Slade Gorton; Ranking Member: Paul Sarbanes)
  - Securities (Chair: Al D'Amato; Ranking Member: Alan Cranston)
  - Economic Policy (Chair: Mack Mattingly; Ranking Member: Chris Dodd)
- Budget (Chair: Pete Domenici; Ranking Member: Lawton Chiles)
- Commerce, Science and Transportation (Chair: John Danforth; Ranking Member: Ernest F. Hollings)
  - Aviation (Chair: Nancy Kassebaum; Ranking Member: J. James Exon)
  - Business, Trade and Tourism (Chair: Larry Pressler; Ranking Member: Al Gore)
  - Communications (Chair: Barry Goldwater; Ranking Member: Ernest F. Hollings)
  - Consumer (Chair: Bob Kasten; Ranking Member: Wendell Ford)
  - Merchant Marine (Chair: Ted Stevens; Ranking Member: Daniel K. Inouye)
  - Science, Technology and Space (Chair: Slade Gorton; Ranking Member: Donald W. Riegle Jr.)
  - Surface Transportation (Chair: Bob Packwood; Ranking Member: Russell B. Long)
  - National Ocean Policy Study (Chair: John Danforth; Ranking Member: Ernest F. Hollings)
- Energy and Natural Resources (Chair: James A. McClure; Ranking Member: J. Bennett Johnston)
  - Energy Regulation and Conservation (Chair: Don Nickles; Ranking Member: Howard M. Metzenbaum)
  - Natural Resources Development and Production (Chair: John Warner; Ranking Member: John Melcher)
  - Energy Research and Development (Chair: Pete Domenici; Ranking Member: Bill Bradley)
  - Water and Power (Chair: Frank Murkowski; Ranking Member: Dale Bumpers)
  - Public Lands, Reserved Water and Resource Conservation (Chair: Malcolm Wallop; Ranking Member: Dale Bumpers)
- Environment and Public Works (Chair: Robert Stafford; Ranking Member: Lloyd Bentsen)
  - Environmental Pollution (Chair: John Chafee; Ranking Member: George J. Mitchell)
  - Nuclear Regulation (Chair: Alan K. Simpson; Ranking Member: Gary Hart)
  - Water Resources (Chair: James Abdnor; Ranking Member: Daniel Moynihan)
  - Transportation (Chair: Steve Symms; Ranking Member: Quentin N. Burdick)
  - Regional and Community Development (Chair: Gordon J. Humphrey; Ranking Member: Frank R. Lautenberg)
  - Toxic Substances and Environmental Oversight (Chair: David Durenberger; Ranking Member: Max Baucus)
- Ethics (Select) (Chair: Warren Rudman; Vice Chair: Howell Heflin)
- Finance (Chair: Bob Packwood; Ranking Member: Russell B. Long)
  - Taxation and Debt Management (Chair: John H. Chafee; Ranking Member: Spark Matsunaga)
  - International Trade (Chair: John C. Danforth; Ranking Member: Lloyd Bentsen)
  - Savings, Pensions and Investment Policy (Chair: H. John Heinz III; Ranking Member: George J. Mitchell)
  - Energy and Agricultural Taxation (Chair: Malcolm Wallop; Ranking Member: Bill Bradley)
  - Health (Chair: David Durenberger; Ranking Member: Max Baucus)
  - Social Security and Income Maintenance Programs (Chair: William L. Armstrong; Ranking Member: Daniel Moynihan)
  - Estate and Gift Taxation (Chair: Steve Symms; Ranking Member: Bill Bradley)
  - Oversight of the Internal Revenue Service (Chair: Bob Dole; Ranking Member: David Pryor)
- Foreign Relations (Chair: Richard Lugar; Ranking Member: Claiborne Pell)
  - Western Hemisphere Affairs (Chair: Jesse Helms; Ranking Member: Edward Zorinsky)
  - International Economic Policy, Oceans and Environment (Chair: Charles Mathias; Ranking Member: Chris Dodd)
  - African Affairs (Chair: Nancy Kassebaum; Ranking Member: John Kerry)
  - Near Eastern and South Asian Affairs (Chair: Rudy Boschwitz; Ranking Member: Paul Sarbanes)
  - European Affairs (Chair: Larry Pressler; Ranking Member: Joe Biden)
  - East Asian and Pacific Affairs (Chair: Frank Murkowski; Ranking Member: Alan Cranston)
- Governmental Affairs (Chair: Bill Roth; Ranking Member: Thomas F. Eagleton)
  - Permanent Subcommittee on Investigations (Chair: Bill Roth; Ranking Member: Sam Nunn)
  - Governmental Efficiency and the District of Columbia (Chair: Charles Mathias; Ranking Member: Thomas F. Eagleton)
  - Energy, Nuclear Proliferation and Federal Services (Chair: Thad Cochran; Ranking Member: John Glenn)
  - Intergovernmental Relations (Chair: David Durenberger; Ranking Member: Lawton Chiles)
  - Civil Service, Post Office and General Services (Chair: Ted Stevens; Ranking Member: Al Gore)
  - Oversight of Government Management (Chair: William S. Cohen; Ranking Member: Carl Levin)
- Impeachment of Harry E. Claiborne (Select) (Chair: Charles Mathias; Ranking Member: )
- Indian Affairs (Select) (Chair: Mark Andrews)
- Judiciary (Chair: Strom Thurmond; Ranking Member: Joe Biden)
  - Patents, Copyrights and Trademarks (Chair: Charles Mathias; Ranking Member: Patrick Leahy)
  - Criminal Law (Chair: Paul Laxalt; Ranking Member: Joe Biden)
  - Constitution (Chair: Orrin Hatch; Ranking Member: Dennis DeConcini)
  - Immigration and Refugee Policy (Chair: Alan K. Simpson; Ranking Member: Ted Kennedy)
  - Courts (Chair: John P. East; Ranking Member: Howell Heflin)
  - Administration Practice and Procedure (Chair: Chuck Grassley; Ranking Member: Howard M. Metzenbaum)
  - Security and Terrorism (Chair: Jeremiah Denton; Ranking Member: Patrick Leahy)
  - Juvenile Justice (Chair: Arlen Specter; Ranking Member: Paul Simon)
- Intelligence (Select) (Chair: David Durenberger; Vice Chairman: Patrick Leahy)
- Labor and Human Resources (Chair: Orrin Hatch; Ranking Member: Ted Kennedy)
  - Labor (Chair: Don Nickles; Ranking Member: Howard M. Metzenbaum)
  - Education, Arts and Humanities (Chair: Robert Stafford; Ranking Member: Claiborne Pell)
  - Employment and Productivity (Chair: Dan Quayle; Ranking Member: Paul Simon)
  - Handicapped (Chair: Lowell P. Weicker; Ranking Member: John Kerry)
  - Children, Family, Drugs and Alcoholism (Chair: Paula Hawkins; Ranking Member: Chris Dodd)
  - Aging (Chair: Chuck Grassley; Ranking Member: Spark Matsunaga)
- Nutrition and Human Needs (Select) (Chair: [data missing])
- Rules and Administration (Chair: Charles Mathias; Ranking Member: Wendell H. Ford)
- Security and Cooperation in Europe (Special) (Chair: [data missing])
- Small Business (Chair: Lowell P. Weicker Jr.; Ranking Member: Dale Bumpers)
  - Urban and Rural Economic Development (Chair: Al D'Amato; Ranking Member: Alan J. Dixon)
  - Government Procurement (Chair: Don Nickles; Ranking Member: Carl Levin)
  - Productivity and Competition (Chair: Slade Gorton; Ranking Member: Dale Bumpers)
  - Innovation and Technology (Chair: Warren Rudman; Ranking Member: David L. Boren)
  - Export Promotion and Market Development (Chair: Rudy Boschwitz; Ranking Member: Max Baucus)
  - Small Business Family Farm (Chair: Larry Pressler; Ranking Member: Sam Nunn)
  - Entrepreneurship and Special Problems Facing Small Business (Chair: Bob Kasten; Ranking Member: Jim Sasser)
- Veterans' Affairs (Chair: Frank Murkowski; Ranking Member: Alan Cranston)
- Whole

=== House of Representatives ===
- Aging (Select) (Chair: Edward Roybal)
- Agriculture (Chair: Kika de la Garza; Ranking Member: Edward Madigan)
  - Cotton, Rice and Sugar (Chair: Jerry Huckaby; Ranking Member: Arlan Stangeland)
  - Livestock, Dairy and Poultry (Chair: Tony Coelho; Ranking Member: Jim Jeffords)
  - Tobacco and Peanuts (Chair: Charlie Rose; Ranking Member: Larry J. Hopkins)
  - Wheat, Soybeans and Feed Grains (Chair: Tom Foley; Ranking Member: Ron Marlenee)
  - Conservation Credit and Rural Development (Chair: Ed Jones; Ranking Member: E. Thomas Coleman)
  - Department Operations Research and Foreign Agriculture (Chair: Berkley Bedell; Ranking Member: Pat Roberts)
  - Domestic Marketing, Consumer Relations and Nutrition (Chair: Leon Panetta; Ranking Member: Bill Emerson)
  - Forests, Family Farms and Energy (Chair: Charles Whitley)
- Appropriations (Chair: Jamie L. Whitten; Ranking Member: Silvio O. Conte)
  - Agriculture, Rural Development and Related Agencies (Chair: Jamie Whitten; Ranking Member: Silvio O. Conte)
  - Commerce, Justice, State and the Judiciary (Chair: Neal Edward Smith; Ranking Member: Virginia Smith)
  - Defense (Chair: Joseph P. Addabbo; Ranking Member: George M. O'Brien)
  - District of Columbia (Chair: Julian C. Dixon; Ranking Member: Joseph M. McDade)
  - Energy and Water Development (Chair: Tom Bevill; Ranking Member: Lawrence Coughlin)
  - Foreign Operations (Chair: David Obey; Ranking Member: John T. Myers)
  - HUD-Independent Agencies (Chair: Edward P. Boland; Ranking Member: Bill Green)
  - Interior (Chair: Sidney Yates; Ranking Member: Ralph Regula)
  - Labor-Health and Human Services (Chair: William H. Natcher; Ranking Member: Silvio O. Conte)
  - Legislative (Chair: Victor Fazio; Ranking Member: Jerry Lewis)
  - Military Construction (Chair: Bill Hefner; Ranking Member: Mickey Edwards)
  - Transportation (Chair: William Lehman; Ranking Member: Lawrence Coughlin)
  - Treasury, Postal Service and General Government (Chair: Edward Roybal; Ranking Member: Joe Skeen)
- Armed Services (Chair: Les Aspin; Ranking Member: William L. Dickinson)
  - Military Personnel and Compensation (Chair: Edward Roybal; Ranking Member: Elwood Hillis)
  - Research and Development (Chair: Charles Melvin Price; Ranking Member: William L. Dickinson)
  - Seapower, Strategic and Critical Materials (Chair: Charles Edward Bennett; Ranking Member: Floyd Spence)
  - Procurement and Military Nuclear Systems (Chair: Samuel S. Stratton; Ranking Member: Marjorie S. Holt)
  - Investigations (Chair: Bill Nichols; Ranking Member: Larry J. Hopkins)
  - Readiness (Chair: Dan Daniel; Ranking Member: G. William Whitehurst)
  - Morale, Welfare and Recreation (MWR) Panel (Chair: Dan Daniel; Ranking Member: G. William Whitehurst)
  - Military Installations and Facilities (Chair: Ron Dellums; Ranking Member: Ken Kramer)
- Banking, Finance and Urban Affairs (Chair: Fernand St. Germain; Ranking Member: Chalmers P. Wylie)
  - Financial Institutions Supervision, Regulation and Insurance (Chair: Fernand St. Germain; Ranking Member: Chalmers P. Wylie)
  - Housing and Community Development (Chair: Henry B. Gonzalez; Ranking Member: Stewart B. McKinney)
  - Consumer Affairs and Coinage (Chair: Frank Annunzio; Ranking Member: John P. Hiler)
  - Domestic Monetary Policy (Chair: Walter E. Fauntroy; Ranking Member: Bill McCollum)
  - International Finance, Trade and Monetary Policy (Chair: Stephen L. Neal; Ranking Member: Jim Leach)
  - General Oversight and Renegotiation (Chair: Carroll Hubbard; Ranking Member: Stanford Parris)
  - Economic Stabilization (Chair: John J. LaFalce; Ranking Member: Norman D. Shumway)
  - International Development Institutions and Finance (Chair: Stan Lundine; Ranking Member: Doug Bereuter)
- Budget (Chair: William H. Gray; Ranking Member: Del Latta)
  - Defense and International Affairs (Chair: Thomas J. Downey; Ranking Member: Bobbi Fiedler)
  - Economic Policy (Chair: Mike Lowry; Ranking Member: Jack Kemp)
  - Budget Process (Chair: Butler Derrick; Ranking Member: Lynn Morley Martin)
  - State and Local Government (Chair: George Miller; Ranking Member: Connie Mack III)
  - Human Resources (Chair: Pat Williams; Ranking Member: Bill Goodling)
  - Community and Natural Resources (Chair: Howard Wolpe; Ranking Member: Tom Loeffler)
  - Health (Chair: Martin Frost; Ranking Member: Willis D. Gradison Jr.)
  - Income Security (Chair: Victor H. Fazio; Ranking Member: W. Henson Moore)
- Children, Youth and Families (Select) (Chair: George Miller)
- District of Columbia (Chair: Ron Dellums; Ranking Member: Stewart B. McKinney)
  - Fiscal Affairs and Health (Chair: Walter E. Fauntroy; Ranking Member: Stewart McKinney)
  - Government Operations and Metropolitan Affairs (Chair: Michael D. Barnes; Ranking Member: Stanford Parris)
  - Judiciary and Education (Chair: Mervyn M. Dymally; Ranking Member: Thomas J. Bliley Jr.)
- Education and Labor (Chair: Augustus F. Hawkins; Ranking Member: Jim Jeffords)
  - Elementary, Secondary and Vocational Education (Chair: Augustus F. Hawkins; Ranking Member: William F. Goodling)
  - Postsecondary Education (Chair: William D. Ford; Ranking Member: E. Thomas Coleman)
  - Health and Safety (Chair: Joseph M. Gaydos; Ranking Member: Rod Chandler)
  - Labor-Management Relations (Chair: Bill Clay; Ranking Member: Tom Petri)
  - Labor Standards (Chair: Austin J. Murphy; Ranking Member: Tom Petri)
  - Human Resources (Chair: Dale E. Kildee; Ranking Member: Tom Tauke)
  - Select Education (Chair: Pat Williams; Ranking Member: Steve Bartlett)
  - Employment Opportunities (Chair: Matthew G. Martinez; Ranking Member: Steve Gunderson)
- Energy and Commerce (Chair: John Dingell; Ranking Member: Jim Broyhill)
  - Oversight and Investigations (Chair: John Dingell; Ranking Member: Jim Broyhill)
  - Health and the Environment (Chair: Henry Waxman; Ranking Member: Edward Madigan)
  - Telecommunications, Consumer Protection and Finance (Chair: Timothy Wirth; Ranking Member: Matthew J. Rinaldo)
  - Fossil and Synthetic Fuels (Chair: Phil Sharp; Ranking Member: William E. Dannemeyer)
  - Commerce, Transportation and Tourism (Chair: James J. Florio; Ranking Member: Norman F. Lent)
  - Energy Conservation and Power (Chair: Ed Markey; Ranking Member: Carlos J. Moorhead)
- Foreign Affairs (Chair: Dante Fascell; Ranking Member: William S. Broomfield)
  - Arms Control, International Security and Science (Chair: Dante Fascell; Ranking Member: William S. Broomfield)
  - Europe and the Middle East (Chair: Lee H. Hamilton; Ranking Member: Benjamin A. Gilman)
  - Human Rights and International Organizations (Chair: Gus Yatron; Ranking Member: Gerald B.H. Solomon)
  - International Economic Policy and Trade (Chair: Stephen J. Solarz; Ranking Member: Toby Roth)
  - Asian and Pacific Affairs (Chair: Don Bonker; Ranking Member: Jim Leach)
  - International Operations (Chair: Dan Mica; Ranking Member: Olympia Snowe)
  - Western Hemisphere Affairs (Chair: Michael D. Barnes; Ranking Member: Robert J. Lagomarsino)
  - Africa (Chair: Howard Wolpe; Ranking Member: Mark Siljander)
- Government Operations (Chair: Jack Brooks; Ranking Member: Frank Horton)
  - Legislation and National Security (Chair: Jack Brooks; Ranking Member: Frank Horton)
  - Government Activities and Transportation (Chair: Cardiss Collins; Ranking Member: Al McCandless)
  - Government Information and Individual Rights (Chair: Glenn English; Ranking Member: Thomas N. Kindness)
  - Ingovernmental Relations and Human Resources (Chair: Ted Weiss; Ranking Member: Robert S. Walker)
  - Environment, Energy and Natural Resources (Chair: Mike Synar; Ranking Member: William F. Clinger Jr.)
  - Commerce, Consumer and Monetary Affairs (Chair: Doug Barnard; Ranking Member: Larry E. Craig)
  - Employment and Housing (Chair: Barney Frank; Ranking Member: Howard C. Nielson)
- House Administration (Chair: Frank Annunzio; Ranking Member: Bill Frenzel)
  - Accounts (Chair: Joseph Gaydos; Ranking Member: Robert E. Badham)
  - Services (Chair: Ed Jones; Ranking Member: William L. Dickinson)
  - Office Systems (Chair: Charlie Rose; Ranking Member: Bill Thomas)
  - Personnel and Police (Chair: Leon Panetta; Ranking Member: Pat Roberts)
  - Elections (Chair: Al Swift; Ranking Member: Bill Thomas)
  - Procurement and Printing (Chair: Tom Foley; Ranking Member: Newt Gingrich)
- Hunger (Select) (Chair: Mickey Leland)
- Interior and Insular Affairs (Chair: Mo Udall; Ranking Member: Don Young)
  - Energy and the Environment (Chair: Mo Udall; Ranking Member: Manuel Lujan Jr.)
  - Public Lands (Chair: John F. Seiberling; Ranking Member: Ron Marlenee)
  - General Oversight, Northwest Power and Forest Management (Chair: Jim Weaver; Ranking Member: Chip Pashayan)
  - Water and Power Resources (Chair: George Miller; Ranking Member: Dick Cheney)
  - Mining and Natural Resources (Chair: Nick Rahall; Ranking Member: Larry E. Craig)
  - National Parks and Recreation (Chair: Bruce Vento; Ranking Member: Robert J. Lagomarsino)
- Judiciary (Chair: Peter W. Rodino; Ranking Member: Hamilton Fish IV)
  - Immigration, Refugees and International Law (Chair: Romano L. Mazzoli; Ranking Member: Dan Lungren)
  - Administrative Law and Governmental Relations (Chair: Sam B. Hall Jr.; Ranking Member: Thomas N. Kindness)
  - Courts, Civil Liberties and the Administration of Justice (Chair: Robert W. Kastenmeier; Ranking Member: Carlos J. Moorhead)
  - Civil and Constitutional Rights (Chair: Don Edwards; Ranking Member: Jim Sensenbrenner)
  - Monopolies and Commercial Law (Chair: Peter W. Rodino; Ranking Member: Hamilton Fish IV)
  - Crime (Chair: William J. Hughes; Ranking Member: Bill McCollum)
  - Criminal Justice (Chair: John Conyers; Ranking Member: George W. Gekas)
- Merchant Marine and Fisheries (Chair: Walter B. Jones Sr.; Ranking Member: Norman F. Lent)
  - Merchant Marine (Chair: Mario Biaggi; Ranking Member: Gene Snyder)
  - Fisheries, Wildlife Conservation and the Environment (Chair: John Breaux; Ranking Member: Don Young)
  - Oceanography (Chair: Barbara Mikulski; Ranking Member: Norman D. Shumway)
  - Panama Canal and Outer Continental Stuff (Chair: Mike Lowry; Ranking Member: Jack Fields)
  - Coast Guard and Navigation (Chair: Gerry Studds; Ranking Member: Robert W. Davis)
  - Oversight and Investigations (Chair: Walter B. Jones Sr.; Ranking Member: William Carney)
- Narcotics Abuse and Control (Select) (Chair: Charles B. Rangel)
- Post Office and Civil Service (Chair: Jack Brooks; Ranking Member: Gene Taylor)
  - Civil Service (Chair: Patricia Schroeder; Ranking Member: Chip Pashayan)
  - Census and Population (Chair: Robert Garcia; Ranking Member: James V. Hansen)
  - Postal Operations and Services (Chair: Mickey Leland; Ranking Member: Frank Horton)
  - Compensation and Employee Benefits (Chair: Mary Rose Oakar; Ranking Member: John T. Myers)
  - Human Resources (Chair: Gary Ackerman; Ranking Member: Dan Burton)
  - Investigations (Chair: Gerry Sikorski; Ranking Member: Gene Taylor)
  - Postal Personnel and Modernization (Chair: Mervyn M. Dymally; Ranking Member: Dan Burton)
- Public Works and Transportation (Chair: James J. Howard; Ranking Member: Gene Snyder)
  - Aviation (Chair: Norman Y. Mineta; Ranking Member: John Paul Hammerschmidt)
  - Economic Development (Chair: Henry J. Nowak; Ranking Member: William F. Clinger Jr.)
  - Investigations and Oversight (Chair: Jim Oberstar; Ranking Member: Newt Gingrich)
  - Public Buildings and Grounds (Chair: Robert A. Young; Ranking Member: E. Clay Shaw Jr.)
  - Surface Transportation (Chair: Glenn M. Anderson; Ranking Member: Bud Shuster)
  - Water Resources (Chair: Robert A. Roe; Ranking Member: Arlan Stangeland)
- Rules (Chair: Claude Pepper; Ranking Member: Jimmy Quillen)
  - The Legislative Process (Chair: Butler Derrick; Ranking Member: Trent Lott)
  - Rules of the House (Chair: Joe Moakley; Ranking Member: Gene Taylor)
- Science and Technology (Chair: Don Fuqua; Ranking Member: Manuel Lujan Jr.)
  - Energy Development and Applications (Chair: Don Fuqua; Ranking Member: Jim Sensenbrenner)
  - Natural Resources, Agriculture Research and Environment (Chair: James H. Scheuer; Ranking Member: Claudine Schneider)
  - Energy Research and Production (Chair: Marilyn Lloyd; Ranking Member: Sid Morrison)
  - Science, Research and Technology (Chair: Doug Walgren; Ranking Member: Sherwood Boehlert)
  - Transportation, Aviation and Materials (Chair: Dan Glickman; Ranking Member: Tom Lewis)
  - Investigations and Oversight (Chair: Harold Volkmer; Ranking Member: Ron Packard)
  - Space Science and Applications (Chair: Bill Nelson; Ranking Member: Robert S. Walker)
- Small Business (Chair: Parren Mitchell; Ranking Member: Joseph M. McDade)
  - SBA and SBIC Authority, Minority Enterprise and General Small Business Problems (Chair: Parren Mitchell; Ranking Member: Joseph M. McDade)
  - General Oversight and the Economy (Chair: Nicholas Mavroules; Ranking Member: Silvio O. Conte)
  - Antitrust and Restraint of Trade Activities affecting Small Business (Chair: Charles Floyd Hatcher; Ranking Member: Vin Weber)
  - Energy, Environment and Safety Issues affecting Small Business (Chair: Charles W. Stenholm; Ranking Member: William S. Broomfield)
  - Tax, Access to Equity Capital and Business Opportunities (Chair: Tom Luken; Ranking Member: John P. Hiler)
  - Export Opportunities and Special Small Business Problems (Chair: Ike Skelton; Ranking Member: Andy Ireland)
- Standards of Official Conduct (Chair: Julian C. Dixon; Ranking Member: Floyd Spence)
- Veterans' Affairs (Chair: Gillespie V. Montgomery; Ranking Member: John Paul Hammerschmidt)
  - Oversight and Investigations (Chair: Sonny Montgomery; Ranking Member: Elwood Hillis)
  - Hospitals and Health Care (Chair: Bob Edgar; Ranking Member: John Paul Hammerschmidt)
  - Education, Training and Employment (Chair: Tom Daschle; Ranking Member: Bob McEwen)
  - Compensation, Pension and Insurance (Chair: Douglas Applegate; Ranking Member: Gerald B.H. Solomon)
  - Housing and Memorial Affairs (Chair: Richard Shelby; Ranking Member: Chris Smith)
- Ways and Means (Chair: Dan Rostenkowski; Ranking Member: John J. Duncan)
  - Trade (Chair: Sam Gibbons; Ranking Member: Phil Crane)
  - Oversight (Chair: J.J. Pickle; Ranking Member: Richard T. Schulze)
  - Select Revenue Measures (Chair: Charles Rangel; Ranking Member: Guy Vander Jagt)
  - Health (Chair: Pete Stark; Ranking Member: Bill Gradison)
  - Social Security (Chair: James Robert Jones; Ranking Member: Bill Archer)
  - Public Assistance and Unemployment Compensation (Chair: Harold Ford Sr.; Ranking Member: Carroll A. Campbell Jr.)
- Whole

=== Joint committees ===
- Economic (Chair: Rep. David Obey; Vice Chair: Sen. James Abdnor)
- Taxation (Chair: Rep. Dan Rostenkowski; Vice Chair: Sen. Bob Packwood)
- The Library (Chair: Rep. Frank Annunzio; Vice Chair: Sen. Charles Mathias)
- Printing (Chair: Sen. Charles Mathias; Vice Chair: Rep. Frank Annunzio)

== Employees ==
=== Legislative branch agency directors ===
- Architect of the Capitol: George Malcolm White
- Attending Physician of the United States Congress: Freeman H. Cary, until 1986
  - William Narva, from 1986
- Comptroller General of the United States: Charles A. Bowsher
- Director of the Congressional Budget Office: Rudolph G. Penner
- Librarian of Congress: Daniel J. Boorstin
- Public Printer of the United States: Ralph E. Kennickell Jr.

=== Senate ===
- Chaplain: Richard C. Halverson (Presbyterian)
- Curator: James R. Ketchum
- Historian: Richard A. Baker
- Parliamentarian: Bob Dove
- Secretary: Jo-Anne L. Coe
- Librarian: Roger K. Haley
- Secretary for the Majority: Howard O. Greene Jr.
- Secretary for the Minority: David Pratt
- Sergeant at Arms: Larry E. Smith, until June 3, 1985
  - Ernest E. Garcia, from June 3, 1985

=== House of Representatives ===
- Chaplain: James D. Ford (Lutheran)
- Clerk: Benjamin J. Guthrie
- Doorkeeper: James T. Molloy
- Historian: Ray Smock
- Reading Clerks: Meg Goetz (D) and Bob Berry (R)
- Parliamentarian: William H. Brown
- Postmaster: Robert V. Rota
- Sergeant at Arms: Jack Russ

== See also ==
- List of new members of the 99th United States Congress
- 1984 United States elections (elections leading to this Congress)
  - 1984 United States presidential election
  - 1984 United States Senate elections
  - 1984 United States House of Representatives elections
- 1986 United States elections (elections during this Congress, leading to the next Congress)
  - 1986 United States Senate elections
  - 1986 United States House of Representatives elections
- Related articles on a diagram
