= John Grotberg =

American politician

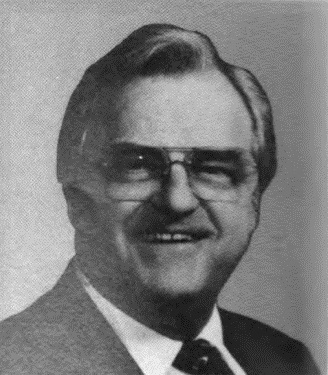

Member of the U.S. House of Representatives from Illinois's 14th district
- In office January 3, 1985 – November 15, 1986
- Preceded by: Tom Corcoran
- Succeeded by: Dennis Hastert

Member of the Illinois Senate
- In office 1977–1985

Member of the Illinois House of Representatives
- In office 1973–1977

Personal details
- Born: March 21, 1925 Winnebago, Minnesota, U.S.
- Died: November 15, 1986 (aged 61) St. Charles, Illinois, U.S.
- Party: Republican
- Education: University of Chicago; George Williams College

John E. Grotberg (March 21, 1925 – November 15, 1986) was a Republican member of the United States House of Representatives from Illinois serving from 1985 until his death from bronchial pneumonia and colon cancer in St. Charles, Illinois in 1986.

== Early life and career ==
Grotberg, the fourth of eight children of Bernard and Sophie (née Weir) Grotberg, was born in Winnebago, Minnesota, and grew up in Valley City, North Dakota. His early career was in music as a singer with The Muny (the Municipal Opera Association) in St. Louis, and he also performed in Chicago. For many years he managed the Men's Shop at the YMCA Hotel in Chicago, expanding into public relations work for the hotel, and eventually becoming corporate Director of Financial Development for the YMCA of Metropolitan Chicago.

During this time he also completed his college education at George Williams College, graduating with a B.S. in 1961. He worked for the newly opened Pheasant Run Lodge and Resort as well as performed in their lounge with his wife, Jean. He then was owner and President of John E. Grotberg and Associates, Financial Development Consultants, and General Manager of the Hotel Baker, a retirement home run by the Lutheran Social Services of Illinois.

A resident of St. Charles, Illinois, from 1955, and active in many civic and social organizations, Grotberg was an enthusiastic supporter of the fine arts, having been engaged in many musical and theatrical enterprises himself. Among Grotberg's civic accomplishments were the founding of the Tri-City Youth Project for Geneva, Batavia, and St. Charles (now TriCity Family Services), providing needed companionship and entertainment for area youths, and the Fox Valley Volunteer Hospice.

== Illinois General Assembly ==
He left his job to enter politics in 1973. From 1973 to 1977, Grotberg served two terms in the Illinois House of Representatives. In 1976, Grotberg defeated Democrat James M. Thomas, the Mayor of Ottawa, in the general election. He served in the Senate from 1977 to 1985, the last four years of which he was the Assistant Republican Leader.

== Congress ==
As a ranking Republican in the Illinois legislature, he won election to Congress in November, 1984 for an open seat in a heavily Republican district, and was a member of the Banking, Finance, and Urban Affairs and Small Business Committees.

Two bills which carried his mark were an amendment to the Defense Department authorization urging the armed forces to "use domestic equipment when entertaining in federal buildings" (prompted by an observation of a Yamaha piano being used by the Navy Choir at the Capitol) and Public Law 99-202, the Save for the USA Year, which resulted in "the largest number of savings bonds sales in the United States in several decades."

Congresswoman Marcy Kaptur (D-OH) recounted how she, as a "sophomore", and Grotberg, as a "freshman", walked right into Senator Strom Thurmond's office unannounced and asked for his help to get the Savings Bond bill taken up by the Senate. He complied on the spot; the next day Senator Robert Dole scheduled it for the floor; and on December 16, 1985, 4 days after the House passed the bill, the Senate had too, and President Ronald Reagan signed it into law.

During much of his political career, Grotberg successfully battled cancer, including experimental treatments at the National Institutes of Health that later became standard therapies throughout the US and the world. As a pioneer patient, Grotberg gave to the future and died at home surrounded by his wife and five children on November 15, 1986.

Mr. Grotberg was incapacitated in January 1986 from his experimental treatment and was unable to function. He was kept alive through the March primary so the GOP county chairs of the district could select the next nominee. 26 year old WLKB DeKalb, Ill radio program director Mark Powell learned of the plan from State Rep. John Countryman (R-DeKalb). Countryman wanted Powell to run for DeKalb County Clerk against Democratic incumbent Terry Desmond if Powell would keep this information secret.

Powell ultimately ran as a GOP congressional write-in candidate against the incapacitated congressman broadcasting radio advertising throughout the district as a protest against not allowing the rank and file voters to choose the GOP congressional nominee.

Grotberg stepped down as the Republican candidate after the 1986 primary election due to his health issues. Republican leaders in the 14th district chose then-State Representative Dennis Hastert to take his place. Hastert defeated Democratic candidate Mary Lou Kearns, the Kane County Coroner by an unusually narrow margin in the typically Republican district.

== Death and legacy ==
Following a funeral at Baker Memorial Methodist Church in St. Charles (where he had been a longtime member and regular soloist), he was buried in Union Cemetery with full military honors. The inscription on his monument reads, "Husband, Father, Statesman, Friend - He was here!" Fellow Illinois Republican Congressman George M. O'Brien too died of cancer just four months earlier.

The Fox Valley Volunteer Hospice named the John Grotberg Legacy Society to honor his dedication to the needs and dignity of the ill and infirm. On August 18, 1987 the US Post Office Building in St. Charles, IL was named the John E. Grotberg Post Office Building. The Fox Valley Chapter of VietNow named its center in Batavia the John E. Grotberg Community Veterans Center.

== Family ==
He was married to Edith Henderson Grotberg from 1947 to 1962, and to Elizabeth Jean Shierling Grotberg from 1963 until his death. He was the father of five children.

== See also ==
- List of members of the United States Congress who died in office (1950–1999)

Illinois House of Representatives
| Preceded by George R. Hudson; Goudyloch E. Dyer; J. Glenn Schneider | Member of the Illinois House of Representatives from the 38th district 1973–1977; Served alongside: Joseph Fennessey, Carl T. Hunsicker, Tom Ewing | Succeeded by Betty J. Hoxsey; Peg McDonnell Breslin |
Illinois Senate
| Preceded by William C. Harris | Member of the Illinois Senate from the 38th district 1977–1983 | Succeeded by Patrick "Pat" Welch |
| Preceded by LeRoy Lemke | Member of the Illinois Senate from the 25th district 1983–1985 | Succeeded by Doris Karpiel |
U.S. House of Representatives
| Preceded by Tom Corcoran | Member of the U.S. House of Representatives from Illinois's 14th congressional district January 3, 1985–November 15, 1986 | Succeeded by Dennis Hastert |
