= Jack Davis (Illinois politician) =

American politician (1935-2018)

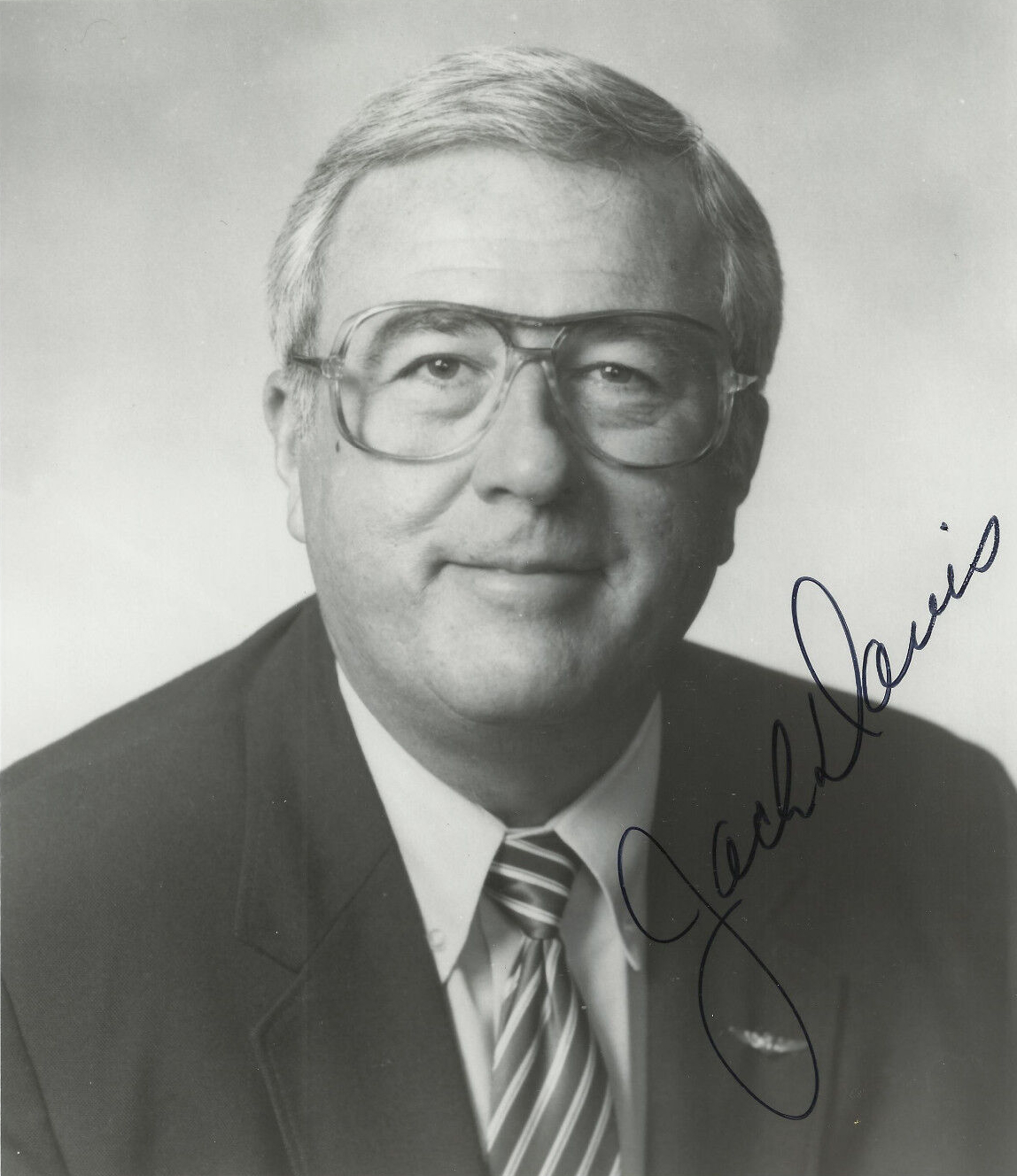

Member of the U.S. House of Representatives from Illinois's 4th district
- In office January 3, 1987 – January 3, 1989
- Preceded by: George M. O'Brien
- Succeeded by: George Sangmeister

Member of the Illinois House of Representatives
- In office 1977-1987
- Preceded by: George Sangmeister
- Succeeded by: Larry Wennlund

Personal details
- Born: Jack Bender; September 6, 1935 Chicago, Illinois, U.S.
- Died: February 4, 2018 (aged 82) Springfield, Illinois, U.S.
- Party: Republican
- Spouse: Virginia "Ginny" Davis
- Education: Southern Illinois University
- Profession: businessman

Military service
- Allegiance: United States
- Branch/service: United States Navy
- Years of service: 1956–1959
- Rank: Lieutenant

Jack Davis (September 6, 1935 – February 4, 2018) was a Republican member of the Illinois House of Representatives from 1976 to 1986, and a member of the U.S. House of Representatives from 1987 to 1989 representing Illinois's 4th congressional district.

== Early life and career ==
Davis was born in Chicago, Illinois, on September 6, 1935, to Edna (née Haflei) and Russell Bender. His biological father died when he was a child and his mother got remarried to Melcher "M.C." Davis, who adopted Jack. He graduated valedictorian from Woodlawn High School in 1952. He then attended Southern Illinois University Carbondale where he earned a Bachelor of Science in education in 1956. After graduation, he joined the United States Navy. He served as a flying officer, reaching the rank of Lieutenant (junior grade). He was released from active duty in 1959. He did graduate work in psychology while working for the State of Illinois as the assistant director of a job training center in Decatur, Illinois.

After one year, he left that position to enter the steel industry, eventually becoming the part-owner of Lexington Steel Corp, a steel processing warehouse he founded in 1969. He sold his stake in Lexington Steel in 1975 to focus on his political career. Davis moved to Crete, Illinois after entering the steel industry. He became involved with the Will County Republican Party as a precinct committeeman and served one term as a village trustee from 1969-1973. He married Virginia "Ginny" Griffin of Shelbyville, Illinois, with whom he had three children.

== State legislature ==
In 1976, State Representative George Sangmeister ran for the Illinois Senate creating an open seat in the 42nd district in the Illinois House of Representatives.In that year's general election, Davis was elected to the Illinois House of Representatives as one of three representatives from the 42nd district alongside two incumbents; fellow Republican Harry Leinenweber and Democrat LeRoy Van Duyne. The 42nd district included most of Will County. Davis was an opponent of the Equal Rights Amendment. Davis served in the Illinois House of Representatives from 1977 to 1987. After the 1982 general election, Davis ran for House Minority Leader, ultimately losing to Lee A. Daniels. At the start of the 83rd Illinois General Assembly, Daniels named Davis an assistant minority leader. After he was nominated to run for Congress, the vacancy for the Republican nomination in the 84th district was filled by Larry Wennlund, who would go on to win the general election.

While in the state legislature, Davis continued his involvement in Republican Party affairs and was a delegate pledged to the 1980 Ronald Reagan Presidential campaign and in 1984 became the chairman the Will County Republican Party.

== U.S. Congress ==
On May 16, 1986, incumbent Republican Congressman George M. O'Brien withdrew as the Republican nominee in the 1986 election. The various precinct and township committeeman in Illinois's 4th congressional district, a group which included Davis, nominated Davis to the vacancy. In the general election, Davis faced 28-year-old attorney/CPA and Democratic nominee Shawn Collins. Davis defeated Collins by a surprisingly narrow margin with 61,583 votes to Collins' 57,773 votes. Collins was able to win their shared home county of Will and also win Kane, while Davis won the portions of the district in Cook and Kendall counties.

He served one term, 1987 to 1989. Davis voted against the Abandoned Shipwrecks Act of 1987. The Act asserts United States title to certain abandoned shipwrecks located on or embedded in submerged lands under state jurisdiction, and transfers title to the respective state, thereby empowering states to manage these cultural and historical resources more efficiently, with the goal of preventing treasure hunters and salvagers from damaging them. President Ronald Reagan signed it into law on April 28, 1988.

He was an unsuccessful candidate for reelection in 1988, losing to the Democratic candidate, George E. Sangmeister.

== After Congress ==
Davis served as Assistant Secretary of the Air Force for Manpower, Readiness and Resources from 1990 to 1992; he was awarded the Meritorious Service Medal for activities in northern Iraq during Operations Desert Shield and Desert Storm. In the early to mid 2000s, Davis hosted a radio show, Davis and Company, on 970 WMAY in Springfield, Illinois. Davis died on February 4, 2018, at his home in Springfield, Illinois, from complications of dementia.

U.S. House of Representatives
Preceded by George M. O'Brien	U.S. Representative of Illinois' 4th congressional district 1987-1989	Succeeded by George Sangmeister
