= WJRC =

WJRC may refer to:

- WJRC (FM), a radio station (90.9 FM) licensed to serve Lewistown, Pennsylvania, United States
- WWHN, a radio station (1510 AM) licensed to serve Joliet, Illinois, United States, which held the call sign WJRC from 1955 to 1987
- West Japan Railway Company(WJRC) Japanese Railway Corporation.
