= Timothy L. Schmitz =

American politician

Tim Schmitz

Member of the Illinois House of Representatives
- In office January 13, 1999 – January 2, 2015
- Preceded by: Suzanne Deuchler
- Succeeded by: Steven Andersson
- Constituency: 42nd district (1999-2003); 49th district (2003-2013); 65th district (2013-2015)

Personal details
- Born: September 26, 1965 (age 61) Geneva, Illinois
- Party: Republican
- Spouse: Julianne
- Children: Two
- Education: Augustana College
- Profession: Real estate developer Firefighter

Timothy L. Schmitz was a Republican member of the Illinois House of Representatives, representing the 49th district from 1999 to 2015. He was a Deputy Republican Leader.

== Early life and career ==
Schmitz was born September 26, 1965, in Geneva, Illinois. He earned a Bachelor of Arts in political science and public administration from Augustana College. From 1989 to 1992, he worked as a policy staffer for House Minority Leader Lee Daniels. At some point, he entered real estate development becoming the owner of ARS Land Group. Schmitz began serving as a paid on-call firefighter in 1984 with the Batavia Fire Department. He and his wife Julianne have two sons. Schmitz was elected to the Batavia City Council in 1995 where he would serve a single term.

== Illinois House of Representatives ==
In 1997, nine-term Republican incumbent Suzanne Deuchler announced her retirement from the Illinois House of Representatives. Schmitz decided to run to succeed her as the state representative from the 42nd district. The 42nd district stretched from Montgomery in the south to St. Charles in the north and included all or parts of Batavia, Geneva, and Aurora, Illinois. In what local media noted was a competitive race, Schmitz won the Republican primary against Patrick Jaeger, the Geneva Township Supervisor, Jim Pilmer, a trustee for Waubonsee Community College, and novice candidate Ravi Singh. Schmitz ran as an anti-abortion candidate. In the 1998 general election, Schmitz defeated Democratic candidate and West Aurora School Board member Juan Thomas.

After the 2001 decennial redistricting process, Schmitz's district was shifted northward with its southern end in Batavia stretching northward to include Geneva, St. Charles, South Elgin, Elgin, Hampshire, Burlington, Huntly, Algonquin, Carpentersville, Gilberts, Sleepy Hollow, and Pingree Grove and renumbered the 49th district. After the 2011 decennial redistricting process, Schmitz's district remained largely intact, losing Carpentersville and Burlington and was renumbered the 65th district.

During his time in the Illinois House, he served as a co-chair of the Joint Committee on Administrative Rules. During the 2008 Republican Party presidential primaries, Schmitz endorsed the presidential campaign of Rudy Giuliani.

On September 13, 2013, Schmitz announced that he would not run for reelection. After the 2014 general election, Schmitz resigned effective January 2, 2015. Steven Andersson, the winner of the 2014 general election, was appointed by local Republican leaders and sworn into office that same day.

== Post-legislative life ==
After his time in the Illinois House of Representatives, Schmitz took a position with the governmental affairs team at the International Code Council. As of 2021, he is a Regional Director and responsible for ICC's presence in Illinois, Wisconsin, Missouri, and Kansas.
