= Ricky Rivard =

American politician

Member-elect of the Illinois House of Representatives from the 65th district
- Assuming office January 2027
- Succeeding: Dan Ugaste

Personal details
- Party: Democratic

Ricky Rivard is an American politician. A member of the Democratic Party, he is the member-elect for the 65th district of the Illinois House of Representatives.
