= Jack McGuire =

American politician (1933–2020)

Member of the Illinois House of Representatives from the 86th district
- In office 1990–2012
- Preceded by: LeRoy Van Duyne
- Succeeded by: Lawrence M. Walsh Jr.

Personal details
- Born: May 12, 1933 Joliet, Illinois, U.S.
- Died: January 2, 2020 (aged 86) Illinois, U.S.
- Party: Democratic
- Spouse: Marilyn (Miller) McGuire
- Profession: Educator, Politician

John C. McGuire (May 12, 1933 – January 2, 2020) was an American politician.

McGuire served as a Democratic member of the Illinois House of Representatives, representing the 86th District from 1990 until his resignation in April 2012. McGuire was born in Joliet, Illinois and graduated from Joliet Catholic High School in 1951. He served in the United States Army during the Korean War and was stationed in Germany. McGuire went to Joliet Junior College and graduated from Colorado State College in 1958.
