= Dan Ugaste =

American politician

- Ugaste speaking in 2026

Member of the Illinois House of Representatives from the 65th district
- Incumbent
- Assumed office January 9, 2019
- Preceded by: Steven Andersson
- Succeeded by: Ricky Rivard (elect)

Personal details
- Born: Daniel Jon Ugaste; November 15, 1963 (age 63)
- Party: Republican
- Spouse: Denise Danos
- Children: 3
- Education: Lake Forest College (BA); DePaul University (JD)

Daniel Jon Ugaste is a lawyer, politician and Republican member of the Illinois House of Representatives who has represented the 65th district since 2019. He has served as Assistant Minority Leader in the House since 2025. The district, located in the western Chicago metropolitan area, includes all or parts of Campton Hills, Elburn, Elgin, Geneva, Lily Lake, South Elgin, St. Charles, and Wayne.

== Education and law career ==
Ugaste earned a Bachelor of Arts at Lake Forest College and a juris doctor at DePaul University College of Law.

In the 1990s, Ugaste was an attorney for Seyfarth Shaw, Limited Liability Partnership and Wiedner & McAuliffe, Limited Company.

Ugaste is a shareholder in the Nyhan, Bambrick, Kinzie and Lowry Law Firm and specializes in workers' compensation. He worked as a member of the Illinois Workers' Compensation Medical Fee Advisory Board and as a technical advisor to Bruce Rauner's Office on Workers' Compensation Reform.

== Illinois House of Representatives ==
In 2014, Ugaste ran for the Illinois House of Representatives. He was defeated in the Republican primary by Steven Andersson.

In 2018, Anderson retired from the legislature. Ugaste was elected to the Illinois House of Representatives, defeating Democratic candidate Richard Johnson, the President of the Elgin Teachers Union.

In 2020, Ugaste was re-elected, defeating activist Martha Paschke.

Ugaste won a third term in 2022, defeating scientist and small business owner Linda Robertson. Ugaste won a fourth term in 2024, when he faced off against Robertson a second time.

In the 104th General Assembly, Ugaste became Assistant Minority Leader in the House of Representatives.

=== Committees ===
In the 103rd General Assembly, Ugaste served on the following committees: Financial Institutions & Licensing (Republican Spokesperson); Judiciary - Civil (Republican Spokesperson); Labor & Commerce (Republican Spokesperson); Police & Fire Committee; Prescription Drug Affordability; Public Utilities; Civil Procedure & Tort Liability (Sub-Co-Chairperson); Commercial & Property (Sub-Co-Chairperson); Business & Industry Innovation.

== Political positions ==
Ugaste supports term limits of “no shorter than 12 years” for members of the General Assembly.

== Personal life ==
Ugaste lives in Geneva and is married. He has three adult daughters and six grandchildren.

== Electoral history ==
Illinois 65th Representative District General Election, 2024
| Party | Candidate | Votes | % | ±% |
|---|---|---|---|---|
| Republican | Dan Ugaste (incumbent) | 32,890 | 55.8 | 1.5 |
| Democratic | Linda R. Robertson | 26,011 | 44.2 | −1.5 |
| Total votes | | 58,901 | 100.0 | |

Illinois 65th Representative District General Election, 2022
| Party | Candidate | Votes | % | ±% |
|---|---|---|---|---|
| Republican | Dan Ugaste (incumbent) | 23,867 | 54.3 | +2.47 |
| Democratic | Linda R. Robertson | 20,098 | 45.7 | −2.47 |
| Total votes | | 43,965 | 100.0 | |

Illinois 65th Representative District General Election, 2020
| Party | Candidate | Votes | % | ±% |
|---|---|---|---|---|
| Republican | Dan Ugaste (incumbent) | 35,206 | 51.83 | −0.31% |
| Democratic | Martha Paschke | 32,720 | 48.17 | +0.31% |
| Total votes | | 67,926 | 100.0 | |

Illinois 65th Representative District General Election, 2018
| Party | Candidate | Votes | % |
|---|---|---|---|
| Republican | Dan Ugaste | 26,475 | 52.14 |
| Democratic | Richard Johnson | 24,306 | 47.86 |
| Total votes | | 50,781 | 100.0 |
