= Steven Andersson =

American politician (born 1964)

- Andersson in 2016

Member of the Illinois House of Representatives from the 65th district
- In office January 1, 2015 – January 9, 2019
- Preceded by: Timothy L. Schmitz
- Succeeded by: Dan Ugaste

Personal details
- Born: August 15, 1964 (age 62)
- Party: Republican
- Education: Northern Illinois University (B.S.); Northern Illinois University (J.D.)
- Profession: Attorney at Law

Steven A. Andersson (born August 15, 1964) is a former Republican member of the Illinois House of Representatives representing the 65th district. The 65th district is located in northwestern Kane County.

Andersson earned his bachelor's degree from in 1986 and his Juris Doctor degree in 1992, both from Northern Illinois University. He is a small business owner and is a partner in the law firms of Mickey, Wilson, Weiler, Renzi & Andersson, P.C. and the Elder law Center, P.C. He served as a trustee on the Geneva Public Library Board.

Elected in the 2014 general election, he took office two weeks earlier than the majority of the 2015 freshman class when his predecessor Timothy L. Schmitz chose to resign early. On August 16, 2017, Andersson announced he would not seek reelection to the Illinois House of Representatives in 2018 during an appearance on Chicago Tonight. He was succeeded by fellow Republican Dan Ugaste. In 2018, J. B. Pritzker appointed Andersson to Powering Illinois’ Future transition committee, which is responsible for infrastructure and clean energy policies.

In June 2019, Governor J. B. Pritzker appointed Andersson to the Illinois Human Rights Commission. His appointment depends on confirmation from the Illinois Senate.
