= KWHN-FM =

Radio station in Haynesville, Louisiana (1984–1999)

- United States
- Broadcast area: Haynesville, Louisiana
- Frequency: 105.5 MHz

Programming
- Format: Urban contemporary

Ownership
- Owner: Hawkins Broadcasting Company

History
- First air date: September 1984
- Last air date: 1998
- Call sign meaning: From sister station WWHN

Technical information
- Facility ID: 26464
- Class: A
- ERP: 2,900 watts
- HAAT: 144 m (472 ft)
- Transmitter coordinates: 33°3′13″N 93°10′27″W

KWHN-FM was a radio station at 105.5 FM in Haynesville, Louisiana, with transmitter located in Columbia County, Arkansas. The station broadcast between 1984 and 1998.

== History ==
On November 3, 1981, J.P. Robillard and his Ladybug Broadcasting Company, owners of KLUV (1580 AM), were granted a construction permit to build a sister FM station in Haynesville. The station signed on the air as KLVU-FM in 1984, after the stations engaged in a call letter swap with Dallas radio station KLVU, which became KLUV. The station offered an easy listening format when it launched that September.

In 1990, KLVU-AM-FM was sold for $200,000 to the Hawkins Broadcasting Company, headed by Ray Hawkins. Hawkins owned WWHN in the Chicago area, and the proceeds from the operation of WWHN subsidized the acquisition of the stations in Shreveport. Hawkins returned the FM station to air as urban contemporary KWHN-FM in 1991, giving KMJJ-FM its first competition in the format, though the station was a rimshot with a poor signal in Shreveport proper.

The station had its Federal Communications Commission license deleted in 1998 for failure to renew.
