= WWHN =

Radio station in Joliet–Irondale–Chicago, Illinois

Coordinates: 41°30′50″N 88°03′10″W

- Joliet, Illinois; United States
- Broadcast area: Will County, South Side, Chicago
- Frequency: 1510 kHz
- Branding: Comfortable Radio

Programming
- Format: Urban adult contemporary

Ownership
- Owner: Hawkins Broadcasting Company

History
- First air date: April 10, 1964
- Former call signs: WJRC (1964–1987)

Technical information
- Licensing authority: FCC
- Facility ID: 26465
- Class: D
- Power: 1,000 watts (Daytime); 600 watts (critical hours)
- Translator: 101.5 W268CY (Tinley Park)
- Repeater: See § Repeater

Links
- Public license information: Public file; LMS
- Webcast: Listen live
- Website: www.wwhn.net

WWHN is a radio station licensed in Joliet, Illinois, serving the Chicago metropolitan area with an urban adult contemporary format. It operates on AM frequency 1510 kHz and is under ownership of Hawkins Broadcasting Company. Because it shares the same frequency as "clear channel" station WLAC in Nashville, Tennessee, WWHN operates during daytime hours only.

== History ==
=== WJRC ===
The station first began broadcasting on April 10, 1964, as WJRC. Its call sign stood for "Joliet Radio Corporation", the station's owner at the time. The station ran 500 watts, during daytime hours only.

WJRC aired an easy listening format in the early 1970s. Later in the decade and into the 1980s, the station aired a full service format, programming a variety of music along with news and talk programming. William G. Barr hosted a twice-weekly radio program on WJRC from November 11, 1986, until his death in February 1987.

=== WWHN ===
The station's callsign was changed to WWHN on September 14, 1987. The station briefly aired an all-news format, before adopting an oldies format with the slogan "Remember When". In 1989, WWHN was purchased by Hawkins Broadcasting Corporation for $250,000.

In 1990, the station's power was increased to 1,000 watts. In 1991, the station's format was changed from urban oldies to black gospel. In 1992, the station was simulcast on 102.3 WTAS in Crete, Illinois, as well as 105.5 KWHN-FM and 1580 KLVU in Haynesville, Louisiana.
