= John J. Houlihan =

American politician and businessman

Member of the Illinois House of Representatives

Personal details
- Party: Democratic

John Joseph Houlihan (March 25, 1923 – July 24, 2003) was an American politician and businessman.

Houlihan was born in Chicago, Illinois, and went to the Chicago parochial and public schools. He graduated from Leo Catholic High School. He was in the United States Marine Corps during World War II in the Pacific and was badly wounded; one of his legs was amputated. He went to the Englewood Evening School and DePaul University. Houlihan was involved in the insurance business and with the AFL–CIO labor movement. He lived with his wife and family in Park Forest, Illinois. Houlihan was a Democrat and served in the Illinois House of Representatives from 1965 to 1973. He was defeated twice in runs for Congress, losing his bids for the 17th Congressional District seat in 1972 and 1974 to Republican George M. O'Brien. Houlihan died of lung cancer at his home in Palos Heights, Illinois.
