= J. Glenn Schneider =

American politician

Member of the Illinois House of Representatives from the 41st district 38th district (1971-1973)
- In office January 1971 – January 1983
- Preceded by: James L. Wright
- Succeeded by: District Abolished

Personal details
- Born: September 30, 1935 Chicago, Illinois
- Died: February 13, 2017 (aged 81) Winfield, Illinois
- Party: Democratic
- Children: Two children
- Education: Northern Illinois University (B.A., M.A.)
- Profession: Teacher

Military service
- Allegiance: United States of America
- Branch/service: United States Air Force
- Years of service: 1955-1958

J. Glenn Schneider (September 30, 1935 – February 13, 2017) was an American educator and politician.

Born in Chicago, Illinois, Schneider attended J. Sterling Morton High School in Cicero, Illinois. Schneider served in the United States Air Force from 1955 to 1958. He received his bachelor's and master's degree in history and government from Northern Illinois University in 1961 and 1968 respectively. In 1962, he began teaching history and government at Naperville North High School.

Schneider was involved in the Democratic Party serving as the Chairman of the Lisle Township Democratic Organization. Schneider served in the Illinois Constitutional Convention of 1970 and on the Naperville City Council.

In 1970, he was elected to the Illinois House of Representatives succeeding Democrat James L. Wright of Westmont where he served until 1983. During his tenure, he won multiple awards from environmental organizations including the League of Conservation Voters and the United States E.P.A.

In 1975, Mayor Richard J. Daley supported Democratic leader Clyde L. Choate of Anna. Governor Dan Walker objected to Choate for personal reasons and supported Gerald A. Bradley of Bloomington. Schneider had reservations about a Choate speakership and drafted William A. Redmond to run for Speaker. No candidate, which at various points in time included up to eleven Democrats and the Republican leader James R. Washburn could get the 89 votes required to be elected Speaker. After an election that took over a week, Republican defectors including future Speaker Lee A. Daniels, voted for Redmond ending the stalemate. He was named Chair of the Elementary and Secondary Education committee by Redmond.

He died in at Central DuPage Hospital in Winfield, Illinois.
