= William G. Barr =

American businessman and politician

Member of the Illinois House of Representatives from the 41st district
- In office 1967–1971

Personal details
- Born: January 18, 1920 Joliet, Illinois, U.S.
- Died: February 25, 1987 (aged 67) Joliet, Illinois, U.S.
- Education: University of Illinois; University of Wisconsin

Military service
- Allegiance: United States
- Branch/service: United States Air Force

William G. Barr (January 18, 1920 – February 25, 1987) was an American businessman and politician.

Barr was born in Joliet, Illinois. His father Richard J. Barr was a lawyer and served in the Illinois Senate. Barr attended Joliet public schools and later the University of Illinois and the University of Wisconsin. He served in the United States Army Air Forces during World War II.

Barr then worked as a rent control examiner for the United States Government in Kankakee, Illinois. In 1953, Barr served as the director of the Office of Rent Stabilization in Washington, D.C. Starting in 1954, Barr was a building contractor in Joliet, Illinois, where he built homes and apartment buildings. He also started ACF Properties in Fort Lauderdale, Florida with D. J. Antonelli, Jr. involving real estate and management.

In Joliet, Barr served in the Illinois House of Representatives from 1967 to 1971. He was a Republican and then switched to the Democratic Party. In 1970, Barr ran for mayor of Joliet, Illinois and lost the election. During the 1970 Joliet mayoral election, he was seriously injured in a car bombing and lost his right leg. Barr established the Institute for the Advancement of Prosthetics in Lansing, Michigan. He hosted a twice-weekly radio program on 1510 WJRC from November 11, 1986, until his death in February 1987. He died at his home in Joliet, Illinois.
