= George Sangmeister =

American politician (1931–2007)

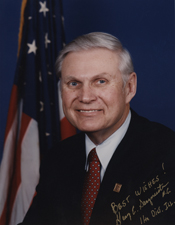

Member of the U.S. House of Representatives from Illinois
- In office January 3, 1989 – January 3, 1995
- Preceded by: Jack Davis
- Succeeded by: Jerry Weller
- Constituency: 4th District (1989–1993); 11th District (1993–1995)

Member of the Illinois Senate
- In office 1977–1987
- Preceded by: James F. Bell
- Succeeded by: Thomas A. Dunn

Member of the Illinois House of Representatives
- In office 1973–1977

Personal details
- Born: George Edward Sangmeister; February 16, 1931 Frankfort, Illinois, U.S.
- Died: October 7, 2007 (aged 76) Joliet, Illinois, U.S.
- Resting place: Abraham Lincoln Cemetery
- Party: Democratic
- Education: John Marshall Law School; Elmhurst College
- Occupation: Lawyer

George Edward Sangmeister (February 16, 1931 – October 7, 2007) was an American politician who served as a U.S. representative from Illinois. He originally represented Illinois' 4th congressional district, before it was renumbered as the 11th district.

== Early life ==
Sangmeister was born in Frankfort, Illinois. Sangmeister married Doris Hinspeter. He attended Joliet Junior College before entering the military and serving as a sergeant in the United States Army during the Korean War. After returning to private life, he attended Elmhurst College and then earned a law degree from the John Marshall Law School in Chicago. Sangmeister spent several years in private law practice before becoming a magistrate for Will County, Illinois, in 1961. In 1964, he was elected Will County State's Attorney, the county's chief prosecutor and lawyer.

== Illinois state politics ==
In 1972, Sangmeister was elected as a Democrat to the Illinois House of Representatives. In the 1976 general election, Sangmeister defeated Republican incumbent James F. Bell to be elected to a four-year term serving as the 42nd district's state senator in the Illinois Senate. Sangmeister became a powerful Democratic leader in the state Senate.

In the 1986 Illinois gubernatorial election, Sangmeister ran for the Democratic nomination for lieutenant governor and was endorsed by presumptive Democratic nominee Adlai Stevenson III to be his running mate. However, Sangmeister lost to Mark Fairchild, a LaRouchite entryist, in the Democratic primary. Sangmeister opted against joining Stevenson on the newly formed Solidarity Party. Stevenson chose former Cook County judge and son of Michael Howlett Michael J. Howlett Jr. to serve as his new running mate. The incumbent Republicans James R. Thompson and George Ryan defeated Stevenson and Howlett in the general election.

== Congress ==
In 1988, Sangmeister was elected to Congress in a marginally Republican district. After three terms in the House, he declined to seek re-election in 1994, citing his frustration with national politics. Jerry Weller, a Republican state legislator, defeated fellow state legislator and Democratic candidate Frank Giglio in the 1994 general election to succeed Sangmeister.

== Later life and death ==
Sangmeister returned to private law practice for several years thereafter. He died of leukemia, aged 76. He was interred on October 11, 2007, at Abraham Lincoln National Cemetery in Elwood, Illinois.

U.S. House of Representatives
| Preceded by Jack Davis | Member of the U.S. House of Representatives from Illinois's 4th congressional district 1989–1993 | Succeeded by Luis Gutiérrez |
| Preceded by Frank Annunzio | Member of the U.S. House of Representatives from Illinois's 11th congressional district 1993–1995 | Succeeded by Jerry Weller |
