= Suzanne Deuchler =

American politician (1929–2022)

Suzanne L. Deuchler

Member of the Illinois House of Representatives from the 42nd district
- In office 1981–1999
- Preceded by: William Kempiners
- Succeeded by: Timothy L. Schmitz

Personal details
- Born: Suzanne Louise Clark; July 21, 1929 Chicago, Illinois, U.S.
- Died: June 24, 2022 (aged 92) Aurora, Illinois, U.S.
- Party: Republican
- Spouse: Walter Deuchler

Suzanne Louise Deuchler (née Clark; July 21, 1929 – June 24, 2022) was an American Republican politician who was a member of the Illinois House of Representatives from the 42nd district. She retired in 1999, after nine terms.

== Personal background ==
Suzanne Louise Deuchler (née Clark) was born on July 21, 1929, in Chicago and raised in Shelbyville, Illinois. She studied at the Dayton Art Institute with muralist Ruth VanSickle Ford. She had a Bachelor of Arts degree in Spanish and Speech from the University of Illinois.

=== Community involvement ===
Deuchler was the co-founder of the Illinois Math and Science Academy. She served as a member of the Fox Valley Health Services Board, Aurora Regional Advisory Committee to the Department of Children and Family Services, Aurora University Citizen's Advisory Board, Joseph Corporation of the Illinois Advisory Board, League of Women Voters, American Association of University Women, Department of Public Aid's Welfare Services Committee, and Copley Memorial Hospital Board of Directors.

== Political career ==
Deuchler's community involvement in various organizations, including the League of Women Voters and the American Association of University Women led to a career in local politics. In 1976, she was elected to the Kane County Board. Four years later, she threw her hat in the ring to represent the 42nd District of Illinois, as a Republican member of the Illinois General Assembly.

In the lead-up to the 1980 election, incumbent Republican William Kempiners of Shorewood declined to run for reelection. In the Republican primary for the two nominations, she and the other incumbent Republican, Al Schoeberlein, were nominated. During the general election, Schoeberlein fell ill and was replaced with Dennis Hastert. She, Hastert, and Democratic incumbent Lawrence Murphy were elected that year from the 39th district.

After the Cutback Amendment, Deuchler ran for the 42nd district against Democratic candidate William Glisson.

While serving in the Illinois State House of Representatives, Deuchler was named to several committees. She served as the chair and minority spokesperson of the Financial Institutions Committee and the Vice-Chair for Personnel and Pensions Committee. She was also a member of Human Services, and General Services and Government Oversight Appropriations. She served as the minority spokesperson for the State Government Administration Committee and the Vice-Spokesperson for Environment and Energy, and Reapportionment Committees. She also served as past co-chairperson of the Conference of Women Legislators, the Citizens Council on Energy Resources, the Immigration Reform Task Force, and the White House Conference on Children.

Deuchler was pro-choice and against the criminalization of abortion.

== Death ==
She died in Aurora, Illinois, on June 24, 2022, at the age of 92.

== Honors and awards ==
- Woman of the Year (1979) – YWCA
- Woman of the Year – Beta Sigma Phi
- Woman of the Year – Aurora Business and Professional Women's Club
- Friend of Agriculture Award – Illinois Farm Bureau
- Friend of Agriculture Award – Illinois Agricultural Association
- Outstanding Legislator Award – Kane County Farm Bureau
- Outstanding Legislator Award – Illinois Taxpayers Federation
- Outstanding Legislator Award – National Taxpayers
- Outstanding Legislator Award – United of Illinois
