= LeRoy Van Duyne =

American politician (1973–2003)

Member of the Illinois House of Representatives from the 83rd district
- In office January 12, 1983 – January 9, 1991
- Preceded by: District created
- Succeeded by: Jack McGuire

Member of the Illinois House of Representatives from the 42nd district
- In office January 8, 1975 – January 12, 1983
- Preceded by: District created
- Succeeded by: Suzanne Deuchler

Personal details
- Born: December 3, 1923 Manhattan, Illinois
- Died: November 26, 2003 (aged 79) Joliet, Illinois
- Political party: Democratic

LeRoy Van Duyne (December 3, 1923 – November 26, 2003) was an American politician who served in the Illinois House of Representatives from 1975 to 1991.
