= George R. Hudson =

American politician

George Raymond Hudson (July 31, 1919 – February 10, 2012) was an American businessman, politician, and artist.

Hudson was born in Weedsport, New York. He graduated from Denison University in 1942. Hudson served in the United States Army Air Corps during World War II and was commissioned a second lieutenant. In 1947, Hudson graduated from the American Academy of Art in Chicago, Illinois. He was an engraver, artist, photographer, and graphic designer, Hudson was also a cartoonist and created a cartoon strip: Travelin' Ted for the Chicago Tribune. Hudson also helped start an advertising firm. Hudson served in the Illinois House of Representatives from 1971 to 1983 and in the Illinois Senate from 1983 to 1992. Hudson was a Republican. Hudson died at a hospital in Downers Grove, Illinois.
