= James R. Washburn =

American politician (1921–2007)

Member of the Illinois House of Representatives
- In office 1967–1977

Personal details
- Born: April 25, 1921 Morris, Illinois, U.S.
- Died: August 8, 2007 (aged 86) Morris, Illinois, U.S.
- Party: Republican
- Education: North Central College
- Occupation: Politician

Military service
- Allegiance: United States
- Branch/service: United States Marine Corps
- Battles/wars: World War II

James R. Washburn (April 25, 1921 – August 8, 2007) was an American politician.

== Biography ==
Washburn was born in Morris, Illinois on April 25, 1921. During World War II he served as a pilot in the United States Marine Corps. He went to North Central College and University of Illinois. In 1946, Washburn became the youngest countywide official in the county's history when he was elected the County Treasurer for Grundy County, Illinois. After his term as County Treasurer, he held positions with the Office of the Illinois State Superintendent, the Office of the Illinois State Treasurer, and the Office of the Governor of Illinois. Washburn, a Republican, was elected to the Illinois House of Representatives in 1966. From 1967 to 1977, Washburn served in the Illinois House of Representatives and he was the House Minority Leader in 1975. In 1976, Washburn ran for the United States House of Representatives from Illinois's 15th congressional district. He lost the five-way Republican primary to Tom Corcoran, who would go on to beat Democratic incumbent Tim Lee Hall. Washburn served as Director of the Illinois Department of Veterans Affairs. In 1981, he was elected the first full-time mayor of Morris, Illinois. He served for three terms before losing reelection in 1993. Washburn died in Morris, Illinois on August 8, 2007. The airport in Morris, IL is named in his honor.
