= Goudyloch E. Dyer =

American politician and librarian

Giddy Dyer

Member of the Illinois House of Representatives
- In office 1969–1981

Personal details
- Born: Goudyloch Safford Erwin; May 28, 1919 Atlanta, Georgia, U.S.
- Died: February 28, 2008 (aged 88) Davidson, North Carolina, U.S.
- Party: Republican
- Spouse: Robert C. Dyer
- Education: Agnes Scott College (BA)

Goudyloch Safford (née Erwin) "Giddy" Dyer (May 23, 1919 – February 28, 2008) was an American politician and librarian who served as a member of the Illinois House of Representatives.

== Early life and education ==
Born in Atlanta, Georgia, Dyer grew up in Davidson, North Carolina. She graduated from Agnes Scott College in 1938.

== Career ==
Dyer worked as a children's librarian in New York before marrying Robert C. Dyer. Dyer and her husband moved to Chicago and lived in Western Springs before settling in Hinsdale, Illinois, where she became involved with the Republican Party and served on the DuPage County, Illinois Board. From 1969 to 1981, Dyer served as a member of the Illinois House of Representatives. Dyer was one of 2,000 delegates to the 1981 White House Conference on Aging.

Considered a progressive among Republicans of her time, Dyer was instrumental in enacting the county's first air pollution ordinance and worked to pass a state Equal Rights Amendmeent (which ultimately failed in the state Senate). The first female member of county board, she experienced sexist discrimination. Dyer split with the Republican party with the ascendance of Reagan conservatism.

In the 2020 miniseries Mrs. America, Dyer was portrayed by Laura de Carteret.

== Personal life ==
Dyer died of heart failure at her home in Davidson, North Carolina.
