= Don Manzullo =

American politician (born 1944)

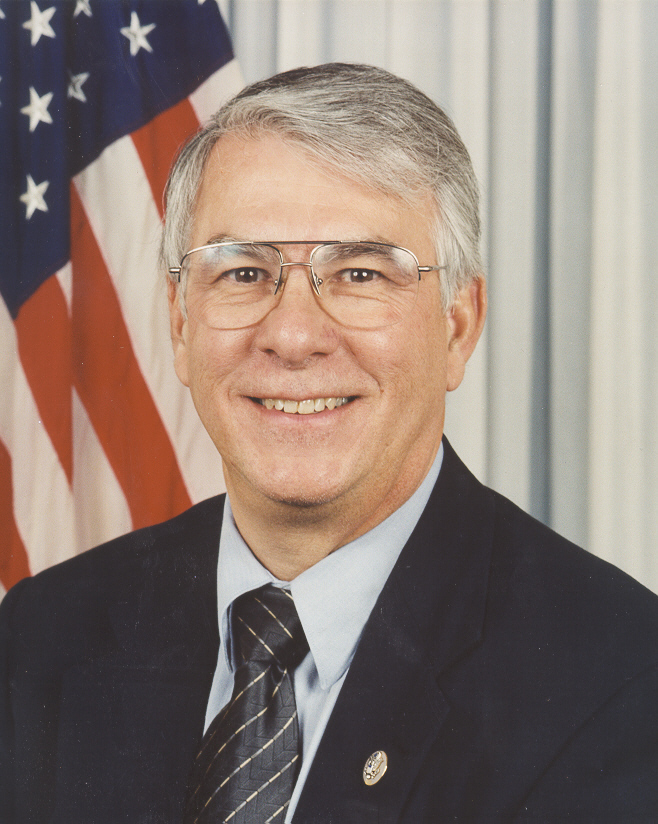

Chair of the House Small Business Committee
- In office January 3, 2001 – January 3, 2007
- Preceded by: Jim Talent
- Succeeded by: Nydia Velázquez

Member of the U.S. House of Representatives from Illinois's 16th district
- In office January 3, 1993 – January 3, 2013
- Preceded by: John W. Cox Jr.
- Succeeded by: Adam Kinzinger

Personal details
- Born: Donald Anthony Manzullo; March 24, 1944 (age 82) Rockford, Illinois, U.S.
- Party: Republican
- Spouse: Freda Teslik
- Education: American University (BA); Marquette University (JD)
- Manzullo's voice Manzullo supporting legislation to improve the calculation of subsidy rates for SBA loans. Recorded March 31, 2004

Donald Anthony Manzullo (born March 24, 1944) is an American lawyer and politician who served as the U.S. representative for Illinois's 16th congressional district, from 1993 to 2013. He is a member of the Republican Party. From 2001 to 2007 he served as Chairman of the Committee on Small Business, and from January 2011 to January 2013 he served as Chairman of the Foreign Affairs Subcommittee on Asia and the Pacific. He was defeated in the 2012 Republican Primary on March 20, 2012.

Manzullo served as the president and CEO of the Korea Economic Institute between 2012 and 2018.

== Early life, education, and law career ==
Don Manzullo was born in Rockford, Illinois and attended Auburn High School, graduating in 1962. He earned a bachelor's degree from American University in Washington, D.C. in 1967 and a J.D. degree from Marquette University Law School in Milwaukee, Wisconsin in 1970. Manzullo practiced as an attorney in Oregon, Illinois before entering politics.

== U.S. House of Representatives ==
=== Elections ===
1990

Incumbent Republican U.S. Congresswoman Lynn Morley Martin, of Illinois's 16th congressional district, decided to retire in order to run for the U.S. Senate. Manzullo ran in the Republican primary, but lost to State Representative John Hallock, Jr. 54%-46%. In the general election, Hallock was defeated by Democrat John W. Cox Jr., a city attorney.

1992

Manzullo ran for the 16th district again in 1992. He won the Republican primary, defeating State Senator Jack Schaffer 56%-44%. In the general election, he defeated the incumbent 56%-44%.

1994–2006

During this time period, Manzullo was never challenged in the Republican primary. He won re-election every two years with at least 60% of the vote, and was completely unopposed in 1998.

2008

Manzullo defeated Democrat Bob Abboud, the Mayor of Barrington Hills, 61%-36%.

2010

Manzullo defeated Democrat George Gaulrapp, the Mayor of Freeport, 65%-31%.

2012

Illinois' congressional map was significantly altered after the 2010 census. Manzullo's district underwent some of the most dramatic changes. For most of the last century and a half, the 16th and its predecessors had stretched from the Rockford area to the northwestern corner of the state, though from 1993 to 2013 it stretched as far as McHenry County in the Chicago suburbs. Indeed, the addition of McHenry County helped Manzullo defeat Cox in 1992. The reconfigured 16th retained Manzullo's home in Ogle County and most of Rockford's suburbs. However, most of its western portion, including more than half of Rockford itself, was shifted to the 17th District. To make up for the loss in population, the 16th was pushed well to the east, and now stretched from the Wisconsin border to the Indiana border, essentially wrapping around the collar counties. The new map drew the home of freshman 11th district incumbent Adam Kinzinger, a somewhat more moderate Republican, into the 16th.

Despite this dramatic remap, the new 16th was still geographically more Manzullo's district than Kinzinger's. The new 16th included roughly 44 percent of Manzullo's former territory and only 31 percent of Kinzinger's. Manzullo was backed by conservative groups including FreedomWorks, the American Conservative Union, and various Tea Party groups, while Kinzinger was backed by House Majority Leader Eric Cantor. Kinzinger defeated Manzullo in the Republican primary 56%-44% and later went on to win the general election.

=== Tenure ===
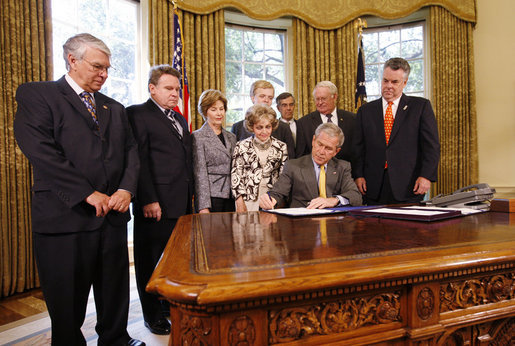
Congressman Manzullo attends a bill signing in the Oval Office

Manzullo had a very conservative voting record; indeed, for much of his tenure he was one of the most (if not the most) conservative members of the Illinois delegation. He has a lifetime American Conservative Union rating of 96, the highest in the Illinois delegation. He was a member of the Republican Study Committee. His views on such issues as abortion also follow this trend; he has a 100% approval rating from the National Right to Life Committee since 1997. He is also a strong supporter of the American Land Rights Association.

During his tenure in Congress, Manzullo authored 17 bills that were signed into law by the President and altered the direction of 18 other bills that also became law. He also significantly influenced over 50 administrative actions by the Executive Branch through regulatory changes or alterations to internal policy.

Manzullo spent most of his career working on issues related to manufacturing. He was featured on the cover of The Manufacturer because of his work with small business-related policy. Manzullo was the chairman of the Committee on Small Business from 2001 to 2007. He held over sixty hearings during this time to investigate the phenomenon of corporate outsourcing. Manzullo has also worked on transportation issues. His ability to gain great funding for highway improvements within his district has given him somewhat of a reputation as a pork barreller. He authored a law that requires clinics to report instances of child abuse. Manzullo co-founded and co-chaired the bipartisan House Manufacturing Caucus and also served as a co-chair of the House Automotive Caucus.

In November 2009, Manzullo was criticized by some constituents for calling [Islam] a "savage religion." He was referring to the religion of the detainees at the Guantanamo, Cuba prison that are being considered for transfer to a Thomson, Illinois prison located in his district. He later apologized for the comment, saying that he was not referring generally to Islam, but to terrorists who "believe and practice a violent, anti-modernity version of Wahhabism in which they seek to impose a new caliphate."

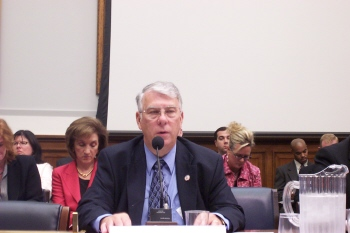
Manzullo testifies in front of a Transportation Committee subcommittee, advocating for increased use of the regional airport in Rockford as a way to decrease crowding at Chicago's other airports.

During his time in Congress, Manzullo worked avidly to ensure "the safety of the American people". He consistently supported the interests of the American Security Council Foundation and the Center for Security Politics. At one point, Manzullo worked on an appeal to President Barack Obama to forgo his plan to move over 200 Taliban and al Qaeda terrorist suspects from Guantanamo Bay detention camp to northern Illinois for detainment. He instead advocated for the creation of a new federal prison, the Thomson Correctional Facility, as a new hub in the already vastly over capacity prison system.

Manzullo has offered support to British American Tobacco in its campaign against the Australian government's decision to compel tobacco companies to only offer their products in plain packaging in an effort to reduce smoking rates, particularly amongst young people.

To fund his campaigns for re-election, Manzullo receives financing from a number of contributors, foremost among them Honeywell International, which donated $10,000 towards his last election. He has also received amounts of $5,000 or more from New York Life Insurance, American Society of Anesthesiologists, AFLAC Incorporated, and the American Bankers Association. In total, 58% of his funds were drawn from private sources, and 40% from PAC contributions; none of his own money is used to finance his campaigns.

Manzullo served as the chairman on the House Subcommittee on Asia and the Pacific from 2011 to 2013.

Manzullo was a member of the Republican National Committee.

=== Committee assignments ===
- Committee on Financial Services
  - Subcommittee on Capital Markets, Insurance, and Government-Sponsored Enterprises
  - Subcommittee on Financial Institutions and Consumer Credit
  - Subcommittee on International Monetary Policy and Trade
- Committee on Foreign Affairs
  - Subcommittee on Asia and the Pacific (Chair)
  - Subcommittee on the Middle East and South Asia

=== Caucus memberships ===
- African and Investment Caucus
- Congressional Wine Caucus
- House Diabetes Caucus
- House Manufacturing Caucus (Founder and co-chair)
- House Republican Policy Committee Task Force on Manufacturing (Chairman)
- International Conservation Caucus
- National Innovation Initiative
  - Council on Competitiveness Steering Committee

== Post-congressional career ==
On January 4, 2013, after his congressional term ended, Manzullo became the president and CEO of the Korea Economic Institute, a Washington think tank. He retired in June 2018.

In February 2013, Chicago Rockford International Airport honored Manzullo by naming the airport's international terminal "Donald A. Manzullo International Terminal." While in Congress, Manzullo worked to secure funds and U.S. Customs inspection service for the terminal, which opened in 2006 as the third international terminal in Illinois.

== Electoral history ==
2000, Illinois's 16th congressional district election results
Candidates	Party	Votes	%
Charles Hendrickson	Democratic Party	88,781	33%
Don Manzullo	Republican Party	178,174	67%

2002, Illinois's 16th congressional district election results
Candidates	Party	Votes	%
John Kutsch	Democratic Party	55,487	29%
Don Manzullo	Republican Party	133,339	71%

2004, Illinois's 16th congressional district election results
Candidates	Party	Votes	%
John Kutsch	Democratic Party	90,266	30.9%
Don Manzullo	Republican Party	201,976	69.1%

2006, Illinois's 16th congressional district election results
Candidates	Party	Votes	%
Richard D. Auman	Democratic Party	61,105	33%
Don Manzullo	Republican Party	121,331	66%

2008, Illinois's 16th congressional district election results
Candidates	Party	Votes	%
Robert Abboud	Democratic Party	112,287	36.1%
Don Manzullo	Republican Party	189,511	60.9%

2010, Illinois's 16th congressional district election results
Candidates	Party	Votes	%
George Gaulrapp	Democratic Party	65,935	31.0%
Don Manzullo	Republican Party	138100	65.0%

2012 Illinois 16th Congressional District Republican primary results.
Party	Candidate	Votes	%
Republican	Adam Kinzinger	45,546	53.9
Republican	Don Manzullo (Incumbent)	38,889	46.1
Total votes		84,435	100.0

== Personal life ==
Manzullo is married to the former Freda Teslik and is the father of three adult children. He lives in Rockford.

U.S. House of Representatives
Preceded by John W. Cox Jr.	Member of the U.S. House of Representatives from Illinois's 16th congressional district 1993–2013	Succeeded by Adam Kinzinger
Preceded by Jim Talent	Chair of the House Small Business Committee; 2001–2007	Succeeded by Nydia Velázquez
U.S. order of precedence (ceremonial)
Preceded by Philip Sharp as Former U.S. Representative	Order of precedence of the United States as Former U.S. Representative	Succeeded by Lacy Clay as Former U.S. Representative
