= List of Communist Party USA election results =

List of Communist Party USA members who have run for public office

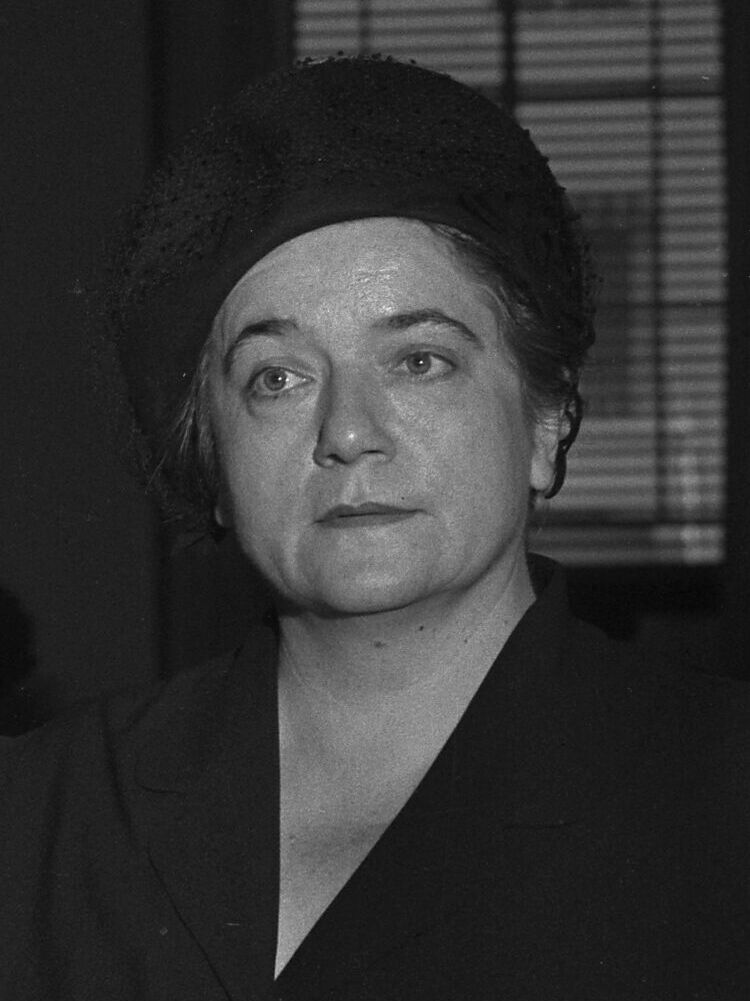
Bernadette Doyle, an open member of the Communist Party who received 605,393 votes in the nonpartisan primary for California State Superintendent of Public Instruction in 1950

This is a list of members of the Communist Party USA (CPUSA) who have run for elected office in the United States.

Currently, CPUSA does not regularly field candidates, aiming to avoid spoiling progressive Democratic candidates. Discussions and debates about running candidates have occurred within the party; in 2021, CPUSA chairman Joe Sims said, "We really can’t be a political party if we don’t run candidates". In 2025, CPUSA declared that it had candidates "on the ballot in at least four states".

CPUSA has run candidates on an explicit Communist ticket, on tickets of third parties (such as the Nonpartisan League), and on Democratic tickets.

As of 2024, no CPUSA member has been elected to federal office, one has been elected to state office, and several have been elected to local government. See also: List of Communist Party USA members who have held office in the United States.

== Presidential elections ==
Communist Party USA candidates for president and vice president
Year	President	Vice president	Votes	Percent	Name
1924	William Z. Foster	Benjamin Gitlow	38,669	0.1%	Workers Party of America
1928	William Z. Foster	Benjamin Gitlow	48,551	0.1%	Workers (Communist); Party of America
1932	William Z. Foster	James W. Ford	103,307	0.3%	Communist Party USA
1936	Earl Browder	James W. Ford	79,315	0.2%	Communist Party USA
1940	Earl Browder	James W. Ford	48,557	0.1%	Communist Party USA
1948	No candidate; endorsed Henry Wallace	No candidate; endorsed Glen H. Taylor	N/A		Communist Party USA
1952	No candidate; endorsed Vincent Hallinan	No candidate; endorsed Charlotta Bass	N/A		Communist Party USA
1968	Charlene Mitchell	Michael Zagarell	1,077	nil%	Communist Party USA
1972	Gus Hall	Jarvis Tyner	25,597	nil%	Communist Party USA
1976	Gus Hall	Jarvis Tyner	58,709	0.1%	Communist Party USA
1980	Gus Hall	Angela Davis	44,933	0.1%	Communist Party USA
1984	Gus Hall	Angela Davis	36,386	nil%	Communist Party USA

== Congressional elections ==
Year	Candidate	Chamber	State	District	Votes	%	Result	Notes	Ref
1992	Denise Winebrenner Edwards	House	Pennsylvania	18	3,650	1.44%	Lost	ran as independent	
1992	John Rummel	House	New Jersey	13	1,525	1.05%	Lost	ran as CPUSA candidate	
1988	Mark Almberg	House	Illinois	8	1,937	1.34%	Lost	ran as CPUSA candidate	
1988	John Rummel	House	New Jersey	14	442	0.29%	Lost	ran as CPUSA candidate	
1984	Laura Ross	House	Massachusetts	8	15,810	8.08%	Lost	ran as CPUSA candidate	
1984	Ishmael Flory	Senate	Illinois	At-Large	4,802	0.1%	Lost	ran as CPUSA candidate	
1984	Lucille Bieger	Senate	Kansas	At-Large	9,380	0.94%	Lost	ran as CPUSA candidate	
1984	Samuel Webb	Senate	Michigan	At-Large	1,196	0.03%	Lost	ran as CPUSA candidate	
1982	Joelle Fishman	House	Connecticut	3	696	0.38%	Lost	ran as CPUSA candidate	
1982	Joelle Fishman	House	Connecticut	3	696	0.38%	Lost	ran as Citizens Party candidate	
1980	Charles Wilson	Senate	Illinois	At-Large	11,453	0.25%	Lost	ran as CPUSA candidate	
1980	William Scott	Senate	New York	At-Large	4,161	0.07%	Lost	ran as CPUSA candidate	
1980	Frank Kinces	Senate	Pennsylvania	At-Large	3,334	0.08%	Lost	ran as CPUSA candidate	
1980	Rick Nagin	Senate	Ohio	At-Large	42,410	1.05%	Lost	ran as independent	
1980	Joelle Fishman	House	Connecticut	3	2711	1.21%	Lost	ran as Citizens Party candidate	
1978	Joelle Fishman	House	Connecticut	3	3,068	1.84%	Lost	ran as CPUSA candidate	
1976	Joelle Fishman	House	Connecticut	3	2,947	1.32%	Lost	ran as CPUSA candidate	
1976	Matt Savola	Senate	Minnesota	At-Large	2,214	0.12%	Lost	ran as CPUSA candidate	
1976	Herbert Aptheker	Senate	New York	At-Large	25,141	0.38%	Lost	ran as CPUSA candidate	
1976	Frank Kinces	Senate	Pennsylvania	At-Large	2,097	0.05%	Lost	ran as CPUSA candidate	
1976	Margaret Cann	Senate	Rhode Island	At-Large	912	0.23%	Lost	ran as CPUSA candidate	
1974	Ishmael Flory	Senate	Illinois	At-Large	5,873	0.2%	Lost	ran as CPUSA candidate	
1974	Laura Ross	House	Massachusetts	8	6,421	5.27%	Lost	ran as CPUSA candidate	
1942	Albert Jason Lima	House	California	1	5,703	6.79%	Lost	ran as CPUSA candidate	
1942	Walter Raymond Lambert	House	California	5	6,749	7.30%	Lost	ran as CPUSA candidate	
1942	Clarence Patton	House	California	6	8,532	7.27%	Lost	ran as CPUSA candidate	
1940	Anita Whitney	Senate	California	At-Large	97,478	3.60%	Lost	ran as CPUSA candidate	
1940	Albert Jason Lima	House	California	1	5,647	5.09%	Lost	ran as CPUSA candidate	
1940	Earl Browder	House	New York	14	3,080	13.56%	Lost	ran as CPUSA candidate	
1938	Nora Conklin	House	California	3	8,271	6.47%	Lost	ran as CPUSA candidate	
1938	Dave L. Saunders	House	California	6	7,015	5.58%	Lost	ran as CPUSA candidate	
1936	Lawrence Ross	House	California	5	4,545	5.20%	Lost	ran as CPUSA candidate	
1934	Patrick Chambers	Senate	California	At-Large	1,025	0.05%	Lost	ran as write-in candidate and open Communist Party member	
1934	Alexander Noral	House	California	5	5,933	6.20%	Lost	ran as CPUSA candidate	
1946	Alice Burke	Senate	Virginia	At-Large	3,318	1.31%	Lost	ran as CPUSA candidate	
1942	Alice Burke	Senate	Virginia	At-Large	2,041	2.34%	Lost	ran as CPUSA candidate	
1940	Alice Burke	Senate	Virginia	At-Large	8,250	2.81%	Lost	ran as CPUSA candidate (Note: Although official statistics do not list Burke's party, she was nominated by the Communist Party and was an open Communist. Ballots did not state party affiliation.)	
1936	Donald Burke	Senate	Virginia	At-Large	8,907	3.34%	Lost	ran as CPUSA candidate	
1934	Max Bedacht	Senate	New York	At-Large	45,396	1.23%	Lost	ran as CPUSA candidate	
1930	Sherman Bell	Senate	Tennessee	At-Large	3,392	1.57%	Lost	ran as CPUSA candidate	
1924	Antoinette Konikow	Senate	Massachusetts	At-Large	12,716	1.13%	Lost	ran as Workers Party candidate	

== Statewide elections ==
Year	Candidate	Office	State	District	Votes	%	Result	Notes	Ref
1990	Evelina Alarcón	Secretary of State	California	At-Large	144,577	1.93%	Lost	ran as Peace and Freedom Party candidate	
1986	Helen Kruth	Treasurer	Minnesota	At-Large	13,817	1.03%	Lost	ran as CPUSA candidate	
1985	George Fishman	Governor	New Jersey	At-Large	1,901	0.1%	Lost	ran as CPUSA candidate	
1984	Marcia Davis	Trustee	Illinois	At-Large	56289	0.44%	Lost	ran as CPUSA candidate; vote for 3	
1984	Richard Giovanoni	Trustee	Illinois	At-Large	50724	0.4%	Lost	ran as CPUSA candidate; vote for 3	
1984	Elsie Rosado	Trustee	Illinois	At-Large	37,311	0.29%	Lost	ran as CPUSA candidate; vote for 3	
1982	Richard Giovanoni	House	Illinois	7	530	2.08%	Lost	ran as CPUSA candidate	
1982	Helen Kruth	Treasurer	Minnesota	At-Large	28,131	1.69%	Lost	ran as CPUSA candidate	
1980	Barbara Browne	Trustee	Illinois	At-Large	46,956	0.39%	Lost	ran as CPUSA candidate; vote for 3	
1980	Mark Almberg	Trustee	Illinois	At-Large	22,793	0.19%	Lost	ran as CPUSA candidate; vote for 3	
1980	Richard Rozoff	Trustee	Illinois	At-Large	22,406	0.19%	Lost	ran as CPUSA candidate; vote for 3	
1978	Helen Kruth	Auditor	Minnesota	At-Large	22,576	1.51%	Lost	ran as CPUSA candidate	
1976	Ishmael Flory	Governor	Illinois	At-Large	10,091	0.22%	Lost	ran as CPUSA candidate	
1976	Theodore Pearson	Attorney General	Illinois	At-Large	11,154	0.25%	Lost	ran as CPUSA candidate	
1976	Frances Gabow	Secretary of State	Illinois	At-Large	8,271	0.18%	Lost	ran as CPUSA candidate	
1976	Charles Hunter	Comptroller	Illinois	At-Large	10,992	0.25%	Lost	ran as CPUSA candidate	
1976	Mark Almberg	Trustee	Illinois	At-Large	25,641	0.21%	Lost	ran as CPUSA candidate	
1976	Altherna Medith	Trustee	Illinois	At-Large	18,948	0.16%	Lost	ran as CPUSA candidate	
1976	Jack Kling	Trustee	Illinois	At-Large	17,414	0.14%	Lost	ran as CPUSA candidate	
1972	Ishmael Flory	Governor	Illinois	At-Large	4,592	0.1%	Lost	ran as CPUSA candidate	
1950	Bernadette Doyle	Superintendent of Public Instruction	California	At-Large	605,393	25.47%	Lost	nonpartisan primary; open Communist Party member	
1946	Archie Brown	Governor	California	At-Large	22,606	0.88%	Lost	ran as write-in candidate and open Communist Party member	
1942	Pettis Perry	Secretary of State	California	At-Large	37,972	1.84%	Lost	ran as CPUSA candidate	
1942	Anita Whitney	Controller	California	At-Large	89,520	4.60%	Lost	ran as CPUSA candidate	
1942	Kenneth May	Treasurer	California	At-Large	80,435	4.20%	Lost	ran as CPUSA candidate	
1938	Leo Gallagher	Secretary of State	California	At-Large	150,760	6.36%	Lost	ran as CPUSA candidate	
1938	Anita Whitney	Controller	California	At-Large	98,791	4.20%	Lost	ran as CPUSA candidate	
1938	Pettis Perry	Board of Equalization	California	4	62,745	5.47%	Lost	ran as CPUSA candidate	
1934	Samuel Adams Darcy	Governor	California	At-Large	5,826	0.25%	Lost	ran as CPUSA candidate	
1934	Pettis Perry	Lieutenant Governor	California	At-Large	10,528	0.47%	Lost	ran as CPUSA candidate	
1934	Harold J. Ashe	Secretary of State	California	At-Large	47,585	2.25%	Lost	ran as CPUSA candidate	
1934	Anita Whitney	Controller	California	At-Large	100,820	4.94%	Lost	ran as CPUSA candidate	
1934	Archie Brown	Treasurer	California	At-Large	25,725	1.21%	Lost	ran as CPUSA candidate	
1934	Pete Garcia	Board of Equalization	California	2	20,424	4.68%	Lost	ran as CPUSA candidate	

== State legislature elections ==
Year	Candidate	Office	State	District	Votes	%	Result	Notes	Ref
2006	Kenneth Jones	Senator	Missouri	4	559	3.01%	Lost	Democratic primary	
1996	David Mirtz	Assembly	New York	80	265	0.85%	Lost	ran as CPUSA candidate	
1994	Mark Almberg	Senate	Illinois	17	21	0.08%	Lost	ran as write-in candidate	
1992	David Mirtz	Assembly	New York	71	575	2.31%	Lost	ran as "Tax the Rich" candidate	
1942	Thomas R. Farrell	Assembly	California	15	3,546	10.62%	Lost	ran as CPUSA candidate	
1938	Herbert Nugent	Assembly	California	26	1,989	10.51%	Lost	ran as CPUSA candidate	
1936	Sam Jaye	Assembly	California	20	1,307	11.40%	Lost	ran as CPUSA candidate	

== Local elections ==
Year	Candidate	Office	City	District	Votes	%	Result	Notes	Ref
2025	Christopher Semok	City Council	Columbia Falls	At-Large	509	21.6%	Won	nonpartisan election	
2025	Hannah Shvets	Common Council	Ithaca	5	243	64.12%	Won	ran as Democratic candidate and open Communist Party member	
2025	Daniel Carson	City Council	Bangor	At-large	2,512	14.3%	Won	nonpartisan election	
2025	Luisa de Paula Santos	School Committee	Cambridge	At-large	2,399	10.29%	Won	nonpartisan election	
2025	Luke Rotello	City Council	Northampton	5	592	42.92%	Lost	nonpartisan election	
2025	Colton Baldus	Park Board	Minneapolis	5	1,661	6.17%	Lost	nonpartisan election	
2022	Steven Estrada	City Council	Long Beach	1	441	8.53%	Lost	nonpartisan election	
2019	Denise Winebrenner Edwards	Borough Council	Wilkinsburg	3	922	65.34%	Won	ran as Democratic candidate and open Communist Party member	
2019	Tony Pecinovsky	Alderperson	St. Louis	14	622	47.96%	Lost	Democratic primary	
2019	Wahsayah Whitebird	Alderperson	Ashland	6	52	55.32%	Won	nonpartisan election	
2017	Denise Winebrenner Edwards	Borough Council	Wilkinsburg	3	613	55.32%	Won	ran as Democratic candidate and open Communist Party member; opponent was write-in; 2-year seat	
2017	Denise Winebrenner Edwards	Borough Council	Wilkinsburg	3	547	23.77%	Lost	ran as Democratic candidate and open Communist Party member; vote for 2, 3rd place	
2013	Dominic Giannone III	City Council	Weymouth	1	77	9.76%	Lost	nonpartisan primary, did not advance to general	
2005	Denise Winebrenner Edwards	Borough Council	Wilkinsburg				Won		
2002	Gary Dotterman	City Council	Boston	9			Lost	nonpartisan election	
2001	Denise Winebrenner Edwards	Borough Council	Wilkinsburg				Won		
1999	Kenneth Jones	Alderperson	St. Louis	22	1,231	58.93%	Won	ran as Democratic candidate and open Communist Party member	
1997	Denise Winebrenner Edwards	Borough Council	Wilkinsburg				Won		
1995	Kenneth Jones	Alderperson	St. Louis	22	767	55.58%	Won	ran as independent	
1993	Gary Dotterman	City Council	Boston	At-large	5,404	1.81%	Lost	nonpartisan primary, did not advance to general	
1991	Kenneth Jones	Alderperson	St. Louis	22	1,501	72.65%	Won	ran as independent	
1987	Kenneth Jones	Alderperson	St. Louis	22	1,187	53.93%	Won	ran as independent	
1983	Kenneth Jones (Note: Also called Kenny Jones.)	Alderperson	St. Louis	22	1,566	60.07%	Won	ran as independent	
1977	Joelle Fishman	Mayor	New Haven	At-Large	417	1.04%	Lost	ran as CPUSA candidate	
1975	Joelle Fishman	Mayor	New Haven	At-Large	811	2.38%	Lost	ran as CPUSA candidate	

== See also ==
- Other lists:
  - List of socialist members of the United States Congress
  - List of elected socialist mayors in the United States
  - List of Democratic Socialists of America public officeholders
  - List of Green politicians who have held office in the United States
- History of the socialist movement in the United States
- History of the Communist Party USA
