= 1980 United States presidential election in Illinois =

- November 4, 1980
- Turnout: 76.24%

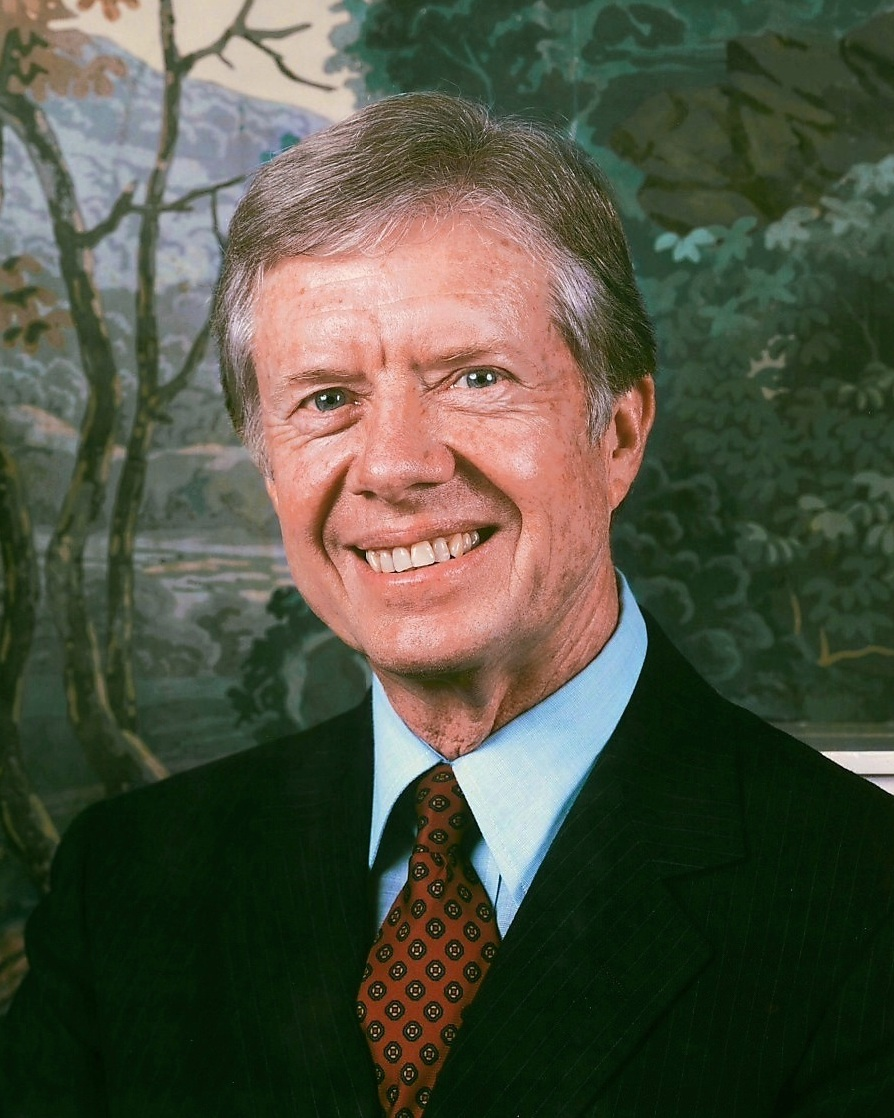

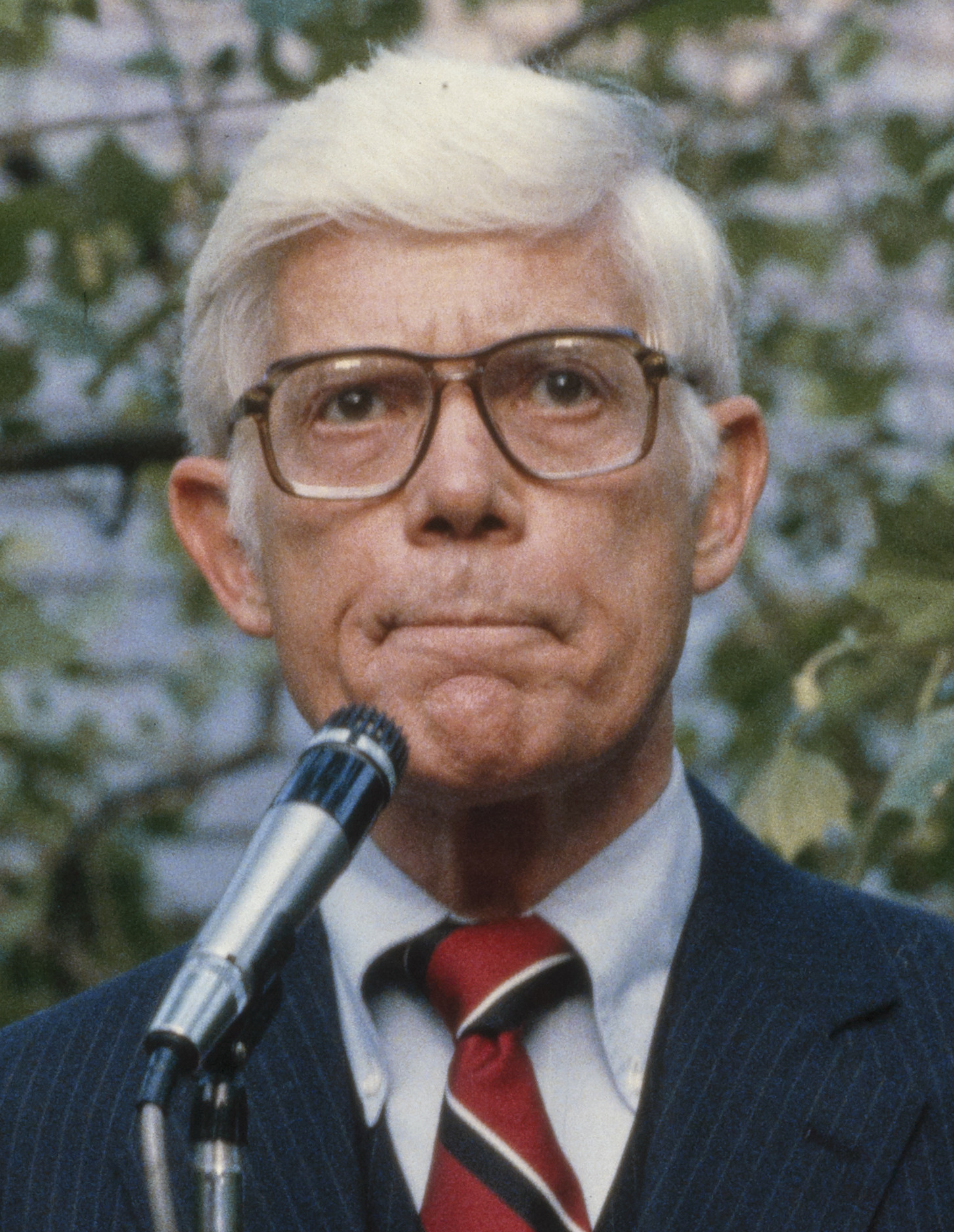
Nominee	Ronald Reagan	Jimmy Carter	John B. Anderson
Party	Republican	Democratic	Independent
Home state	California	Georgia	Illinois
Running mate	George H. W. Bush	Walter Mondale	Patrick Lucey
Electoral vote	26	0	0
Popular vote	2,358,049	1,981,413	346,754
Percentage	49.65%	41.72%	7.30%
County results
Reagan
40–50%
50–60%
60–70%
70–80%
Carter
40–50%
50–60%
President before election
Jimmy Carter
Democratic
Elected President
Ronald Reagan
Republican

The 1980 United States presidential election in Illinois took place on November 4, 1980. All 50 states and The District of Columbia, were part of the 1980 United States presidential election. State voters chose 26 electors to the Electoral College, who voted for president and vice president. Illinois voters chose between the Democratic ticket of incumbent president Jimmy Carter and vice president Walter Mondale, and the Republican ticket of Ronald Reagan and running mate George H. W. Bush, as well as the independent candidacy of John B. Anderson and running mate Patrick Lucey.

Illinois had voted Republican in the previous three presidential elections, and early analysis suggested that Reagan was a strong candidate against Carter in Dixie Southern Illinois. Nonetheless, at the beginning of the campaign trail one opinion poll suggested Reagan would lose to Carter by 26%, but the Republican campaign knew carrying a state which Gerald Ford had won four years ago to be essential and the state was heavily targeted by GOP campaigners. By mid-September, polls were showing Illinois as very close, and Carter was hit by political conflicts in Chicago between mayor Jane Byrne and State Senator Richard Daley.

Carter strategists did target the state in September and hoped that prospective Republican nominee John Anderson – who had run against Reagan in the Republican primary before launching his own independent presidential campaign – would take enough votes from Reagan for Carter to obtain a narrow victory. Polls in mid-October suggested that Illinois was "too close to call", and as election day neared, opinions fluctuated especially in the critical southern part of the state.

Ultimately Illinois—the state where Reagan was born and raised, and where Anderson served as a Congressman—was carried by the Republican ticket by a 7.93% margin of victory over the Democrats. Reagan won all but three counties, although Carter's 268,000-vote margin in massively populated Cook County meant Illinois nonetheless voted roughly 1.77% more Democratic than the nation at-large. Despite being Anderson's home state, the independent only won 7.30% of the popular vote in Illinois, or 346,754 votes, and he failed to carry any counties.

This would be the last time that Rock Island County voted Republican, as it has since turned sharply to the Democratic Party.

== Primaries ==
The primaries and general elections coincided with those for other federal offices (Senate and House), as well as those for state offices.

=== Turnout ===
Turnout in the primary elections was 40.41%, with a total of 2,331,148 ballots cast. The primaries saw a cumulative increase in turnout over the previous 1976 primaries.

Turnout during the general election was 76.24%, with 4,749,721 ballots cast.

State-run primaries were held for the Democratic and Republican parties on March 18. The Illinois primaries were viewed as significant in 1980, being viewed as the first large contest in a northern industrial state.

=== Democratic ===
1980 Illinois Democratic presidential primary
- March 18, 1980

179 Democratic National Convention delegates

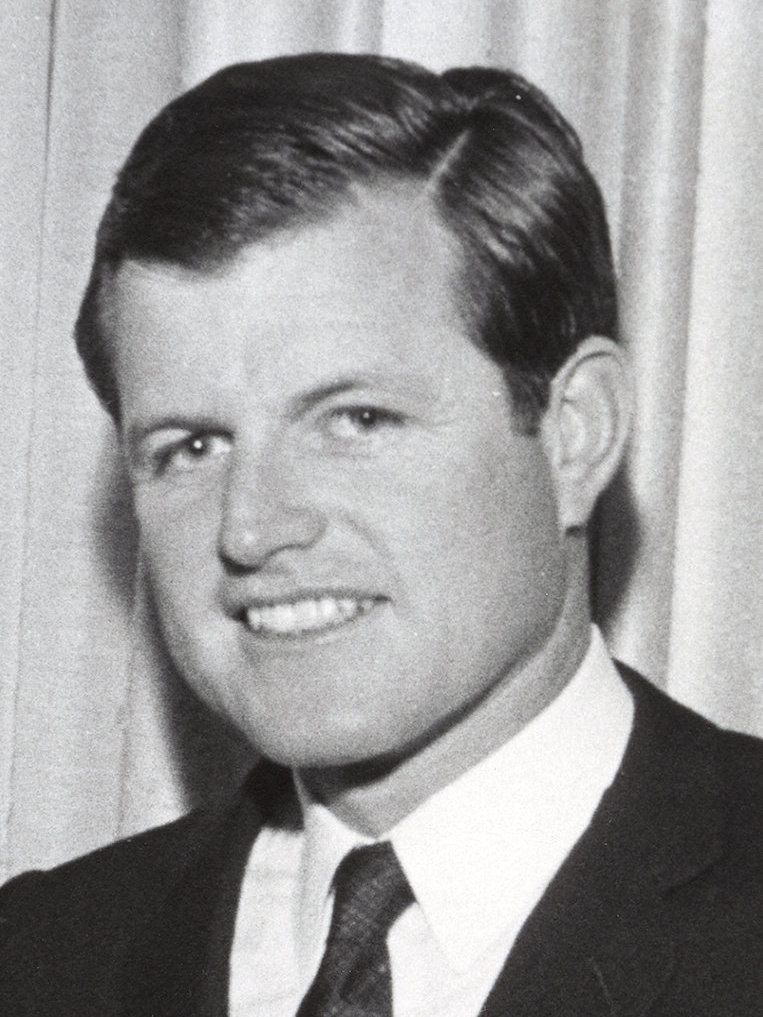
Candidate	Jimmy Carter	Ted Kennedy
Home state	Georgia	Massachusetts
Delegate count	165	14
Popular vote	780,787	359,875
Percentage	65.01%	29.96%

The 1980 Illinois Democratic presidential primary was held on March 18, 1980, in the U.S. state of Illinois as one of the Democratic Party's statewide nomination contests ahead of the 1980 presidential election.

The popular vote was a "beauty contest". Delegates were instead selected by direct-vote in each congressional district on delegate candidates who had either pledged to support a candidate or indicated they would be uncommitted. 138 delegates pledged to Jimmy Carter won, while only 14 delegates pledged to Kennedy won. Additionally, 13 uncommitted delegates won. At the state convention in April, Carter was awarded an additional 25 delegates out of the 28 delegates selected at the convention.

1980 Democratic presidential primary
Candidate	Votes	%	Delegates
Jimmy Carter (incumbent)	780,787	65.01	165
Edward M. Kennedy	359,875	29.96	14
Edmund G. Brown Jr.	39,168	3.26	0
Lyndon H. LaRouche Jr.	19,192	1.60	0
John B. Anderson (write-in)	1,643	0.14	0
Other write-ins	402	0.03	0
Uncommitted	—N/a	—N/a	16
Totals	1,201,067	100	179

=== Republican ===
1980 Illinois Republican presidential primary
- March 18, 1980
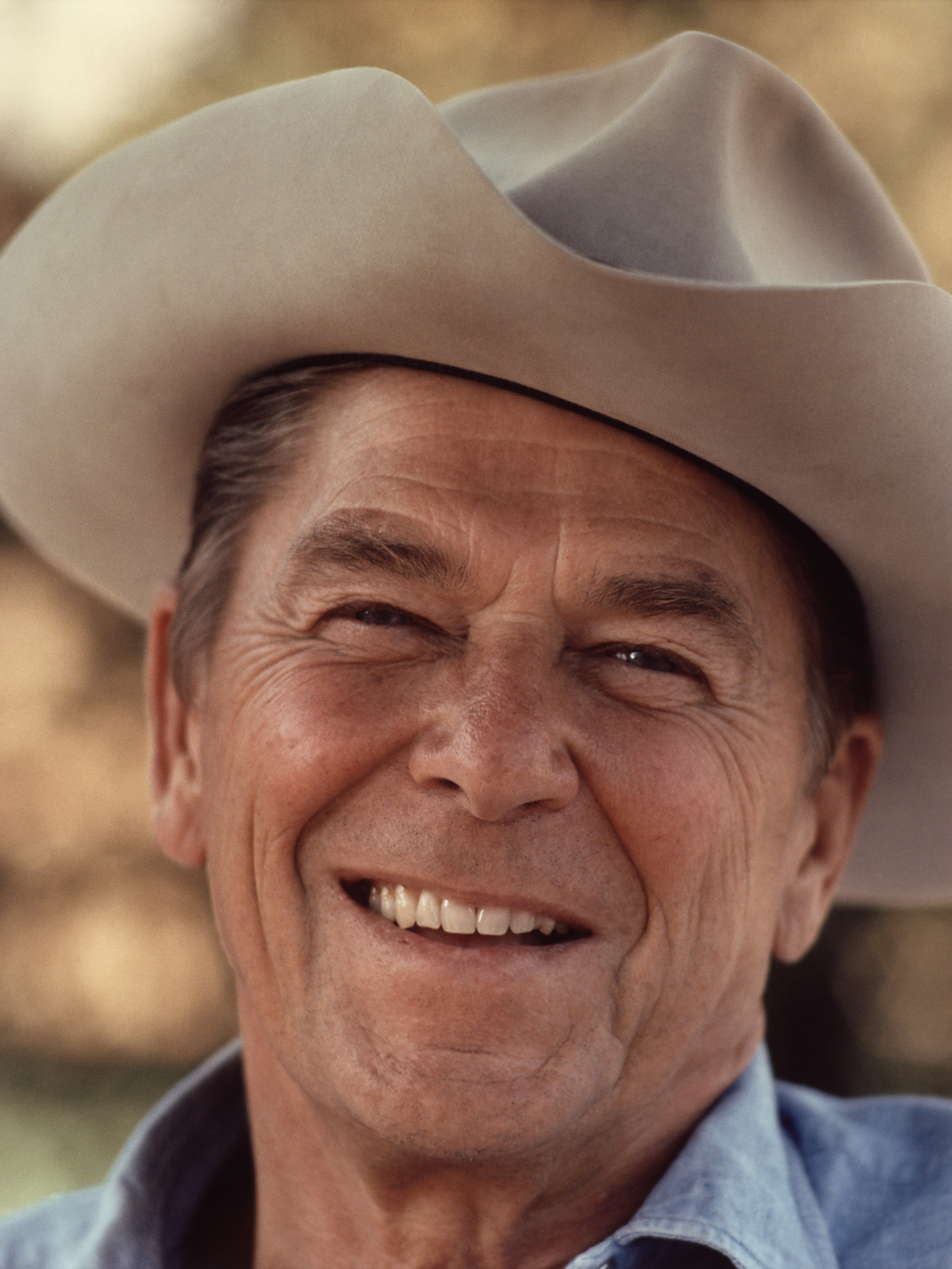

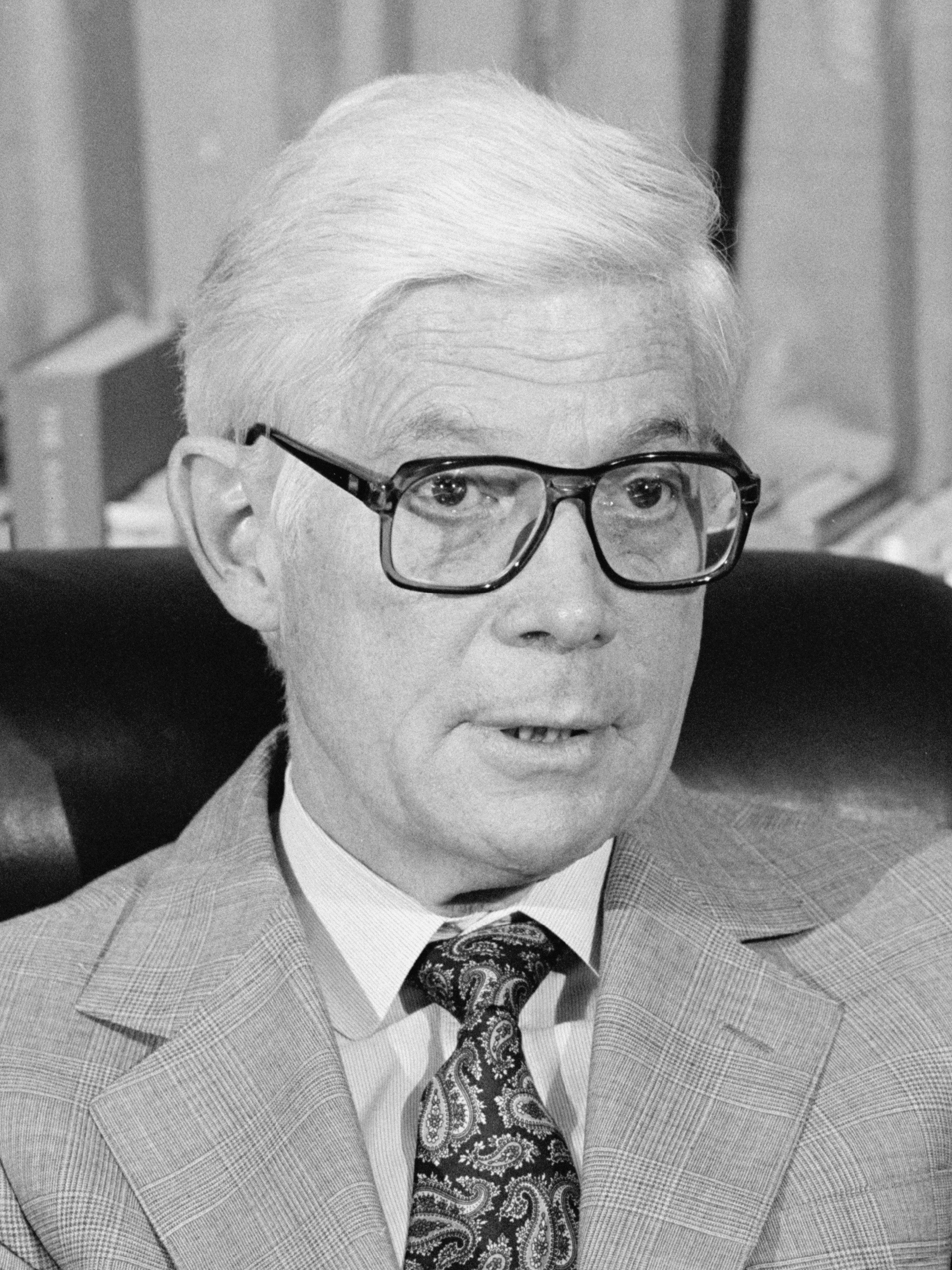

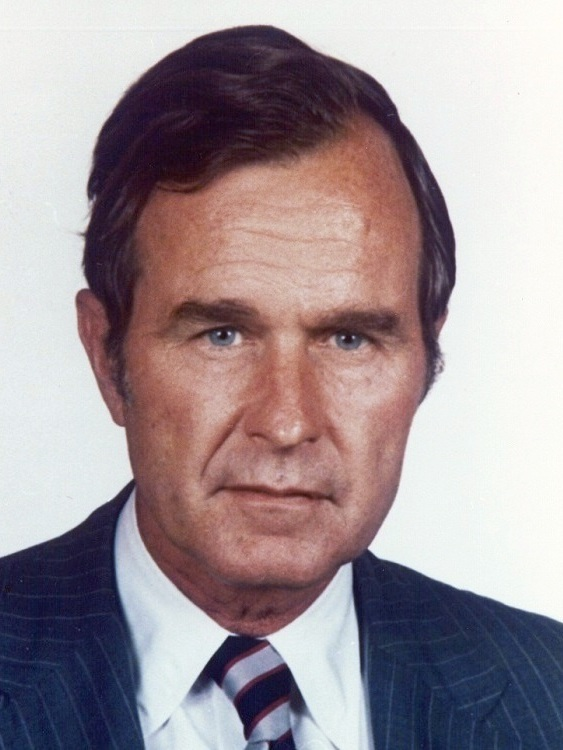

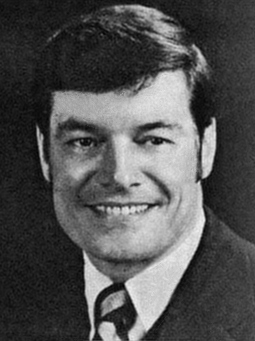
Candidate	Ronald Reagan	John B. Anderson
Home state	California	Illinois
Delegate count	52	39
Popular vote	547,355	415,193
Percentage	48.44%	36.74%
Candidate	George H. W. Bush	Phil Crane
Home state	Texas	Illinois
Delegate count	12	3
Popular vote	124,057	24,865
Percentage	10.98%	2.20%

The 1980 Illinois Republican presidential primary was held on March 18, 1980, in the U.S. state of Illinois as one of the Republican Party's statewide nomination contests ahead of the 1980 presidential election.

The primary was a so-called "blind primary" or "loophole primary". Under this format, the presidential preference vote was a “beauty contest”. Delegates were not selected based upon the preference vote for president, but rather directly voted upon by voters in each congressional district. Additionally, the presidential preferences of each delegate candidate was not listed on the ballot.

This primary saw a larger-than-usual turnout for an Illinois Republican primary, with more than a 400,000 vote increase over the 1976 Republican primary. This was attributed to both the appeal of Anderson and Reagan to independents, as well as crossover voting by Democrats who opted against voting in the Democratic primary (due to the Democrats lacking a close race).

In both the state's popular vote and delegate count, Ronald Reagan placed first, respectively followed by John B. Anderson, George Bush, and Phil Crane.

Three of the candidates had Illinois connections. Ronald Reagan was born in the state, while John B. Anderson and Phil Crane were both incumbent congressmen from the state. While John B. Anderson failed to win his home state, he performed strongly in certain areas of the state, particularly in the suburbs of Chicago. Phil Crane's securing of three delegates came despite him having already dropped-out of the race before the Illinois primary.

1980 Republican presidential primary
Candidate	Votes	%	Delegates
Ronald Reagan	547,355	48.44	40
John B. Anderson	415,193	36.74	34
George Bush	124,057	10.98	10
Philip M. Crane withdrew	24,865	2.20	3
Howard H. Baker Jr. withdrew	7,051	0.62	0
John B. Connally withdrew	4,548	0.40	0
V. A. Kelley	3,757	0.33	0
Robert Dole withdrew	1,843	0.16	0
Gerald Ford (write-in)	1,106	0.10	0
Other write-ins	306	0.03	0
Totals	1,130,081	100	87

== Results ==
Candidate	Running mate	Party	Electoral vote	Popular vote	
Candidate	Running mate	Party	Electoral vote	Count	Percentage
Ronald Reagan	George H. W. Bush	Republican	26	2,358,049	49.65%
Jimmy Carter (incumbent)	Walter Mondale (incumbent)	Democratic	0	1,981,413	41.72%
John B. Anderson	Patrick Lucey	Independent	0	346,754	7.30%
Edward E. Clark	David Koch	Libertarian	0	38,939	0.82%
Barry Commoner	LaDonna Harris	Citizens	0	10,692	0.23%
Gus Hall	Angela Davis	Communist	0	9,711	0.20%
Deirdre Griswold	Larry Holmes	Workers World	0	2,257	0.05%
Clifton DeBerry	Matilde Zimmermann	Socialist Workers	0	1,302	0.03%
Write-ins	—	—	0	604	0.01%

=== Results by county ===
County	Ronald Reagan Republican		Jimmy Carter Democratic		John B. Anderson Independent		Ed Clark Libertarian		Various candidates Other parties		Margin		Total votes cast
County	#	%	#	%	#	%	#	%	#	%	#	%	Total votes cast
Adams	19,842	62.17%	10,606	33.23%	1,202	3.77%	206	0.65%	61	0.19%	9,236	28.94%	31,917
Alexander	2,650	46.67%	2,925	51.51%	74	1.30%	17	0.30%	12	0.21%	-275	-4.84%	5,678
Bond	4,398	58.39%	2,834	37.63%	244	3.24%	40	0.53%	16	0.21%	1,564	20.76%	7,532
Boone	6,697	57.66%	3,175	27.34%	1,578	13.59%	145	1.25%	19	0.16%	3,522	30.32%	11,614
Brown	1,660	61.66%	950	35.29%	59	2.19%	19	0.71%	4	0.15%	710	26.37%	2,692
Bureau	11,484	61.79%	5,753	30.95%	1,093	5.88%	222	1.19%	35	0.19%	5,731	30.84%	18,587
Calhoun	1,591	54.96%	1,208	41.73%	76	2.63%	10	0.35%	10	0.35%	383	13.23%	2,895
Carroll	5,084	63.37%	2,154	26.85%	705	8.79%	61	0.76%	19	0.24%	2,930	36.52%	8,023
Cass	3,965	58.57%	2,543	37.56%	199	2.94%	55	0.81%	8	0.12%	1,422	21.01%	6,770
Champaign	33,329	50.99%	21,017	32.16%	9,972	15.26%	590	0.90%	452	0.69%	12,312	18.83%	65,360
Christian	8,770	54.69%	6,625	41.31%	499	3.11%	117	0.73%	25	0.16%	2,145	13.38%	16,036
Clark	5,476	63.19%	2,855	32.94%	243	2.80%	81	0.93%	11	0.13%	2,621	30.25%	8,666
Clay	4,447	61.20%	2,587	35.60%	187	2.57%	35	0.48%	10	0.14%	1,860	25.60%	7,266
Clinton	8,500	62.53%	4,470	32.88%	528	3.88%	71	0.52%	24	0.18%	4,030	29.65%	13,593
Coles	11,994	58.02%	6,743	32.62%	1,726	8.35%	142	0.69%	66	0.32%	5,251	25.40%	20,671
Cook	856,574	39.60%	1,124,584	51.99%	149,712	6.92%	15,354	0.71%	16,873	0.78%	-268,010	-12.39%	2,163,097
Crawford	5,894	60.70%	3,372	34.73%	341	3.51%	96	0.99%	7	0.07%	2,522	25.97%	9,710
Cumberland	3,159	59.73%	1,892	35.77%	190	3.59%	43	0.81%	5	0.09%	1,267	23.96%	5,289
DeKalb	16,370	53.91%	8,913	29.35%	4,526	14.91%	357	1.18%	199	0.66%	7,457	24.56%	30,365
DeWitt	4,648	63.29%	2,262	30.80%	368	5.01%	58	0.79%	8	0.11%	2,386	32.49%	7,344
Douglas	5,330	64.26%	2,564	30.91%	344	4.15%	44	0.53%	12	0.14%	2,766	33.35%	8,294
DuPage	182,308	64.02%	68,991	24.23%	29,810	10.47%	2,977	1.05%	663	0.23%	113,317	39.79%	284,749
Edgar	6,639	63.14%	3,394	32.28%	400	3.80%	68	0.65%	14	0.13%	3,245	30.86%	10,515
Edwards	2,556	68.14%	1,041	27.75%	118	3.15%	34	0.91%	2	0.05%	1,515	40.39%	3,751
Effingham	9,104	65.93%	4,229	30.63%	393	2.85%	62	0.45%	20	0.14%	4,875	35.30%	13,808
Fayette	6,523	62.67%	3,614	34.72%	229	2.20%	38	0.37%	4	0.04%	2,909	27.95%	10,408
Ford	5,024	69.64%	1,803	24.99%	328	4.55%	50	0.69%	9	0.12%	3,221	44.65%	7,214
Franklin	9,731	49.01%	9,425	47.47%	558	2.81%	104	0.52%	38	0.19%	306	1.54%	19,856
Fulton	10,316	54.42%	7,481	39.46%	838	4.42%	294	1.55%	28	0.15%	2,835	14.96%	18,957
Gallatin	1,700	49.05%	1,678	48.41%	78	2.25%	5	0.14%	5	0.14%	22	0.64%	3,466
Greene	4,224	59.33%	2,607	36.62%	220	3.09%	58	0.81%	11	0.15%	1,617	22.71%	7,120
Grundy	8,397	63.59%	3,970	30.07%	701	5.31%	110	0.83%	26	0.20%	4,427	33.52%	13,204
Hamilton	3,254	59.64%	1,990	36.47%	171	3.13%	38	0.70%	3	0.05%	1,264	23.17%	5,456
Hancock	6,597	62.32%	3,522	33.27%	383	3.62%	68	0.64%	15	0.14%	3,075	29.05%	10,585
Hardin	1,721	55.27%	1,314	42.20%	56	1.80%	13	0.42%	10	0.32%	407	13.07%	3,114
Henderson	2,443	57.54%	1,609	37.89%	143	3.37%	43	1.01%	8	0.19%	834	19.65%	4,246
Henry	14,506	59.93%	7,977	32.95%	1,440	5.95%	226	0.93%	57	0.24%	6,529	26.98%	24,206
Iroquois	11,247	73.38%	3,362	21.94%	592	3.86%	101	0.66%	25	0.16%	7,885	51.44%	15,327
Jackson	10,505	44.08%	10,291	43.19%	2,526	10.60%	192	0.81%	315	1.32%	214	0.89%	23,829
Jasper	3,548	63.22%	1,846	32.89%	157	2.80%	51	0.91%	10	0.18%	1,702	30.33%	5,612
Jefferson	8,972	54.91%	6,761	41.38%	506	3.10%	77	0.47%	24	0.15%	2,211	13.53%	16,340
Jersey	5,266	58.61%	3,324	36.99%	314	3.49%	59	0.66%	22	0.24%	1,942	21.62%	8,985
Jo Daviess	5,186	57.81%	2,678	29.85%	983	10.96%	92	1.03%	32	0.36%	2,508	27.96%	8,971
Johnson	3,201	65.49%	1,586	32.45%	84	1.72%	15	0.31%	2	0.04%	1,615	33.04%	4,888
Kane	64,106	61.77%	29,015	27.96%	9,179	8.84%	1,191	1.15%	293	0.28%	35,091	33.81%	103,784
Kankakee	23,810	58.25%	14,626	35.78%	1,802	4.41%	280	0.69%	355	0.87%	9,184	22.47%	40,873
Kendall	10,028	69.99%	3,143	21.94%	979	6.83%	146	1.02%	31	0.22%	6,885	48.05%	14,327
Knox	14,907	56.90%	8,749	33.40%	2,069	7.90%	382	1.46%	91	0.35%	6,158	23.50%	26,198
Lake	96,350	58.45%	48,287	29.29%	17,726	10.75%	1,905	1.16%	585	0.35%	48,063	29.16%	164,853
LaSalle	27,323	57.12%	16,818	35.16%	3,041	6.36%	518	1.08%	135	0.28%	10,505	21.96%	47,835
Lawrence	4,453	56.68%	3,030	38.57%	293	3.73%	70	0.89%	10	0.13%	1,423	18.11%	7,856
Lee	11,373	73.67%	3,170	20.53%	781	5.06%	97	0.63%	17	0.11%	8,203	53.14%	15,438
Livingston	11,544	68.62%	4,111	24.44%	980	5.83%	158	0.94%	30	0.18%	7,433	44.18%	16,823
Logan	9,681	67.39%	3,916	27.26%	650	4.52%	106	0.74%	13	0.09%	5,765	40.13%	14,366
Macon	28,298	52.45%	22,325	41.38%	2,804	5.20%	392	0.73%	137	0.25%	5,973	11.07%	53,956
Macoupin	12,131	54.27%	9,116	40.78%	901	4.03%	155	0.69%	51	0.23%	3,015	13.49%	22,354
Madison	51,160	51.10%	43,860	43.81%	4,206	4.20%	617	0.62%	281	0.28%	7,300	7.29%	100,124
Marion	10,969	58.73%	6,990	37.42%	567	3.04%	90	0.48%	62	0.33%	3,979	21.31%	18,678
Marshall	4,349	64.80%	1,903	28.36%	336	5.01%	115	1.71%	8	0.12%	2,446	36.44%	6,711
Mason	4,644	60.37%	2,680	34.84%	267	3.47%	95	1.23%	7	0.09%	1,964	25.53%	7,693
Massac	4,284	58.91%	2,821	38.79%	124	1.71%	29	0.40%	14	0.19%	1,463	20.12%	7,272
McDonough	8,995	61.66%	4,093	28.06%	1,230	8.43%	155	1.06%	116	0.80%	4,902	33.60%	14,589
McHenry	40,045	64.95%	14,540	23.58%	5,871	9.52%	884	1.43%	315	0.51%	25,505	41.37%	61,655
McLean	30,096	61.13%	13,587	27.60%	4,961	10.08%	443	0.90%	145	0.29%	16,509	33.53%	49,232
Menard	3,622	65.45%	1,589	28.71%	274	4.95%	38	0.69%	11	0.20%	2,033	36.74%	5,534
Mercer	5,144	56.18%	3,361	36.71%	540	5.90%	100	1.09%	11	0.12%	1,783	19.47%	9,156
Monroe	6,315	63.63%	3,121	31.45%	405	4.08%	55	0.55%	28	0.28%	3,194	32.18%	9,924
Montgomery	8,947	58.04%	5,721	37.11%	611	3.96%	102	0.66%	34	0.22%	3,226	20.93%	15,415
Morgan	10,406	61.22%	5,483	32.26%	900	5.30%	159	0.94%	49	0.29%	4,923	28.96%	16,997
Moultrie	3,495	56.73%	2,332	37.85%	280	4.54%	45	0.73%	9	0.15%	1,163	18.88%	6,161
Ogle	12,533	66.41%	4,067	21.55%	2,042	10.82%	180	0.95%	49	0.26%	8,466	44.86%	18,871
Peoria	47,815	57.26%	28,276	33.86%	6,169	7.39%	1,065	1.28%	185	0.22%	19,539	23.40%	83,510
Perry	5,888	55.49%	4,337	40.88%	319	3.01%	55	0.52%	11	0.10%	1,551	14.61%	10,610
Piatt	4,867	62.25%	2,421	30.97%	447	5.72%	64	0.82%	19	0.24%	2,446	31.28%	7,818
Pike	5,301	56.63%	3,695	39.47%	303	3.24%	53	0.57%	9	0.10%	1,606	17.16%	9,361
Pope	1,501	61.14%	880	35.85%	58	2.36%	10	0.41%	6	0.24%	621	25.29%	2,455
Pulaski	2,083	50.82%	1,955	47.69%	49	1.20%	9	0.22%	3	0.07%	128	3.13%	4,099
Putnam	1,959	57.38%	1,158	33.92%	235	6.88%	51	1.49%	11	0.32%	801	23.46%	3,414
Randolph	8,810	56.86%	6,052	39.06%	514	3.32%	89	0.57%	29	0.19%	2,758	17.80%	15,494
Richland	5,241	64.50%	2,463	30.31%	358	4.41%	57	0.70%	7	0.09%	2,778	34.19%	8,126
Rock Island	34,788	48.47%	30,045	41.86%	5,818	8.11%	618	0.86%	506	0.70%	4,743	6.61%	71,775
Saline	7,157	53.95%	5,683	42.84%	321	2.42%	59	0.44%	45	0.34%	1,474	11.11%	13,265
Sangamon	49,372	57.95%	29,354	34.45%	5,439	6.38%	592	0.69%	443	0.52%	20,018	23.50%	85,200
Schuyler	2,799	62.76%	1,445	32.40%	155	3.48%	57	1.28%	4	0.09%	1,354	30.36%	4,460
Scott	1,990	65.42%	941	30.93%	80	2.63%	24	0.79%	7	0.23%	1,049	34.49%	3,042
Shelby	6,441	59.12%	3,988	36.61%	381	3.50%	74	0.68%	10	0.09%	2,453	22.51%	10,894
St. Clair	46,063	45.76%	50,046	49.71%	3,879	3.85%	447	0.44%	238	0.24%	-3,983	-3.95%	100,673
Stark	2,358	69.76%	806	23.85%	147	4.35%	64	1.89%	5	0.15%	1,552	45.91%	3,380
Stephenson	10,779	52.87%	6,195	30.39%	3,145	15.43%	234	1.15%	35	0.17%	4,584	22.48%	20,388
Tazewell	35,481	62.84%	16,924	29.97%	3,206	5.68%	789	1.40%	62	0.11%	18,557	32.87%	56,462
Union	4,289	50.81%	3,781	44.79%	291	3.45%	53	0.63%	27	0.32%	508	6.02%	8,441
Vermilion	22,579	57.07%	14,498	36.64%	2,110	5.33%	303	0.77%	77	0.19%	8,081	20.43%	39,567
Wabash	3,571	61.18%	1,975	33.84%	230	3.94%	51	0.87%	10	0.17%	1,596	27.34%	5,837
Warren	5,667	62.47%	2,756	30.38%	489	5.39%	93	1.03%	66	0.73%	2,911	32.09%	9,071
Washington	5,354	68.98%	2,158	27.80%	205	2.64%	29	0.37%	16	0.21%	3,196	41.18%	7,762
Wayne	6,013	62.92%	3,258	34.09%	222	2.32%	53	0.55%	11	0.12%	2,755	28.83%	9,557
White	5,279	58.19%	3,463	38.17%	274	3.02%	41	0.45%	15	0.17%	1,816	20.02%	9,072
Whiteside	17,389	66.72%	7,191	27.59%	1,242	4.77%	202	0.78%	40	0.15%	10,198	39.13%	26,064
Will	69,310	57.44%	41,975	34.79%	7,855	6.51%	1,240	1.03%	278	0.23%	27,335	22.65%	120,658
Williamson	14,451	55.10%	10,779	41.10%	793	3.02%	138	0.53%	67	0.26%	3,672	14.00%	26,228
Winnebago	48,825	46.46%	32,384	30.82%	22,596	21.50%	1,089	1.04%	195	0.19%	16,441	15.64%	105,089
Woodford	10,791	70.68%	3,552	23.26%	711	4.66%	191	1.25%	23	0.15%	7,239	47.42%	15,268
Totals	2,358,049	49.65%	1,981,413	41.72%	346,754	7.30%	38,939	0.82%	24,566	0.52%	376,636	7.93%	4,749,721

==== Counties that flipped from Democratic to Republican ====
- Brown
- Calhoun
- Cass
- Christian
- Cumberland
- Fayette
- Franklin
- Gallatin
- Greene
- Hamilton
- Hardin
- Jackson
- Jefferson
- Jersey
- Macon
- Macoupin
- Madison
- Marion
- Mason
- Massac
- Montgomery
- Moultrie
- Perry
- Pike
- Pulaski
- Randolph
- Rock Island
- Saline
- Shelby
- Union
- White
- Williamson

=== Results by congressional district ===
District	Reagan	Carter	Representative
1st	4.8%	93.0%	Bennett Stewart (96th Congress)
1st	4.8%	93.0%	Harold Washington (97th Congress)
2nd	12.3%	85.5%	Morgan F. Murphy (96th Congress)
2nd	12.3%	85.5%	Gus Savage (97th Congress)
3rd	52.3%	41.7%	Marty Russo
4th	57.9%	34.1%	Ed Derwinski
5th	28.5%	67.6%	John G. Fary
6th	52.4%	39.4%	Henry Hyde
7th	16.8%	80.2%	Cardiss Collins
8th	24.1%	71.6%	Dan Rostenkowski
9th	33.5%	55.8%	Sidney R. Yates
10th	52.9%	34.6%	John Porter
11th	45.5%	47.3%	Frank Annunzio
12th	62.8%	25.8%	Phil Crane
13th	61.9%	28.5%	Robert McClory
14th	64.9%	24.5%	John N. Erlenborn
15th	64.6%	26.5%	Tom Corcoran
16th	64.6%	23.0%	John B. Anderson (96th Congress)
16th	64.6%	23.0%	Lynn M. Martin (97th Congress)
17th	58.7%	35.3%	George M. O'Brien
18th	60.6%	32.9%	Robert H. Michel
19th	57.9%	35.6%	Tom Railsback
20th	59.0%	36.2%	Paul Findley
21st	50.8%	39.4%	Ed Madigan
22nd	60.5%	35.5%	Dan Crane
23rd	47.5%	48.4%	Melvin Price
24th	57.1%	39.1%	Paul Simon

== See also ==
- United States presidential elections in Illinois
