= 1984 United States presidential election in Illinois =

- November 6, 1984
- Turnout: 74.48%

Nominee	Ronald Reagan	Walter Mondale
Party	Republican	Democratic
Home state	California	Minnesota
Running mate	George H. W. Bush	Geraldine Ferraro
Electoral vote	24	0
Popular vote	2,707,103	2,086,499
Percentage	56.17%	43.30%

Reagan
40–50%
50–60%
60–70%
70–80%
80–90%
90–100%
Mondale
50–60%
60–70%
70–80%
90–100%
Tie
President before election
Ronald Reagan
Republican
Elected President
Ronald Reagan
Republican

The 1984 United States presidential election in Illinois took place on November 6, 1984. All 50 states and the District of Columbia, were part of the 1984 United States presidential election. State voters chose 24 electors to the Electoral College, which selected the president and vice president of the United States.

Illinois gave its electoral votes to incumbent United States President Ronald Reagan of California, who was running against former Vice President Walter Mondale of Minnesota. Reagan ran for a second time with Vice President George H. W. Bush of Texas, and Mondale ran with Representative Geraldine Ferraro of New York, the first major female candidate for the vice presidency. Reagan, who was born and raised in Illinois, had moved to California as a young man.

As of 2024, this is the last time a Republican presidential candidate won over 1 million votes in Cook County, the state's most populous county and home to Chicago. The presidential election of 1984 was a very partisan election for Illinois, with over 99% of the electorate voting only either for Democratic candidate Mondale or Republican candidate Reagan, though several other parties did appear on the presidential ballot in the State. Nearly every county in Illinois voted in majority for Reagan. One notable exception to this trend was Chicago's highly populated Cook County, which voted in majority for Mondale, albeit with a 2.6% margin, or 51% to 48.4%. Likewise, 1984 marks the last time any presidential candidate won Cook County with a single-digit margin, and the last election that a Republican won over a million votes in that county. Fulton, Henderson, Knox, Mercer, and Putnam Counties would not vote Republican again until 2016, while Calhoun and Madison counties would not do so again until 2012.

Illinois weighed in for this election as 5 percentage points more Democratic than the national average. As of the 2024 presidential election, this is the last election in which Jackson County voted for a Republican presidential candidate. Reagan won the election in Illinois with a decisive 13-point landslide, carrying 96 out of 102 counties. No Republican candidate has received as strong support in the American Great Lakes States, at large, post-Reagan. While Illinois typically voted conservative at the time, the election results in Illinois also reflect a nationwide reconsolidation of base for the Republican Party which took place through the 1980s; Reagan called it the "second American Revolution." This was most evident during the 1984 presidential election. Notably, this is the closest to date that a Republican has come to carrying Cook County, home to Chicago, since Richard Nixon won it in 1972.

One of the electors initially gave his vote for vice president to Ferraro by accident, but fixed the mistake on a second ballot.

== Primaries ==
The primaries and general elections coincided with those for other federal offices (Senate and House), as well as those for state offices.

=== Turnout ===
Turnout in the state-run primary elections (Democratic and Republican) was 37.25% with a total of 2,254,503 votes cast.

Turnout during the general election was 74.48%, with 4,819,088 votes cast.

State-run primaries were held for the Democratic and Republican parties on March 20.

=== Democratic ===
1984 Illinois Democratic presidential primary
- March 20, 1984

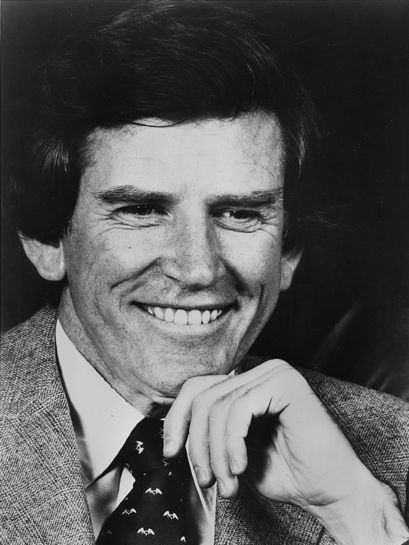

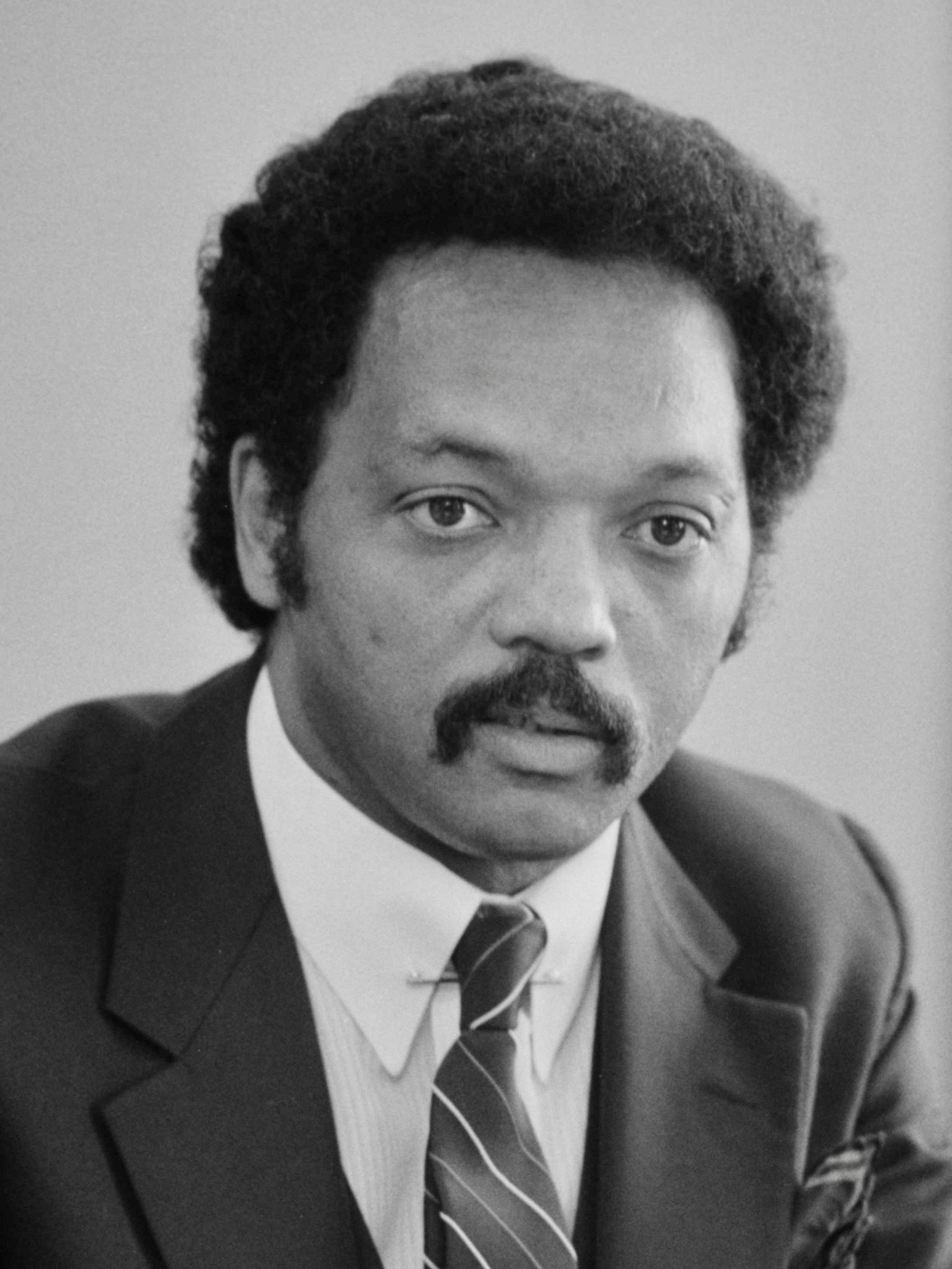
Candidate	Walter Mondale	Gary Hart	Jesse Jackson
Home state	Minnesota	Colorado	Illinois
Popular vote	670,951	584,579	348,843
Percentage	40.43%	35.23%	21.02%

The 1984 Illinois Democratic presidential primary was held on March 20, 1984, in the U.S. state of Illinois as one of the Democratic Party's statewide nomination contests ahead of the 1984 presidential election.

Jackson's voters were 88% black, 10% white, and 1% were members of other groups.

1984 Illinois Democratic presidential primary
Candidate	Votes	%	Delegates
Walter Frederick Mondale	670,951	40.43	
Gary Hart	584,579	35.23	
Jesse L. Jackson	348,843	21.02	
George McGovern withdrew	25,336	1.53	
John Glenn withdrew	19,800	1.19	
Betty Jean Williams	4,797	0.29	
Alan Cranston withdrew	2,786	0.17	
Reubin Askew withdrew	2,182	0.13	
Write-in	151	0.01	
Total	1,659,425	100	

=== Republican ===
1984 Illinois Republican presidential primary
- March 20, 1984
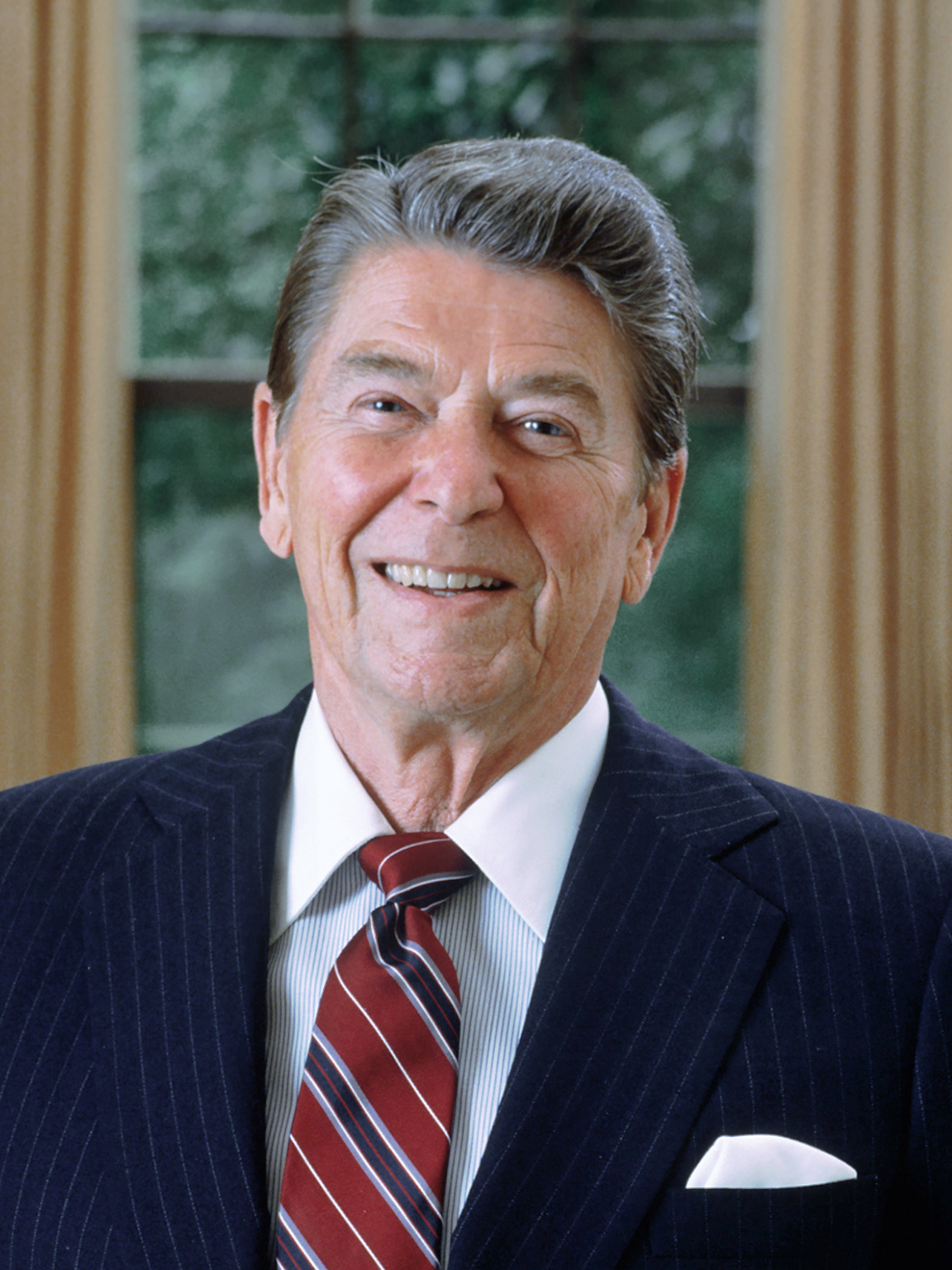
Candidate	Ronald Reagan
Home state	California
Popular vote	594,742
Percentage	99.94%

The 1984 Illinois Republican presidential primary was held on March 20, 1984, in the U.S. state of Illinois as one of the Republican Party's statewide nomination contests ahead of the 1984 presidential election.

1984 Illinois Republican presidential primary
Candidate	Votes	%	Delegates
Ronald Reagan (incumbent)	594,742	99.94	
Write-in	336	0.06	
Total	595,078	100	

== Results ==
1984 United States presidential election in Illinois
Party	Candidate	Votes	Percentage	Electoral votes
Republican	Ronald Reagan (incumbent)	2,707,103	56.17%	24
Democratic	Walter Mondale	2,086,499	43.30%	0
Libertarian	David Bergland	10,086	0.21%	0
Communist Party	Gus Hall	4,672	0.10%	0
Citizen's Party	Sonia Johnson	2,716	0.06%	0
Socialist Equality Party	Edward Winn	2,632	0.05%	0
New Alliance Party	Dennis Serrette	2,386	0.05%	0
Socialist Workers Party	Melvin Mason	2,132	0.04%	0
Write-Ins		862	0.02%	0
Totals		4,819,088	100.0%	24

=== Results by county ===
County	Ronald Reagan Republican		Walter Mondale Democratic		Various candidates Other parties		Margin		Total votes cast
County	#	%	#	%	#	%	#	%	Total votes cast
Adams	20,225	65.99%	10,336	33.72%	88	0.29%	9,889	32.27%	30,649
Alexander	2,574	47.08%	2,872	52.53%	21	0.38%	-298	-5.45%	5,467
Bond	4,240	59.46%	2,870	40.25%	21	0.29%	1,370	19.21%	7,131
Boone	7,536	66.65%	3,717	32.88%	53	0.47%	3,819	33.77%	11,306
Brown	1,478	60.43%	959	39.21%	9	0.37%	519	21.22%	2,446
Bureau	11,741	62.57%	6,925	36.90%	99	0.53%	4,816	25.67%	18,765
Calhoun	1,648	53.04%	1,443	46.44%	16	0.51%	205	6.60%	3,107
Carroll	5,237	68.39%	2,398	31.31%	23	0.30%	2,839	37.08%	7,658
Cass	3,435	53.68%	2,937	45.90%	27	0.42%	498	7.78%	6,399
Champaign	39,224	58.61%	27,266	40.74%	435	0.65%	11,958	17.87%	66,925
Christian	8,534	52.84%	7,541	46.69%	77	0.48%	993	6.15%	16,152
Clark	5,318	63.45%	3,032	36.17%	32	0.38%	2,286	27.28%	8,382
Clay	4,562	64.22%	2,524	35.53%	18	0.25%	2,038	28.69%	7,104
Clinton	9,233	66.43%	4,628	33.30%	38	0.27%	4,605	33.13%	13,899
Coles	14,044	65.95%	7,156	33.60%	95	0.45%	6,888	32.35%	21,295
Cook	1,055,558	48.40%	1,112,641	51.02%	12,536	0.57%	-57,083	-2.62%	2,180,735
Crawford	6,261	66.44%	3,130	33.21%	33	0.35%	3,131	33.23%	9,424
Cumberland	3,002	63.04%	1,733	36.39%	27	0.57%	1,269	26.65%	4,762
DeKalb	20,294	64.50%	10,942	34.78%	229	0.73%	9,352	29.72%	31,465
DeWitt	4,534	65.57%	2,352	34.01%	29	0.42%	2,182	31.56%	6,915
Douglas	5,691	66.14%	2,886	33.54%	27	0.31%	2,805	32.60%	8,604
DuPage	227,141	75.66%	71,430	23.79%	1,644	0.55%	155,711	51.87%	300,215
Edgar	6,821	67.54%	3,241	32.09%	37	0.37%	3,580	35.45%	10,099
Edwards	2,778	72.25%	1,057	27.49%	10	0.26%	1,721	44.76%	3,845
Effingham	9,617	71.22%	3,841	28.44%	46	0.34%	5,776	42.78%	13,504
Fayette	6,607	63.09%	3,844	36.70%	22	0.21%	2,763	26.39%	10,473
Ford	4,871	73.11%	1,763	26.46%	29	0.44%	3,108	46.65%	6,663
Franklin	9,656	47.39%	10,667	52.35%	54	0.27%	-1,011	-4.96%	20,377
Fulton	9,147	49.77%	9,131	49.69%	99	0.54%	16	0.08%	18,377
Gallatin	1,939	47.15%	2,164	52.63%	9	0.22%	-225	-5.48%	4,112
Greene	4,057	60.96%	2,563	38.51%	35	0.53%	1,494	22.45%	6,655
Grundy	9,595	66.98%	4,671	32.61%	59	0.41%	4,924	34.37%	14,325
Hamilton	3,074	57.50%	2,251	42.11%	21	0.39%	823	15.39%	5,346
Hancock	6,251	62.50%	3,713	37.13%	37	0.37%	2,538	25.37%	10,001
Hardin	1,689	58.26%	1,205	41.57%	5	0.17%	484	16.69%	2,899
Henderson	2,289	53.51%	1,969	46.03%	20	0.47%	320	7.48%	4,278
Henry	14,504	57.41%	10,679	42.27%	79	0.31%	3,825	15.14%	25,262
Iroquois	11,327	77.13%	3,300	22.47%	58	0.39%	8,027	54.66%	14,685
Jackson	13,609	52.55%	12,105	46.74%	182	0.70%	1,504	5.81%	25,896
Jasper	3,673	67.35%	1,750	32.09%	31	0.57%	1,923	35.26%	5,454
Jefferson	9,642	57.10%	7,200	42.64%	43	0.25%	2,442	14.46%	16,885
Jersey	5,146	57.60%	3,762	42.11%	26	0.29%	1,384	15.49%	8,934
Jo Daviess	5,877	63.18%	3,348	35.99%	77	0.83%	2,529	27.19%	9,302
Johnson	3,424	67.36%	1,647	32.40%	12	0.24%	1,777	34.96%	5,083
Kane	72,655	69.09%	31,875	30.31%	629	0.60%	40,780	38.78%	105,159
Kankakee	23,807	60.02%	15,246	38.44%	612	1.54%	8,561	21.58%	39,665
Kendall	10,872	73.81%	3,789	25.72%	69	0.47%	7,083	48.09%	14,730
Knox	14,974	55.21%	12,027	44.34%	121	0.45%	2,947	10.87%	27,122
Lake	118,401	68.35%	53,947	31.14%	876	0.51%	64,454	37.21%	173,224
LaSalle	27,388	56.89%	20,532	42.65%	219	0.45%	6,856	14.24%	48,139
Lawrence	4,686	61.35%	2,924	38.28%	28	0.37%	1,762	23.07%	7,638
Lee	11,178	73.76%	3,919	25.86%	58	0.38%	7,259	47.90%	15,155
Livingston	12,291	72.65%	4,567	26.99%	61	0.36%	7,724	45.66%	16,919
Logan	9,932	70.71%	4,052	28.85%	62	0.44%	5,880	41.86%	14,046
Macon	30,457	54.28%	25,463	45.38%	192	0.34%	4,994	8.90%	56,112
Macoupin	12,282	53.51%	10,602	46.19%	69	0.30%	1,680	7.32%	22,953
Madison	57,021	53.94%	48,352	45.74%	340	0.32%	8,669	8.20%	105,713
Marion	11,300	59.65%	7,599	40.11%	46	0.24%	3,701	19.54%	18,945
Marshall	4,060	62.53%	2,386	36.75%	47	0.72%	1,674	25.78%	6,493
Mason	4,109	54.89%	3,354	44.80%	23	0.31%	755	10.09%	7,486
Massac	3,827	54.29%	3,194	45.31%	28	0.40%	633	8.98%	7,049
McDonough	9,383	67.02%	4,561	32.58%	57	0.41%	4,822	34.44%	14,001
McHenry	47,282	76.21%	14,420	23.24%	340	0.55%	32,862	52.97%	62,042
McLean	32,221	66.64%	15,880	32.84%	248	0.51%	16,341	33.80%	48,349
Menard	3,925	68.07%	1,826	31.67%	15	0.26%	2,099	36.40%	5,766
Mercer	4,907	54.97%	3,982	44.61%	38	0.43%	925	10.36%	8,927
Monroe	6,936	67.89%	3,256	31.87%	25	0.24%	3,680	36.02%	10,217
Montgomery	8,191	56.08%	6,360	43.55%	54	0.37%	1,831	12.53%	14,605
Morgan	10,683	66.37%	5,361	33.30%	53	0.33%	5,322	33.07%	16,097
Moultrie	3,593	59.17%	2,458	40.48%	21	0.35%	1,135	18.69%	6,072
Ogle	13,503	73.40%	4,803	26.11%	90	0.49%	8,700	47.29%	18,396
Peoria	45,607	55.02%	36,830	44.43%	462	0.56%	8,777	10.59%	82,899
Perry	5,852	55.88%	4,584	43.77%	36	0.34%	1,268	12.11%	10,472
Piatt	5,000	63.46%	2,840	36.05%	39	0.49%	2,160	27.41%	7,879
Pike	5,295	57.03%	3,965	42.70%	25	0.27%	1,330	14.33%	9,285
Pope	1,545	62.00%	940	37.72%	7	0.28%	605	24.28%	2,492
Pulaski	1,923	52.48%	1,724	47.05%	17	0.46%	199	5.43%	3,664
Putnam	1,912	56.02%	1,487	43.57%	14	0.41%	425	12.45%	3,413
Randolph	9,415	59.48%	6,355	40.15%	59	0.37%	3,060	19.33%	15,829
Richland	5,665	71.95%	2,182	27.71%	27	0.34%	3,483	44.24%	7,874
Rock Island	35,121	46.41%	40,208	53.13%	343	0.45%	-5,087	-6.72%	75,672
Saline	7,176	54.15%	6,038	45.57%	37	0.28%	1,138	8.58%	13,251
Sangamon	54,086	61.10%	34,059	38.47%	378	0.43%	20,027	22.63%	88,523
Schuyler	2,515	61.93%	1,533	37.75%	13	0.32%	982	24.18%	4,061
Scott	1,976	67.33%	943	32.13%	16	0.55%	1,033	35.20%	2,935
Shelby	6,372	59.38%	4,317	40.23%	41	0.38%	2,055	19.15%	10,730
St. Clair	51,046	49.01%	52,294	50.21%	808	0.78%	-1,248	-1.20%	104,148
Stark	2,228	67.15%	1,072	32.31%	18	0.54%	1,156	34.84%	3,318
Stephenson	14,237	67.37%	6,723	31.82%	171	0.81%	7,514	35.55%	21,131
Tazewell	33,782	59.15%	23,095	40.44%	238	0.42%	10,687	18.71%	57,115
Union	4,721	55.13%	3,815	44.55%	28	0.33%	906	10.58%	8,564
Vermilion	22,932	57.89%	16,530	41.73%	149	0.38%	6,402	16.16%	39,611
Wabash	3,639	66.73%	1,795	32.92%	19	0.35%	1,844	33.81%	5,453
Warren	5,846	63.59%	3,318	36.09%	29	0.32%	2,528	27.50%	9,193
Washington	5,129	68.24%	2,363	31.44%	24	0.32%	2,766	36.80%	7,516
Wayne	6,298	70.36%	2,621	29.28%	32	0.36%	3,677	41.08%	8,951
White	5,500	61.23%	3,457	38.48%	26	0.29%	2,043	22.75%	8,983
Whiteside	16,743	59.59%	11,226	39.96%	127	0.45%	5,517	19.63%	28,096
Will	78,684	63.25%	45,193	36.33%	520	0.42%	33,491	26.92%	124,397
Williamson	14,930	56.06%	11,614	43.61%	86	0.32%	3,316	12.45%	26,630
Winnebago	64,203	58.66%	44,629	40.78%	619	0.57%	19,574	17.88%	109,451
Woodford	10,758	70.44%	4,425	28.97%	89	0.58%	6,333	41.47%	15,272
Totals	2,707,103	56.17%	2,086,499	43.30%	25,486	0.53%	620,604	12.87%	4,819,088

==== Counties that flipped from Republican to Democratic ====
- Franklin
- Gallatin
- Rock Island

=== By congressional district ===
Reagan won 18 of 22 congressional districts, 9 of which elected Democrat representatives.

District	Reagan	Mondale	Representative
1st	4.92%	95.08%	Charles Hayes
2nd	16.28%	83.72%	Gus Savage
3rd	65.13%	34.87%	Marty Russo
4th	50.05%	49.95%	George M. O'Brien
5th	58.33%	41.67%	Bill Lipinski
6th	55.68%	44.32%	Henry Hyde
7th	25.10%	74.90%	Cardiss Collins
8th	51.40%	48.60%	Dan Rostenkowski
9th	45.02%	54.98%	Sidney R. Yates
10th	68.55%	31.45%	John Porter
11th	59.31%	40.69%	Frank Annunzio
12th	76.88%	23.12%	Phil Crane
13th	54.13%	45.87%	John N. Erlenborn
13th	54.13%	45.87%	Harris Fawell
14th	69.19%	30.81%	Tom Corcoran
14th	69.19%	30.81%	John E. Grotberg
15th	68.00%	32.00%	Ed Madigan
16th	63.16%	36.84%	Lynn M. Martin
17th	54.31%	45.69%	Lane Evans
18th	61.86%	38.14%	Bob Michel
19th	62.40%	37.60%	Dan Crane
19th	62.40%	37.60%	Terry L. Bruce
20th	58.06%	41.94%	Dick Durbin
21st	53.42%	46.58%	Melvin Price
22nd	55.84%	44.16%	Paul Simon
22nd	55.84%	44.16%	Kenneth J. Gray

== See also ==
- Presidency of Ronald Reagan
- United States presidential elections in Illinois

== Works cited ==
- Ranney, Austin, ed. (1985). The American Elections of 1984. Duke University Press. ISBN 0822302306.
