= John Hallock =

John Hallock may refer to:

- John Hallock Jr., member of the U.S. House of Representatives from New York
- John Hallock (Illinois politician), member of the Illinois House of Representatives
