= Illinois Exempt Veterans' Organizations from Property Taxes Amendment =

Illinois Exempt Veterans' Organizations from Property Taxes Amendment may refer to:

- Illinois Exempt Veterans' Organizations from Property Taxes Amendment (1978)
- Illinois Exempt Veterans' Organizations from Property Taxes Amendment (1984)
- Illinois Exempt Veterans' Organizations from Property Taxes Amendment (1986)
