= Senator Schaffer =

Senator Schaffer may refer to:

- Bob Schaffer (born 1962), Colorado State Senate
- Jack Schaffer (born 1942), Illinois State Senate
- Tim Schaffer (born 1963), Ohio State Senate

== See also ==
- Senator Schaefer (disambiguation)
- Senator Shafer (disambiguation)
- Senator Shaffer (disambiguation)
