= Senator Holmberg =

Senator Holmberg may refer to:

- Joyce Holmberg (1930–2017), Illinois State Senate
- N. J. Holmberg (1878–1951), Minnesota State Senate
- Ray Holmberg (born 1944), North Dakota State Senate
