= Dave Winters =

American politician (born 1952)

Member of the Illinois House of Representatives from the 68th district
- In office 1995 – July 31, 2012
- Preceded by: Michael V. Rotello
- Succeeded by: John Cabello

Personal details
- Born: June 30, 1952 (age 74) Springfield, Illinois
- Party: Republican
- Profession: Farmer

Dave Winters (born June 30, 1952) is a former Illinois State Representative for the 68th district, serving from 1995 to 2012.

== Biography ==
Dave Winters was born on June 30, 1952. He graduated from Dartmouth College with a B.A. in History (High Honors) and the University of Illinois at Urbana-Champaign with an M.S. in Agricultural Economics.

== Political career ==
Winters served in the Illinois House of Representatives from 1995 until his resignation in July 2012, and was Assistant Republican House Leader from 2003 to 2009. His legislative assignments included environmental/energy issues, child support enforcement, and local telecommunication development. During the 2008 Republican Party presidential primaries, Winters served on the Illinois leadership team of the presidential campaign of former New York City Mayor Rudy Giuliani.

Winters resigned effective July 31, 2012. In his letter, he cited his frustration with the lack of progress on pension reform in Illinois. The Republican Representative Committee of the Republican Party of the 68th Representative District appointed John Cabello to fill the vacancy created by Winters' resignation.

- Local organizations:
  - Winnebago County Zoning Board of Appeals, 1993–95
  - Board Member, League of Women Voters
  - Board Member, Rockford/Winnebago County Planning Commission
  - Board Member, Shirland Township Clerk
  - Board Member, Sinnissippi Audubon Society
  - Board Member, Sinnissippi Open Space Committee, Natural Land Institute
  - Board Member, Winnebago County Farm Bureau
- Legislative Committees:
  - Air, Member
  - Committee of the Whole, Member
  - Electric Utility Oversight, Member
  - Environment and Energy, Member
  - Environmental Health, Ranking Minority Member
  - Gaming, Member
  - Labor, Ranking Minority Member
  - Renewable Energy, Member
  - Telecommunications, Member
