= Senator Schaefer =

Senator Schaefer may refer to:

- Daniel Schaefer (1936–2006), Colorado State Senate
- Kurt Schaefer (born 1965), Missouri State Senate
- Michael P. Schaefer (1938–2013), Pennsylvania State Senate
- Nancy Schaefer (1936–2010), Georgia State Senate

== See also ==
- Senator Schaffer (disambiguation)
- Senator Shafer (disambiguation)
- Senator Shaffer (disambiguation)
