= 1990 United States Senate election in Illinois =

- November 6, 1990
- Turnout: 53.90%
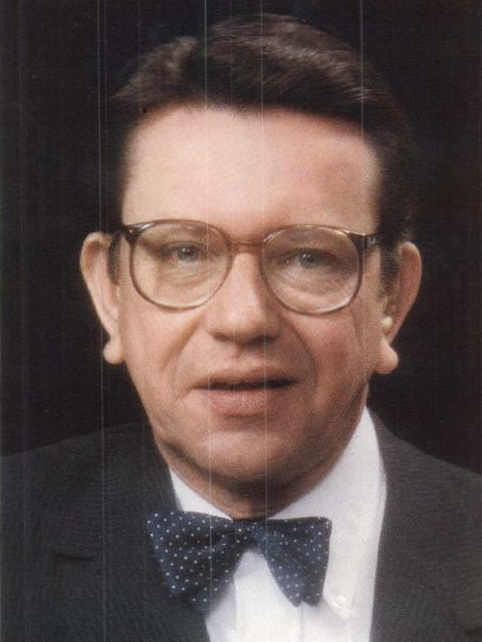

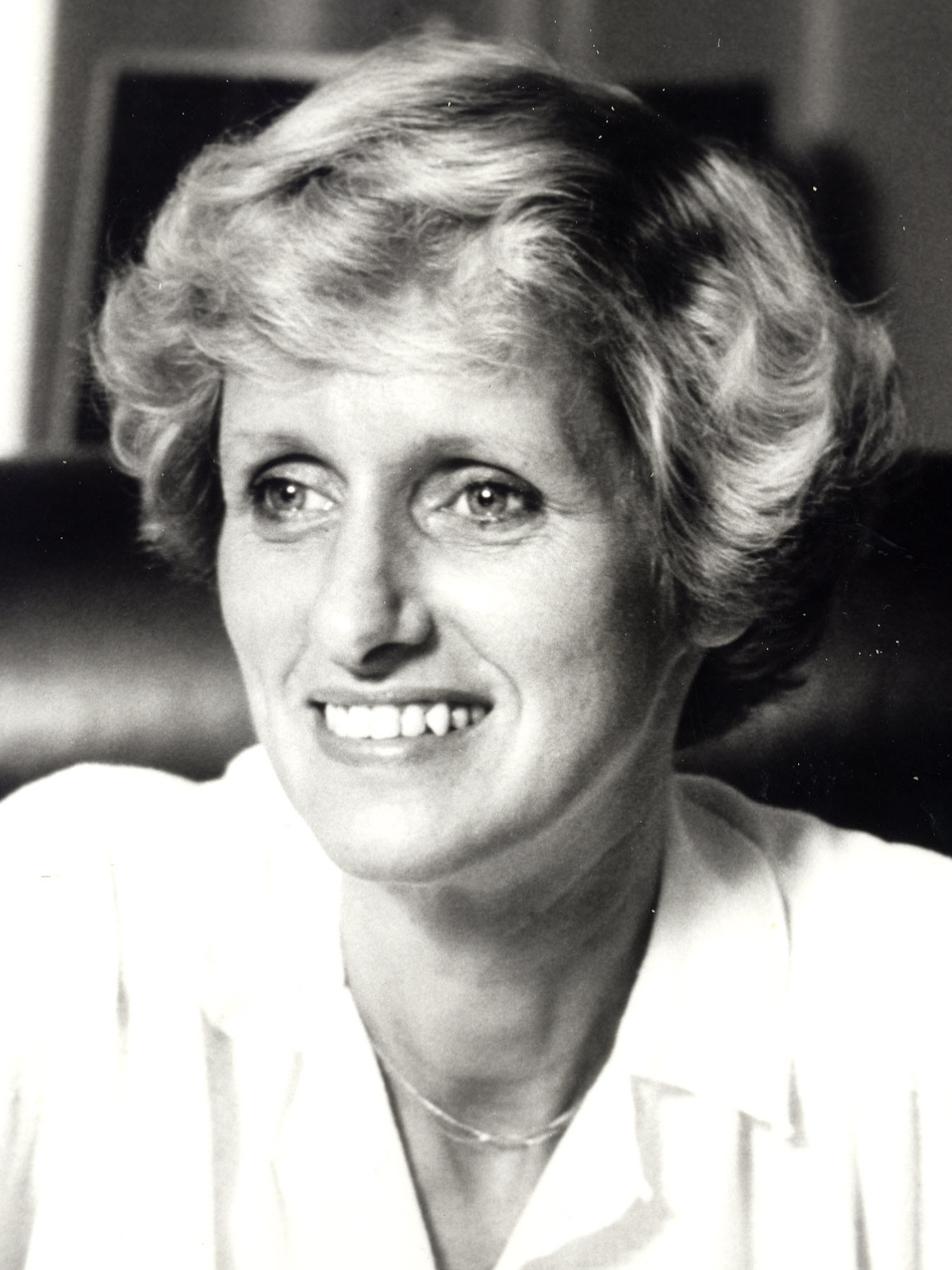
Nominee	Paul Simon	Lynn M. Martin
Party	Democratic	Republican
Popular vote	2,115,377	1,135,628
Percentage	65.07%	34.93%
- Simon: 50–60% 60–70% 70–80% 80–90% >90% Martin: 50–60% 60–70% 70–80% Tie: 50% No data
U.S. senator before election
Paul Simon
Democratic
Elected U.S. Senator
Paul Simon
Democratic

The 1990 United States Senate election in Illinois was held on November 6, 1990. Incumbent Democratic U.S. Senator Paul Simon sought re-election to a second term in office. Simon was opposed by Republican nominee Lynn Morley Martin, a U.S. Congresswoman from Illinois's 16th congressional district, whom he easily defeated to win a second and final term in the Senate. Martin carried only two counties, Edwards and McHenry.

Primaries were held March 20, 1990.

== Background ==
The primaries and general elections coincided with those for House, as well as those for state offices.

For the primaries, turnout was 23.02%, with 1,384,324 votes cast. For the general election, turnout was 53.90%, with 3,251,005 votes cast.

== Democratic primary ==
Democratic primary results
Party	Candidate	Votes	%
Democratic	Paul Simon (incumbent)	811,329	100.00%
Total votes		811,329	100.00%

== Republican primary ==
Republican primary results
Party	Candidate	Votes	%
Republican	Lynn Martin	572,995	100.00%
Total votes		572,995	100.00%

== General election ==
=== Candidates ===
- Paul Simon (D), incumbent United States Senator
- Lynn Morley Martin (R), United States Congresswoman from Illinois's 16th congressional district

=== Election ===
At the start of the election, Martin was considered a formidable challenger, but her campaign floundered – in ads, Martin poked fun at Simon's signature bow tie, but the ad campaign, an attempt at humor, was seen by some as petty and mean-spirited. Martin's campaign suffered from poor fundraising as well, being outspent by Simon by a margin of two-to-one. Simon's popularity proved too much to overcome, and he won with 65 percent of the vote, carrying all but two counties in the state; Edwards County in the southeast and McHenry County outside Chicago, in the heart of the district Martin represented for most of the 1980s. In a midterm favorable to Democrats, Martin was further hurt by negative campaign tactics deployed by advisor Roger Ailes, as well as a number of gaffes. Including, referencing downstate voters as "rednecks". Martin raised the most campaign funds out of any Republican Senate challenger that cycle.

=== Results ===
United States Senate election in Illinois, 1990
Party	Candidate	Votes	%	±%
Democratic	Paul Simon (incumbent)	2,115,377	65.07%	+15.00%
Republican	Lynn Martin	1,135,628	34.93%	−13.28%
Total votes		3,251,005	100.00%	N/A
Democratic hold				

== See also ==
- 1990 United States Senate elections
