= Senator Shafer =

Senator Shafer may refer to:

- David Shafer (politician) (born 1965), Georgia State Senate
- Ira Shafer (1831–1896), New York State Senate
- Raymond P. Shafer (1917–2006), Pennsylvania State Senate

== See also ==
- Senator Schaefer (disambiguation)
- Senator Schaffer (disambiguation)
- Senator Shaffer (disambiguation)
