= John W. Cox Jr. =

American politician and attorney

John Cox
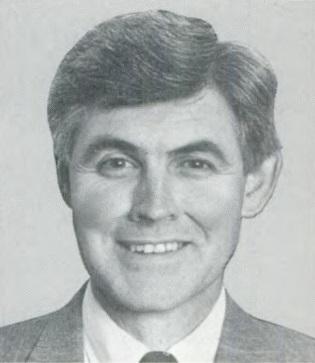

Member of the U.S. House of Representatives from Illinois's 16th district
- In office January 3, 1991 – January 3, 1993
- Preceded by: Lynn Morley Martin
- Succeeded by: Don Manzullo

State Attorney of Jo Daviess County
- In office 1977–1985
- Preceded by: Victor Sprengelmeyer
- Succeeded by: Christopher Moore

Personal details
- Born: John Wayne Cox Jr. July 10, 1947 (age 79) Hazel Green, Wisconsin, U.S.
- Party: Democratic
- Education: University of Wisconsin, Platteville (BS); John Marshall Law School (JD)

John Wayne Cox Jr. (born July 10, 1947) is an American politician and attorney who served a single term as a Democratic member of the United States House of Representatives representing Illinois's 16th congressional district.

== Early life and career ==
Cox was born in Hazel Green, Wisconsin. He attended the nearby University of Wisconsin–Platteville in Platteville, Wisconsin. After graduation, he joined the United States Army where he served from 1969-1970. He then earned his J.D. degree at John Marshall Law School in Chicago. In 1976, Cox defeated Victor Sprengelmeyer, a Republican appointee, for election to serve as State's Attorney for Jo Daviess County, Illinois. During his tenure as State's Attorney, Cox was an advocate for enhanced federal prosecution of human traffickers operating on the Illinois—Iowa border. He served two terms and returned to private practice. He was succeeded by J. Christopher Moore as State's Attorney.

After his terms as State's Attorney, Cox served as a Special Assistant Attorney General with the Illinois Department of Public Aid, an instructor at Loras College, and the City Attorney for Galena, Illinois.

== Congressional term ==
After the retirement of Republican incumbent Lynn Morley Martin, Cox joined the race to succeed her in Congress. Surprisingly, Cox defeated Republican John Hallock, a member of the Illinois House of Representatives from Rockford. During his term, he served on the Banking, Finance and Urban Affairs Committee; Government Operations Committee; Financial Institutions Supervision, Regulation and Insurance Subcommittee; Housing and Community Development Subcommittee; and Government Information, Justice and Agriculture Subcommittee.

During the Republican-led 1991 decennial redistricting, the 16th was pushed into staunchly Republican McHenry County. Donald Manzullo defeated Cox in the newly drawn 16th district. At the time of Cox's loss, fellow Illinois Democrat Dan Rostenkowski was laying the groundwork to get Cox a seat on the United States House Committee on Ways and Means. Manzullo held the seat until his defeat by fellow Republican Congressman Adam Kinzinger for renomination in the 2012 Republican primary election held on March 20, 2012, after the 2011 decennial redistricting.

Cox was the only Democrat to represent a significant portion of Rockford in the 20th century. A Democrat would not represent Rockford until 2011, when the more Democratic portion of the city was drawn into the Quad Cities-based 17th district.

== Post congressional career ==
Following his term, Cox returned to Galena, Illinois where he continued his private law practice. Since returning to Galena, Cox he served as City Attorney for the City of Galena, Illinois. Cox served as Vice President for External Affairs and General Counsel for Jo-Carroll Energy, Inc. (NFP), an Illinois energy cooperative until he retired.

== Notes ==
U.S. House of Representatives
Preceded by Lynn Morley Martin	Member of the U.S. House of Representatives from Illinois's 16th congressional district 1991–1993	Succeeded by Don Manzullo
U.S. order of precedence (ceremonial)
Preceded by Travis Childers as Former U.S. Representative	Order of precedence of the United States as Former U.S. Representative	Succeeded by Mel Reynolds as Former U.S. Representative
