= Michael V. Rotello =

American politician

Mike Rotello

Member of the Illinois House of Representatives from the 69th district 67th district (1991-1993)
- In office January 1991 – January 1995
- Preceded by: John Hallock
- Succeeded by: Dave Winters

Personal details
- Born: October 29, 1952 (age 73) Rockford, Illinois
- Party: Republican (since 1997); Democratic (1975-1997)
- Education: Northern Illinois University (B.A.)

Michael V. Rotello is an American former politician who served as a Democratic member of the Illinois House of Representatives from 1991 to 1995 from the Rockford, Illinois area.

Rotello was born October 29, 1952. While a student at Northern Illinois University, Rotello was elected to the Rockford City Council as a member of the Democratic slate, defeating Stanley St. John. While on the council, he proposed the abolition of city stickers. In 1982, Rotello was elected Winnebago County Auditor. He was reelected in 1986.

In 1990, Rotello defeated Republican and former Winnebago County Chairman John Terranova for the open seat left vacant by John Hallock's bid for Congress in Illinois's 16th congressional district. During his first term, his legislative committee assignments were: Aging; Constitutional Officers; Economic and Urban Development; Financial Institutions; Health Care; Public Safety and Infrastructure Appropriations. The 1991 decennial redistricting process moved Rotello to the 69th district. During his second term he was the Vice Chair of the Committee on Aging. His other committee assignments were: Elections & State Government; Environment & Energy; Financial Institutions. In 1994, he was defeated for reelection by Dave Winters. He went on to work for the Illinois Department of Human Services and the Illinois Department of Commerce.

In 1996, he was an unsuccessful candidate for Winnebago County Chairman. The next year, Rotello switched from the Democratic Party to the Republican Party. He served as a delegate for the presidential campaign of Arizona Senator John McCain.
