= Senator Shaffer =

Senator Shaffer may refer to:

- Brandon Shaffer (born 1971), Colorado State Senate
- Harry G. Shaffer (politician) (1885–1971), West Virginia State Senate
- Tim Shaffer (born 1945), Pennsylvania State Senate

== See also ==
- Senator Schaefer (disambiguation)
- Senator Schaffer (disambiguation)
- Senator Shafer (disambiguation)
