= Cutback Amendment =

Amendment to the Illinois Constitution

The Cutback Amendment (formally named the "Size of State House of Representatives Amendment"; and also known as both "Amendment 1" and the "Legislative Article") is an amendment to the Illinois Constitution that abolished multi-member districts in the Illinois House of Representatives and the process of cumulative voting on November 4, 1980 election. Before the amendment, the Illinois General Assembly was divided into 59 legislative districts, each of which elected one senator and three representatives. In state house elections, voters could vote three times for one candidate or spread their votes between two or three candidates. When the Cutback Amendment was approved in 1980, the total number of House representatives was reduced from 177 to 118 and members were elected from single-member districts formed by dividing the 59 Senate districts in half. The movement to pass the bill was largely led by Pat Quinn, the Coalition for Political Honesty, the League of Women Voters, and Citizens for Constitutional Reform.

The amendment was passed via a referendum and popularly seen as a way to punish the legislature for voting to give itself a 40% raise. It amended Article IV, Sections 1, 2 and 3 of the Constitution of Illinois.

== Passage ==
Voters approved the measure by referendum on November 4, 1980. In order to be approved, the measure required either 60% support among those specifically voting on the measure or 50% support among all ballots cast in the 1980 Illinois elections. Ultimately, the threshold of 60% among those voting on the measure was met. Alongside the Sale of Tax Delinquent Property Amendment, it became one of the first two amendments adopted following the 1970 passage of the revised Constitution of Illinois.

Illinois Size of State House of Representatives Amendment
Option	Votes	% of votes on measure	% of all ballots cast
Yes	2,112,224	68.70	43.38
No	962,325	31.30	19.77
Total votes	3,074,549	100	63.15

Cutback Amendment results by county Yes: 80–90%; 70–80%; 60–70%; 50–60%; No: 60–70%; 50–60%

== Calls for repeal ==
Since the adoption of the Cutback Amendment, there have been proposals by some major political figures in Illinois to bring back multi-member districts. A task force led by former governor Jim Edgar and former federal judge Abner Mikva issued a report in 2001 calling for the revival of cumulative voting, in part because it appears that such a system increases the representation of racial minorities in elected office. The Chicago Tribune editorialized in 1995 that the multi-member districts elected with cumulative voting produced better legislators. Others have argued that the now-abandoned system provided for greater "stability" in the lower house.
