= John Hallock (Illinois politician) =

American lawyer (born 1946)

John Wallace Hallock, Jr. is an American politician. He served as a Republican member of the Illinois House of Representatives.

== Early life and career ==
John Wallace Hallock, Jr. was born July 9, 1946 in Rockford, Illinois. A fifth generation Rockford native, he attended Rockford Guilford High School. He earned a B.A. in political science at Loyola University Chicago and his J.D. at Chicago-Kent College of Law. He was a legal intern in office of the United States Attorney for the Northern District of Illinois and as a law clerk to the Attorney General of Illinois. He spent several years as a teacher and practiced law in private practice.

== Illinois House ==
He was elected to the Illinois House of Representatives in the 1978 general election. In his first term he served on Appropriations II, State Government Organization, Counties and Townships Committees and Economic and Fiscal Commission. He was appointed Minority Whip for the 83rd General Assembly. In 1990, Winnebago County Auditor and Democratic candidate Michael Rotello defeated former Winnebago County board chairman and Republican candidate John Terranova to succeed Hallock.

== Post-legislative life ==
In 1990, in a surprise outcome, Democratic candidate John W. Cox Jr. defeated Hallock to succeed Lynn Morley Martin as the Congressperson from Illinois's 16th congressional district. Governor Jim Edgar appointed Hallock to the Illinois Industrial Commission, which administered the workers compensation system.

Illinois House of Representatives
Preceded by Lynn M. Martin	Member of the Illinois House of Representatives from the 34th district 1979–1983; Served alongside: W. Timothy Simms, Edolo J. Giorgi, James Kelley	Succeeded by William Shaw
Preceded by District created	Member of the Illinois House of Representatives from the 67th district 1983–1991	Succeeded by Michael V. Rotello
