= W. Timothy Simms =

American politician from Illinois (born 1943)

Member of the Illinois Senate from the 34th district
- In office December 1980 – January 1983
- Preceded by: Lynn Morley Martin
- Succeeded by: Joyce Holmberg

Member of the Illinois House of Representatives from the 34th district
- In office January 1971 – December 1980
- Preceded by: David Johnson
- Succeeded by: James Kelley

Personal details
- Born: April 9, 1943 (age 83) Morrison, Illinois
- Party: Republican
- Spouse: Jane
- Children: Five
- Education: Parsons College; Worsham College
- Profession: Funeral Director

W. Timothy Simms (born April 9, 1943) is a former Republican member of the Illinois General Assembly, representing the 34th District from 1971 to 1983.

== Career ==
Simms was born April 9, 1943, in Morrison, Illinois. He was educated at Parsons College in Fairfield, Iowa, and the Worsham College of Mortuary Science. At age 23, he was elected to the City Council in Rockford, Illinois. From 1966 to 1976, Simms' served as both a precinct committeeman and alderman for the second ward of Rockford, Illinois.

In 1970, Simms was elected to represent the 34th District in the Illinois House of Representatives. During his first term in office, Simms sponsored the United States' first prescription drug labeling law, and was assigned to the General Assembly's Legislative Investigative Commission, where he served until 1983.

Owing to his early success in both politics and business, Simms was selected as 1 of 20 Outstanding Young Men of America in 1970 by the United States Junior Chamber of Commerce.

After being elected to serve a sixth term in the House of Representatives, one of which saw him serve as House Minority Whip, Simms was appointed by the 34th District Republican Legislative Committee to fill the vacancy left when Lynn Morley Martin was elected to the United States House of Representatives from Illinois's 16th congressional district. The committee then chose James Kelley to the Illinois House of Representatives to replace Simms. In the 1982 general election, Simms lost to Joyce Holmberg.

Following his career in the Illinois General Assembly, Simms became a two-time delegate for Ronald Reagan, and served as president of the Illinois Funeral Directors Association.
