= Joyce Holmberg =

American politician and educator (1930–2017)

Member of the Illinois Senate from the 34th district
- In office 1983–1993

Personal details
- Born: Joyce Lundeen; June 19, 1930 Rockford, Illinois, U.S.
- Died: March 20, 2017 (aged 86) Rockford, Illinois, U.S.
- Party: Democratic
- Spouse: Eugene Holmberg
- Education: Northern Illinois University; Adler University; Rockford University
- Profession: Politician, educator

Joyce Mina Lundeen Holmberg (née Lundeen; June 19, 1930 – March 20, 2017) was an American politician and educator.

Born in Rockford, Illinois, Holmberg graduated from East High School in Rockford and was married to Eugene Holmberg. She received her bachelor's degree in education from Northern Illinois University and her master's degree in counseling psychology from Adler School of Professional Psychology. She also did graduate work at Rockford University. Holmberg worked as a teacher in the Rockford Public Schools and was an instructor at Rock Valley College. In the 1982 general election, Holmberg defeated Republican incumbent W. Timothy Simms to represent the 34th legislative district. From 1983 to 1993, Holmberg served in the Illinois Senate and was a Democrat. Dave Syverson, a Republican, defeated Holmberg in the 1992 general election. Holmberg died at Fairhaven Christian Retirement Center in Rockford, Illinois.
