= Jack Schaffer =

American politician and businessman (born 1942)

Jack Schaffer (born October 12, 1942) is an American politician and businessman.

Born in Chicago, Illinois, Schaffer served in the United States Army. He received his bachelor's degree from Northern Illinois University. He owned an outdoor advertising business and a self-storage business in Crystal Lake, Illinois.

Schaffer was county auditor for McHenry County, Illinois from 1968 to 1972. From 1973 to 1999, he served in the Illinois State Senate as a Republican. As state senator, Schaffer served as caucus chairman, minority whip and minority leader. In 1992, Schaffer ran for Congress in Illinois's 16th congressional district, against Don Manzullo. He was defeated in the Republican primary by Manzullo 56%-44%, who would later go on to win the general election.

From 1999 to 2003, Schaffer then served as a consultant and lobbyist and was Commissioner of the Illinois Office of Banks and Real Estate. In 2006, Schaffer was appointed to the Metra Board, and in 2009, he was elected treasurer.
