= 1980 Illinois elections =

- November 4, 1980
- Turnout: 78.15%

Elections were held in Illinois on Tuesday, November 4, 1980.

Primaries were held on March 18.

== Election information ==
=== Turnout ===
Turnout in the primary election was 43.50%, with a total of 2,493,518 ballots cast. 1,321,810 Democratic and 1,171,708 Republican primary ballots were cast.

Turnout during the general election was 78.14%, with 4,868,623 ballots cast.

== Federal elections ==
=== United States President ===
Illinois voted for Republican ticket of Ronald Reagan and George H. W. Bush.

This was the fourth consecutive election in which the state had voted for the Republican ticket in a presidential election.

=== United States Senate ===
Incumbent Democrat Adlai Stevenson III, did not seek reelection. Democrat Alan J. Dixon was elected to succeed him.

=== United States House ===
In a January 22, 1980 special election for Illinois's 10th congressional district, Republican John Porter captured what had previously been a Democratic-held seat.

All of Illinois' 24 congressional seats were up for reelection in November 1980.

In the November election, none of Illinois' seats switched parties, with there remaining 14 Republican and seats 10 Democratic seats in Illinois' House of Representatives delegation.

== State elections ==
=== State Senate ===
Some seats of the Illinois Senate were up for election in 1980. Democrats retained control of the chamber.

=== State House of Representatives ===
All of the seats in the Illinois House of Representatives were up for election in 1980. Republicans flipped control of the chamber.

=== Trustees of University of Illinois ===
1980 Trustees of University of Illinois election
- November 4, 1980

An election was held for three of nine seats for Trustees of University of Illinois system.

The election saw the reelection first-term incumbent Democratic Nina T. Shepherd and the election of new members, Republicans Galey S. Day and Dean E. Madden.

First-term incumbent Democrats Arthur R. Velasquez and Robert J. Lenz lost reelection.

Trustees of the University of Illinois election
Party	Candidate	Votes	%
Republican	Dean S. Madden	2,009,945	16.88
Democratic	Nina T. Shepherd (incumbent)	1,995,637	16.76
Republican	Mrs. Galey S. Day	1,914,231	16.07
Democratic	Robert J. Lenz (incumbent)	1,840,099	15.45
Republican	Lawrence W. Gougler	1,786,141	15.00
Democratic	Arthur R. Velasquez (incumbent)	1,761,259	14.79
Citizens	Denise B. Rose	77,123	0.65
Libertarian	William R. Mitchell	63,282	0.53
Libertarian	Richard Rasmussen	61,249	0.51
Libertarian	James D. McCawley	58,994	0.50
Citizens	John Rossen	56,068	0.47
Communist	Barbara A. Browne	46,956	0.39
Citizens	Andy Korsage-Norman	41,808	0.35
Socialist Workers	Donald J. Hanrahan	31,774	0.27
Socialist Workers	Susan E. Browne	29,639	0.25
Workers World	Jill H. Hill	27,704	0.23
Workers World	Sharon K. Sindelar	26,017	0.22
Communist	Mark J. Almberg	22,793	0.19
Communist	Richard W. Rozoff	22,406	0.19
Socialist Workers	David W. Tucker	18,551	0.16
Workers World	Willie James Hill	18,029	0.15
Write-in	Others	47	0.00
Total votes		11,909,752	100

=== Judicial elections ===
Multiple judicial positions were up for election in 1980.

=== Ballot measures ===
Illinois voters voted on a two ballot measures in 1980. In order to be approved, the measures required either 60% support among those specifically voting on the measure or 50% support among all ballots cast in the elections.

The two measures were approved, becoming the first amendments to be successfully made following the passage of the 1970 Constitution of Illinois.

==== Size of State House of Representatives Amendment ====
Voters approved the Size of State House of Representatives Amendment (also known as "Amendment 1", the "Legislative Article", and the "Cutback Amendment"), which was an initiated constitutional amendment that amended Article IV, Sections 1, 2 and 3 of the Constitution of Illinois to reduce the size of the Illinois House of Representatives from 177 to 118 members, eliminated cumulative voting, and replace the use of multi-member districts with single-member districts.

Size of State House of Representatives Amendment
Option	Votes	% of votes on referendum	% of all ballots cast
Yes	2,112,224	68.70	43.38
No	962,325	31.30	19.77
Total votes	3,074,549	100	63.15
Voter turnout	49.35%		

Cutback Amendment results by county Yes: 80–90%; 70–80%; 60–70%; 50–60%; No: 60–70%; 50–60%

==== Sale of Tax Delinquent Property Amendment ====
Voters approved the Sale of Tax Delinquent Property Amendment (also known as the "Revenue Article" and "Article 2"), which was a legislatively referred constitutional amendment that amended Article IX, Section 8 of the Constitution of Illinois to reduce the redemption period on the sale of tax delinquent property.

Sale of Tax Delinquent Property Amendment
Option	Votes	% of votes on referendum	% of all ballots cast
Yes	1,857,985	69.94	38.16
No	798,422	30.06	16.40
Total votes	2,656,407	100	54.56
Voter turnout	42.64%		

Amendment results by county Yes: 70–80%; 60–70%; 50–60%; No: 50–60%

== Local elections ==
Local elections were held.
