= Lynn M. Martin =

American politician (born 1939)

Lynn Martin
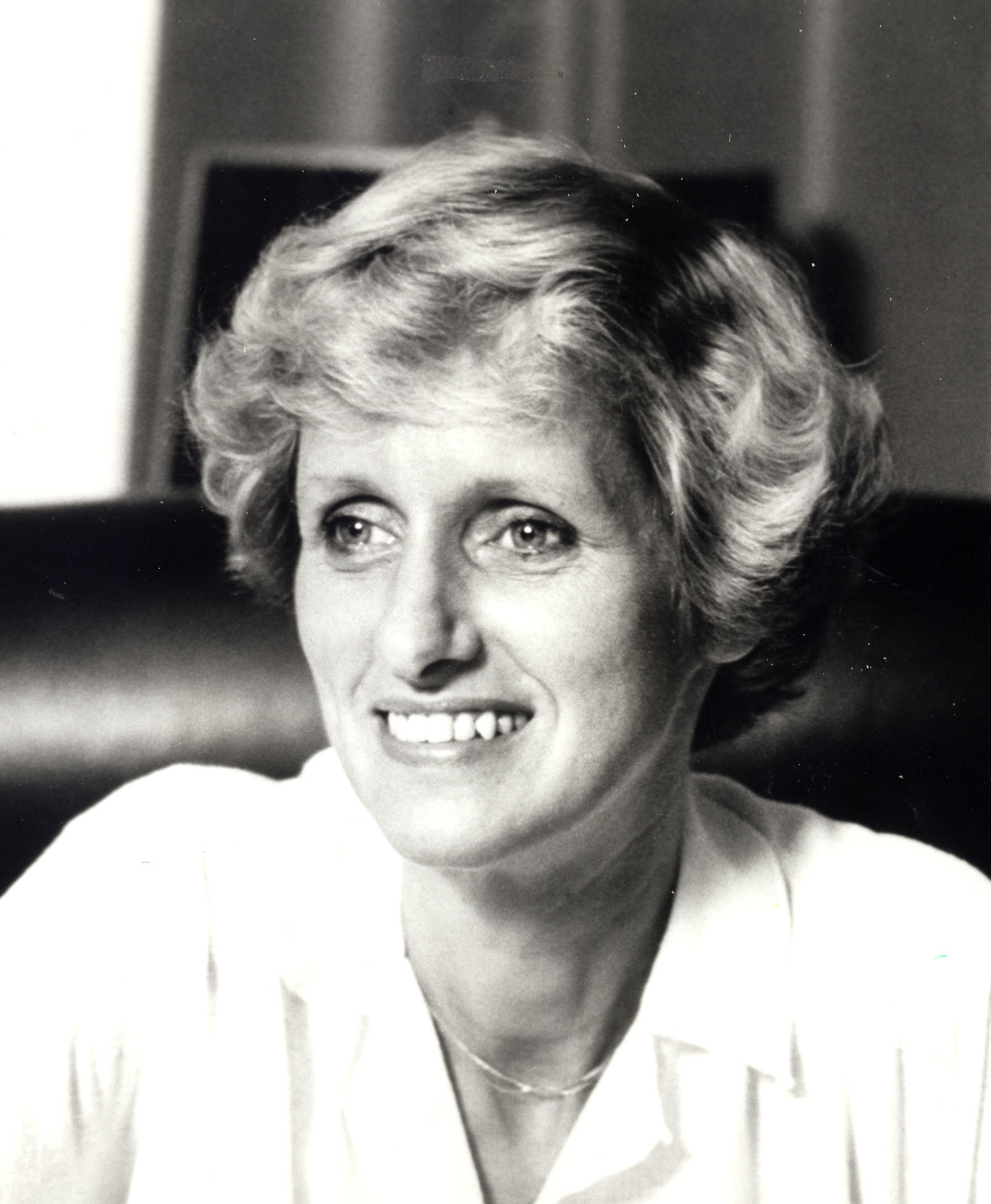

21st United States Secretary of Labor
- In office February 7, 1991 – January 20, 1993
- President: George H. W. Bush
- Deputy: Delbert Spurlock
- Preceded by: Elizabeth Dole
- Succeeded by: Robert Reich

Vice Chair of the House Republican Conference
- In office January 3, 1985 – January 3, 1989
- Leader: Robert H. Michel
- Preceded by: Jack Edwards
- Succeeded by: Bill McCollum

Member of the U.S. House of Representatives from Illinois's 16th district
- In office January 3, 1981 – January 3, 1991
- Preceded by: John B. Anderson
- Succeeded by: John W. Cox Jr.

Member of the Illinois Senate from the 34th district
- In office January 1979 – January 1981
- Preceded by: Vivian Hickey
- Succeeded by: W. Timothy Simms

Member of the Illinois House of Representatives from the 34th district
- In office January 1977 – January 1979 Serving with Edolo J. Giorgi; W. Timothy Simms
- Preceded by: Guy Stubblefield
- Succeeded by: John Hallock

Personal details
- Born: Judith Lynn Morley; December 26, 1939 (age 86) Evanston, Illinois, U.S.
- Party: Republican
- Spouses: John Martin (m. 1960; div. 1978); Harry Leinenweber (m. 1987; died 2024)
- Children: 2
- Education: University of Illinois, Urbana-Champaign (BA)

Lynn Morley Martin (born Judith Lynn Morley; December 26, 1939) is an American businesswoman and former politician who served as the 21st United States secretary of labor from 1991 to 1993, under President George H. W. Bush. A member of the Republican Party, she previously represented Illinois's 16th congressional district in the United States House of Representatives from 1981 to 1991. Before her election to Congress, Martin served in both chambers of Illinois General Assembly; in the State House of Representatives from 1977 to 1979, as well as the State Senate from 1979 to 1980 .

== Early life and career ==
Martin was born in Evanston, Illinois, the daughter of Helen Catherine (Hall) and Lawrence William Morley, an accountant. She attended Taft High School in Chicago from 1952 to 1956. She was later named to Taft's Hall of Fame. In 1960 she graduated from the University of Illinois, where she was a member of the Gamma Phi Beta sorority. After becoming a teacher in the Rockford Public School District, she continued in that job after being elected to public office, serving as a member of the Winnebago County board from 1972 to 1976 before being elected to the Illinois House of Representatives (1977–1979), Illinois Senate (1979–1980), and U.S. House of Representatives (1981–1991).

== U.S. House of Representatives ==
She ran for the House, after Representative John B. Anderson retired to run for president in 1980. She won a competitive four-way Republican primary for the open seat. Martin ran on a platform that was fiscally conservative, lower taxes and business deregulation, and socially liberal, pro-choice and advocating for the Equal Rights Amendment.

In the U.S. House, she was vice chair of the House Republican Conference. She was the first woman to be elected to a position in the Republican House Leadership. During her time in Congress, Martin served on the Armed Services Committee, the Budget Committee, and the House Rules Committee. Martin earned the nickname "the Axe" for her efforts to reduce spending while serving on the House Budget Committee. On a number of important issues she split with Republicans: arguing for a minimum wage increase, voting to override President Reagan's 1986 veto of a sanctions bill against the apartheid regime in South Africa, joining with Democrats to stiffen punishment for white-collar criminals, and supporting pro-choice legislation.

A loyalist to the Reagan Administration, she assisted then-Vice President George H. W. Bush with his preparation for the 1984 vice presidential debate against Geraldine Ferraro. She brought an unexpected attacking and aggressive style out of the gates in the mock debates, throwing the Vice President off balance and convincing him that he needed to take Ferraro more seriously and prepare more. Martin also was tapped to deliver Bush's nominating speech at the Republican National Convention in Dallas. Bush touted her as a possible running mate in his 1988 presidential campaign, though he eventually selected Indiana Senator Dan Quayle.

Martin entered the race for the vacant Republican Conference Chair position, following Dick Cheney of Wyoming's decision to run for Whip spot, the second highest leadership position. Martin lost her bid to Jerry Lewis of California by a slim margin of three votes after conservative hardliners mounted a coordinated campaign against her, in part, for her stances on social issues.

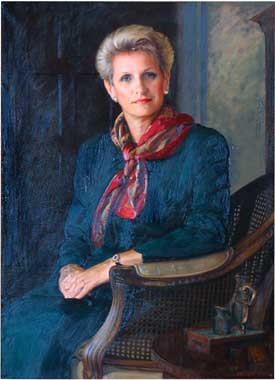
Martin's official U.S. Department of Labor portrait, by artist Peter Egeli

== 1990 Senate election ==
Martin ran for the U.S. Senate in 1990 against Democratic incumbent Paul Simon. She was considered a formidable challenger, but her campaign floundered – in ads, Martin poked fun at Simon's signature bow tie, but the humorous ad campaign was seen by some as petty and mean-spirited. Martin's campaign suffered from poor fundraising as well, being outspent by Simon by a margin of two-to-one. Simon's popularity proved too much to overcome, and he won with 65 percent of the vote, carrying all but two counties in the state; Edwards County in the southeast and McHenry County outside Chicago, in the heart of the district Martin represented for most of the 1980s. In a midterm favorable to Democrats, Martin was further hurt by negative campaign tactics deployed by advisor Roger Ailes, as well as a number of gaffes. Including, referencing downstate voters as "rednecks". Martin raised the most campaign funds out of any Republican Senate challenger that cycle.

== Secretary of Labor ==
Martin was tapped to be Secretary of Labor in the George H. W. Bush administration when Elizabeth Dole resigned to become president of the American Red Cross. Martin was confirmed as Secretary of Labor by the Senate on January 22, 1991, by a vote of 94–0. During her tenure, Martin promoted programs that would help produce a highly skilled workforce. Martin's signature policy while Secretary was the promotion of her Glass Ceiling Commission. Martin pushed for greater representation of women and minorities in the corporate world and was crusader against sexual harassment in the work place.

At the 1992 Republican National Convention, Secretary Martin was selected to give the nominating address for president to George H. W. Bush.

== Post political career ==
From 1993 to 1999, Martin was a professor at the Kellogg School of Management at Northwestern University, and chair of the Council for the Advancement of Women and advisor to the firm of Deloitte & Touche LLP, for Deloitte's internal human resources and minority advancement matters. She was briefly a fellow at Harvard University's Kennedy School of Government.

In 1993, Martin was among the finalist to be named as Commissioner of Baseball, but the job ultimately went to Bud Selig.

In 1995, she tested the waters to run for the 1996 Republican presidential nomination, but decided against it after concluding there was insufficient support for her candidacy. She participated in a Republican primary debate in New Hampshire on local television. Arguably, she would have been the most viable woman to run for the Republican presidential nomination in history to that date.

Martin has been a director on the boards of AT&T Corporation, Ryder System Inc., Dreyfus Funds, Constellation Energy Group and Procter & Gamble. She served as chairman of the board of the Lincoln Park Zoo in Chicago.

She is briefly mentioned in The Loudest Voice for her connection to future Fox News executive Roger Ailes.

== Personal life ==
She married John Martin in 1960 and the couple had two daughters. They divorced in 1978. Martin remarried in 1987 to Harry Leinenweber, a U.S. District Court Judge, who died in 2024. She has five stepchildren.

== Awards ==
Lynn Morley Martin was inducted as a laureate of The Lincoln Academy of Illinois and awarded the Order of Lincoln (the State's highest honor) by Illinois Governor George Ryan in 2000 in the area of government.

== Electoral History ==
=== Illinois Senate, 34th District ===
1978 Illinois elections
Party	Candidate	Votes	%
Republican	Lynn M. Martin	24,598	53.76
Democratic	Frank M. Parrino	21,161	46.24
Total votes		45,759	100.0

== See also ==
- List of female United States Cabinet members
- Women in the United States House of Representatives

U.S. House of Representatives
Preceded by John Anderson	Member of the U.S. House of Representatives from Illinois's 16th congressional district 1981–1991	Succeeded by John Cox
Party political offices
Preceded by Jack Edwards	Vice Chair of the House Republican Conference; 1985–1989	Succeeded by Bill McCollum
Preceded by Charles H. Percy	Republican nominee for U.S. Senator from Illinois (Class 2); 1990	Succeeded by Al Salvi
Political offices
Preceded by Elizabeth Dole	United States Secretary of Labor; 1991–1993	Succeeded by Robert Reich
U.S. order of precedence (ceremonial)
Preceded by Louis Wade Sullivan as Former U.S. Cabinet Member	Order of precedence of the United States as Former U.S. Cabinet Member	Succeeded by Lamar Alexander as Former U.S. Cabinet Member
