= 1984 Illinois elections =

- November 6, 1984
- Turnout: 76.80%

Elections were held in Illinois on Tuesday, November 6, 1984.

Primaries were held on March 20.

== Election information ==
=== Turnout ===
Turnout in the primary election was 40.89% with a total of 2,474,610 ballots cast. 1,771,948 Democratic, 702,421 Republican, and 241 Citizens primary ballots were cast.

Turnout during the general election was 76.80%, with 4,969,330 ballots cast.

== Federal elections ==
=== United States President ===
Illinois voted for Republican ticket of Ronald Reagan and George H. W. Bush.

This was the fifth consecutive election in which the state had voted for the Republican ticket in a presidential election.

=== United States Senate ===
Incumbent Republican Charles H. Percy, who was seeking a fifth term as senator, was unseated by Democrat Paul Simon.

=== United States House ===
All of Illinois' 22 congressional seats were up for reelection in 1984.

== State elections ==
=== State Senate ===
Some of the seats of the Illinois Senate were up for election in 1984. Democrats retained control of the chamber.

=== State House of Representatives ===
All of the seats in the Illinois House of Representatives were up for election in 1984. Democrats retained control of the chamber.

=== Trustees of University of Illinois ===
1984 Trustees of University of Illinois election
- November 6, 1984

An election was held for three of nine seats for Trustees of University of Illinois system.

The election saw the reelection incumbent Republican Ralph Crane Hahn to a fourth term, as well as the election of new trustees Republican Susan Loving Gravenhorst and Democrat Ann E. Smith.

First-term incumbent Democrat Paul Stone lost reelection. First-term incumbent Democrat Edmund Donoghue was not nominated for reelection.

Trustees of the University of Illinois election
Party	Candidate	Votes	%
Democratic	Anne E. Smith	2,070,202	16.23
Republican	Ralph Crane Hahn (incumbent)	2,052,029	16.09
Republican	Susan Loving Gravenhorst	2,044,566	16.03
Republican	Park Livingston	2,011,310	15.77
Democratic	Paul Stone (incumbent)	1,995,185	15.65
Democratic	Robert C. Hamilton	1,946,845	15.27
Citizens	Edward A. Sadlowski	106,795	0.84
Citizens	Mary Lee Sargent	94,246	0.74
Libertarian	Cheryl Person-Tillman	57,552	0.45
Communist	Marcia D. Davis	56,289	0.44
Communist	Richard L. Giovanoni	50,724	0.40
Libertarian	Carol Healy Wrne	49,124	0.39
Libertarian	Joseph A. Maxwell	47,640	0.37
Citizens	Marian Henriquez Neudel	41,954	0.33
Communist	Elsie Rosado	37,311	0.29
Socialist Workers	Rita Lee	36,384	0.29
Socialist Workers	Mark Burrows	27,918	0.22
Socialist Workers	Holly Harkness	26,782	0.21
Write-in	Others	22	0.00
Total votes		12,752,878	100

=== Judicial elections ===
Multiple judicial positions were up for election in 1984.

=== Ballot measure ===
Illinois voters voted on a single ballot measure in 1984. In order to be approved, the measure required either 60% support among those specifically voting on the amendment or 50% support among all ballots cast in the elections.

==== Exempt Veterans' Organizations from Property Taxes Amendment ====
Exempt Veterans' Organizations from Property Taxes Amendment, a legislatively referred constitutional amendment which would amend Article IX, Section 6 of the Constitution of Illinois to exempt property used exclusively by veterans' organizations from property taxes, failed to meet either threshold to amend the constitution.

Exempt Veterans' Organizations from Property Taxes Amendment
Option	Votes	% of votes on measure	% of all ballots cast
Yes	1,147,864	52.41	23.10
No	1,042,481	47.59	20.98
Total votes	2,190,345	100	44.08
Voter turnout	33.85%		

Amendment results by county Yes: 60–70%; 50–60%; No: 50–60%

== Local elections ==
Local elections were held.
