= 1984 United States House of Representatives elections =

House elections for the 99th U.S. Congress

- November 6, 1984

All 435 seats in the United States House of Representatives 218 seats needed for a majority
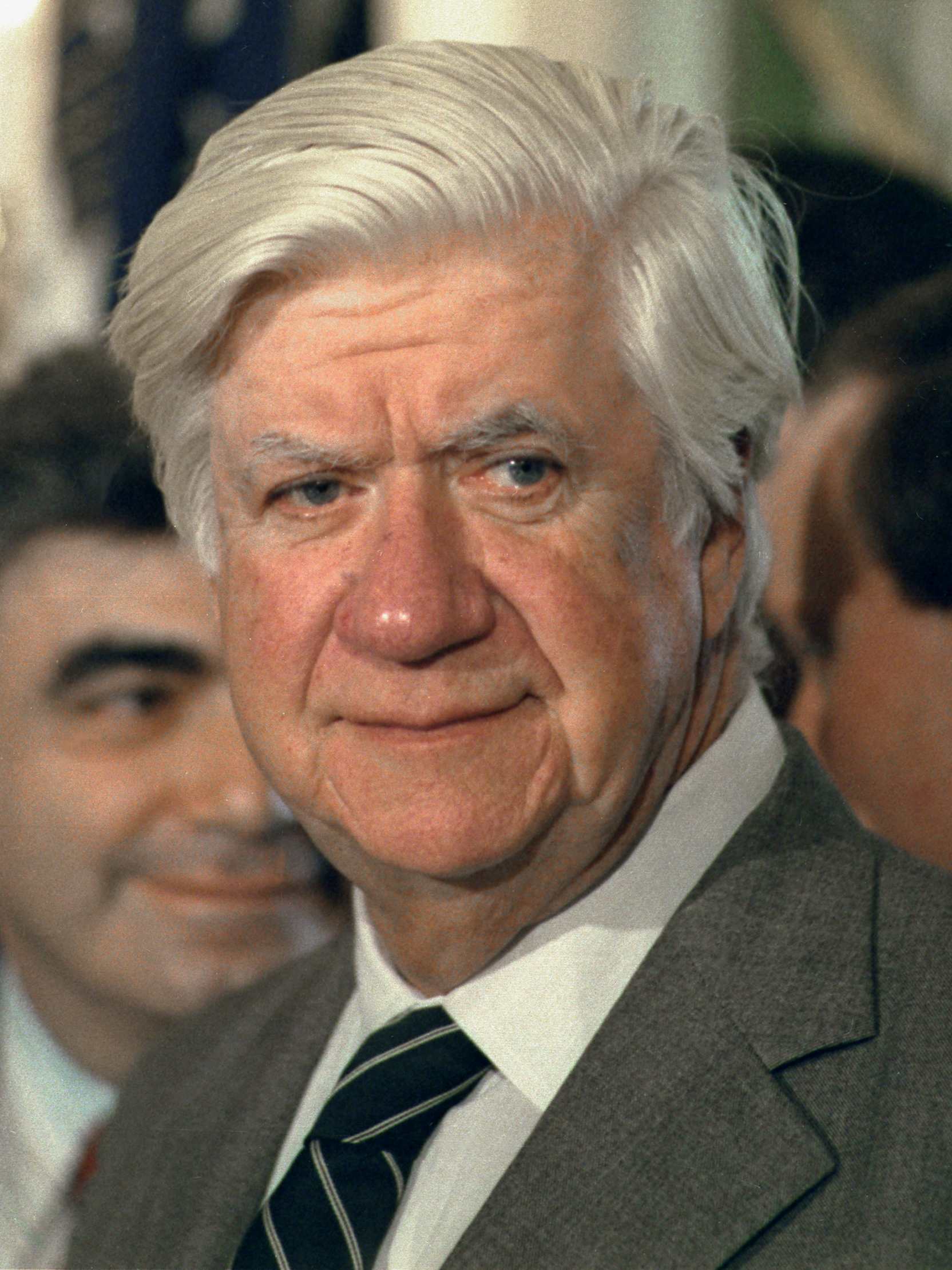

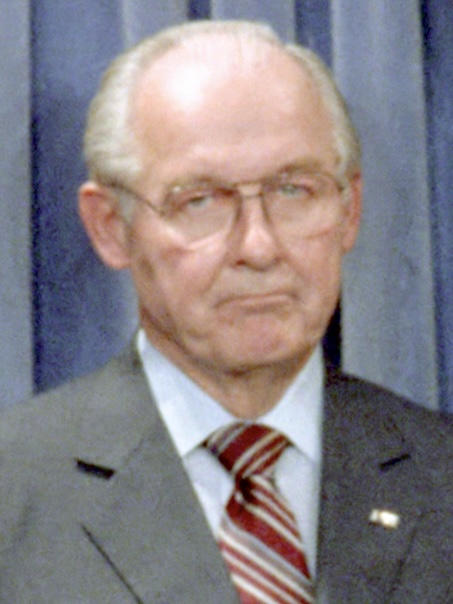
| | Majority party | Minority party |
|---|---|---|
| Leader | Tip O'Neill | Bob Michel |
| Party | Democratic | Republican |
| Leader since | January 4, 1977 | January 3, 1981 |
| Leader's seat | Massachusetts 8th | Illinois 18th |
| Last election | 269 seats | 165 seats |
| Seats won | 253 | 181 |
| Seat change | ▼16 | ▲16 |
| Popular vote | 42,973,494 | 38,642,646 |
| Percentage | 52.1% | 47.0% |
| Swing | ▼3.1pp | ▲3.6pp |
| | Third party |
| Party | Conservative |
| Last election | 1 (Note: Caucused with Republicans.) |
| Seats won | 1 |
| Seat change | Steady |
| Popular vote | 117,872 |
| Percentage | 0.1% |
| Swing | ▼0.1pp |
- Results: Democratic hold Democratic gain Republican hold Republican gain Conservative hold
Speaker before election
Tip O'Neill
Democratic
Elected Speaker
Tip O'Neill
Democratic

The 1984 United States House of Representatives elections was an election for the United States House of Representatives on November 6, 1984, to elect members to serve in the 99th United States Congress. They coincided with the re-election of President Ronald Reagan in a landslide. This victory also yielded gains for Reagan's Republican Party in the House, where they picked up a net of sixteen seats from the Democratic Party. Despite Reagan's extremely large electoral victory, the Democrats nonetheless retained a commanding majority in the House and actually gained seats in the Senate. These elections were the last to date where a member of a party other than the Democrats, Republicans, or an independent won one or more seats in the chamber.

This would be the last time for eight years that the Democrats experienced a net loss of seats in the House.

== Overall results ==
411 incumbent members sought reelection, but 3 were defeated in primaries and 16 defeated in the general election for a total of 392 incumbents winning.

↓
| 253 | 1 | 181 |
| Democratic | C | Republican |

| Party | Seats | | | Seat percentage | Vote percentage | Popular vote |
| Party | Last election (1982) | This election | Net change | Seat percentage | Vote percentage | Popular vote |
|---|---|---|---|---|---|---|
| Democratic Party | 269 | 253 | ▼16 | 58.2% | 52.1% | 42,973,494 |
| Republican Party | 165 | 181 | ▲16 | 41.6% | 47.0% | 38,642,646 |
| Libertarian Party | 0 | 0 | Steady | 0.0% | 0.3% | 275,865 |
| Independent | 0 | 0 | Steady | 0.0% | 0.2% | 121,187 |
| Conservative Party | 1 | 1 | Steady | 0.2% | 0.1% | 117,872 |
| Peace and Freedom Party | 0 | 0 | Steady | 0.0% | 0.1% | 61,543 |
| Others | 0 | 0 | Steady | 0.0% | 0.3% | 229,231 |
| Total | 435 | 435 | 0 | 100.0% | 100.0% | 82,421,838 |
Source: Election Statistics - Office of the Clerk

Popular vote
| Democratic | 52.14% |
| Republican | 47.00% |
| Libertarian | 0.33% |
| Conservative | 0.14% |
| Others | 0.39% |

House seats
| Democratic | 58.16% |
| Republican | 41.60% |
| Conservative | 0.23% |

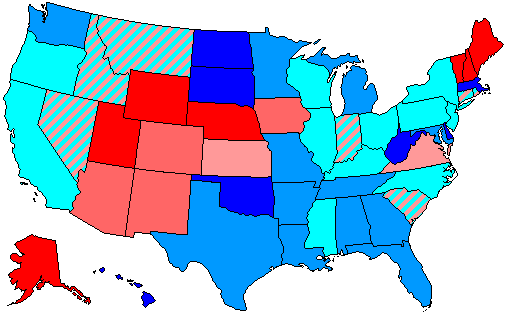
House seats by party holding plurality in state: 80+ to 100% Republican / 80+ to 100% Democratic; 60+ to 80% Republican / 60+ to 80% Democratic; 50+ to 60% Republican / 50+ to 60% Democratic

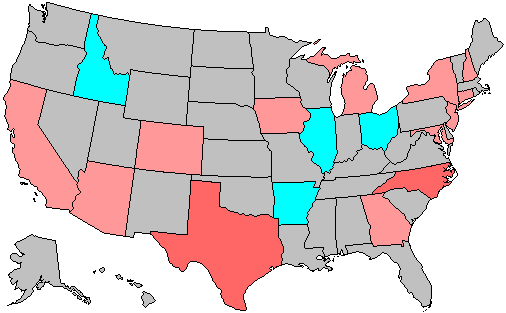
6+ Republican gain / 6+ Democratic gain; 3–5 Republican gain / 3–5 Democratic gain; 1–2 Republican gain / 1–2 Democratic gain; no net change

== Retiring incumbents ==
Twenty-two representatives retired. Sixteen of those seats were held by the same party, six seats changed party.

=== Democrats ===
Nine Democrats retired. Four of those seats were held by Democrats and five were won by Republicans.

==== Democratic held ====
1. Illinois 22: Paul Simon: to run for U.S. Senate. Was succeeded by Kenneth J. Gray.
2. Massachusetts 5: James Shannon: to run for U.S. Senate. Was succeeded by Chester G. Atkins.
3. New York 9: Geraldine Ferraro: to run for Vice President. Was succeeded by Thomas Manton.
4. Tennessee 6: Al Gore: to run for U.S. Senate. Was succeeded by Bart Gordon.

==== Republican gain ====
1. Colorado 3: Ray Kogovsek. Was succeeded by Michael L. Strang.
2. Iowa 5: Tom Harkin: to run for U.S. Senate. Was succeeded by Jim Ross Lightfoot.
3. New Hampshire 1: Norman D'Amours: to run for U.S. Senate. Was succeeded by Bob Smith.
4. New York 20: Richard Ottinger. Was succeeded by Joe DioGuardi.
5. Texas 19: Kent Hance: to run for U.S. Senate. Was succeeded by Larry Combest.

=== Republicans ===
Thirteen Republicans retired. Twelve of those seats were held by Republicans and one was won by a Democrat.

==== Republican held ====
1. Alabama 1: Jack Edwards. Was succeeded by Sonny Callahan.
2. Illinois 13: John N. Erlenborn. Was succeeded by Harris Fawell.
3. Illinois 14: Tom Corcoran: to run for U.S. Senate. Was succeeded by John E. Grotberg.
4. Kansas 3: Larry Winn. Was succeeded by Jan Meyers.
5. Michigan 5: Harold S. Sawyer. Was succeeded by Paul B. Henry.
6. New York 30: Barber Conable. Was succeeded by Fred J. Eckert.
7. North Carolina 9: James G. Martin: to run for Governor of North Carolina. Was succeeded by Alex McMillan.
8. Texas 6: Phil Gramm: to run for U.S. Senate. Was succeeded by Joe Barton.
9. Texas 22: Ron Paul: to run for U.S. Senate. Was succeeded by Tom DeLay.
10. Utah 2: David Daniel Marriott: to run for Governor of Utah. Was succeeded by David Smith Monson.
11. Virginia 7: J. Kenneth Robinson. Was succeeded by D. French Slaughter Jr.
12. Washington 1: Joel Pritchard. Was succeeded by John Miller.

==== Democratic gain ====
1. Arkansas 2: Ed Bethune: to run for U.S. Senate. Was succeeded by Tommy F. Robinson.

== Defeated incumbents ==
=== In primary election ===
==== Democrats ====
Three Democrats lost renomination.

1. Indiana 1: Katie Hall lost to challenger Pete Visclosky.
2. Pennsylvania 11: Frank Harrison lost to challenger Paul Kanjorski.
3. Texas 23: Abraham Kazen lost to challenger Albert Bustamante.

=== In the general election ===
==== Democrats ====
Thirteen Democrats lost re-election.

1. Arizona 5: James F. McNulty Jr. lost to Jim Kolbe.
2. California 38: Jerry M. Patterson lost to Bob Dornan.
3. Connecticut 5: William R. Ratchford lost to John G. Rowland.
4. Georgia 4: Elliott H. Levitas lost to Pat Swindall.
5. Maryland 2: Clarence Long lost to Helen Delich Bentley.
6. Michigan 10: Donald J. Albosta lost to Bill Schuette.
7. New Jersey 11: Joseph Minish lost to Dean Gallo.
8. North Carolina 4: Ike Franklin Andrews lost to Bill Cobey.
9. North Carolina 6: Charles Robin Britt lost to Howard Coble.
10. North Carolina 11: James M. Clarke lost to Bill Hendon.
11. Texas 13: Jack Hightower lost to Beau Boulter.
12. Texas 14: Bill Patman lost to Mac Sweeney.
13. Texas 26: Tom Vandergriff lost to Dick Armey.

==== Republicans ====
Three Republicans lost re-election.

1. Idaho 2: George V. Hansen lost to Richard H. Stallings.
2. Illinois 19: Dan Crane lost to Terry L. Bruce.
3. Ohio 17: Lyle Williams lost to Jim Traficant.

== Special elections ==
There were three special elections to the 98th Congress in 1984, two of which were held on the same day as the general election for the next term.

Elections are sorted here by date then district.

| District | Incumbent | Party | First elected | Result | Candidates |
|---|---|---|---|---|---|
| Wisconsin 4 | Clement Zablocki | Democratic | 1948 | Incumbent died December 2, 1983. New member elected April 3, 1984. Democratic hold. Winner was subsequently re-elected in November. | ▌ ✓ Jerry Kleczka (Democratic) 65.1%; ▌Robert V. Nolan (Republican) 34.9% |
| Kentucky 7 | Carl D. Perkins | Democratic | 1948 | Incumbent died August 3, 1984. New member elected November 6, 1984. Democratic hold. Winner was also elected to the next term the same day. | ▌ ✓ Chris Perkins (Democratic) 82.5%; ▌Aubrey Russell (Republican) 17.5% |
| New Jersey 13 | Edwin B. Forsythe | Republican | 1970 | Incumbent died March 29, 1984. New member elected November 6, 1984. Republican hold. Winner was also elected to the next term the same day. | ▌ ✓ Jim Saxton (Republican) 61.5%; ▌James B. Smith (Democratic) 37.8%; ▌Donald L. Smith (Independent) 0.7% |

== Alabama ==
| District | Incumbent | | | This race | |
| District | Representative | Party | First elected | Results | Candidates |
|---|---|---|---|---|---|
| Alabama 1 | Jack Edwards | Republican | 1964 | Incumbent retired. Republican hold. | ▌ ✓ Sonny Callahan (Republican) 51.0%; ▌Frank McWright (Democratic) 49.0% |
| Alabama 2 | Bill Dickinson | Republican | 1964 | Incumbent re-elected. | ▌ ✓ Bill Dickinson (Republican) 60.3%; ▌Larry Lee (Democratic) 38.6%; ▌Frank Tipler III (Libertarian) 1.1% |
| Alabama 3 | Bill Nichols | Democratic | 1966 | Incumbent re-elected. | ▌ ✓ Bill Nichols (Democratic) 96.2%; ▌Mark Thornton (Libertarian) 3.8% |
| Alabama 4 | Tom Bevill | Democratic | 1966 | Incumbent re-elected. | ▌ ✓ Tom Bevill (Democratic) 100% |
| Alabama 5 | Ronnie Flippo | Democratic | 1976 | Incumbent re-elected. | ▌ ✓ Ronnie Flippo (Democratic) 95.9%; ▌D. M. Samsil (Libertarian) 4.1% |
| Alabama 6 | Ben Erdreich | Democratic | 1982 | Incumbent re-elected. | ▌ ✓ Ben Erdreich (Democratic) 59.6%; ▌J. T. Waggoner (Republican) 39.8%; Others: ▌Steve Smith (Libertarian) 0.5%; ▌Mark Curtis (Socialist Workers) 0.1% |
| Alabama 7 | Richard Shelby | Democratic | 1978 | Incumbent re-elected. | ▌ ✓ Richard Shelby (Democratic) 96.8%; ▌Chuck Ewing (Libertarian) 3.2% |

== Alaska ==
| District | Incumbent | | | This race | |
| District | Representative | Party | First elected | Results | Candidates |
|---|---|---|---|---|---|
| Alaska at-large | Don Young | Republican | 1973 | Incumbent re-elected. | ▌ ✓ Don Young (Republican) 55.1%; ▌Pegge Begich (Democratic) 41.7%; ▌Betty Breck (Independent) 3.2% |

== Arizona ==
| District | Incumbent | | | This race | |
| District | Representative | Party | First elected | Results | Candidates |
|---|---|---|---|---|---|
| Arizona 1 | John McCain | Republican | 1982 | Incumbent re-elected. | ▌ ✓ John McCain (Republican) 78.1%; ▌Harry Braun (Democratic) 21.9% |
| Arizona 2 | Mo Udall | Democratic | 1961 (special) | Incumbent re-elected. | ▌ ✓ Mo Udall (Democratic) 87.7%; ▌Lorenzo Torrez (Independent) 12.3% |
| Arizona 3 | Bob Stump | Republican | 1976 (Note: Stump was originally elected as a Democrat. He switched parties in 1982 and was re-elected as such that year.) | Incumbent re-elected. | ▌ ✓ Bob Stump (Republican) 71.8%; ▌Bob Schuster (Democratic) 26.5%; ▌Lorraina M. Valencia (Libertarian) 1.8% |
| Arizona 4 | Eldon Rudd | Republican | 1976 | Incumbent re-elected. | ▌ ✓ Eldon Rudd (Republican) 100% |
| Arizona 5 | Jim McNulty | Democratic | 1982 | Incumbent lost re-election. Republican gain. | ▌ ✓ Jim Kolbe (Republican) 50.9%; ▌Jim McNulty (Democratic) 48.2%; ▌Herb Johnson (Libertarian) 0.9% |

== Arkansas ==
| District | Incumbent | | | This race | |
| District | Representative | Party | First elected | Results | Candidates |
|---|---|---|---|---|---|
| Arkansas 1 | Bill Alexander | Democratic | 1968 | Incumbent re-elected. | ▌ ✓ Bill Alexander (Democratic) 97.2%; Pete Cochran (Write In) 2.8% |
| Arkansas 2 | Ed Bethune | Republican | 1978 | Incumbent retired to run for U.S. Senator. Democratic gain. | ▌ ✓ Tommy F. Robinson (Democratic) 47.1%; ▌Judy Petty (Republican) 41.5%; ▌Jim Taylor (Independent) 11.4% |
| Arkansas 3 | John Paul Hammerschmidt | Republican | 1966 | Incumbent re-elected. | ▌ ✓ John Paul Hammerschmidt (Republican) 100% |
| Arkansas 4 | Beryl Anthony Jr. | Democratic | 1978 | Incumbent re-elected. | ▌ ✓ Beryl Anthony Jr. (Democratic) Uncontested |

== California ==
| District | Incumbent | | | This race | |
| District | Representative | Party | First elected | Results | Candidates |
|---|---|---|---|---|---|
| California 1 | Douglas H. Bosco | Democratic | 1982 | Incumbent re-elected. | ▌ ✓ Douglas H. Bosco (Democratic) 62.3%; ▌David Redick (Republican) 37.7% |
| California 2 | Eugene A. Chappie | Republican | 1980 | Incumbent re-elected. | ▌ ✓ Eugene A. Chappie (Republican) 69.5%; ▌Harry Cozad (Democratic) 30.5% |
| California 3 | Bob Matsui | Democratic | 1978 | Incumbent re-elected. | ▌ ✓ Bob Matsui (Democratic) 99.9% |
| California 4 | Vic Fazio | Democratic | 1978 | Incumbent re-elected. | ▌ ✓ Vic Fazio (Democratic) 61.4%; ▌Roger B. Canfield (Republican) 36.7%; ▌Roger Conant Pope (Libertarian) 1.9% |
| California 5 | Sala Burton | Democratic | 1983 | Incumbent re-elected. | ▌ ✓ Sala Burton (Democratic) 72.3%; ▌Tom Spinosa (Republican) 23.8%; ▌Joseph Fuhrig (Libertarian) 2.1%; ▌Henry Clark (Peace and Freedom) 1.8% |
| California 6 | Barbara Boxer | Democratic | 1982 | Incumbent re-elected. | ▌ ✓ Barbara Boxer (Democratic) 68.0%; ▌Douglas Binderup (Republican) 29.7%; ▌Howard C. Creighton (Libertarian) 2.3% |
| California 7 | George Miller | Democratic | 1974 | Incumbent re-elected. | ▌ ✓ George Miller (Democratic) 66.7%; ▌Rosemary Thakar (Republican) 33.3% |
| California 8 | Ron Dellums | Democratic | 1970 | Incumbent re-elected. | ▌ ✓ Ron Dellums (Democratic) 60.3%; ▌Charles Connor (Republican) 39.7% |
| California 9 | Pete Stark | Democratic | 1972 | Incumbent re-elected. | ▌ ✓ Pete Stark (Democratic) 69.9%; ▌J. T. Eager Beaver (Republican) 26.3%; ▌Martha Fuhrig (Libertarian) 3.8% |
| California 10 | Don Edwards | Democratic | 1962 | Incumbent re-elected. | ▌ ✓ Don Edwards (Democratic) 62.4%; ▌Bob Herriott (Republican) 34.3%; ▌Perr Cardestam (Libertarian) 1.7%; ▌Edmon V. Kaiser (American Independent) 1.6% |
| California 11 | Tom Lantos | Democratic | 1980 | Incumbent re-elected. | ▌ ✓ Tom Lantos (Democratic) 69.9%; ▌Jack Hickey (Republican) 28.2%; ▌Nicholas Kudrovzeff (American Independent) 1.8% |
| California 12 | Ed Zschau | Republican | 1982 | Incumbent re-elected. | ▌ ✓ Ed Zschau (Republican) 61.7%; ▌Martin Carnoy (Democratic) 36.0%; ▌Bill White (Libertarian) 2.3% |
| California 13 | Norman Mineta | Democratic | 1974 | Incumbent re-elected. | ▌ ✓ Norman Mineta (Democratic) 65.2%; ▌Jack Williams (Republican) 33.0%; ▌John R. Redding (Libertarian) 1.8% |
| California 14 | Norm Shumway | Republican | 1978 | Incumbent re-elected. | ▌ ✓ Norm Shumway (Republican) 73.3%; ▌Paula Carlson (Democratic) 23.9%; ▌Fred W. Colburn (Libertarian) 2.8% |
| California 15 | Tony Coelho | Democratic | 1978 | Incumbent re-elected. | ▌ ✓ Tony Coelho (Democratic) 64.0%; ▌Carol O. Harner (Republican) 32.0%; ▌Richard M. Harris (Libertarian) 4.0% |
| California 16 | Leon Panetta | Democratic | 1976 | Incumbent re-elected. | ▌ ✓ Leon Panetta (Democratic) 70.8%; ▌Patricia Smith Ramsey (Republican) 27.7%; ▌Bill Anderson (Libertarian) 1.5% |
| California 17 | Chip Pashayan | Republican | 1978 | Incumbent re-elected. | ▌ ✓ Chip Pashayan (Republican) 72.5%; ▌Simon Lakritz (Democratic) 27.5% |
| California 18 | Rick Lehman | Democratic | 1982 | Incumbent re-elected. | ▌ ✓ Rick Lehman (Democratic) 67.3%; ▌Dale L. Ewen (Republican) 32.7% |
| California 19 | Bob Lagomarsino | Republican | 1974 | Incumbent re-elected. | ▌ ✓ Bob Lagomarsino (Republican) 67.3%; ▌James C. Carey Jr. (Democratic) 30.9%; ▌Charles John Zekan (Peace and Freedom) 1.8% |
| California 20 | Bill Thomas | Republican | 1978 | Incumbent re-elected. | ▌ ✓ Bill Thomas (Republican) 70.9%; ▌Michael T. LeSage (Democratic) 29.1% |
| California 21 | Bobbi Fiedler | Republican | 1980 | Incumbent re-elected. | ▌ ✓ Bobbi Fiedler (Republican) 72.3%; ▌Charlie Davis (Democratic) 25.9%; ▌Robert Townsend Leet (Libertarian) 1.8% |
| California 22 | Carlos Moorhead | Republican | 1972 | Incumbent re-elected. | ▌ ✓ Carlos Moorhead (Republican) 85.2%; ▌Michael B. Yauch (Libertarian) 14.8% |
| California 23 | Anthony Beilenson | Democratic | 1976 | Incumbent re-elected. | ▌ ✓ Anthony Beilenson (Democratic) 61.6%; ▌Claude W. Parrish (Republican) 36.9%; ▌Larry Leathers (Libertarian) 1.6% |
| California 24 | Henry Waxman | Democratic | 1974 | Incumbent re-elected. | ▌ ✓ Henry Waxman (Democratic) 63.4%; ▌Jerry Zerg (Republican) 33.2%; ▌James Green (Peace and Freedom) 1.8%; ▌Tim Custer (Libertarian) 1.6% |
| California 25 | Edward R. Roybal | Democratic | 1962 | Incumbent re-elected. | ▌ ✓ Edward R. Roybal (Democratic) 71.7%; ▌Bill Bloxom (Republican) 24.1%; ▌Anthony G. Bajada (Libertarian) 4.2% |
| California 26 | Howard Berman | Democratic | 1982 | Incumbent re-elected. | ▌ ✓ Howard Berman (Democratic) 62.8%; ▌Miriam Ojeda (Republican) 37.2% |
| California 27 | Mel Levine | Democratic | 1982 | Incumbent re-elected. | ▌ ✓ Mel Levine (Democratic) 55.0%; ▌Robert B. Scribner (Republican) 41.8%; ▌Thomas O'Connor (Peace and Freedom) 1.8%; ▌Jeff Avrech (Libertarian) 1.5% |
| California 28 | Julian Dixon | Democratic | 1978 | Incumbent re-elected. | ▌ ✓ Julian Dixon (Democratic) 75.6%; ▌Beatrice M. Jett (Republican) 22.4%; ▌Don S. Frederick (Libertarian) 2.0% |
| California 29 | Augustus Hawkins | Democratic | 1962 | Incumbent re-elected. | ▌ ✓ Augustus Hawkins (Democratic) 86.6%; ▌Echo Y. Goto (Republican) 13.4% |
| California 30 | Matthew G. Martínez | Democratic | 1982 | Incumbent re-elected. | ▌ ✓ Matthew G. Martínez (Democratic) 51.8%; ▌Richard Gomez (Republican) 43.4%; ▌Houston A. Myers (American Independent) 4.9% |
| California 31 | Mervyn Dymally | Democratic | 1980 | Incumbent re-elected. | ▌ ✓ Mervyn Dymally (Democratic) 70.7%; ▌Henry C. Minturn (Republican) 29.3% |
| California 32 | Glenn M. Anderson | Democratic | 1968 | Incumbent re-elected. | ▌ ✓ Glenn M. Anderson (Democratic) 60.7%; ▌Roger E. Fiola (Republican) 36.6%; ▌Marc F. Denny (Libertarian) 1.5%; ▌Patrick J. McCoy (Peace and Freedom) 1.2% |
| California 33 | David Dreier | Republican | 1980 | Incumbent re-elected. | ▌ ✓ David Dreier (Republican) 70.6%; ▌Claire K. McDonald (Democratic) 26.0%; ▌Gail Lightfoot (Libertarian) 2.3%; ▌Mike Noonan (Peace and Freedom) 1.1% |
| California 34 | Esteban Torres | Democratic | 1982 | Incumbent re-elected. | ▌ ✓ Esteban Torres (Democratic) 59.8%; ▌Paul R. Jackson (Republican) 40.2% |
| California 35 | Jerry Lewis | Republican | 1978 | Incumbent re-elected. | ▌ ✓ Jerry Lewis (Republican) 85.5%; ▌Kevin Akin (Peace and Freedom) 14.5% |
| California 36 | George Brown Jr. | Democratic | 1962; 1970 (retired); 1972 | Incumbent re-elected. | ▌ ✓ George Brown Jr. (Democratic) 56.6%; ▌John Paul Stark (Republican) 43.4% |
| California 37 | Al McCandless | Republican | 1982 | Incumbent re-elected. | ▌ ✓ Al McCandless (Republican) 63.6%; ▌Dave Skinner (Democratic) 36.4% |
| California 38 | Jerry M. Patterson | Democratic | 1974 | Incumbent lost re-election. Republican gain. | ▌ ✓ Bob Dornan (Republican) 53.2%; ▌Jerry M. Patterson (Democratic) 45.0%; ▌Michael S. Bright (Peace and Freedom) 1.9% |
| California 39 | Bill Dannemeyer | Republican | 1978 | Incumbent re-elected. | ▌ ✓ Bill Dannemeyer (Republican) 76.2%; ▌Robert E. Ward (Democratic) 23.8% |
| California 40 | Robert Badham | Republican | 1976 | Incumbent re-elected. | ▌ ✓ Robert Badham (Republican) 64.4%; ▌Carol Ann Bradford (Democratic) 34.0%; ▌Maxine Bell Quirk (Peace and Freedom) 1.6% |
| California 41 | Bill Lowery | Republican | 1980 | Incumbent re-elected. | ▌ ✓ Bill Lowery (Republican) 63.5%; ▌Bob Simmons (Democratic) 33.7%; ▌Sara Baase (Libertarian) 2.9% |
| California 42 | Dan Lungren | Republican | 1978 | Incumbent re-elected. | ▌ ✓ Dan Lungren (Republican) 73.0%; ▌Mary Lou Brophy (Democratic) 24.6%; ▌John S. Donohue (Peace and Freedom) 2.4% |
| California 43 | Ron Packard | Republican | 1982 | Incumbent re-elected. | ▌ ✓ Ron Packard (Republican) 74.1%; ▌Lois E. Humphreys (Democratic) 22.8%; ▌Phyllis Avery (Libertarian) 3.1% |
| California 44 | Jim Bates | Democratic | 1982 | Incumbent re-elected. | ▌ ✓ Jim Bates (Democratic) 69.7%; ▌Neill Campbell (Republican) 28.0%; ▌Jim Conole (Libertarian) 2.2% |
| California 45 | Duncan L. Hunter | Republican | 1980 | Incumbent re-elected. | ▌ ✓ Duncan L. Hunter (Republican) 75.1%; ▌David W. Guthrie (Democratic) 22.9%; ▌Pat Wright (Libertarian) 2.0% |

== Colorado ==
| District | Incumbent | | | This race | |
| District | Representative | Party | First elected | Results | Candidates |
|---|---|---|---|---|---|
| Colorado 1 | Pat Schroeder | Democratic | 1972 | Incumbent re-elected. | ▌ ✓ Pat Schroeder (Democratic) 62.0%; ▌Mary Downs (Republican) 36.3%; Others: ▌Cathy Emminizer (Socialist Workers) 0.9%; ▌Dwight Filley (Libertarian) 0.8% |
| Colorado 2 | Tim Wirth | Democratic | 1974 | Incumbent re-elected. | ▌ ✓ Tim Wirth (Democratic) 53.2%; ▌Mike Norton (Republican) 45.5%; ▌Jerry Van Sickle (Libertarian) 1.3% |
| Colorado 3 | Ray Kogovsek | Democratic | 1978 | Incumbent retired. Republican gain. | ▌ ✓ Mike Strang (Republican) 57.1%; ▌W Mitchell (Democratic) 41.9%; Others: ▌Robert Jahelka (Libertarian) 0.6%; ▌Henry John Olshaw (Independent) 0.4% |
| Colorado 4 | Hank Brown | Republican | 1980 | Incumbent re-elected. | ▌ ✓ Hank Brown (Republican) 71.1%; ▌Mary Fagan Bates (Democratic) 27.4%; ▌Randy Fitzgerald (Libertarian) 1.5% |
| Colorado 5 | Ken Kramer | Republican | 1978 | Incumbent re-elected. | ▌ ✓ Ken Kramer (Republican) 78.6%; ▌William Geffen (Democratic) 21.4% |
| Colorado 6 | Daniel Schaefer | Republican | 1983 (special) | Incumbent re-elected. | ▌ ✓ Daniel Schaefer (Republican) 89.4%; ▌John Heckman (Independent) 10.6% |

== Connecticut ==
| District | Incumbent | | | This race | |
| District | Representative | Party | First elected | Results | Candidates |
|---|---|---|---|---|---|
| Connecticut 1 | Barbara B. Kennelly | Democratic | 1982 | Incumbent re-elected. | ▌ ✓ Barbara B. Kennelly (Democratic) 61.7%; ▌Herschel A. Klein (Republican) 37.9%; ▌Charles F. Sundblade (Libertarian) 0.3% |
| Connecticut 2 | Sam Gejdenson | Democratic | 1980 | Incumbent re-elected. | ▌ ✓ Sam Gejdenson (Democratic) 54.4%; ▌Roberta F. Koontz (Republican) 45.2%; ▌Donald W. Wood (Libertarian) 0.4% |
| Connecticut 3 | Bruce Morrison | Democratic | 1982 | Incumbent re-elected. | ▌ ✓ Bruce Morrison (Democratic) 52.6%; ▌Larry DeNardis (Republican) 47.2%; Others: ▌Michael R. Cohen (Libertarian) 0.2%; ▌James J. Valenti (Independent) 0.1% |
| Connecticut 4 | Stewart McKinney | Republican | 1970 | Incumbent re-elected. | ▌ ✓ Stewart McKinney (Republican) 70.4%; ▌John M. Orman (Democratic) 29.6% |
| Connecticut 5 | William R. Ratchford | Democratic | 1978 | Incumbent lost re-election. Republican gain. | ▌ ✓ John G. Rowland (Republican) 54.3%; ▌William R. Ratchford (Democratic) 45.5%; ▌James P. Peron (Libertarian) 0.2% |
| Connecticut 6 | Nancy Johnson | Republican | 1982 | Incumbent re-elected. | ▌ ✓ Nancy Johnson (Republican) 64.0%; ▌Arthur H. House (Democratic) 36.0% |

== Delaware ==
| District | Incumbent | | | This race | |
| District | Representative | Party | First elected | Results | Candidates |
|---|---|---|---|---|---|
| Delaware at-large | Tom Carper | Democratic | 1982 | Incumbent re-elected. | ▌ ✓ Tom Carper (Democratic) 58.5%; ▌Elise du Pont (Republican) 41.4%; ▌V. Luther Etzel (Libertarian) 0.1% |

== Florida ==
| District | Incumbent | | | This race | |
| District | Representative | Party | First elected | Results | Candidates |
|---|---|---|---|---|---|
| Florida 1 | Earl Hutto | Democratic | 1978 | Incumbent re-elected. | ▌ ✓ Earl Hutto (Democratic) Uncontested |
| Florida 2 | Don Fuqua | Democratic | 1962 | Incumbent re-elected. | ▌ ✓ Don Fuqua (Democratic) Uncontested |
| Florida 3 | Charles E. Bennett | Democratic | 1948 | Incumbent re-elected. | ▌ ✓ Charles E. Bennett (Democratic) Uncontested |
| Florida 4 | Bill Chappell | Democratic | 1968 | Incumbent re-elected. | ▌ ✓ Bill Chappell (Democratic) 64.8%; ▌Alton H. Starling (Republican) 35.2% |
| Florida 5 | Bill McCollum | Republican | 1980 | Incumbent re-elected. | ▌ ✓ Bill McCollum (Republican) Uncontested |
| Florida 6 | Buddy MacKay | Democratic | 1982 | Incumbent re-elected. | ▌ ✓ Buddy MacKay (Democratic) 99.3% |
| Florida 7 | Sam Gibbons | Democratic | 1962 | Incumbent re-elected. | ▌ ✓ Sam Gibbons (Democratic) 58.8%; ▌Michael N. Kavouklis (Republican) 41.2% |
| Florida 8 | Bill Young | Republican | 1970 | Incumbent re-elected. | ▌ ✓ Bill Young (Republican) 80.3%; ▌Robert Kent (Democratic) 19.7% |
| Florida 9 | Michael Bilirakis | Republican | 1982 | Incumbent re-elected. | ▌ ✓ Michael Bilirakis (Republican) 78.6%; ▌Jack Wilson (Democratic) 21.4% |
| Florida 10 | Andy Ireland | Democratic | 1976 | Incumbent re-elected as a Republican. Republican gain. | ▌ ✓ Andy Ireland (Republican) 61.9%; ▌Patricia M. Glass (Democratic) 38.1% |
| Florida 11 | Bill Nelson | Democratic | 1978 | Incumbent re-elected. | ▌ ✓ Bill Nelson (Democratic) 60.5%; ▌Rob Quartel (Republican) 39.5% |
| Florida 12 | Tom Lewis | Republican | 1982 | Incumbent re-elected. | ▌ ✓ Tom Lewis (Republican) Uncontested |
| Florida 13 | Connie Mack III | Republican | 1982 | Incumbent re-elected. | ▌ ✓ Connie Mack III (Republican) Uncontested |
| Florida 14 | Dan Mica | Democratic | 1978 | Incumbent re-elected. | ▌ ✓ Dan Mica (Democratic) 55.4%; ▌Don Ross (Republican) 44.6% |
| Florida 15 | Clay Shaw | Republican | 1980 | Incumbent re-elected. | ▌ ✓ Clay Shaw (Republican) 65.7%; ▌Bill Humphrey (Democratic) 34.3% |
| Florida 16 | Lawrence J. Smith | Democratic | 1982 | Incumbent re-elected. | ▌ ✓ Lawrence J. Smith (Democratic) 56.4%; ▌Tom Bush (Republican) 43.6% |
| Florida 17 | William Lehman | Democratic | 1972 | Incumbent re-elected. | ▌ ✓ William Lehman (Democratic) Uncontested |
| Florida 18 | Claude Pepper | Democratic | 1962 | Incumbent re-elected. | ▌ ✓ Claude Pepper (Democratic) 60.5%; ▌Ricardo Nunez (Republican) 39.5% |
| Florida 19 | Dante Fascell | Democratic | 1954 | Incumbent re-elected. | ▌ ✓ Dante Fascell (Democratic) 64.3%; ▌Bill Flanagan (Republican) 35.7% |

== Georgia ==
| District | Incumbent | | | This race | |
| District | Representative | Party | First elected | Results | Candidates |
|---|---|---|---|---|---|
| Georgia 1 | Lindsay Thomas | Democratic | 1982 | Incumbent re-elected. | ▌ ✓ Lindsay Thomas (Democratic) 81.6%; ▌Erie Lee Downing (Republican) 18.4% |
| Georgia 2 | Charles Hatcher | Democratic | 1980 | Incumbent re-elected. | ▌ ✓ Charles Hatcher (Democratic) 100% |
| Georgia 3 | Richard Ray | Democratic | 1982 | Incumbent re-elected. | ▌ ✓ Richard Ray (Democratic) 81.4%; ▌Mitch Cantu (Republican) 18.6% |
| Georgia 4 | Elliott H. Levitas | Democratic | 1974 | Incumbent lost re-election. Republican gain. | ▌ ✓ Pat Swindall (Republican) 53.1%; ▌Elliott H. Levitas (Democratic) 46.9% |
| Georgia 5 | Wyche Fowler | Democratic | 1977 (special) | Incumbent re-elected. | ▌ ✓ Wyche Fowler (Democratic) 100% |
| Georgia 6 | Newt Gingrich | Republican | 1978 | Incumbent re-elected. | ▌ ✓ Newt Gingrich (Republican) 69.1%; ▌Gerald L. Johnson (Democratic) 30.9% |
| Georgia 7 | George Darden | Democratic | 1983 | Incumbent re-elected. | ▌ ✓ George Darden (Democratic) 55.2%; ▌Bill Bronson (Republican) 44.8% |
| Georgia 8 | J. Roy Rowland | Democratic | 1982 | Incumbent re-elected. | ▌ ✓ J. Roy Rowland (Democratic) 100% |
| Georgia 9 | Ed Jenkins | Democratic | 1976 | Incumbent re-elected. | ▌ ✓ Ed Jenkins (Democratic) 67.5%; ▌Frank H. Cofer Jr. (Republican) 32.5% |
| Georgia 10 | Doug Barnard Jr. | Democratic | 1976 | Incumbent re-elected. | ▌ ✓ Doug Barnard Jr. (Democratic) 100% |

== Hawaii ==
| District | Incumbent | | | This race | |
| District | Representative | Party | First elected | Results | Candidates |
|---|---|---|---|---|---|
| Hawaii 1 | Cecil Heftel | Democratic | 1976 | Incumbent re-elected. | ▌ ✓ Cecil Heftel (Democratic) 82.7%; ▌Will Beard (Republican) 14.8%; ▌Christopher Winter (Libertarian) 2.4% |
| Hawaii 2 | Daniel Akaka | Democratic | 1976 | Incumbent re-elected. | ▌ ✓ Daniel Akaka (Democratic) 82.2%; ▌A. D. "Al" Shipley (Republican) 14.6%; ▌Amelia Lew Fritts (Libertarian) 3.2% |

== Idaho ==
| District | Incumbent | | | This race | |
| District | Representative | Party | First elected | Results | Candidates |
|---|---|---|---|---|---|
| Idaho 1 | Larry Craig | Republican | 1980 | Incumbent re-elected. | ▌ ✓ Larry Craig (Republican) 68.6%; ▌Bill Heller (Democratic) 31.4% |
| Idaho 2 | George V. Hansen | Republican | 1964; 1968 (retired); 1974 | Incumbent lost re-election. Democratic gain. | ▌ ✓ Richard H. Stallings (Democratic) 50.0%; ▌George V. Hansen (Republican) 50.0% |

== Illinois ==
| District | Incumbent | | | This race | |
| District | Representative | Party | First elected | Results | Candidates |
|---|---|---|---|---|---|
| Illinois 1 | Charles Hayes | Democratic | 1983 (special) | Incumbent re-elected. | ▌ ✓ Charles Hayes (Democratic) 95.6% |
| Illinois 2 | Gus Savage | Democratic | 1980 | Incumbent re-elected. | ▌ ✓ Gus Savage (Democratic) 83.0%; ▌Dale F. Harman (Republican) 17.0% |
| Illinois 3 | Marty Russo | Democratic | 1974 | Incumbent re-elected. | ▌ ✓ Marty Russo (Democratic) 64.4%; ▌Richard D. Murphy (Republican) 35.6% |
| Illinois 4 | George M. O'Brien | Republican | 1972 | Incumbent re-elected. | ▌ ✓ George M. O'Brien (Republican) 64.0%; ▌Dennis E. Marlow (Democratic) 36.0% |
| Illinois 5 | Bill Lipinski | Democratic | 1982 | Incumbent re-elected. | ▌ ✓ Bill Lipinski (Democratic) 63.6%; ▌John M. Paczkowski (Republican) 36.4% |
| Illinois 6 | Henry Hyde | Republican | 1974 | Incumbent re-elected. | ▌ ✓ Henry Hyde (Republican) 75.1%; ▌Robert H. Renshaw (Democratic) 24.9% |
| Illinois 7 | Cardiss Collins | Democratic | 1973 (special) | Incumbent re-elected. | ▌ ✓ Cardiss Collins (Democratic) 78.4%; ▌James Bevel (Republican) 21.6% |
| Illinois 8 | Dan Rostenkowski | Democratic | 1958 | Incumbent re-elected. | ▌ ✓ Dan Rostenkowski (Democratic) 71.3%; ▌Spiro F. Georgeson (Republican) 28.7% |
| Illinois 9 | Sidney R. Yates | Democratic | 1948; 1962 (retired); 1964 | Incumbent re-elected. | ▌ ✓ Sidney R. Yates (Democratic) 67.5%; ▌Herbert Sohn (Republican) 32.5% |
| Illinois 10 | John Porter | Republican | 1980 | Incumbent re-elected. | ▌ ✓ John Porter (Republican) 72.6%; ▌Ruth C. Braver (Democratic) 27.4% |
| Illinois 11 | Frank Annunzio | Democratic | 1964 | Incumbent re-elected. | ▌ ✓ Frank Annunzio (Democratic) 62.6%; ▌Charles J. Theusch (Republican) 37.4% |
| Illinois 12 | Phil Crane | Republican | 1969 (special) | Incumbent re-elected. | ▌ ✓ Phil Crane (Republican) 77.8%; ▌Edward J. LaFlamme (Democratic) 22.2% |
| Illinois 13 | John N. Erlenborn | Republican | 1964 | Incumbent retired. Republican hold. | ▌ ✓ Harris Fawell (Republican) 67.0%; ▌Michael J. Donohue (Democratic) 33.0% |
| Illinois 14 | Tom Corcoran | Republican | 1976 | Incumbent retired to run for U.S. Senator. Republican hold. | ▌ ✓ John E. Grotberg (Republican) 62.2%; ▌Dan McGrath (Democratic) 37.8% |
| Illinois 15 | Ed Madigan | Republican | 1972 | Incumbent re-elected. | ▌ ✓ Ed Madigan (Republican) 73.2%; ▌John M. Hoffmann (Democratic) 26.8% |
| Illinois 16 | Lynn M. Martin | Republican | 1980 | Incumbent re-elected. | ▌ ✓ Lynn M. Martin (Republican) 58.4%; ▌Skip Schwerdtfeger (Democratic) 41.6% |
| Illinois 17 | Lane Evans | Democratic | 1982 | Incumbent re-elected. | ▌ ✓ Lane Evans (Democratic) 56.7%; ▌Kenneth G. McMillan (Republican) 43.3% |
| Illinois 18 | Robert H. Michel | Republican | 1956 | Incumbent re-elected. | ▌ ✓ Robert H. Michel (Republican) 61.1%; ▌Gerald A. Bradley (Democratic) 38.9% |
| Illinois 19 | Dan Crane | Republican | 1978 | Incumbent lost re-election. Democratic gain. | ▌ ✓ Terry L. Bruce (Democratic) 52.3%; ▌Dan Crane (Republican) 47.7% |
| Illinois 20 | Dick Durbin | Democratic | 1982 | Incumbent re-elected. | ▌ ✓ Dick Durbin (Democratic) 61.3%; ▌Richard G. Austin (Republican) 38.7% |
| Illinois 21 | Melvin Price | Democratic | 1944 | Incumbent re-elected. | ▌ ✓ Melvin Price (Democratic) 60.2%; ▌Bob Gaffner (Republican) 39.8% |
| Illinois 22 | Paul Simon | Democratic | 1974 | Incumbent retired to run for U.S. Senator. Democratic hold. | ▌ ✓ Kenneth J. Gray (Democratic) 50.3%; ▌Randy Patchett (Republican) 49.7% |

== Indiana ==
| District | Incumbent | | | This race | |
| District | Representative | Party | First elected | Results | Candidates |
|---|---|---|---|---|---|
| Indiana 1 | Katie Hall | Democratic | 1982 | Incumbent lost renomination. Democratic hold. | ▌ ✓ Pete Visclosky (Democratic) 70.7%; ▌Joseph P. Grenchik (Republican) 28.8%; ▌James Elliott Willis (Libertarian) 0.5% |
| Indiana 2 | Philip Sharp | Democratic | 1974 | Incumbent re-elected. | ▌ ✓ Philip Sharp (Democratic) 53.4%; ▌Ken Mackenzie (Republican) 46.3%; ▌Cecil Bohanon (Libertarian) 0.3% |
| Indiana 3 | John P. Hiler | Republican | 1980 | Incumbent re-elected. | ▌ ✓ John P. Hiler (Republican) 52.4%; ▌Michael P. Barnes (Democratic) 47.3%; ▌Robert Allen Lutton (Libertarian) 0.3% |
| Indiana 4 | Dan Coats | Republican | 1980 | Incumbent re-elected. | ▌ ✓ Dan Coats (Republican) 60.8%; ▌Michael H. Barnard (Democratic) 38.5%; Others: ▌John B. Cameron Jr. (American) 0.4%; ▌Joseph F. Laiacona (Libertarian) 0.3% |
| Indiana 5 | Elwood Hillis | Republican | 1970 | Incumbent re-elected. | ▌ ✓ Elwood Hillis (Republican) 67.9%; ▌Allen B. Maxwell (Democratic) 31.5%; ▌David E. Osterfeld (Libertarian) 0.6% |
| Indiana 6 | Dan Burton | Republican | 1982 | Incumbent re-elected. | ▌ ✓ Dan Burton (Republican) 72.7%; ▌Howard O. Campbell (Democratic) 26.8%; ▌Linda Dilk (Libertarian) 0.5% |
| Indiana 7 | John T. Myers | Republican | 1966 | Incumbent re-elected. | ▌ ✓ John T. Myers (Republican) 67.3%; ▌Arthur E. Smith (Democratic) 31.5%; ▌Barbara L. J. Bourland (Libertarian) 1.3% |
| Indiana 8 | Frank McCloskey | Democratic | 1982 | Incumbent re-elected. | ▌ ✓ Frank McCloskey (Democratic) 49.8%; ▌Richard D. McIntyre (Republican) 49.8%; ▌Michael J. Fallahay (Libertarian) 0.3% |
| Indiana 9 | Lee Hamilton | Democratic | 1964 | Incumbent re-elected. | ▌ ✓ Lee Hamilton (Democratic) 65.1%; ▌Floyd Coates (Republican) 34.5%; ▌Douglas S. Boggs (Libertarian) 0.3% |
| Indiana 10 | Andrew Jacobs Jr. | Democratic | 1964; 1972 (lost); 1974 | Incumbent re-elected. | ▌ ✓ Andrew Jacobs Jr. (Democratic) 59.0%; ▌Joseph P. Watkins (Republican) 40.6%; ▌Bradford L. Warren (Libertarian) 0.4% |

== Iowa ==
| District | Incumbent | | | This race | |
| District | Representative | Party | First elected | Results | Candidates |
|---|---|---|---|---|---|
| Iowa 1 | Jim Leach | Republican | 1976 | Incumbent re-elected. | ▌ ✓ Jim Leach (Republican) 66.8%; ▌Kevin Ready (Democratic) 33.2% |
| Iowa 2 | Tom Tauke | Republican | 1978 | Incumbent re-elected. | ▌ ✓ Tom Tauke (Republican) 63.9%; ▌Joe Welsh (Democratic) 36.1% |
| Iowa 3 | T. Cooper Evans | Republican | 1980 | Incumbent re-elected. | ▌ ✓ T. Cooper Evans (Republican) 60.7%; ▌Joe Johnston (Democratic) 39.3% |
| Iowa 4 | Neal Smith | Democratic | 1958 | Incumbent re-elected. | ▌ ✓ Neal Smith (Democratic) 60.7%; ▌Robert R. Lockard (Republican) 39.3% |
| Iowa 5 | Tom Harkin | Democratic | 1974 | Incumbent retired to run for U.S. Senator. Republican gain. | ▌ ✓ Jim Ross Lightfoot (Republican) 50.8%; ▌Jerry Fitzgerald (Democratic) 49.2% |
| Iowa 6 | Berkley Bedell | Democratic | 1974 | Incumbent re-elected. | ▌ ✓ Berkley Bedell (Democratic) 62.0%; ▌Darrel Resink (Republican) 38.0% |

== Kansas ==
| District | Incumbent | | | This race | |
| District | Representative | Party | First elected | Results | Candidates |
|---|---|---|---|---|---|
| Kansas 1 | Pat Roberts | Republican | 1980 | Incumbent re-elected. | ▌ ✓ Pat Roberts (Republican) 75.9%; ▌Darrel T. Ringer (Democratic) 23.3%; ▌Clement Scoggin (Prohibition) 0.9% |
| Kansas 2 | Jim Slattery | Democratic | 1982 | Incumbent re-elected. | ▌ ✓ Jim Slattery (Democratic) 60.0%; ▌Jim Van Slyke (Republican) 39.1%; ▌Ken Peterson (Prohibition) 0.9% |
| Kansas 3 | Larry Winn | Republican | 1966 | Incumbent retired. Republican hold. | ▌ ✓ Jan Meyers (Republican) 54.8%; ▌Jack Reardon (Democratic) 39.9%; ▌John S. Ralph Jr. (Libertarian) 5.3% |
| Kansas 4 | Dan Glickman | Democratic | 1976 | Incumbent re-elected. | ▌ ✓ Dan Glickman (Democratic) 74.4%; ▌William V. Krause (Republican) 25.6% |
| Kansas 5 | Bob Whittaker | Republican | 1978 | Incumbent re-elected. | ▌ ✓ Bob Whittaker (Republican) 73.5%; ▌John A. Barnes (Democratic) 25.2%; ▌Vearl A. Bacon (Prohibition) 1.2% |

== Kentucky ==
| District | Incumbent | | | This race | |
| District | Representative | Party | First elected | Results | Candidates |
|---|---|---|---|---|---|
| Kentucky 1 | Carroll Hubbard | Democratic | 1974 | Incumbent re-elected. | ▌ ✓ Carroll Hubbard (Democratic) Uncontested |
| Kentucky 2 | William Natcher | Democratic | 1953 (special) | Incumbent re-elected. | ▌ ✓ William Natcher (Democratic) 62.1%; ▌Timothy A. Morrison (Republican) 37.9% |
| Kentucky 3 | Ron Mazzoli | Democratic | 1970 | Incumbent re-elected. | ▌ ✓ Ron Mazzoli (Democratic) 67.7%; ▌Suzanne M. Warner (Republican) 31.7%; ▌Peggy Kreiner (Socialist Workers) 0.6% |
| Kentucky 4 | Gene Snyder | Republican | 1962; 1964 (lost); 1966 | Incumbent re-elected. | ▌ ✓ Gene Snyder (Republican) 53.7%; ▌William Patrick Mulloy II (Democratic) 46.3% |
| Kentucky 5 | Hal Rogers | Republican | 1980 | Incumbent re-elected. | ▌ ✓ Hal Rogers (Republican) 75.9%; ▌Sherman Wilson McIntosh (Democratic) 24.1% |
| Kentucky 6 | Larry J. Hopkins | Republican | 1978 | Incumbent re-elected. | ▌ ✓ Larry J. Hopkins (Republican) 71.4%; ▌Jerry Hammond (Democratic) 28.0%; ▌Tom Suruda (Libertarian) 0.5% |
| Kentucky 7 | Carl D. Perkins | Democratic | 1948 | Incumbent died. Democratic hold. | ▌ ✓ Chris Perkins (Democratic) 73.7%; ▌Aub Russell (Republican) 26.3% |

== Louisiana ==
Livingston, Boggs, Moore, Breaux and Long were re-elected when they received more than 50% of the vote in the Sept. 29 jungle primaries. Tauzin, Breaux and Huckaby were automatically re-elected without having to appear on a ballot.

| District | Incumbent | | | This race | |
| District | Representative | Party | First elected | Results | Candidates |
|---|---|---|---|---|---|
| Louisiana 1 | Bob Livingston | Republican | 1977 (special) | Incumbent re-elected. | ▌ ✓ Bob Livingston (Republican) 87.7%; ▌John B. Levy (Democratic) 8.0%; ▌Kevin Curley (Democratic) 4.3% |
| Louisiana 2 | Lindy Boggs | Democratic | 1973 (special) | Incumbent re-elected. | ▌ ✓ Lindy Boggs (Democratic) 60.1%; ▌Israel M. Augustine Jr. (Democratic) 38.6%; Others: ▌Derrick Morrison (Independent) 0.5%; ▌Bert Lodrig (Democratic) 0.4%; ▌Richard Torregano (Democratic) 0.4% |
| Louisiana 3 | Billy Tauzin | Democratic | 1980 | Incumbent re-elected. | ▌ ✓ Billy Tauzin (Democratic) Uncontested |
| Louisiana 4 | Buddy Roemer | Democratic | 1980 | Incumbent re-elected. | ▌ ✓ Buddy Roemer (Democratic) Uncontested |
| Louisiana 5 | Jerry Huckaby | Democratic | 1976 | Incumbent re-elected. | ▌ ✓ Jerry Huckaby (Democratic) Uncontested |
| Louisiana 6 | Henson Moore | Republican | 1974 | Incumbent re-elected. | ▌ ✓ Henson Moore (Republican) 78.1%; ▌Herb Rotheschild (Democratic) 21.9% |
| Louisiana 7 | John Breaux | Democratic | 1972 | Incumbent re-elected. | ▌ ✓ John Breaux (Democratic) 86.2%; ▌Johnny Myers (Democratic) 13.8% |
| Louisiana 8 | Gillis William Long | Democratic | 1962; 1964 (lost renomination); 1972 | Incumbent re-elected. | ▌ ✓ Gillis William Long (Democratic) 78.0%; ▌Darrell Williamson (Democratic) 22.0% |

== Maine ==
| District | Incumbent | | | This race | |
| District | Representative | Party | First elected | Results | Candidates |
|---|---|---|---|---|---|
| Maine 1 | Jock McKernan | Republican | 1982 | Incumbent re-elected. | ▌ ✓ Jock McKernan (Republican) 63.5%; ▌Barry J. Hobbins (Democratic) 36.5% |
| Maine 2 | Olympia Snowe | Republican | 1978 | Incumbent re-elected. | ▌ ✓ Olympia Snowe (Republican) 75.7%; ▌Chipman C. Bull (Democratic) 22.6%; ▌Kenneth E. Stoddard (Constitution) 1.7% |

== Maryland ==
| District | Incumbent | | | This race | |
| District | Representative | Party | First elected | Results | Candidates |
|---|---|---|---|---|---|
| Maryland 1 | Roy Dyson | Democratic | 1980 | Incumbent re-elected. | ▌ ✓ Roy Dyson (Democratic) 58.4%; ▌Harlan C. Williams (Republican) 41.6% |
| Maryland 2 | Clarence Long | Democratic | 1962 | Incumbent lost re-election. Republican gain. | ▌ ✓ Helen Delich Bentley (Republican) 51.4%; ▌Clarence Long (Democratic) 48.6% |
| Maryland 3 | Barbara Mikulski | Democratic | 1976 | Incumbent re-elected. | ▌ ✓ Barbara Mikulski (Democratic) 68.2%; ▌Ross Z. Pierpont (Republican) 30.5%; ▌Lawrence K. Freeman (Independent) 1.3% |
| Maryland 4 | Marjorie Holt | Republican | 1972 | Incumbent re-elected. | ▌ ✓ Marjorie Holt (Republican) 66.2%; ▌Howard M. Greenebaum (Democratic) 33.8% |
| Maryland 5 | Steny Hoyer | Democratic | 1981 | Incumbent re-elected. | ▌ ✓ Steny Hoyer (Democratic) 72.2%; ▌John E. Ritchie (Republican) 27.8% |
| Maryland 6 | Beverly Byron | Democratic | 1978 | Incumbent re-elected. | ▌ ✓ Beverly Byron (Democratic) 65.1%; ▌Robin Ficker (Republican) 34.9% |
| Maryland 7 | Parren Mitchell | Democratic | 1970 | Incumbent re-elected. | ▌ ✓ Parren Mitchell (Democratic) 100% |
| Maryland 8 | Michael D. Barnes | Democratic | 1978 | Incumbent re-elected. | ▌ ✓ Michael D. Barnes (Democratic) 71.5%; ▌Albert Ceccone (Republican) 27.8%; ▌Samuel K. Grove (Libertarian) 0.7% |

== Massachusetts ==
| District | Incumbent | | | This race | |
| District | Representative | Party | First elected | Results | Candidates |
|---|---|---|---|---|---|
| Massachusetts 1 | Silvio O. Conte | Republican | 1958 | Incumbent re-elected. | ▌ ✓ Silvio O. Conte (Republican) 72.9%; ▌Mary L. Wentworth (Democratic) 27.1% |
| Massachusetts 2 | Edward Boland | Democratic | 1952 | Incumbent re-elected. | ▌ ✓ Edward Boland (Democratic) 68.7%; ▌Thomas P. Swank (Republican) 31.3% |
| Massachusetts 3 | Joseph D. Early | Democratic | 1974 | Incumbent re-elected. | ▌ ✓ Joseph D. Early (Democratic) 67.4%; ▌Kenneth J. Redding (Republican) 32.6% |
| Massachusetts 4 | Barney Frank | Democratic | 1980 | Incumbent re-elected. | ▌ ✓ Barney Frank (Democratic) 74.2%; ▌Jim Forte (Republican) 25.8% |
| Massachusetts 5 | James Shannon | Democratic | 1978 | Incumbent retired to run for U.S. Senator. Democratic hold. | ▌ ✓ Chester G. Atkins (Democratic) 53.4%; ▌Greg Hyatt (Republican) 46.6% |
| Massachusetts 6 | Nicholas Mavroules | Democratic | 1978 | Incumbent re-elected. | ▌ ✓ Nicholas Mavroules (Democratic) 70.4%; ▌Frederick S. Leber (Republican) 26.4%; ▌Donald Batchelder (Independent) 3.2% |
| Massachusetts 7 | Ed Markey | Democratic | 1976 | Incumbent re-elected. | ▌ ✓ Ed Markey (Democratic) 71.4%; ▌S. Lester Ralph (Republican) 28.6% |
| Massachusetts 8 | Tip O'Neill | Democratic | 1952 | Incumbent re-elected. | ▌ ✓ Tip O'Neill (Democratic) 91.9%; ▌Laura Ross (Communist) 8.1% |
| Massachusetts 9 | Joe Moakley | Democratic | 1972 | Incumbent re-elected. | ▌ ✓ Joe Moakley (Democratic) 99.9% |
| Massachusetts 10 | Gerry Studds | Democratic | 1972 | Incumbent re-elected. | ▌ ✓ Gerry Studds (Democratic) 55.7%; ▌Lewis Crampton (Republican) 44.3% |
| Massachusetts 11 | Brian J. Donnelly | Democratic | 1978 | Incumbent re-elected. | ▌ ✓ Brian J. Donnelly (Democratic) 100% |

== Michigan ==
| District | Incumbent | | | This race | |
| District | Representative | Party | First elected | Results | Candidates |
|---|---|---|---|---|---|
| Michigan 1 | John Conyers | Democratic | 1964 | Incumbent re-elected. | ▌ ✓ John Conyers (Democratic) 89.4%; ▌Edward J. Mack (Republican) 10.2%; ▌Andrew Pulley (Socialist Workers) 0.4% |
| Michigan 2 | Carl Pursell | Republican | 1976 | Incumbent re-elected. | ▌ ✓ Carl Pursell (Republican) 68.6%; ▌Mike McCauley (Democratic) 30.4%; Others: ▌Greg Severance (Independent) 0.5%; ▌James L. Hudler (Libertarian) 0.5% |
| Michigan 3 | Howard Wolpe | Democratic | 1978 | Incumbent re-elected. | ▌ ✓ Howard Wolpe (Democratic) 52.9%; ▌Jackie McGregor (Republican) 47.1% |
| Michigan 4 | Mark D. Siljander | Republican | 1981 | Incumbent re-elected. | ▌ ✓ Mark D. Siljander (Republican) 66.9%; ▌Charles S. Rodebaugh (Democratic) 33.1% |
| Michigan 5 | Harold S. Sawyer | Republican | 1976 | Incumbent retired. Republican hold. | ▌ ✓ Paul B. Henry (Republican) 61.8%; ▌Gary J. McInerney (Democratic) 37.6%; ▌Richard Whitelock (Libertarian) 0.6% |
| Michigan 6 | Bob Carr | Democratic | 1974; 1980 (defeated); 1982 | Incumbent re-elected. | ▌ ✓ Bob Carr (Democratic) 52.4%; ▌Tom Ritter (Republican) 46.7%; Others: ▌Russell Severance (Independent) 0.5%; ▌James E. Hurrell (Libertarian) 0.4% |
| Michigan 7 | Dale Kildee | Democratic | 1976 | Incumbent re-elected. | ▌ ✓ Dale Kildee (Democratic) 93.2%; ▌Samuel Johnson Jr. (Independent) 6.8% |
| Michigan 8 | J. Bob Traxler | Democratic | 1974 | Incumbent re-elected. | ▌ ✓ J. Bob Traxler (Democratic) 64.4%; ▌John Heussner (Republican) 35.6% |
| Michigan 9 | Guy Vander Jagt | Republican | 1966 | Incumbent re-elected. | ▌ ✓ Guy Vander Jagt (Republican) 70.9%; ▌John Michael Senger (Democratic) 28.8%; ▌Nicholas Hamilton (Libertarian) 0.3% |
| Michigan 10 | Donald J. Albosta | Democratic | 1978 | Incumbent lost re-election. Republican gain. | ▌ ✓ Bill Schuette (Republican) 50.1%; ▌Donald J. Albosta (Democratic) 49.4%; ▌George Leef (Libertarian) 0.5% |
| Michigan 11 | Bob Davis | Republican | 1978 | Incumbent re-elected. | ▌ ✓ Bob Davis (Republican) 58.6%; ▌Tom Stewart (Democratic) 41.4% |
| Michigan 12 | David Bonior | Democratic | 1976 | Incumbent re-elected. | ▌ ✓ David Bonior (Democratic) 58.3%; ▌Eugene J. Tyza (Republican) 40.9%; ▌Keith P. Edwards (Libertarian) 0.7% |
| Michigan 13 | George Crockett Jr. | Democratic | 1980 | Incumbent re-elected. | ▌ ✓ George Crockett Jr. (Democratic) 86.6%; ▌Robert Murphy (Republican) 13.4% |
| Michigan 14 | Dennis Hertel | Democratic | 1980 | Incumbent re-elected. | ▌ ✓ Dennis Hertel (Democratic) 59.1%; ▌John Lauve (Republican) 40.3%; ▌Virginia L. Cropsey (Libertarian) 0.6% |
| Michigan 15 | William D. Ford | Democratic | 1964 | Incumbent re-elected. | ▌ ✓ William D. Ford (Democratic) 59.9%; ▌Gerald R. Carlson (Republican) 40.1% |
| Michigan 16 | John Dingell | Democratic | 1955 (special) | Incumbent re-elected. | ▌ ✓ John Dingell (Democratic) 63.7%; ▌Frank Grzywacki (Republican) 35.7%; ▌Donald Kostyu (Libertarian) 0.5% |
| Michigan 17 | Sander Levin | Democratic | 1982 | Incumbent re-elected. | ▌ ✓ Sander Levin (Democratic) 100% |
| Michigan 18 | William Broomfield | Republican | 1956 | Incumbent re-elected. | ▌ ✓ William Broomfield (Republican) 79.4%; ▌Vivian H. Smargon (Democratic) 19.7%; ▌Timothy J. O'Brien (Libertarian) 0.9% |

== Minnesota ==
| District | Incumbent | | | This race | |
| District | Representative | Party | First elected | Results | Candidates |
|---|---|---|---|---|---|
| Minnesota 1 | Tim Penny | DFL | 1982 | Incumbent re-elected. | ▌ ✓ Tim Penny (DFL) 57.0%; ▌Keith Spicer (Ind.-Republican) 43.0% |
| Minnesota 2 | Vin Weber | Independent- Republican | 1980 | Incumbent re-elected. | ▌ ✓ Vin Weber (Ind.-Republican) 63.1%; ▌Todd Lundquist (DFL) 36.9% |
| Minnesota 3 | Bill Frenzel | Independent- Republican | 1970 | Incumbent re-elected. | ▌ ✓ Bill Frenzel (Ind.-Republican) 73.2%; ▌Dave Peterson (DFL) 26.8% |
| Minnesota 4 | Bruce Vento | DFL | 1976 | Incumbent re-elected. | ▌ ✓ Bruce Vento (DFL) 73.5%; ▌Mary Jane Rachner (Ind.-Republican) 25.2%; ▌Peter Brandli (Socialist Workers) 1.3% |
| Minnesota 5 | Martin Olav Sabo | DFL | 1978 | Incumbent re-elected. | ▌ ✓ Martin Olav Sabo (DFL) 70.1%; ▌Richard D. Weiblen (Ind.-Republican) 26.6%; ▌Kathryn Anderson (Citizens) 3.3% |
| Minnesota 6 | Gerry Sikorski | DFL | 1982 | Incumbent re-elected. | ▌ ✓ Gerry Sikorski (DFL) 60.5%; ▌Patrick Trueman (Ind.-Republican) 39.5% |
| Minnesota 7 | Arlan Stangeland | Independent- Republican | 1977 | Incumbent re-elected. | ▌ ✓ Arlan Stangeland (Ind.-Republican) 57.0%; ▌Collin Peterson (DFL) 43.0% |
| Minnesota 8 | Jim Oberstar | DFL | 1974 | Incumbent re-elected. | ▌ ✓ Jim Oberstar (DFL) 67.2%; ▌Dave Rued (Ind.-Republican) 32.1%; ▌David Salner (Socialist Workers) 0.6% |

== Mississippi ==
| District | Incumbent | | | This race | |
| District | Representative | Party | First elected | Results | Candidates |
|---|---|---|---|---|---|
| Mississippi 1 | Jamie Whitten | Democratic | 1941 | Incumbent re-elected. | ▌ ✓ Jamie Whitten (Democratic) 88.4%; ▌John Hargett (Independent) 11.6% |
| Mississippi 2 | Webb Franklin | Republican | 1982 | Incumbent re-elected. | ▌ ✓ Webb Franklin (Republican) 50.6%; ▌Robert G. Clark Jr. (Democratic) 48.9%; ▌Hardy Caraway (Independent) 0.5% |
| Mississippi 3 | Sonny Montgomery | Democratic | 1966 | Incumbent re-elected. | ▌ ✓ Sonny Montgomery (Democratic) Uncontested |
| Mississippi 4 | Wayne Dowdy | Democratic | 1981 | Incumbent re-elected. | ▌ ✓ Wayne Dowdy (Democratic) 55.3%; ▌David Armstrong (Republican) 44.7% |
| Mississippi 5 | Trent Lott | Republican | 1972 | Incumbent re-elected. | ▌ ✓ Trent Lott (Republican) 84.7%; ▌Arlon Coate (Democratic) 15.3% |

== Missouri ==
| District | Incumbent | | | This race | |
| District | Representative | Party | First elected | Results | Candidates |
|---|---|---|---|---|---|
| Missouri 1 | Bill Clay | Democratic | 1968 | Incumbent re-elected. | ▌ ✓ Bill Clay (Democratic) 68.3%; ▌Eric Rathbone (Republican) 31.7% |
| Missouri 2 | Robert A. Young | Democratic | 1976 | Incumbent re-elected. | ▌ ✓ Robert A. Young (Democratic) 51.8%; ▌John Buechner (Republican) 47.5%; ▌Chad D. Colopy (Libertarian) 0.7% |
| Missouri 3 | Dick Gephardt | Democratic | 1976 | Incumbent re-elected. | ▌ ✓ Dick Gephardt (Democratic) Uncontested |
| Missouri 4 | Ike Skelton | Democratic | 1976 | Incumbent re-elected. | ▌ ✓ Ike Skelton (Democratic) 66.9%; ▌Carl D. Russell (Republican) 33.1% |
| Missouri 5 | Alan Wheat | Democratic | 1982 | Incumbent re-elected. | ▌ ✓ Alan Wheat (Democratic) 66.0%; ▌Jim Kenworthy (Republican) 31.8%; ▌Mike Roberts (Libertarian) 2.2% |
| Missouri 6 | Tom Coleman | Republican | 1976 | Incumbent re-elected. | ▌ ✓ Tom Coleman (Republican) 64.8%; ▌Kenneth C. Hensley (Democratic) 35.2% |
| Missouri 7 | Gene Taylor | Republican | 1972 | Incumbent re-elected. | ▌ ✓ Gene Taylor (Republican) 69.6%; ▌Ken Young (Democratic) 30.4% |
| Missouri 8 | Bill Emerson | Republican | 1980 | Incumbent re-elected. | ▌ ✓ Bill Emerson (Republican) 65.4%; ▌Bill Blue (Democratic) 34.6% |
| Missouri 9 | Harold Volkmer | Democratic | 1976 | Incumbent re-elected. | ▌ ✓ Harold Volkmer (Democratic) 52.9%; ▌Carrie Francke (Republican) 47.1% |

== Montana ==
| District | Incumbent | | | This race | |
| District | Representative | Party | First elected | Results | Candidates |
|---|---|---|---|---|---|
| Montana 1 | Pat Williams | Democratic | 1978 | Incumbent re-elected. | ▌ ✓ Pat Williams (Democratic) 65.6%; ▌Gary K. Carlson (Republican) 31.9%; ▌Royer G. Warren (Libertarian) 2.4% |
| Montana 2 | Ron Marlenee | Republican | 1976 | Incumbent re-elected. | ▌ ✓ Ron Marlenee (Republican) 65.9%; ▌Chet Blaylock (Democratic) 34.1% |

== Nebraska ==
| District | Incumbent | | | This race | |
| District | Representative | Party | First elected | Results | Candidates |
|---|---|---|---|---|---|
| Nebraska 1 | Doug Bereuter | Republican | 1978 | Incumbent re-elected. | ▌ ✓ Doug Bereuter (Republican) 74.1%; ▌Monica Bauer (Democratic) 25.9% |
| Nebraska 2 | Hal Daub | Republican | 1980 | Incumbent re-elected. | ▌ ✓ Hal Daub (Republican) 65.0%; ▌Thomas F. Cavanaugh (Democratic) 35.0% |
| Nebraska 3 | Virginia D. Smith | Republican | 1974 | Incumbent re-elected. | ▌ ✓ Virginia D. Smith (Republican) 83.3%; ▌Tom Vickers (Democratic) 16.7% |

== Nevada ==
| District | Incumbent | | | This race | |
| District | Representative | Party | First elected | Results | Candidates |
|---|---|---|---|---|---|
| Nevada 1 | Harry Reid | Democratic | 1982 | Incumbent re-elected. | ▌ ✓ Harry Reid (Democratic) 56.1%; ▌Peggy Cavnar (Republican) 42.4%; ▌Joe Morris (Libertarian) 1.4% |
| Nevada 2 | Barbara Vucanovich | Republican | 1982 | Incumbent re-elected. | ▌ ✓ Barbara Vucanovich (Republican) 71.2%; ▌Andrew Barbano (Democratic) 25.8%; ▌Dan Becan (Libertarian) 3.0% |

== New Hampshire ==
| District | Incumbent | | | This race | |
| District | Representative | Party | First elected | Results | Candidates |
|---|---|---|---|---|---|
| New Hampshire 1 | Norman D'Amours | Democratic | 1974 | Incumbent retired to run for U.S. Senator. Republican gain. | ▌ ✓ Bob Smith (Republican) 58.6%; ▌Dudley Dudley (Democratic) 40.3%; Others: ▌John G. H. Muelke Jr. (Independent) 0.8%; ▌Arne R. Erickson (Libertarian) 0.3% |
| New Hampshire 2 | Judd Gregg | Republican | 1980 | Incumbent re-elected. | ▌ ✓ Judd Gregg (Republican) 76.2%; ▌Larry Converse (Democratic) 23.2%; ▌Alan S. Groupe (Libertarian) 0.6% |

== New Jersey ==
| District | Incumbent | | | This race | |
| District | Representative | Party | First elected | Results | Candidates |
|---|---|---|---|---|---|
| New Jersey 1 | James Florio | Democratic | 1974 | Incumbent re-elected. | ▌ ✓ James Florio (Democratic) 71.9%; ▌Frederick A. Busch Jr. (Republican) 27.8%; ▌Jerry Zeldin (Libertarian) 0.4% |
| New Jersey 2 | William J. Hughes | Democratic | 1974 | Incumbent re-elected. | ▌ ✓ William J. Hughes (Democratic) 63.2%; ▌Raymond G. Massie (Republican) 36.8% |
| New Jersey 3 | James J. Howard | Democratic | 1964 | Incumbent re-elected. | ▌ ✓ James J. Howard (Democratic) 53.3%; ▌Brian T. Kennedy (Republican) 45.8%; Others: ▌Frank Kurshinski (Christian) 0.5%; ▌Lawrence D. Erickson (Citizens) 0.4% |
| New Jersey 4 | Chris Smith | Republican | 1980 | Incumbent re-elected. | ▌ ✓ Chris Smith (Republican) 61.3%; ▌James C. Hedden (Democratic) 38.7% |
| New Jersey 5 | Marge Roukema | Republican | 1980 | Incumbent re-elected. | ▌ ✓ Marge Roukema (Republican) 71.2%; ▌Rose Brunetto (Democratic) 28.8% |
| New Jersey 6 | Bernard J. Dwyer | Democratic | 1980 | Incumbent re-elected. | ▌ ✓ Bernard J. Dwyer (Democratic) 55.9%; ▌Dennis Adams (Republican) 42.8%; ▌Stephen Friedlander (Libertarian) 1.3% |
| New Jersey 7 | Matt Rinaldo | Republican | 1972 | Incumbent re-elected. | ▌ ✓ Matt Rinaldo (Republican) 74.2%; ▌John F. Feeley (Democratic) 25.4%; ▌Paul Nelson (Libertarian) 0.4% |
| New Jersey 8 | Robert A. Roe | Democratic | 1970 | Incumbent re-elected. | ▌ ✓ Robert A. Roe (Democratic) 62.7%; ▌Marguerite A. Page (Republican) 36.9%; ▌Daniel A. Maiullo Jr. (Libertarian) 0.3% |
| New Jersey 9 | Robert Torricelli | Democratic | 1982 | Incumbent re-elected. | ▌ ✓ Robert Torricelli (Democratic) 62.6%; ▌Neil Romano (Republican) 37.4% |
| New Jersey 10 | Peter W. Rodino | Democratic | 1948 | Incumbent re-elected. | ▌ ✓ Peter W. Rodino (Democratic) 83.7%; ▌Howard E. Berkeley (Republican) 16.3% |
| New Jersey 11 | Joseph Minish | Democratic | 1962 | Incumbent lost re-election. Republican gain. | ▌ ✓ Dean Gallo (Republican) 55.8%; ▌Joseph Minish (Democratic) 44.2% |
| New Jersey 12 | Jim Courter | Republican | 1978 | Incumbent re-elected. | ▌ ✓ Jim Courter (Republican) 65.0%; ▌Peter Bearse (Democratic) 34.3%; ▌Joseph R. Kerr III (Libertarian) 0.7% |
| New Jersey 13 | Edwin B. Forsythe | Republican | 1970 | Incumbent died. Republican hold. | ▌ ✓ Jim Saxton (Republican) 60.7%; ▌James B. Smith (Democratic) 38.4%; Others: ▌Donald L. Smith (Constitution) 0.7%; ▌Bernardo S. Doganiero (Socialist Labor) 0.2% |
| New Jersey 14 | Frank J. Guarini | Democratic | 1978 | Incumbent re-elected. | ▌ ✓ Frank J. Guarini (Democratic) 65.7%; ▌Edward T. Magee (Republican) 33.3%; ▌Herbert H. Shaw (Independent) 1.0% |

== New Mexico ==
| District | Incumbent | | | This race | |
| District | Representative | Party | First elected | Results | Candidates |
|---|---|---|---|---|---|
| New Mexico 1 | Manuel Lujan Jr. | Republican | 1968 | Incumbent re-elected. | ▌ ✓ Manuel Lujan Jr. (Republican) 64.9%; ▌Charles Ted Asbury (Democratic) 34.0%; ▌Stephen P. Curtis (Libertarian) 1.1% |
| New Mexico 2 | Joe Skeen | Republican | 1980 | Incumbent re-elected. | ▌ ✓ Joe Skeen (Republican) 74.3%; ▌Peter R. York (Democratic) 25.7% |
| New Mexico 3 | Bill Richardson | Democratic | 1982 | Incumbent re-elected. | ▌ ✓ Bill Richardson (Democratic) 60.8%; ▌Louis H. Gallegos (Republican) 37.7%; ▌Shirley Machocky Jones (Libertarian) 1.4% |

== New York ==
| District | Incumbent | | | This race | |
| District | Representative | Party | First elected | Results | Candidates |
|---|---|---|---|---|---|
| New York 1 | William Carney | Conservative | 1978 | Incumbent re-elected. | ▌ ✓ William Carney (Conservative/Rep.) 53.1%; ▌George J. Hochbrueckner (Democratic) 46.9% |
| New York 2 | Thomas Downey | Democratic | 1974 | Incumbent re-elected. | ▌ ✓ Thomas Downey (Democratic) 54.7%; ▌Paul Aniboli (Republican) 45.3% |
| New York 3 | Robert J. Mrazek | Democratic | 1982 | Incumbent re-elected. | ▌ ✓ Robert J. Mrazek (Democratic) 51.0%; ▌Robert P. Quinn (Republican) 47.9%; ▌Elizabeth E. Capazzi (Right to Life) 1.1% |
| New York 4 | Norman F. Lent | Republican | 1970 | Incumbent re-elected. | ▌ ✓ Norman F. Lent (Republican) 68.9%; ▌Sheldon Engelhard (Democratic) 29.2%; ▌John J. Dunkle (Right to Life) 1.8% |
| New York 5 | Ray McGrath | Republican | 1980 | Incumbent re-elected. | ▌ ✓ Ray McGrath (Republican) 62.4%; ▌Michael D'Innocenzo (Democratic) 35.3%; ▌Paul F. Callahan (Right to Life) 1.6%; ▌Jack Olchin (Liberal) 0.7% |
| New York 6 | Joseph P. Addabbo | Democratic | 1960 | Incumbent re-elected. | ▌ ✓ Joseph P. Addabbo (Democratic) 82.7%; ▌Philip J. Veltre (Republican) 17.3% |
| New York 7 | Gary Ackerman | Democratic | 1983 | Incumbent re-elected. | ▌ ✓ Gary Ackerman (Democratic) 69.3%; ▌Gustave A. Reifenkugel (Republican) 30.7% |
| New York 8 | James H. Scheuer | Democratic | 1964; 1972 (defeated); 1974 | Incumbent re-elected. | ▌ ✓ James H. Scheuer (Democratic) 62.8%; ▌Robert L. Brandofino (Republican) 37.2% |
| New York 9 | Geraldine Ferraro | Democratic | 1978 | Incumbent retired to run for U S. Vice President. Democratic hold. | ▌ ✓ Thomas J. Manton (Democratic) 52.8%; ▌Serphin R. Maltese (Republican) 47.2% |
| New York 10 | Chuck Schumer | Democratic | 1980 | Incumbent re-elected. | ▌ ✓ Chuck Schumer (Democratic) 72.4%; ▌John H. Fox (Republican) 26.3%; ▌Alfred F. Donohue Jr. (Right to Life) 1.3% |
| New York 11 | Edolphus Towns | Democratic | 1982 | Incumbent re-elected. | ▌ ✓ Edolphus Towns (Democratic) 85.2%; ▌Nathaniel Hendricks (Republican) 13.1%; ▌Alfred Hamel (Conservative) 1.6% |
| New York 12 | Major Owens | Democratic | 1982 | Incumbent re-elected. | ▌ ✓ Major Owens (Democratic) 90.5%; ▌Joseph N. O. Caesar (Republican) 9.5% |
| New York 13 | Stephen Solarz | Democratic | 1974 | Incumbent re-elected. | ▌ ✓ Stephen Solarz (Democratic) 65.9%; ▌Lew Y. Levin (Republican) 34.1% |
| New York 14 | Guy Molinari | Republican | 1980 | Incumbent re-elected. | ▌ ✓ Guy Molinari (Republican) 70.2%; ▌Kevin L. Sheehy (Democratic) 29.8% |
| New York 15 | Bill Green | Republican | 1978 | Incumbent re-elected. | ▌ ✓ Bill Green (Republican) 56.1%; ▌Andrew J. Stein (Democratic) 43.9% |
| New York 16 | Charles Rangel | Democratic | 1970 | Incumbent re-elected. | ▌ ✓ Charles Rangel (Democratic) 97.0%; ▌Michael T. Berns (Conservative) 2.1%; ▌Nan Bailey (Socialist Workers) 0.9% |
| New York 17 | Ted Weiss | Democratic | 1976 | Incumbent re-elected. | ▌ ✓ Ted Weiss (Democratic) 81.5%; ▌Kenneth Katzman (Republican) 16.7%; ▌Leonard Steinman (Conservative) 1.8% |
| New York 18 | Robert García | Democratic | 1978 | Incumbent re-elected. | ▌ ✓ Robert García (Democratic) 89.2%; ▌Curtis Johnson (Republican) 9.3%; ▌John W. Farrell (Conservative) 1.5% |
| New York 19 | Mario Biaggi | Democratic | 1968 | Incumbent re-elected. | ▌ ✓ Mario Biaggi (Democratic) 94.8%; ▌Alice Farrell (Conservative) 5.2% |
| New York 20 | Richard Ottinger | Democratic | 1964; 1970 (retired); 1974 | Incumbent retired. Republican gain. | ▌ ✓ Joe DioGuardi (Republican) 50.1%; ▌Oren J. Teicher (Democratic) 48.2%; ▌Florence T. O'Grady (Right to Life) 1.7% |
| New York 21 | Hamilton Fish IV | Republican | 1968 | Incumbent re-elected. | ▌ ✓ Hamilton Fish IV (Republican) 78.3%; ▌Lawrence W. Grunberger (Democratic) 21.7% |
| New York 22 | Benjamin Gilman | Republican | 1972 | Incumbent re-elected. | ▌ ✓ Benjamin Gilman (Republican) 68.5%; ▌Bruce M. Levine (Democratic) 27.5%; ▌Robert De Maggio (Right to Life) 3.9% |
| New York 23 | Samuel S. Stratton | Democratic | 1958 | Incumbent re-elected. | ▌ ✓ Samuel S. Stratton (Democratic) 77.8%; ▌Frank Wicks (Republican) 21.9%; ▌Richard Ariza (Socialist Workers) 0.3% |
| New York 24 | Gerald Solomon | Republican | 1978 | Incumbent re-elected. | ▌ ✓ Gerald Solomon (Republican) 73.2%; ▌Edward James Bloch (Democratic) 26.8% |
| New York 25 | Sherwood Boehlert | Republican | 1982 | Incumbent re-elected. | ▌ ✓ Sherwood Boehlert (Republican) 72.8%; ▌James J. Ball (Democratic) 27.2% |
| New York 26 | David O'Brien Martin | Republican | 1980 | Incumbent re-elected. | ▌ ✓ David O'Brien Martin (Republican) 70.6%; ▌Bernard J. Lammers (Democratic) 29.4% |
| New York 27 | George C. Wortley | Republican | 1980 | Incumbent re-elected. | ▌ ✓ George C. Wortley (Republican) 56.6%; ▌Thomas C. Buckel Jr. (Democratic) 43.4% |
| New York 28 | Matt McHugh | Democratic | 1974 | Incumbent re-elected. | ▌ ✓ Matt McHugh (Democratic) 56.6%; ▌Constance E. Cook (Republican) 41.4%; ▌Mark R. Masterson (Right to Life) 2.0% |
| New York 29 | Frank Horton | Republican | 1962 | Incumbent re-elected. | ▌ ✓ Frank Horton (Republican) 69.6%; ▌James R. Toole (Democratic) 24.3%; ▌James L. Hale (Conservative) 4.0%; ▌Donald M. Peters (Right to Life) 2.0% |
| New York 30 | Barber Conable | Republican | 1964 | Incumbent retired. Republican hold. | ▌ ✓ Fred J. Eckert (Republican) 54.4%; ▌W. Douglas Call (Democratic) 45.4%; ▌Erskine Nero (Independent) 0.2% |
| New York 31 | Jack Kemp | Republican | 1970 | Incumbent re-elected. | ▌ ✓ Jack Kemp (Republican) 75.0%; ▌Peter J. Martinelli (Democratic) 25.0% |
| New York 32 | John LaFalce | Democratic | 1974 | Incumbent re-elected. | ▌ ✓ John LaFalce (Democratic) 69.4%; ▌Anthony J. Murty (Republican) 30.6% |
| New York 33 | Henry J. Nowak | Democratic | 1974 | Incumbent re-elected. | ▌ ✓ Henry J. Nowak (Democratic) 77.6%; ▌David S. Lewandowski (Republican) 22.4% |
| New York 34 | Stan Lundine | Democratic | 1976 | Incumbent re-elected. | ▌ ✓ Stan Lundine (Democratic) 54.2%; ▌Jill Houghton Emery (Republican) 44.5%; ▌Carol L. Fisher (Right to Life) 1.3% |

== North Carolina ==
| District | Incumbent | | | This race | |
| District | Representative | Party | First elected | Results | Candidates |
|---|---|---|---|---|---|
| North Carolina 1 | Walter B. Jones Sr. | Democratic | 1966 | Incumbent re-elected. | ▌ ✓ Walter B. Jones Sr. (Democratic) 67.1%; ▌Herbert W. Lee (Republican) 32.9% |
| North Carolina 2 | Tim Valentine | Democratic | 1982 | Incumbent re-elected. | ▌ ✓ Tim Valentine (Democratic) 67.7%; ▌Frank H. Hill (Republican) 32.3% |
| North Carolina 3 | Charles O. Whitley | Democratic | 1976 | Incumbent re-elected. | ▌ ✓ Charles O. Whitley (Democratic) 64.1%; ▌Danny G. Moody (Republican) 35.9% |
| North Carolina 4 | Ike Franklin Andrews | Democratic | 1972 | Incumbent lost re-election. Republican gain. | ▌ ✓ Bill Cobey (Republican) 50.6%; ▌Ike Franklin Andrews (Democratic) 49.4% |
| North Carolina 5 | Stephen L. Neal | Democratic | 1974 | Incumbent re-elected. | ▌ ✓ Stephen L. Neal (Democratic) 50.7%; ▌Stuart Epperson (Republican) 49.3% |
| North Carolina 6 | Robin Britt | Democratic | 1982 | Incumbent lost re-election. Republican gain. | ▌ ✓ Howard Coble (Republican) 50.6%; ▌Robin Britt (Democratic) 49.3%; ▌Meryl Lynn Farber (Socialist Workers) 0.1% |
| North Carolina 7 | Charlie Rose | Democratic | 1972 | Incumbent re-elected. | ▌ ✓ Charlie Rose (Democratic) 59.2%; ▌S. Thomas Rhodes (Republican) 40.8% |
| North Carolina 8 | Bill Hefner | Democratic | 1974 | Incumbent re-elected. | ▌ ✓ Bill Hefner (Democratic) 50.9%; ▌Harris D. Blake (Republican) 49.1% |
| North Carolina 9 | James G. Martin | Republican | 1972 | Incumbent retired to run for Governor of North Carolina. Republican hold. | ▌ ✓ Alex McMillan (Republican) 50.1%; ▌D. G. Martin (Democratic) 49.9% |
| North Carolina 10 | Jim Broyhill | Republican | 1962 | Incumbent re-elected. | ▌ ✓ Jim Broyhill (Republican) 73.4%; ▌Ted A. Poovey (Democratic) 26.6% |
| North Carolina 11 | Jamie Clarke | Democratic | 1982 | Incumbent lost re-election. Republican gain. | ▌ ✓ Bill Hendon (Republican) 51.0%; ▌Jamie Clarke (Democratic) 49.0% |

== North Dakota ==
| District | Incumbent | | | This race | |
| District | Representative | Party | First elected | Results | Candidates |
|---|---|---|---|---|---|
| North Dakota at-large | Byron Dorgan | Democratic-NPL | 1980 | Incumbent re-elected. | ▌ ✓ Byron Dorgan (Democratic-NPL) 78.7%; ▌Lois Ivers Altenburg (Republican) 21.3% |

== Ohio ==
| District | Incumbent | | | This race | |
| District | Representative | Party | First elected | Results | Candidates |
|---|---|---|---|---|---|
| Ohio 1 | Tom Luken | Democratic | 1974 (special); 1974 (defeated); 1976 | Incumbent re-elected. | ▌ ✓ Tom Luken (Democratic) 55.1%; ▌Norman Murdock (Republican) 40.3% |
| Ohio 2 | Bill Gradison | Republican | 1974 | Incumbent re-elected. | ▌ ✓ Bill Gradison (Republican) 68.6%; ▌Thomas J. Porter (Democratic) 31.4% |
| Ohio 3 | Tony P. Hall | Democratic | 1978 | Incumbent re-elected. | ▌ ✓ Tony P. Hall (Democratic) Uncontested |
| Ohio 4 | Mike Oxley | Republican | 1972 | Incumbent re-elected. | ▌ ✓ Mike Oxley (Republican) 77.5%; ▌William O. Sutton (Democratic) 22.5% |
| Ohio 5 | Del Latta | Republican | 1958 | Incumbent re-elected. | ▌ ✓ Del Latta (Republican) 62.7%; ▌James R. Sherck (Democratic) 37.3% |
| Ohio 6 | Bob McEwen | Republican | 1980 | Incumbent re-elected. | ▌ ✓ Bob McEwen (Republican) 74.0%; ▌Bob Smith (Democratic) 26.0% |
| Ohio 7 | Mike DeWine | Republican | 1982 | Incumbent re-elected. | ▌ ✓ Mike DeWine (Republican) 76.7%; ▌Donald E. Scott (Democratic) 21.1% |
| Ohio 8 | Tom Kindness | Republican | 1974 | Incumbent re-elected. | ▌ ✓ Tom Kindness (Republican) 76.9%; ▌John T. Francis (Democratic) 23.1% |
| Ohio 9 | Marcy Kaptur | Democratic | 1982 | Incumbent re-elected. | ▌ ✓ Marcy Kaptur (Democratic) 54.9%; ▌Frank Venner (Republican) 43.4% |
| Ohio 10 | Clarence E. Miller | Republican | 1966 | Incumbent re-elected. | ▌ ✓ Clarence E. Miller (Republican) 73.0%; ▌John M. Buchanan (Democratic) 27.0% |
| Ohio 11 | Dennis E. Eckart | Democratic | 1980 | Incumbent re-elected. | ▌ ✓ Dennis E. Eckart (Democratic) 66.8%; ▌Dean Beagle (Republican) 33.2% |
| Ohio 12 | John Kasich | Republican | 1982 | Incumbent re-elected. | ▌ ✓ John Kasich (Republican) 69.5%; ▌Richard S. Sloan (Democratic) 30.5% |
| Ohio 13 | Don Pease | Democratic | 1976 | Incumbent re-elected. | ▌ ✓ Don Pease (Democratic) 66.4%; ▌William G. Schaffner (Republican) 30.0%; ▌James S. Patton (Independent) 3.6% |
| Ohio 14 | John F. Seiberling | Democratic | 1970 | Incumbent re-elected. | ▌ ✓ John F. Seiberling (Democratic) 71.4%; ▌Jean E. Bender (Republican) 28.6% |
| Ohio 15 | Chalmers Wylie | Republican | 1966 | Incumbent re-elected. | ▌ ✓ Chalmers Wylie (Republican) 71.6%; ▌Duane Jager (Democratic) 28.4% |
| Ohio 16 | Ralph Regula | Republican | 1972 | Incumbent re-elected. | ▌ ✓ Ralph Regula (Republican) 72.4%; ▌James Gwin (Democratic) 27.6% |
| Ohio 17 | Lyle Williams | Republican | 1978 | Incumbent lost re-election. Democratic gain. | ▌ ✓ James Traficant (Democratic) 53.3%; ▌Lyle Williams (Republican) 45.7%; ▌Reynold J. Johnjulio (Independent) 1.0% |
| Ohio 18 | Douglas Applegate | Democratic | 1976 | Incumbent re-elected. | ▌ ✓ Douglas Applegate (Democratic) 75.9%; ▌Kenneth P. Burt Jr. (Republican) 24.1% |
| Ohio 19 | Ed Feighan | Democratic | 1982 | Incumbent re-elected. | ▌ ✓ Ed Feighan (Democratic) 55.2%; ▌Matthew J. Hatchadorian (Republican) 42.7%; ▌Arnold Gleisser (Independent) 2.1% |
| Ohio 20 | Mary Rose Oakar | Democratic | 1976 | Incumbent re-elected. | ▌ ✓ Mary Rose Oakar (Democratic) 100% |
| Ohio 21 | Louis Stokes | Democratic | 1968 | Incumbent re-elected. | ▌ ✓ Louis Stokes (Democratic) 82.4%; ▌Robert L. Woodall (Republican) 14.7%; ▌Milton R. Norris (Independent) 2.2%; ▌Omari Musa (Independent) 0.8% |

== Oklahoma ==
| District | Incumbent | | | This race | |
| District | Representative | Party | First elected | Results | Candidates |
|---|---|---|---|---|---|
| Oklahoma 1 | James R. Jones | Democratic | 1972 | Incumbent re-elected. | ▌ ✓ James R. Jones (Democratic) 52.2%; ▌Frank Keating (Republican) 47.3%; ▌D. Lynn Neal (Libertarian) 0.5% |
| Oklahoma 2 | Mike Synar | Democratic | 1978 | Incumbent re-elected. | ▌ ✓ Mike Synar (Democratic) 74.1%; ▌Gary K. Rice (Republican) 25.9% |
| Oklahoma 3 | Wes Watkins | Democratic | 1976 | Incumbent re-elected. | ▌ ✓ Wes Watkins (Democratic) 77.8%; ▌Patrick K. Miller (Republican) 22.2% |
| Oklahoma 4 | Dave McCurdy | Democratic | 1980 | Incumbent re-elected. | ▌ ✓ Dave McCurdy (Democratic) 63.6%; ▌Jerry Smith (Republican) 35.4%; ▌Gordon E. Mobley (Libertarian) 1.0% |
| Oklahoma 5 | Mickey Edwards | Republican | 1976 | Incumbent re-elected. | ▌ ✓ Mickey Edwards (Republican) 75.6%; ▌Allen Greeson (Democratic) 21.9%; ▌D. Frank Robinson (Libertarian) 2.5% |
| Oklahoma 6 | Glenn English | Democratic | 1974 | Incumbent re-elected. | ▌ ✓ Glenn English (Democratic) 58.9%; ▌Craig Dodd (Republican) 41.1% |

== Oregon ==
| District | Incumbent | | | This race | |
| District | Representative | Party | First elected | Results | Candidates |
|---|---|---|---|---|---|
| Oregon 1 | Les AuCoin | Democratic | 1974 | Incumbent re-elected. | ▌ ✓ Les AuCoin (Democratic) 53.1%; ▌Bill Moshofsky (Republican) 46.9% |
| Oregon 2 | Bob Smith | Republican | 1982 | Incumbent re-elected. | ▌ ✓ Bob Smith (Republican) 57.0%; ▌Larryann Willis (Democratic) 43.0% |
| Oregon 3 | Ron Wyden | Democratic | 1980 | Incumbent re-elected. | ▌ ✓ Ron Wyden (Democratic) 72.3%; ▌Drew Davis (Republican) 27.7% |
| Oregon 4 | Jim Weaver | Democratic | 1974 | Incumbent re-elected. | ▌ ✓ Jim Weaver (Democratic) 58.2%; ▌Bruce Long (Republican) 41.8% |
| Oregon 5 | Denny Smith | Republican | 1980 | Incumbent re-elected. | ▌ ✓ Denny Smith (Republican) 54.5%; ▌Ruth McFarland (Democratic) 45.5% |

== Pennsylvania ==
| District | Incumbent | | | This race | |
| District | Representative | Party | First elected | Results | Candidates |
|---|---|---|---|---|---|
| Pennsylvania 1 | Thomas M. Foglietta | Democratic | 1980 | Incumbent re-elected. | ▌ ✓ Thomas M. Foglietta (Democratic) 74.9%; ▌Carmine Di Biase (Republican) 25.1% |
| Pennsylvania 2 | William H. Gray III | Democratic | 1978 | Incumbent re-elected. | ▌ ✓ William H. Gray III (Democratic) 91.0%; ▌Ronald J. Sharper (Republican) 8.3%; ▌Katherine L. Karlin (Socialist Workers) 0.7% |
| Pennsylvania 3 | Robert Borski | Democratic | 1982 | Incumbent re-elected. | ▌ ✓ Robert Borski (Democratic) 63.9%; ▌Flora L. Becker (Republican) 35.7%; ▌John J. Hughes (Independent) 0.3% |
| Pennsylvania 4 | Joe Kolter | Democratic | 1982 | Incumbent re-elected. | ▌ ✓ Joe Kolter (Democratic) 56.8%; ▌Jim Kunder (Republican) 43.2% |
| Pennsylvania 5 | Dick Schulze | Republican | 1974 | Incumbent re-elected. | ▌ ✓ Dick Schulze (Republican) 72.6%; ▌Louis J. Fanti (Democratic) 27.4% |
| Pennsylvania 6 | Gus Yatron | Democratic | 1968 | Incumbent re-elected. | ▌ ✓ Gus Yatron (Democratic) Uncontested |
| Pennsylvania 7 | Bob Edgar | Democratic | 1974 | Incumbent re-elected. | ▌ ✓ Bob Edgar (Democratic) 50.1%; ▌Curt Weldon (Republican) 49.9% |
| Pennsylvania 8 | Peter H. Kostmayer | Democratic | 1976; 1980 (defeated); 1982 | Incumbent re-elected. | ▌ ✓ Peter H. Kostmayer (Democratic) 50.9%; ▌David A. Christian (Republican) 49.1% |
| Pennsylvania 9 | Bud Shuster | Republican | 1972 | Incumbent re-elected. | ▌ ✓ Bud Shuster (Republican) 66.5%; ▌Nancy Kulp (Democratic) 33.5% |
| Pennsylvania 10 | Joseph M. McDade | Republican | 1962 | Incumbent re-elected. | ▌ ✓ Joseph M. McDade (Republican) 77.1%; ▌Gene Basalyga (Democratic) 22.9% |
| Pennsylvania 11 | Frank Harrison | Democratic | 1982 | Incumbent lost renomination. Democratic hold. | ▌ ✓ Paul Kanjorski (Democratic) 58.6%; ▌Robert P. Hudock (Republican) 41.4% |
| Pennsylvania 12 | John Murtha | Democratic | 1974 | Incumbent re-elected. | ▌ ✓ John Murtha (Democratic) 69.1%; ▌Thomas J. Fullard III (Republican) 29.5%; ▌Joseph E. Krill (Independent) 1.4% |
| Pennsylvania 13 | Lawrence Coughlin | Republican | 1968 | Incumbent re-elected. | ▌ ✓ Lawrence Coughlin (Republican) 56.1%; ▌Joe Hoeffel (Democratic) 43.9% |
| Pennsylvania 14 | William J. Coyne | Democratic | 1980 | Incumbent re-elected. | ▌ ✓ William J. Coyne (Democratic) 76.6%; ▌John Robert Clark (Republican) 19.9%; ▌Richard Edward Caligiuri (Libertarian) 3.1%; ▌Alfred Duncan Jr. (Socialist Workers) 0.3% |
| Pennsylvania 15 | Donald L. Ritter | Republican | 1978 | Incumbent re-elected. | ▌ ✓ Donald L. Ritter (Republican) 58.1%; ▌Jane Wells-Schooley (Democratic) 41.9% |
| Pennsylvania 16 | Bob Walker | Republican | 1976 | Incumbent re-elected. | ▌ ✓ Bob Walker (Republican) 77.8%; ▌Martin L. Bard (Democratic) 22.2% |
| Pennsylvania 17 | George Gekas | Republican | 1982 | Incumbent re-elected. | ▌ ✓ George Gekas (Republican) 72.6%; ▌Stephen A. Anderson (Democratic) 27.4% |
| Pennsylvania 18 | Doug Walgren | Democratic | 1976 | Incumbent re-elected. | ▌ ✓ Doug Walgren (Democratic) 62.7%; ▌John G. Maxwell (Republican) 36.7%; ▌Daniel M. Mulholland III (Libertarian) 0.6% |
| Pennsylvania 19 | Bill Goodling | Republican | 1974 | Incumbent re-elected. | ▌ ✓ Bill Goodling (Republican) 75.6%; ▌John Rarig (Democratic) 23.6%; ▌Gary M. Shoemaker (Libertarian) 0.8% |
| Pennsylvania 20 | Joseph M. Gaydos | Democratic | 1968 | Incumbent re-elected. | ▌ ✓ Joseph M. Gaydos (Democratic) 76.0%; ▌Daniel Lloyd (Republican) 24.0% |
| Pennsylvania 21 | Tom Ridge | Republican | 1982 | Incumbent re-elected. | ▌ ✓ Tom Ridge (Republican) 65.4%; ▌James A. Young (Democratic) 34.1%; ▌Edward J. Hammer (Independent) 0.4% |
| Pennsylvania 22 | Austin Murphy | Democratic | 1976 | Incumbent re-elected. | ▌ ✓ Austin Murphy (Democratic) 79.0%; ▌Nancy S. Pryor (Republican) 20.4%; ▌Clare M. Fraenzl (Socialist Workers) 0.6% |
| Pennsylvania 23 | William Clinger | Republican | 1978 | Incumbent re-elected. | ▌ ✓ William Clinger (Republican) 51.6%; ▌Bill Wachob (Democratic) 48.4% |

== Rhode Island ==
| District | Incumbent | | | This race | |
| District | Representative | Party | First elected | Results | Candidates |
|---|---|---|---|---|---|
| Rhode Island 1 | Fernand St Germain | Democratic | 1960 | Incumbent re-elected. | ▌ ✓ Fernand St Germain (Democratic) 68.5%; ▌Alfred R. Rego Jr. (Republican) 31.5% |
| Rhode Island 2 | Claudine Schneider | Republican | 1980 | Incumbent re-elected. | ▌ ✓ Claudine Schneider (Republican) 67.6%; ▌Richard Sinapi (Democratic) 32.4% |

== South Carolina ==
| District | Incumbent | | | This race | |
| District | Representative | Party | First elected | Results | Candidates |
|---|---|---|---|---|---|
| South Carolina 1 | Thomas F. Hartnett | Republican | 1980 | Incumbent re-elected. | ▌ ✓ Thomas F. Hartnett (Republican) 61.7%; ▌Ed Pendarvis (Democratic) 38.3% |
| South Carolina 2 | Floyd Spence | Republican | 1970 | Incumbent re-elected. | ▌ ✓ Floyd Spence (Republican) 62.1%; ▌Ken Mosely (Democratic) 36.7%; ▌Cynthia E. Sullivan (Libertarian) 1.2% |
| South Carolina 3 | Butler Derrick | Democratic | 1974 | Incumbent re-elected. | ▌ ✓ Butler Derrick (Democratic) 58.4%; ▌Clarence E. Taylor (Republican) 40.6%; ▌Robert Madden (Libertarian) 1.0% |
| South Carolina 4 | Carroll Campbell Jr. | Republican | 1978 | Incumbent re-elected. | ▌ ✓ Carroll Campbell Jr. (Republican) 63.9%; ▌Jeff Smith (Democratic) 35.2%; ▌William Ray Pike (Libertarian) 0.9% |
| South Carolina 5 | John Spratt | Democratic | 1982 | Incumbent re-elected. | ▌ ✓ John Spratt (Democratic) 91.8%; ▌Dick Winchester (Republican) 4.3%; ▌Linda Blevins (Libertarian) 3.9% |
| South Carolina 6 | Robin Tallon | Democratic | 1982 | Incumbent re-elected. | ▌ ✓ Robin Tallon (Democratic) 59.9%; ▌Lois Eargle (Republican) 38.8%; ▌Hugh Thompson (Libertarian) 1.3% |

== South Dakota ==
| District | Incumbent | | | This race | |
| District | Representative | Party | First elected | Results | Candidates |
|---|---|---|---|---|---|
| South Dakota at-large | Tom Daschle | Democratic | 1978 | Incumbent re-elected. | ▌ ✓ Tom Daschle (Democratic) 57.4%; ▌Dale Bell (Republican) 42.6% |

== Tennessee ==
| District | Incumbent | | | This race | |
| District | Representative | Party | First elected | Results | Candidates |
|---|---|---|---|---|---|
| Tennessee 1 | Jimmy Quillen | Republican | 1962 | Incumbent re-elected. | ▌ ✓ Jimmy Quillen (Republican) 99.8% |
| Tennessee 2 | John Duncan Sr. | Republican | 1964 | Incumbent re-elected. | ▌ ✓ John Duncan Sr. (Republican) 77.3%; ▌John F. Bowen (Democratic) 22.7% |
| Tennessee 3 | Marilyn Lloyd | Democratic | 1974 | Incumbent re-elected. | ▌ ✓ Marilyn Lloyd (Democratic) 52.4%; ▌John Davis (Republican) 47.6% |
| Tennessee 4 | Jim Cooper | Democratic | 1982 | Incumbent re-elected. | ▌ ✓ Jim Cooper (Democratic) 75.2%; ▌James B. Seigneur (Republican) 24.8% |
| Tennessee 5 | Bill Boner | Democratic | 1978 | Incumbent re-elected. | ▌ ✓ Bill Boner (Democratic) 100% |
| Tennessee 6 | Al Gore | Democratic | 1976 | Incumbent retired to run for U.S. Senator. Democratic hold. | ▌ ✓ Bart Gordon (Democratic) 62.8%; ▌Joe Simpkins (Republican) 37.2% |
| Tennessee 7 | Don Sundquist | Republican | 1982 | Incumbent re-elected. | ▌ ✓ Don Sundquist (Republican) 100% |
| Tennessee 8 | Ed Jones | Democratic | 1969 | Incumbent re-elected. | ▌ ✓ Ed Jones (Democratic) 100% |
| Tennessee 9 | Harold Ford Sr. | Democratic | 1974 | Incumbent re-elected. | ▌ ✓ Harold Ford Sr. (Democratic) 71.5%; ▌William B. Thompson Jr. (Republican) 28.5% |

== Texas ==
| District | Incumbent | | | This race | |
| District | Representative | Party | First elected | Results | Candidates |
|---|---|---|---|---|---|
| Texas 1 | Sam B. Hall Jr. | Democratic | 1976 | Incumbent re-elected. | ▌ ✓ Sam B. Hall Jr. (Democratic) Uncontested |
| Texas 2 | Charles Wilson | Democratic | 1972 | Incumbent re-elected. | ▌ ✓ Charles Wilson (Democratic) 59.3%; ▌Louis Dugas Jr. (Republican) 40.7% |
| Texas 3 | Steve Bartlett | Republican | 1982 | Incumbent re-elected. | ▌ ✓ Steve Bartlett (Republican) 83.0%; ▌Jim Westbrook (Democratic) 17.0% |
| Texas 4 | Ralph Hall | Democratic | 1980 | Incumbent re-elected. | ▌ ✓ Ralph Hall (Democratic) 58.0%; ▌Thomas Blow (Republican) 42.0% |
| Texas 5 | John Bryant | Democratic | 1982 | Incumbent re-elected. | ▌ ✓ John Bryant (Democratic) Uncontested |
| Texas 6 | Phil Gramm | Republican | 1978 (Note: Gramm was first elected as a Democrat. He resigned from his seat in 1983 to run as a Republican.); 1983 (resigned); 1983 (special) | Incumbent retired to run for U.S. Senator. Republican hold. | ▌ ✓ Joe Barton (Republican) 56.6%; ▌Dan Kubiak (Democratic) 43.4% |
| Texas 7 | Bill Archer | Republican | 1970 | Incumbent re-elected. | ▌ ✓ Bill Archer (Republican) 86.7%; ▌Billy Willibey (Democratic) 13.3% |
| Texas 8 | Jack Fields | Republican | 1980 | Incumbent re-elected. | ▌ ✓ Jack Fields (Republican) 64.6%; ▌Don Buford (Democratic) 35.4% |
| Texas 9 | Jack Brooks | Democratic | 1952 | Incumbent re-elected. | ▌ ✓ Jack Brooks (Democratic) 58.8%; ▌Jim Mahan (Republican) 41.2% |
| Texas 10 | J. J. Pickle | Democratic | 1963 | Incumbent re-elected. | ▌ ✓ J. J. Pickle (Democratic) 99.8% |
| Texas 11 | Marvin Leath | Democratic | 1978 | Incumbent re-elected. | ▌ ✓ Marvin Leath (Democratic) Uncontested |
| Texas 12 | Jim Wright | Democratic | 1954 | Incumbent re-elected. | ▌ ✓ Jim Wright (Democratic) 100% |
| Texas 13 | Jack Hightower | Democratic | 1974 | Incumbent lost re-election. Republican gain. | ▌ ✓ Beau Boulter (Republican) 53.0%; ▌Jack Hightower (Democratic) 47.0% |
| Texas 14 | Bill Patman | Democratic | 1980 | Incumbent lost re-election. Republican gain. | ▌ ✓ Mac Sweeney (Republican) 51.3%; ▌Bill Patman (Democratic) 48.7% |
| Texas 15 | Kika de la Garza | Democratic | 1964 | Incumbent re-elected. | ▌ ✓ Kika de la Garza (Democratic) Uncontested |
| Texas 16 | Ron Coleman | Democratic | 1982 | Incumbent re-elected. | ▌ ✓ Ron Coleman (Democratic) 57.4%; ▌Jack Hammond (Republican) 42.6% |
| Texas 17 | Charles Stenholm | Democratic | 1978 | Incumbent re-elected. | ▌ ✓ Charles Stenholm (Democratic) Uncontested |
| Texas 18 | Mickey Leland | Democratic | 1978 | Incumbent re-elected. | ▌ ✓ Mickey Leland (Democratic) 78.8%; ▌Glen E. Beaman (Republican) 19.0%; ▌Jose Alvarado (Independent) 2.2% |
| Texas 19 | Kent Hance | Democratic | 1978 | Incumbent retired to run for U.S. Senator. Republican gain. | ▌ ✓ Larry Combest (Republican) 58.1%; ▌Don R. Richards (Democratic) 41.9% |
| Texas 20 | Henry B. González | Democratic | 1961 | Incumbent re-elected. | ▌ ✓ Henry B. González (Democratic) Uncontested |
| Texas 21 | Tom Loeffler | Republican | 1978 | Incumbent re-elected. | ▌ ✓ Tom Loeffler (Republican) 80.6%; ▌Joe Sullivan (Democratic) 19.4% |
| Texas 22 | Ron Paul | Republican | 1976 (special); 1976 (defeated); 1978 | Incumbent retired to run for U.S. Senator. Republican hold. | ▌ ✓ Tom DeLay (Republican) 65.3%; ▌Doug Williams (Democratic) 34.7% |
| Texas 23 | Abraham Kazen | Democratic | 1966 | Incumbent lost renomination. Democratic hold. | ▌ ✓ Albert Bustamante (Democratic) Uncontested |
| Texas 24 | Martin Frost | Democratic | 1978 | Incumbent re-elected. | ▌ ✓ Martin Frost (Democratic) 59.5%; ▌Bob Burk (Republican) 40.5% |
| Texas 25 | Michael A. Andrews | Democratic | 1982 | Incumbent re-elected. | ▌ ✓ Michael A. Andrews (Democratic) 64.0%; ▌Jerry E. Patterson (Republican) 36.0% |
| Texas 26 | Tom Vandergriff | Democratic | 1982 | Incumbent lost re-election. Republican gain. | ▌ ✓ Dick Armey (Republican) 51.3%; ▌Tom Vandergriff (Democratic) 48.7% |
| Texas 27 | Solomon Ortiz | Democratic | 1982 | Incumbent re-elected. | ▌ ✓ Solomon Ortiz (Democratic) 63.7%; ▌Richard Moore (Republican) 36.3% |

== Utah ==
| District | Incumbent | | | This race | |
| District | Representative | Party | First elected | Results | Candidates |
|---|---|---|---|---|---|
| Utah 1 | Jim Hansen | Republican | 1980 | Incumbent re-elected. | ▌ ✓ Jim Hansen (Republican) 71.2%; ▌Milt Abrams (Democratic) 28.2%; ▌Willy Marshall (Libertarian) 0.6% |
| Utah 2 | David Daniel Marriott | Republican | 1976 | Incumbent retired to run for Governor of Utah. Republican hold. | ▌ ✓ David Smith Monson (Republican) 49.4%; ▌Frances Farley (Democratic) 49.1%; Others: ▌Hugh A. Butler (Libertarian) 0.7%; ▌James Waters (Independent) 0.4%; ▌MaryEllen Gardner (American) 0.4% |
| Utah 3 | Howard C. Nielson | Republican | 1982 | Incumbent re-elected. | ▌ ✓ Howard C. Nielson (Republican) 74.5%; ▌Bruce R. Baird (Democratic) 25.0%; ▌D. W. Crosby (Libertarian) 0.6% |

== Vermont ==
| District | Incumbent | | | This race | |
| District | Representative | Party | First elected | Results | Candidates |
|---|---|---|---|---|---|
| Vermont at-large | Jim Jeffords | Republican | 1974 | Incumbent re-elected. | ▌ ✓ Jim Jeffords (Republican) 65.5%; ▌Anthony Pollina (Democratic) 26.7%; ▌Jim Hedbor (Libertarian) 4.1%; ▌Peter Diamondstone (Liberty Union) 2.2%; ▌Morris Earle (Independent) 1.5% |

== Virginia ==
| District | Incumbent | | | This race | |
| District | Representative | Party | First elected | Results | Candidates |
|---|---|---|---|---|---|
| Virginia 1 | Herb Bateman | Republican | 1982 | Incumbent re-elected. | ▌ ✓ Herb Bateman (Republican) 59.1%; ▌John McGlennon (Democratic) 39.8%; ▌Eli Green (Independent) 1.1% |
| Virginia 2 | G. William Whitehurst | Republican | 1968 | Incumbent re-elected. | ▌ ✓ G. William Whitehurst (Republican) 99.1% |
| Virginia 3 | Thomas J. Bliley Jr. | Republican | 1980 | Incumbent re-elected. | ▌ ✓ Thomas J. Bliley Jr. (Republican) 85.6%; ▌Roger L. Coffey (Independent) 14.4% |
| Virginia 4 | Norman Sisisky | Democratic | 1982 | Incumbent re-elected. | ▌ ✓ Norman Sisisky (Democratic) 99.9% |
| Virginia 5 | Dan Daniel | Democratic | 1968 | Incumbent re-elected. | ▌ ✓ Dan Daniel (Democratic) 100% |
| Virginia 6 | Jim Olin | Democratic | 1982 | Incumbent re-elected. | ▌ ✓ Jim Olin (Democratic) 53.5%; ▌Ray L. Garland (Republican) 46.5% |
| Virginia 7 | J. Kenneth Robinson | Republican | 1970 | Incumbent retired. Republican hold. | ▌ ✓ D. French Slaughter Jr. (Republican) 56.5%; ▌Lewis M. Costello (Democratic) 40.2%; ▌Bob Frazier (Independent) 3.3% |
| Virginia 8 | Stanford Parris | Republican | 1972; 1974 (defeated); 1980 | Incumbent re-elected. | ▌ ✓ Stanford Parris (Republican) 55.8%; ▌Dick Saslaw (Democratic) 43.4%; ▌Donald W. Carpenter (Independent) 0.8% |
| Virginia 9 | Rick Boucher | Democratic | 1982 | Incumbent re-elected. | ▌ ✓ Rick Boucher (Democratic) 52.0%; ▌Jefferson Stafford (Republican) 48.0% |
| Virginia 10 | Frank Wolf | Republican | 1980 | Incumbent re-elected. | ▌ ✓ Frank Wolf (Republican) 62.5%; ▌John P. Flannery II (Democratic) 37.5% |

== Washington ==
| District | Incumbent | | | This race | |
| District | Representative | Party | First elected | Results | Candidates |
|---|---|---|---|---|---|
| Washington 1 | Joel Pritchard | Republican | 1972 | Incumbent retired. Republican hold. | ▌ ✓ John Miller (Republican) 56.3%; ▌Brock Evans (Democratic) 43.7% |
| Washington 2 | Al Swift | Democratic | 1978 | Incumbent re-elected. | ▌ ✓ Al Swift (Democratic) 58.6%; ▌Jim Klauder (Republican) 38.6%; ▌Gary Franco (Populist) 2.8% |
| Washington 3 | Don Bonker | Democratic | 1974 | Incumbent re-elected. | ▌ ✓ Don Bonker (Democratic) 71.1%; ▌Herb Elder (Republican) 28.9% |
| Washington 4 | Sid Morrison | Republican | 1980 | Incumbent re-elected. | ▌ ✓ Sid Morrison (Republican) 76.1%; ▌Mark Epperson (Democratic) 23.9% |
| Washington 5 | Tom Foley | Democratic | 1964 | Incumbent re-elected. | ▌ ✓ Tom Foley (Democratic) 69.7%; ▌Jack Hebner (Republican) 30.3% |
| Washington 6 | Norm Dicks | Democratic | 1976 | Incumbent re-elected. | ▌ ✓ Norm Dicks (Democratic) 66.1%; ▌Mike Lonergan (Republican) 32.3%; ▌Dan Blachly (Libertarian) 1.6% |
| Washington 7 | Mike Lowry | Democratic | 1978 | Incumbent re-elected. | ▌ ✓ Mike Lowry (Democratic) 70.4%; ▌Bob Dorse (Republican) 28.9%; ▌Mark Manning (Socialist Workers) 0.7% |
| Washington 8 | Rod Chandler | Republican | 1982 | Incumbent re-elected. | ▌ ✓ Rod Chandler (Republican) 62.4%; ▌Bob Lamson (Democratic) 37.6% |

== West Virginia ==
| District | Incumbent | | | This race | |
| District | Representative | Party | First elected | Results | Candidates |
|---|---|---|---|---|---|
| West Virginia 1 | Alan Mollohan | Democratic | 1982 | Incumbent re-elected. | ▌ ✓ Alan Mollohan (Democratic) 54.4%; ▌Jim Altmeyer (Republican) 45.6% |
| West Virginia 2 | Harley O. Staggers Jr. | Democratic | 1982 | Incumbent re-elected. | ▌ ✓ Harley O. Staggers Jr. (Democratic) 56.0%; ▌Cleve Benedict (Republican) 44.0% |
| West Virginia 3 | Bob Wise | Democratic | 1982 | Incumbent re-elected. | ▌ ✓ Bob Wise (Democratic) 67.9%; ▌Peggy Miller (Republican) 32.1% |
| West Virginia 4 | Nick Rahall | Democratic | 1976 | Incumbent re-elected. | ▌ ✓ Nick Rahall (Democratic) 66.7%; ▌Jess T. Shumate (Republican) 33.3% |

== Wisconsin ==
| District | Incumbent | | | This race | |
| District | Member | Party | First elected | Results | Candidates |
|---|---|---|---|---|---|
| Wisconsin 1 | Les Aspin | Democratic | 1970 | Incumbent re-elected. | ▌ ✓ Les Aspin (Democratic) 56.2%; ▌Peter Jansson (Republican) 43.8% |
| Wisconsin 2 | Robert Kastenmeier | Democratic | 1958 | Incumbent re-elected. | ▌ ✓ Robert Kastenmeier (Democratic) 63.7%; ▌Albert Lee Wiley Jr. (Republican) 36.3% |
| Wisconsin 3 | Steve Gunderson | Republican | 1980 | Incumbent re-elected. | ▌ ✓ Steve Gunderson (Republican) 68.4%; ▌Charles F. Dahl (Democratic) 31.6% |
| Wisconsin 4 | Jerry Kleczka | Democratic | 1984 | Incumbent re-elected. | ▌ ✓ Jerry Kleczka (Democratic) 66.6%; ▌Robert V. Nolan (Republican) 32.8%; ▌K. Rick Kissell (Labor) 0.6% |
| Wisconsin 5 | Jim Moody | Democratic | 1982 | Incumbent re-elected. | ▌ ✓ Jim Moody (Democratic) 98.1%; ▌William C. Breihan (Socialist Workers) 1.9% |
| Wisconsin 6 | Tom Petri | Republican | 1979 (special) | Incumbent re-elected. | ▌ ✓ Tom Petri (Republican) 75.8%; ▌David L. Iaquinta (Democratic) 24.2% |
| Wisconsin 7 | Dave Obey | Democratic | 1969 (special) | Incumbent re-elected. | ▌ ✓ Dave Obey (Democratic) 61.2%; ▌Mark G. Michaelsen (Republican) 38.8% |
| Wisconsin 8 | Toby Roth | Republican | 1978 | Incumbent re-elected. | ▌ ✓ Toby Roth (Republican) 67.9%; ▌Paul Willems (Democratic) 30.8%; ▌Gary L. Barnes (Libertarian) 0.8%; ▌Cornelius D. Van Handel (Labor) 0.4% |
| Wisconsin 9 | Jim Sensenbrenner | Republican | 1978 | Incumbent re-elected. | ▌ ✓ Jim Sensenbrenner (Republican) 73.4%; ▌John Krause (Democratic) 26.1%; ▌Stephen K. Hauser (Constitution) 0.5% |

== Wyoming ==
| District | Incumbent | | | This race | |
| District | Representative | Party | First elected | Results | Candidates |
|---|---|---|---|---|---|
| Wyoming at-large | Dick Cheney | Republican | 1978 | Incumbent re-elected. | ▌ ✓ Dick Cheney (Republican) 73.6%; ▌Hugh B. McFadden Jr. (Democratic) 24.4%; ▌Craig Alan McCune (Libertarian) 2.0% |

== Non-voting delegates ==
| District | Incumbent | | | This race | |
| District | Delegate | Party | First elected | Results | Candidates |
|---|---|---|---|---|---|
| American Samoa at-large | Fofō Iosefa Fiti Sunia | Democratic | 1980 | Incumbent re-elected. | ▌ ✓ Fofō Iosefa Fiti Sunia (Democratic) 65.2%; ▌Soli Lumoelogo (Independent) 34.8% |
| District of Columbia at-large | Walter Fauntroy | Democratic | 1970 | Incumbent re-elected. | ▌ ✓ Walter Fauntroy (Democratic) 95.6% |
| Guam at-large | Antonio Borja Won Pat | Democratic | 1972 | Incumbent lost re-election. Republican gain. | ▌ ✓ Ben Blaz (Republican) 50.3%; ▌Antonio Borja Won Pat (Democratic) 49.2% |
| Puerto Rico at-large | Baltasar Corrada del Río | New Progressive/ Democratic | 1976 | Incumbent retired to run for mayor of San Juan. New resident commissioner elected. PPD gain. | ▌ ✓ Jaime Fuster (PPD/Democratic) 48.5%; ▌Nelson Famadas (PNP/Democratic) 45.4%; ▌Francisco Catalá (PIP) 3.8%; ▌Angel Viera Martinez (PRP) 2.3% |
| U.S. Virgin Islands at-large | Ron de Lugo | Democratic | 1972; 1978 (retired); 1980 | Incumbent re-elected. | ▌ ✓ Ron de Lugo (Democratic) 73.6%; ▌Janet Watlington (Independent) 25.6% |

== See also ==
- 1984 United States elections
  - 1984 United States gubernatorial elections
  - 1984 United States presidential election
  - 1984 United States Senate elections
- 98th United States Congress
- 99th United States Congress

== Works cited ==
- Abramson, Paul; Aldrich, John; Rohde, David (1995). Change and Continuity in the 1992 Elections. CQ Press. ISBN 0871878399.
- Federal Elections 84: Election Results for U.S. President, the U.S. Senate, and the U.S. House of Representatives. Washington, D.C.: Federal Election Commission. 1985. pp. 27–118. Archived from the original on November 5, 2021.
