= Mark Curtis (SWP member) =

American Socialist Workers Party member and sex offender

Mark Stanton Curtis (born 1959) is a former member of the Socialist Workers Party (SWP). Curtis was charged with sexually assaulting a 14-year-old girl in 1988. Curtis was defended by the SWP's "Mark Curtis Defense Committee", which claimed that Curtis had been framed by the police due to his politics and his trade union activities. Curtis was convicted. Curtis was released from prison in 1995 and later expelled from the SWP.

== History ==
=== Events of the case ===
After work, Curtis went with his coworkers to a bar, Los Compadres, until 8:30. At 8:45, Curtis made a call from his home. At 8:51, police received a call from an 11-year-old boy that his sister was being sexually assaulted on the porch. Police arrived by 8:52 and arrested Curtis.

The 15-year-old girl, Demetria Morris, said she and her brother were watching television when Curtis knocked on their door asking for directions. According to the girl, Curtis asked her if her parents were home, she said they were not, and he attacked her and attempted to rape her. Unbeknownst to Curtis, however, her brother had called the police, who quickly arrived on the scene.

Curtis claimed that he was stopped at a traffic light when a woman approached him, said she was being followed, and asked for a ride home. Upon arriving at her house, Curtis claims that he accompanied her to the porch, at which point police came from behind, handcuffed him, and pulled down his trousers.

=== Aftermath ===
The SWP claimed that Curtis was arrested, beaten by the police, and framed up for his work in organizing a campaign to defend 17 of his co-workers from Central America who had been seized in an INS raid of the Des Moines meatpacking plant at which they worked.

In 1992, the two police officers who arrested Curtis were found guilty of battery and ordered to pay $11,000 in damages.

In 1993, the Morris family was awarded $80,000 in damages after suing Curtis.

In 1995, Curtis was paroled after serving 8 years of a 25-year sentence in Iowa State Penitentiary. When Craine was released, the SWP declared victory and claimed "worldwide support" for Curtis. The SWP led a celebration under the banner "Mark, welcome back to the class struggle!"

In the late 1990s, Curtis solicited a prostitute, who was in fact an undercover cop. The SWP covered this up, then expelled Curtis from the party in 1999.

== See also ==
- Socialist Workers Party (United States)

== Books ==
- Jayko, Margaret. The Frame-Up of Mark Curtis: A Packinghouse Worker's Fight for Justice. Pathfinder, 1989. ISBN 0-87348-545-9
- McLaughlin, Martin. The Mark Curtis Hoax: How the Socialist Workers Party Tried to Dupe the Labor Movement. Mehring, 1990. ISBN 0-929087-46-1
- Gaige, John. The Stakes in the Worldwide Political Campaign to Defend Mark Curtis. Mark Curtis Defense Committee, 1991.
- Crane, Naomi. Why Is Mark Curtis Still in Prison?: The Political Frame-Up of a Unionist and Socialist and the Campaign to Free Him. Pathfinder, 1995. ISBN 0-87348-806-7
- Crane, Naomi. A Packinghouse Worker's Fight for Justice: The Mark Curtis Story. Pathfinder, 1996. ISBN 9780873488440
