= 1984 United States Senate election in Texas =

- November 6, 1984
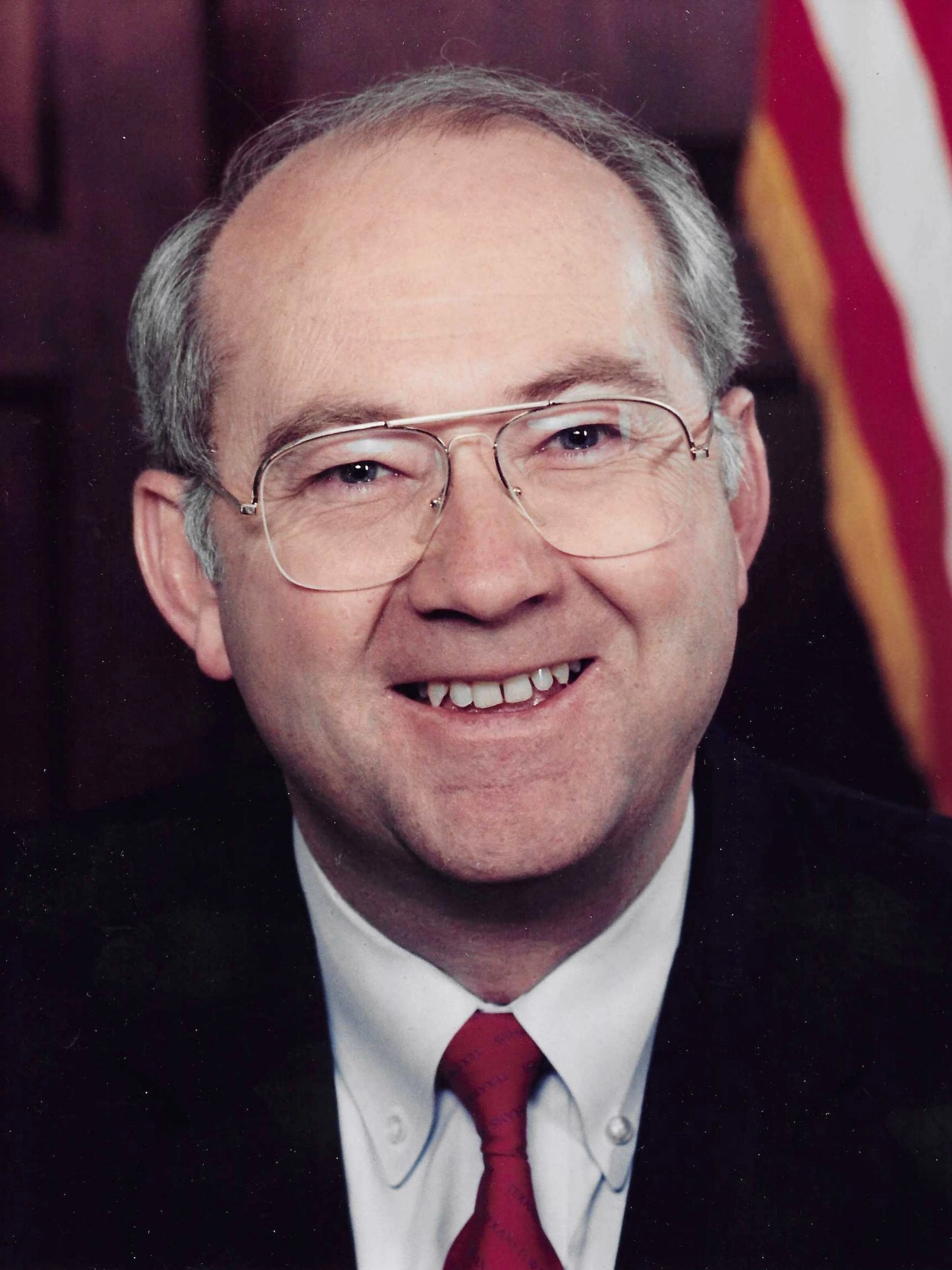

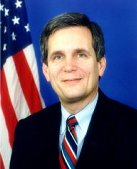
Nominee	Phil Gramm	Lloyd Doggett
Party	Republican	Democratic
Popular vote	3,111,348	2,202,557
Percentage	58.55%	41.45%
- County results Gramm: 50–60% 60–70% 70–80% 80–90% Doggett: 50–60% 60–70% 70–80% 80–90%
U.S. senator before election
John Tower
Republican
Elected U.S. Senator
Phil Gramm
Republican

The 1984 United States Senate election in Texas was held on November 6, 1984. Incumbent Republican U.S. Senator John Tower decided to retire, instead of seeking a fifth term. Republican Phil Gramm won the open seat.

== Republican primary ==
=== Candidates ===
- Phil Gramm, U.S. Representative from College Station since 1979
- Hank Grover, State Senator and former State Representative from Houston, and nominee for Governor of Texas in 1972
- Ron Paul, U.S. Representative from Lake Jackson (1976–1977, 1979–1985)
- Robert Mosbacher Jr., Houston oil businessman

=== Campaign ===
The primary was a multimillion-dollar contest. Gramm recently switched parties in 1983, but he was a conservative who supported Reaganomics. Gramm spent $4 million.

=== Results ===
May Republican primary
Party	Candidate	Votes	%
Republican	Phil Gramm	247,280	73.3%
Republican	Ron Paul	55,771	16.5%
Republican	Robert A. Mosbacher Jr.	26,250	7.8%
Republican	Hank Grover	8,055	2.5%

== Democratic primary ==
=== Candidates ===
- Lloyd Doggett, State Senator from Austin since 1975
- Kent Hance, U.S. Representative from Lubbock since 1979
- Bob Krueger, former U.S. Representative from New Braunfels (1975–1979) and nominee for Senate in 1978
- Harley Schlanger
- Robert Sullivan
- David Young

=== Campaign ===
The primary was 45% Hispanic, but included many moderate to conservative voters. Hance positioned himself as the most moderate to conservative candidate, who co-sponsored President Ronald Reagan's tax package. Doggett was the more liberal candidate, attacking Reaganomics and getting endorsements from the Texas teachers' union and Agriculture Commissioner Jim Hightower. Doggett's campaign manager was James Carville. Krueger was seen as the front runner and was a moderate who supported the state's oil and gas industry, but had close ties with the Hispanic community because he was Spanish-speaking. Hance attacked both Krueger and Doggett for supporting amnesty for illegal aliens and supporting gay rights. The initial primary was extremely close between the top three candidates. Each candidate got 31% of the electorate. Hance ranked first, only 273 votes ahead of Doggett and 1,560 votes ahead of Krueger.

Since no candidate passed the 50% threshold, Hance and Doggett qualified for the run-off election. Hance fired his pollster despite ranking first. Krueger endorsed fellow U.S. Congressman Hance, saying "Ultimately, the quality of one's public service depends upon the character that one displays in filling an office." In the June election, Doggett very narrowly defeated Hance by just 1,345 votes.

=== Results ===
First round results by county: Hance: 30–40%; 40–50%; 50–60%; 60–70%; 70–80%; Doggett: 30–40%; 40–50%; 50–60%; 60–70%; 70–80%; Kruger: 30–40%; 40–50%; 50–60%; 60–70%; 70–80%; 80–90%

Initial election on May 5, 1984

May Democratic primary
Party	Candidate	Votes	%
Democratic	Kent Hance	456,446	31.2%
Democratic	Lloyd Doggett	456,173	31.2%
Democratic	Bob Krueger	454,886	31.1%
Democratic	David Young	47,062	3.2%
Democratic	Robert S. Sullivan	34,733	2.4%
Democratic	Harley Schlanger	14,149	1.0%

Runoff results by county: Doggett: 50–60%; 60–70%; 70–80%; 80–90%; Hance: 50–60%; 60–70%; 70–80%; 80–90%; >90%

Run-off election on June 2, 1984

June Democratic primary runoff
Party	Candidate	Votes	%
Democratic	Lloyd Doggett	491,251	50.1%
Democratic	Kent Hance	489,906	49.9%

== General election ==
=== Candidates ===
- Lloyd Doggett (D), State Senator
- Phil Gramm (R), U.S. Congressman

Doggett received 89% of the black vote.

=== Results ===
General election results
Party	Candidate	Votes	%
Republican	Phil Gramm	3,111,348	58.55%
Democratic	Lloyd Doggett	2,202,557	41.45%
Total votes		5,313,905	100.00%
Republican hold			

== See also ==
- 1984 United States Senate elections

== Works cited ==
- Black, Earl; Black, Merle (1992). The Vital South: How Presidents Are Elected. Harvard University Press. ISBN 0674941306.
