= Claude Stone Jr. =

American politician (1926–2014)

Claude Stone

Member of the Illinois Senate from the 45th district
- In office July 13, 2001 – January 8, 2003
- Preceded by: Robert Madigan
- Succeeded by: Todd Sieben (district renumbered)

Personal details
- Born: Claude Ulysses Stone, Jr. April 30, 1926 Peoria, Illinois
- Died: December 29, 2014 (aged 88) Galesburg, Illinois
- Party: Republican
- Spouse: Mary Louise
- Children: Two
- Education: Cornell University (B.S.); Bradley University (B.S.); Stanford University (M.B.A.)

Claude Ulysses "Bud" Stone (April 30, 1926 – December 29, 2014) was an American politician who served as a Republican member of the Illinois Senate during the 92nd General Assembly. He was born April 30, 1926, to former Democratic Congressman Claude U. Stone and his wife Alma Marie Stone. He was raised in Peoria, Illinois, and graduated from Peoria High School. He earned a Bachelor of Science in economics from Cornell University, a Bachelor of Science in business marketing from Bradley University and a Master of Business Administration from Stanford University, in 1948, 1949 and 1951 respectively. In 1953, he married his wife, Mary Louise, with whom he had three children. In 1956, he became a Republican precinct committeeman, which began a lifetime of activism with the Republican Party including a tenure as chairman of the Tazewell County Republican Party in the 1990s. In 1985, he retired as an executive with Caterpillar Inc.

He was appointed July 13, 2001, to succeed Robert Madigan who was appointed to the Illinois Workers' Compensation Commission. He served on two committees; Agriculture & Conservation; and Licensed Activities. The 45th district, located in Central Illinois, included DeWitt, Logan, Mason, Tazewell, and Woodford counties along with the northern half of Piatt County and the southern portion of McLean County. Soon after, the decennial redistricting process split the territory of the 45th district into neighboring districts and placed Stone in the new 44th district with retiring incumbent John Maitland. Despite the open seat, Stone chose not to run. Instead, then State Representative Bill Brady ran for Senate. He defeated Rus Kinzinger in the Republican primary and former Democratic House Majority Whip Gerald A. Bradley in the 2002 general election. Stone died on December 29, 2014, in Galesburg, Illinois.
