= 1976 United States presidential election in Illinois =

- November 2, 1976
- Turnout: 75.47%

Nominee	Gerald Ford	Jimmy Carter
Party	Republican	Democratic
Home state	Michigan	Georgia
Running mate	Bob Dole	Walter Mondale
Electoral vote	26	0
Popular vote	2,364,269	2,271,295
Percentage	50.10%	48.13%
County results
Ford
40–50%
50–60%
60–70%
Carter
40–50%
50–60%
60–70%
President before election
Gerald Ford
Republican
Elected President
Jimmy Carter
Democratic

The 1976 United States presidential election in Illinois was held on November 2, 1976. All 50 states and The District of Columbia, were part of the 1976 United States presidential election. State voters chose 26 electors to the Electoral College, who voted for president and vice president.

By the second week of September, polls were showing Jimmy Carter ahead of incumbent President Gerald Ford by 14% but running much weaker in the emerging Rust Belt industrial states; his lead in Illinois was estimated at four percentage points. A few days later, another poll had Ford already ahead in Illinois, but another poll had him narrowly behind. Defeated Republican primary candidate and future President Ronald Reagan helped Ford in his fall campaign in Illinois, although Carter preceded him in visiting the state, doing so for the first time on September 24. Ford's running mate Bob Dole followed Carter to the state and said that Carter had "three positions on every issue" during a tour through Rock Island, Quincy, and Decatur. At this time, it was also thought that Ford was helped by the strong GOP gubernatorial campaign of James R. Thompson.

At the beginning of October, Illinois was viewed as "too close to call". Carter paid a second visit to the state with the support of Chicago Mayor Richard Daley, which was viewed essential to his chances of carrying the state's electoral votes due to the coolness of the northern and central parts of the state toward a Southern Evangelical Democrat. Carter would subsequently move ahead, but the state remained very close as election day neared, with South Side black voters considered a critical aspect of Carter's hopes.

Ford won Illinois with 50.10 percent of the vote but lost the general election to Carter. Illinois' result was 4% more Republican than the nation at large, and this was the last presidential election where it was more Republican than the rest of the country. It was also the most recent presidential election where a Democrat won the White House without carrying Illinois, and the first time a Democrat did so in 60 years, since Woodrow Wilson won reelection in 1916.

== Primaries ==
The primaries and general elections coincided with those for congress and those for state offices.

=== Turnout ===
Turnout in the primary election was 36.29%, with a total of 2,087,807 votes cast.

Turnout in the general election was 75.47%, with a total of 4,719,304 votes cast. State-run primaries were held for the Democratic and Republican parties on March 16.

=== Democratic ===
1976 Illinois Democratic presidential primary
- March 16, 1976

169 Democratic National Convention delegates

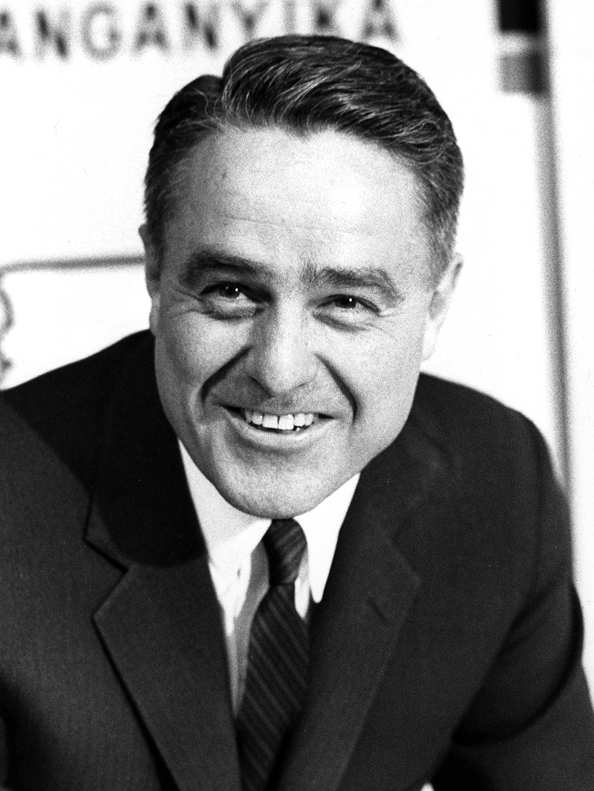

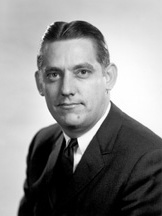

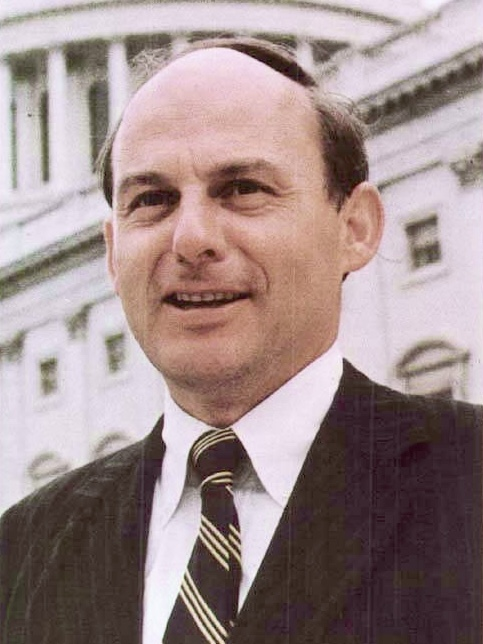

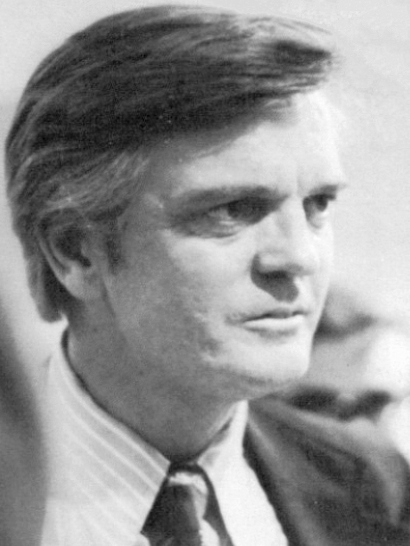
Candidate	Jimmy Carter	George Wallace	Sargent Shriver
Home state	Georgia	Alabama	Maryland
Delegate count	53	3	0
Popular vote	630,915	361,798	214,024
Percentage	48.09%	27.58%	16.31%
Candidate	Fred R. Harris	Adlai Stevenson III	Hubert Humphrey
Home state	Oklahoma	Illinois	Minnesota
Delegate count	0	85	6
Popular vote	98,862	N/A	N/A
Percentage	7.54%	N/A	N/A
Candidate	Dan Walker
Home state	Illinois
Delegate count	4
Popular vote	N/A
Percentage	N/A
County Results
Carter
40-50%
50-60%
60-70%
70-80%
Wallace
40-50%

The 1976 Illinois Democratic presidential primary was held on March 16, 1976, in the U.S. state of Illinois as one of the Democratic Party's statewide nomination contests ahead of the 1976 presidential election.

The popular vote was a "beauty contest". Delegates were instead selected by direct-vote in each congressional district on delegate candidates, who had either pledged to support a candidate or been uncommitted.

The popular vote of the "beauty contest" saw a plurality won by Jimmy Carter.

While he was not a candidate for the popular vote, in the vote for delegates a plurality of the state's delegates were won by delegates supporting favorite son Adlai Stevenson III, with Georgia Governor Jimmy Carter placing second. Stevenson was used as a stand-in by Richard M. Daley to get otherwise uncommitted delegates elected.

1976 Democratic presidential primary
Candidate	Votes	%	Delegates
Jimmy Carter	630,915	48.09	53
George C. Wallace	361,798	27.58	3
Sargent Shriver	214,024	16.31	0
Fred R. Harris	98,862	7.54	0
Write-ins	6,315	0.48	0
Adlai Stevenson III	—N/a	—N/a	85
Hubert Humphrey	—N/a	—N/a	6
Dan Walker	—N/a	—N/a	4
Uncommitted	—N/a	—N/a	18
Totals	1,311,914	100	169

=== Republican ===
1976 Illinois Republican presidential primary
- March 16, 1976
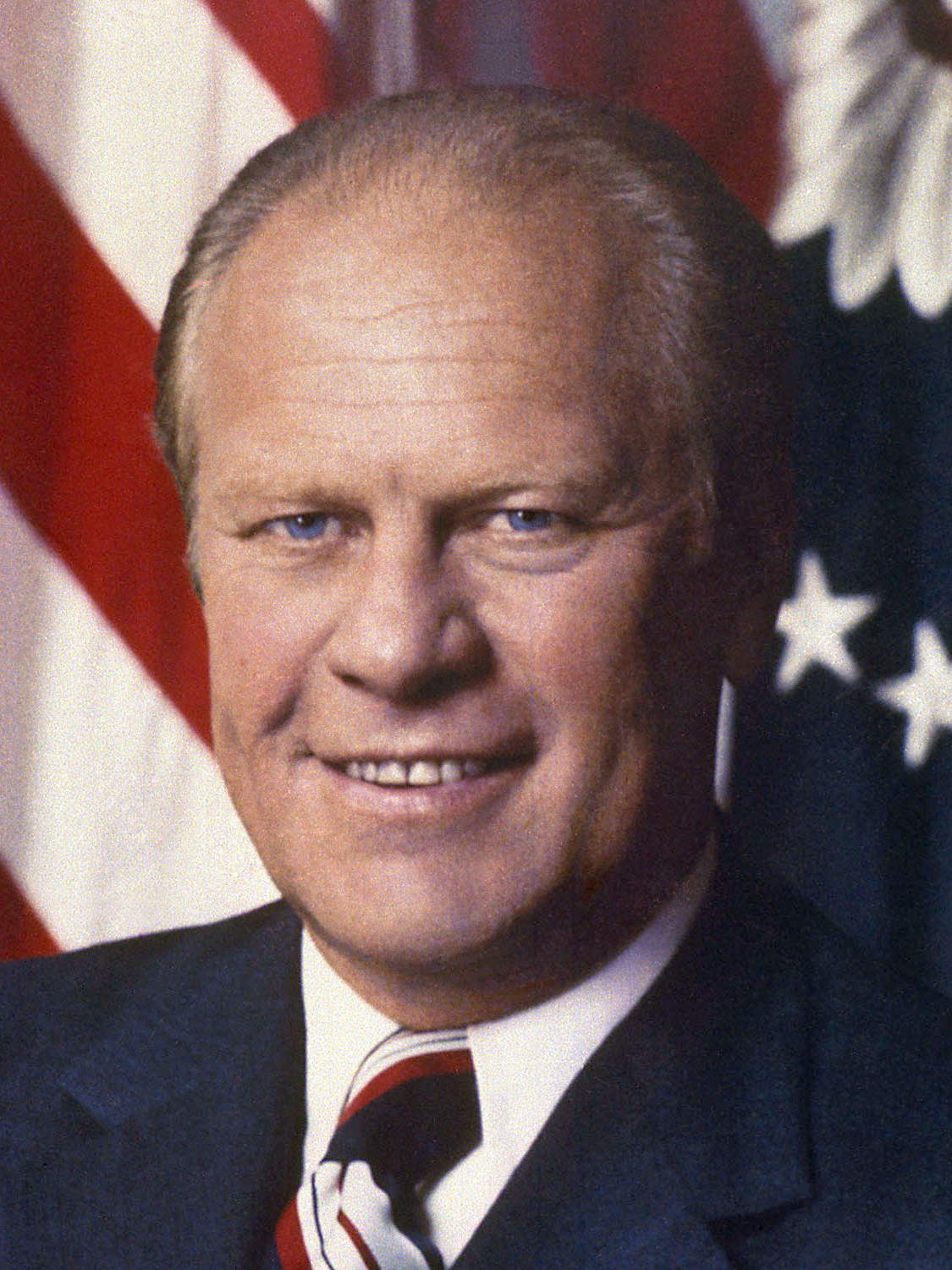

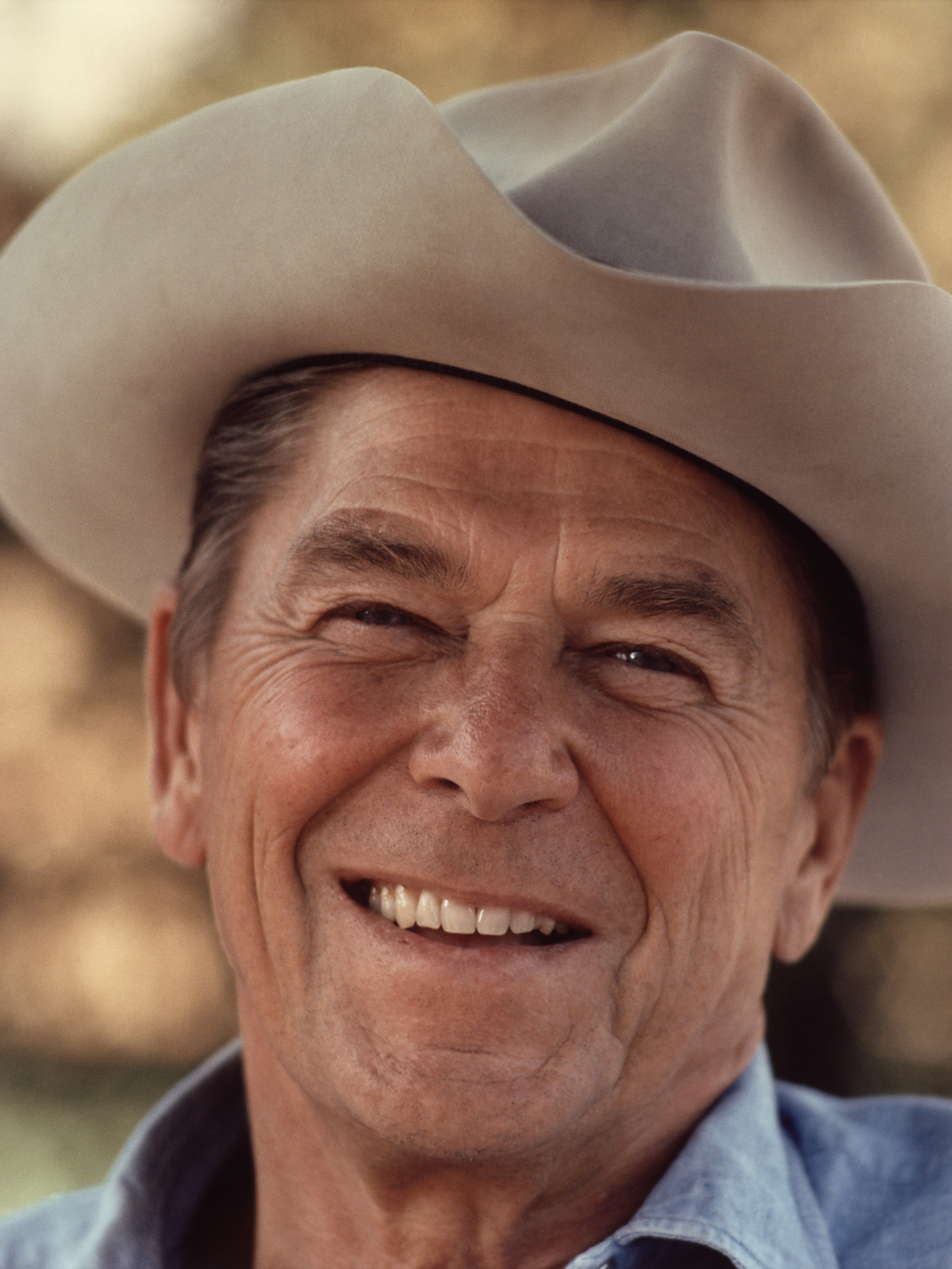
Candidate	Gerald Ford	Ronald Reagan
Home state	Michigan	California
Delegate count	70	13
Popular vote	456,750	311,295
Percentage	58.87%	40.12%
County Results
Ford
50-60%
60-70%
Reagan
40-50%
50-60%
60-70%
70-80%
Tie

The 1976 Illinois Republican presidential primary was held on March 16, 1976, in the U.S. state of Illinois as one of the Republican Party's statewide nomination contests ahead of the 1976 presidential election.

The popular vote was a "beauty contest". Delegates were instead selected by direct-vote in each congressional district on delegate candidates who had either pledged to support a candidate or indicated their intent to enter the convention uncommitted.

1976 Republican presidential primary
Candidate	Votes	%	Delegates
Gerald R. Ford (incumbent)	456,750	58.87	70
Ronald Reagan	311,295	40.12	13
Lar "America First" Daly	7,582	0.98	0
Write-ins	266	0.03	0
Uncommitted	—N/a	—N/a	13
Totals	775,893	100	96

== Results ==
Presidential Candidate	Running Mate	Party	Electoral Vote (EV)	Popular Vote (PV)	
Gerald Ford (incumbent)	Robert Dole	Republican	26	2,364,269	50.10%
Jimmy Carter	Walter Mondale	Democratic	0	2,271,295	48.13%
Eugene McCarthy	John Clay	Independent	0	55,939	1.19%
Gus Hall	Jarvis Tyner	Communist	0	9,250	0.20%
Roger MacBride	David Bergland	Libertarian	0	8,057	0.17%
Peter Camejo	Willie Mae Reid	Socialist Workers	0	3,615	0.08%
Julius Levin	Constance Blomen	Socialist Labor	0	2,422	0.05%
Lyndon LaRouche	R. Wayne Evans	U.S. Labor	0	2,018	0.04%
Ronald Reagan (write-in)	—N/a	—N/a	0	504	0.01%
Tom Anderson (write-in)	—N/a	American Party	0	387	0.01%
Rufus Shackelford (write-in)	—N/a	American Party	0	67	0.00%
Other write-ins			0	1,481	0.03%
Total			26	4,719,304	100%

=== Results by county ===
County	Gerald Ford Republican		Jimmy Carter Democratic		Eugene McCarthy Independent		Various candidates Other parties		Margin		Total votes cast
County	#	%	#	%	#	%	#	%	#	%	Total votes cast
Adams	18,189	59.67%	11,926	39.12%	274	0.90%	96	0.31%	6,263	20.55%	30,485
Alexander	2,349	41.52%	3,246	57.37%	22	0.39%	41	0.72%	-897	-15.85%	5,658
Bond	3,716	49.69%	3,682	49.24%	63	0.84%	17	0.23%	34	0.45%	7,478
Boone	6,470	58.38%	4,458	40.23%	127	1.15%	27	0.24%	2,012	18.15%	11,082
Brown	1,519	48.95%	1,533	49.40%	13	0.42%	38	1.22%	-14	-0.45%	3,103
Bureau	10,854	58.20%	7,566	40.57%	170	0.91%	58	0.31%	3,288	17.63%	18,648
Calhoun	1,364	46.35%	1,549	52.63%	28	0.95%	2	0.07%	-185	-6.28%	2,943
Carroll	5,059	59.34%	3,372	39.55%	73	0.86%	22	0.26%	1,687	19.79%	8,526
Cass	3,524	49.33%	3,589	50.24%	25	0.35%	6	0.08%	-65	-0.91%	7,144
Champaign	34,546	54.74%	26,858	42.56%	1,425	2.26%	278	0.44%	7,688	12.18%	63,107
Christian	7,445	43.90%	9,306	54.87%	166	0.98%	43	0.25%	-1,861	-10.97%	16,960
Clark	4,506	52.26%	4,071	47.22%	37	0.43%	8	0.09%	435	5.04%	8,622
Clay	3,860	49.94%	3,837	49.64%	23	0.30%	9	0.12%	23	0.30%	7,729
Clinton	7,245	53.00%	6,275	45.90%	139	1.02%	12	0.09%	970	7.10%	13,671
Coles	11,021	54.66%	8,639	42.85%	434	2.15%	68	0.34%	2,382	11.81%	20,162
Cook	987,498	44.69%	1,180,814	53.44%	27,706	1.25%	13,730	0.62%	-193,316	-8.75%	2,209,748
Crawford	5,522	51.99%	5,007	47.14%	73	0.69%	20	0.19%	515	4.85%	10,622
Cumberland	2,518	47.12%	2,752	51.50%	32	0.60%	42	0.79%	-234	-4.38%	5,344
DeKalb	18,193	59.21%	11,535	37.54%	740	2.41%	260	0.85%	6,658	21.67%	30,728
DeWitt	4,137	53.97%	3,477	45.36%	30	0.39%	22	0.29%	660	8.61%	7,666
Douglas	4,635	54.39%	3,826	44.90%	44	0.52%	17	0.20%	809	9.49%	8,522
DuPage	175,055	68.77%	72,137	28.34%	4,058	1.59%	3,297	1.30%	102,918	40.43%	254,547
Edgar	5,842	53.01%	5,058	45.89%	84	0.76%	37	0.34%	784	7.12%	11,021
Edwards	2,379	58.51%	1,648	40.53%	24	0.59%	15	0.37%	731	17.98%	4,066
Effingham	7,194	53.72%	5,952	44.45%	113	0.84%	132	0.99%	1,242	9.27%	13,391
Fayette	5,059	49.33%	5,128	50.00%	59	0.58%	9	0.09%	-69	-0.67%	10,255
Ford	4,801	63.56%	2,690	35.61%	42	0.56%	20	0.26%	2,111	27.95%	7,553
Franklin	7,420	36.51%	12,818	63.07%	40	0.20%	46	0.23%	-5,398	-26.56%	20,324
Fulton	9,588	50.23%	9,314	48.79%	130	0.68%	58	0.30%	274	1.44%	19,090
Gallatin	1,499	36.36%	2,611	63.33%	9	0.22%	4	0.10%	-1,112	-26.97%	4,123
Greene	3,706	47.35%	4,057	51.83%	45	0.57%	19	0.24%	-351	-4.48%	7,827
Grundy	7,581	57.43%	5,534	41.92%	59	0.45%	27	0.20%	2,047	15.51%	13,201
Hamilton	2,433	44.25%	3,036	55.22%	23	0.42%	6	0.11%	-603	-10.97%	5,498
Hancock	6,043	55.54%	4,730	43.47%	82	0.75%	26	0.24%	1,313	12.07%	10,881
Hardin	1,393	46.17%	1,602	53.10%	12	0.40%	10	0.33%	-209	-6.93%	3,017
Henderson	2,210	50.15%	2,152	48.83%	33	0.75%	12	0.27%	58	1.32%	4,407
Henry	12,849	56.03%	9,822	42.83%	199	0.87%	64	0.28%	3,027	13.20%	22,934
Iroquois	10,129	65.43%	5,167	33.38%	86	0.56%	99	0.64%	4,962	32.05%	15,481
Jackson	10,152	42.09%	12,940	53.64%	905	3.75%	125	0.52%	-2,788	-11.55%	24,122
Jasper	2,794	49.45%	2,772	49.06%	78	1.38%	6	0.11%	22	0.39%	5,650
Jefferson	7,422	44.93%	8,989	54.41%	66	0.40%	43	0.26%	-1,567	-9.48%	16,520
Jersey	4,273	47.57%	4,625	51.49%	75	0.83%	10	0.11%	-352	-3.92%	8,983
Jo Daviess	5,478	56.90%	3,979	41.33%	130	1.35%	41	0.43%	1,499	15.57%	9,628
Johnson	2,417	52.23%	2,182	47.15%	24	0.52%	5	0.11%	235	5.08%	4,628
Kane	59,275	62.15%	34,057	35.71%	1,283	1.35%	759	0.80%	25,218	26.44%	95,374
Kankakee	23,003	54.63%	18,394	43.68%	344	0.82%	367	0.87%	4,609	10.95%	42,108
Kendall	9,011	67.50%	4,202	31.48%	110	0.82%	26	0.19%	4,809	36.02%	13,349
Knox	14,123	54.39%	11,525	44.38%	245	0.94%	74	0.28%	2,598	10.01%	25,967
Lake	92,231	60.32%	57,741	37.77%	2,388	1.56%	534	0.35%	34,490	22.55%	152,894
LaSalle	25,114	51.39%	23,105	47.28%	503	1.03%	143	0.29%	2,009	4.11%	48,865
Lawrence	4,345	51.47%	4,044	47.90%	42	0.50%	11	0.13%	301	3.57%	8,442
Lee	8,674	57.54%	6,076	40.30%	208	1.38%	118	0.78%	2,598	17.24%	15,076
Livingston	10,097	64.56%	5,174	33.08%	303	1.94%	66	0.42%	4,923	31.48%	15,640
Logan	8,623	59.94%	5,686	39.52%	63	0.44%	14	0.10%	2,937	20.42%	14,386
Macon	24,893	46.44%	28,243	52.69%	366	0.68%	97	0.18%	-3,350	-6.25%	53,599
Macoupin	10,242	45.55%	11,910	52.97%	223	0.99%	111	0.49%	-1,668	-7.42%	22,486
Madison	44,183	43.32%	56,457	55.35%	1,085	1.06%	273	0.27%	-12,274	-12.03%	101,998
Marion	8,729	46.63%	9,834	52.53%	124	0.66%	33	0.18%	-1,105	-5.90%	18,720
Marshall	4,017	60.30%	2,570	38.58%	59	0.89%	16	0.24%	1,447	21.72%	6,662
Mason	3,847	49.01%	3,947	50.29%	38	0.48%	17	0.22%	-100	-1.28%	7,849
Massac	3,226	46.50%	3,666	52.85%	33	0.48%	12	0.17%	-440	-6.35%	6,937
McDonough	9,683	62.33%	5,464	35.17%	272	1.75%	115	0.74%	4,219	27.16%	15,534
McHenry	37,115	67.50%	16,799	30.55%	871	1.58%	204	0.37%	20,316	36.95%	54,989
McLean	28,493	62.10%	16,601	36.18%	592	1.29%	193	0.42%	11,892	25.92%	45,879
Menard	3,137	57.25%	2,301	42.00%	35	0.64%	6	0.11%	836	15.25%	5,479
Mercer	4,816	53.62%	4,090	45.54%	63	0.70%	13	0.14%	726	8.08%	8,982
Monroe	5,602	57.66%	3,984	41.00%	110	1.13%	20	0.21%	1,618	16.66%	9,716
Montgomery	7,379	46.56%	8,322	52.51%	127	0.80%	20	0.13%	-943	-5.95%	15,848
Morgan	8,885	53.88%	7,403	44.90%	155	0.94%	46	0.28%	1,482	8.98%	16,489
Moultrie	2,803	45.44%	3,332	54.01%	27	0.44%	7	0.11%	-529	-8.57%	6,169
Ogle	11,073	62.22%	6,463	36.32%	203	1.14%	58	0.33%	4,610	25.90%	17,797
Peoria	46,526	56.65%	34,606	42.14%	744	0.91%	247	0.30%	11,920	14.51%	82,123
Perry	5,286	46.39%	5,976	52.44%	76	0.67%	57	0.50%	-690	-6.05%	11,395
Piatt	4,442	55.39%	3,509	43.75%	44	0.55%	25	0.31%	933	11.64%	8,020
Pike	4,975	49.21%	5,006	49.52%	37	0.37%	92	0.91%	-31	-0.31%	10,110
Pope	1,187	52.18%	1,070	47.03%	14	0.62%	4	0.18%	117	5.15%	2,275
Pulaski	1,836	42.26%	2,489	57.28%	12	0.28%	8	0.18%	-653	-15.02%	4,345
Putnam	1,572	53.13%	1,344	45.42%	27	0.91%	16	0.54%	228	7.71%	2,959
Randolph	8,190	48.07%	8,693	51.02%	134	0.79%	21	0.12%	-503	-2.95%	17,038
Richland	4,434	55.03%	3,485	43.25%	72	0.89%	66	0.82%	949	11.78%	8,057
Rock Island	34,007	47.72%	35,994	50.51%	751	1.05%	509	0.71%	-1,987	-2.79%	71,261
Saline	5,970	44.25%	7,472	55.38%	33	0.24%	18	0.13%	-1,502	-11.13%	13,493
Sangamon	43,309	52.24%	38,017	45.85%	920	1.11%	664	0.80%	5,292	6.39%	82,910
Schuyler	2,635	56.44%	2,014	43.14%	16	0.34%	4	0.09%	621	13.30%	4,669
Scott	1,789	55.35%	1,424	44.06%	14	0.43%	5	0.15%	365	11.29%	3,232
Shelby	5,234	45.54%	6,172	53.70%	65	0.57%	22	0.19%	-938	-8.16%	11,493
St. Clair	40,333	39.91%	59,177	58.55%	984	0.97%	571	0.56%	-18,844	-18.64%	101,065
Stark	2,191	63.34%	1,146	33.13%	29	0.84%	93	2.69%	1,045	30.21%	3,459
Stephenson	11,678	61.02%	7,192	37.58%	213	1.11%	54	0.28%	4,486	23.44%	19,137
Tazewell	28,951	55.14%	22,821	43.47%	402	0.77%	329	0.63%	6,130	11.67%	52,503
Union	3,531	41.16%	5,003	58.32%	36	0.42%	8	0.09%	-1,472	-17.16%	8,578
Vermilion	19,751	51.24%	18,438	47.83%	253	0.66%	104	0.27%	1,313	3.41%	38,546
Wabash	3,388	54.41%	2,781	44.66%	31	0.50%	27	0.43%	607	9.75%	6,227
Warren	5,822	59.25%	3,808	38.75%	78	0.79%	118	1.20%	2,014	20.50%	9,826
Washington	4,485	57.18%	3,222	41.08%	68	0.87%	69	0.88%	1,263	16.10%	7,844
Wayne	5,211	54.39%	4,303	44.91%	40	0.42%	27	0.28%	908	9.48%	9,581
White	4,600	46.31%	5,306	53.42%	16	0.16%	11	0.11%	-706	-7.11%	9,933
Whiteside	14,308	55.34%	11,255	43.53%	221	0.85%	70	0.27%	3,053	11.81%	25,854
Will	61,784	53.85%	51,103	44.54%	1,358	1.18%	482	0.42%	10,681	9.31%	114,727
Williamson	10,703	43.59%	13,600	55.39%	210	0.86%	40	0.16%	-2,897	-11.80%	24,553
Winnebago	52,736	54.15%	42,399	43.54%	1,044	1.07%	1,208	1.24%	10,337	10.61%	97,387
Woodford	8,899	64.00%	4,819	34.66%	105	0.76%	81	0.58%	4,080	29.34%	13,904
Totals	2,364,269	50.10%	2,271,295	48.13%	55,939	1.19%	27,330	0.58%	92,974	1.97%	4,718,833

==== Counties that flipped from Republican to Democratic ====
- Alexander
- Cook
- Brown
- Calhoun
- Cass
- Christian
- Cumberland
- Fayette
- Franklin
- Gallatin
- Greene
- Hamilton
- Hardin
- Jefferson
- Jersey
- Macon
- Macoupin
- Madison
- Marion
- Mason
- Massac
- Montgomery
- Moultrie
- Perry
- Pike
- Pulaski
- Randolph
- Rock Island
- St. Clair
- Saline
- Shelby
- Union
- White
- Williamson

=== By congressional district ===
Ford won 16 out of the state's 24 congressional districts, including 4 which elected Democrats.

District	Ford	Carter	Representative
1st	9.5%	90.5%	Ralph Metcalfe
2nd	17.2%	82.8%	Morgan F. Murphy
3rd	57.9%	42.1%	Marty Russo
4th	61.9%	38.1%	Ed Derwinski
5th	33.4%	66.6%	John G. Fary
6th	59.8%	40.2%	Henry Hyde
7th	19.2%	80.8%	Cardiss Collins
8th	30.1%	69.9%	Dan Rostenkowski
9th	42.2%	57.8%	Sidney R. Yates
10th	60.7%	39.3%	Abner Mikva
11th	51.7%	48.3%	Frank Annunzio
12th	69.1%	30.9%	Phil Crane
13th	62.8%	37.2%	Robert McClory
14th	71.2%	28.8%	John N. Erlenborn
15th	59.5%	40.5%	Tim Lee Hall
15th	59.5%	40.5%	Tom Corcoran
16th	58.7%	41.3%	John B. Anderson
17th	55.7%	44.3%	George M. O'Brien
18th	56.2%	43.8%	Bob Michel
19th	53.8%	46.2%	Tom Railsback
20th	52.8%	47.2%	Paul Findley
21st	55.5%	44.5%	Ed Madigan
22nd	51.5%	48.5%	George E. Shipley
23rd	40.8%	59.2%	Melvin Price
24th	46.1%	53.9%	Paul Simon

== See also ==
- United States presidential elections in Illinois
