= 1991 United States House of Representatives elections =

- June 18, 1991 – November 5, 1991

6 of the 435 seats in the U.S. House of Representatives 218 seats needed for a majority
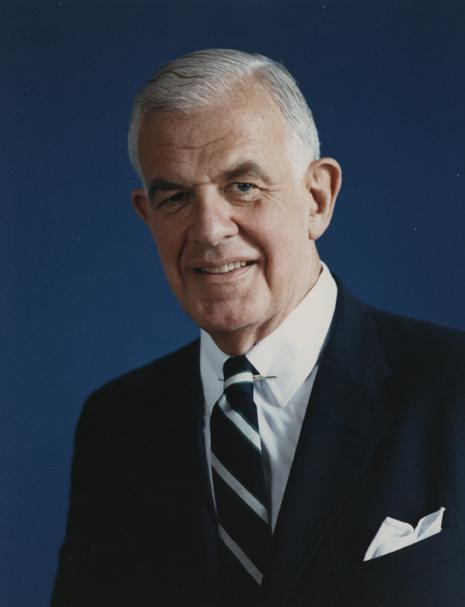

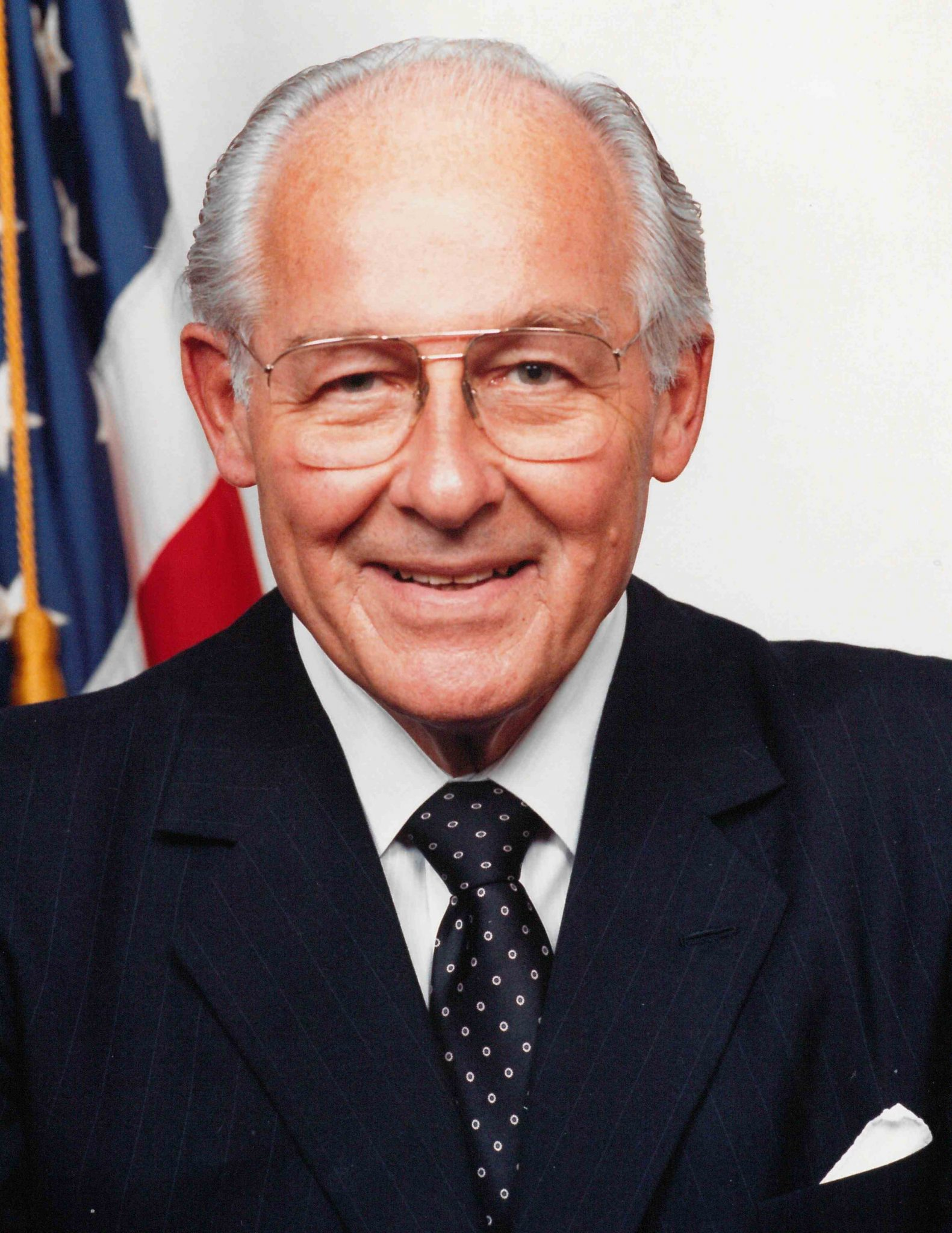
	Majority party	Minority party
Leader	Tom Foley	Bob Michel
Party	Democratic	Republican
Leader since	January 3, 1987	January 3, 1981
Leader's seat	Washington 5th	Illinois 18th
Last election	267 seats	167 seats
Seats won	3	3
Seat change	▲1	▼1
	Third party
Party	Independent
Last election	1 seats
Seats won	0
Seat change	Steady
Speaker before election
Tom Foley
Democratic
Elected Speaker
Tom Foley
Democratic

There were six special elections to the United States House of Representatives in 1991 during the 102nd United States Congress.

== List of elections ==
Elections are listed by date and district.

District	Incumbent			This race	
District	Member	Party	First elected	Results	Candidates
Massachusetts 1	Silvio O. Conte	Republican	1958	Incumbent died February 8, 1991. New member elected June 18, 1991. Democratic gain.	▌ ✓ John Olver (Democratic) 49.6%; ▌Steven Pierce (Republican) 48.2%; Others: ▌Patrick Joseph Armstrong (Independent) 1.3%; ▌ Dennis M. Kelly (Pro-Democracy Reform) 0.6%; ▌ Thomas Boynton (Unenrolled) 0.2%
Illinois 15	Edward Rell Madigan	Republican	1972	Incumbent resigned upon appointment as U.S. Secretary of Agriculture. New member elected July 2, 1991. Republican hold.	▌ ✓ Thomas W. Ewing (Republican) 66.3%; ▌Gerald A. Bradley (Democratic) 33.6%
Texas 3	Steve Bartlett	Republican	1982	Incumbent resigned March 11, 1991 to become Mayor of Dallas. New member elected May 18, 1991. Republican hold.	▌ ✓ Sam Johnson (Republican) 52.6%; ▌Tom Pauken (Republican) 47.4%
Arizona 2	Mo Udall	Democratic	1961 (Special)	Incumbent resigned for health reasons. New member elected October 3, 1991. Democratic hold.	▌ ✓ Ed Pastor (Democratic) 55.5%; ▌Pat Conner (Republican) 44.4%
Pennsylvania 2	William H. Gray III	Democratic	1978	Incumbent resigned to become director of the UNCF. New member elected November 5, 1991. Democratic hold.	▌ ✓ Lucien E. Blackwell (Democratic) 39.2%; ▌Chaka Fattah (Consumer) 28.0%; ▌John F. White Jr. (John F. White Jr. Party) 27.6%; ▌Nadine G. Smith-Bulford (Republican) 5.2%
Virginia 7	D. French Slaughter Jr.	Republican	1984	Incumbent resigned due to ill health (stroke). New member elected November 5, 1991. Republican hold.	▌ ✓ George Allen (Republican) 62.0%; ▌Kay E. Slaughter (Democratic) 34.7%

== See also ==
- List of special elections to the United States House of Representatives
- 102nd United States Congress
