= Myron Olson =

American politician

Myron J. Olson (June 24, 1928 - January 25, 1992) was a Republican member of the Illinois House of Representatives from his appointment on September 22, 1981, to his death on January 25, 1992.

== Biography ==
Myron J. Olson was born June 24, 1928, in Wausau, Wisconsin. He was raised in Wisconsin and joined the United States Army at age 18 where he served in the Signal Corps and was stationed in post-World War II Japan. He was honorably discharged at the rank of sergeant.

At age 24, he was a campaign aide for Melvin Laird's successful campaign in Wisconsin's 7th congressional district. He moved to Dixon, Illinois, in 1956 to become a salesman for Monarch. He was civically active in Dixon as a member of the Dixon Water Board, including two years as its President, and as a member of the Lee County Republican Party. In 1976, he was elected the Circuit Clerk of Lee County.

On September 22, 1981, he was appointed to the Illinois House of Representatives to succeed Calvin W. Schuneman upon the latter's appointment to the Illinois Senate. At that time, the multi-member district consisted of Lee and Bureau counties and portions of DeKalb, Henry, Ogle, and Whiteside counties. After the Cutback Amendment, he was redistricted from the 37th district to the 70th district which included Lee and Ogle counties. He was elected to the new district unopposed. During his tenure, he rose to the rank of Deputy Minority Leader under Lee A. Daniels. He sponsored a resolution requesting that Fay Vincent, the Commissioner of Major League Baseball at the time, review the case of Shoeless Joe Jackson and his alleged role in the Black Sox Scandal in the hopes of vindicating Jackson.

Olson had a heart attack while shoveling snow and died at Shaw Bathea Hospital on Saturday, January 25, 1992. David Deets, a physician from Dixon, was appointed to succeed him in the Illinois House and as a candidate in the new 73rd district. Deets lost by 378 votes to Democratic attorney Pennie Von Bergen Wessels of Sterling, Illinois.
