= Senator Sieben =

Senator Sieben may refer to:

- Katie Sieben (born 1977), Minnesota State Senate
- Todd Sieben (born 1945), Illinois State Senate
