= Senator Bivins =

Senator Bivins may refer to:

- Teel Bivins (1947–2009), Texas State Senate
- Tim Bivins (born 1951), Illinois State Senate
