= Senator Maitland =

Senator Maitland may refer to:

- Alexander Maitland (Michigan politician) (1844–1929), Michigan State Senate
- John Maitland (Illinois politician) (born 1936), Illinois State Senate
