= Senator Madigan =

Senator Madigan may refer to:

- Colleen Madigan (born 1964), Maine State Senate
- Lisa Madigan (born 1966), Illinois State Senate
- Robert Madigan (1942–2006), Illinois State Senate
- Roger A. Madigan (1930–2018), Pennsylvania State Senate
