= Roger Sommer =

Roger Sommer may refer to:

- Roger Sommer (aviator)
- Roger Sommer (politician)
