= Clifford C. Ireland =

American politician (1878–1930)

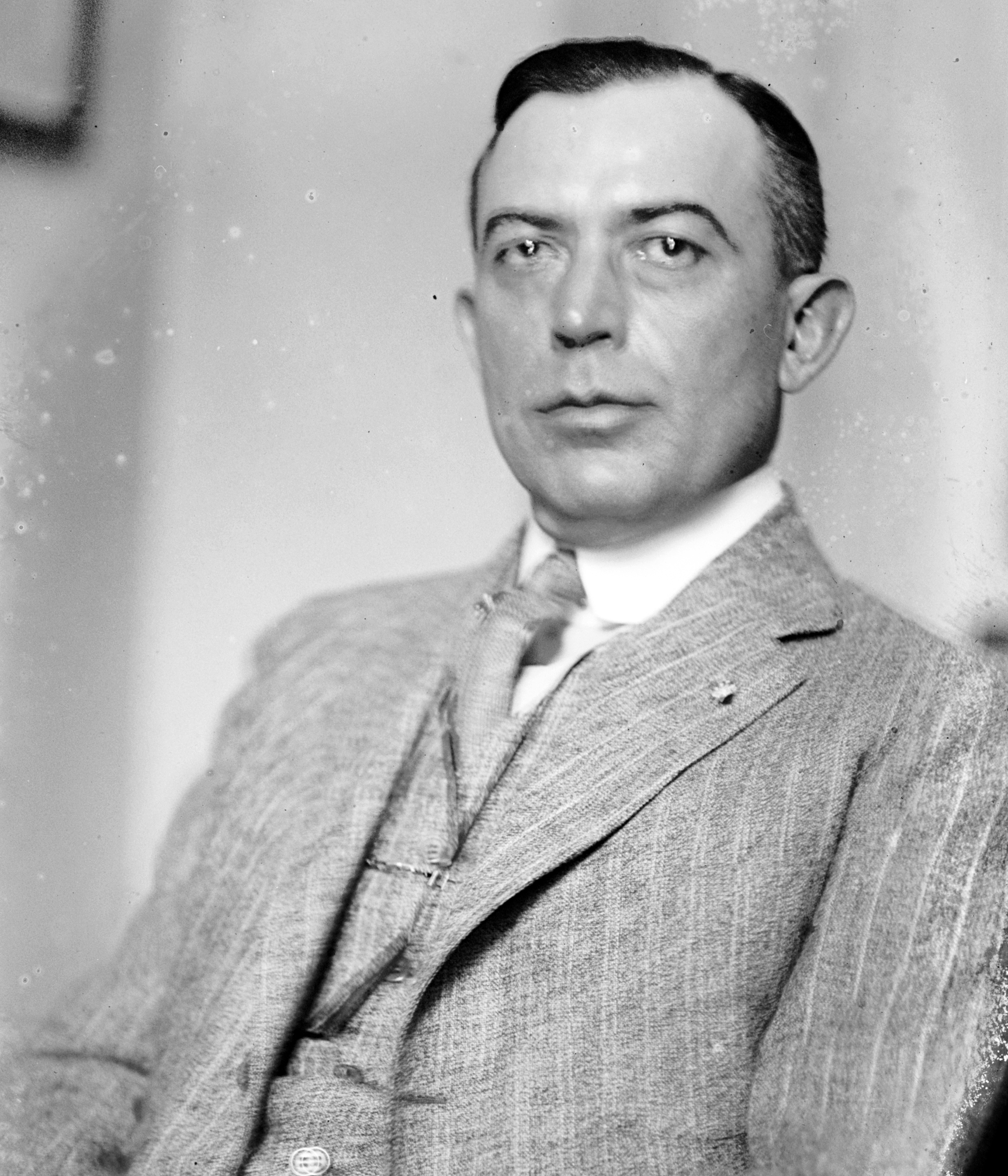

Member of the U.S. House of Representatives from Illinois's 16th district
- In office March 4, 1917 – March 3, 1923
- Preceded by: Claude U. Stone
- Succeeded by: William E. Hull

Personal details
- Born: February 14, 1878 Washburn, Illinois, U.S.
- Died: May 24, 1930 (aged 52) Chicago, Illinois, U.S.
- Party: Republican

Clifford Cady Ireland (February 14, 1878 – May 24, 1930) was a U.S. representative from Illinois.

== Biography ==
Born in Washburn, Illinois, Ireland attended the common schools, Cheltenham Military Academy, Ogontz, Philadelphia, and Knox College, Galesburg, Illinois. He was graduated from the University of Wisconsin–Madison in 1901 and from the Illinois College of Law at Chicago in 1908. He was admitted to the bar in 1909 and commenced practice in Peoria. He served as a private in the Illinois National Guard during the Spanish–American War.

Ireland was elected as a Republican to the Sixty-fifth, Sixty-sixth, and Sixty-seventh Congresses (March 4, 1917 – March 3, 1923). He served as chairman of the Committee on Accounts (Sixty-sixth and Sixty-seventh Congresses). He was an unsuccessful candidate for renomination in 1922. He resumed the practice of law at Peoria. He was appointed a director of the department of trade and commerce of Illinois in 1923, serving until his resignation in 1926. He died in Chicago, Illinois, May 24, 1930. He was interred in Linn-Mount Vernon Cemetery, Washburn, Illinois.

U.S. House of Representatives
| Preceded by Claude U. Stone | Member of the U.S. House of Representatives from Illinois's 16th congressional district 1917-1923 | Succeeded by William E. Hull |
