= Bob Walker (Pennsylvania politician) =

American politician (born 1942)

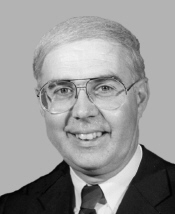

Chair of the House Science Committee
- In office January 3, 1995 – January 3, 1997
- Preceded by: George Brown
- Succeeded by: Jim Sensenbrenner

House Republican Chief Deputy Whip
- In office January 3, 1989 – January 3, 1995 Serving with Steve Gunderson (1989–1993)
- Leader: Bob Michel
- Preceded by: Ed Madigan
- Succeeded by: Dennis Hastert

Member of the U.S. House of Representatives from Pennsylvania's 16th district
- In office January 3, 1977 – January 3, 1997
- Preceded by: Edwin Eshleman
- Succeeded by: Joe Pitts

Personal details
- Born: December 23, 1942 (age 83) Bradford, Pennsylvania, U.S.
- Party: Republican
- Education: College of William and Mary; Millersville University (BS); University of Delaware, Newark (MA)
- Walker's voice Walker supporting the International Space Station Authorization Act of 1995. Recorded September 27, 1995

Robert Smith Walker (born December 23, 1942) is an American educator and politician who represented Pennsylvania in the United States House of Representatives as a Republican for ten terms from 1977 until his retirement in 1997. He was best known for his fiery rhetoric and knowledge of parliamentary procedure.

== Life and career ==
Born in Bradford, Pennsylvania, Walker graduated from Penn Manor High School. He attended the College of William and Mary from 1960 to 1961 and received his B.S. from Millersville University of Pennsylvania in 1964.

=== Early career ===
Walker taught high school from 1964 to 1967. He took his M.A. from the University of Delaware in 1968 and served in the Pennsylvania National Guard from 1967 to 1973.

Walker became an assistant to Pennsylvania congressman Edwin Duing Eshleman, working for him from 1967 to Eshleman's retirement in 1977.

=== Congress ===
In 1976, Walker won the Republican nomination to succeed Eshleman from the 16th District, including all or part of Lebanon, Lancaster, and Chester counties.

In Congress, Walker was an outspoken conservative and allied himself with fellow conservatives Newt Gingrich, Bob Dornan, Trent Lott and the Conservative Opportunity Society. He was one of the speakers at the first Pennsylvania Leadership Conference in 1989. Michael Barone and Grant Ujifusa wrote that Walker was "scrappy, good humored, and ready to push his principles forward even at the cost of being mocked."

He was a hawk on deficit spending and worked to reduce government spending but at the same time served on the science committee and advocated more spending on the space program, weather research, hydrogen research, and earthquake programs as well as pushing for a cabinet-level department of science.

Walker was also responsible for a rare punishment of the Speaker of the House and aiding in the rise of Gingrich. When C-SPAN began televising the House, Walker, Gingrich, and other conservatives found they could reach a national audience with special order speeches, given at the end of the day after the House finished its legislative program. In these speeches, they assailed the Democrats and their leadership in the House. On May 10, 1984, Walker was speaking to an empty chamber and Speaker Tip O'Neill had the cameras pan the nearly empty chamber. No notice of this change was given to the Republicans when it was implemented on May 14, 1984. When the Republicans found out what was going on, Walker, who was speaking when the panning began, and Bob Michel, the Republican leader, angrily complained on the floor. The next day, Gingrich was speaking and Speaker O'Neill lost his cool, resulting in O'Neill's words being taken down and ruled out of order. No Speaker had been so punished since 1795. These events made Gingrich a household name. Gingrich would later bring Walker into the Republican leadership; Walker was chief deputy whip.

Walker was a fierce advocate of stronger drug laws. He proposed that all federal contractors institute programs among their employees with violations to result in the forfeiture of federal contracts – even if as little as one joint were found in a contractor's workplace. Walker also led a campaign against the rewriting of the Congressional Record and had the practice banned in the 104th Congress when Republicans won control of the House. He was chairman of the House Science Committee during his last term.

Congressional Quarterly wrote that "he has raised too many hackles and rubbed too many nerves to be very popular" in the House, but the voters back in Pennsylvania only once gave him less than sixty-five percent of the vote.

=== Later career ===
In 2001 he was appointed by President George W. Bush to chair the Commission on the Future of the United States Aerospace Industry. He also served on the President's Commission on Implementation of the United States Space Exploration Policy (2004) and the President's Commission on the United States Postal Service (2005).

His name had been circulated as a possible NASA administrator following the 2004 resignation of Sean O'Keefe. He is now on the board of directors of Space Adventures, and has served as chairman of the board of the Space Foundation. He is chairman of the Hydrogen and Fuel Cell Technical Advisory Committee of the U.S. Department of Energy. In October 2016 he was appointed space policy adviser of Donald Trump's presidential campaign.

Walker was executive chairman of the Washington lobbying firm, Wexler & Walker Public Policy Associates, before it closed its doors at the end of 2018. Walker is CEO of MoonWalker Associates. Walker is a member of the ReFormers Caucus of Issue One.

== Bibliography ==
- Michael Barone and Grant Ujifusa. The Almanac of American Politics, 1994. Washington, D.C.: National Journal, 1993. ISBN 0-89234-058-4
- Congressional Quarterly. Politics in America, 1992: The 102nd Congress. Washington, D.C.: CQ Press, 1991. ISBN 0-87187-599-3
- United States. Congress. Joint Committee on Printing. 1987–1988 Official Congressional Directory, 100th Congress. Duncan Nystrom, editor. Washington, D.C.: United States Government Printing Office, 1987.
- United States. Congress. Joint Committee on Printing. 1991–1992 Official Congressional Directory, 102d Congress. Duncan Nystrom, editor. S. Pub. 102–4. Washington, D.C.: United States Government Printing Office, 1991.

U.S. House of Representatives
| Preceded by Edwin Eshleman | Member of the U.S. House of Representatives from Pennsylvania's 16th congressional district 1977–1997 | Succeeded by Joe Pitts |
| Preceded by Manuel Lujan Jr. | Ranking Member of the House Science Committee; 1989–1995 | Succeeded by George Brown |
| Preceded by George Brown | Chair of the House Science Committee; 1995–1997 | Succeeded by Jim Sensenbrenner |
Party political offices
| Preceded by Ed Madigan | House Republican Chief Deputy Whip; 1989–1995; Served alongside: Steve Gunderson (1989–1993) | Succeeded by Dennis Hastert |
| Preceded by Vin Weber | Chair of the Conservative Opportunity Society; 1989–1995 | Succeeded by Tom Ewing |
| New office | Chair of House Republican Leadership; 1995–1997 | Succeeded by Bill Paxon |
U.S. order of precedence (ceremonial)
| Preceded by Greg Walden as Former US Representative | Order of precedence of the United States as Former US Representative | Succeeded by Robert A. Borski as Former US Representative |
