= Claude U. Stone =

American politician (1879–1957)

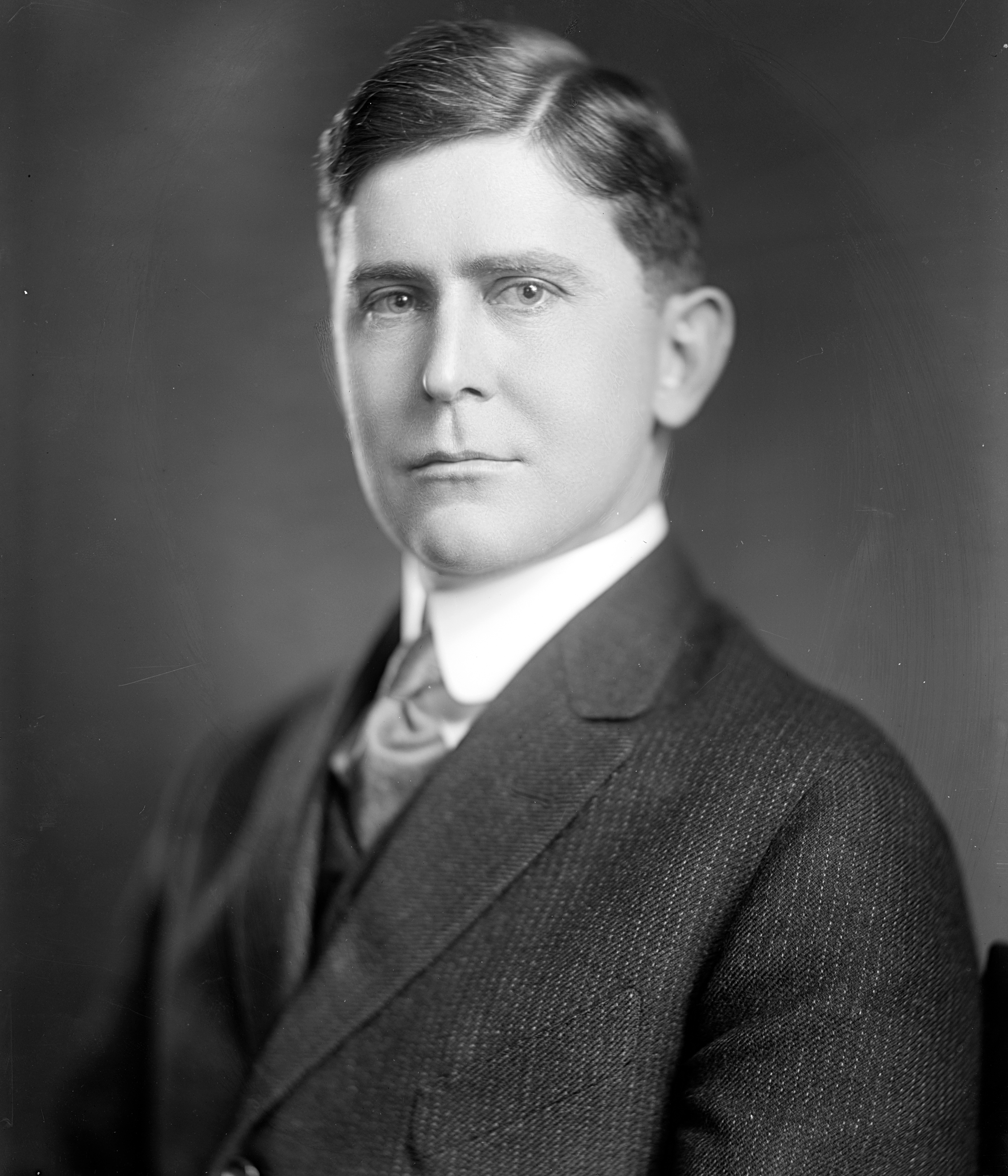
- Stone, 1905–1945

Member of the U.S. House of Representatives from Illinois's 16th district
- In office March 4, 1911 – March 3, 1917
- Preceded by: Joseph V. Graff
- Succeeded by: Clifford C. Ireland

Personal details
- Born: Claudius Ulysses Stone; May 11, 1879 Greenview, Illinois, U.S.
- Died: November 13, 1957 (aged 78) Peoria, Illinois, U.S.
- Party: Democratic

Claudius Ulysses Stone (May 11, 1879 – November 13, 1957) was a U.S. representative from Illinois.

== Biography ==
Born on a farm in Menard County, near Greenview, Illinois, Stone attended the rural school and Western Normal College, Bushnell, Illinois. At the age of seventeen, Stone became a teacher in the Bee Grove rural school in Menard County for one year. He was the principal of Brimfield (Illinois) Public Schools for two years. During the Spanish–American War, he served as a corporal in Company K, Fourth Illinois Volunteer Infantry, from May 1898 to May 1899 with service in Cuba. He studied law at the University of Michigan at Ann Arbor and at George Washington University, Washington, D.C.

Stone was elected county superintendent of schools for Peoria County, Illinois, in 1902, reelected in 1906, and served until 1910. He served as president of the Association of County Superintendents of Schools of Illinois in 1909. He was admitted to the bar in 1909 and commenced practice in Peoria, Illinois.

Stone was elected as a Democrat to the Sixty-second, Sixty-third, and Sixty-fourth Congresses (March 4, 1911 – March 3, 1917). He was an unsuccessful candidate for reelection in 1916 to the Sixty-fifth Congress. He was the postmaster of Peoria from 1917 until he resigned in October 1920 to practice law. He served as master in chancery of the circuit court of Peoria County, Illinois from June 5, 1928, to January 20, 1945. He was editor and publisher of the Peoria Star from 1938 until 1949. He died in Peoria, Illinois, November 13, 1957. He was interred in Parkview Memorial Cemetery.

His son, Claude "Bud" Stone was a member of the Illinois Senate from 2001 to 2002.

U.S. House of Representatives
Preceded by Joseph V. Graff	Member of the U.S. House of Representatives from Illinois's 16th congressional district 1911-1917	Succeeded by Clifford C. Ireland
