= Pennie Von Bergen Wessels =

American politician

Member of the Illinois House of Representatives from the 73rd district
- In office January 1993 – January 1995
- Preceded by: David Deets
- Succeeded by: Jerry L. Mitchell

Personal details
- Born: Pennie Von Bergen; March 19, 1949 (age 77) Sterling, Illinois
- Party: Democratic
- Spouse: Michael Wessels
- Education: Northern Illinois University (B.S.); University of Illinois (J.D.)
- Profession: Teacher; Attorney

Pennie L. Von Bergen Wessels (born March 19, 1949) was a Democratic member of the Illinois House of Representatives for a single term from 1993 to 1995. She was raised in Sterling, Illinois. She attended Sauk Valley Community College and transferred to Northern Illinois University where she earned a Bachelor of Science in education. She later attended University of Illinois College of Law where she earned her juris doctor. She served as a member of the Whiteside County Board from 1984 until 1988 and as a director of the Citizen Utility Board. In 1988, she ran for the Illinois Senate, losing to Republican incumbent Calvin W. Schuneman.

She was elected to the Illinois House of Representatives in 1992 defeating appointed Republican incumbent David Deets. She was elected to represent the 73rd district, which included all or parts of Bureau, Henry, Lee, Ogle, and Whiteside. Her legislative priorities included education, health care, senior citizen interests, and agriculture with special emphasis on equitable education funding and health care reform.

She served on the following committees; aging; agriculture and conservation; appropriations-education; healthcare and human services; and public utilities. She was defeated for reelection in 1994 by Jerry L. Mitchell. She later lost a rematch with Mitchell in 1996, before being elected to the Sauk Valley Community College Board of Trustees in 1997. She has since retired and moved to Ocean Isle Beach, North Carolina.
