= William E. Hull =

American politician

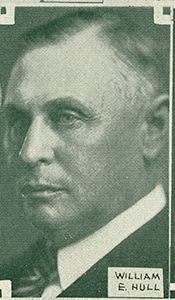

Member of the U.S. House of Representatives from Illinois's 16th district
- In office March 4, 1923 – March 3, 1933
- Preceded by: Clifford C. Ireland
- Succeeded by: Everett Dirksen

Personal details
- Born: January 13, 1866 Lewistown, Illinois, US
- Died: May 30, 1942 (aged 76) Toronto, Ontario, Canada
- Party: Republican

William Edgar Hull (January 13, 1866 – May 30, 1942) was an American businessman and politician. He served as U.S. Representative from Illinois for five terms.

Born in Lewistown, Illinois, Hull attended the common schools, Lewistown High School, and Illinois College at Jacksonville, Illinois. Before running for office, Hull was president of the Manito Chemical Co. and served as Postmaster of Peoria, Illinois from 1898 to 1906. He served as a member of the board of directors of the Illinois Highway Improvement Association.

Hull was a delegate to the Republican National Conventions in 1916 and 1920. Hull was elected as a Republican to the Sixty-eighth and to the four succeeding Congresses (March 4, 1923 – March 3, 1933). He was an unsuccessful candidate for renomination in 1932.

After politics, Hull resumed his former pursuits in Peoria, Illinois. He died in a hospital in Toronto, Ontario, Canada, May 30, 1942, while on a visit. Hull is interred in Oak Hill Cemetery, Lewistown, Illinois.

U.S. House of Representatives
| Preceded by Clifford C. Ireland | Member of the U.S. House of Representatives from Illinois's 16th congressional district 1923-1933 | Succeeded by Everett Dirksen |
