= Tim Lee Hall =

American politician (1925–2008)

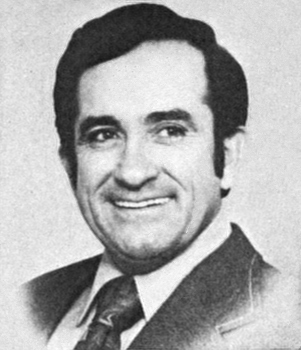

Member of the U.S. House of Representatives from Illinois's 15th district
- In office January 3, 1975 – January 3, 1977
- Preceded by: Leslie C. Arends
- Succeeded by: Tom Corcoran

Personal details
- Born: June 11, 1925 West Frankfort, Illinois, U.S.
- Died: November 12, 2008 (aged 83) LaGrange, Illinois, U.S.
- Party: Democratic
- Spouse: Marianne Heller
- Children: Two sons
- Education: Iowa Wesleyan College (B.A.); Southern Illinois University (M.S.); Valparaiso University (attended)
- Profession: Educator

Military service
- Allegiance: United States
- Branch/service: United States Coast Guard
- Years of service: 1943–1946
- Battles/wars: World War II

Tim Lee Hall (June 11, 1925 – November 12, 2008) was an American politician and Democratic member of the United States House of Representatives from Illinois for one term from 1975 to 1977.

== Early life and career ==
Born in West Frankfort, Illinois, Hall was educated in West Frankfort public schools. During World War II, he and his twin brother left high school in the middle of their junior year to enlist in the United States Coast Guard in 1943. Hall served in both the Atlantic theater and Pacific theater. After the war, he completed high school. He earned a bachelor of arts from Iowa Wesleyan College in 1951. He earned a Masters of Education Administration and Supervision from Southern Illinois University in Carbondale in 1956, and did graduate work at Valparaiso University in 1965. He became a social studies teacher and taught for a number of years at Dwight Junior High School. He also worked as an educational consultant with a major publishing company in Elgin, Illinois. At the time of his election, he was a training coordinator at William Fox Children's Center, a state facility for children with intellectual and developmental disabilities. In 1959, he met Marianne Heller, a fellow teacher. In 1970, they married and had two sons, Bret Tim and Jon Jason.

== Congressional tenure ==
In 1972, Hall ran for Congress, but lost. In 1974, Hall ran again for Congress, this time to succeed longtime congressman Leslie C. Arends, the House Republican Whip since 1943, in Illinois's 15th congressional district which included DeKalb, LaSalle, Kendall, Grundy, Livingston, Ford, Woodford, Marshall, Putnam counties and the southern portion of Kane County. Hall defeated Republican National Committeeman and former Congressman Cliffard D. Carlson of Aurora, Illinois.

Hall served in the 94th Congress. While in Congress, he served on the Committee on Education and Labor and the Science and Technology Committee. He was an unsuccessful candidate for reelection to the 95th Congress in 1976 when he was defeated by Republican Tom Corcoran.

== Post-congressional life ==
He was also an unsuccessful candidate for election in 1978 to the 96th Congress and in 1982 to the 98th Congress. In 1980, he ran for one of three seats in the Illinois House of Representatives from the 38th district. He finished fourth of four candidates losing to Republicans Thomas W. Ewing and Betty J. Hoxsey and Democrat Peg McDonnell Breslin.

He served as Administrative assistant to Illinois Secretary of State from 1977 to 1983. He ran for the Democratic nomination for the 1991 special election for Illinois's 15th congressional district, but lost to former State Representative Gerald A. Bradley.

He taught school in Illinois public school system and also served as a principal and superintendent at Goodfarm School until his retirement in the early 1990s. In 2008, Hall slipped outside of his son's house in Bolingbrook, Illinois and died later at La Grange Memorial Hospital in La Grange, Illinois.

U.S. House of Representatives
Preceded by Leslie C. Arends	U.S. Representative of Illinois' 15th congressional district 1975–1977	Succeeded by Tom Corcoran
