= Ed Madigan =

American politician (1936–1994)

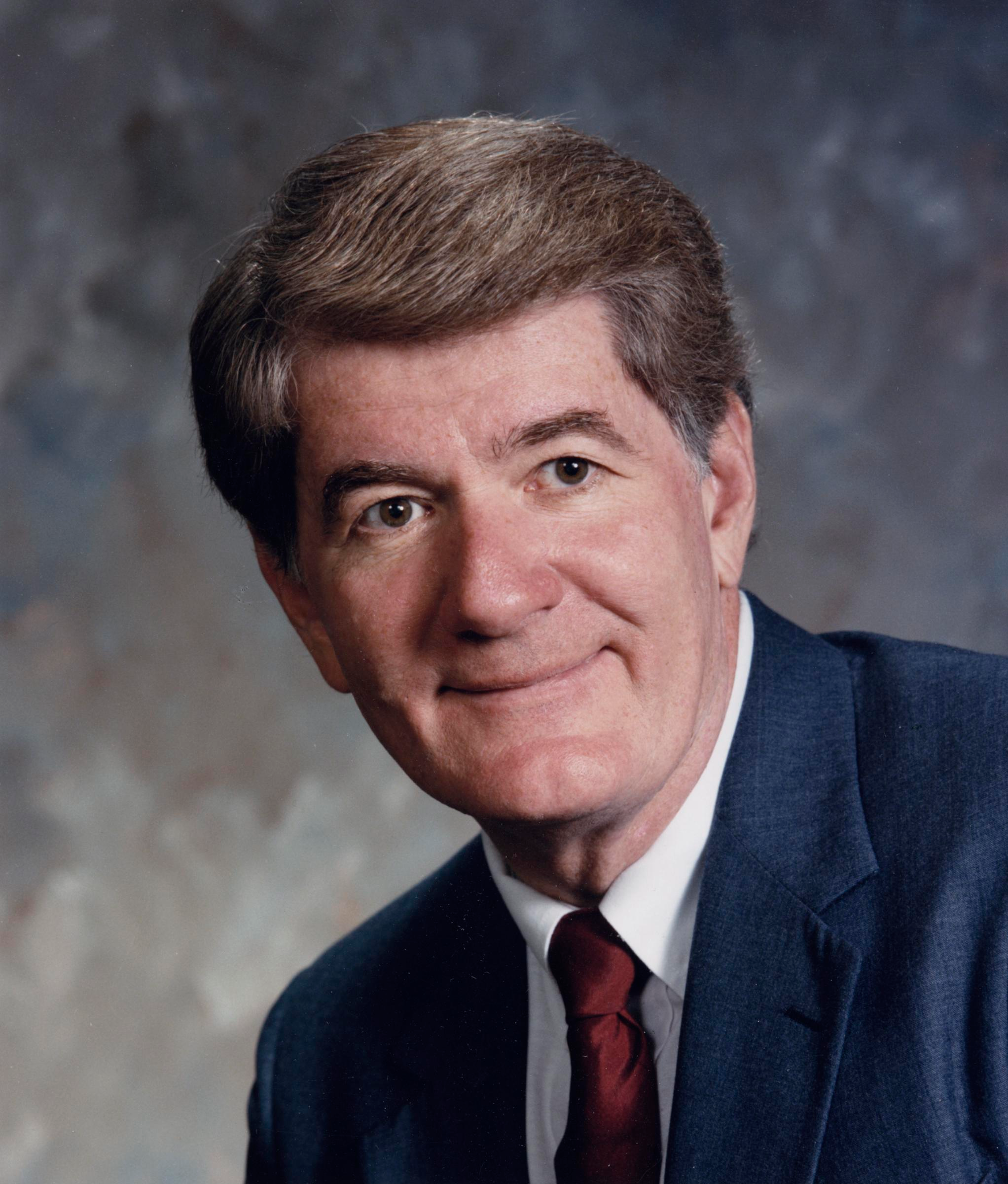

24th United States Secretary of Agriculture
- In office March 8, 1991 – January 20, 1993
- President: George H. W. Bush
- Preceded by: Clayton Yeutter
- Succeeded by: Mike Espy

House Republican Chief Deputy Whip
- In office January 3, 1987 – January 3, 1989
- Leader: Bob Michel
- Preceded by: Tom Loeffler
- Succeeded by: Steve Gunderson; Bob Walker

Chair of the House Republican Research Committee
- In office January 3, 1981 – January 3, 1983
- Leader: Bob Michel
- Preceded by: Trent Lott
- Succeeded by: James G. Martin

Member of the U.S. House of Representatives from Illinois
- In office January 3, 1973 – March 8, 1991
- Preceded by: William L. Springer (redistricted)
- Succeeded by: Thomas W. Ewing
- Constituency: 21st district (1973–1983); 15th district (1983–1991)

Member of the Illinois House of Representatives from the 47th district
- In office January 11, 1967 – January 3, 1973 Serving with Harber H. Hall, J.W. "Bill" Scott, Gerald A. Bradley
- Preceded by: At-large district abolished
- Succeeded by: Clarence E. Neff; A. T. McMaster; Samuel M. McGrew

Personal details
- Born: Edward Rell Madigan; January 13, 1936 Lincoln, Illinois, U.S.
- Died: December 7, 1994 (aged 58) Springfield, Illinois, U.S.
- Party: Republican
- Spouse: Evelyn George (m. 1955)
- Children: 3
- Education: Lincoln College, Illinois (attended)

Edward Rell Madigan (January 13, 1936 – December 7, 1994) was a businessman and a Republican Party politician from Lincoln, Illinois. He served almost 20 years in the United States House of Representatives and was U.S. Secretary of Agriculture under President George H. W. Bush.

== Early life, education, and politics ==
Madigan was born in Lincoln, Illinois, on January 13, 1936. He attended Lincoln Junior College before starting his own taxicab business.

== Politics ==
He entered public service as a member of the Lincoln Board of Zoning Appeals from 1965 to 1969. During that time, he was elected to the Illinois House of Representatives where he served from 1967 to 1973.

In November, 1972, he was elected as a Republican to the U.S. House of Representatives, and was subsequently elected to nine more terms. Madigan narrowly lost the race for minority whip in 1989 to future Speaker of the House Newt Gingrich of Georgia. Madigan served in Congress from 1973 to 1991, when Clayton Yeutter resigned, and Madigan was appointed secretary of agriculture. Serving from 1991 to 1993, Madigan was the first Roman Catholic to serve as secretary of agriculture.

== Death and legacy ==
He died of complications from lung cancer on December 7, 1994, at St. John's Hospital in Springfield, Illinois, at the age of 58. He and his wife, Evelyn, had three daughters.

On June 2, 1995, the former Plant and Animal Biotechnology Laboratory at the University of Illinois Urbana-Champaign was rededicated and renamed the Edward R. Madigan Laboratory in Madigan's honor.

In 1995, Edward R. Madigan State Fish and Wildlife Area, a state park near Lincoln, was renamed in Madigan's honor. Edward Madigan came from a politically active family. His younger brother Robert Madigan served as the City Clerk for Lincoln, Illinois for several terms, then sat in the Illinois State Senate for 14 years and finally concluded his public service with a brief term on the Illinois Commerce Commission.

In 1984, Illinois native, and future congressman from Nebraska Don Bacon interned in Madigan's Washington, D.C., office.

Illinois House of Representatives
| Preceded by At-large district abolished | Member of the Illinois House of Representatives from the 47th district 1967–1973; Served alongside: Harber H. Hall, J.W. "Bill" Scott, Gerald A. Bradley | Succeeded by Clarence E. Neff; A. T. McMaster; Samuel M. McGrew |
U.S. House of Representatives
| Preceded by Kenneth J. Gray | Member of the U.S. House of Representatives from Illinois's 21st congressional district 1973–1983 | Succeeded by Melvin Price |
| Preceded by Tom Corcoran | Member of the U.S. House of Representatives from Illinois's 15th congressional district 1983–1991 | Succeeded by Tom Ewing |
| Preceded by William C. Wampler | Ranking Member of the House Agriculture Committee; 1983–1991 | Succeeded by Tom Coleman |
Party political offices
| Preceded by Trent Lott | Chair of the House Republican Research Committee; 1981–1983 | Succeeded by James G. Martin |
| Preceded by Tom Loeffler | House Republican Chief Deputy Whip; 1987–1989 | Succeeded by Steve Gunderson; Bob Walker |
Political offices
| Preceded by Clayton Yeutter | United States Secretary of Agriculture; 1991–1993 | Succeeded by Mike Espy |
