= Edwin D. Eshleman =

American politician

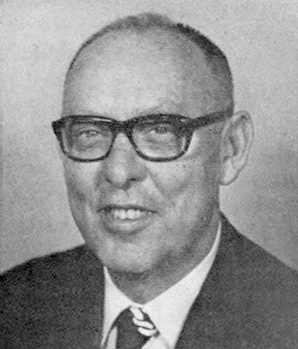

Member of the U.S. House of Representatives from Pennsylvania's 16th district
- In office January 3, 1967 – January 3, 1977
- Preceded by: John C. Kunkel
- Succeeded by: Robert Smith Walker

Member of the Pennsylvania House of Representatives
- In office 1954-1966

Personal details
- Born: Edwin Duing Eshleman; December 4, 1920 Quarryville, Pennsylvania, U.S.
- Died: January 10, 1985 (aged 64) Lancaster, Pennsylvania, U.S.
- Party: Republican
- Education: Franklin & Marshall College Coast Guard Academy

Edwin Duing Eshleman (December 4, 1920 – January 10, 1985) was an American politician who represented Pennsylvania in the United States House of Representatives as a Republican from 1967 to 1977.

== Biography ==
He was born in Quarryville, Pennsylvania, and attended Franklin and Marshall College, receiving a B.S. in 1942. He later studied at Temple University. During World War II, he served as a lieutenant in the United States Coast Guard. After the war, he taught school then was elected to the Pennsylvania House of Representatives, serving from 1954 to 1966. While serving in the state legislature Eshleman served at times as both Minority and Majority Whip. He was elected in 1966 to the 90th Congress, representing the 16th Congressional District in southcentral Pennsylvania. He was re-elected 4 times serving in the 91st, 92nd, 93rd, and 94th Congresses, from January 3, 1967, to January 3, 1977. Retiring for health reasons after 5 terms, he endorsed and was succeeded in Congress by his administrative assistant and chief of staff, Robert Smith Walker.

He lived in Lancaster, Pennsylvania, where he died.

U.S. House of Representatives
| Preceded by John C. Kunkel | Member of the U.S. House of Representatives from Pennsylvania's 16th congressional district 1967–1977 | Succeeded by Robert S. Walker |
