= David Deets =

American politician and doctor

David K. Deets is an American politician and doctor who served as a Republican member of the Illinois House of Representatives from March 1992 to January 1993.

== Illinois House of Representatives ==
In March 1992, he was appointed to succeed the late Myron Olson in the Illinois House of Representatives. He was on the board of directors for a medical arts clinic at the time of his appointment and the only practicing physician in the General Assembly. He ran for election in the 73rd district, a staunchly Republican district which included all or parts of Bureau, Henry, Lee, Ogle, and Whiteside. He lost by 378 votes to Democratic attorney and former Whiteside County Board member Pennie Von Bergen Wessels.

== Post-legislative career ==
In 2016, he was a member of the Lee County Tuberculosis Sanatorium Board.
