= Evan Corcoran =

American attorney (born 1964)

- Born: Matthew Evan Corcoran; July 28, 1964 (age 62)
- Education: Princeton University (BA); Georgetown University (JD)
- Relatives: Tom Corcoran (father)

Matthew Evan Corcoran (born July 28, 1964) is an American former federal prosecutor who became a white-collar crime defense attorney, gaining national prominence due to his role in the FBI investigation into Donald Trump's handling of government documents as Trump's attorney.

== Early life ==
Corcoran was born to Tom Corcoran, later a four-term U.S. Representative from Illinois, and, his wife, Helenmarie A. Corcoran. After graduating from a local high school, he attended Princeton University and graduated with a bachelor's degree in politics in 1986. He was a member of the first Princeton varsity rowing team to win the Intercollegiate Rowing Association championship. He received a Juris Doctor from Georgetown University Law Center in 1991.

== Career ==
In 1987 he became the assistant of a ranking member of a U.S. House of Representatives subcommittee. In 1992 he was appointed as an Assistant U.S. Attorney; he served for eight years until 2000. In that capacity he tried more than 30 jury trials, presented 20 appellate oral arguments, and investigated a number of criminal matters. In 2000 he joined the law firm of Wiley Rein LLP becoming a partner in 2003 Corcoran left Wiley Rein in 2015 and became managing director of the Fortress Investment Group in 2018 before joining the Baltimore law firm Silverman, Thompson, Slutkin & White in 2021.

During his time in private practice, Corcoran served as: trial counsel for an insurer in a $4 billion insurance coverage case that followed the destruction of the World Trade Center, a government contract litigation in which he represented Computer Sciences Corporation; a lead counsel for the audit committee of the largest pharmaceutical care company in the United States; a class action litigation in Hawaii in which he defended Verizon; and an antitrust counsel in a case where he represented T-Mobile in a civil lawsuit accompanying the US DOJ action to enjoin its merger with AT&T.

Corcoran had been a law school friend of Tim Shea, a top Trump-era Justice Department official whom then-Attorney General William Barr had appointed as the acting U.S. attorney in Washington, and in early 2020, Corcoran nearly became the second-ranking official in the federal prosecutor's office under Shea, but this came to naught when Shea was forced out of office amid outcry over the Justice Department leadership's interventions in the prosecutions of Roger Stone and former Trump national security advisor Michael Flynn.

Corcoran then defended Steve Bannon in his contempt of Congress case that ended in Bannon being found guilty of the charges brought against him. Corcoran also defended a Pennsylvania man who pleaded guilty to participating in the January 6 United States Capitol attack.

== Trump handling of government documents ==
May 10, 2022, letter, from Debra Steidel Wall, Acting Archivist of the United States, to M. Evan Corcoran, attorney for former president Donald J. Trump.

In April 2022 Corcoran joined the defense team of Donald Trump, according to a Washington Post report without Trump ever having met him before. According to the report he was introduced to the team via a conference call by another Trump advisor.

Prior to Corcoran's involvement, the National Archives (NARA) had informed Trump representatives in May 2021 that they were missing a number of documents and in December 2021 Trump's lawyers had informed the National Archives that they had found 12 boxes of documents at Mar-a-Lago, Trump's Florida residence. CNN reported that when the Archives first notified the Justice Department early in 2022 about the large volume of classified information retrieved from boxes returned from Mar-a-Lago, Justice officials balked at launching a criminal investigation.

On April 12, 2022, NARA said it would let the FBI access the documents retrieved from Mar-a-Lago. Trump's lawyers sought to delay this outcome. On May 10, 2022, Debra Steidel Wall, the acting Archivist of the United States, wrote Corcoran to reiterate that Trump had taken hundreds of pages of classified materials with him, including highly classified Special access programs materials, and that their extended negotiations over alleged executive privilege was delaying investigations and threat assessments already underway. She said that based on legal counsel she had decided not to honor their request for further delays. On May 11, 2022, the DOJ subpoenaed Trump for "any and all documents or writings in the custody or control of Donald J. Trump and/or the Office of Donald J. Trump bearing classification markings". Trump's attorneys urged him to fully comply with the subpoena.

On May 12, 2022, the DOJ issued a grand jury subpoena to the National Archives for the classified documents they had provided to the House select committee investigating the January 6 United States Capitol attack. In a letter to the DOJ dated May 25, 2022, Corcoran argued against proceeding with a criminal investigation, saying that presidents have the "absolute authority" to declassify documents. This letter was published by the DOJ alongside the affidavit of the search warrant for the August 8, 2022 search of President Trump's home in Mar-a-Lago.

In May 2022, Corcoran “warned the former president in person, at Mar-a-Lago, that not only did Trump have to fully comply with the subpoena, but that the FBI might search the estate if he didn't, according to Corcoran's audio notes following the conversation.”

Investigators from the DOJ and the FBI met with Trump's attorneys at Mar-a-Lago on June 3, 2022, about the classified material that was subpoenaed on May 11. During this meeting, Trump's custodian of records, Christina Bobb, turned over a collection of documents and gave the DOJ a signed certification, which stated that “a diligent search was conducted of the boxes that were moved from the White House to Florida” and that “any and all responsive documents accompany this certification.” The certification also included the caveat that the statements in it were true “based upon the information that has been provided.” The certification had been drafted by Corcoran for Bobb’s signature. In a memorandum of law explaining her ruling that later compelled Corcoran to testify before a grand jury, Chief Judge Beryl A. Howell of the U.S. District Court for the District of Columbia wrote that prosecutors had presented compelling evidence that Corcoran had been given only a “blinkered” view about where remaining boxes of documents were stored.

== Search of Mar-a-Lago ==
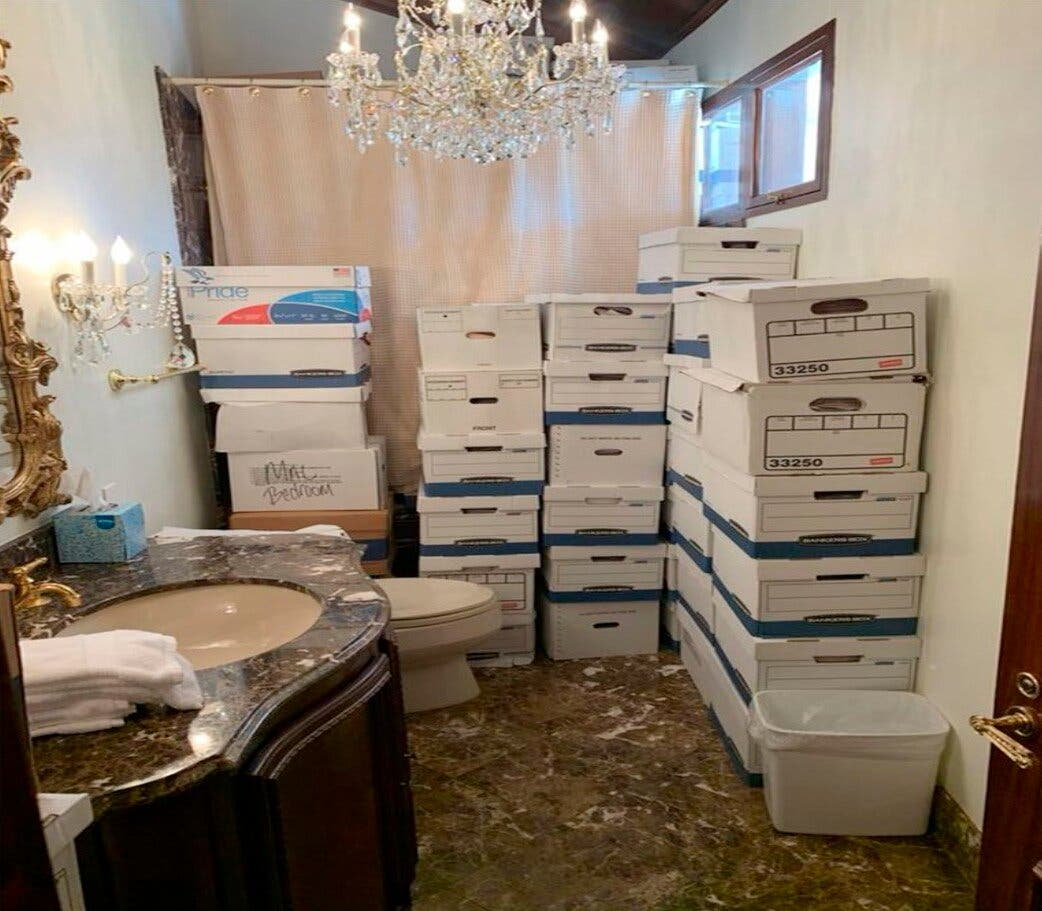
Document boxes in Mar-a-Lago bathroom

The Washington Post reported on “[m]onths of disputes” between DOJ prosecutors and FBI agents “as both sides wrestled with a national security case that ha[d] potentially far-reaching political consequences." According to a published “exclusive look at behind-the-scene deliberations”, FBI officials were concerned that the prosecutors were being overly aggressive and these officials opposed a surprise search of President Trump’s home at Mar-a-Lago, believing that they could negotiate with Corcoran to allow a consensual search for additional documents. Nonetheless, Attorney General Merrick Garland personally approved seeking a warrant to search Mar-a-Lago.

On August 8, 2022, the FBI executed a search warrant at Mar-a-Lago, seizing over 13,000 government documents and other items.

In 2022, Trump's Save America political action committee paid Corcoran's law firm $1.2 million in legal fees.

== Indictment and dismissal ==
In January 2023, Corcoran was subpoenaed and appeared before a grand jury and testified for about four hours, but he invoked attorney–client privilege to avoid answering certain questions about his conversations with President Trump. Special counsel Jack Smith in turn asked federal judge Beryl A. Howell in February to invoke the crime-fraud exception, arguing that Corcoran's communications with Trump were not protected by attorney-client privilege based on the crime-fraud exception. On March 17, 2023, Howell ruled that DOJ had justified the crime-fraud exception, and she ordered Corcoran to testify again. On March 22 the United States Court of Appeals for the District of Columbia Circuit rejected Trump's appeal by 3–0, forcing Corcoran to testify to the grand jury about his role in responding to the subpoena for documents and to turn over his contemporaneous notes. The Guardian reported two months later that Corcoran's roughly 50 pages of notes memorialized how he had warned Trump that he could not retain any subpoenaed classified documents, as well as the fact that Trump's valet Walt Nauta, himself under scrutiny in the criminal investigation, was closely involved in Corcoran's efforts to locate classified documents. The Guardian also reported that Corcoran's notes suggested the storage room, where he was searching, might have been left unattended when Corcoran took breaks. CNN subsequently confirmed some of the Guardian's reporting on Corcoran's notes.

In April 2023, on the eve of his testimony, Corcoran recused himself from the documents case while continuing to represent Trump in other cases. In May 2023, the Guardian reported that Corcoran had told associates he believed he had been misled when he searched Mar-a-Lago for classified documents in response to the subpoena. According to the report, Corcoran was said to have asked if there was anywhere other than the storage room he should look, including Trump's office, but that he was steered away. When the FBI returned months later with a search warrant, agents found classified documents located in Trump's office, among other places.

After the indictment of President Trump, Corcoran’s notes were at the center of a legal battle in the classified documents case, and Judge Aileen Cannon, the judge overseeing the case, heard arguments from the parties on whether “to limit prosecutors' use of the notes and to have the entire case dismissed based on the role of the notes in the government's case.”

On August 24, 2023, Corcoran accompanied President Trump to his arraignment in the U.S. District Court for the District of Columbia, on separate federal charges brought by special counsel Jack Smith relating to efforts to overturn the 2020 presidential election.

On September 19, 2023, President Trump designated Corcoran, along with attorney Todd Blanche, as his sole representatives under the Presidential Records Act in all respects that pertain to access to the records of his Presidency.

On July 15, 2024, Judge Cannon dismissed the classified documents case against President Trump on the grounds that “the appointment of special counsel Jack Smith violated the Constitution.”

On November 25, 2024, following President Trump’s election as the 47th U.S. President, Special Counsel Jack Smith dropped the classified documents case.
