= Gerald A. Bradley =

American businessman and politician

Gerald A. Bradley (October 15, 1927 – December 28, 2005) was an American businessman and politician.

Born in Chicago, Illinois, Bradley graduated from Thornton-Harvey High School. He served in the United States Army during the Korean War. Bradley graduated from Illinois Wesleyan University and was the owner of the Bloomington Tent and Awning Company in Bloomington, Illinois. He was also involved in the savings and loan business in Bloomington. From 1969 to 1983, Bradley served in the Illinois House of Representatives and was a Democrat.

In 1984, Bradley was the Democratic nominee for Illinois's 18th congressional district against House Minority Leader Robert H. Michel. Michel was reelected. In 1991, he made a second run for Congress in the special election to succeed Republican Congressman Edward Rell Madigan in Illinois's 15th congressional district. Bradley defeated former Congressman Tim Lee Hall in the Democratic primary, but lost the special election to Republican state legislator Thomas W. Ewing. In 2002, he was the Democratic nominee for the Illinois Senate, losing in the 44th district to Bill Brady.

Bradley died at St. Joseph Medical Center in Bloomington, Illinois.
