= Gordon Ropp =

American farmer and politician (1933–2020)

Gordon L. Ropp (April 5, 1933 – April 14, 2020) was an American farmer and politician.

Ropp was born in Normal, Illinois and graduated from Normal Community High School. He graduated from University of Illinois in 1955. Ropp served in the Illinois National Guard and was commissioned a captain. Ropp was a farmer and raised dairy cows. Ropp served as Illinois Director of Agriculture. Ropp, a Republican, served in the Illinois House of Representatives from 1979 to 1993. Ropp lost the 1992 Republican primary to Bill Brady.

Ropp died at his home in Normal, Illinois.
