= Roger Sommer (politician) =

American politician

Roger A. Sommer is an American politician who served as a Republican member of the Illinois Senate from 1973 to 1987.

== Biography ==
Sommer was born November 6, 1943, in Peoria, Illinois. He was raised in Tazewell County, Illinois. He graduated from Morton High School. He then attended Bradley University, receiving a Bachelor of Arts, and the University of Virginia School of Law, receiving a Bachelor of Laws. He was admitted to the Virginia State Bar and later to practice law in Illinois. Sommer went on to serve as an Assistant Attorney General with the Office of the Illinois Attorney General. Sommer is a veteran of the United States Army.

In 1972, Sommer was elected to the Illinois Senate representing the 45th district, which at that time, included all or portions of LaSalle, Putnam, Marshall, Woodford, and Tazewell counties in Central Illinois. After the Cutback Amendment, the 45th was redistricted to include Marshall, Woodford, and Tazewell, McLean, Logan, DeWitt, Menard, and Sangamon counties. Sommer chose not to run for reelection in 1986. He was succeeded by fellow Republican Robert Madigan, then the City Clerk of Lincoln, Illinois. His papers are stored at the Abraham Lincoln Presidential Library and Museum.

In 1993, he was appointed Chief Justice of the Illinois Claims Court for a term ending in 1995.

In 1999, his brother Keith, was elected to the Illinois House of Representatives.
