= Bill Brady (politician) =

American politician

- Brady in 2017

Minority Leader of the Illinois Senate
- In office July 1, 2017 – December 31, 2020
- Preceded by: Christine Radogno
- Succeeded by: Dan McConchie

Member of the Illinois Senate from the 44th district
- In office May 1, 2002 – December 31, 2020
- Preceded by: John Maitland
- Succeeded by: Sally Turner

Member of the Illinois House of Representatives from the 88th district
- In office January 1993 – January 2001
- Preceded by: Gordon Ropp
- Succeeded by: Dan Brady

Personal details
- Born: May 15, 1961 (age 65) Bloomington, Illinois, U.S.
- Party: Republican
- Spouse: Nancy Brady
- Children: 3
- Education: Illinois Wesleyan University (BA)

William E. Brady (born May 15, 1961) is an American politician who was a Republican member of the Illinois Senate from May 2002 until his resignation in December 2020.

Brady also served in the Illinois House of Representatives, representing the 88th District from 1993 to 2001 and was an unsuccessful candidate for Governor of Illinois in 2006, 2010, and 2014.

== Early life, education and career ==
Brady was born on May 15, 1961, in Bloomington, Illinois. He graduated from Central Catholic High School and Illinois Wesleyan University.

A millionaire real estate developer and broker, Brady is an owner of ReMax Choice and co-owner of Brady Homes, founded by his father, Bill Brady Sr.

== Illinois Legislature ==
In 1992, Bill Brady defeated seven term incumbent Gordon Ropp by a razor thin margin in the Republican primary to serve in the Illinois House of Representatives. He served in the Illinois House until giving up his seat to run for Congress. In 2001, incumbent Senator John Maitland announced he would not run for reelection. Brady defeated Rus Kinzinger, father of future Congressman Adam Kinzinger, in the 2002 Republican primary. On April 8, 2002, Maitland announced his intention to resign from the Illinois Senate effective April 30, 2002. The Legislative Committee of the Republican Party of the 44th Legislative District appointed Brady to the vacancy. Brady was sworn into office by Judge Rita Garman and took office on May 1, 2002.

After the 2020 general election, the Republican caucus chose Senator Dan McConchie to take over as Minority Leader. On December 31, 2020, Brady announced that he would resign his seat in the Senate effective at the end of the day. On January 25, 2021, Sally Turner was appointed to succeed Brady.

=== Committees ===
Brady served on the following committees:

- Agriculture and Conservation
- Committee of the Whole
- Conference Committee on SB1
- Environment
- Insurance
- State Government &Veterans Affairs
- Transportation

== Political campaigns ==
In 2000, Brady ran for the United States House of Representatives from Illinois's 15th congressional district after Republican incumbent Thomas W. Ewing announced his retirement. Brady lost the Republican primary to Tim Johnson. During the 2008 Republican Party presidential primaries, Brady served as the Illinois state chairman for the presidential campaign of former U.S. Senator Fred Thompson.

Brady ran for Governor of Illinois three times and was the Republican Nominee in 2010, but was ultimately unsuccessful in each run.

=== 2006 gubernatorial election ===
Brady ran for governor in 2006. He finished third in the Republican primary, getting about 18% of the vote.

=== 2010 gubernatorial election ===
In the 2010 gubernatorial election, he defeated his closest competitor, State Senator Kirk Dillard, by 193 votes in the GOP primary, and faced incumbent Democratic Governor Pat Quinn and Green Party candidate Rich Whitney in November. Brady's running mate was 28-year-old Jason Plummer, past Chairman of the Madison County Republican Party and, at the time, an intelligence officer in the U.S. Naval Reserve and vice president in his father's lumber business. Despite winning 98 of Illinois's 102 counties, Brady lost to Quinn by around 32,000 votes out of 3,700,000.

==== Results ====
Brady won 98 out of the 102 counties, winning all of the Chicago collar (suburban) counties. However, Quinn's huge win in Cook County which encompasses the Chicago Metropolitan Area, provided a large buffer of votes that Brady could not overcome. On election night, Quinn had an initial, large lead when results from Cook County were the first began to come in. Once suburban and rural precincts reported the vote tallies, Brady narrowed the gap, but Cook County provided enough votes to give the election to Governor Quinn. Brady conceded defeat on the following day, November 3. Quinn's win was ranked by Politico as the 7th biggest upset of the 2010 elections.

Illinois gubernatorial election, 2010
Party	Candidate	Votes	%	±%
Democratic	Pat Quinn/Sheila Simon (Incumbent)	1,745,219	46.79%	−3.00%
Republican	Bill Brady/Jason Plummer	1,713,385	45.94%	+6.68%
Independent	Scott Lee Cohen	135,705	3.64%	
Green	Rich Whitney	100,756	2.70%	−7.66%
Libertarian	Lex Green	34,681	0.93%	
Plurality		31,834	0.85%	-9.68%
Turnout		3,729,746		
Democratic hold		Swing		

=== 2014 gubernatorial election ===
Brady announced his third bid for Illinois Governor on June 26, 2013. His fellow GOP contenders were businessman Bruce Rauner, state treasurer Dan Rutherford, and Senator Kirk Dillard. Brady's running mate was Maria Rodriguez. She was initially courted by Bruce Rauner as a running mate. Rodriguez carried two terms as mayor of Long Grove, Illinois. Brady was the lowest-funded of the four Republican candidates for the primary election, with only $273,000 in his campaign account at the end of 2013. During his campaign, Brady made several swipes at competitor Bruce Rauner, including comparing Rauner to disgraced and jailed former Illinois Governor Rod Blagojevich. Among other things, Brady advocated for pension reform, reducing taxes, reforming worker's compensation, not increasing the minimum wage, and the dismantling of the Illinois State Board of Education. Brady lost the GOP primary at third place with 15% of the vote.

== Political positions ==
=== Death penalty ===
Brady intended to lift the moratorium on the death penalty if he became governor.

=== Abortion ===
Brady is anti-abortion. He supports a ban on all abortions, including in cases of rape and incest. He makes an exception and allows abortion when a mother's life is at risk. He has also backed legislation allowing pharmacists to refuse to dispense emergency contraceptions to a managed care system – the type currently administered by many Health Management Organizations (HMOs) – to control the cost of health care.

=== Gun control ===
Brady has stated that he is opposed to any further restrictions to the ownership of firearms in Illinois. He is also for legalizing concealed carry, which would allow qualified Illinois residents to receive a license to carry a handgun or other weapon in public in a concealed manner.

=== Term limits ===
Brady has called for term limits in Illinois. He would limit legislators to five terms in the House (10 years) and three terms (18 years) in the Senate.

=== Taxes ===
Brady has opposed efforts to raise state sales and income tax rates in Illinois. He favors reducing sales taxes that he claims drive retail jobs and businesses to other states. He favors dedicating a percentage of Illinois revenue to property tax relief and eliminating the estate tax in Illinois.

== Personal life ==
Bill and his wife, Nancy, have three children and own a home in Bloomington.

Party political offices
Preceded by Judy Topinka	Republican nominee for Governor of Illinois; 2010	Succeeded by Bruce Rauner
Illinois Senate
Preceded by Christine Radogno	Minority Leader of the Illinois Senate; 2017–2020	Succeeded by Dan McConchie
