= Todd Sieben =

American politician

Member of the Illinois Senate from the 45th district 37th district (1993-2003)
- In office January 1993 – February 2008
- Preceded by: Calvin W. Schuneman (37th)
- Succeeded by: Tim Bivins (45th)

Personal details
- Born: July 11, 1945 (age 81) Geneseo, Illinois, U.S.
- Party: Republican
- Spouse: Kay Sieben
- Education: Western Illinois University
- Profession: Business executive

Military service
- Allegiance: United States
- Branch/service: United States Navy
- Years of service: 1968–1972
- Rank: Lieutenant
- Battles/wars: Vietnam War

Todd Sieben (born July 11, 1945) was a Republican member of the Illinois Senate who represented northwestern Illinois from 1993 until his resignation in March 2008.

Sieben was born in Geneseo, Illinois on July 11, 1945. He attended Western Illinois University where he earned a bachelor's degree in business administration. From 1968 to 1972 he served as an officer in the United States Navy including serving in Vietnam. He ended his service with the United States Navy in 1972 with the rank of Lieutenant. He then became co-owner and vice-president of Sieben Hybrids, a family seed business and he operated a 400-acre livestock farm.

In 1986, he was elected to the Illinois House of Representatives to succeed A. T. McMaster. During his time in the House he praised lifting the inheritance tax, attempted to shorten campaigning season by moving back Illinois's March primary elections and was supportive of education reform with the exception of forced school district consolidation. In 1991, he advocated for Northern Illinois University to convert the Campbell Center in Mount Carroll, Illinois into a regional branch, similar to ones in Hoffman Estates and Naperville.

In 1992, he was elected to the Illinois Senate representing the 37th district, succeeding Calvin W. Schuneman.

After the 2001 redistricting, Sieben's district was renumbered to the 45th, and drawn to include all of Jo Daviess, Stephenson and Lee counties and portions of Winnebago, Ogle, Carroll, Whiteside and Henry counties. In 2003, he was appointed an Assistant Republican Leader.

He ran unopposed in 1998, 2002 and 2006. In 2007, he announced his retirement, but in February 2008 he chose to resign to become a lobbyist for the ethanol industry. He was succeeded by retired Lee County Sheriff Tim Bivins.
