= John Maitland (Illinois politician) =

American farmer and politician (born 1936)

Member of the Illinois Senate from the 44th district
- In office January 9, 1979 – April 30, 2002
- Preceded by: Harber Hall
- Succeeded by: Bill Brady

Personal details
- Born: July 29, 1936 (age 90) Normal, Illinois, U.S.
- Party: Republican
- Spouse: Joann
- Education: Illinois State University
- Profession: Farmer businessman

Military service
- Branch/service: (United States Marine Corps) Marine Corps

John W. Maitland, Jr. (born July 29, 1936) is an American farmer and politician who served as a Republican member of the Illinois Senate from 1979 until 2002.

== Early life ==
John W. Maitland, Jr. was born July 29, 1936, in Normal, Illinois. He graduated from Illinois State University and served in the United States Marine Corps. Maitland served on the McLean County Regional Planning Commission for a time.

== Illinois Senate ==
Incumbent Republican Harber Hall declined to run for reelection to the Illinois Senate in the 1978 election. Maitland, then-President of the McLean County Farm Bureau, defeated Mayor of Normal and Democratic candidate Carol Reitan for the open seat. Maitland was elected to the Illinois Senate on an "anti-big government" platform seeking to, among other things, reduce the high cost of the workmen's compensation and unemployment programs for Illinois businesses. In 1993, after the election of fellow Republican Pate Philip became the President of the Illinois Senate, Maitland joined twelve senators in reestablishing the Downstate Republican Caucus.

In September 2001, Maitland announced his intention to retire from the Illinois Senate. Bud Stone, an incumbent redistricted into the same district as Maitland also chose not to run. On April 8, 2002, Maitland announced his intention to resign from the Illinois Senate effective April 30, 2002. The Legislative Committee of the Republican Party of the 44th Legislative District appointed Bill Brady, the winner of the 2002 Republican primary for the newly drawn 44th district Senate seat, to the vacancy. Brady was sworn into office by Judge Rita Garman and took office on May 1, 2002.

== Post-political life ==
In 2017, Maitland and his wife Joann supported Illinois's effort to pass the Equal Rights Amendment. As of September 5, 2021, Maitland operates a museum of antique tractors on his family's farm.
