= Tim Bivins =

American politician (born 1952)

Member of the Illinois Senate from the 45th district
- In office March 7, 2008 – December 5, 2018
- Preceded by: Todd Sieben
- Succeeded by: Brian W. Stewart

Personal details
- Born: November 17, 1952 (age 73)
- Party: Republican
- Spouse: Terri Bivins
- Children: Two

Tim Bivins (born November 17, 1952) was a Republican member of the Illinois Senate representing the 45th district from 2008 to 2018.

Prior to his 2008 appointment to the Illinois Senate, Bivins served for two decades as the Lee County Sheriff.

== Early life, education and career ==
Bivins previously served as sheriff of Lee County, Illinois, which includes Dixon. He was elected sheriff in 1986 succeeding fellow Republican Raymond Edward Nehring as Sheriff. He served until 2006, retiring as Lee County's longest serving sheriff. He served on security details for President Ronald Reagan, Vice President George H. Bush, Vice President Dan Quayle, House Speaker J. Dennis Hastert, Governor Jim Edgar, Governor Jim Thompson, Governor George Ryan, and United States Senator Peter Fitzgerald. During his tenure as Sheriff, Tim served as President of the Illinois Sheriffs’ Association. Speaker Hastert named him to the Department of Justice Medal of Valor Review Board, an advisory group to President George Bush. Tim also served on the Illinois Juvenile Justice Commission, having been appointed by then-Governor Jim Edgar.

== Illinois Senate ==
On October 6, 2007, Republican incumbent Todd Sieben announced that he would not run for reelection in the 2008 general election. After Bivins filed to run in the Republican primary, Sieben resigned from the Illinois Senate effective March 6, 2008. The next day, local Republican leaders appointed Bivins to the vacancy created in the 45th Legislative District. Upon his swearing in, Minority Leader Frank Watson assigned Bivins to the following committees: Agriculture and Conservation, Licensed Activities, Commerce and Economic Development, State Government and Veterans Affairs. Bivins was named the Minority Spokesperson for the Committee on State Government and Veterans Affairs.

Four of five bills sponsored by Senator Bivins in his first legislative session – covering ethics, local schools, county jails and law enforcement – were passed by lawmakers. The 45th District Senator also finished the fiscal year with money to spare in his legislative account – which he returned to the state’s coffers. During the fall of 2008, he sponsored a number of public hearings in northwestern Illinois about the closing of state parks and historic sites by former Governor Rod Blagojevich.

Bivins served as an Illinois Co-Chair for the 2016 presidential campaign of Senator Ted Cruz.

On June 12, 2017, Bivins announced he would not seek another term. Brian Stewart was elected on November 6, 2018, to Bivins' seat representing the 45th district of the state of Illinois. Stewart took office on December 5, 2018.

== Personal life ==
Bivins and his wife, Terri, have two children.
