= Robert Madigan =

American politician

Robert A. "Bob" Madigan (November 28, 1942 – May 4, 2006) was an American politician.

Born in Lincoln, Illinois, Madigan received his bachelor's degree from Millikin University. His brother was Edward Rell Madigan. Madigan served as city clerk of Lincoln, Illinois. From 1987 to 2001, Madigan served in the Illinois State Senate as a Republican. He was then appointed to the Illinois Industrial Commission. He died in Lincoln, Illinois.

== Notes ==
Illinois Senate
Preceded by Roger Sommer	Member of the Illinois Senate from the 45th district 1987–2003	Succeeded by Todd Sieben
