= Tom Corcoran (politician) =

American former politician

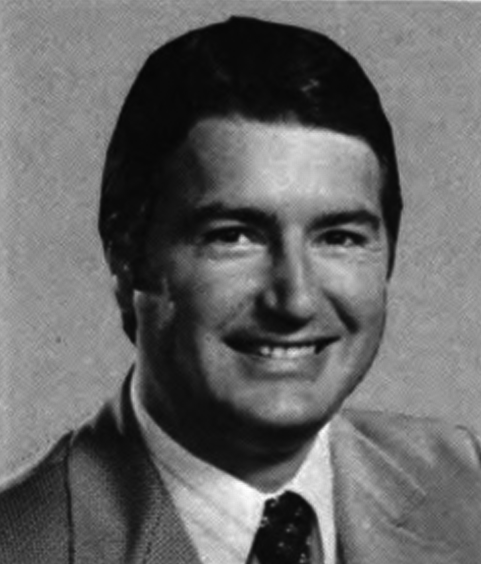

Member of the U.S. House of Representatives from Illinois
- In office January 3, 1977 – November 28, 1984
- Preceded by: Tim Lee Hall
- Succeeded by: John E. Grotberg
- Constituency: 15th district (1977–1983); 14th district (1983–1984)

Personal details
- Born: Thomas Joseph Corcoran; May 23, 1939 (age 87) Ottawa, Illinois, U.S.
- Party: Republican
- Spouse: Helenmarie Corcoran
- Children: Evan
- Education: University of Notre Dame (BA); University of Illinois, Urbana-Champaign; University of Chicago; Northwestern University

Thomas Joseph Corcoran (born May 23, 1939) is an American businessman, military veteran and former politician. He served four terms in Congress as a U.S. representative from Illinois from 1977 to 1984. He served in politics as a member of the Republican Party.

== Biography ==
Corcoran was born in Ottawa, Illinois. He graduated from Marquette High School in Ottawa in 1957. He received a B.A. from the University of Notre Dame in 1961 and did graduate work at University of Illinois, the University of Chicago, and Northwestern University.

=== Military service ===
He served in the United States Army as an artillery officer from 1963 to 1965 and was stationed in Germany.

=== Early political career ===
He then went into politics, serving in staff positions for the State of Illinois Office in Washington, D.C. from 1969 to 1972 and for William Harris while Harris was President of the Illinois Senate.

=== Congress ===
After serving as vice president of the Chicago-North Western Transportation Co. from 1974 to 1976, he was elected to Congress in 1976 and was re-elected three times.

=== Senate campaign ===
In the 1984 United States Senate election, Corcoran opted to challenge incumbent Senator Charles Percy in the Republican primary as a conservative alternative to Percy's record as a moderate Republican. Percy defeated Corcoran in the primary election before losing to Democratic candidate Paul Simon in the general election. Corcoran was succeeded in Congress by State Senator John Grotberg.

In 1985, Cocoran announced his intention to run for the United States Senate against Democratic incumbent Alan J. Dixon in the 1986 Senate election. However, after losing several political allies to Inland Steel Company executive George Ranney he dropped out of the primary election. State Representative Judy Koehler defeated Ranney in the Republican primary.

=== After politics ===
He was appointed to the Board of Directors of United States Synthetic Fuels Corporation in 1984 by President Ronald Reagan. His term was supposed to run through 1990, but the corporation was abolished in 1985.

== Family ==
Evan Corcoran, known for being an attorney of Donald Trump, is Tom Corcoran's son.

U.S. House of Representatives
Preceded by Tim Lee Hall	Member of the U.S. House of Representatives from Illinois's 15th congressional district 1977–1983	Succeeded by Ed Madigan
Preceded by John N. Erlenborn	Member of the U.S. House of Representatives from Illinois's 14th congressional district 1983–1984	Succeeded by John E. Grotberg
U.S. order of precedence (ceremonial)
Preceded by Greg Pence as Former U.S. Representative	Order of precedence of the United States as Former U.S. Representative	Succeeded by Rahm Emanuel as Former U.S. Representative
