= Illinois Workers' Compensation Commission =

State agency in Illinois, United States

Workers Compensation Commission
Commission overview
- Jurisdiction: Illinois

The Illinois Workers Compensation Commission is the quasi-autonomous commission of the Illinois state government that hears cases involving workers compensation. Sitting as a panel of administrative law, the Commission resolves disputes between injured workers and their employers regarding workplace incidents. The Commission generates case law that is valid in Illinois. This decisions, and the case law derived from them, serve as initial points of reference for questions of employer liability, disability diagnoses and treatments, and the extent to which medical expenses can be charged to an employer and an employer's workers' compensation insurer.
