= Harber H. Hall =

American politician (1920–2020)

Harber Hall

Member of the Illinois Senate from the 44th district
- In office 1973–1979
- Succeeded by: John Maitland

Member of the Illinois House of Representatives from the 47th district
- In office 1967–1972
- Preceded by: New district

Personal details
- Born: September 24, 1920 Chicago, Illinois, United States
- Died: February 22, 2020 (aged 99) Lakewood Ranch, Florida, United States
- Party: Republican
- Education: University of Miami
- Occupation: real estate broker
- Military career
- Allegiance: United States
- Branch: (United States Army) Army Air Forces (United States Air Force) Air Force
- Years: 1942 — 1947 (Army); 1947 — 1956 (Air Force)
- Rank: Major
- Wars: World War II; Korean War

Harber Homer Hall (September 24, 1920 – February 22, 2020) was an American politician in the state of Illinois.

== Early life and career ==
Hall was born September 24, 1920, in Chicago, Illinois. He attended public schools in Bloomington, Illinois, and later the University of Miami. During World War II, Hall enlisted in the United States Army Air Corps. Discharged with the rank of Major from the Air Force in 1956, Hall saw service in World War II, the Berlin Airlift, and the Korean War. After his active duty service, he held the rank of Lieutenant colonel in the Air Force Reserves until no earlier than 1967. In 1962, Hall became the County Treasurer of McLean County. While County Treasurer, he served as Legislative Chairman of Illinois County Treasurers' Association 1962 to 1965 and the group's President from 1966 to 1967.

== Illinois General Assembly ==
In 1965, the Illinois Supreme Court resolved a longstanding reapportionment dispute and drew new districts for the Illinois General Assembly. In 1966, Hall was elected to the Illinois House of Representatives as one of three representatives from the 47th district. The 47th included Woodford, McLean, Logan, DeWitt, and Piatt counties in Central Illinois. In 1972, Hall was elected to the Illinois State Senate from the 44th district. He served until retiring in 1979. In the 1978 election. John Maitland, the President of the McLean County Farm Bureau, defeated Mayor of Normal and Democratic candidate Carol Reitan for the open seat.

== Later life ==
He died on February 22, 2020, in Lakewood Ranch, Florida, at the age of 99.
