= A. T. McMaster =

American politician and farmer

A. T. "Tom" McMaster (June 21, 1918 – September 3, 2002) was an American politician and farmer.

Born in Oneida, Illinois, McMaster went to Knox College and was a farmer. He served on the Knox County, Illinois Board of Commissioners. McMaster served in the Illinois House of Representatives from 1971 to 1987 as a Republican.
