= Tom Ewing =

American politician (born 1935)

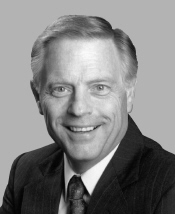
- official portrait, circa 1999

Member of the U.S. House of Representatives from Illinois's 15th district
- In office July 2, 1991 – January 3, 2001 (Note: Ewing's official service begins on the date of the special election, while he was not sworn in until July 10, 1991.)
- Preceded by: Ed Madigan
- Succeeded by: Tim Johnson

Member of the Illinois House of Representatives
- In office January 1975 – January 1991
- Preceded by: Multi-member district
- Succeeded by: E. Leslie Conkling
- Constituency: 38th district (1975–1983); 87th district (1983–1991)

Personal details
- Born: Thomas William Ewing; September 19, 1935 (age 90) Atlanta, Illinois, U.S.
- Party: Republican
- Education: Millikin University (BS); John Marshall Law School (JD)

Thomas William Ewing (born September 19, 1935 in Atlanta, Illinois) is a former Republican member of the United States House of Representatives and the Illinois State House of Representatives. Ewing was a state representative from 1974 to 1991, and a U.S. Congressman representing the 15th district of Illinois from July 2, 1991 until his retirement on January 3, 2001. In January 1995 he was named a Deputy Republican House Whip. While a U.S. Congressman, Thomas Ewing was considered to be a Conservative, favoring a smaller, less intrusive government, but more on economic issues than on social ones.

== Early life, education, and career ==
Ewing has a B.S. from Millikin University, Decatur, Illinois, where he was a member of the Illinois Delta chapter of Sigma Alpha Epsilon, and a J.D. from John Marshall Law School in Chicago.

Ewing served in the United States Army Reserve from 1957 to 1963.

Ewing practiced law privately from 1968 until 1991, and Ewing was the Livingston County, Illinois Assistant State's Attorney from 1968 until 1973.

== Illinois House of Representatives (1974–1991) ==
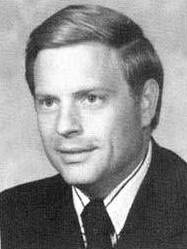
official portrait, circa 1976

Ewing served in the Illinois House of Representatives from 1974 to 1991.

During his tenure in the state house, he served as a member of the Agriculture Committee and as chairman of the House Revenue Committee. He was considered an expert on revenue and fiscal matters.

== U.S. House of Representatives (1991–2001) ==
In 1991, Ewing was elected to represent the 15th district of Illinois in the United States House of Representatives after winning a special election to fill the seat left vacant by the resignation of Ed Madigan. Ewing held the seat from July 2, 1991 until his retirement on January 3, 2001. Ewing was regarded to be a conservative member of the House, but was more so a fiscal conservative than a social conservative (overall, favoring a smaller and less intrusive government)

Ewing served on the House Committee on Agriculture, Transportation and Infrastructure, Science, and House Administration. He chaired the Agriculture Subcommittee on Risk Management and Specialty Crops. A leader in the Congressional Rural Caucus, Ewing used his Agriculture Subcommittee chairmanship to call attention to the concerns of the nation's farmers. He also served on the Central Committee of the Illinois Republican Party.

Ewing played an active role in shaping the Republican Revolution that brought his party to the majority in the House of Representatives for the first time in more than 40 years. He was a strong backer of the "Contract with America". In January 1995 Ewing was named a deputy Republican House Whip. Newt Gingrich also selected Ewing to be his successor as chairman of the Conservative Opportunity Society (Gingrich resigned the chairmanship after being elected House speaker). In the new congress, Ewing championed efforts to achieve a balanced budget.

In December 1998 Ewing voted in favor of all articles of impeachment proposed against President Bill Clinton.

In late-1998, Ewing was instrumental in rallying the support needed to make Dennis Hastert the new leader of the House Republican Conference, positioning Hastert to be elected speaker in January 1999.

In December 2000 Ewing introduced the Commodity Futures Modernization Act of 2000.

== Post-congress ==
From 2001 to 2007, Ewing served as the chairman of the Biomass Research and Development Technical Advisory Committee, a joint effort of the Department of Agriculture and Department of Energy to encourage renewable fuel development and production. The position was a non-paying appointment. He is a former director of the Energy Future Coalition and the Future Commodity Trading Commission, a regulatory body over America's future exchanges. He is also a former director of the Institute for Representative Government, a federally-funded bipartisan effort to advance democratic principles among the leaders of developing nations.

He served 12 years as Chairman of Monsanto's National Grower Advisory Council, a distinguished group made up of the elected chairmen and CEOs of the most major agricultural commodities and connected trade promotion groups in America.

He has received honorary Doctor of Law degrees from Lincoln College, The John Marshall Law School, and Millikin University. In 2002 he was honored by being selected by the Millikin Board of Trustees as a recipient of the Millikin Medallion Society award, the Illinois Farm Bureau Charles B. Shuman Distinguished Service Award, and inducted into the Hall of Fame of the 67th Sigma Alpha Epsilon Leadership School.

In 2005 and 2006 he completed two task force assignments: first, with the Chicago Council on Foreign Relations to examine the future of U.S. agriculture policy, and second, as co-chairman of the Aspen Institute's three-day symposium on achieving the security, environmental, and economic potential of bioenergy.

He is a former director of the Energy Future Coalition and the Future Commodity Trading Commission, a regulatory body over America's future exchanges. He is also a former director of the Institute for Representative Government, a federally-funded bipartisan effort to advance democratic principles among the leaders of developing nations. He is a retired director of the Pontiac National Bank Holding Company.

He is working on several major initiatives to advance the development of alternate and renewable energy sources that would benefit our national economy, contribute to national defense, and reduce our need for imported oil, and was a member of the Steering Committee of the Ag Energy Working Group 25x25. He also serves as a member of the Advisory Board of the International Conservation Caucus Foundation, is active with Fix the Debt, a campaign of the Committee for a Responsible Federal Budget, and serves as Senior Policy Advisor to the Washington law firm Davis & Harman LLP.

== Private life ==
Congressman Ewing and his wife Connie are the parents of six adult children.

U.S. House of Representatives
Preceded by Ed Madigan	Member of the U.S. House of Representatives from Illinois's 15th congressional district 1991–2001	Succeeded by Tim Johnson
Party political offices
Preceded by Bob Walker	Chair of the Conservative Opportunity Society; 1995–1997	Position abolished
U.S. order of precedence (ceremonial)
Preceded by Glenn Poshard as Former U.S. Representative	Order of precedence of the United States as Former U.S. Representative	Succeeded by Cheri Bustos as Former U.S. Representative
