= Calvin W. Schuneman =

American politician (born 1926)

Calvin Wayne Schuneman (born May 7, 1926) is an American politician.

== Life and career ==
Born in Manlius, Illinois, Schuneman went to Bradley University. He owned an insurance business. Schuneman served in the Illinois House of Representatives as a Republican from 1975 to 1981 and then in the Illinois State Senate from 1981 to 1993. Schuneman lived in Prophetstown, Illinois, but later moved to Fort Myers, Florida. He celebrated his 80th wedding anniversary in May 2024.
